= List of Trisetum species =

A list of species in genus Trisetum. There are approximately 75 species in this genus of grasses.

- Trisetum aeneum
- Trisetum agrostideum
- Trisetum agrostoides
- Trisetum airaeforme
- Trisetum airoides
- Trisetum alaskanum
- Trisetum albanicum
- Trisetum albidum
- Trisetum alopecuros
- Trisetum alpestre
- Trisetum alpinum
- Trisetum altaicum
- Trisetum altijugum
- Trisetum altum
- Trisetum ambiguum
- Trisetum americanum
- Trisetum andicola
- Trisetum andinum
- Trisetum andropogonoides
- Trisetum angustum
- Trisetum anomalum
- Trisetum antarcticum
- Trisetum antoniijosephii
- Trisetum araeanthum
- Trisetum arduanum
- Trisetum arenarium
- Trisetum argenteum
- Trisetum argentoideum
- Trisetum aristidoides
- Trisetum aureum
- Trisetum balearicum
- Trisetum bambusiforme
- Trisetum barbatipaleum
- Trisetum barbatum
- Trisetum barbinode
- Trisetum barcinonense
- Trisetum baregense
- Trisetum berteroanum
- Trisetum berteronianum
- Trisetum bertolonii
- Trisetum biaristatum
- Trisetum bifidum
- Trisetum biflorum
- Trisetum bongardii
- Trisetum bornmuelleri
- Trisetum brachyatherum
- Trisetum brandegei
- Trisetum brasiliense
- Trisetum brevifolium
- Trisetum brittonii
- Trisetum buchtienii
- Trisetum bulbosum
- Trisetum bungei
- Trisetum burnoufii
- Trisetum buschianum
- Trisetum californicum
- Trisetum canariense
- Trisetum canescens
- Trisetum carsicum
- Trisetum caudulatum
- Trisetum cavanillesianum
- Trisetum cavanillesii
- Trisetum cernuum
- Trisetum cheesemani
- Trisetum chiloense
- Trisetum chloranthum
- Trisetum chromostachyum
- Trisetum ciliare
- Trisetum clarkei
- Trisetum compressum
- Trisetum condensatum
- Trisetum confertum
- Trisetum congdoni
- Trisetum congdonii
- Trisetum conradiae
- Trisetum cristatum
- Trisetum cumingii
- Trisetum curvisetum
- Trisetum debile
- Trisetum depauperatum
- Trisetum deyeuxioides
- Trisetum dianthemum
- Trisetum disjunctum
- Trisetum distichophyllum
- Trisetum dozei
- Trisetum dregeanum
- Trisetum drucei
- Trisetum dufourei
- Trisetum durangense
- Trisetum elatum
- Trisetum elongatum
- Trisetum erectum
- Trisetum evolutum
- Trisetum faurei
- Trisetum fedtschenkoi
- Trisetum filifolium
- Trisetum flaccidum
- Trisetum flavescens
- Trisetum foliosum
- Trisetum formosanum
- Trisetum forskelii
- Trisetum fournieranum
- Trisetum fraudulentum
- Trisetum friesianum
- Trisetum frondosum
- Trisetum fuegianum
- Trisetum fuscescens
- Trisetum gallecicum
- Trisetum gaudinianum
- Trisetum glabratum
- Trisetum glabrum
- Trisetum glaciale
- Trisetum glomeratum
- Trisetum glumaceum
- Trisetum gmelini
- Trisetum gracile
- Trisetum griseovirens
- Trisetum groenlandicum
- Trisetum hallii
- Trisetum handelii
- Trisetum henryi
- Trisetum heteronymum
- Trisetum hirsutum
- Trisetum hirtiflorum
- Trisetum hirtulum
- Trisetum hirtum
- Trisetum hispanicum
- Trisetum hispidum
- Trisetum hohenackeri
- Trisetum homochlamys
- Trisetum howellii
- Trisetum humile
- Trisetum imberbe
- Trisetum inaequale
- Trisetum insulare
- Trisetum interruptum
- Trisetum irazuense
- Trisetum juergensii
- Trisetum kitadakense
- Trisetum kochianum
- Trisetum koelerioides
- Trisetum koidzumianum
- Trisetum kurtzii
- Trisetum labradoricum
- Trisetum lachnanthum
- Trisetum laconicum
- Trisetum lasianthum
- Trisetum lasiolepis
- Trisetum lasiorhachis
- Trisetum latifolium
- Trisetum lautum
- Trisetum laxiflorum
- Trisetum laxum
- Trisetum lechleri
- Trisetum leoninum
- Trisetum lepidum
- Trisetum leve
- Trisetum ligulatum
- Trisetum lineare
- Trisetum litorale
- Trisetum litvinovii
- Trisetum litvinowii
- Trisetum lobatum
- Trisetum loeffingii
- Trisetum loeflingianum
- Trisetum longiaristum
- Trisetum longifolium
- Trisetum longiglume
- Trisetum ludovicianum
- Trisetum lusitanicum
- Trisetum luteum
- Trisetum luzonense
- Trisetum macbridei
- Trisetum macilentum
- Trisetum macranthum
- Trisetum macratherum
- Trisetum macrochaetum
- Trisetum macrotrichum
- Trisetum macrum
- Trisetum maidenii
- Trisetum majus
- Trisetum malacanthum
- Trisetum malacophyllum
- Trisetum martha-gonzaleziae
- Trisetum mattheii
- Trisetum melicoides
- Trisetum melitense
- Trisetum mexicanum
- Trisetum micans
- Trisetum michellii
- Trisetum micranthum
- Trisetum micratherum
- Trisetum miegevillii
- Trisetum minutiflorum
- Trisetum molle
- Trisetum mollifolium
- Trisetum mongolicum
- Trisetum montanum
- Trisetum monticola
- Trisetum morisii
- Trisetum muricatum
- Trisetum muticum
- Trisetum myrianthum
- Trisetum nancaguense
- Trisetum nanum
- Trisetum neesii
- Trisetum neglectum
- Trisetum nemorosum
- Trisetum nitidum
- Trisetum nivosum
- Trisetum noeanum
- Trisetum nudum
- Trisetum nutkaense
- Trisetum obtusiflorum
- Trisetum ochrostachyum
- Trisetum oreophilum
- Trisetum orthochaetum
- Trisetum ovatipaniculatum
- Trisetum ovatum
- Trisetum pallidum
- Trisetum palmeri
- Trisetum palustre
- Trisetum palustris
- Trisetum paniceum
- Trisetum paniculatum
- Trisetum pappophoroides
- Trisetum paradoxum
- Trisetum parviflorum
- Trisetum parvispiculatum
- Trisetum pauciflorum
- Trisetum paui
- Trisetum pennsylvanicum
- Trisetum pensylvanicum
- Trisetum persicum
- Trisetum phleoides
- Trisetum pilosum
- Trisetum pinetorum
- Trisetum pourreti
- Trisetum praecox
- Trisetum pratense
- Trisetum preslei
- Trisetum pringlei
- Trisetum projectum
- Trisetum puberulum
- Trisetum pubescens
- Trisetum pubiflorum
- Trisetum pumilum
- Trisetum pungens
- Trisetum purpurascens
- Trisetum pyramidatum
- Trisetum rechingeri
- Trisetum rigidum
- Trisetum rohlfsii
- Trisetum rosei
- Trisetum rufescens
- Trisetum ruprechtii
- Trisetum sandbergii
- Trisetum saxeticola
- Trisetum scabriflorum
- Trisetum scabriusculum
- Trisetum scabrivalve
- Trisetum scitulum
- Trisetum sclerophyllum
- Trisetum seravschanicum
- Trisetum sericeum
- Trisetum serpentinum
- Trisetum sesquiflorum
- Trisetum sesquiterium
- Trisetum sesquitertium
- Trisetum shearii
- Trisetum sibiricum
- Trisetum sikkimense
- Trisetum smyrnaeum
- Trisetum spellenbergii
- Trisetum spicatum
- Trisetum spiciforme
- Trisetum splendens
- Trisetum splendidulum
- Trisetum steudelii
- Trisetum striatum
- Trisetum subaristatum
- Trisetum subspicatum
- Trisetum subspontaneum
- Trisetum taquetii
- Trisetum tarnowskii
- Trisetum teberdense
- Trisetum tenellum
- Trisetum tenue
- Trisetum tenuiforme
- Trisetum thospiticum
- Trisetum thunbergii
- Trisetum tibeticum
- Trisetum toluccense
- Trisetum tomentosum
- Trisetum tonduzii
- Trisetum transcaucasicum
- Trisetum transsilvanicum
- Trisetum transylvanicum
- Trisetum triflorum
- Trisetum trinii
- Trisetum trisetaria
- Trisetum turcicum
- Trisetum umbratile
- Trisetum umbrosum
- Trisetum uniflorum
- Trisetum vaccarianum
- Trisetum valesiaca
- Trisetum valesiacum
- Trisetum variabile
- Trisetum varium
- Trisetum velutinum
- Trisetum viciosorum
- Trisetum vidali
- Trisetum villosum
- Trisetum virescens
- Trisetum viride
- Trisetum virletii
- Trisetum wilhelmsii
- Trisetum wiliamsii
- Trisetum williamsii
- Trisetum wolfii
- Trisetum wrangelense
- Trisetum youngii
- Trisetum yunnanense
