= P. californicus =

P. californicus may refer to:

- Paralichthys californicus, the California halibut or California flounder, a large-tooth flounder species native to the waters of the Pacific Coast of North America
- Parastichopus californicus, a synonym of the California sea cucumber (Apostichopus californicus), a sea cucumber species found from the Gulf of Alaska to Southern California
- Penstemon californicus, the California penstemon, a plant species native to Baja California
- Peromyscus californicus, the California mouse, a rodent species found in north-western Mexico and central to southern California
- Phidippus californicus, a jumping spider species found in the southwestern United States
- Platystemon californicus, the creamcup, a plant species native to Oregon, California, Arizona, Utah and Baja California
- Pleuropogon californicus, the annual semaphoregrass, a grass species endemic to northern California
- Poebrodon californicus, an extinct terrestrial herbivore species endemic to North America from the Pliocene through Pleistocene
- Poecilanthrax californicus, a fly species in the genus Poecilanthrax
- Pogonomyrmex californicus, an ant species in the genus Pogonomyrmex

== See also ==
- List of Latin and Greek words commonly used in systematic names#C
