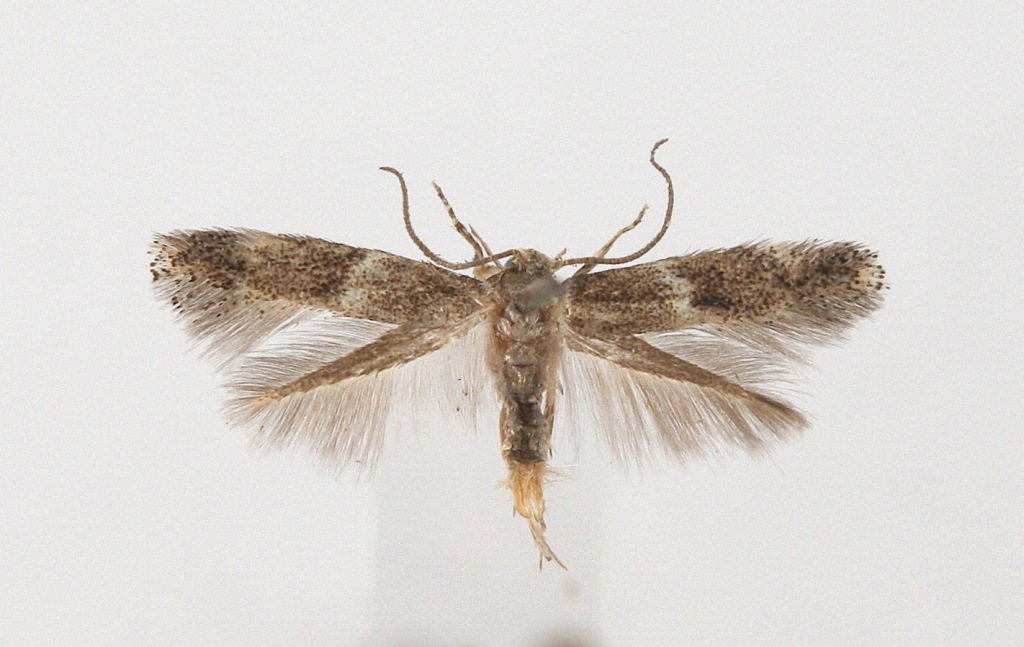

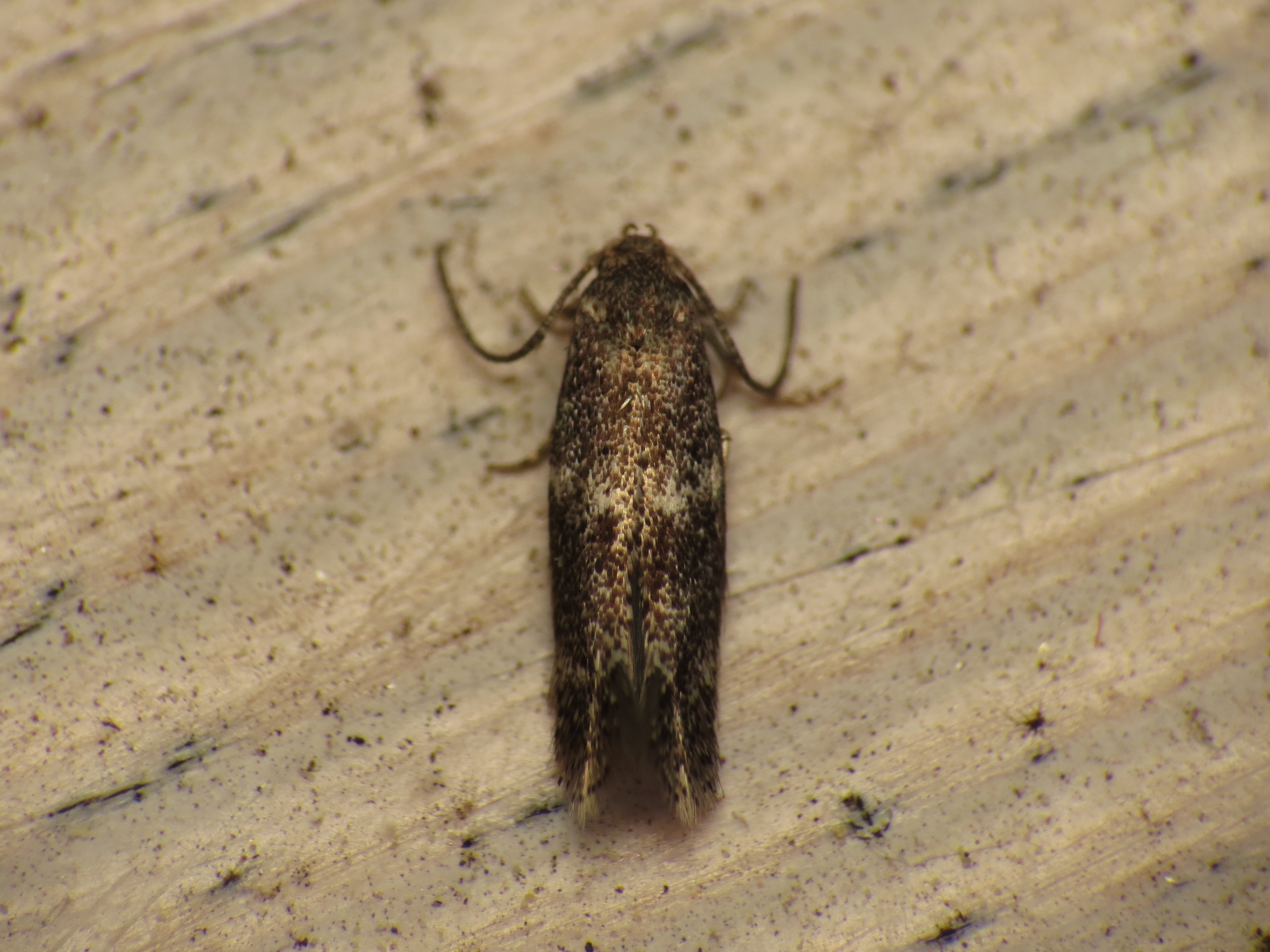

Scientific classification
- Domain: Eukaryota
- Kingdom: Animalia
- Phylum: Arthropoda
- Class: Insecta
- Order: Lepidoptera
- Family: Elachistidae
- Genus: Elachista
- Species: E. freyerella

Binomial name
- Elachista freyerella (Hübner, [1825])

Synonyms
- List: Antispila freyerella Hübner, [1825]; Cosmiotes freyerella (Hübner, [1825]); Tinea nigrella Hübner, [1805] nec Fabricius, 1775; Elachista tristictella Nylander, [1848] 1847; Elachista bistictella Tengström, [1848] 1847; Elachista aridella Heinemann, 1854; Elachista gregsoni Stainton, 1855; Elachista incertella Frey, 1859; Poeciloptilia grisescens Wocke, 1862; Elachista gregsonella Morris, 1870; Elachista sublimis Frey, 1866; Cosmiotes nigrella auct., nec Herrich-Schäffer, 1855; Cosmiotes scopulicola Braun, 1948; Elachista arundinella Zeller, 1850

= Elachista freyerella =

Species of moth

Elachista freyerella is a moth of the family Elachistidae that is found in all of Europe, except the Balkan Peninsula. It is also found in North America.

== Description ==
The wingspan is 7–8 millimetres (0.28–0.31 in).The head is dark grey, whitish-sprinkled, face paler or whitish. Forewings are blackish, somewhat paler-sprinkled; an oblique fascia before middle, in male indistinct and sometimes interrupted, a tornal spot, and an opposite costal spot (appearing together to form a perpendicular interrupted fascia) whitish, in female whiter and more distinct. Hindwings are grey. The larva is pale yellowish-grey; head black or pale brown; 2 with two black spots

The larvae feed on bent (Agrostis species), bromes (Bromus species), cocksfoot grasses (Dactylis species), tall fescue (Festuca arundinacea), red fescue (Festuca rubra), soft grass (Holcus), crested hair-grass (Koeleria macrantha), annual meadow grass (Poa annua), Poa badensis, wood bluegrass (Poa nemoralis), common meadow-grass (Poa pratensis), rough meadow-grass (Poa trivialis), Trisetum ciliare and Triticum. Pupation takes place outside of the mine.
