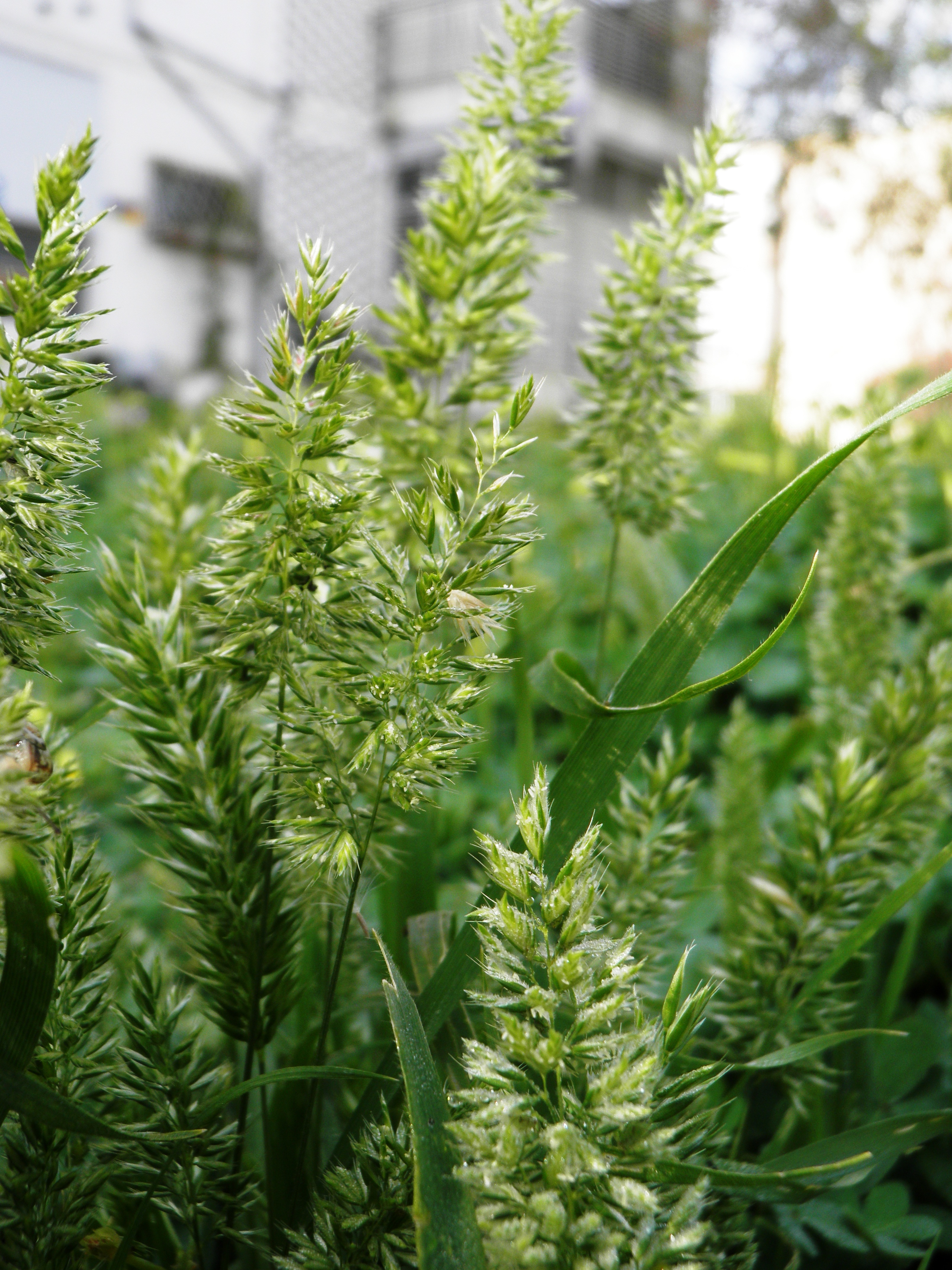
- Rostraria cristata

Scientific classification
- Kingdom: Plantae
- Clade: Tracheophytes
- Clade: Angiosperms
- Clade: Monocots
- Clade: Commelinids
- Order: Poales
- Family: Poaceae
- Subfamily: Pooideae
- Supertribe: Poodae
- Tribe: Poeae
- Subtribe: Aveninae
- Genus: Rostraria; Trin. 1820

Type species
- Rostraria pubescens (syn of R. cristata) Trin.

Synonyms
- Aegialina Schult.; Lophochloa Reichb.; Aegialitis Trin. 1820, illegitimate homonym not R.Br. 1810 (Plumbaginaceae); Aegialina Schult.; Poarion Rchb.; Lophochloa Rchb.; Wilhelmsia K.Koch 1848, illegitimate homonym not Rchb. 1828 (Caryophyllaceae); Ktenosachne Steud.; Parodiochloa A.M.Molina 1986, illegitimate homonym not C.E. Hubb. 1981 (Poaceae); Raimundochloa A.M.Molina; Trisetum unranked Rostraria (Trin.) Trin.

= Rostraria =

Genus of grasses

Rostraria is a genus of plants in the grass family, native primarily to Eurasia and North Africa with one species native to South America. Hairgrass is a common name.

These grasses are sometimes included in genus Koeleria.

Species

- Rostraria azorica S.Hend. - Santa Maria in Azores
- Rostraria balansae (Coss. & Durieu) Holub - Algeria incl. Habibas Islands
- Rostraria berythea (Boiss. & Blanche) Holub - Cyprus, Turkey, Lebanon, Syria, Iraq, Iran, Palestine, Jordan, Israel
- Rostraria clarkeana (Domin) Holub - Jammu & Kashmir
- Rostraria cristata (Linn.) Tzvelev - Mediterranean hairgrass - Mediterranean, Sahara, and southwest Asia from Portugal + Cape Verde to northern India
- Rostraria hispida (Savi) Dogan - Mediterranean from Morocco + Corsica to Turkey
- Rostraria litorea (All.) Holub - Mediterranean from Morocco + Corsica to Greece
- Rostraria obtusiflora (Boiss.) Holub - from Crete to Tajikistan
- Rostraria pumila (Desf.) Tzvelev from Canary Islands to Pakistan
- Rostraria rohlfsii (Asch.) Holub - Sahara (Algeria, Tunisia, Libya, Chad, Egypt)
- Rostraria salzmannii (Boiss.) Holub - Spain, Morocco, Algeria, Tunisia, Libya
- Rostraria trachyantha (Phil.) Soreng - Peru, Chile

formerly included

see Avellinia Trisetaria

- Rostraria festucoides - Avellinia festucoides
- Rostraria laevis - Trisetaria panicea
- Rostraria neglecta - Trisetaria panicea
- Rostraria parviflora - Trisetaria parviflora
