= Graciliotrisetum =

Scientific classification
- Kingdom: Plantae
- Clade: Tracheophytes
- Clade: Angiosperms
- Clade: Monocots
- Clade: Commelinids
- Order: Poales
- Family: Poaceae
- Subfamily: Pooideae
- Supertribe: Poodae
- Tribe: Poeae
- Subtribe: Aveninae
- Genus: Graciliotrisetum (Chrtek) Barberá & Quintanar

Genus of grasses

Graciliotrisetum is a genus of grasses. It includes two species native to the central and eastern Mediterranean basin, ranging from Corsica and Sardinia through Italy and the southern Balkan Peninsula to Turkey.

- Graciliotrisetum aureum (Ten.) Barberá & Quintanar
- Graciliotrisetum gracile (Moris) Barberá & Quintanar

The species were formerly placed in genus Trisetum. In 2024 Barberá et al. placed the species in the new genus Graciliotrisetum based on phylogenetic and morphological characteristics. They found Graciliotrisetum to be a sister clade to Trisetum flavescens, the type species of genus Trisetum.
