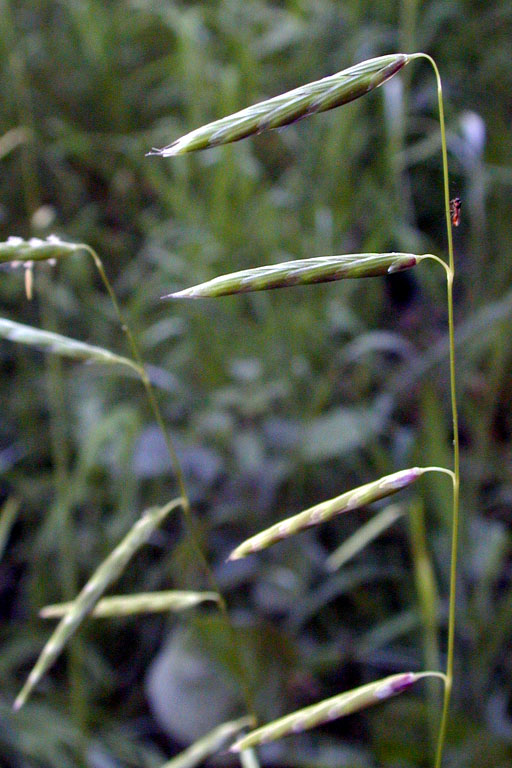

Conservation status
- Imperiled (NatureServe)

Scientific classification
- Kingdom: Plantae
- Clade: Tracheophytes
- Clade: Angiosperms
- Clade: Monocots
- Clade: Commelinids
- Order: Poales
- Family: Poaceae
- Subfamily: Pooideae
- Genus: Pleuropogon
- Species: P. hooverianus

Binomial name
- Pleuropogon hooverianus (L.D.Benson) J.T.Howell

= Pleuropogon hooverianus =

Species of grass

Pleuropogon hooverianus is a rare species of grass known by the common name North Coast semaphoregrass. It is endemic to northern California, where it is known from Mendocino, Marin, and Sonoma Counties. It grows in moist marshy areas and shady redwood forests. It is an erect perennial grass growing to a maximum height between one and 1.6 meters. The inflorescence bears widely spaced narrowly cylindrical spikelets which hang sideways off the stem, resembling semaphore signals. Each spikelet may be up to 4.5 centimeters long and may contain up to 16 flowers.
