= Pleuropogon refractus =

Conservation status
- Apparently Secure (NatureServe)

- Least Concern (IUCN 3.1)

Scientific classification
- Kingdom: Plantae
- Clade: Tracheophytes
- Clade: Angiosperms
- Clade: Monocots
- Clade: Commelinids
- Order: Poales
- Family: Poaceae
- Subfamily: Pooideae
- Genus: Pleuropogon
- Species: P. refractus

Binomial name
- Pleuropogon refractus (Asa Gray) Benth. ex Vasey
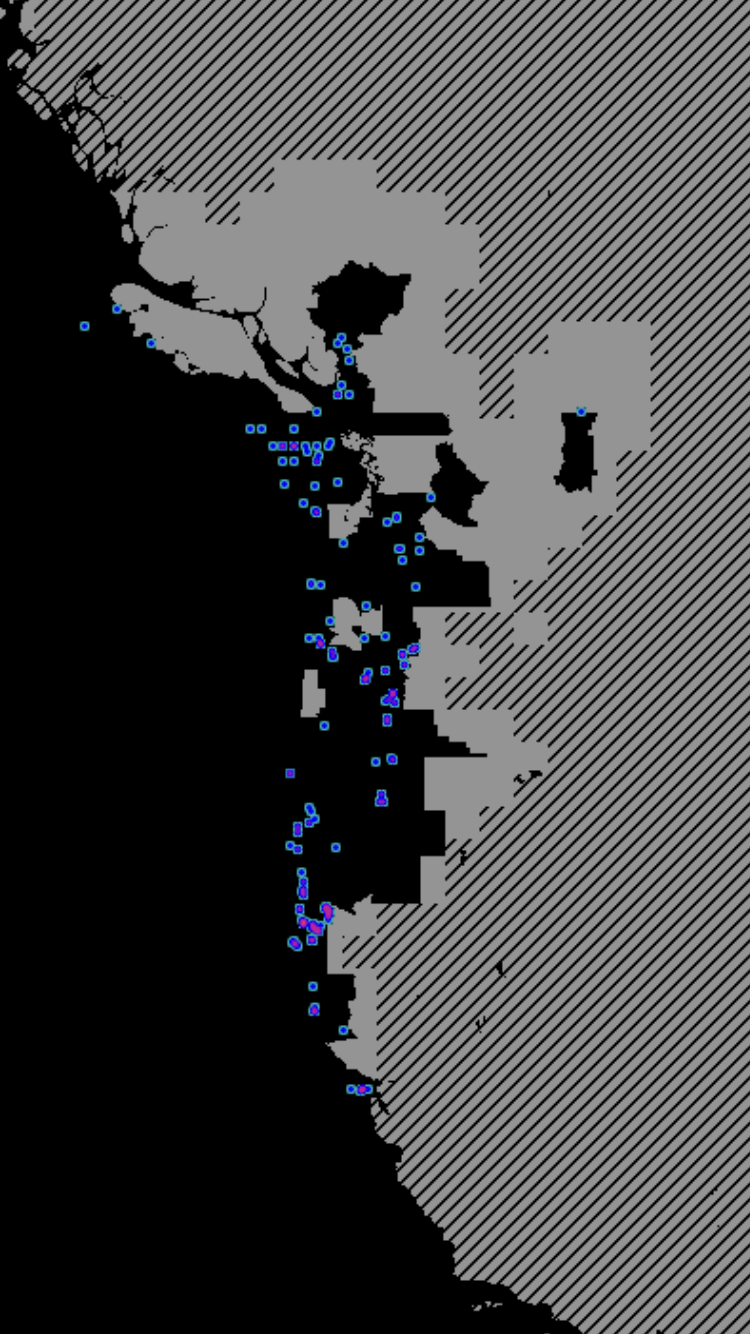
- The range of Pleuropogon refractus

Species of grass

Pleuropogon refractus is a species of grass known by the common name nodding semaphoregrass. It is native to the west coast of North America from British Columbia to northern California, where it grows in moist meadows, marshy areas, and shady forests.

== Description ==
Pleuropogon refractus is a perennial bunchgrass growing to a maximum height around 5 feet. It has a fruit type of caryopsis. The bloom period is between the months of April and August. The flower color is brown. The inflorescence bears widely spaced cylindrical spikelets which hang sideways off the stem, resembling semaphore signals. Each spikelet may be up to 2.5 centimeters long and may contain up to 14 flowers. As the spikelets develop the stem may bend over or nod, so that the spikelets point downward.

The other species of Pleuropogon in Oregon is Pleuropogon oregonus. They can differentiated by height, Pleuropogon refractus is taller, and they have different ranges. Pleuropogon refractus is west of the Cascade Mountains, while oregonus is east of the Cascade Mountains.

== Distribution and habitat ==
It grows in wet meadows, riverbanks, and shady places. Its elevations range from sea level to around 1000 meters.

It has a global NatureServe rank of G4, meaning apparently secure. It also has this rank in California and British Columbia. Washington and Oregon don't have a local rank for it. It has an IUCN rank of Least concern, and it was assessed in the first of April, 2015. The population trend is unknown.

Its communities include, redwood forests, Douglas-fir forests, yellow pine forests, and wetland-riparian.
