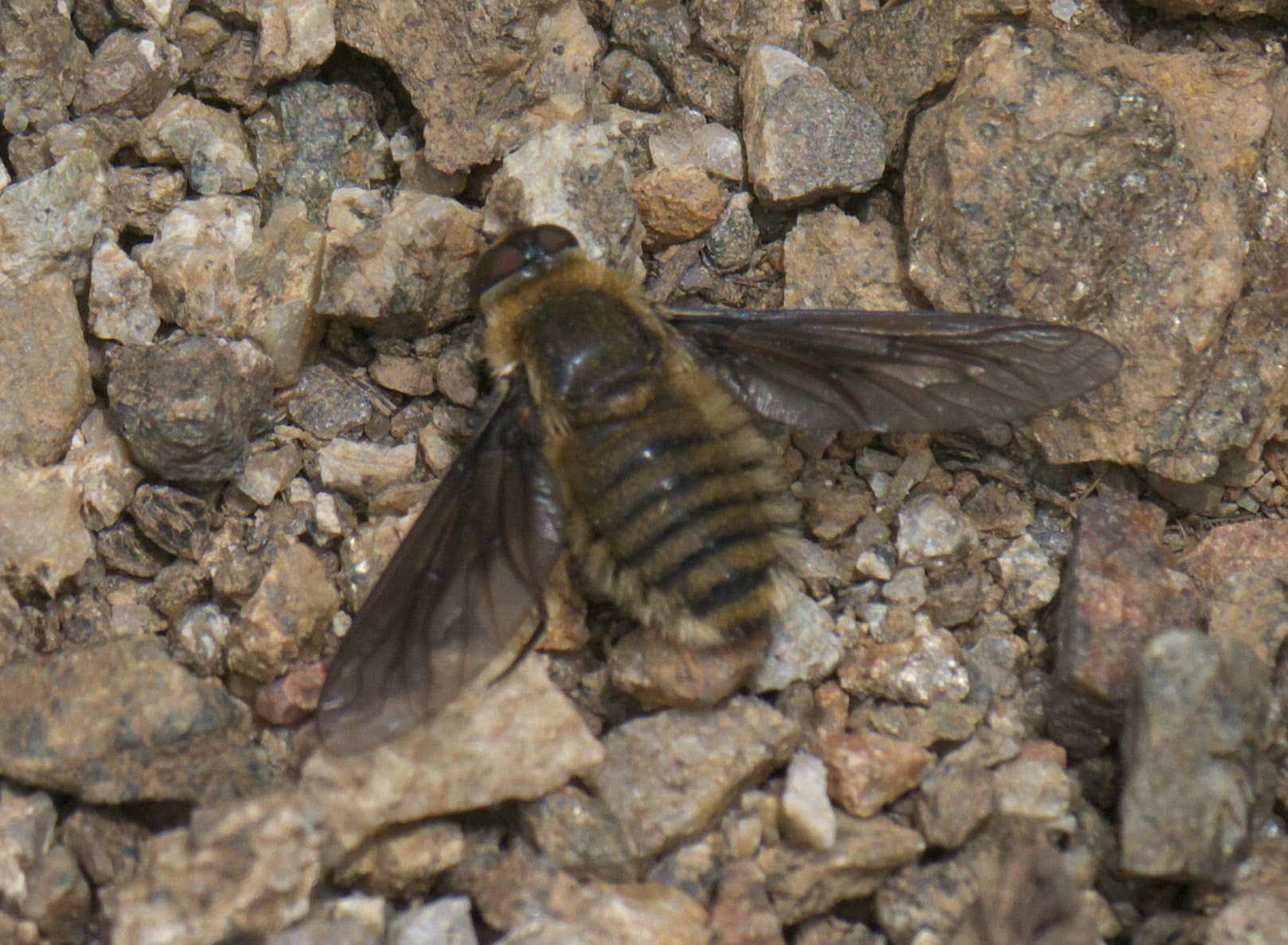

Scientific classification
- Domain: Eukaryota
- Kingdom: Animalia
- Phylum: Arthropoda
- Class: Insecta
- Order: Diptera
- Family: Bombyliidae
- Genus: Poecilanthrax
- Species: P. monticola

Binomial name
- Poecilanthrax monticola Johnson & Johnson, 1957

= Poecilanthrax monticola =

Species of fly

Poecilanthrax monticola is a species of bee fly in the family Bombyliidae. It is found in North America, from British Columbia and Alberta south to Nebraska, Utah, and Colorado.
