= Triniochloa =

Scientific classification
- Kingdom: Plantae
- Clade: Tracheophytes
- Clade: Angiosperms
- Clade: Monocots
- Clade: Commelinids
- Order: Poales
- Family: Poaceae
- Subfamily: Pooideae
- Supertribe: Melicodae
- Tribe: Meliceae
- Genus: Triniochloa; Hitchc.

Type species
- Podosemum stipoides Kunth

Genus of grasses

Triniochloa is a genus of Latin American plants in the grass family.

Species

- Triniochloa andina Luces - Cundinamarca in Colombia, Mérida in Venezuela
- Triniochloa gracilis Gómez-Sánchez & Gonz.-Led. - Guerrero, Oaxaca
- Triniochloa laxa Hitchc. - Chihuahua
- Triniochloa micrantha (Scribn.) Hitchc. - Morelos
- Triniochloa stipoides (Kunth) Hitchc. - Mexico, Central America, Colombia, Venezuela, Ecuador, Peru, Bolivia
- Triniochloa talpensis Gonz.-Led. & Gómez-Sánchez - Jalisco
