= Koordersiochloa =

Scientific classification
- Kingdom: Plantae
- Clade: Tracheophytes
- Clade: Angiosperms
- Clade: Monocots
- Clade: Commelinids
- Order: Poales
- Family: Poaceae
- Subfamily: Pooideae
- Supertribe: Melicodae
- Tribe: Meliceae
- Genus: Koordersiochloa; Merr.

Type species
- Koordersiochloa javanica (syn of K. longiarista) Merr.

Synonyms
- Pseudostreptogyne A.Camus; Streblochaete Hochst. ex Pilg.

Genus of grasses

Koordersiochloa is a widespread genus of plants in the grass family, native to Africa, tropical Asia, and various islands in the Indian Ocean.

Species

- Koordersiochloa longiarista (A.Rich.) Veldkamp - central + southern Africa (from Nigeria to KwaZulu-Natal), Réunion, Java, Philippines, Lesser Sunda Islands
- Koordersiochloa sanjappae (Kabeer & V.J.Nair) Veldkamp - State of Tamil Nadu in southern India
