= Poecilanthrax litoralis =

Scientific classification
- Domain: Eukaryota
- Kingdom: Animalia
- Phylum: Arthropoda
- Class: Insecta
- Order: Diptera
- Family: Bombyliidae
- Tribe: Villini
- Genus: Poecilanthrax
- Species: P. litoralis

Binomial name
- Poecilanthrax litoralis Painter & Hall, 1960

Species of fly

Poecilanthrax litoralis is a species of bee fly in the family Bombyliidae.
