= Poecilanthrax hyalinipennis =

Scientific classification
- Domain: Eukaryota
- Kingdom: Animalia
- Phylum: Arthropoda
- Class: Insecta
- Order: Diptera
- Family: Bombyliidae
- Tribe: Villini
- Genus: Poecilanthrax
- Species: P. hyalinipennis

Binomial name
- Poecilanthrax hyalinipennis Painter & Hall, 1960

Species of fly

Poecilanthrax hyalinipennis is a species of bee fly in the family Bombyliidae.
