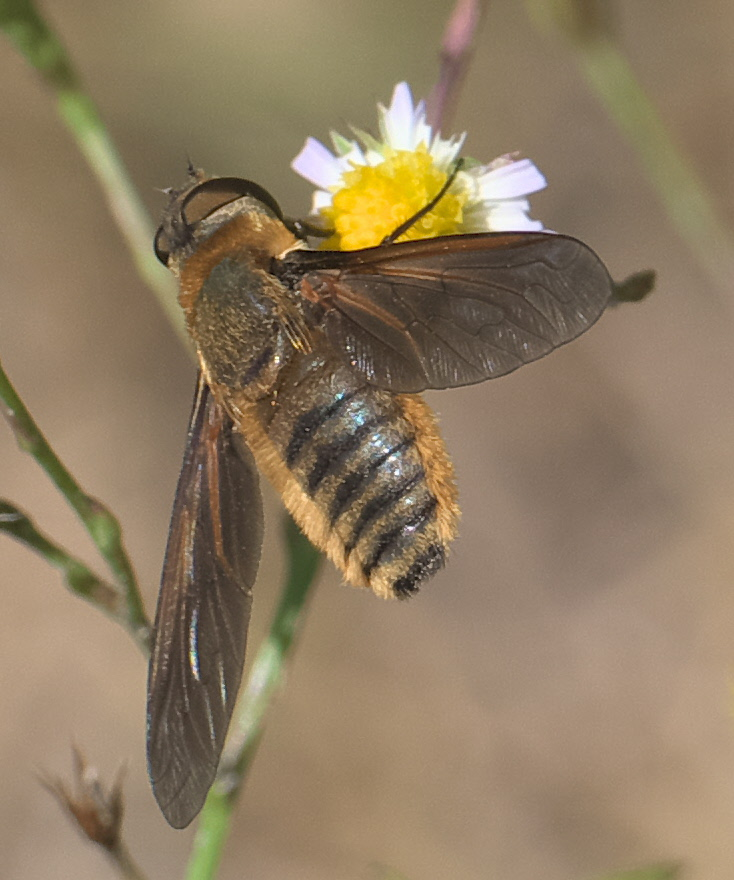

Scientific classification
- Domain: Eukaryota
- Kingdom: Animalia
- Phylum: Arthropoda
- Class: Insecta
- Order: Diptera
- Family: Bombyliidae
- Genus: Poecilanthrax
- Species: P. lucifer

Binomial name
- Poecilanthrax lucifer (Fabricius, 1775)

Synonyms
- Bibio lucifer Fabricius, 1775

= Poecilanthrax lucifer =

Species of fly

Poecilanthrax lucifer is a species of bee fly in the family Bombyliidae.
