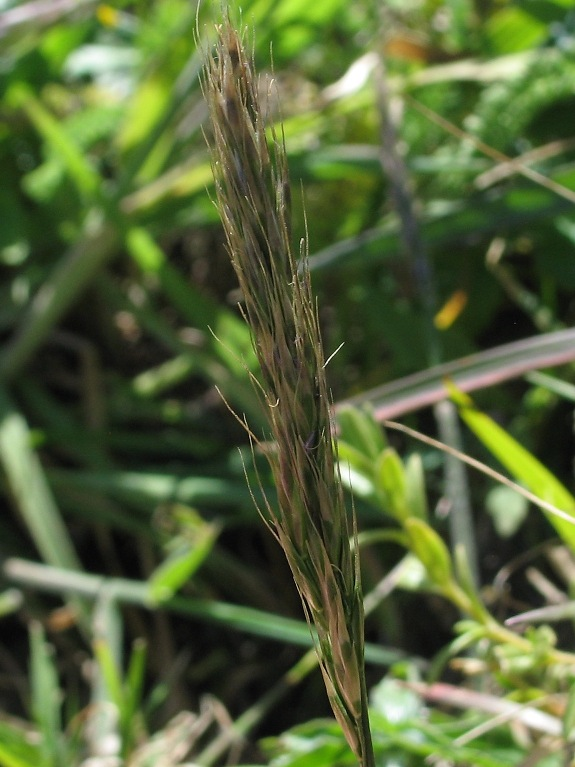

Scientific classification
- Kingdom: Plantae
- Clade: Tracheophytes
- Clade: Angiosperms
- Clade: Monocots
- Clade: Commelinids
- Order: Poales
- Family: Poaceae
- Subfamily: Pooideae
- Genus: Trisetum
- Species: T. canescens

Binomial name
- Trisetum canescens Buckley

= Trisetum canescens =

Species of flowering plant

Trisetum canescens is a species of grass known by the common names tall trisetum and tall false oat.

== Distribution ==
The bunchgrass is native to western North America, from Alaska and British Columbia to central California and Arizona, where it occurs in forests, mountain meadows, and streambanks, and is most common among Ponderosa pines and stands of spruce and fir.

== Description ==
Trisetum canescens is a perennial bunchgrass forming clumps of erect stems up to 50–80 centimetres (20–31 in) tall, but known to exceed 1 metre (3.3 ft).

There are three to four leaves per stem, the blades reaching up to 30 centimeters in length. The sheaths can be hairless to quite hairy, the hairs sometimes long and shaggy.

The inflorescence is an open or compact panicle of green, tan, or purplish spikelets up to 20 centimeters long.
