= Poecilanthrax nigripennis =

Scientific classification
- Domain: Eukaryota
- Kingdom: Animalia
- Phylum: Arthropoda
- Class: Insecta
- Order: Diptera
- Family: Bombyliidae
- Tribe: Villini
- Genus: Poecilanthrax
- Species: P. nigripennis

Binomial name
- Poecilanthrax nigripennis (Cole, 1917)

Synonyms
- Anthrax nigripennis Cole, 1917

Species of fly

Poecilanthrax nigripennis is a species of bee fly in the family Bombyliidae.
