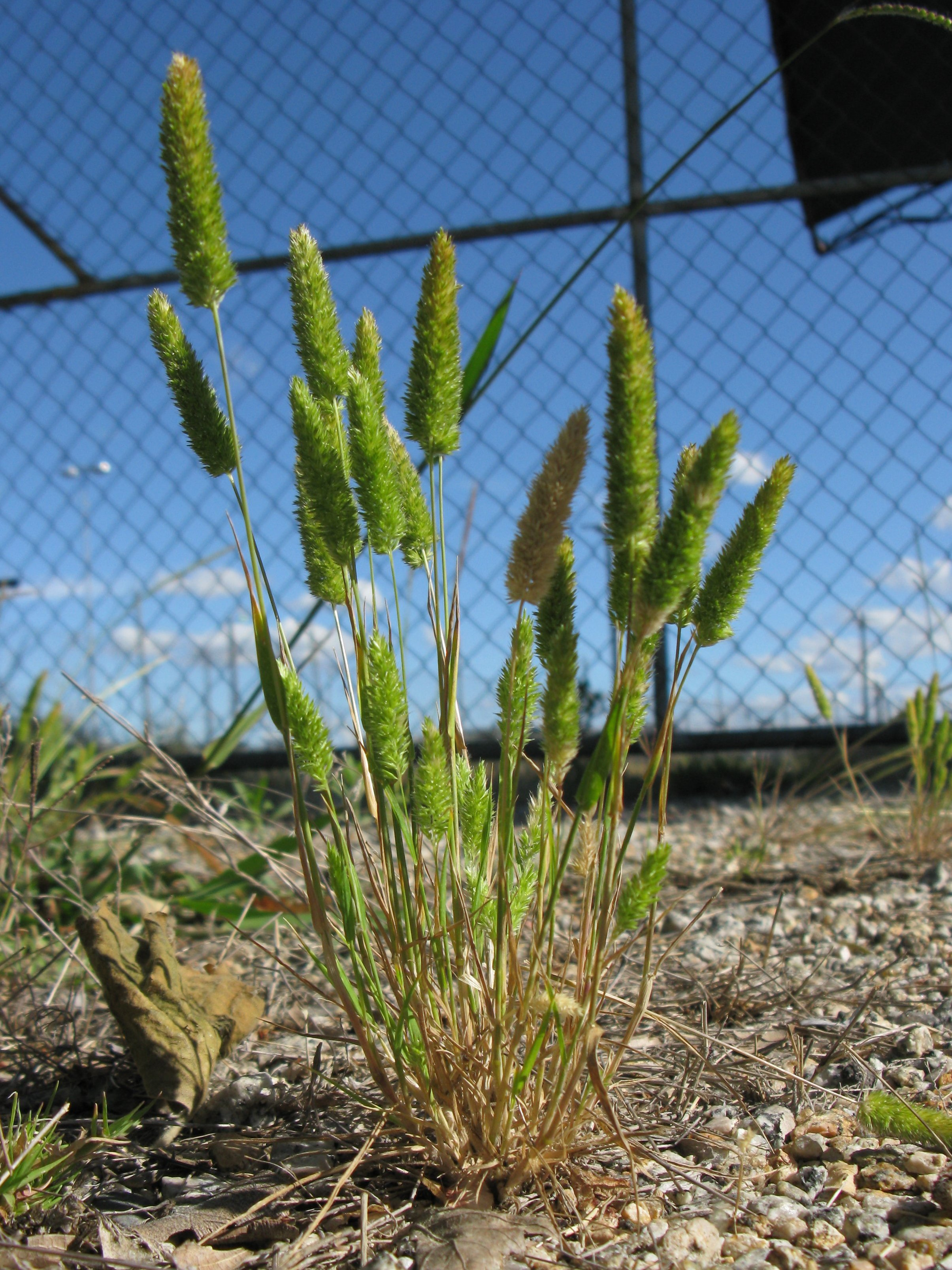

Scientific classification
- Kingdom: Plantae
- Clade: Tracheophytes
- Clade: Angiosperms
- Clade: Monocots
- Clade: Commelinids
- Order: Poales
- Family: Poaceae
- Subfamily: Pooideae
- Genus: Rostraria
- Species: R. cristata

Binomial name
- Rostraria cristata (L.) Tzvelev

Synonyms
- Festuca cristata L.; Festuca gerardii Vill.; Festuca phleoides Vill.; Koeleria gerardii (Vill.) Shinners; Koeleria phleoides (Vill.) Pers.; Lophochloa cristata (Linn.) Hyl.; Lophochloa phleoides (Vill.) Reichb.

= Rostraria cristata =

Species of grass

Rostraria cristata, the Mediterranean hairgrass, is an annual grass species which is native to Eurasia and widely naturalised throughout central and eastern Australia.
