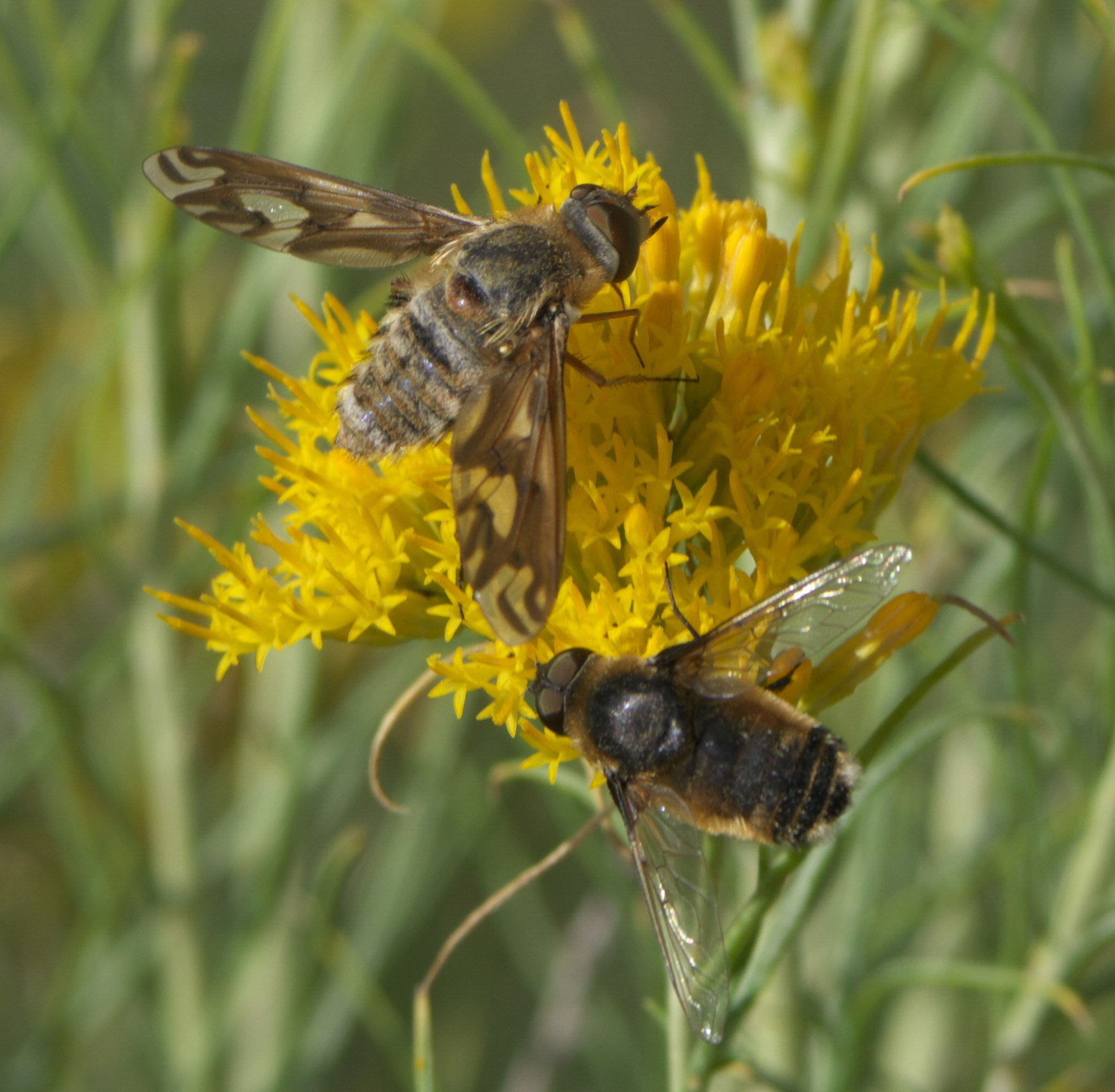

Scientific classification
- Kingdom: Animalia
- Phylum: Arthropoda
- Class: Insecta
- Order: Diptera
- Family: Bombyliidae
- Genus: Poecilanthrax
- Species: P. willistonii

Binomial name
- Poecilanthrax willistonii Coquillett, 1887

Synonyms
- Anthrax willistonii Coquillett, 1887

= Poecilanthrax willistonii =

Species of fly

Poecilanthrax willistonii, Williston's bee fly or sand dune bee fly, is a member of the Bombyliidae insect family. This family includes the bee flies, true flies that have developed Batesian mimicry characteristics to avoid predators. That is, they look like bees because that helps them avoid bee-wary predators, but they lack stingers.

P. willistonii also has larvae that act as parasitoids on other insect species. They drop their eggs strategically so that when the larvae emerge they can easily locate and consume grubs and caterpillars. The bee fly sometimes propels its eggs into holes where beetles live, and when the bee fly's eggs hatch, the larvae attack and eat the beetles' offspring. This species of bee fly lives on sand dunes, and so parasitizes sand dune insect species.

This species at a glance resembles a bee, fumbling flowers for nectar and sporting alternating orange and black bars down its abdomen. Unlike a bee, however, it has large red eyes and long, swept-back wings that it holds out from its body.

== Distribution ==
In Canada, it is found from British Columbia east to Manitoba, and its range extends south into much of the central and western United States, as well as Baja California, Mexico.
