= Poecilanthrax fasciatus =

Scientific classification
- Domain: Eukaryota
- Kingdom: Animalia
- Phylum: Arthropoda
- Class: Insecta
- Order: Diptera
- Family: Bombyliidae
- Tribe: Villini
- Genus: Poecilanthrax
- Species: P. fasciatus

Binomial name
- Poecilanthrax fasciatus Johnson & Johnson, 1957

Species of fly

Poecilanthrax fasciatus is a species of bee fly in the family Bombyliidae.
