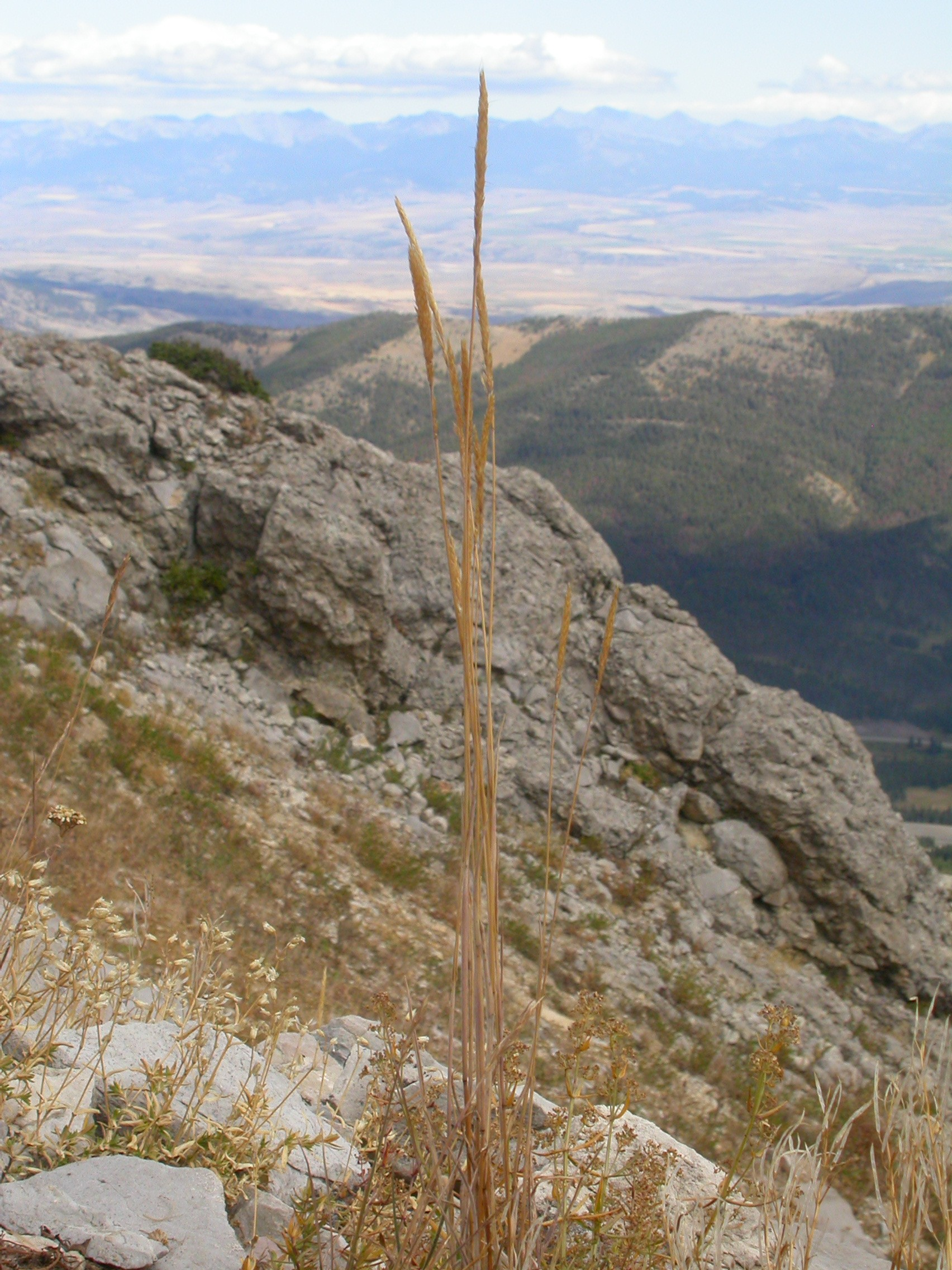

Scientific classification
- Kingdom: Plantae
- Clade: Tracheophytes
- Clade: Angiosperms
- Clade: Monocots
- Clade: Commelinids
- Order: Poales
- Family: Poaceae
- Subfamily: Pooideae
- Genus: Trisetum
- Species: T. spicatum

Binomial name
- Trisetum spicatum (L.) K.Richt.

= Trisetum spicatum =

Species of grass

Trisetum spicatum is a species of grass known by the common name spike trisetum and spike false oat. It is native to North America, Eurasia, and South America. In North America it occurs throughout northern regions, including northern sections of the United States and most all of Canada, its range continuing to Greenland. It is widespread throughout the Canadian Arctic Islands. The grass occurs in a variety of Arctic and alpine habitat types, as well as many types of mountainous habitat in regions further south. It is a perennial grass forming clumps of upright stems ranging in height from a few centimeters to over one meter. The narrow leaves are mostly located around the bases of the densely clumped stems. The inflorescence is a narrow spike a few centimeters long or up to 30 to 50 centimeters in maximum length. The spikes are green to purple or brownish and shiny.
