= Trisetum sibiricum =

Scientific classification
- Kingdom: Plantae
- Clade: Tracheophytes
- Clade: Angiosperms
- Clade: Monocots
- Clade: Commelinids
- Order: Poales
- Family: Poaceae
- Subfamily: Pooideae
- Genus: Trisetum
- Species: T. sibiricum

Binomial name
- Trisetum sibiricum Rupr.

Species of grass

Trisetum sibiricum is a species of flowering plant belonging to the family Poaceae.

Its native range is Eurasia and Northern America.
