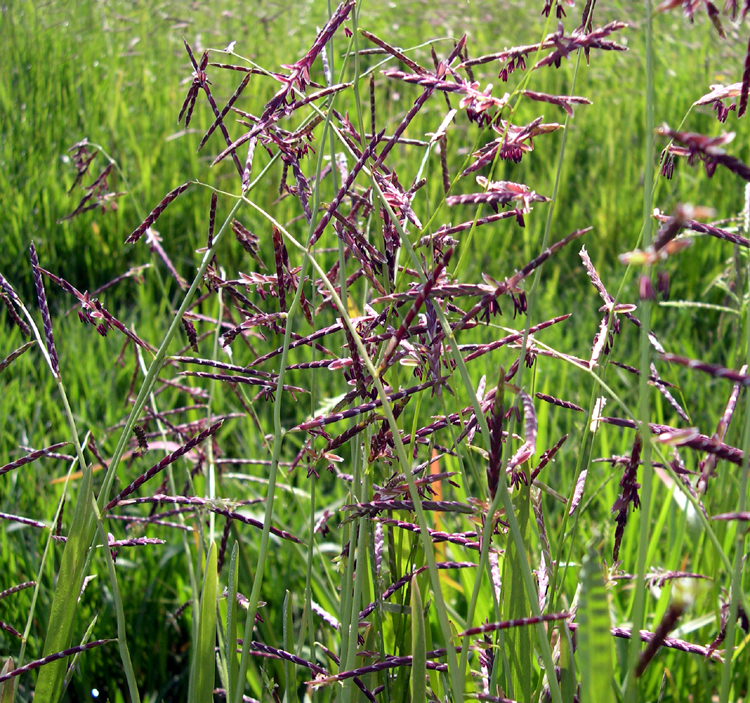
- Pleuropogon californicus

Scientific classification
- Kingdom: Plantae
- Clade: Tracheophytes
- Clade: Angiosperms
- Clade: Monocots
- Clade: Commelinids
- Order: Poales
- Family: Poaceae
- Subfamily: Pooideae
- Supertribe: Melicodae
- Tribe: Meliceae
- Genus: Pleuropogon; R.Br.

Type species
- Pleuropogon sabinei R.Br.

Synonyms
- Lophochlaena Nees

= Pleuropogon =

Genus of grasses

Pleuropogon is a genus of Arctic and North American plants in the grass family known generally as semaphore grass.

Pleuropogon native primarily to North America, with one species extending into Arctic Eurasia. These are erect grasses with drooping leaves. They grow in wet areas, sometimes even to the point of being partially submerged at times.

Species

- Pleuropogon californicus (Nees) Benth. ex Vasey - annual semaphore grass - California (from San Luis Obispo Co to Humboldt Co)
- Pleuropogon davyi L.D.Benson - northwestern California
- Pleuropogon hooverianus (G.T.Benson) Howell - North Coast semaphore grass - California (Mendocino, Sonoma, Marin Cos)
- Pleuropogon oregonus Chase - Oregon semaphore grass - Oregon (Lake + Union Cos)
- Pleuropogon refractus (A.Gray) Benth. ex Vasey - nodding semaphore grass - California (Del Norte, Humboldt, Mendocino, Marin Cos), Oregon, Washington, British Columbia
- Pleuropogon sabinii R.Br. false semaphore grass - Svalbard, Greenland, Nunavut, Yukon, Northwest Territories, Ontario, Quebec, Labrador, Alaska, northern regions of Russian Federation
