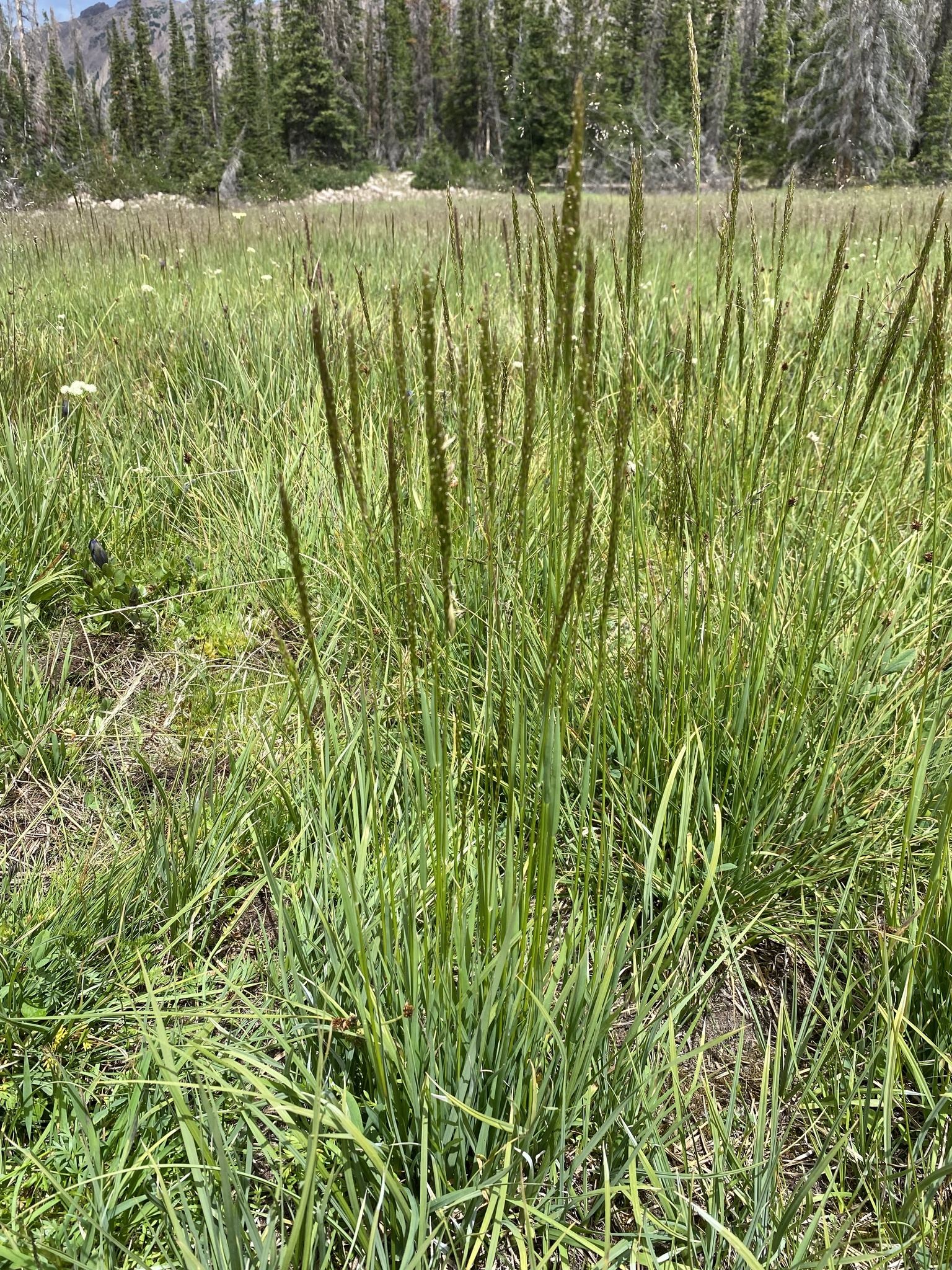

Scientific classification
- Kingdom: Plantae
- Clade: Tracheophytes
- Clade: Angiosperms
- Clade: Monocots
- Clade: Commelinids
- Order: Poales
- Family: Poaceae
- Subfamily: Pooideae
- Genus: Trisetum
- Species: T. wolfii

Binomial name
- Trisetum wolfii Vasey

= Trisetum wolfii =

Species of grass

Trisetum wolfii is a species of grass known by the common names Wolf's trisetum and Wolf's false oat. It is native to western North America, including southwestern Canada and the western United States. It occurs in mountain habitat at moderate to high elevations below the tree line, such as spruce, fir, and aspen stands. It is a perennial grass forming clumps of erect stems growing up to about 80 centimeters in maximum height, occasionally reaching one meter. The narrow leaves are mostly located on the lower third of the clumped stems. The inflorescence is a narrow, erect panicle with spikelets green, brownish, or purple in color.

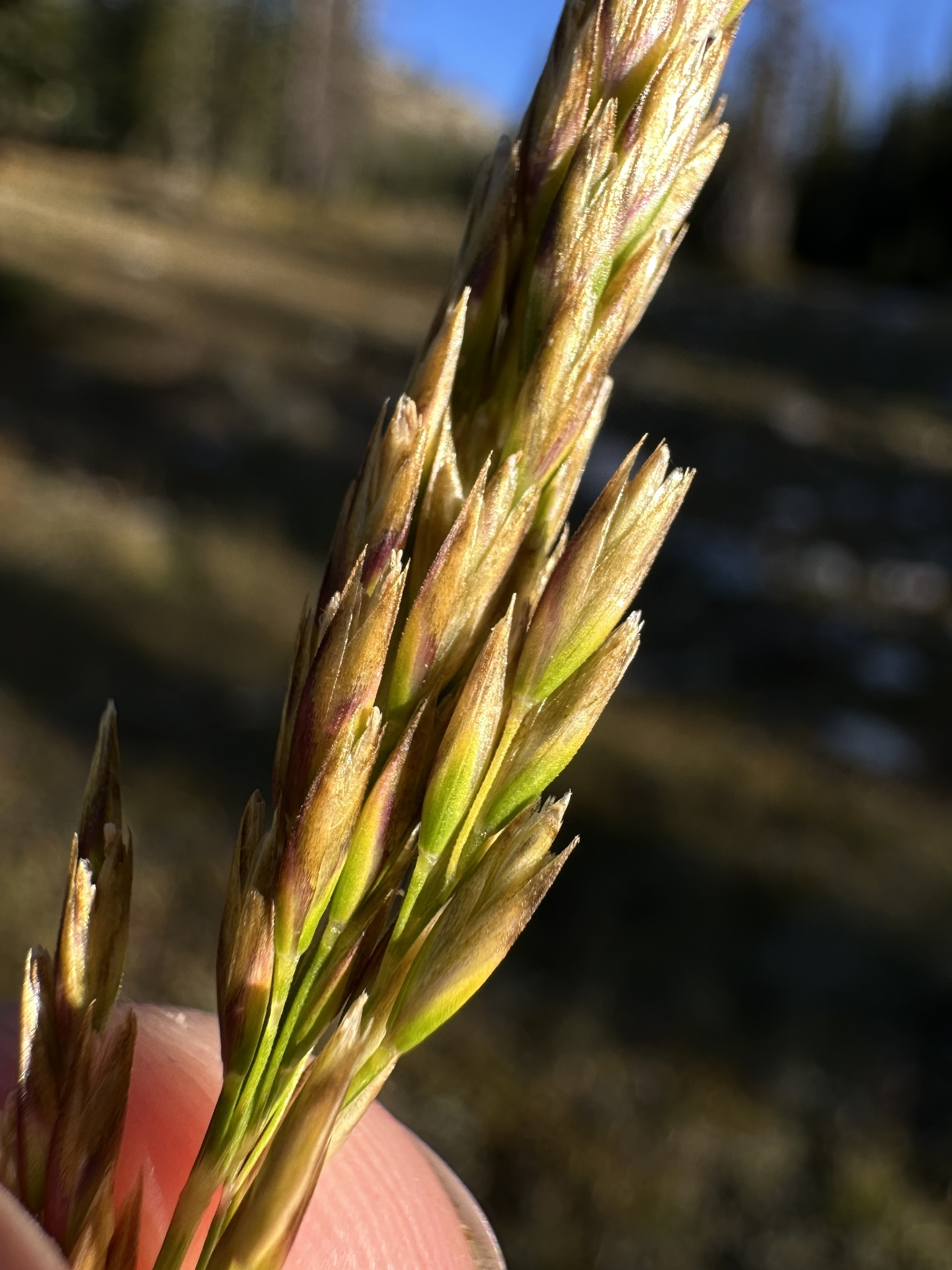
Seeds are approximately 1 cm (3/8 in) long.
