= Poecilanthrax ingens =

Scientific classification
- Domain: Eukaryota
- Kingdom: Animalia
- Phylum: Arthropoda
- Class: Insecta
- Order: Diptera
- Family: Bombyliidae
- Tribe: Villini
- Genus: Poecilanthrax
- Species: P. ingens

Binomial name
- Poecilanthrax ingens Johnson & Johnson, 1957

Species of fly

Poecilanthrax ingens is a species of bee fly in the family Bombyliidae.
