= Poecilanthrax arethusa =

Scientific classification
- Domain: Eukaryota
- Kingdom: Animalia
- Phylum: Arthropoda
- Class: Insecta
- Order: Diptera
- Family: Bombyliidae
- Tribe: Villini
- Genus: Poecilanthrax
- Species: P. arethusa

Binomial name
- Poecilanthrax arethusa (Osten Sacken, 1886)

Synonyms
- Anthrax arethusa Osten Sacken, 1886

Species of fly

Poecilanthrax arethusa is a species of bee fly in the family Bombyliidae. It is found in the southwestern United States, from Nebraska and Texas west to California. It is also found in much of Mexico, and in Central America south to Panama.
