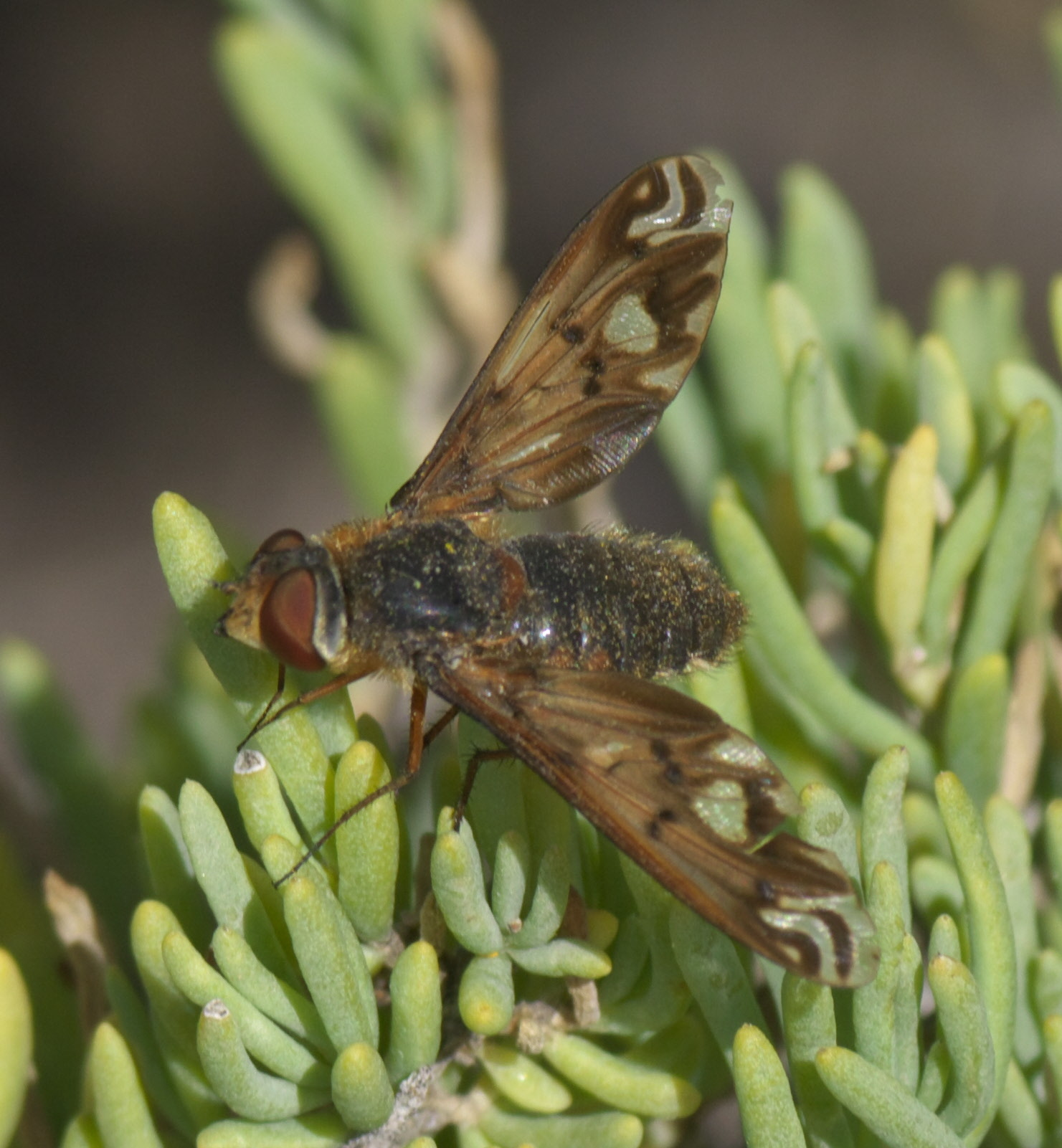

Scientific classification
- Domain: Eukaryota
- Kingdom: Animalia
- Phylum: Arthropoda
- Class: Insecta
- Order: Diptera
- Family: Bombyliidae
- Genus: Poecilanthrax
- Species: P. alcyon

Binomial name
- Poecilanthrax alcyon (Say, 1824)

Synonyms
- Anthrax alcyon Say, 1824

= Poecilanthrax alcyon =

Species of fly

Poecilanthrax alcyon is a species of bee fly. It is widespread in Canada and the United States, extending south to Mexico.
