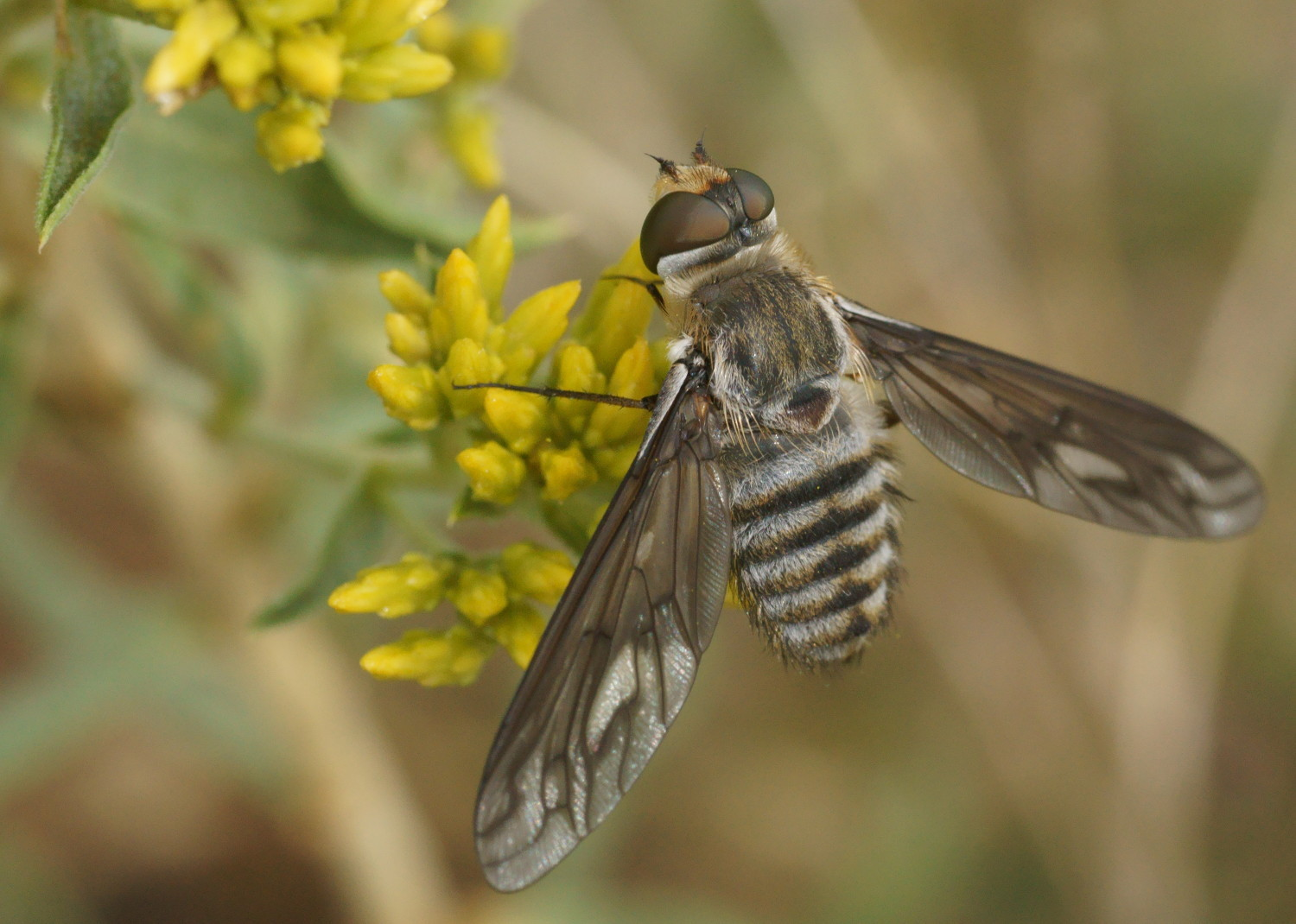

Scientific classification
- Domain: Eukaryota
- Kingdom: Animalia
- Phylum: Arthropoda
- Class: Insecta
- Order: Diptera
- Family: Bombyliidae
- Tribe: Villini
- Genus: Poecilanthrax
- Species: P. apache

Binomial name
- Poecilanthrax apache Painter & Hall, 1960

= Poecilanthrax apache =

Species of fly

Poecilanthrax apache is a species of bee fly.
