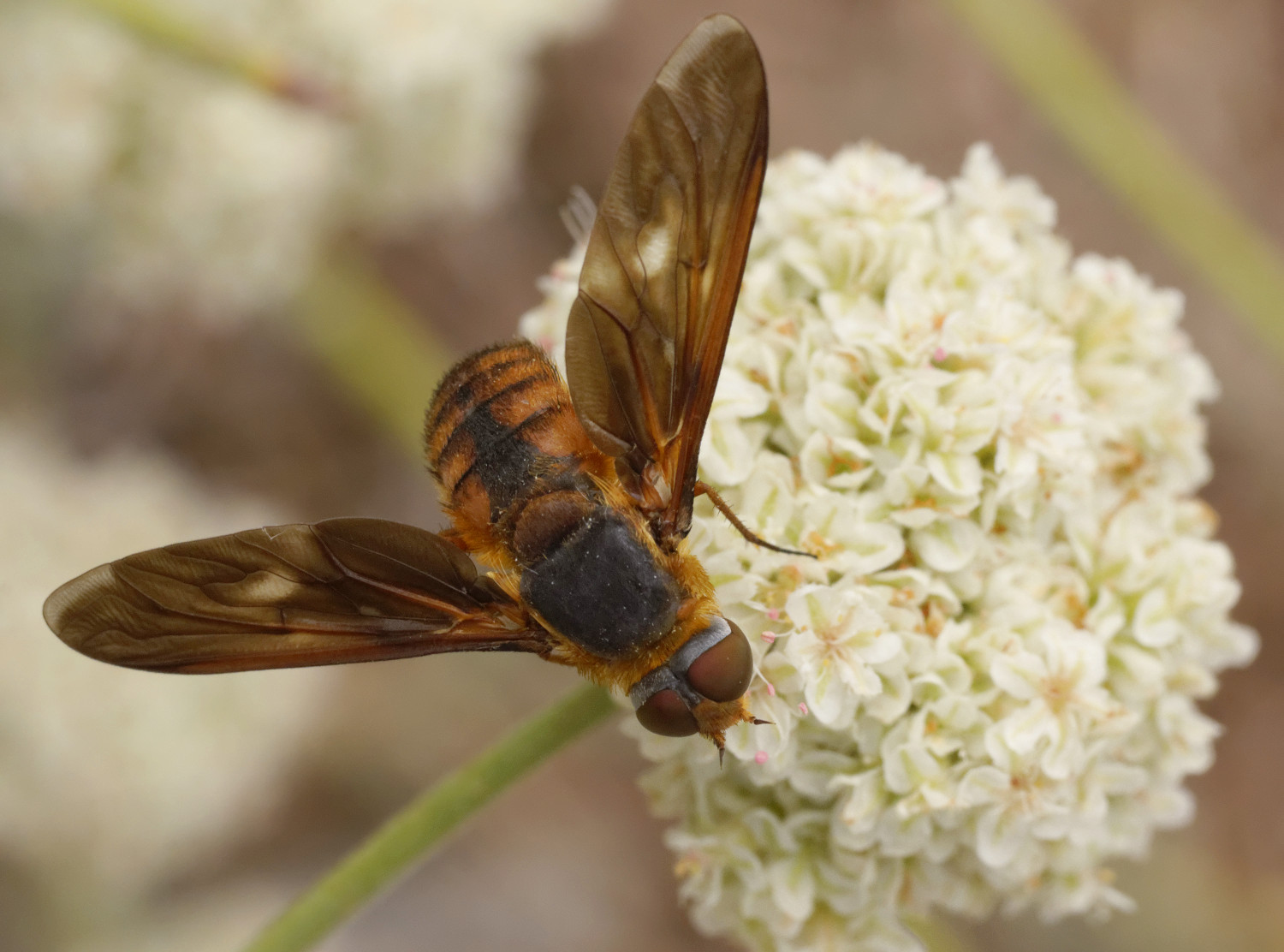

Scientific classification
- Domain: Eukaryota
- Kingdom: Animalia
- Phylum: Arthropoda
- Class: Insecta
- Order: Diptera
- Family: Bombyliidae
- Genus: Poecilanthrax
- Species: P. eremicus

Binomial name
- Poecilanthrax eremicus Painter & Hall, 1960

= Poecilanthrax eremicus =

Species of fly

Poecilanthrax eremicus is a species of bee fly in the family Bombyliidae.
