= Poecilanthrax tegminipennis =

Scientific classification
- Domain: Eukaryota
- Kingdom: Animalia
- Phylum: Arthropoda
- Class: Insecta
- Order: Diptera
- Family: Bombyliidae
- Genus: Poecilanthrax
- Species: P. tegminipennis

Binomial name
- Poecilanthrax tegminipennis (Say, 1824)

Synonyms
- Anthrax fuscipennis Macquart, 1834; Anthrax tegminipennis Say, 1824

Species of fly

Poecilanthrax tegminipennis is a species of bee fly. It is widespread in Canada and the United States.
