= Poecilanthrax alpha =

Scientific classification
- Domain: Eukaryota
- Kingdom: Animalia
- Phylum: Arthropoda
- Class: Insecta
- Order: Diptera
- Family: Bombyliidae
- Tribe: Villini
- Genus: Poecilanthrax
- Species: P. alpha

Binomial name
- Poecilanthrax alpha (Osten Sacken, 1877)

Synonyms
- Anthrax alpha Osten Sacken, 1877

Species of fly

Poecilanthrax alpha is a species of bee fly. It is widespread in the United States, extending north into Canada.
