= Lycochloa =

Scientific classification
- Kingdom: Plantae
- Clade: Tracheophytes
- Clade: Angiosperms
- Clade: Monocots
- Clade: Commelinids
- Order: Poales
- Family: Poaceae
- Subfamily: Pooideae
- Supertribe: Melicodae
- Tribe: Meliceae
- Genus: Lycochloa; Sam.
- Species: L. avenacea

Binomial name
- Lycochloa avenacea Sam.

Genus of grasses

Lycochloa is a genus of Lebanese plants in the grass family. The only known species is Lycochloa avenacea, found only in Lebanon.
