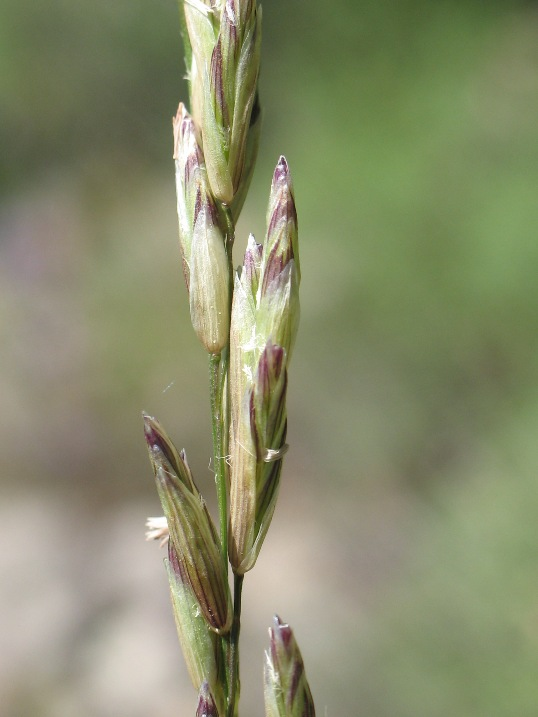

Scientific classification
- Kingdom: Plantae
- Clade: Tracheophytes
- Clade: Angiosperms
- Clade: Monocots
- Clade: Commelinids
- Order: Poales
- Family: Poaceae
- Clade: BOP clade
- Subfamily: Pooideae
- Supertribe: Melicodae
- Tribe: Meliceae; Link ex Endl. (1830)

Genera
- Glyceria; Koordersiochloa; Lycochloa; Melica; Pleuropogon; Schizachne; Triniochloa

= Meliceae =

Tribe of grasses

The Meliceae are a tribe of grasses near the base of the Pooideae. They include two relatively large genera, Melica (based on accounts in multiple regional floras) with about 80-90 species and Glyceria with about 55 species. Its other genera are Koordersiochloa, Lycochloa, Pleuropogon, Schizachne, and Triniochloa.

== Distinguishing characteristics ==
Members of the Meliceae have closed leaf sheaths; lemma veins that do not or only scarcely converge distally; and short, truncate, lodicules. They differ from Bromeae, another tribe with closed leaf sheaths, in their glabrous ovaries as well as their lemma venation and short short lodicules. They also differ from other members of the Pooideae in having chromosome base numbers of 9, 10, and 8.

== Geography and ecology ==
The Meliceae are most abundant in temperate regions of Eurasia but are also well represented in temperate regions of North and South America but there are great differences between the genera. Glyceria and Pleuropogon grow in wet areas, often in standing water; Melica and Schizachne tend to grow in dry, well-drained sites.

== Economic importance ==
Members of the Meliceae have little economic importance. A few species of both Melica and Glyceria are grown as ornamentals; more merit consideration but caution should be used. Some species of Glyceria, notably G. declinata, are invasive.
