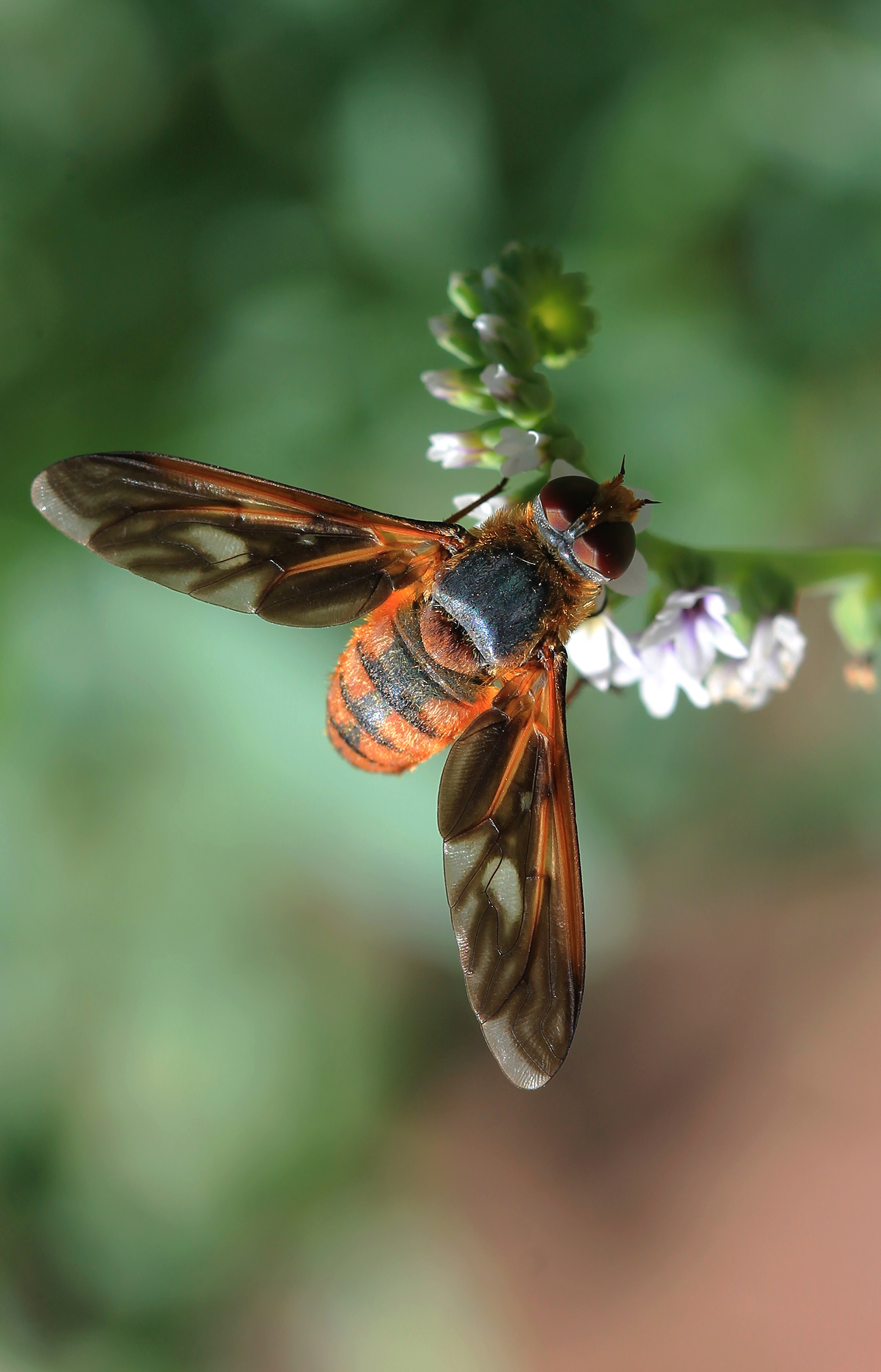

Scientific classification
- Kingdom: Animalia
- Phylum: Arthropoda
- Clade: Pancrustacea
- Class: Insecta
- Order: Diptera
- Family: Bombyliidae
- Genus: Poecilanthrax
- Species: P. effrenus

Binomial name
- Poecilanthrax effrenus (Coquillett, 1887)

Synonyms
- Anthrax effrena Coquillett, 1887

= Poecilanthrax effrenus =

Species of fly

Poecilanthrax effrenus is a species of bee fly in the family Bombyliidae.
