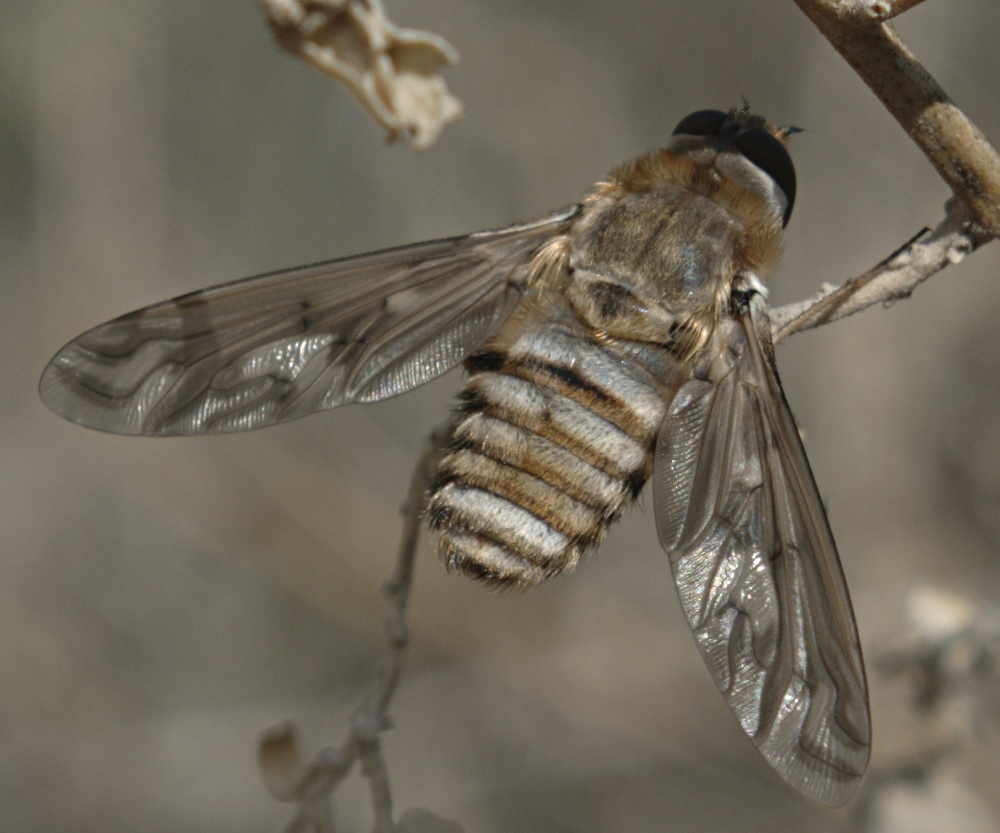

Scientific classification
- Kingdom: Animalia
- Phylum: Arthropoda
- Class: Insecta
- Order: Diptera
- Family: Bombyliidae
- Subfamily: Anthracinae
- Tribe: Villini
- Genus: Poecilanthrax; Osten Sacken, 1886

Type species
- Anthrax alcyon Say, 1825

= Poecilanthrax =

Genus of flies

Poecilanthrax is a large, primarily Nearctic genus of flies belonging to the family Bombyliidae.

These are large to large robust flies with a body length of 8–14 mm. They have large elongate pictured wings, with 2 or 3 submarginal cells and no vein M2. The abdomen is moderately lengthened, with 7 visible tergites. The front tarsi are reduced, and the tibia smooth. The larvae feed on the moth larva of members of the family Noctuidae. Adults feed on pollen.

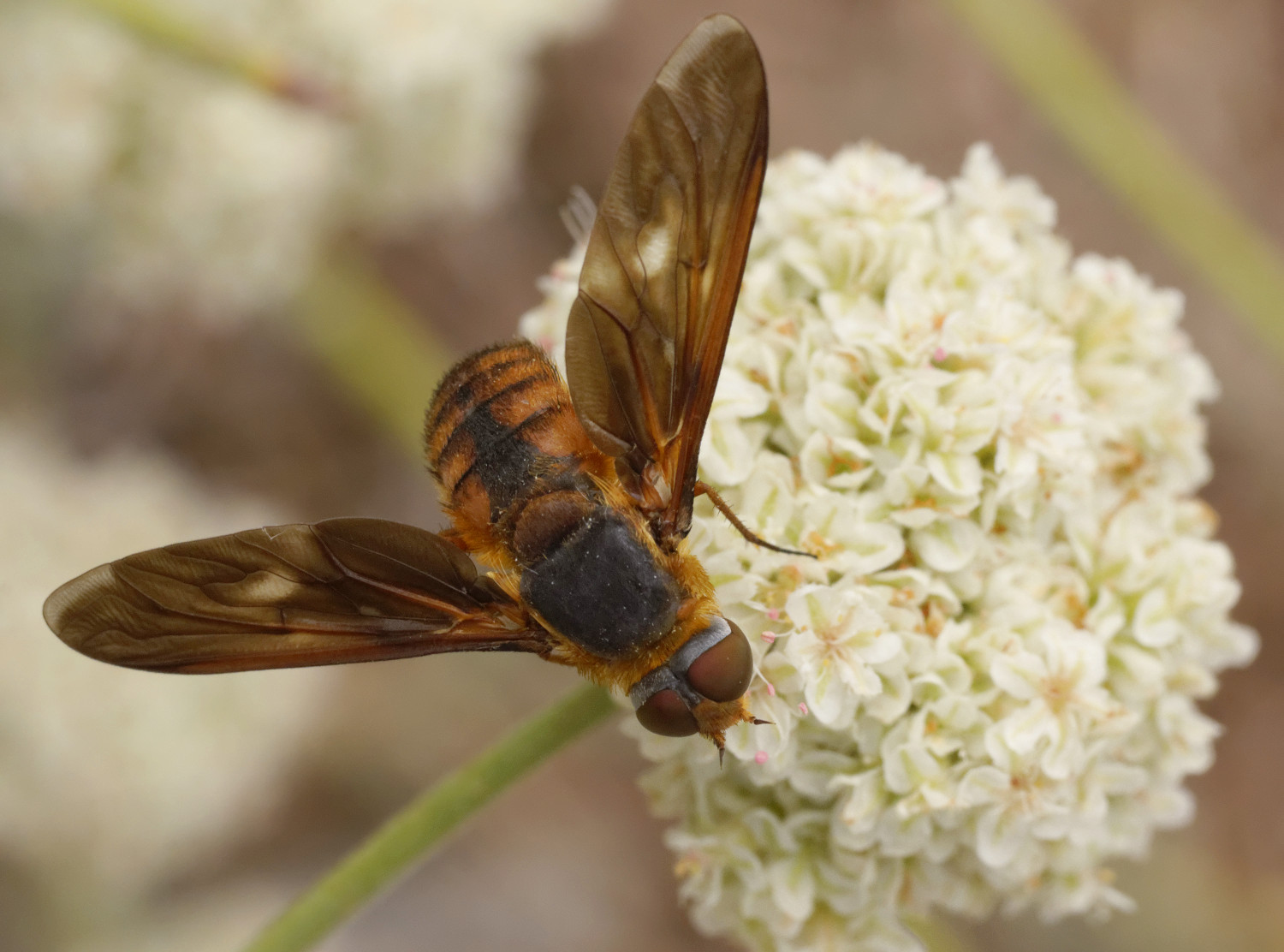
Poecilanthrax eremicus nectaring on California Buckwheat near the visitor center of Devil's Punchbowl, Pearblossom, California

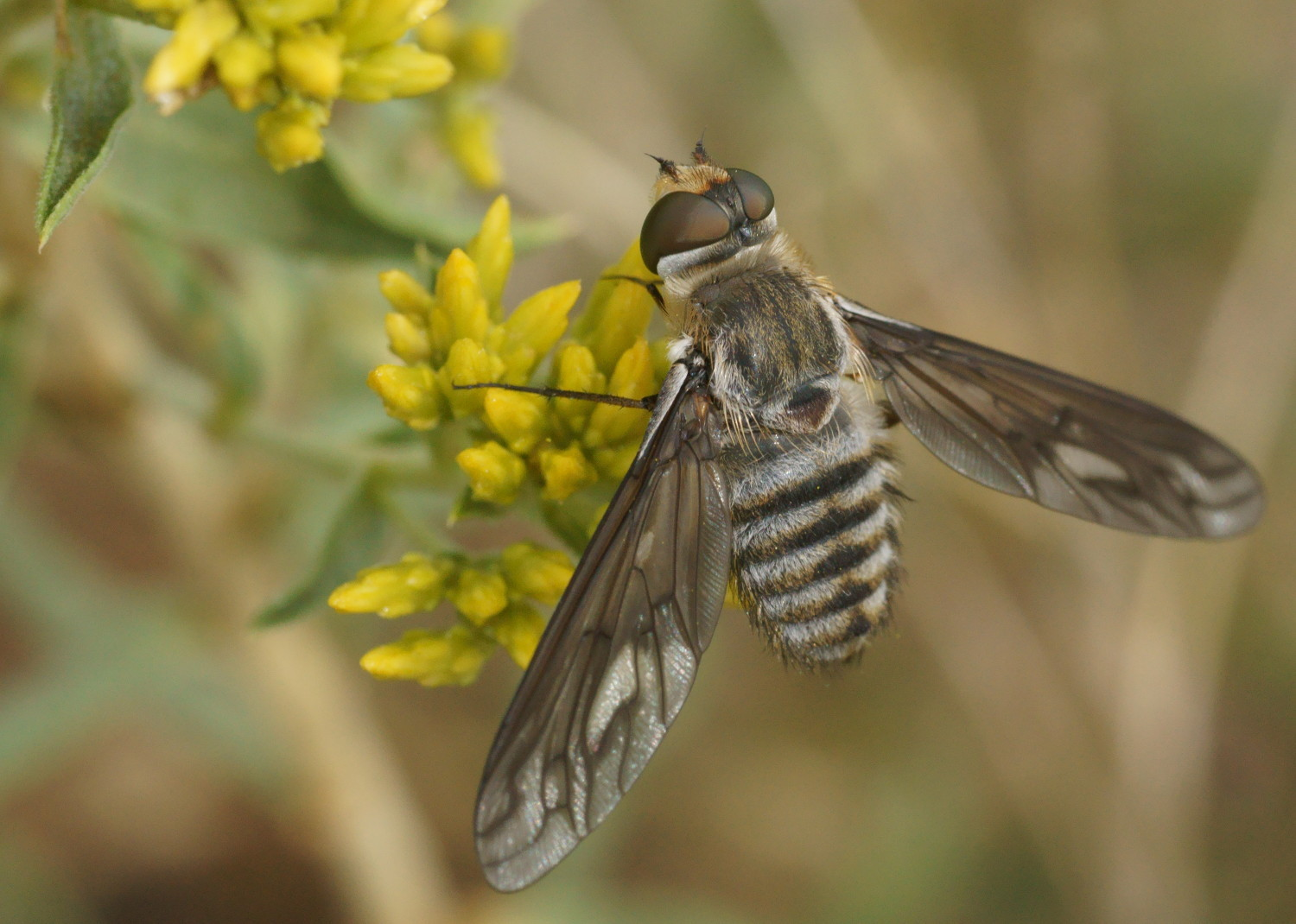
Poecilanthrax apache in Sheldon National Antelope Refuge, Nevada, US

== Species ==
- Poecilanthrax alcyon (Say, 1824)^{i c b}
- Poecilanthrax alpha (Osten Sacken, 1877)^{i c g b}
- Poecilanthrax apache Painter & Hall, 1960^{i c g b}
- Poecilanthrax arethusa (Osten Sacken, 1886)^{i c g b}
- Poecilanthrax arizonensis Taber, 2008^{c g}
- Poecilanthrax autumnalis (Cole, 1917)^{i c g}
- Poecilanthrax bicellata (Macquart, 1847)^{c g b}
- Poecilanthrax brachypus Calderwood, 1995^{c g}
- Poecilanthrax californicus (Cole, 1917)^{i c g b}
- Poecilanthrax colei Johnson and Johnson, 1957^{i c g}
- Poecilanthrax demogorgon (Walker, 1849)^{i c g}
- Poecilanthrax effrenus (Coquillett, 1887)^{i c g b}
- Poecilanthrax eremicus Painter & Hall, 1960^{i c g b}
- Poecilanthrax fasciatus Johnson & Johnson, 1957^{i c g b}
- Poecilanthrax flaviceps (Loew, 1869)^{c g}
- Poecilanthrax fuliginosus (Loew, 1869)^{c b}
- Poecilanthrax hyalinipennis Painter & Hall, 1960^{i c g b}
- Poecilanthrax ingens Johnson & Johnson, 1957^{i c g b}
- Poecilanthrax interruptus Painter & Hall, 1960^{c g}
- Poecilanthrax johnsonorum Painter and Hall, 1960^{i c g}
- Poecilanthrax litoralis Painter & Hall, 1960^{i c g b}
- Poecilanthrax loewi Evenhuis & Greathead, 1999^{c g}
- Poecilanthrax lucifer (Fabricius, 1775)^{i c g b}
- Poecilanthrax macquarti Evenhuis & Greathead, 1999^{c g}
- Poecilanthrax marmoreus Johnson and Johnson, 1957^{i c g}
- Poecilanthrax mexicanus Painter, 1969^{i c g}
- Poecilanthrax moffitti Painter and Hall, 1960^{i c g}
- Poecilanthrax montanus Painter and Hall, 1960^{i c g}
- Poecilanthrax monticola Johnson & Johnson, 1957^{c g b}
- Poecilanthrax nigripennis (Cole, 1917)^{i c g b}
- Poecilanthrax painteri Maughan, 1935^{i c g}
- Poecilanthrax pallidifrons Evenhuis, 1977^{i c g}
- Poecilanthrax pilosus (Cole, 1917)^{i c g}
- Poecilanthrax poecilogaster (Osten Sacken, 1886b)^{c g b}
- Poecilanthrax robustus Johnson and Johnson, 1957^{i c g}
- Poecilanthrax sackenii (Coquillett, 1887)^{c g b}
- Poecilanthrax signatipennis (Cole, 1917)^{i c g}
- Poecilanthrax tanbarkensis Painter and Hall, 1960^{i c g}
- Poecilanthrax tegminipennis (Say, 1824)^{i c g b}
- Poecilanthrax varius Painter & Hall, 1960^{i c g b}
- Poecilanthrax vexativus Painter and Hall, 1960^{i c g}
- Poecilanthrax willistonii (Coquillett, 1887)^{i c b}
- Poecilanthrax zionensis Johnson and Johnson, 1957^{i c g}

Data sources: i = ITIS, c = Catalogue of Life, g = GBIF, b = Bugguide.net
