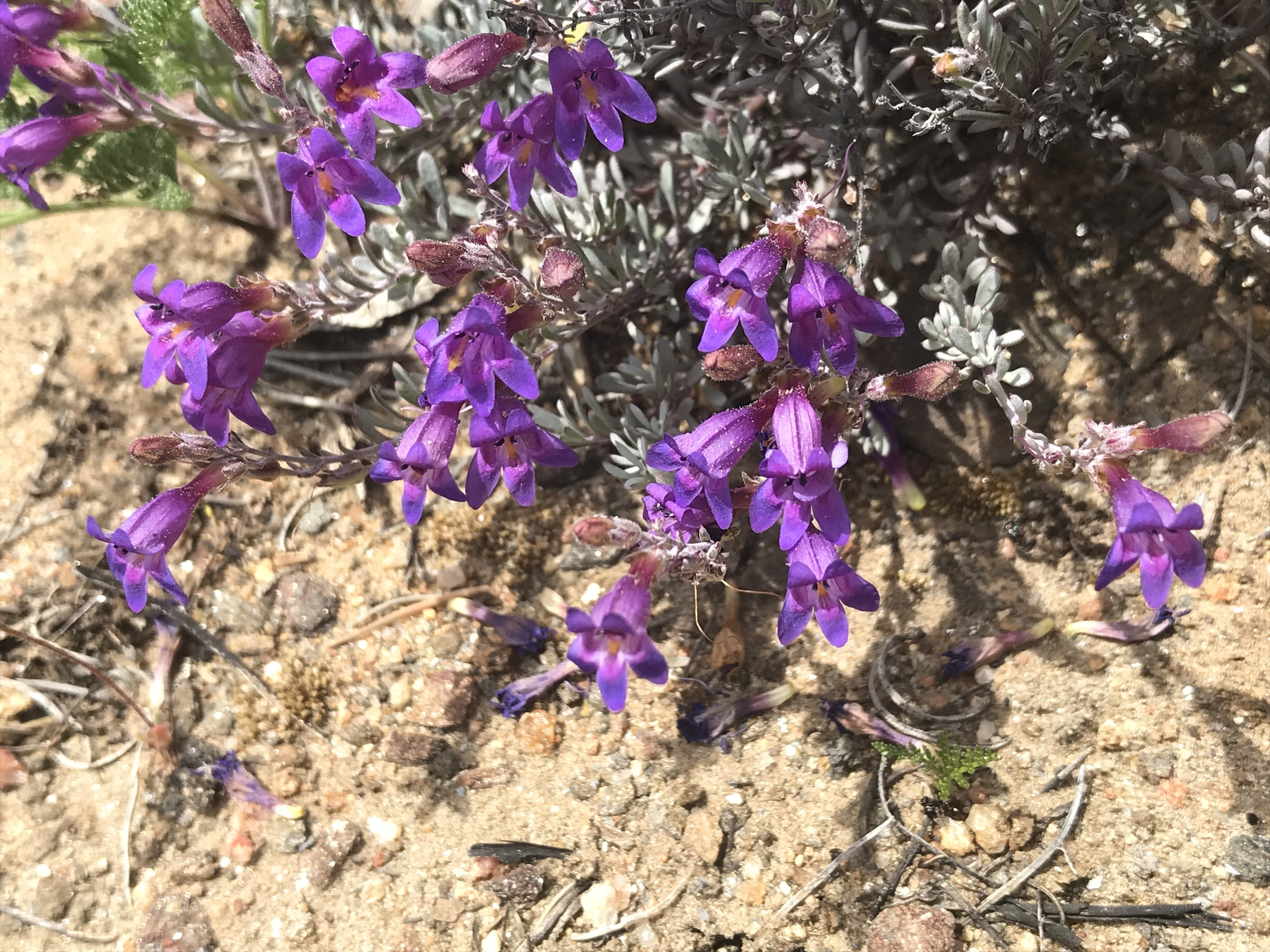
- Blooming near Constitution 1857 National Park, Baja California, Mexico

Conservation status
- Vulnerable (NatureServe)

Scientific classification
- Kingdom: Plantae
- Clade: Tracheophytes
- Clade: Angiosperms
- Clade: Eudicots
- Clade: Asterids
- Order: Lamiales
- Family: Plantaginaceae
- Genus: Penstemon
- Species: P. californicus

Binomial name
- Penstemon californicus (Munz & I.M.Johnst.) D.D.Keck

Synonyms
- Penstemon linarioides var. californicus Munz & I.M.Johnst.

= Penstemon californicus =

Species of flowering plant

Penstemon californicus is a species of penstemon known by the common name California penstemon. It is native to the Mexican state of Baja California but is also found in a few places in the American state of California. It grows in the forest and woodland habitat of the Peninsular Ranges and nearby slopes.

== Description ==
Penstemon californicus is a perennial species that typically grows 8–30 centimeters in height, but may occasionally be stunted to as little as 5 cm. The stems are herbaceous, but grow from a woody base. Stems either grow straight upwards or outwards for a short distance before growing upwards (ascending) and are covered in white scale-like hairs that point backwards.

The leaves are no more than 16 millimeters long, but may be as short as 8 mm. They range from 1.5–2.5 mm wide with a very narrow lance head shape, wider past the midpoint (oblanceolate )with a tapered base attached by a petiole and a central vein that protrudes at the end of the leaf tip (mucronate). The leaf is covered in white hairs that scale shaped, pressed close to the leaf surface, and point backwards. This makes the leaves ashy or pale in color and have smooth edges without teeth or lobes. The plants are quite leafy at the base with the flowering stems protruding from the low canopy.

The inflorescence produces tubular flowers between 14 and 18 millimeters long, purple to blue in color with dark-striped white throats containing hairy staminodes.

== Taxonomy ==
Penstemon californicus was scientifically described in 1924 by Philip A. Munz and Ivan Murray Johnston as a variety of Penstemon linarioides. In 1937 David D. Keck published a new description as a species under its present name. The species is considered valid by Plants of the World Online, World Plants, and World Flora Online.

=== Names ===
It is known by the common names California penstemon and San Jacinto penstemon.

== Range and habitat ==
This species is found in Baja California and in southern California. In the state of California it is found in less than twenty locations in the San Jacinto Mountains in Orange County and Riverside County. In Baja California they grow in Sierra de Juárez and Sierra de San Pedro Mártir, mostly above 1,600 meters (5,200 ft).

Penstemon californicus grows in pine-juniper woodlands and pine forests in sandy or gravel soils. In Baja California it mostly grows on gravelly hillsides and in dry stream beds.

== See also ==
List of Penstemon species
