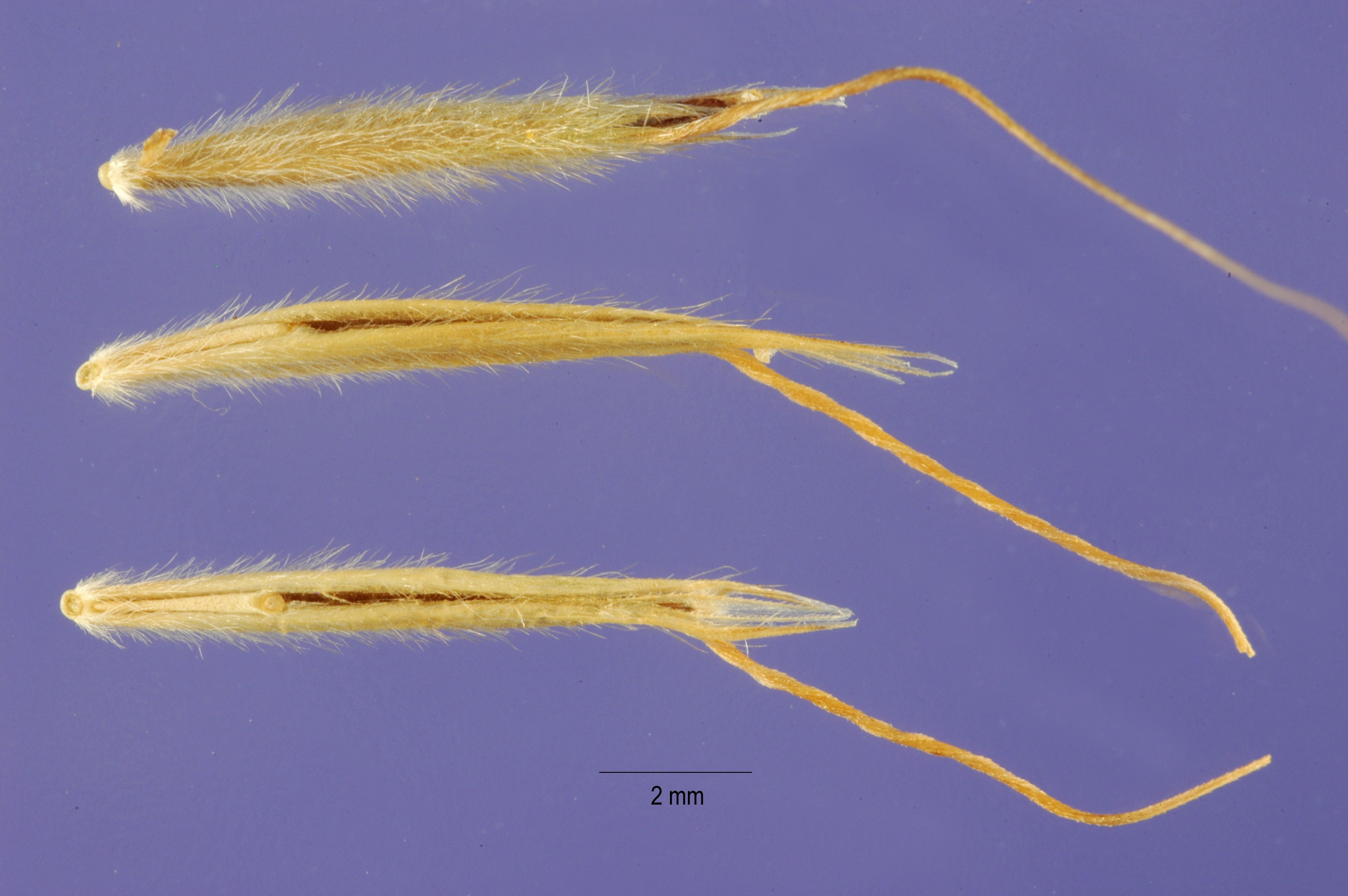

Scientific classification
- Kingdom: Plantae
- Clade: Tracheophytes
- Clade: Angiosperms
- Clade: Monocots
- Clade: Commelinids
- Order: Poales
- Family: Poaceae
- Subfamily: Pooideae
- Genus: Bromus
- Species: B. berteroanus

Binomial name
- Bromus berteroanus Colla

Synonyms
- List: Trisetum hirtum Trin.; Bromus bicuspis Nees ex Steud.; Bromus trinii É.Desv.; Bromus trinii var. effusus É.Desv.; Bromus trinii var. manicatus É.Desv.; Bromus trinii var. micrantherus É.Desv.; Bromus trinii var. pallidiflorus É.Desv.; Bromus trinii var. strictus É.Desv.; Trisetum barbatum Steud.; Danthonia pseudospicata Müll.Hal.; Avena paupercula Phil.; Trisetum litorale Phil.; Trisetum barbatum var. major Vasey; Bromus barbatoides Beal; Bromus barbatoides var. sulcatus Beal; Bromus leyboldtii Phil.; Bromus trinii var. excelsus Shear; Trisetum trinii var. majus (Vasey) Louis-Marie; Trisetum trinii var. effusum (É.Desv.) Louis-Marie; Trisetum trinii var. litorale (Phil.) Louis-Marie; Trisetum trinii var. manicatum (É.Desv.) Louis-Marie; Trisetum trinii var. micrantherum (É.Desv.) Louis-Marie; Trisetum trinii var. pallidiflorus (É.Desv.) Louis-Marie; Trisetum trinii var. strictum (É.Desv.) Louis-Marie; Trisetum trinii (É.Desv.) Louis-Marie; Trisetobromus hirtus (Trin.) Nevski; Bromus berteroanus var. excelsus (Shear) Pavlick

= Bromus berteroanus =

Species of grass

Bromus berteroanus, commonly known as Chilean chess, is a species of annual grass in the family Poaceae native to drier areas of North and South America.

== Description ==
Bromus berteroanus has culms 10 to 80 cm (3.9 to 31.5 in) long, with lightly hairy leaf sheaths and hairless ligules. Its leaf blades are 5 to 20 cm (2.0 to 7.9 in) long. Its inflorescence is a dense panicle of 5 to 15 cm (2.0 to 5.9 in), with branches which are lightly rough to the touch. Its spikelets are solitary, and fertile spikelets have pedicels which are also lightly rough to the touch. Each lanceolate spikelet has three to five florets, and the spikelets break up at maturity and disarticulate below these florets. Its glumes are shorter than the spikelets and thinner than fertile lemmas. Both upper and lower glumes are lanceolate. Fertile lemmas are 10 to 12 mm (3/8 to 1/2 in) long with seven veins.

== Distribution and habitat ==
Bromus berteroanus is named after its occurrence in Chile, though it is native across western South America; it is native to Ecuador, Peru, Chile, Bolivia, and Argentina, and it has been introduced to the western United States from Oregon through California down to Baja California and east to Utah and Nevada. It prefers dry areas in subtropical environments.
