= Trisetum ciliare =

Scientific classification
- Kingdom: Plantae
- Clade: Tracheophytes
- Clade: Angiosperms
- Clade: Monocots
- Clade: Commelinids
- Order: Poales
- Family: Poaceae
- Subfamily: Pooideae
- Genus: Trisetum
- Species: T. ciliare

Binomial name
- Trisetum ciliare (Kit.) Domin

Synonyms
- Trisetum fuscum (Kit. ex Schult.) Roem. & Schult.

Species of plant

Trisetum ciliare is a species of grass in the family Poaceae.
