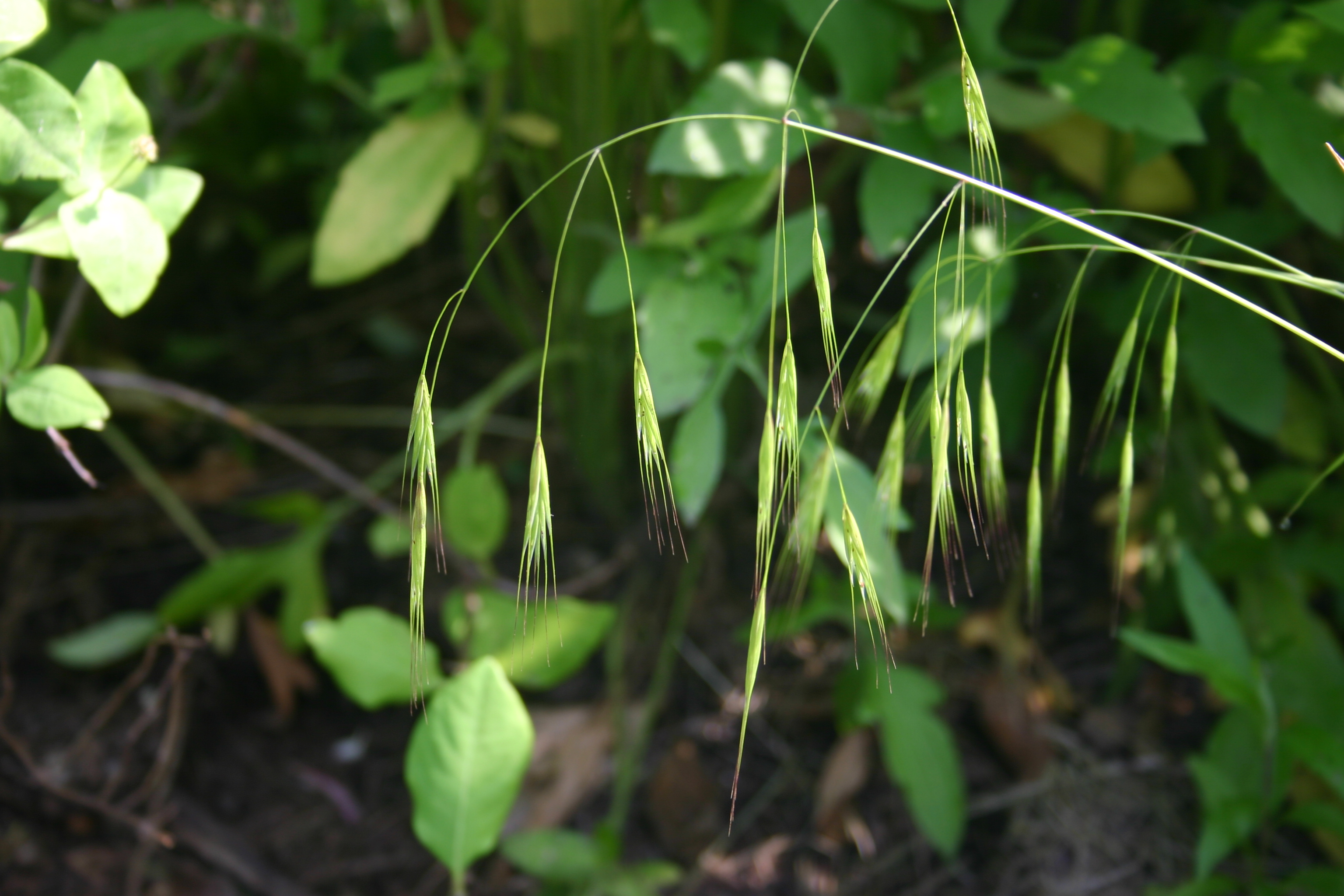

Scientific classification
- Kingdom: Plantae
- Clade: Tracheophytes
- Clade: Angiosperms
- Clade: Monocots
- Clade: Commelinids
- Order: Poales
- Family: Poaceae
- Subfamily: Pooideae
- Tribe: Meliceae
- Genus: Schizachne; Hack.
- Species: S. purpurascens

Binomial name
- Schizachne purpurascens (Torr.) Swallen

Synonyms
- Of the species: Melica purpurascens (Torr.) Hitchc.; Trisetum purpurascens Torr.; Of subsp. callosa: List: Avena callosa Turcz. ex Griseb.; Melica callosa (Turcz. ex Griseb.) Ohwi; Schizachne callosa (Turcz. ex Griseb.) Ohwi; Schizachne fauriei Hack.; Schizachne purpurascens var. callosa (Turcz. ex Griseb.) Kitag.; Of subsp. capillipes: List: Avena striata' subsp. capillipes Kom.; Schizachne komarovii Roshev.; Of subsp. purpurascens: List: Avena striata Michx., nom. illeg.; Avena torreyi Nash; Bromelica striata (Hitchc.) Farw.; Melica striata Hitchc.; Schizachne purpurascens var. pubescens Dore; Schizachne striata (Hitchc.) Hultén

= Schizachne =

Species of plant

Schizachne is a genus of Eurasian and North American plants in the grass family. The only accepted species is Schizachne purpurascens, commonly called false melic. Three subspecies are recognized:

- Schizachne purpurascens subsp. callosa (Turcz. ex Griseb.) T.Koyama & Kawano – European and Asiatic Russia, China (Hebei, Heilongjiang, Henan, Jilin, Liaoning, Shanxi, Yunnan), Mongolia, Korea, Kazakhstan
- Schizachne purpurascens subsp. capillipes (Kom.) Tzvelev – Kamchatka
- Schizachne purpurascens subsp. purpurascens – Canada (all 10 provinces plus Yukon + NWT), United States (Alaska, Rocky Mountain States, Great Lakes Region, Northeast)

Melica smithii was formerly included in the genus, as Schizachne smithii.
