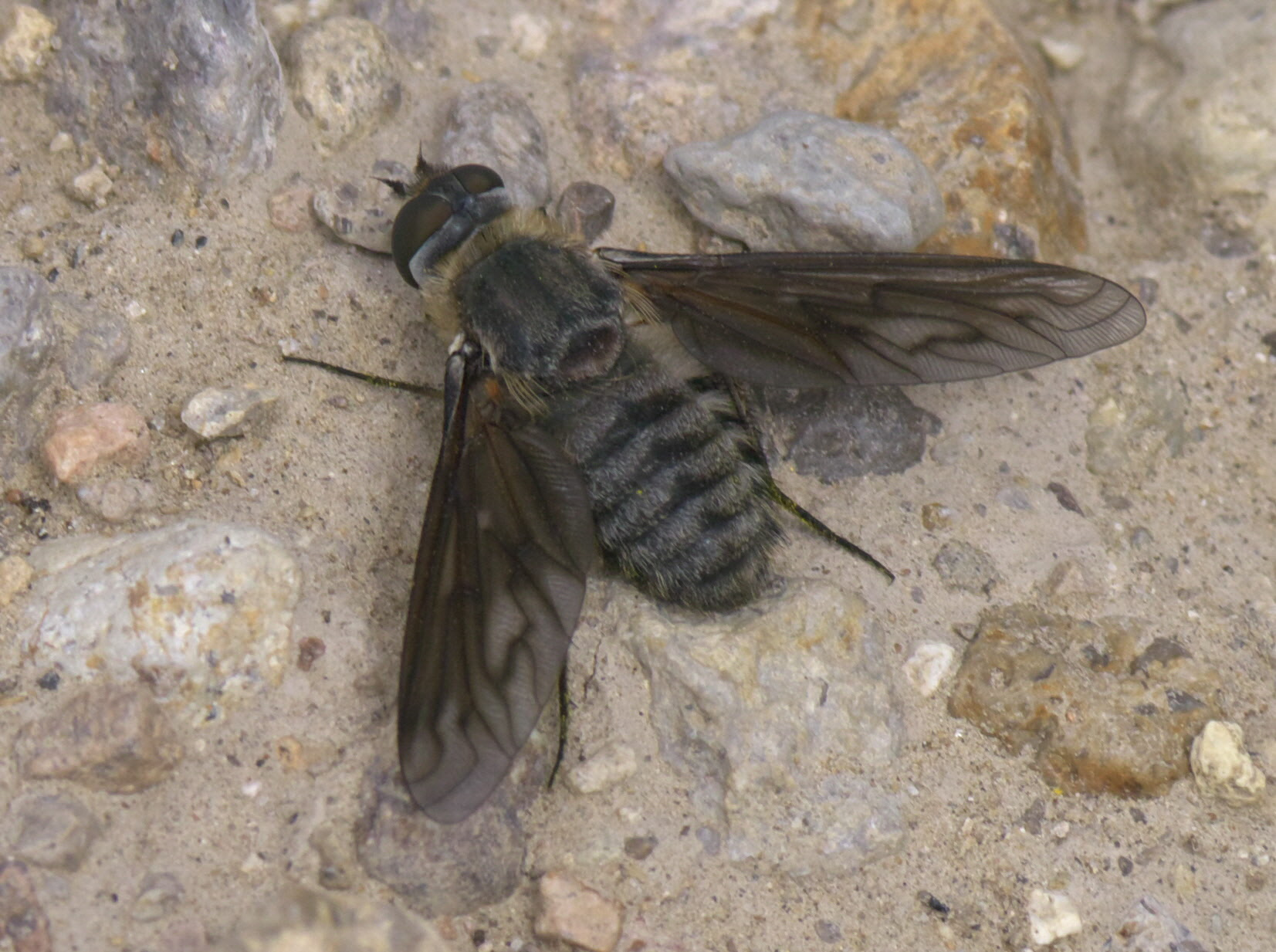

Scientific classification
- Domain: Eukaryota
- Kingdom: Animalia
- Phylum: Arthropoda
- Class: Insecta
- Order: Diptera
- Family: Bombyliidae
- Tribe: Villini
- Genus: Poecilanthrax
- Species: P. californicus

Binomial name
- Poecilanthrax californicus (Cole, 1917)

Synonyms
- Anthrax californicus Cole, 1917

= Poecilanthrax californicus =

Species of fly

Poecilanthrax californicus is a species of bee fly in the family Bombyliidae.
