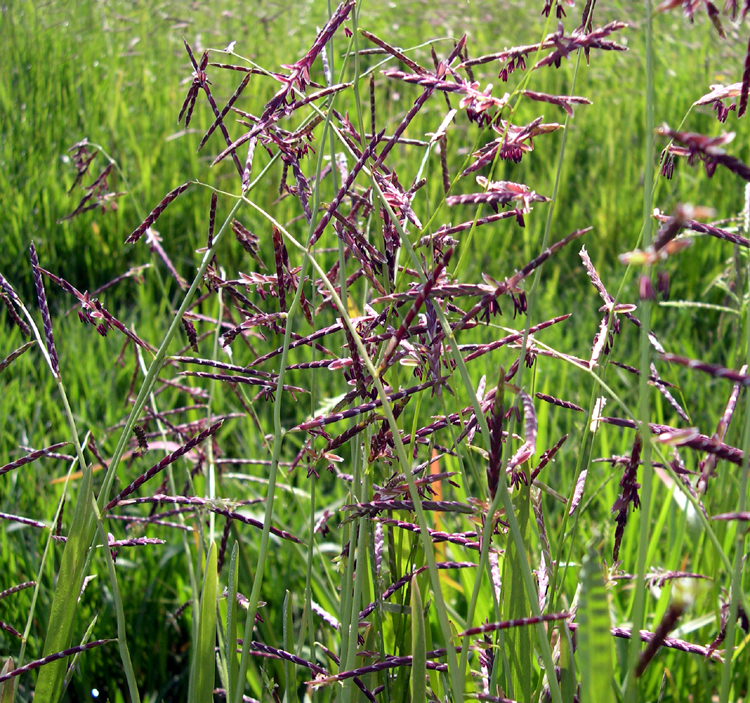

Scientific classification
- Kingdom: Plantae
- Clade: Tracheophytes
- Clade: Angiosperms
- Clade: Monocots
- Clade: Commelinids
- Order: Poales
- Family: Poaceae
- Subfamily: Pooideae
- Genus: Pleuropogon
- Species: P. californicus

Binomial name
- Pleuropogon californicus (Nees) Benth. ex Vasey

Synonyms
- Pleuropogon davyi

= Pleuropogon californicus =

Species of grass

Pleuropogon californicus is a species of grass known by the common name annual semaphoregrass. It is endemic to northern California, where it grows in moist woodland and forest habitat, including redwood forests and nearby wetlands.

== Description ==
Pleuropogon californicus is an annual or perennial bunch grass growing decumbent or erect in clumps of stems up to nearly 1 metre (3.3 ft) in maximum height.

The inflorescence bears widely spaced narrowly cylindrical spikelets which hang sideways off the stem, resembling semaphore signals. Each spikelet may be up to 5 centimeters long and may contain 20 flowers.
