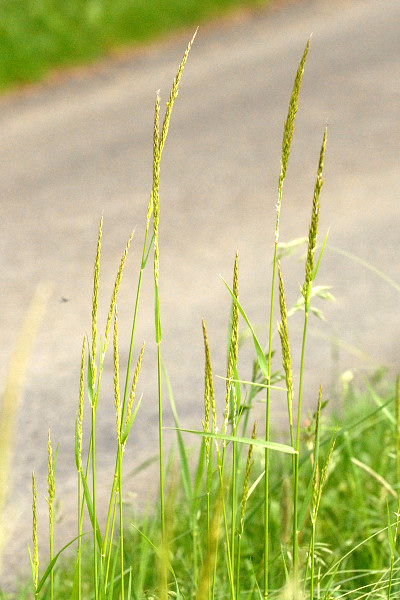

Scientific classification
- Kingdom: Plantae
- Clade: Embryophytes
- Clade: Tracheophytes
- Clade: Spermatophytes
- Clade: Angiosperms
- Clade: Monocots
- Clade: Commelinids
- Order: Poales
- Family: Poaceae
- Subfamily: Pooideae
- Genus: Trisetum
- Species: T. flavescens

Binomial name
- Trisetum flavescens (L.) P.Beauv.

= Trisetum flavescens =

Species of grass

Trisetum flavescens, the yellow oatgrass or golden oat grass, is a species of grass in the family Poaceae. It is native to Europe, Asia, and North Africa.

It can be found elsewhere, such as sections of North America, where it was introduced as a rangeland grass for grazing. It now exists in the wild as a common weed.

== Description ==
Trisetum flavescens is a perennial bunchgrass growing in clumps up to 60–80 centimetres (24–31 in) tall, and known to exceed 1 metre (3.3 ft) at times.

The inflorescence is a narrow panicle which is greenish yellow to purple when new and ages to bright golden yellow.

The grass is susceptible to yellow oat grass mosaic virus (YOgMV), a virus of genus Tritimovirus.

== Toxicity ==
This grass is noted for being toxic to livestock, causing calcinosis, the deposition of calcium in soft tissues including muscle and tendons, the heart and large arteries including the aorta. Cattle suffer difficulty in moving and standing and reduced milk production. Goats suffer heart murmurs and arrhythmias, weight loss, difficulty in walking, kneeling, and rising, and reduced milk production. Horses suffer tenderness in tendons and ligaments, weight loss, and problems with movement.
