= Avellinia =

Scientific classification
- Kingdom: Plantae
- Clade: Tracheophytes
- Clade: Angiosperms
- Clade: Monocots
- Clade: Commelinids
- Order: Poales
- Family: Poaceae
- Subfamily: Pooideae
- Supertribe: Poodae
- Tribe: Poeae
- Subtribe: Aveninae
- Genus: Avellinia; Doll & Asch.
- Species: A. festucoides

Binomial name
- Avellinia festucoides (Link) Valdés & H.Scholz

Synonyms
- Bromus festucoides Link; Rostraria festucoides (Link) Romero Zarco; Bromus michelii Savi; Koeleria macilenta DC.; Avena puberula Guss.; Koeleria tenuiflora Salzm. ex Trin.; Trisetum macilentum (DC.) Trin.; Trisetum puberulum (Guss.) Ten.; Vulpia michelii (Savi) Rchb.; Avena macilenta (DC.) Guss.; Festuca michelii (Savi) Kunth; Avellinia michelii (Savi) Parl.; Avellinia savii Parl.; Vulpia tenuicula Boiss. & Reut.; Avena michelii (Savi) Guss.; Koeleria tenuicula (Boiss. & Reut.) Boiss. & Reut.; Koeleria michelii (Savi) Coss.; Trisetum michelii (Savi) Guss.; Avellinia tenuicula (Boiss. & Reut.) Nyman; Avellinia warionis Sennen & Mauricio; Trisetum faurei Sennen & Mauricio; Trisetum viciosorum Sennen & Mauricio; Trisetaria michelii (Savi) D.Heller

Genus of grasses

Avellinia is a genus of Mediterranean plants in the grass family. The only known species is Avellinia festucoides, found throughout much of the Mediterranean Region from Portugal and Morocco to Turkey. It is also reportedly naturalized in Australia.

The type species is Avellinia michelii (Savi) Parl.
