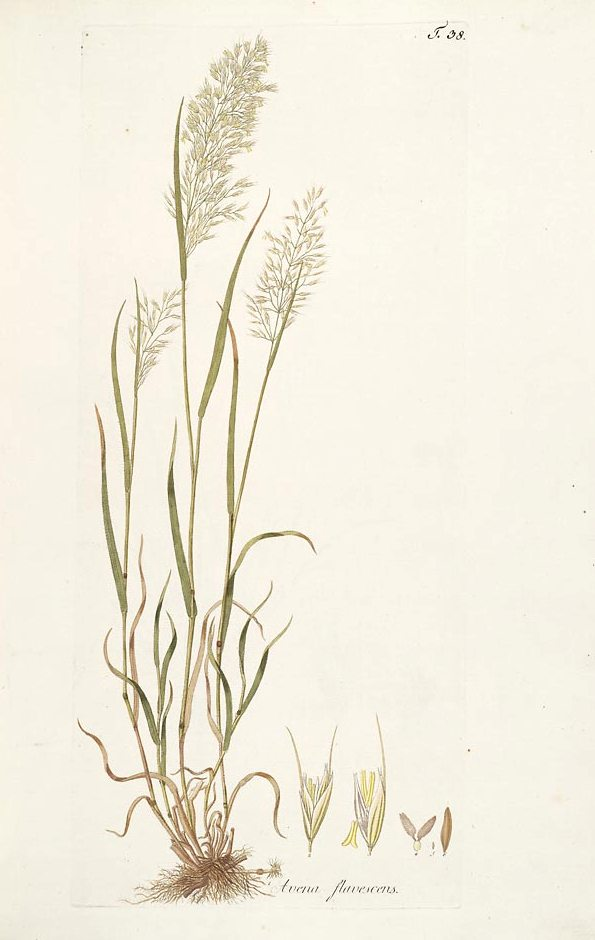
- Trisetum flavescens

Scientific classification
- Kingdom: Plantae
- Clade: Tracheophytes
- Clade: Angiosperms
- Clade: Monocots
- Clade: Commelinids
- Order: Poales
- Family: Poaceae
- Subfamily: Pooideae
- Supertribe: Poodae
- Tribe: Poeae
- Subtribe: Aveninae
- Genus: Trisetum; Pers. 1805 not (Besser ex Schult. & Schult.f.) Trin. 1830

Type species
- Trisetum flavescens (L.) P. Beauv.

Species
- See list of Trisetum species

Synonyms
- Rupestrina Prov.; Trisetarium Poir.

= Trisetum =

Genus of grasses

Trisetum is a genus of plants in the grass family, widespread in temperate, subarctic, and alpine habitats in much of the world. Oatgrass is a common name for plants in this genus.

== Species ==
Trisetum formerly included over 70 species. Over the past decade the genus has been split into smaller genera (including Graciliotrisetum and Sibirotrisetum) and some species placed in other genera. Plants of the World Online currently accepts eight species.

- Trisetum bertolonii Jonsell – Italy (Apennines)
- Trisetum caudulatum Trin. – Juan Fernández Islands, Chile, and southern Argentina
- Trisetum clarkei (Hook.f.) R.R.Stewart – Afghanistan, Himalayas, Xinjiang, and western and central China
- Trisetum debile Chrtek – China (northwestern Yunnan)
- Trisetum flavescens (L.) P.Beauv. – Europe, Azores, northwestern Africa, and western Asia
- Trisetum glomeratum (Kunth) Trin. ex Steud. – Hawaiian Islands
- Trisetum macbridei Hitchc. – central Peru
- Trisetum yunnanense Chrtek – China (Yunnan)

The List of Trisetum species includes species accepted as of 2012.
