= List of Paravilla species =

This is a list of species in the genus Paravilla.

== Paravilla species ==
- Paravilla acutula Hall, 1981
- Paravilla albata Hall, 1981
- Paravilla albicera Hall, 1981
- Paravilla apicola (Cole, 1952)
- Paravilla aridula Hall, 1981
- Paravilla borea Hall, 1981
- Paravilla californica Hall, 1981
- Paravilla castanea (Jaennicke, 1867)
- Paravilla cinerea (Cole, 1923)
- Paravilla consul (Osten Sacken, 1886)
- Paravilla cunicula (Osten Sacken, 1886)
- Paravilla deserta Hall, 1981
- Paravilla diagonalis (Loew, 1869)
- Paravilla edititoides (Painter, 1933)
- Paravilla eminens Hall, 1981
- Paravilla emulata (Painter, 1962)
- Paravilla epheba (Osten Sacken, 1886)
- Paravilla eurhinata (Bigot, 1892)
- Paravilla extremitis (Coquillett, 1902)
- Paravilla flavipilosa (Cole, 1923)
- Paravilla floridensis Hall, 1981
- Paravilla fulvicoma (Coquillett, 1887)
- Paravilla fumida (Coquillett, 1887)
- Paravilla fumosa Hall, 1981
- Paravilla hulli Hall, 1981
- Paravilla imitans Hall, 1981
- Paravilla inatra Hall, 1981
- Paravilla lacunaris (Coquillett, 1892)
- Paravilla leucothoa (Wiedemann, 1830)
- Paravilla lucida Hall, 1981
- Paravilla macneilli Hall, 1981
- Paravilla mercedis (Coquillett, 1887)
- Paravilla mexicana Hall, 1981
- Paravilla montivaga Hall, 1981
- Paravilla nigriventris Hall, 1981
- Paravilla nigrofemorata Hall, 1981
- Paravilla nigronasica (Painter, 1933)
- Paravilla opaca Hall, 1981
- Paravilla painterorum Hall, 1981
- Paravilla palliata (Loew, 1869)
- Paravilla pallida Hall, 1981
- Paravilla parasitica Hall, 1981
- Paravilla parvula Hall, 1981
- Paravilla perplexa (Coquillett, 1887)
- Paravilla separata (Walker, 1852)
- Paravilla spaldingi (Painter, 1933)
- Paravilla splendida Hall, 1981
- Paravilla syrtis (Coquillett, 1887)
- Paravilla texana Hall, 1981
- Paravilla tricellula (Cole, 1952)
- Paravilla vigilans (Coquillett, 1887)
- Paravilla winburni Hall, 1981
- Paravilla xanthina (Painter, 1933)
