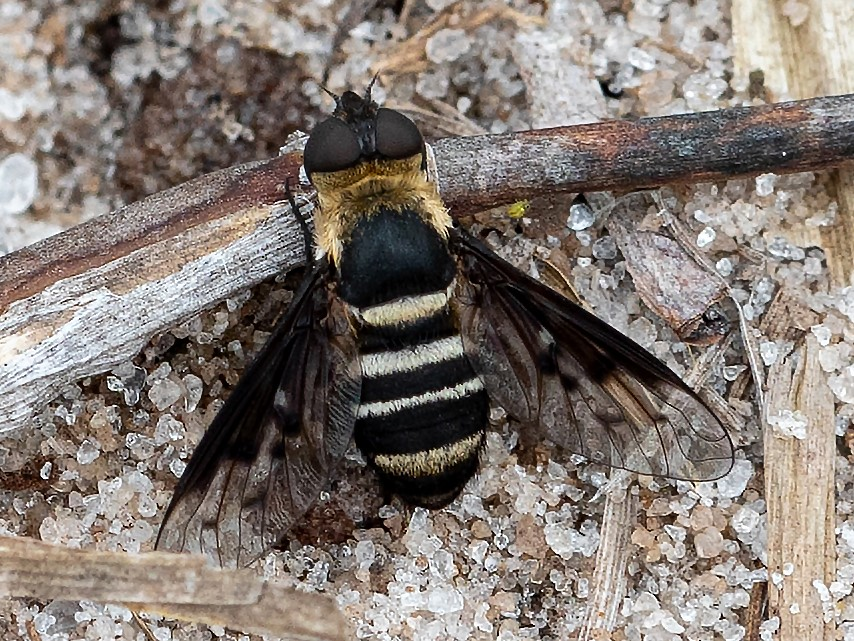

Scientific classification
- Kingdom: Animalia
- Phylum: Arthropoda
- Class: Insecta
- Order: Diptera
- Family: Bombyliidae
- Subfamily: Anthracinae
- Tribe: Villini
- Genus: Chrysanthrax
- Species: C. dispar

Binomial name
- Chrysanthrax dispar (Coquillett, 1897)

Synonyms
- Anthrax dispar Coquillett, 1892

= Chrysanthrax dispar =

Species of fly

Chrysanthrax dispar is a species of bee fly in the family Bombyliidae. It is found in Ontario, Canada, through the eastern United States as far west as Nebraska, south to Mexico.
