= Chrysanthrax crocinus =

Scientific classification
- Kingdom: Animalia
- Phylum: Arthropoda
- Class: Insecta
- Order: Diptera
- Family: Bombyliidae
- Subfamily: Anthracinae
- Tribe: Villini
- Genus: Chrysanthrax
- Species: C. crocinus

Binomial name
- Chrysanthrax crocinus (Coquillett, 1892)

Synonyms
- Anthrax crocinus Coquillett, 1892

Species of fly

Chrysanthrax crocinus is a species of bee fly in the family Bombyliidae. It is found in the southwestern United States and Baja California Norte.
