= Chrysanthrax arizonensis =

Scientific classification
- Kingdom: Animalia
- Phylum: Arthropoda
- Class: Insecta
- Order: Diptera
- Family: Bombyliidae
- Subfamily: Anthracinae
- Tribe: Villini
- Genus: Chrysanthrax
- Species: C. arizonensis

Binomial name
- Chrysanthrax arizonensis (Coquillett, 1897)

Synonyms
- Anthrax arizonensis Coquillett, 1892

Species of fly

Chrysanthrax arizonensis is a species of bee fly in the family Bombyliidae. It is found in Arizona and Nevada.
