= Chrysanthrax vanus =

Scientific classification
- Kingdom: Animalia
- Phylum: Arthropoda
- Class: Insecta
- Order: Diptera
- Family: Bombyliidae
- Subfamily: Anthracinae
- Tribe: Villini
- Genus: Chrysanthrax
- Species: C. vanus

Binomial name
- Chrysanthrax vanus (Coquillett, 1897)

Synonyms
- Anthrax vanus Coquillett, 1892

Species of fly

Chrysanthrax vanus is a species of bee fly in the family Bombyliidae. It is found from British Columbia, Canada, south through the western United States to Mexico.
