= Chrysanthrax arenosus =

Scientific classification
- Kingdom: Animalia
- Phylum: Arthropoda
- Class: Insecta
- Order: Diptera
- Family: Bombyliidae
- Subfamily: Anthracinae
- Tribe: Villini
- Genus: Chrysanthrax
- Species: C. arenosus

Binomial name
- Chrysanthrax arenosus (Coquillett, 1892)

Synonyms
- Anthrax arenosa Coquillett, 1892

Species of fly

Chrysanthrax arenosus is a species of bee fly in the family Bombyliidae. It is found in Mexico and New Mexico.
