= Rhynchanthrax parvicornis =

Scientific classification
- Domain: Eukaryota
- Kingdom: Animalia
- Phylum: Arthropoda
- Class: Insecta
- Order: Diptera
- Family: Bombyliidae
- Tribe: Villini
- Genus: Rhynchanthrax
- Species: R. parvicornis

Binomial name
- Rhynchanthrax parvicornis (Loew, 1869)

Synonyms
- Anthrax parvicornis Loew, 1869

Species of fly

Rhynchanthrax parvicornis is a species of bee flies (insects in the family Bombyliidae). It is found in the central United States from New Mexico to Alabama, north to Iowa.
