= Paravilla splendida =

Scientific classification
- Domain: Eukaryota
- Kingdom: Animalia
- Phylum: Arthropoda
- Class: Insecta
- Order: Diptera
- Family: Bombyliidae
- Tribe: Villini
- Genus: Paravilla
- Species: P. splendida

Binomial name
- Paravilla splendida Hall, 1981

Species of fly

Paravilla splendida is a species of bee fly in the family Bombyliidae. It is found in California and Baja California Norte.
