= Paravilla separata =

Scientific classification
- Kingdom: Animalia
- Phylum: Arthropoda
- Class: Insecta
- Order: Diptera
- Family: Bombyliidae
- Tribe: Villini
- Genus: Paravilla
- Species: P. separata

Binomial name
- Paravilla separata (Walker, 1852)

Synonyms
- Anthrax nemakagonensis Graenicher, 1910; Anthrax separata Walker, 1852

Species of fly

Paravilla separata is a species of bee fly in the family Bombyliidae. It is found in eastern North America, from Manitoba to Quebec in Canada, south through much of the United States, and into Mexico.
