= Stonyx clelia =

Scientific classification
- Domain: Eukaryota
- Kingdom: Animalia
- Phylum: Arthropoda
- Class: Insecta
- Order: Diptera
- Family: Bombyliidae
- Tribe: Villini
- Genus: Stonyx
- Species: S. clelia

Binomial name
- Stonyx clelia Osten Sacken, 1886

Synonyms
- Anthrax keenii Coquillett, 1887

Species of fly

Stonyx clelia is a species of bee fly in the family Bombyliidae. It is known from Mexico and Arizona.
