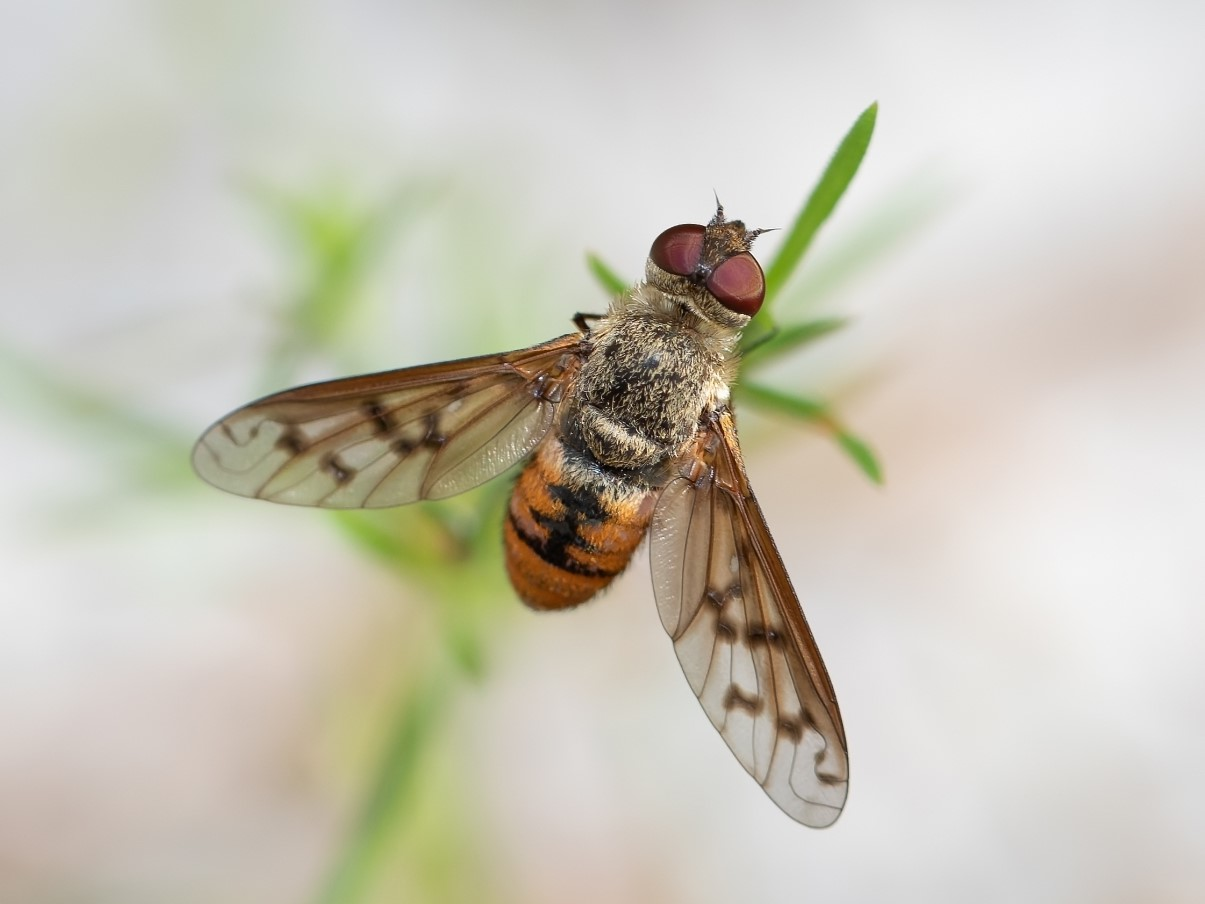

Scientific classification
- Domain: Eukaryota
- Kingdom: Animalia
- Phylum: Arthropoda
- Class: Insecta
- Order: Diptera
- Family: Bombyliidae
- Tribe: Villini
- Genus: Neodiplocampta
- Species: N. miranda

Binomial name
- Neodiplocampta miranda Hull & Martin, 1974

= Neodiplocampta miranda =

Species of fly

Neodiplocampta miranda is a species of bee fly in the family Bombyliidae. It is found in the southern United States from Florida to California, and south through Mexico into Nicaragua.
