= Eudorus =

Eudorus may refer to:

- Eudoros, second of Achilles' five commanders at Troy in Greek mythology
- Eudorus of Alexandria (1st century BC), Middle Platonist philosopher
- Chrysanthrax eudorus, species of bee fly
- Eudorus (beetle), genus in the beetle family Eucnemidae (and note Euporus)

== See also ==
- Eudoxus (disambiguation)
- Eusorus, father of several figures in Greek mythology
