= Aphoebantus borealis =

Scientific classification
- Domain: Eukaryota
- Kingdom: Animalia
- Phylum: Arthropoda
- Class: Insecta
- Order: Diptera
- Family: Bombyliidae
- Tribe: Aphoebantini
- Genus: Aphoebantus
- Species: A. borealis

Binomial name
- Aphoebantus borealis Cole & Lovett, 1921

Species of fly

Aphoebantus borealis is a species of bee flies in the family Bombyliidae.
