= Aphoebantus leucospilus =

Scientific classification
- Domain: Eukaryota
- Kingdom: Animalia
- Phylum: Arthropoda
- Class: Insecta
- Order: Diptera
- Family: Bombyliidae
- Tribe: Aphoebantini
- Genus: Aphoebantus
- Species: A. leucospilus

Binomial name
- Aphoebantus leucospilus Tabet & Hall, 1987

Species of fly

Aphoebantus leucospilus is a species of bee flies in the family Bombyliidae.
