= Aphoebantus desertus =

Scientific classification
- Domain: Eukaryota
- Kingdom: Animalia
- Phylum: Arthropoda
- Class: Insecta
- Order: Diptera
- Family: Bombyliidae
- Tribe: Aphoebantini
- Genus: Aphoebantus
- Species: A. desertus

Binomial name
- Aphoebantus desertus Coquillett, 1891

Species of fly

Aphoebantus desertus is a species of bee flies in the family Bombyliidae.
