= Paravilla tricellula =

Scientific classification
- Domain: Eukaryota
- Kingdom: Animalia
- Phylum: Arthropoda
- Class: Insecta
- Order: Diptera
- Family: Bombyliidae
- Tribe: Villini
- Genus: Paravilla
- Species: P. tricellula

Binomial name
- Paravilla tricellula (Cole, 1952)

Synonyms
- Villa tricellula Cole, 1952

Species of fly

Paravilla tricellula is a species of bee fly in the family Bombyliidae. It is found in California.
