= Lepidanthrax eremicus =

Scientific classification
- Domain: Eukaryota
- Kingdom: Animalia
- Phylum: Arthropoda
- Class: Insecta
- Order: Diptera
- Family: Bombyliidae
- Tribe: Villini
- Genus: Lepidanthrax
- Species: L. eremicus

Binomial name
- Lepidanthrax eremicus Hall, 1976

Species of fly

Lepidanthrax eremicus is a species of bee fly in the family Bombyliidae. It is known from California.
