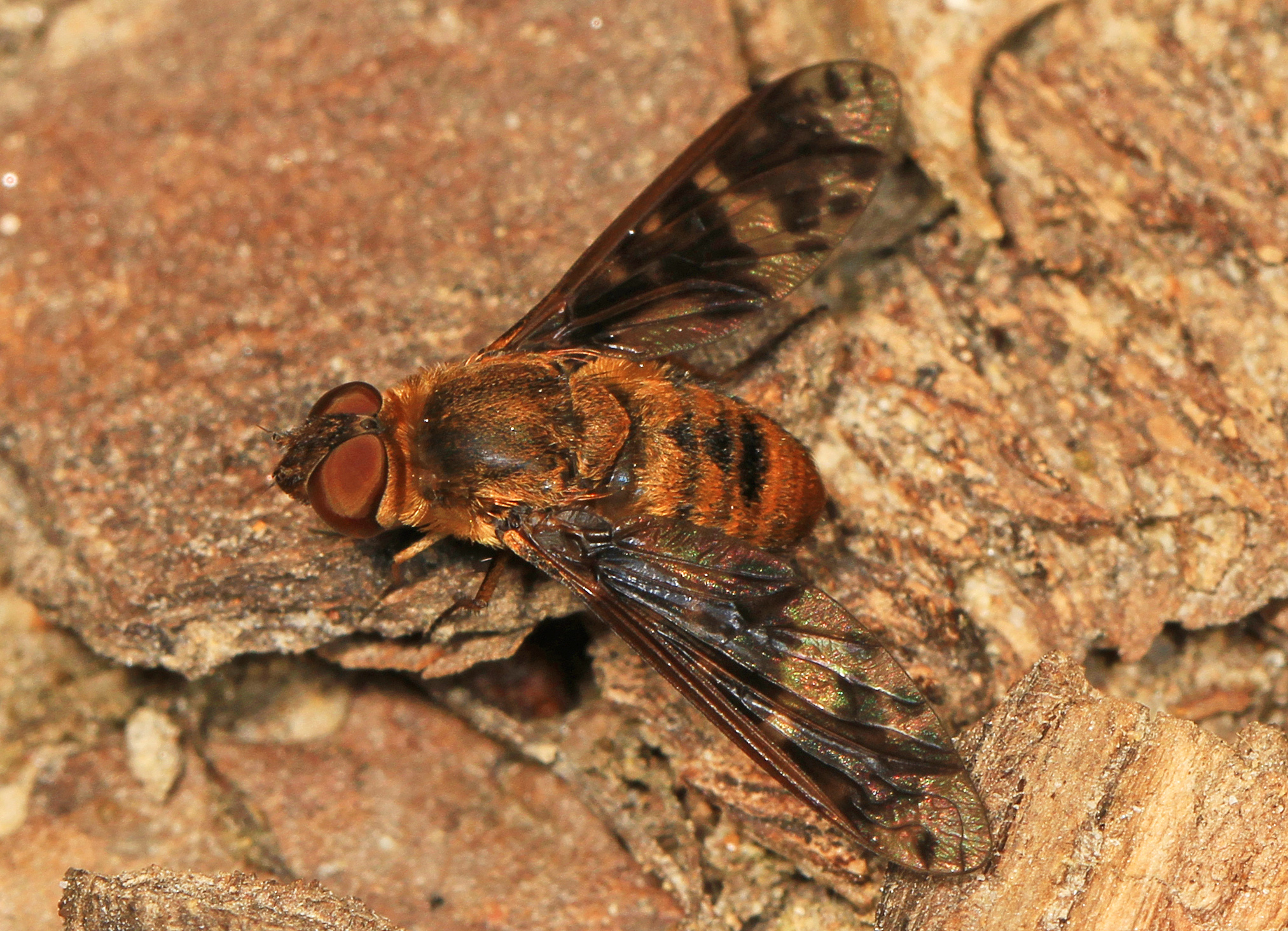

Scientific classification
- Kingdom: Animalia
- Phylum: Arthropoda
- Clade: Pancrustacea
- Class: Insecta
- Order: Diptera
- Family: Bombyliidae
- Tribe: Villini
- Genus: Dipalta
- Species: D. banksi

Binomial name
- Dipalta banksi Johnson, 1921

= Dipalta banksi =

Species of fly

Dipalta banksi, the Huron shore bee fly, is a species of bee fly in the family Bombyliidae.

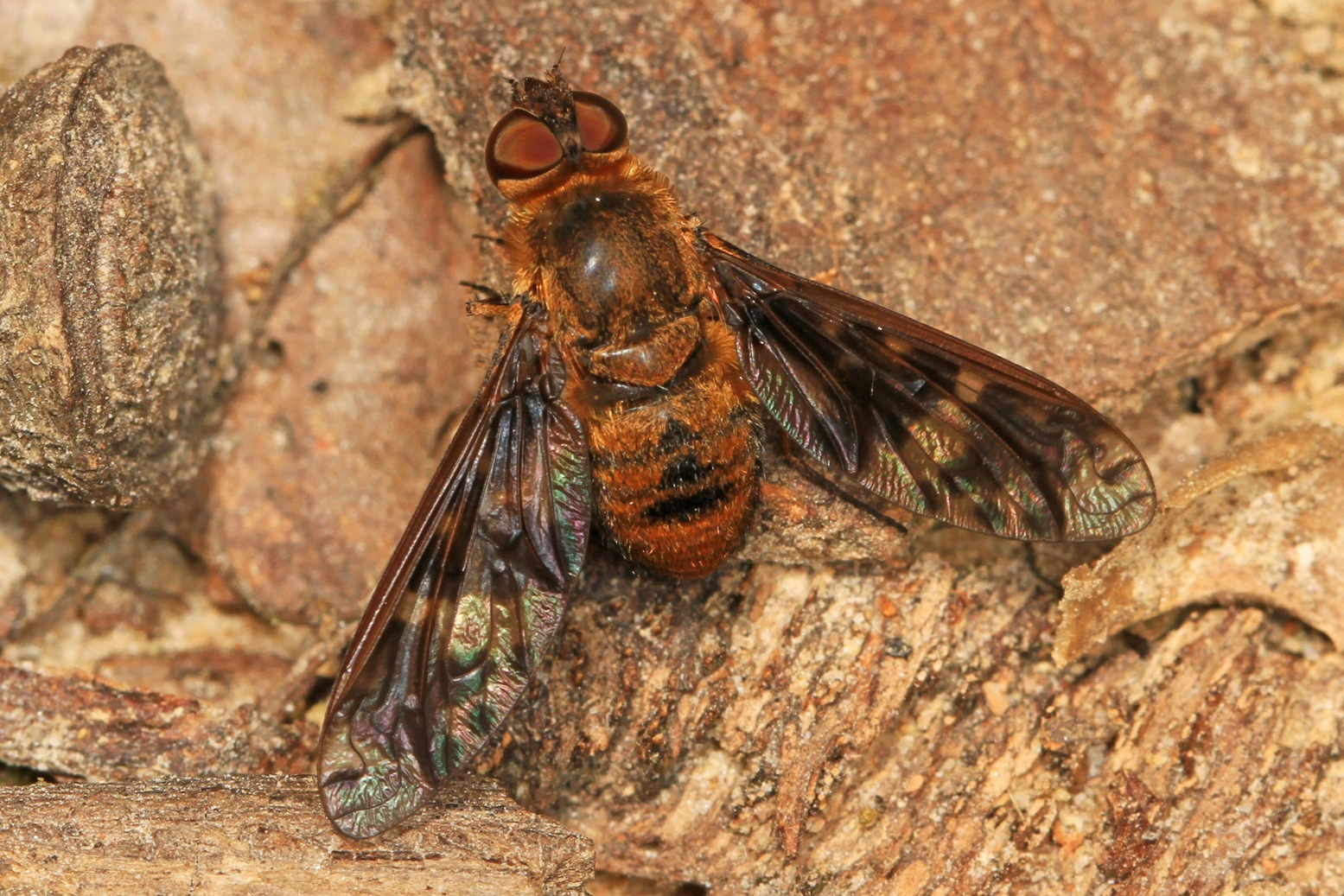
Huron shore bee fly, Dipalta banksi

It is found in eastern Canada and the northeastern United States in sand dune habitats.
