= Neodiplocampta mirella =

Scientific classification
- Domain: Eukaryota
- Kingdom: Animalia
- Phylum: Arthropoda
- Class: Insecta
- Order: Diptera
- Family: Bombyliidae
- Tribe: Villini
- Genus: Neodiplocampta
- Species: N. mirella

Binomial name
- Neodiplocampta mirella Hull & Martin, 1974

Species of fly

Neodiplocampta mirella is a species of bee fly in the family Bombyliidae. It is known from California.
