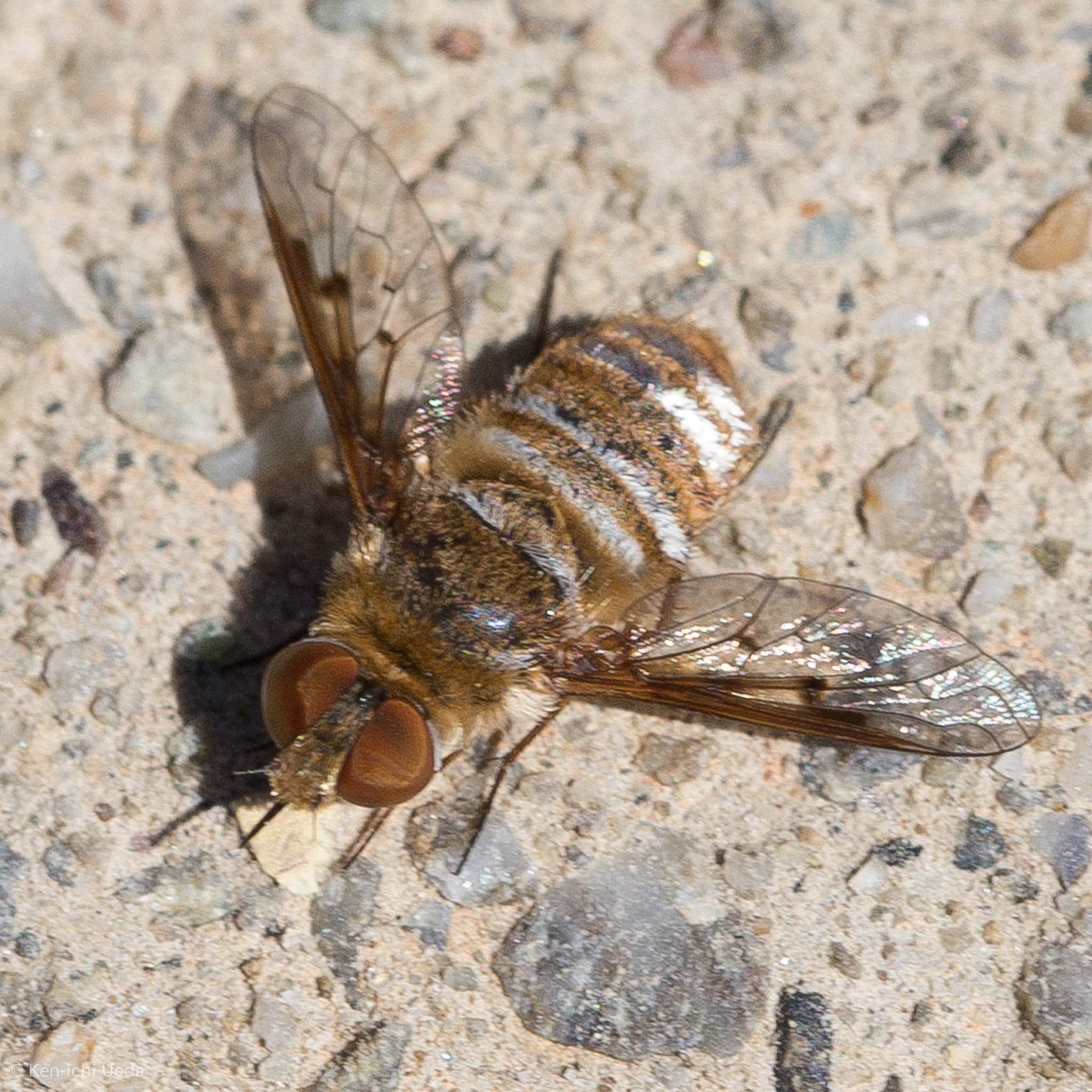

Scientific classification
- Kingdom: Animalia
- Phylum: Arthropoda
- Clade: Pancrustacea
- Class: Insecta
- Order: Diptera
- Family: Bombyliidae
- Tribe: Villini
- Genus: Lepidanthrax
- Species: L. arnaudi

Binomial name
- Lepidanthrax arnaudi Hall, 1976

= Lepidanthrax arnaudi =

Species of fly

Lepidanthrax arnaudi is a species of bee fly in the family Bombyliidae. It is found in the western US state of California.
