= Lepidanthrax linsdalei =

Scientific classification
- Domain: Eukaryota
- Kingdom: Animalia
- Phylum: Arthropoda
- Class: Insecta
- Order: Diptera
- Family: Bombyliidae
- Tribe: Villini
- Genus: Lepidanthrax
- Species: L. linsdalei

Binomial name
- Lepidanthrax linsdalei Hall, 1976

Species of fly

Lepidanthrax linsdalei is a species of bee fly in the family Bombyliidae. It is known from California and Idaho.
