= Aphoebantus mus =

Scientific classification
- Domain: Eukaryota
- Kingdom: Animalia
- Phylum: Arthropoda
- Class: Insecta
- Order: Diptera
- Family: Bombyliidae
- Tribe: Aphoebantini
- Genus: Aphoebantus
- Species: A. mus

Binomial name
- Aphoebantus mus (Osten Sacken, 1877)

Synonyms
- Triodites mus Osten Sacken, 1877

Species of fly

Aphoebantus mus is a species of bee flies in the family Bombyliidae.
