= Paravilla edititoides =

Scientific classification
- Domain: Eukaryota
- Kingdom: Animalia
- Phylum: Arthropoda
- Class: Insecta
- Order: Diptera
- Family: Bombyliidae
- Tribe: Villini
- Genus: Paravilla
- Species: P. edititoides

Binomial name
- Paravilla edititoides (Painter, 1933)

Synonyms
- Villa edititoides Painter, 1933

Species of fly

Paravilla edititoides is a species of bee fly in the family Bombyliidae. It is found in central North America in Saskatchewan, Canada, through the United States from Arizona to Oklahoma, and into Mexico.
