= Astrophanes andinus =

Scientific classification
- Kingdom: Animalia
- Phylum: Arthropoda
- Class: Insecta
- Order: Diptera
- Family: Bombyliidae
- Tribe: Villini
- Genus: Astrophanes
- Species: A. andinus

Binomial name
- Astrophanes andinus Brèthes, 1909

Species of fly

Astrophanes andinus is a species of bee flies (insects in the family Bombyliidae).

== Distribution ==
Argentina.
