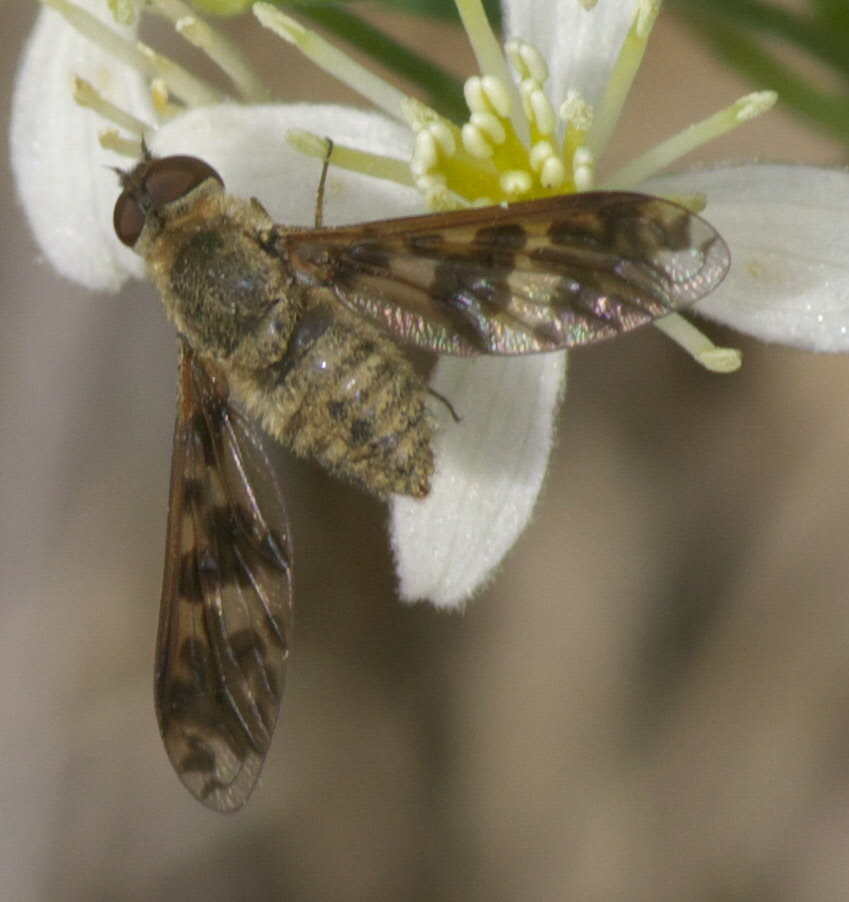

Scientific classification
- Domain: Eukaryota
- Kingdom: Animalia
- Phylum: Arthropoda
- Class: Insecta
- Order: Diptera
- Family: Bombyliidae
- Tribe: Villini
- Genus: Dipalta
- Species: D. serpentina

Binomial name
- Dipalta serpentina Osten Sacken, 1877

= Dipalta serpentina =

Species of fly

Dipalta serpentina is a species of bee fly in the family Bombyliidae. It is widespread in North America from British Columbia, Canada south and east through most of the United States to Florida, Mexico, Cuba, Guatemala, and Honduras. It is a parasitoid of antlion species such as Myrmeleon immaculatus.
