= Astrophanes adonis =

Scientific classification
- Kingdom: Animalia
- Phylum: Arthropoda
- Class: Insecta
- Order: Diptera
- Family: Bombyliidae
- Tribe: Villini
- Genus: Astrophanes
- Species: A. adonis

Binomial name
- Astrophanes adonis Osten-Sacken, 1886

Species of fly

Astrophanes adonis is a species of bee fly in the family Bombyliidae. It is found in western North America from British Columbia, Canada south to Mexico, and as far east as Kansas in the United States.
