= Aphoebantus transitus =

Scientific classification
- Domain: Eukaryota
- Kingdom: Animalia
- Phylum: Arthropoda
- Class: Insecta
- Order: Diptera
- Family: Bombyliidae
- Tribe: Aphoebantini
- Genus: Aphoebantus
- Species: A. transitus

Binomial name
- Aphoebantus transitus (Coquillett, 1886)

Synonyms
- Leptochilus transitus Coquillett, 1886

Species of fly

Aphoebantus transitus is a species of bee flies in the family Bombyliidae.
