= Neodiplocampta astrella =

Scientific classification
- Domain: Eukaryota
- Kingdom: Animalia
- Phylum: Arthropoda
- Class: Insecta
- Order: Diptera
- Family: Bombyliidae
- Tribe: Villini
- Genus: Neodiplocampta
- Species: N. astrella

Binomial name
- Neodiplocampta astrella Hull & Martin, 1974

Species of fly

Neodiplocampta astrella is a species of bee fly in the family Bombyliidae. It is found in Mexico and Arizona.
