= Paravilla cinerea =

Scientific classification
- Domain: Eukaryota
- Kingdom: Animalia
- Phylum: Arthropoda
- Class: Insecta
- Order: Diptera
- Family: Bombyliidae
- Tribe: Villini
- Genus: Paravilla
- Species: P. cinerea

Binomial name
- Paravilla cinerea (Cole, 1923)

Synonyms
- Villa cinerea Cole, 1923

Species of fly

Paravilla cinerea is a species of bee fly in the family Bombyliidae. It is found in Arizona and Baja California Norte.
