= Paravilla montivaga =

Scientific classification
- Domain: Eukaryota
- Kingdom: Animalia
- Phylum: Arthropoda
- Class: Insecta
- Order: Diptera
- Family: Bombyliidae
- Tribe: Villini
- Genus: Paravilla
- Species: P. montivaga

Binomial name
- Paravilla montivaga Hall, 1981

Species of fly

Paravilla montivaga is a species of bee fly in the family Bombyliidae. It is found in western North America from British Columbia, Canada, south through the United States as far east as Colorado, and into Mexico.
