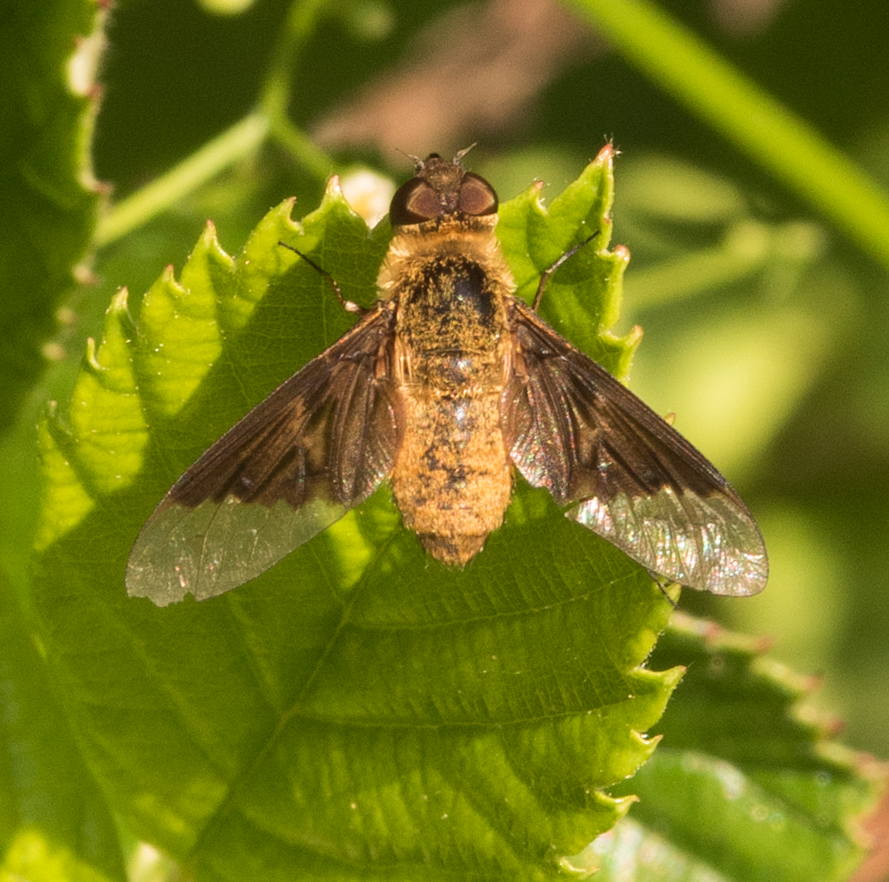

Scientific classification
- Kingdom: Animalia
- Phylum: Arthropoda
- Class: Insecta
- Order: Diptera
- Family: Bombyliidae
- Subfamily: Anthracinae
- Tribe: Villini
- Genus: Chrysanthrax
- Species: C. cypris

Binomial name
- Chrysanthrax cypris (Meigen, 1820)

Synonyms
- Anthrax cypris Meigen, 1820; Anthrax fulvohirta Wiedemann, 1821; Anthrax conifacies Macquart, 1850

= Chrysanthrax cypris =

Species of fly

Chrysanthrax cypris is a species of bee fly in the family Bombyliidae. It is found in the eastern United States from Massachusetts and Iowa south to Mexico. It is a parasitoid of tiphiid wasps.
