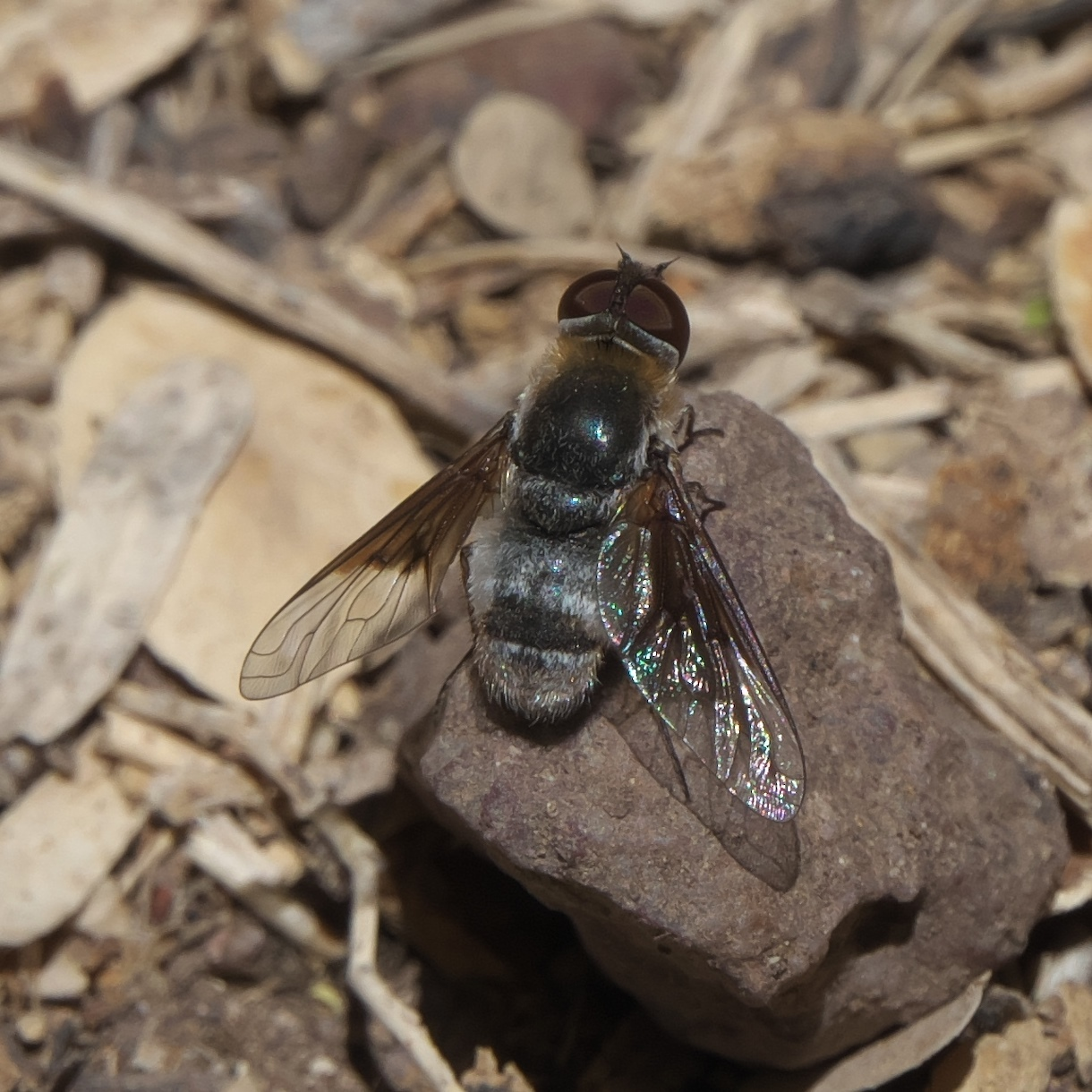
- Paravilla cunicula, Arizona

Scientific classification
- Domain: Eukaryota
- Kingdom: Animalia
- Phylum: Arthropoda
- Class: Insecta
- Order: Diptera
- Family: Bombyliidae
- Tribe: Villini
- Genus: Paravilla
- Species: P. cunicula

Binomial name
- Paravilla cunicula (Osten Sacken, 1886)

Synonyms
- Anthrax cunicula Osten Sacken, 1886

= Paravilla cunicula =

Species of fly

Paravilla cunicula is a species of bee fly in the family Bombyliidae. It is found in the southwestern United States and northwestern Mexico.
