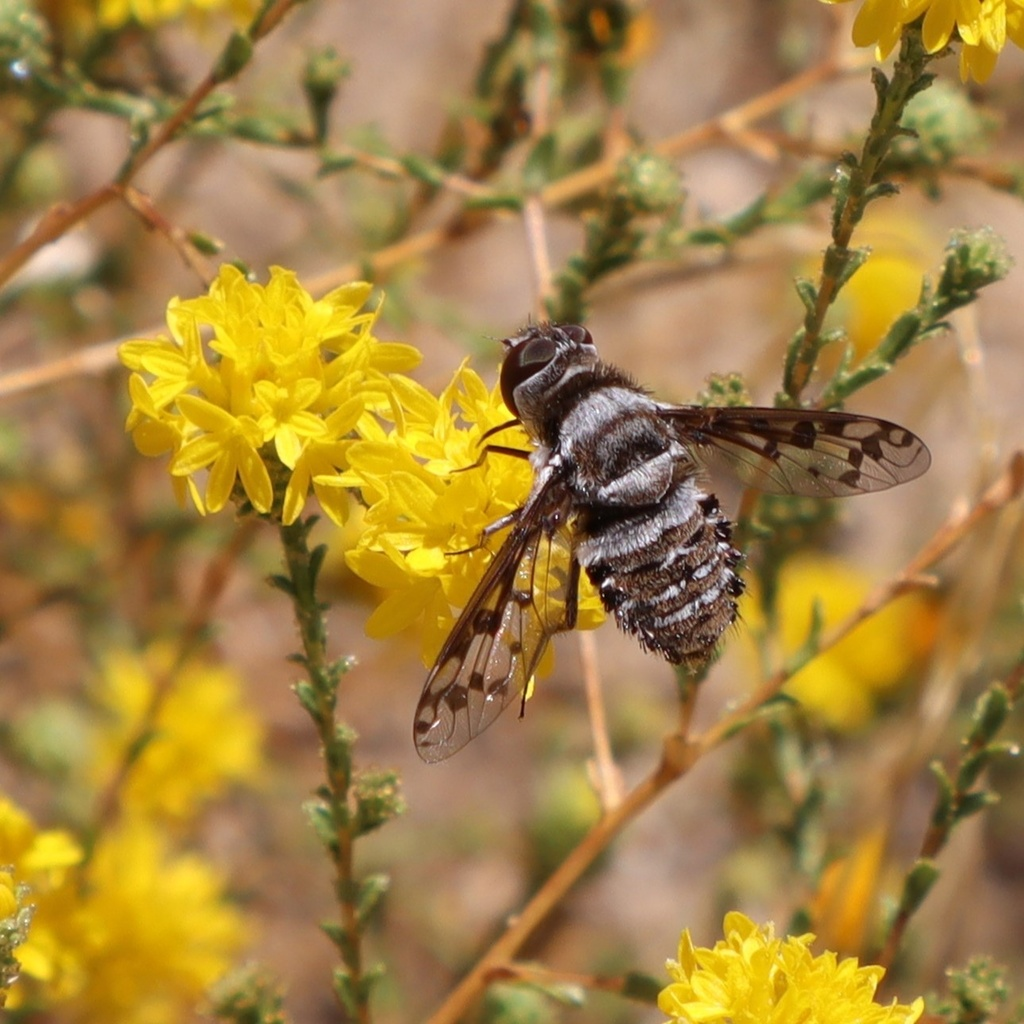

Scientific classification
- Domain: Eukaryota
- Kingdom: Animalia
- Phylum: Arthropoda
- Class: Insecta
- Order: Diptera
- Family: Bombyliidae
- Tribe: Villini
- Genus: Lepidanthrax
- Species: L. californicus

Binomial name
- Lepidanthrax californicus Hall, 1976

= Lepidanthrax californicus =

Species of fly

Lepidanthrax californicus is a species of bee fly in the family Bombyliidae. It is known from California, Arizona, and Baja California Norte.
