= Lepidanthrax angulus =

Scientific classification
- Domain: Eukaryota
- Kingdom: Animalia
- Phylum: Arthropoda
- Class: Insecta
- Order: Diptera
- Family: Bombyliidae
- Tribe: Villini
- Genus: Lepidanthrax
- Species: L. angulus

Binomial name
- Lepidanthrax angulus Osten-Sacken, 1886

Species of fly

Lepidanthrax angulus is a species of bee fly in the family Bombyliidae. It is found in Mexico and the southwestern United States.
