= Lepidanthrax disjunctus =

Scientific classification
- Domain: Eukaryota
- Kingdom: Animalia
- Phylum: Arthropoda
- Class: Insecta
- Order: Diptera
- Family: Bombyliidae
- Tribe: Villini
- Genus: Lepidanthrax
- Species: L. disjunctus

Binomial name
- Lepidanthrax disjunctus (Wiedemann, 1830)

Synonyms
- Anthrax disjunctus Wiedemann, 1830

Species of fly

Lepidanthrax disjunctus is a species of bee fly in the family Bombyliidae. It is known from Mexico and Arizona.
