= Lepidanthrax rauchi =

Scientific classification
- Domain: Eukaryota
- Kingdom: Animalia
- Phylum: Arthropoda
- Class: Insecta
- Order: Diptera
- Family: Bombyliidae
- Tribe: Villini
- Genus: Lepidanthrax
- Species: L. rauchi

Binomial name
- Lepidanthrax rauchi Hall, 1976

Species of fly

Lepidanthrax rauchi is a species of bee fly in the family Bombyliidae. It is found in Mexico and Arizona.
