= Chrysanthrax lepidotoides =

Scientific classification
- Domain: Eukaryota
- Kingdom: Animalia
- Phylum: Arthropoda
- Class: Insecta
- Order: Diptera
- Family: Bombyliidae
- Tribe: Villini
- Genus: Chrysanthrax
- Species: C. lepidotoides

Binomial name
- Chrysanthrax lepidotoides (Johnson, 1919)

Synonyms
- Villa lepidotoides Johnson, 1919

Species of fly

Chrysanthrax lepidotoides is a species of bee fly in the family Bombyliidae. It is known only from New Jersey.
