= Paravilla californica =

Scientific classification
- Domain: Eukaryota
- Kingdom: Animalia
- Phylum: Arthropoda
- Class: Insecta
- Order: Diptera
- Family: Bombyliidae
- Tribe: Villini
- Genus: Paravilla
- Species: P. californica

Binomial name
- Paravilla californica Hall, 1981

Species of fly

Paravilla californica is a species of bee fly in the family Bombyliidae. It is found in the southwestern United States and northwestern Mexico.
