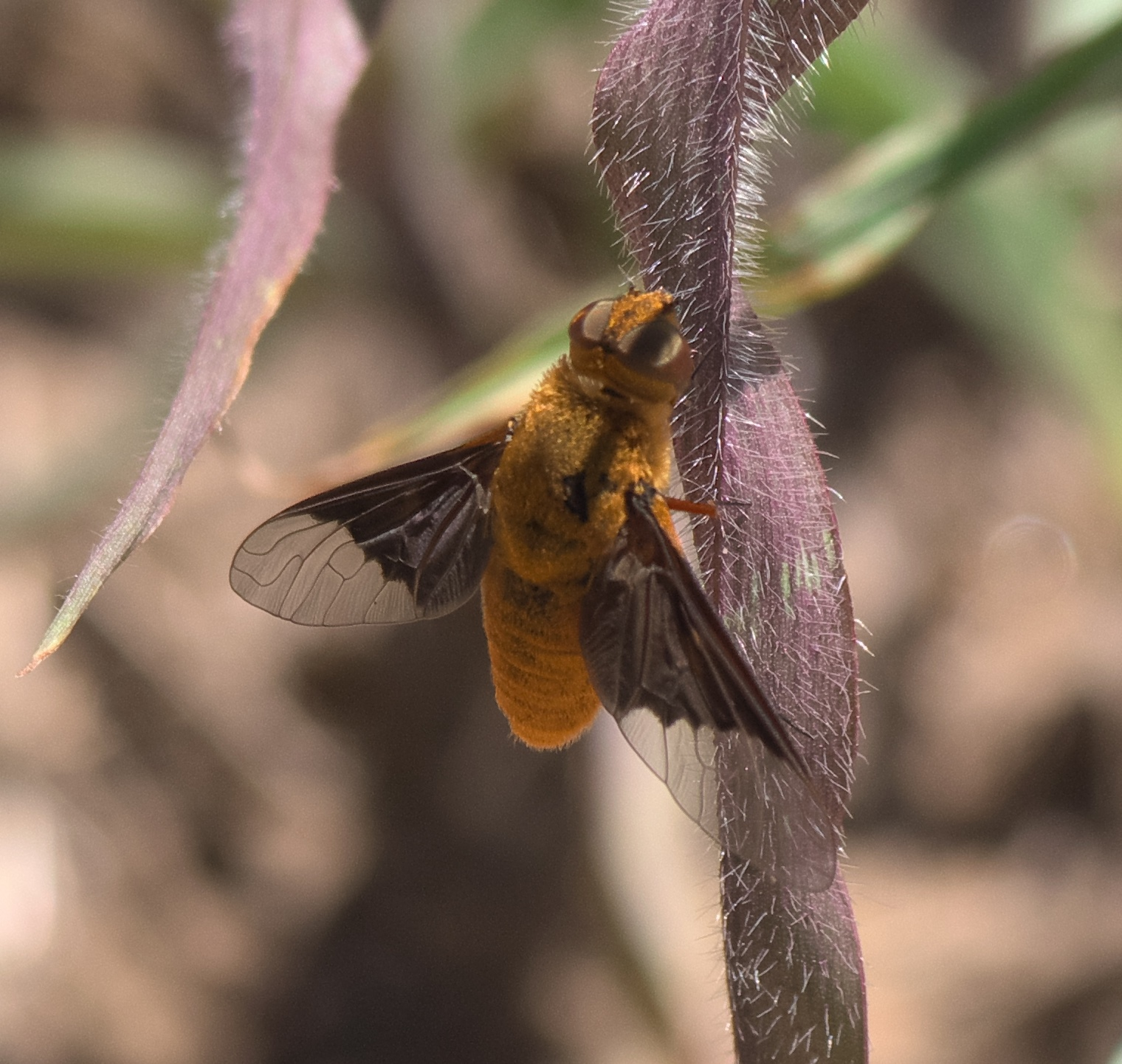
- Chrysanthrax cypris

Scientific classification
- Kingdom: Animalia
- Phylum: Arthropoda
- Class: Insecta
- Order: Diptera
- Family: Bombyliidae
- Subfamily: Anthracinae
- Tribe: Villini
- Genus: Chrysanthrax; Osten-Sacken, 1886

= Chrysanthrax =

Genus of flies

Chrysanthrax is a genus of bee flies in the family Bombyliidae, found in North and South America.

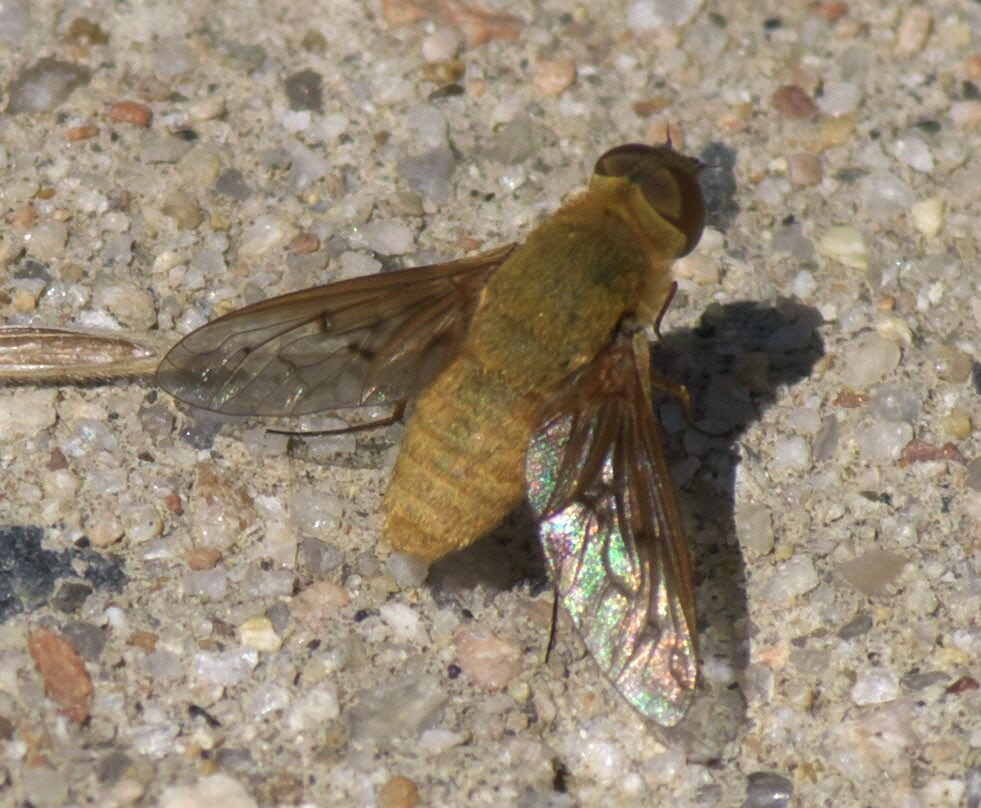
Chrysanthrax edititius

== Species ==
- Chrysanthrax adumbrata (Coquillett, 1887)
- Chrysanthrax albicomus Tabet & Hall, 1987
- Chrysanthrax altus (Tucker, 1907)
- Chrysanthrax anna (Coquillett, 1887)
- Chrysanthrax arenarius (Hall, 1976)
- Chrysanthrax arenosus (Coquillett, 1892)
- Chrysanthrax argentosus (Painter, 1933
- Chrysanthrax arizonensis (Coquillett, 1887)
- Chrysanthrax astarte (Wiedemann, 1830)
- Chrysanthrax caliginosus Evenhuis & Greathead, 1999
- Chrysanthrax cautor (Coquillett, 1887)
- Chrysanthrax cerius (Williston, 1901)
- Chrysanthrax cinefactus (Coquillett, 1892)
- Chrysanthrax compressus (Painter, 1926)
- Chrysanthrax conclusa (Walker, 1857)
- Chrysanthrax crocinus (Coquillett, 1892)
- Chrysanthrax cypris (Meigen, 1820)
- Chrysanthrax dichotomus (Schiner, 1868)
- Chrysanthrax dimidiata (Wiedemann, 1819)
- Chrysanthrax dispar (Coquillett, 1887)
- Chrysanthrax edititius (Say, 1829)
- Chrysanthrax eudorus (Coquillett, 1887)
- Chrysanthrax hircinus (Coquillett, 1892)
- Chrysanthrax ioptera (Wiedemann, 1828)
- Chrysanthrax juncturus (Coquillett, 1887)
- Chrysanthrax lepidotoides (Johnson, 1919)
- Chrysanthrax leviculus (Coquillett, 1894)
- Chrysanthrax melasoma (Wulp, 1882)
- Chrysanthrax meridionalis (Cole, 1923)
- Chrysanthrax multicolor (Bigot, 1892)
- Chrysanthrax nivea Cole, 1923
- Chrysanthrax pallidulus (Coquillett, 1894)
- Chrysanthrax panamensis Evenhuis & Greathead, 1999
- Chrysanthrax partita Tabet & Hall, 1987
- Chrysanthrax pennyi Evenhuis, 2017
- Chrysanthrax petalonyx Tabet & Hall, 1987
- Chrysanthrax primitivus (Walker, 1849)
- Chrysanthrax procedens (Walker, 1852)
- Chrysanthrax quadripunctata Cole, 1923
- Chrysanthrax restitutus (Walker, 1852)
- Chrysanthrax sackeniana (Williston, 1901)
- Chrysanthrax scitulus (Coquillett, 1887)
- Chrysanthrax semilugens (Philippi, 1865)
- Chrysanthrax subandinus (Philippi, 1865)
- Chrysanthrax tantillus (Coquillett, 1892)
- Chrysanthrax telluris (Coquillett, 1892)
- Chrysanthrax turbatus (Coquillett, 1887)
- Chrysanthrax unicincta (Bigot, 1892)
- Chrysanthrax vanus (Coquillett, 1887)
- Chrysanthrax variatus (Coquillett, 1892)
- Chrysanthrax vastus (Coquillett, 1892)
- Chrysanthrax vulpinus (Coquillett, 1892)
- Chrysanthrax yaqui (Painter, 1962)
