= Astrophanes =

Scientific classification
- Kingdom: Animalia
- Phylum: Arthropoda
- Class: Insecta
- Order: Diptera
- Family: Bombyliidae
- Subfamily: Anthracinae
- Tribe: Villini
- Genus: Astrophanes; Osten-Sacken, 1886

Genus of flies

Astrophanes is a genus of bee flies in the family Bombyliidae. There are two described species in the genus.

== Species ==
- Astrophanes adonis Osten Sacken, 1886
- Astrophanes andinus Brèthes, 1909
