= Desmatoneura =

Scientific classification
- Domain: Eukaryota
- Kingdom: Animalia
- Phylum: Arthropoda
- Class: Insecta
- Order: Diptera
- Family: Bombyliidae
- Subfamily: Anthracinae
- Tribe: Xeramoebini
- Genus: Desmatoneura; Williston, 1895

Genus of flies

Desmatoneura is a genus of bee flies in the family Bombyliidae. There are about 18 described species in Desmatoneura.

== Species ==
These 18 species belong to the genus Desmatoneura:

- Desmatoneura aegypticola (Paramonov, 1935)^{c g}
- Desmatoneura albifacies (Macquart, 1840)^{c g}
- Desmatoneura argentifrons Williston, 1895^{i c g b}
- Desmatoneura brevipennis (Bezzi, 1924)^{c g}
- Desmatoneura choreutes (Bowden, 1964)^{c g}
- Desmatoneura davidi Zaitzev, 1997^{c g}
- Desmatoneura erythrostoma (Rondani, 1873)^{c g}
- Desmatoneura flavifrons (Becker, 1915)^{c g}
- Desmatoneura frontalis (Wiedemann, 1828)^{c g}
- Desmatoneura kinereti Zaitzev, 1999^{c g}
- Desmatoneura meridionalis (Hesse, 1956)^{c g}
- Desmatoneura nivea (Rossi, 1790)^{c g}
- Desmatoneura niveisquamis (Brunetti, 1909)^{c g}
- Desmatoneura sarawaka Evenhuis, 1982^{c g}
- Desmatoneura sardoa (Macquart, 1849)^{c g}
- Desmatoneura sica Greathead, 1969^{c g}
- Desmatoneura stackelbergi Zaitzev, 1999^{c g}
- Desmatoneura turkmenica Zaitzev, 2002^{c g}

Data sources: i = ITIS, c = Catalogue of Life, g = GBIF, b = Bugguide.net
