= Paravilla mercedis =

Scientific classification
- Domain: Eukaryota
- Kingdom: Animalia
- Phylum: Arthropoda
- Class: Insecta
- Order: Diptera
- Family: Bombyliidae
- Genus: Paravilla
- Species: P. mercedis

Binomial name
- Paravilla mercedis (Coquillett, 1887)

Synonyms
- Anthrax mercedis Coquillett, 1887

Species of fly

Paravilla mercedis is a species of bee fly in the family Bombyliidae. It is found in the southwestern United States and northwestern Mexico.
