= Rhynchanthrax capreus =

Scientific classification
- Domain: Eukaryota
- Kingdom: Animalia
- Phylum: Arthropoda
- Class: Insecta
- Order: Diptera
- Family: Bombyliidae
- Genus: Rhynchanthrax
- Species: R. capreus

Binomial name
- Rhynchanthrax capreus (Coquillett, 1887)

Synonyms
- Anthrax caprea Coquillett, 1887

Species of fly

Rhynchanthrax capreus is a species of bee fly in the family Bombyliidae. It is found in Mexico and the southwestern United States from California to Nebraska.
