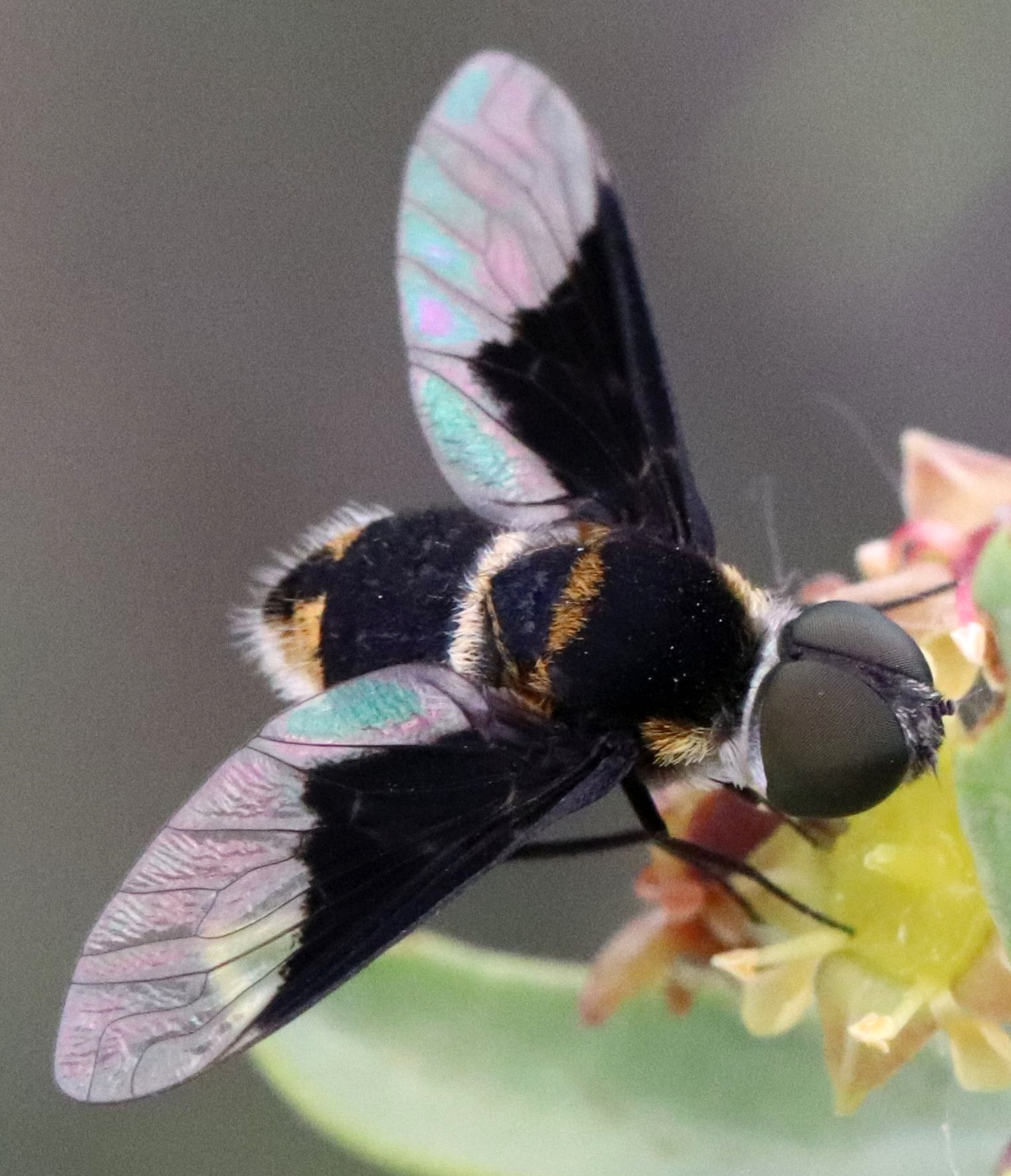
- Ins curta

Scientific classification
- Kingdom: Animalia
- Phylum: Arthropoda
- Class: Insecta
- Order: Diptera
- Family: Bombyliidae
- Subfamily: Anthracinae
- Tribe: Villini
- Genus: Ins; Evenhuis, 2020

Type species
- Anthrax ignea Macquart, 1846

= Ins (fly) =

Genus of flies

Ins is a genus of flies belonging to the family Bombyliidae (bee-flies), with 10 described species, distributed throughout the Nearctic and Neotropics. These species were formerly placed in the genus Hemipenthes, but recognized as a separate lineage in 2020.

== Species ==
- Ins celeris (Wiedemann, 1828) - Nearctic: Mexico, USA. Neotropical: Costa Rica, Honduras, Panama
- Ins constituta Walker, 1852 - Neotropical: South America.
- Ins curta (Loew, 1869) - Nearctic: Mexico, USA. Neotropical: Mexico (Oaxaca, Yucatán).
- Ins ignea (Macquart, 1846) - Neotropical: Colombia, Guyana, Panama.
- Ins leucocephala (Wulp, 1882) - Neotropical: Argentina.
- Ins martinorum (Painter in Painter & Painter, 1962) - Nearctic: Mexico (Michoácan de Ocampo)
- Ins minas (Macquart, 1850) - Neotropical: Argentina, Brazil (Minas Gerais).
- Ins pectorcolumbo Evenhuis, 2020 - Neotropical: El Salvador.
- Ins pleuralis (Williston, 1901) - Nearctic: Mexico (Colima, Guerrero, Morelos, Nayarit, Puebla). Neotropical: Mexico (Chiapas).
- Ins zanouts Evenhuis, 2020 - Neotropical: Costa Rica, Panama.
