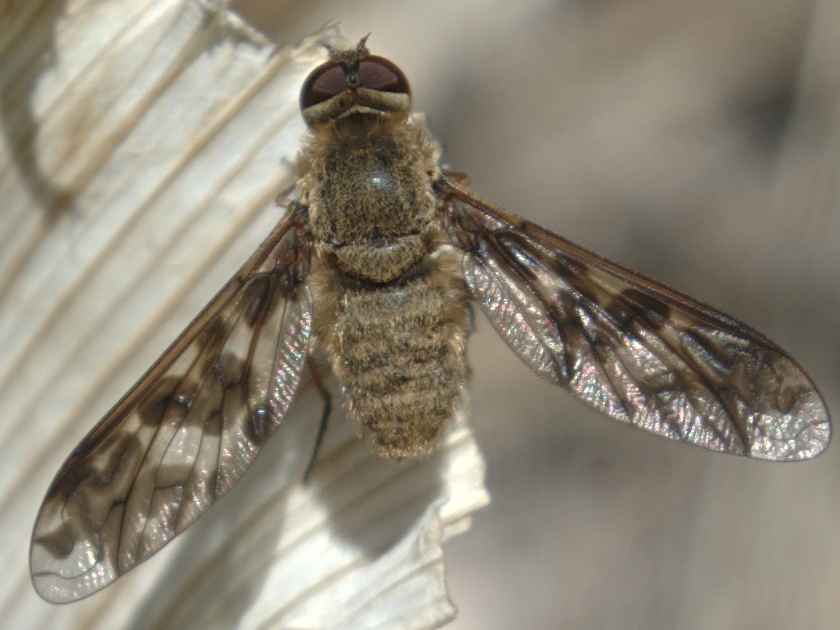
- Dipalta sp.

Scientific classification
- Kingdom: Animalia
- Phylum: Arthropoda
- Class: Insecta
- Order: Diptera
- Family: Bombyliidae
- Subfamily: Anthracinae
- Tribe: Villini
- Genus: Dipalta; Osten Sacken, 1877

Type species
- Dipalta serpentina Osten Sacken, 1877

= Dipalta =

Genus of flies

Dipalta is a North American genus of bee flies in the family Bombyliidae. There are two described species of Dipalta. The genus is closely related to Villa.

== Description ==
These medium-sized flies have conical faces, and have three marginal wing cells on mottled wings with erratic wing venation. Wing length is 10–13 mm, and body length is 9–10 mm.

== Ecology ==
Adults are found pollinating low growing flowers in desert areas. Larvae are parasitic on ant lions.

== Species ==
- D. banksi Johnson, 1921
- D. serpentina Osten Sacken, 1877
