= Paravilla deserta =

Scientific classification
- Domain: Eukaryota
- Kingdom: Animalia
- Phylum: Arthropoda
- Class: Insecta
- Order: Diptera
- Family: Bombyliidae
- Genus: Paravilla
- Species: P. deserta

Binomial name
- Paravilla deserta Hall, 1981

Species of fly

Paravilla deserta is a species of bee fly in the family Bombyliidae. It is found in the western United States from Montana to California and south into Mexico.
