= Paravilla syrtis =

Scientific classification
- Kingdom: Animalia
- Phylum: Arthropoda
- Class: Insecta
- Order: Diptera
- Family: Bombyliidae
- Genus: Paravilla
- Species: P. syrtis

Binomial name
- Paravilla syrtis (Coquillett, 1887)

Synonyms
- Anthrax syrtis Coquillett, 1887

Species of fly

Paravilla syrtis is a species of bee fly in the family Bombyliidae. It is widespread in the arid regions of western North America, from the Yukon in Canada south through the United States and into Mexico.
