= Rhynchanthrax =

Scientific classification
- Domain: Eukaryota
- Kingdom: Animalia
- Phylum: Arthropoda
- Class: Insecta
- Order: Diptera
- Family: Bombyliidae
- Subfamily: Anthracinae
- Tribe: Villini
- Genus: Rhynchanthrax; Painter, 1933

Genus of flies

Rhynchanthrax is a North American genus of bee flies in the family Bombyliidae. There are seven described species in Rhynchanthrax.

== Species ==
These seven species belong to the genus Rhynchanthrax:

- Rhynchanthrax capreus (Coquillett, 1887)^{i c g b}
- Rhynchanthrax maria (Williston, 1901)^{i c}
- Rhynchanthrax nigrofimbriata (Williston, 1901)^{i c}
- Rhynchanthrax parvicornis (Loew, 1869)^{i c g b}
- Rhynchanthrax quivera (Painter, 1933)^{i}
- Rhynchanthrax rex (Osten Sacken, 1886)^{i c}
- Rhynchanthrax texanus (Painter, 1933)^{i c g}

Data sources: i = ITIS, c = Catalogue of Life, g = GBIF, b = Bugguide.net
