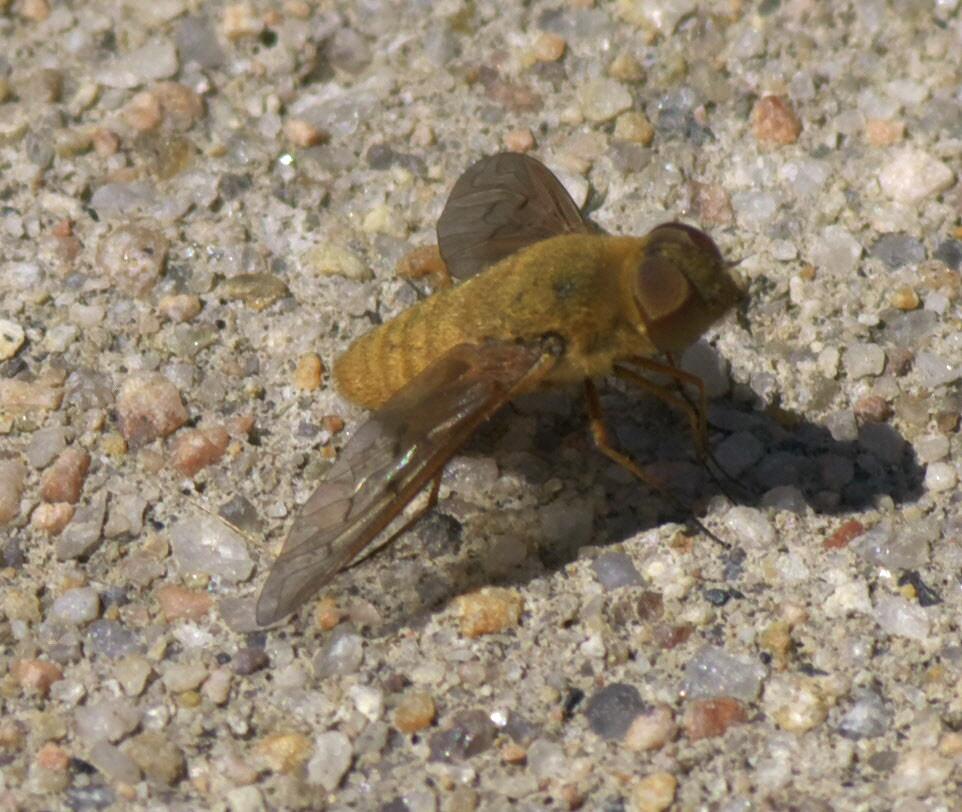

Scientific classification
- Domain: Eukaryota
- Kingdom: Animalia
- Phylum: Arthropoda
- Class: Insecta
- Order: Diptera
- Family: Bombyliidae
- Genus: Chrysanthrax
- Species: C. edititius

Binomial name
- Chrysanthrax edititius (Say, 1829)

Synonyms
- Anthrax edititia Say, 1829; Anthrax impiger Coquillett, 1887

= Chrysanthrax edititius =

Species of fly

Chrysanthrax edititius is a species of bee fly in the family Bombyliidae. It is widespread in the United States from Oregon to Michigan, south through Mexico to Guatemala and Honduras.

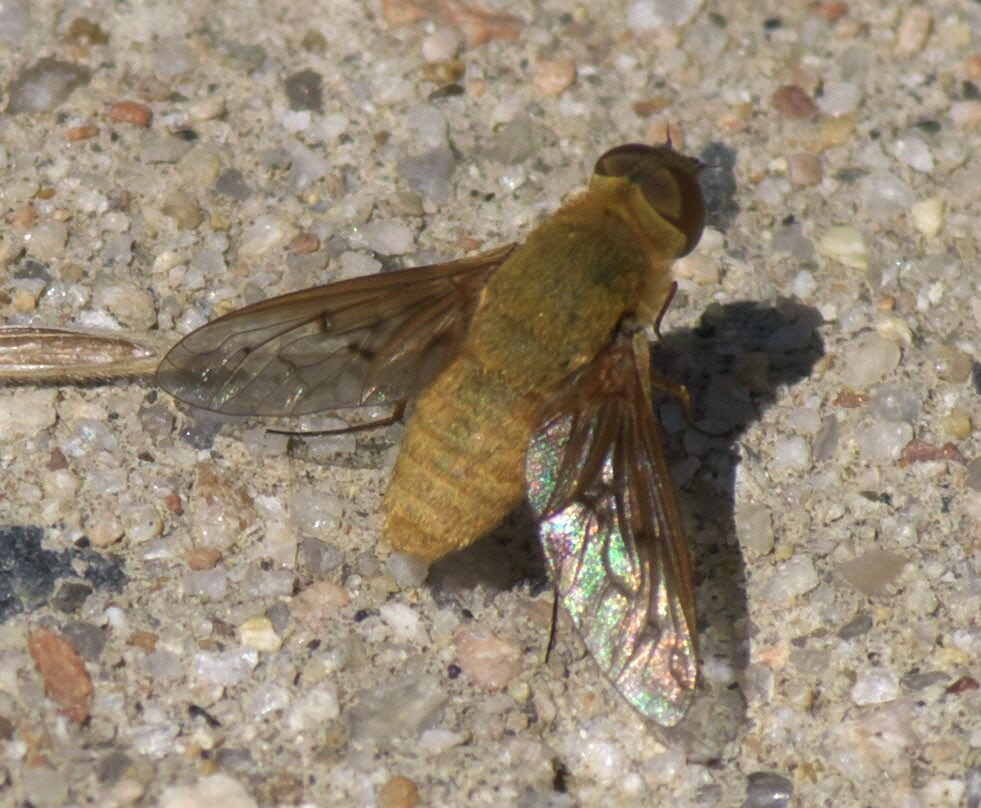
