= Aphoebantus fumosus =

Scientific classification
- Domain: Eukaryota
- Kingdom: Animalia
- Phylum: Arthropoda
- Class: Insecta
- Order: Diptera
- Family: Bombyliidae
- Genus: Aphoebantus
- Species: A. fumosus

Binomial name
- Aphoebantus fumosus (Coquillett, 1892)

Synonyms
- Aphoebantus fucatus Coquillett, 1894; Epacmus fumosus Coquillett, 1892

Species of fly

Aphoebantus fumosus is a species of bee flies in the family Bombyliidae.
