= Paravilla fumida =

Scientific classification
- Domain: Eukaryota
- Kingdom: Animalia
- Phylum: Arthropoda
- Class: Insecta
- Order: Diptera
- Family: Bombyliidae
- Genus: Paravilla
- Species: P. fumida

Binomial name
- Paravilla fumida (Coquillett, 1887)

Synonyms
- Anthrax fumida Coquillett, 1887; Anthrax obscura Coquillett, 1894; Villa coquilletti Painter, 1965

Species of fly

Paravilla fumida is a species of bee fly in the family Bombyliidae. It is found in California.
