= Aphoebantus conurus =

Scientific classification
- Domain: Eukaryota
- Kingdom: Animalia
- Phylum: Arthropoda
- Class: Insecta
- Order: Diptera
- Family: Bombyliidae
- Genus: Aphoebantus
- Species: A. conurus

Binomial name
- Aphoebantus conurus Osten Sacken, 1887

Species of fly

Aphoebantus conurus is a species of bee flies in the family Bombyliidae.
