= Desmatoneura argentifrons =

Scientific classification
- Domain: Eukaryota
- Kingdom: Animalia
- Phylum: Arthropoda
- Class: Insecta
- Order: Diptera
- Family: Bombyliidae
- Tribe: Xeramoebini
- Genus: Desmatoneura
- Species: D. argentifrons

Binomial name
- Desmatoneura argentifrons Williston, 1895

Species of fly

Desmatoneura argentifrons is a species of bee flies in the family Bombyliidae.
