= Paravilla fulvicoma =

Scientific classification
- Domain: Eukaryota
- Kingdom: Animalia
- Phylum: Arthropoda
- Class: Insecta
- Order: Diptera
- Family: Bombyliidae
- Genus: Paravilla
- Species: P. fulvicoma

Binomial name
- Paravilla fulvicoma (Coquillett, 1887)

Synonyms
- Anthrax fulvicoma Coquillett, 1887

Species of fly

Paravilla fulvicoma is a species of bee fly in the family Bombyliidae. It is found in the western United States from Washington to Oklahoma, south into Mexico.
