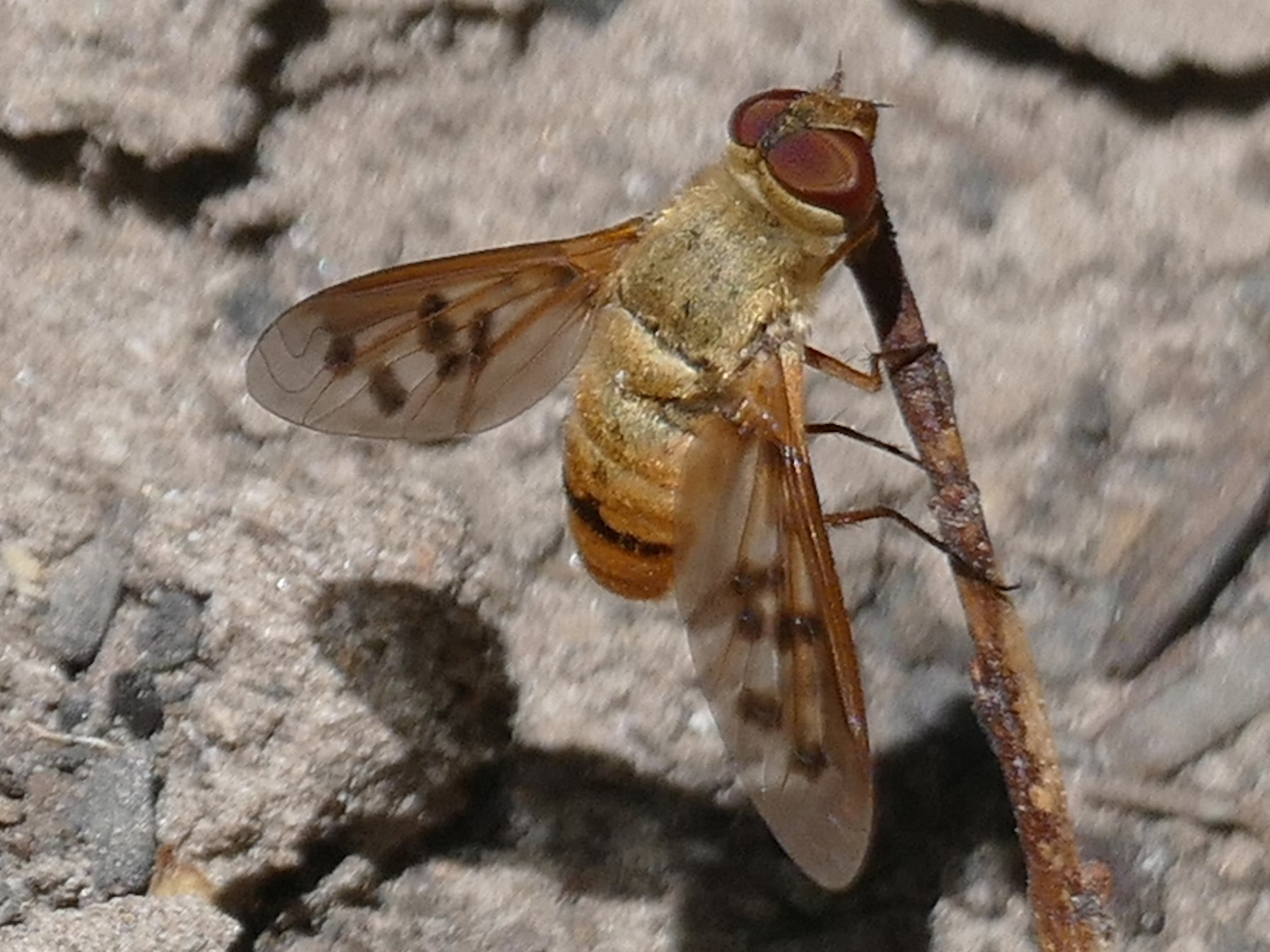
- Neodiplocampta mira
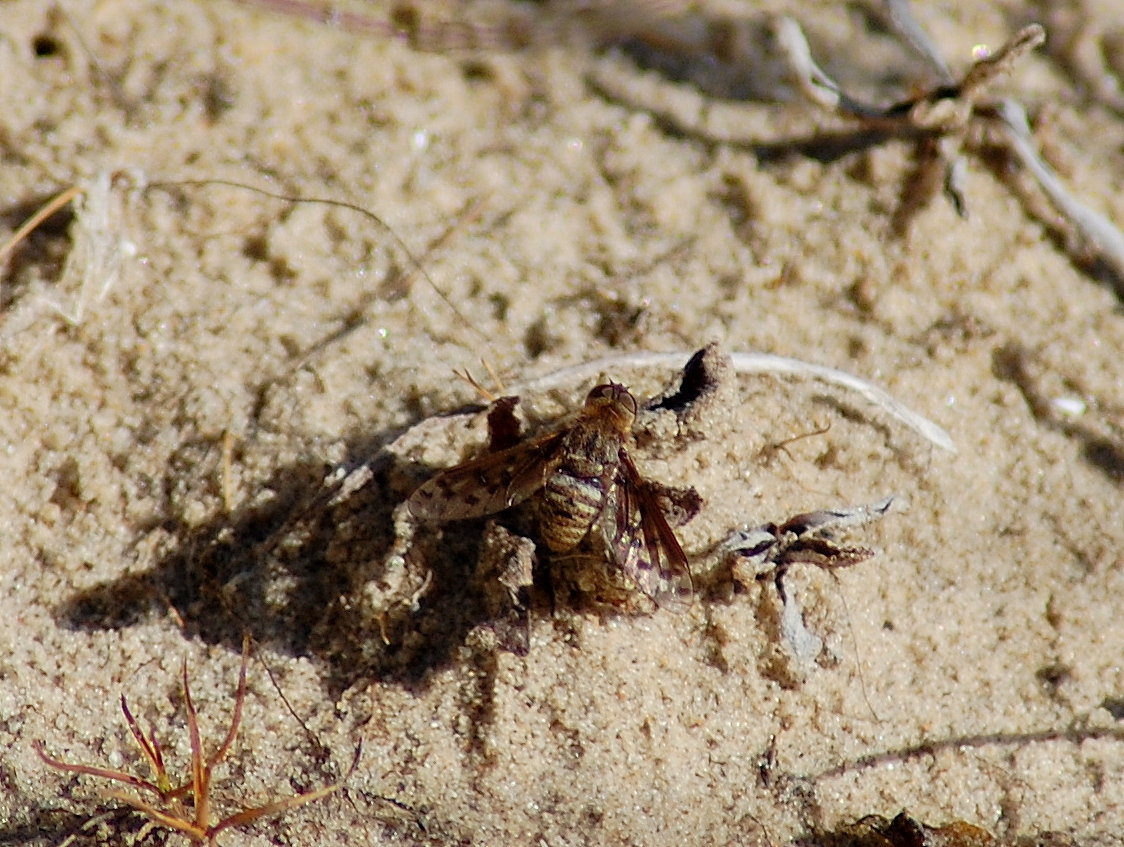
- Neodiplocampta spiloptera

Scientific classification
- Kingdom: Animalia
- Phylum: Arthropoda
- Clade: Pancrustacea
- Class: Insecta
- Order: Diptera
- Family: Bombyliidae
- Subfamily: Anthracinae
- Tribe: Villini
- Genus: Neodiplocampta; Curran, 1934

= Neodiplocampta =

Genus of flies

Neodiplocampta is a genus of bee flies that belongs to the subfamily Anthracinae. Members of this genus can be found in North America and South America.

== Species ==
These 17 described species belong to the genus Neodiplocampta. They are listed below:

- Neodiplocampta astrella Hull & Martin, 1974^{i c g b}
- Neodiplocampta brasiliana Hull & Martin, 1974^{c g}
- Neodiplocampta caliginosa Tabet and Hall, 1987^{i c g}
- Neodiplocampta decemmacula (Walker, 1857)^{c}
- Neodiplocampta garaguaya Hull & Martin, 1974^{c g}
- Neodiplocampta krombeini Hull & Martin, 1974^{c g}
- Neodiplocampta laurella Hull & Martin, 1974^{c g}
- Neodiplocampta mira Coquillett, 1887^{c g b}
- Neodiplocampta miranda Hull & Martin, 1974^{i c g b}
- Neodiplocampta mirella Hull & Martin, 1974^{i c g b}
- Neodiplocampta painteri Hull & Martin, 1974^{c g}
- Neodiplocampta paradoxa (Jaennicke, 1867)^{i c g}
- Neodiplocampta parva (Loew, 1869)^{c g}
- Neodiplocampta roederi (Curran, 1931)^{c}
- Neodiplocampta sepia Hull, 1966^{c g}
- Neodiplocampta spiloptera (Wiedemann, 1828)^{c g}

Data sources: i = ITIS, c = Catalogue of Life, g = GBIF, b = Bugguide.net
