= Aphoebantus scalaris =

Scientific classification
- Domain: Eukaryota
- Kingdom: Animalia
- Phylum: Arthropoda
- Class: Insecta
- Order: Diptera
- Family: Bombyliidae
- Genus: Aphoebantus
- Species: A. scalaris

Binomial name
- Aphoebantus scalaris Melander, 1950

Species of fly

Aphoebantus scalaris is a species in the family Bombyliidae ("bee flies"), in the order Diptera ("flies").
