= Stonyx =

Scientific classification
- Domain: Eukaryota
- Kingdom: Animalia
- Phylum: Arthropoda
- Class: Insecta
- Order: Diptera
- Family: Bombyliidae
- Subfamily: Anthracinae
- Tribe: Villini
- Genus: Stonyx; Osten-Sacken, 1886

Genus of flies

Stonyx is a genus of bee flies in the family Bombyliidae. There are five described species in the genus Stonyx.

== Species ==
These five species belong to the genus Stonyx:

- Stonyx clelia Osten Sacken, 1886^{i c g b}
- Stonyx clotho (Wiedemann, 1830)^{i c g}
- Stonyx lacera (Wiedemann, 1830)^{i c g}
- Stonyx lelia Williston, 1901^{i c g}
- Stonyx melia Williston, 1901^{i c g}

Data sources: i = ITIS, c = Catalogue of Life, g = GBIF, b = Bugguide.net
