= Mancia =

Mancia is a surname. Notable people with the surname include:

- Adrienne Mancia (1927–2022), American film curator
- Iván Mancía (born 1989), Salvadoran footballer
- Orietta Mancia (born 1968), Italian runner
- Saúl Enrique Mancía (born 1983-84), Salvadoran politician
- Titus Curtilius Mancia, Roman senator
