= Paradiplocampta =

Scientific classification
- Domain: Eukaryota
- Kingdom: Animalia
- Phylum: Arthropoda
- Class: Insecta
- Order: Diptera
- Family: Bombyliidae
- Tribe: Villini
- Genus: Paradiplocampta; Hall, 1975
- Species: P. tabeti

Binomial name
- Paradiplocampta tabeti Hall, 1975

Genus of flies

Paradiplocampta is a genus of bee flies in the family Bombyliidae. There is one described species in the genus Paradiplocampta, P. tabeti, known from California and Arizona.
