= Aphoebantus =

Scientific classification
- Domain: Eukaryota
- Kingdom: Animalia
- Phylum: Arthropoda
- Class: Insecta
- Order: Diptera
- Family: Bombyliidae
- Tribe: Aphoebantini
- Genus: Aphoebantus; Loew, 1872

Genus of flies

Aphoebantus is a genus of bee flies (insects in the family Bombyliidae). There are at least 80 described species in Aphoebantus.

== Species ==
- Aphoebantus abnormis Coquillett, 1891
- Aphoebantus albicinctus Paramonov, 1925
- Aphoebantus albopilosus Tabet and Hall, 1987
- Aphoebantus altercinctus Melander, 1950
- Aphoebantus arenicola Melander, 1950
- Aphoebantus argentifrons Cole, 1923
- Aphoebantus armeniacus Paramonov, 1925
- Aphoebantus balteatus Melander, 1950
- Aphoebantus barbatus Melander, 1950
- Aphoebantus bilineatus Tabet and Hall, 1987
- Aphoebantus bisulcus Osten Sacken, 1887
- Aphoebantus borealis Cole & Lovett, 1921
- Aphoebantus brevistylus Coquillett, 1891
- Aphoebantus capax Coquillett, 1891
- Aphoebantus carbonarius Osten Sacken, 1887
- Aphoebantus catenarius Melander, 1950
- Aphoebantus catulus Coquillett, 1894
- Aphoebantus cervinus Loew, 1872
- Aphoebantus chilensis Hall, 1976
- Aphoebantus claripennis (Becker, 1903)
- Aphoebantus concinnus (Coquillett, 1892)
- Aphoebantus contiguus Melander, 1950
- Aphoebantus conurus Osten Sacken, 1887
- Aphoebantus costalis Paramonov, 1929
- Aphoebantus cyclops Osten Sacken, 1887
- Aphoebantus dentei Andretta & Carrera, 1952
- Aphoebantus denudatus Melander, 1950
- Aphoebantus desertus Coquillett, 1891
- Aphoebantus eremicola Melander, 1950
- Aphoebantus fumidus Coquillett, 1891
- Aphoebantus fumosus (Coquillett, 1892)
- Aphoebantus gluteatus Melander, 1950
- Aphoebantus halteratus Melander, 1950
- Aphoebantus hians Melander, 1950
- Aphoebantus hirsutus Coquillett, 1886
- Aphoebantus interruptus Coquillett, 1891
- Aphoebantus inversus Melander, 1950
- Aphoebantus latifrons Paramonov, 1929
- Aphoebantus leucospilus Tabet & Hall, 1987
- Aphoebantus leviculus Coquillett, 1894
- Aphoebantus maculatus Melander, 1950
- Aphoebantus marcidus Coquillett, 1891
- Aphoebantus marginatus Cole, 1923
- Aphoebantus melanogaster (Bigot, 1892)
- Aphoebantus melanomerinyx Tabet and Hall, 1987
- Aphoebantus micropyga Melander, 1950
- Aphoebantus mixtus Coquillett, 1891
- Aphoebantus mormon Melander, 1950
- Aphoebantus mus (Osten Sacken, 1877)
- Aphoebantus nigropilosus Tabet and Hall, 1987
- Aphoebantus nitidus
- Aphoebantus obtectus Melander, 1950
- Aphoebantus oxypetes Tabet and Hall, 1987
- Aphoebantus parkeri Melander, 1950
- Aphoebantus pavidus Coquillett, 1886
- Aphoebantus pellucidus (Coquillett, 1892)
- Aphoebantus peodes Osten Sacken, 1887
- Aphoebantus persicus Becker & Stein, 1913
- Aphoebantus prodes Osten Sacken, 1887
- Aphoebantus pusillus Paramonov, 1920
- Aphoebantus rattus Osten Sacken, 1887
- Aphoebantus scalaris Melander, 1950
- Aphoebantus schlingeri Hall, 1957
- Aphoebantus scriptus Coquillett, 1891
- Aphoebantus separatus Melander, 1950
- Aphoebantus sperryorum Melander, 1950
- Aphoebantus squamosus Coquillett, 1891
- Aphoebantus subcostalis Paramonov, 1929
- Aphoebantus tarapacensis Hall, 1976
- Aphoebantus tardus Coquillett, 1891
- Aphoebantus timberlakei Melander, 1950
- Aphoebantus transcaspicus Paramonov, 1925
- Aphoebantus transitus (Coquillett, 1886)
- Aphoebantus turkmenicus Paramonov, 1929
- Aphoebantus ursula Melander, 1950
- Aphoebantus varius Coquillett, 1891
- Aphoebantus vasatus Melander, 1950
- Aphoebantus vittatus Coquillett, 1886
- Aphoebantus vulpecula Coquillett, 1894
- Aphoebantus wadensis Bezzi, 1925
- Aphoebantus xanthoscelus Tabet and Hall, 1987
