= Diochanthrax =

Scientific classification
- Domain: Eukaryota
- Kingdom: Animalia
- Phylum: Arthropoda
- Class: Insecta
- Order: Diptera
- Family: Bombyliidae
- Tribe: Villini
- Genus: Diochanthrax; Hall, 1975
- Species: D. morulus

Binomial name
- Diochanthrax morulus (Hall, 1975)

Genus of flies

Diochanthrax is a genus of bee flies in the family Bombyliidae. There is one described species in Diochanthrax, D. morulus, found in California.
