= Eucessia =

Scientific classification
- Kingdom: Animalia
- Phylum: Arthropoda
- Clade: Pancrustacea
- Class: Insecta
- Order: Diptera
- Family: Bombyliidae
- Tribe: Aphoebantini
- Genus: Eucessia; Coquillett, 1886
- Species: E. rubens

Binomial name
- Eucessia rubens Coquillett, 1886

Genus of flies

Eucessia is a genus of bee flies (insects in the family Bombyliidae). There is at least one described species in Eucessia, E. rubens.
