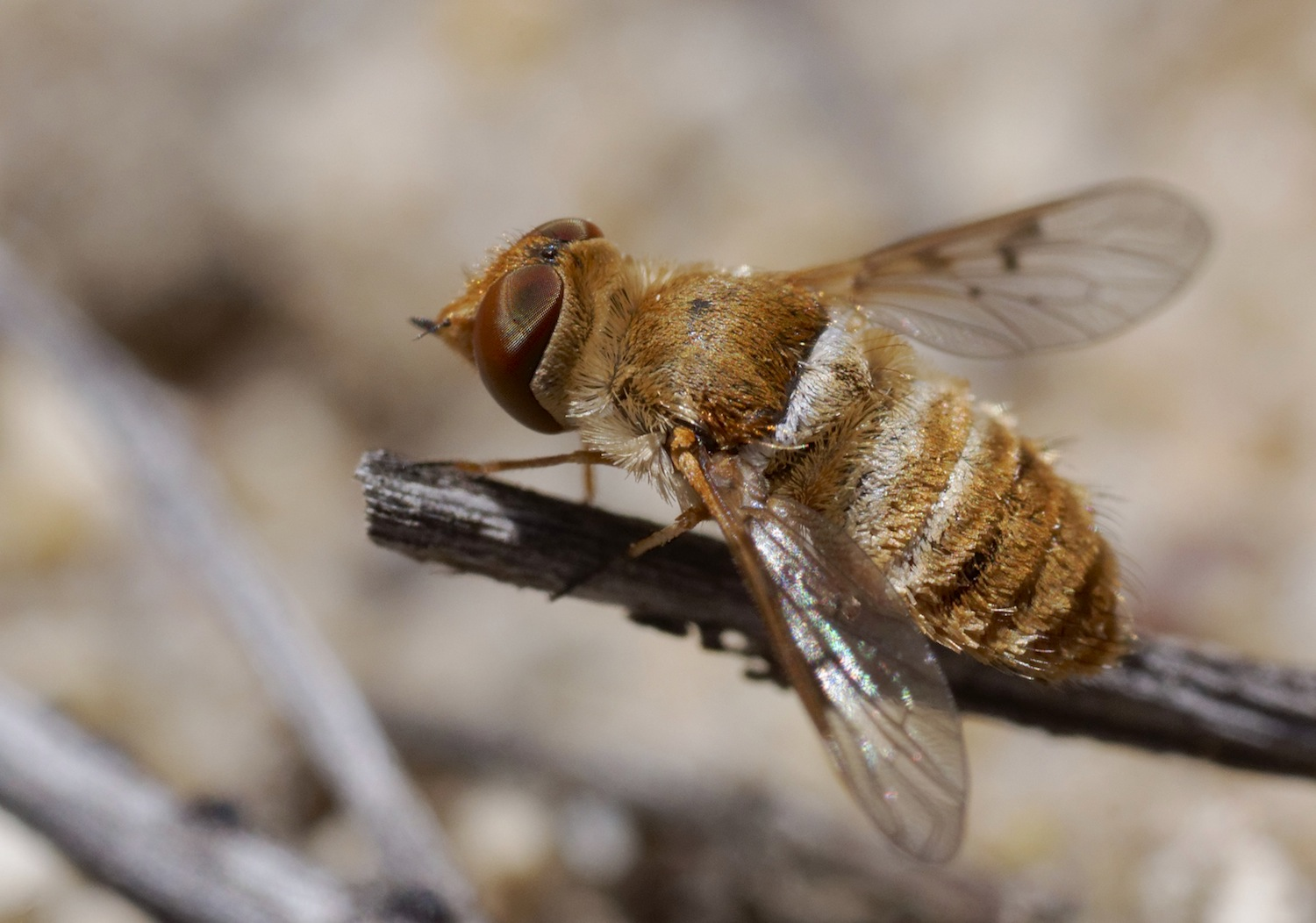

Scientific classification
- Domain: Eukaryota
- Kingdom: Animalia
- Phylum: Arthropoda
- Class: Insecta
- Order: Diptera
- Family: Bombyliidae
- Tribe: Villini
- Genus: Lepidanthrax; Osten-Sacken, 1886

Type species
- Anthrax disiuncta Wiedemann, 1830

= Lepidanthrax =

Genus of flies

Lepidanthrax is a genus of bee flies in the family Bombyliidae. There are at least 50 described species in Lepidanthrax. The genus is primarily North and Central American, but one species is recorded from the Galapagos Islands and two are recorded from Australia.

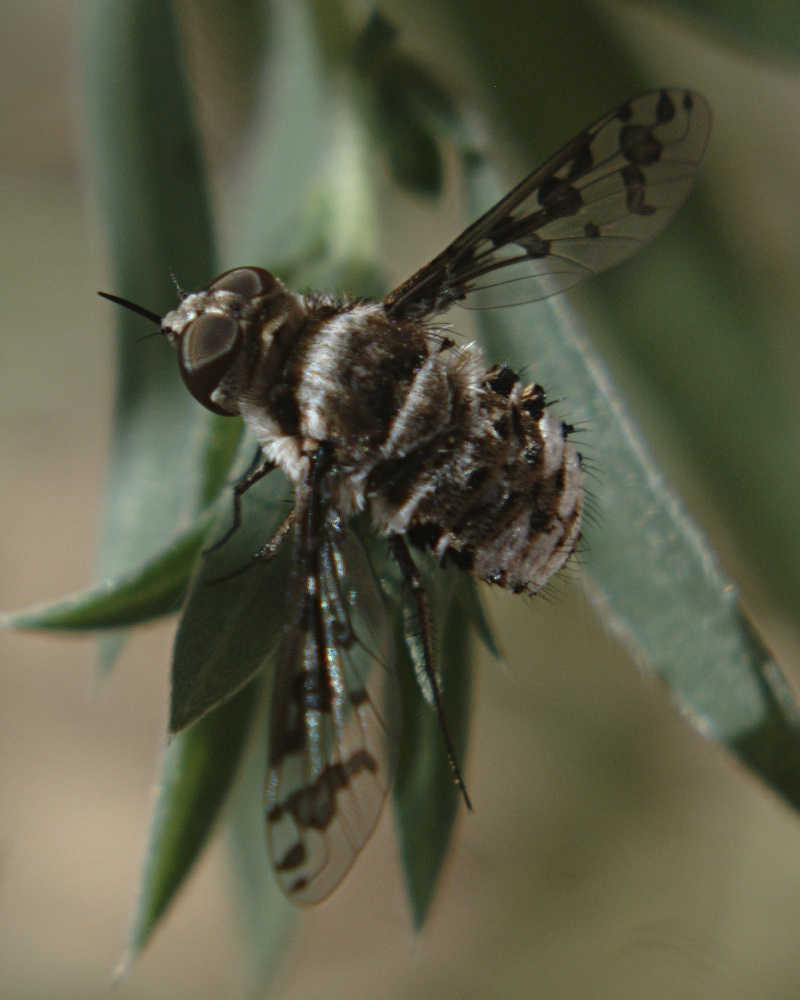

== Species ==
- Lepidanthrax actios Hall, 1976
- Lepidanthrax agrestis (Coquillett, 1887)
- Lepidanthrax albifrons Roberts, 1928
- Lepidanthrax angulus Osten Sacken, 1886
- Lepidanthrax arizonensis Hall, 1976
- Lepidanthrax arnaudi Hall, 1976
- Lepidanthrax borius Hall, 1976
- Lepidanthrax californicus Hall, 1976
- Lepidanthrax calyptus Hall, 1976
- Lepidanthrax campestris (Coquillett, 1887)
- Lepidanthrax capnopennis Hall, 1976
- Lepidanthrax capopennis Hall, 1976
- Lepidanthrax chalcus Hall, 1976
- Lepidanthrax chloristus Hall, 1976
- Lepidanthrax choristus Hall, 1976
- Lepidanthrax chrysus Hall, 1976
- Lepidanthrax coquilletti Evenhuis and Hall, 1999
- Lepidanthrax diaeretus Hall, 1976
- Lepidanthrax diamphus Hall, 1976
- Lepidanthrax disjunctus (Wiedemann, 1830)
- Lepidanthrax ellipus Hall, 1976
- Lepidanthrax eremicus Hall, 1976
- Lepidanthrax euthemus Hall, 1976
- Lepidanthrax exallus Hall, 1976
- Lepidanthrax fuscipennis Hall, 1976
- Lepidanthrax hesperus Hall, 1976
- Lepidanthrax homologus Hall, 1976
- Lepidanthrax hyalinipennis Cole, 1923
- Lepidanthrax hypomelus Hall, 1976
- Lepidanthrax hyposcelus Hall, 1976
- Lepidanthrax hyposelus Hall, 1976
- Lepidanthrax indecisus Curran, 1930
- Lepidanthrax lautus (Coquillett, 1887)
- Lepidanthrax leucocephalus Hall, 1976
- Lepidanthrax linguata Roberts, 1928
- Lepidanthrax linsdalei Hall, 1976
- Lepidanthrax litus Hall, 1976
- Lepidanthrax lutzi Curran, 1930
- Lepidanthrax meristus Hall, 1976
- Lepidanthrax mimus Hall, 1976
- Lepidanthrax morphnus Hall, 1976
- Lepidanthrax morphrus Hall, 1976
- Lepidanthrax oribates Hall, 1976
- Lepidanthrax painterorum Hall, 1976
- Lepidanthrax panamensis Curran, 1930
- Lepidanthrax periphanus Hall, 1976
- Lepidanthrax peristigus Hall, 1976
- Lepidanthrax photinus Hall, 1976
- Lepidanthrax proboscideus (Loew, 1869)
- Lepidanthrax rauchi Hall, 1976
- Lepidanthrax salvadorensis Hall, 1976
- Lepidanthrax sonorensis Hall, 1976
- Lepidanthrax stichus Hall, 1976
- Lepidanthrax symmachus Hall, 1976
- Lepidanthrax tinctus (Thomson, 1869)
- Lepidanthrax utahensis Hall, 1976
