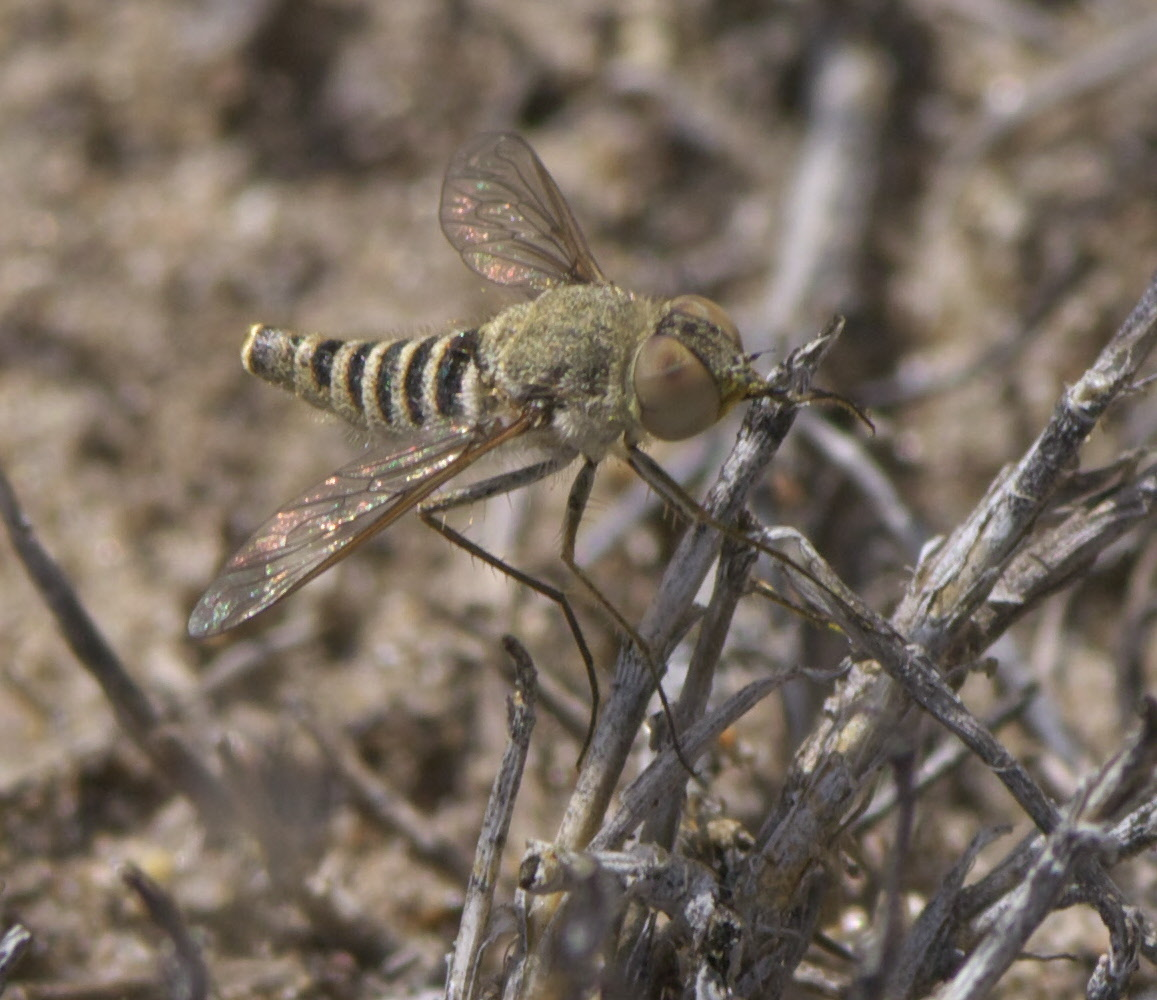
- Aphoebantus

Scientific classification
- Domain: Eukaryota
- Kingdom: Animalia
- Phylum: Arthropoda
- Class: Insecta
- Order: Diptera
- Family: Bombyliidae
- Subfamily: Anthracinae
- Tribe: Aphoebantini

= Aphoebantini =

Tribe of flies

Aphoebantini is a tribe of bee flies in the family Bombyliidae. There are about 5 genera and at least 80 described species in Aphoebantini.

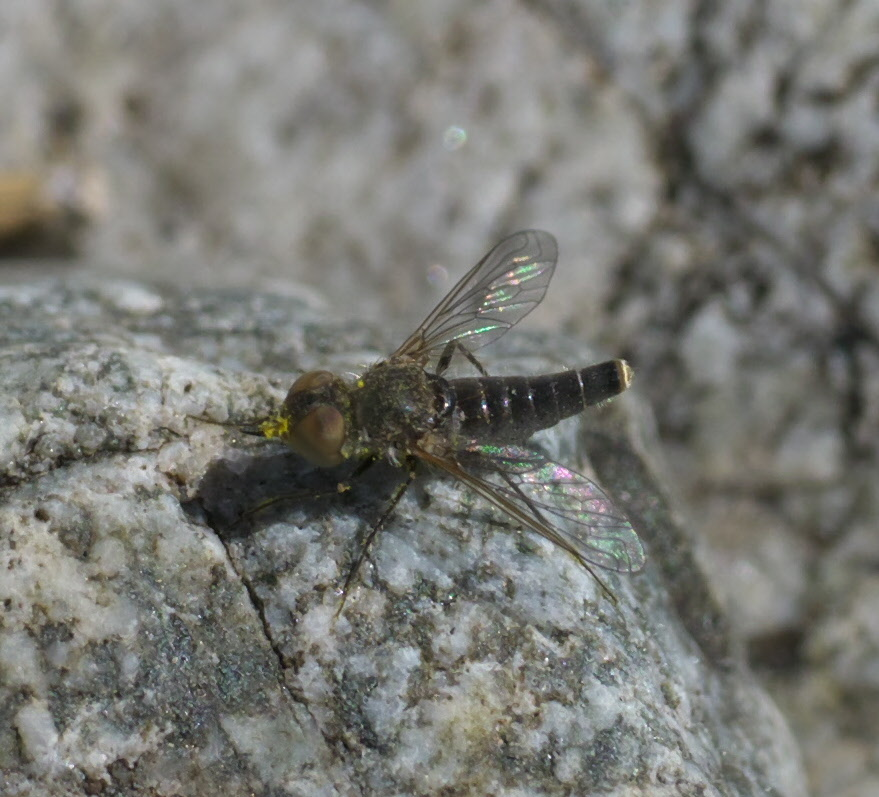
Aphoebantus

== Genera ==
- Aphoebantus Loew, 1872^{i c g b}
- Cononedys Hermann, 1907
- Epacmus Osten-Sacken, 1887^{i c g b}
- Eucessia Coquillett, 1886^{i c g b}
- ExepacmusCoquillett, 1894^{i c g}
- Pteraulacodes Hesse, 1956
- Pteraulax Bezzi, 1921

Data sources: i = ITIS, c = Catalogue of Life, g = GBIF, b = Bugguide.net
