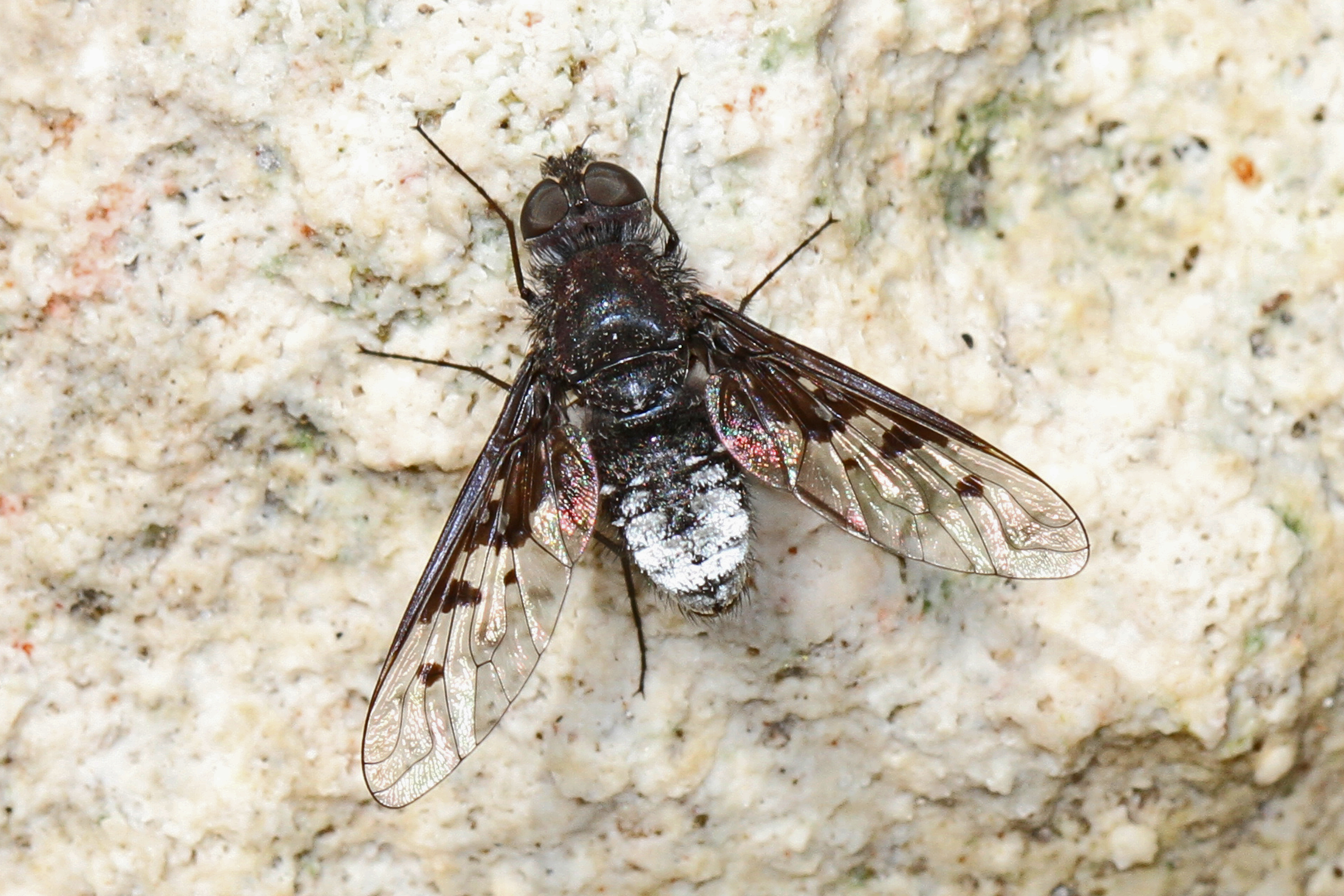
- Anthrax albofasciatus

Scientific classification
- Kingdom: Animalia
- Phylum: Arthropoda
- Class: Insecta
- Order: Diptera
- Family: Bombyliidae
- Subfamily: Anthracinae

= Anthracinae =

Subfamily of flies

Anthracinae is a subfamily of bee flies in the family Bombyliidae. There are more than 80 genera and 2,000 described species in Anthracinae.

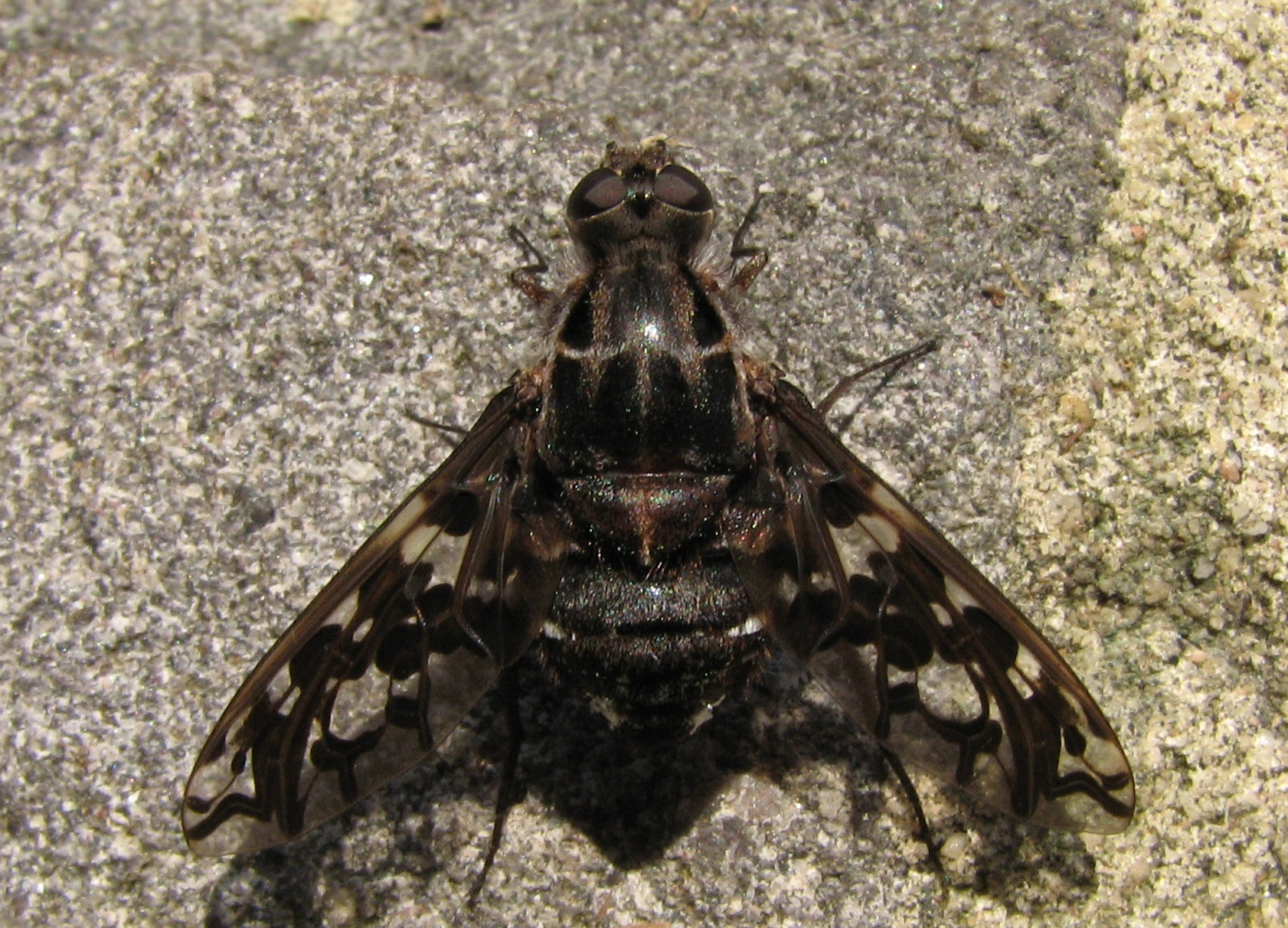
Xenox tigrinus

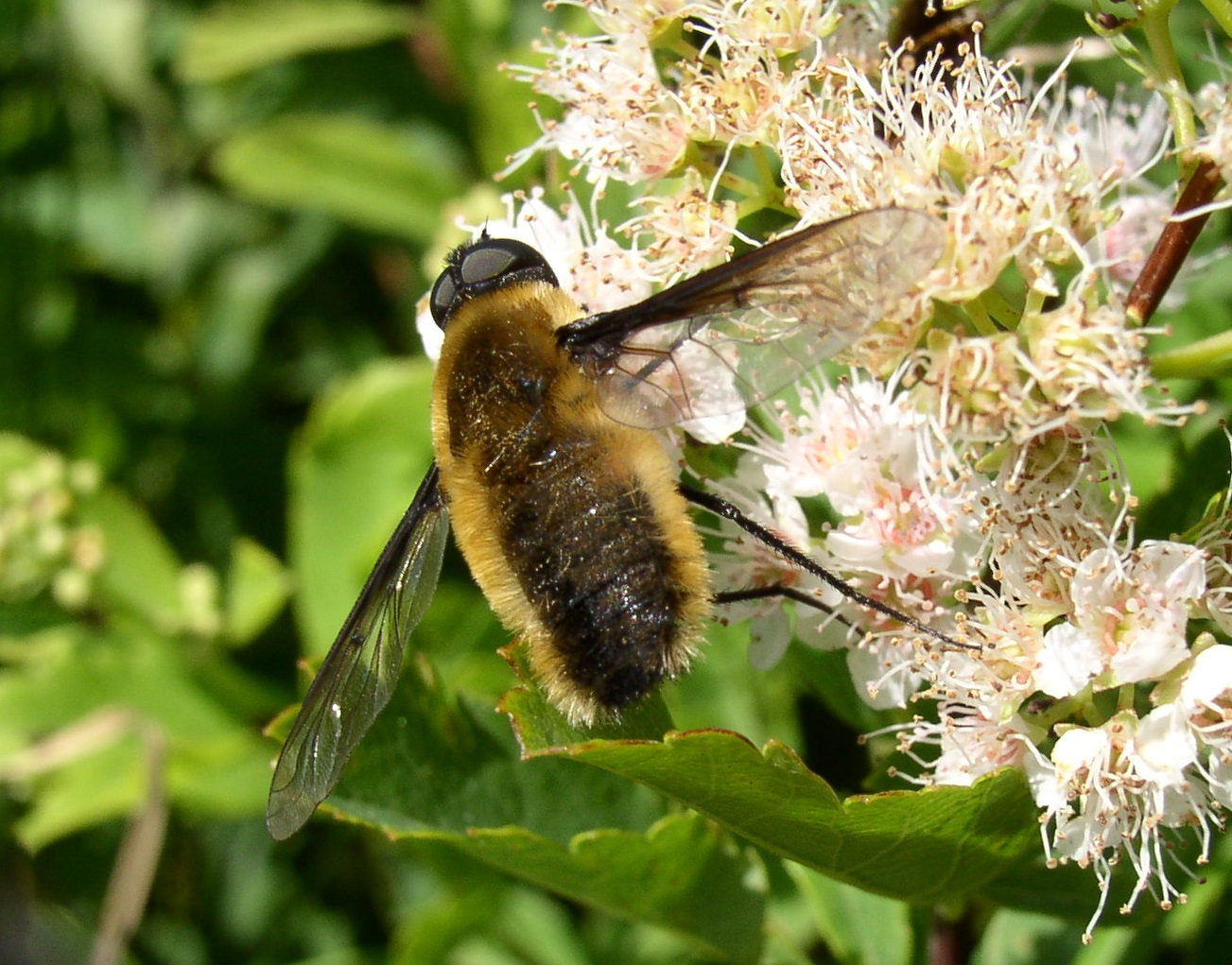
Villa fulviana

== Genera ==
- Anthrax Scopoli, 1763
- Aphoebantus Loew, 1872
- Astrophanes Osten Sacken, 1886
- Atrichochira Hesse, 1956
- Balaana Lambkin & Yeates, 2003
- Brachyanax Evenhuis, 1981
- Caecanthrax Greathead, 1980
- Chrysanthrax Osten Sacken, 1886
- Collosoptera Hull, 1973
- Conomyza Hesse, 1956
- Cononedys Hermann, 1907
- Coryprosopa Hesse, 1956
- Cyananthrax Painter, 1959
- Defilippia Lioy, 1864
- Desmatoneura Williston, 1895
- Deusopora Hull, 1971
- Diatropomma Bowden, 1962
- Dicranoclista Bezzi, 1924
- Diochanthrax Hall, 1975
- Dipalta Osten Sacken, 1877
- Diplocampta Schiner, 1868
- Epacmoides Hesse, 1956
- Epacmus Osten Sacken, 1886
- Eucessia Coquillett, 1886
- Euligyra Lambkin & Yeates, 2003
- Exechohypopion Evenhuis, 1991
- Exepacmus Coquillett, 1894
- Exhyalanthrax Becker, 1916
- Exoprosopa Macquart, 1840
- Hemipenthes Loew, 1869
- Heteralonia Rondani, 1863
- Hyperalonia Rondani, 1863
- Ins Evenhuis, 2020
- Kapu Lambkin & Yeates, 2006
- Laminanthrax Greathead, 1967
- Larrpana Lambkin & Yeates, 2003
- Lepidanthrax Osten Sacken, 1886
- Ligyra Newman, 1841
- Litorhina Bowden, 1975
- Mancia Coquillett, 1886
- Marleyimyia Hesse, 1956
- Mesoclis Bezzi, 1921
- Micomitra Bowden, 1964
- Munjua Lambkin & Yeates, 2003
- Muwarna Lambkin & Yeates, 2003
- Neodiplocampta Curran, 1934
- Ngalki Lambkin, 2011
- Oestranthrax Bezzi, 1921
- Oestrimyza Hull, 1973
- Pachyanthrax François, 1964
- Palirika Lambkin & Yeates, 2003
- Paradiplocampta Hall, 1975
- Paranthrax Bigot, 1876
- Paravilla Painter, 1933
- Petrorossia Bezzi, 1908
- Pipunculopsis Bezzi, 1925
- Plesiocera Macquart, 1840
- Poecilanthrax Osten Sacken, 1886
- Prorostoma Hesse, 1956
- Prothaplocnemis Bezzi, 1925
- Pseudopenthes Roberts, 1928
- Pteraulacodes Hesse, 1956
- Pteraulax Bezzi, 1921
- Pterobates Bezzi, 1921
- Rhynchanthrax Painter, 1933
- Satyramoeba Sack, 1909
- Spogostylum Macquart, 1840
- Stomylomyia Bigot, 1887
- Stonyx Osten Sacken, 1886
- Synthesia Bezzi, 1921
- Thraxan Yeates & Lambkin, 1998
- Thyridanthrax Osten Sacken, 1886
- Turkmeniella Paramonov, 1940
- Veribubo Evenhuis, 1978
- Villa Lioy, 1864
- Villoestrus Paramonov, 1931
- Walkeromyia Paramonov, 1934
- Wurda Lambkin & Yeates, 2003
- Xenox Evenhuis, 1985
- Xeramoeba Hesse, 1956
- † Anthracida Germar, 1849
- † Pachysystropus Cockerell, 1909
- † Palaeogeron Meunier, 1915
- † Tithonomyia Evenhuis, 1984
- † Verrallites Cockerell, 1913
