= Paravilla =

Scientific classification
- Domain: Eukaryota
- Kingdom: Animalia
- Phylum: Arthropoda
- Class: Insecta
- Order: Diptera
- Family: Bombyliidae
- Subfamily: Anthracinae
- Tribe: Villini
- Genus: Paravilla; Painter, 1933

Genus of flies

Paravilla is a genus of bee flies in the family Bombyliidae. There are at least 50 described species in Paravilla. The genus is found in North and South America.

== Species ==
- List of Paravilla species
