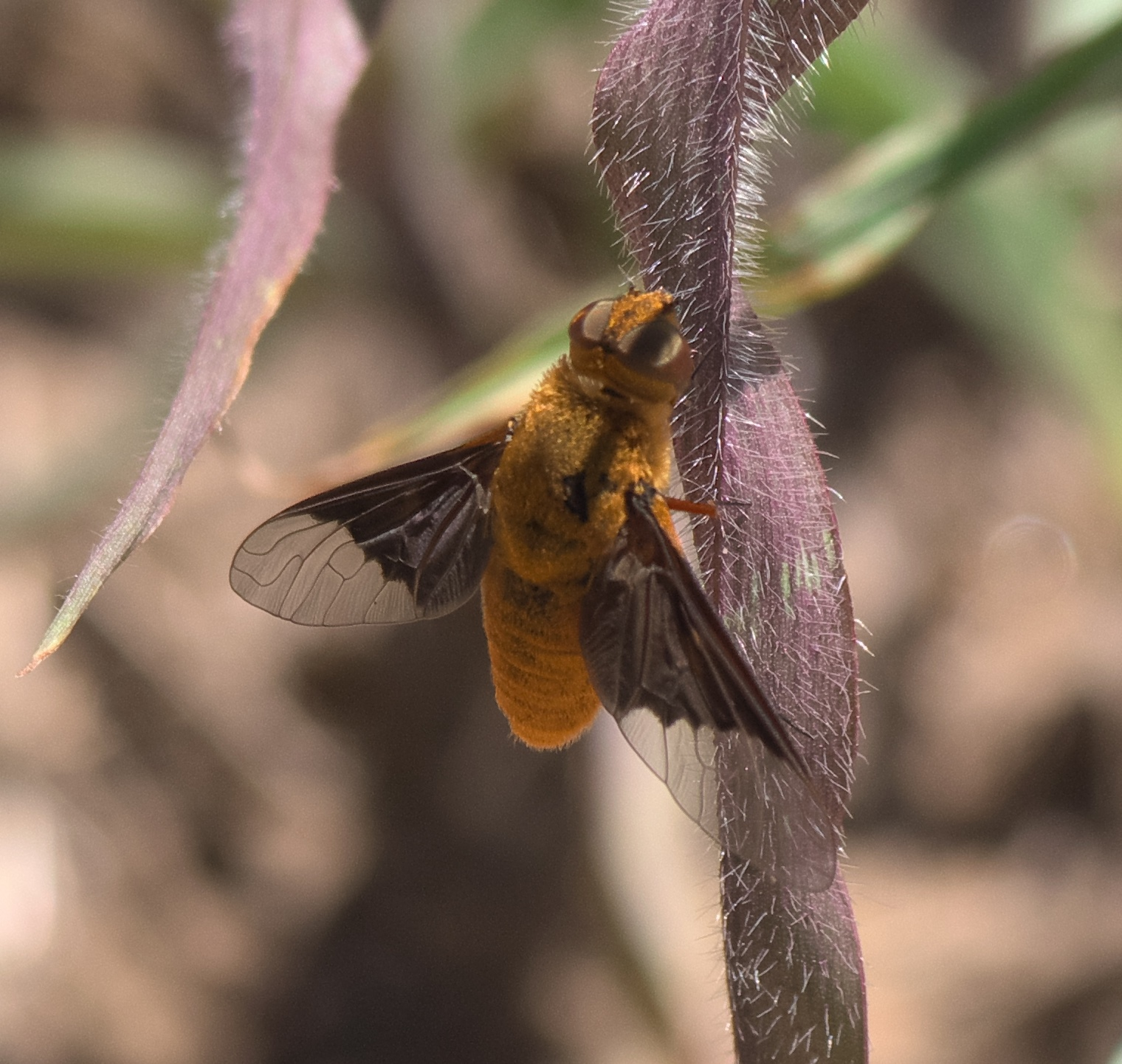
- Chrysanthrax cypris

Scientific classification
- Domain: Eukaryota
- Kingdom: Animalia
- Phylum: Arthropoda
- Class: Insecta
- Order: Diptera
- Family: Bombyliidae
- Subfamily: Anthracinae
- Tribe: Villini; Hull, 1973

= Villini =

Tribe of flies

Villini is a tribe of bee flies in the family Bombyliidae.

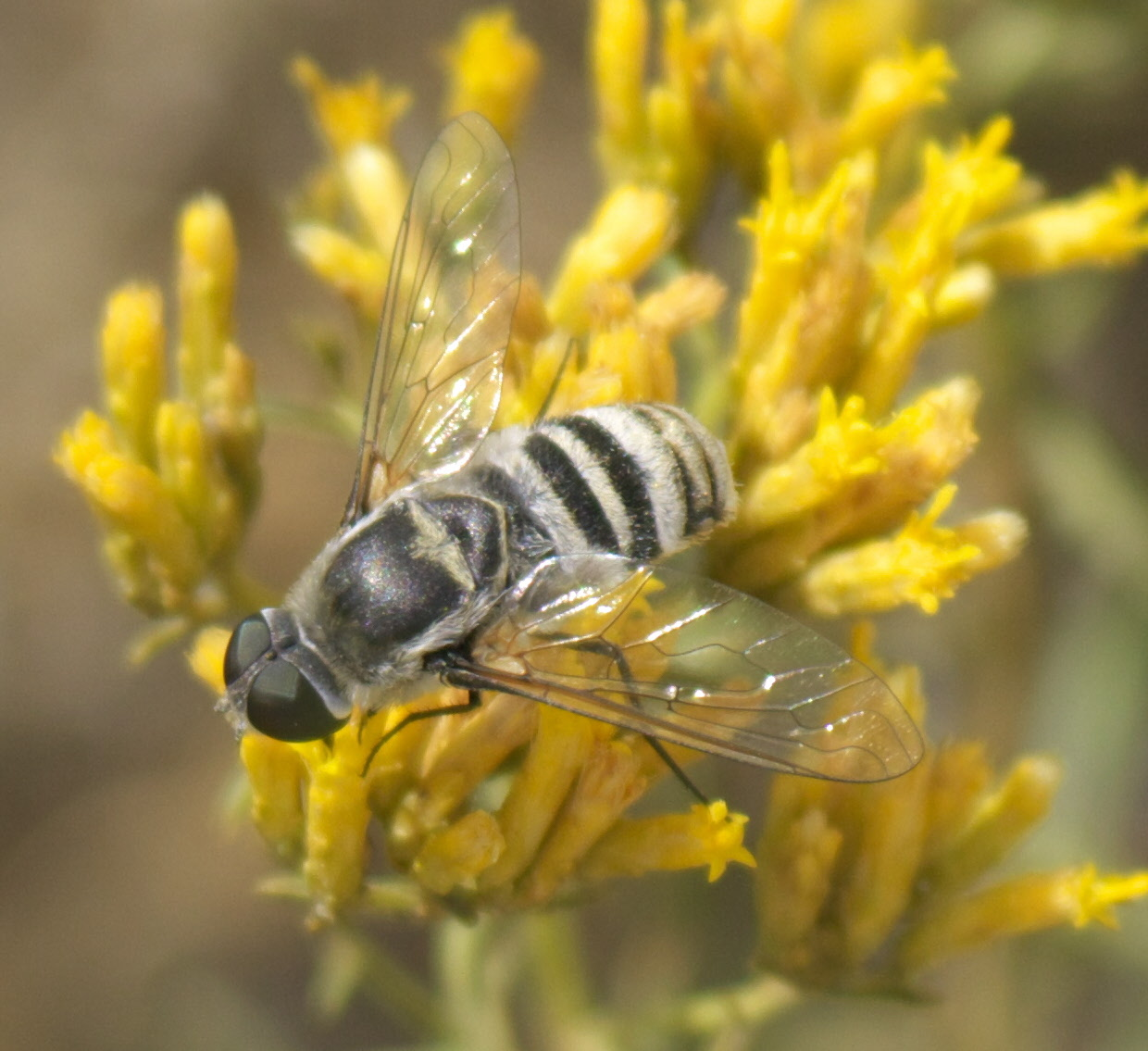
Villa

== Genera ==
- Astrophanes Osten Sacken, 1886
- Caecanthrax Greathead, 1981
- Chrysanthrax Osten Sacken, 1886
- Cyananthrax Painter, 1959
- Deusopora Hull, 1971
- Diochanthrax Hall, 1975
- Dipalta Osten Sacken, 1877
- Diplocampta Schiner, 1868
- Exechohypopion Evenhuis, 1991
- Exhyalanthrax Becker, 1916
- Hemipenthes Loew, 1869
- Ins Evenhuis, 2020
- Laminanthrax Greathead, 1967
- Lepidanthrax Osten Sacken, 1886
- Mancia Coquillett, 1886
- Marleyimyia Hesse, 1956
- Neodiplocampta Curran, 1934
- Oestranthrax Bezzi, 1921
- Oestrimyza Hull, 1973
- Pachyanthrax François, 1964
- Paradiplocampta Hall, 1975
- Paranthrax Bigot 1876
- Paravilla Painter, 1933
- Poecilanthrax Osten Sacken, 1886
- Rhynchanthrax Painter, 1933
- Stonyx Osten Sacken, 1886
- Synthesia Bezzi, 1921
- Thyridanthrax Osten Sacken, 1886
- Veribubo Evenhuis, 1978
- Villa Lioy, 1864
- Villoestrus Paramonov, 1931
