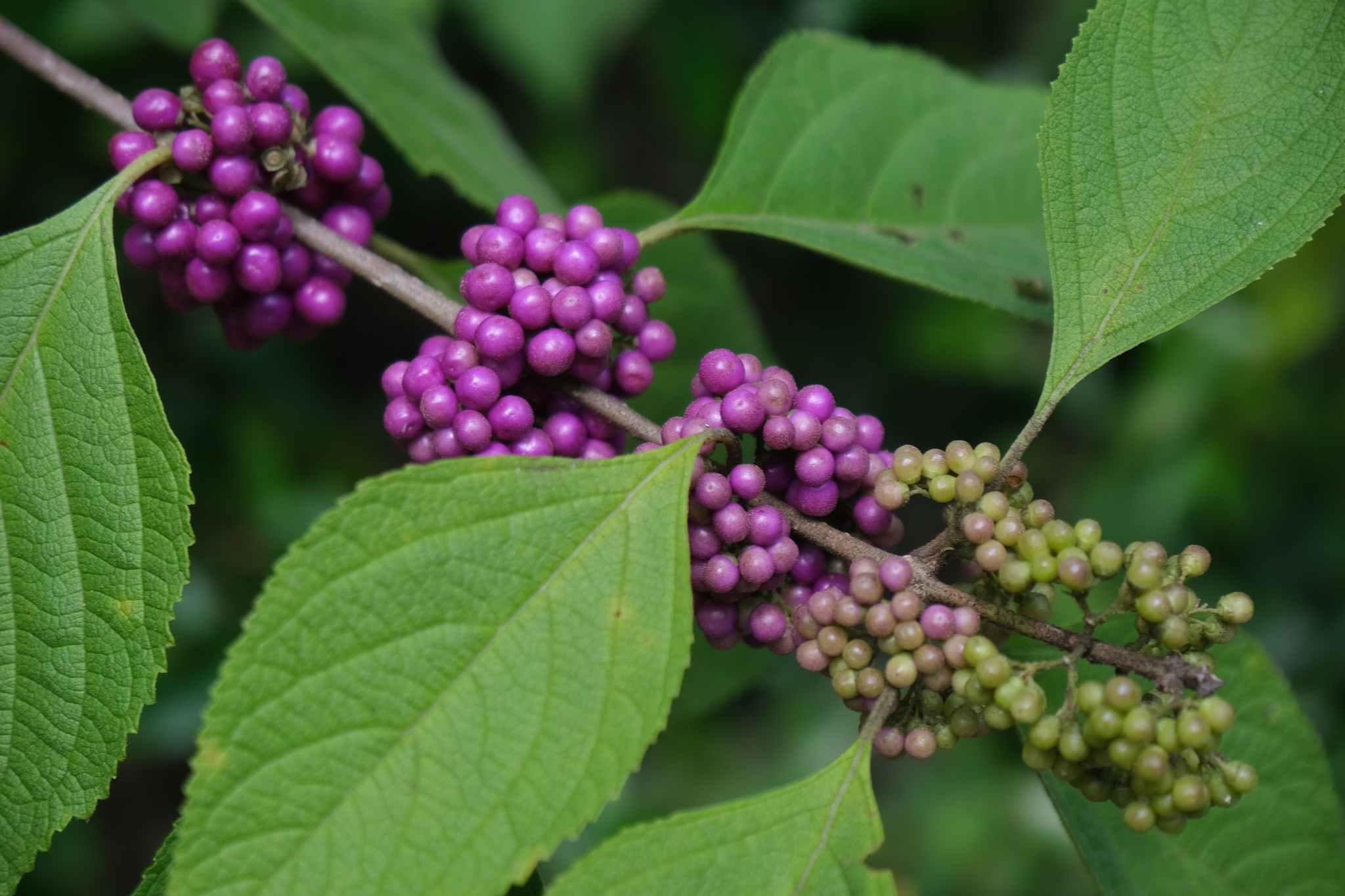

Conservation status
- Least Concern (IUCN 3.1)

Scientific classification
- Kingdom: Plantae
- Clade: Tracheophytes
- Clade: Angiosperms
- Clade: Eudicots
- Clade: Asterids
- Order: Lamiales
- Family: Lamiaceae
- Genus: Callicarpa
- Species: C. americana

Binomial name
- Callicarpa americana L.

= Callicarpa americana =

Species of flowering plant

Callicarpa americana, commonly called the American beautyberry, is an open-habitat, native shrub of the Southern United States which is often grown as an ornamental in gardens and yards. American beautyberries produce large clusters of purple berries, which birds and deer eat, thus distributing the seeds.

== Description ==
Callicarpa americana is a shrub that grows up to about 3 meters tall. The stems are densely covered with stellate, scurfy hairs that sometimes produce a tomentose texture. The stem hairs are shed once the stems become woody.

The leaves are arranged oppositely, or rarely in whorls of three, with petioles measuring 0.5 to 3.5 centimeters long. Leaf blades are ovate to elliptic in shape, ranging from 8 to 23 centimeters long and 3.5 to 13 centimeters wide, and the margins are coarsely toothed. When young, the leaves are densely covered with stellate scurfy hairs, later becoming nearly hairless on the upper surface.

The inflorescences form compact, many-flowered cymes that are typically shorter than the petiole. The calyx is 1.6 to 1.8 millimeters long and has four very short teeth. The corolla ranges from bluish to pinkish, sometimes white, with a tube 2.6 to 3 millimeters long and blunt lobes 1.3 to 1.5 millimeters long.

The fruit ripens to rose-pink to purple, measures 3 to 6 millimeters, and forms dense clusters. Only the skin of the fruit has color, the interior is white.

== Uses ==
The raw berries, while palatably sweet, are suitable for human consumption only in small amounts, because they are astringent. Some people have reported mild stomach cramps after consumption. The berries are also used in jellies and wine. The roots are used to make herbal tea. As a folk remedy it has been claimed that "fresh, crushed leaves of American beautyberry, Callicarpa americana ... helped keep biting insects away from animals such as horses and mules". A chemical compound isolated from the plant, callicarpenal, was effective as a mosquito repellent in a laboratory experiment using a simulated skin model.

The berries ripen in September through October and are a favorite among wild bird species including cardinals, mockingbirds, finches, woodpeckers and more. Beautyberry is commonly planted in landscape designs to attract wildlife because of the food source the berries provide and the cover animals get from the shrub itself. This plant is considered good for ornamental uses due to its minimal maintenance requirements and attractive berries.

== Distribution ==
The native range of C. americana extends from Maryland to Florida, west to Texas and Arkansas, and also Mexico, Bermuda, the Bahamas and Cuba.

== Characteristics ==
Plants with white berries are found in cultivation under the name Callicarpa americana var. lactea; not all authorities recognize this as a distinct variety (in the sense of the botanical rank below subspecies).

Propagation can be accomplished by making traditional cuttings; or germinating fully ripened (purple) seeds in pots or growing flats; or by scattering seeds on bare ground in a suitable area and lightly covering them or stepping on them to gently press them into the soil.

== Ecology ==
Callicarpa americana is insect pollinated and is recorded to have been visited in northern Florida by Augochloropsis metallica, Lasioglossum apopkense, Lasioglossum imitatum, Lasioglossum longifrons, Lasioglossum reticulatum, Lasioglossum tegulare/puteulanum, Lasioglossum weemsi/leviense, Megachile petulans, and Xylocopa virginica.

== Gallery ==
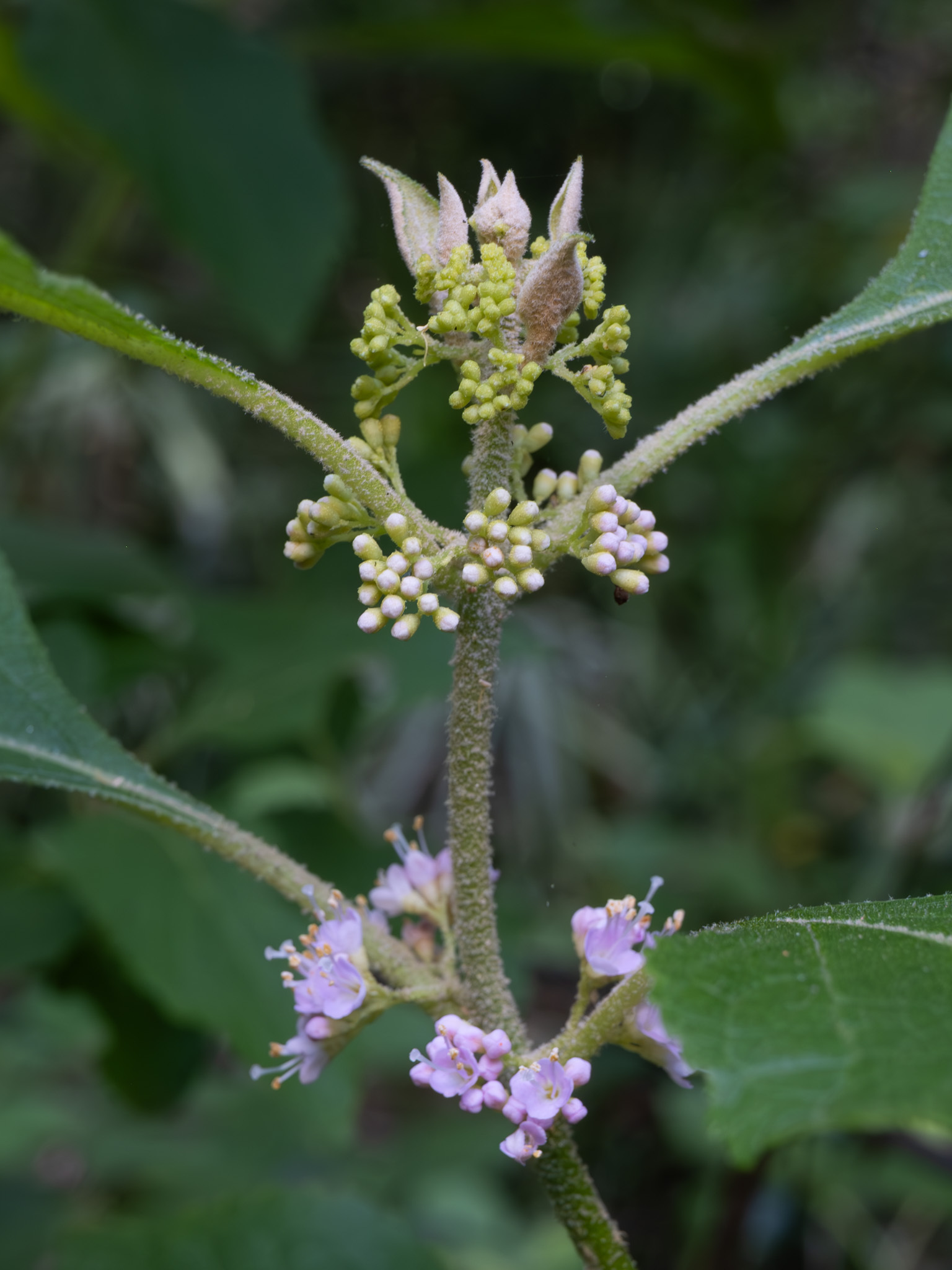
Flowers and buds

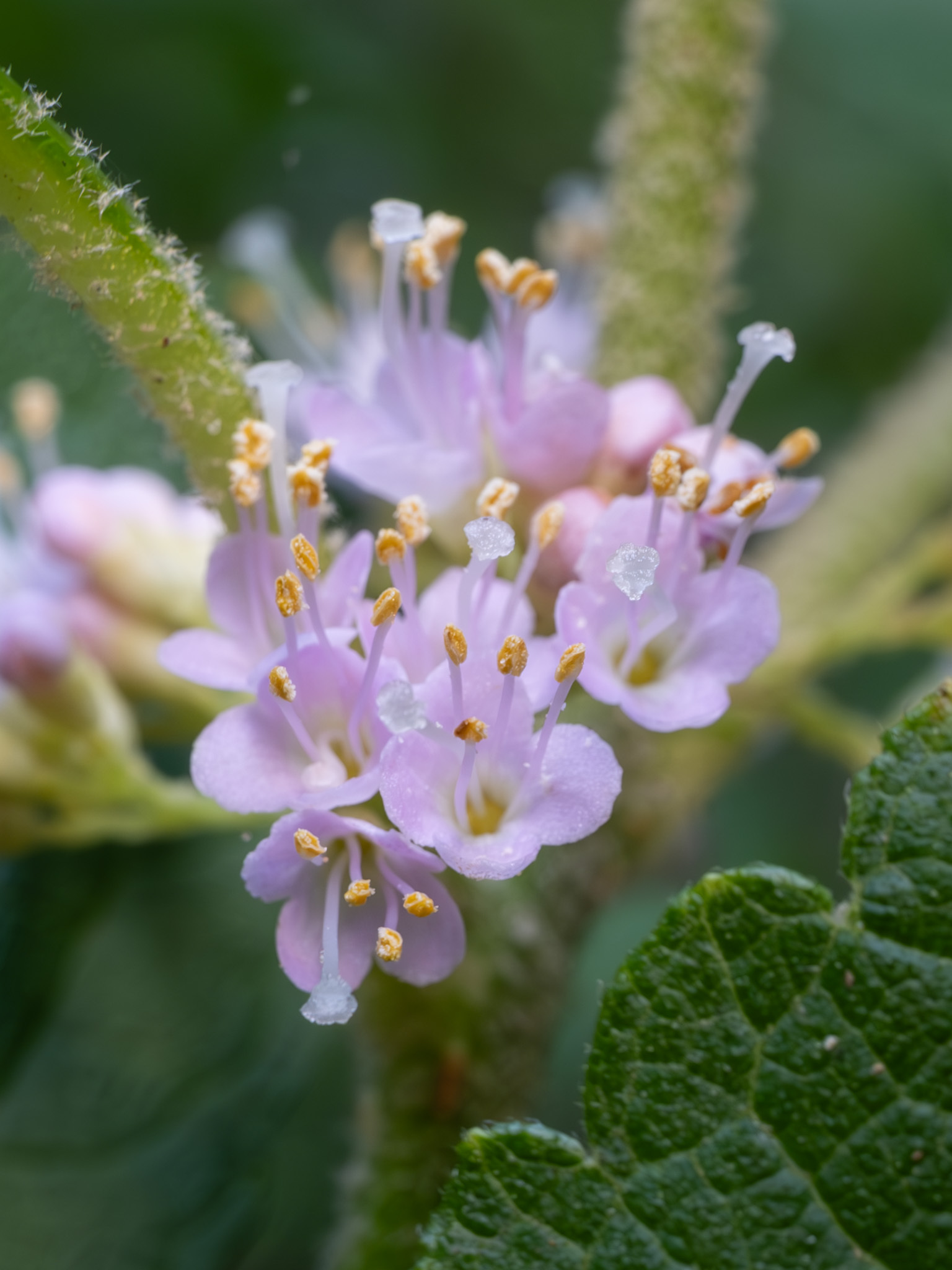
Flowers

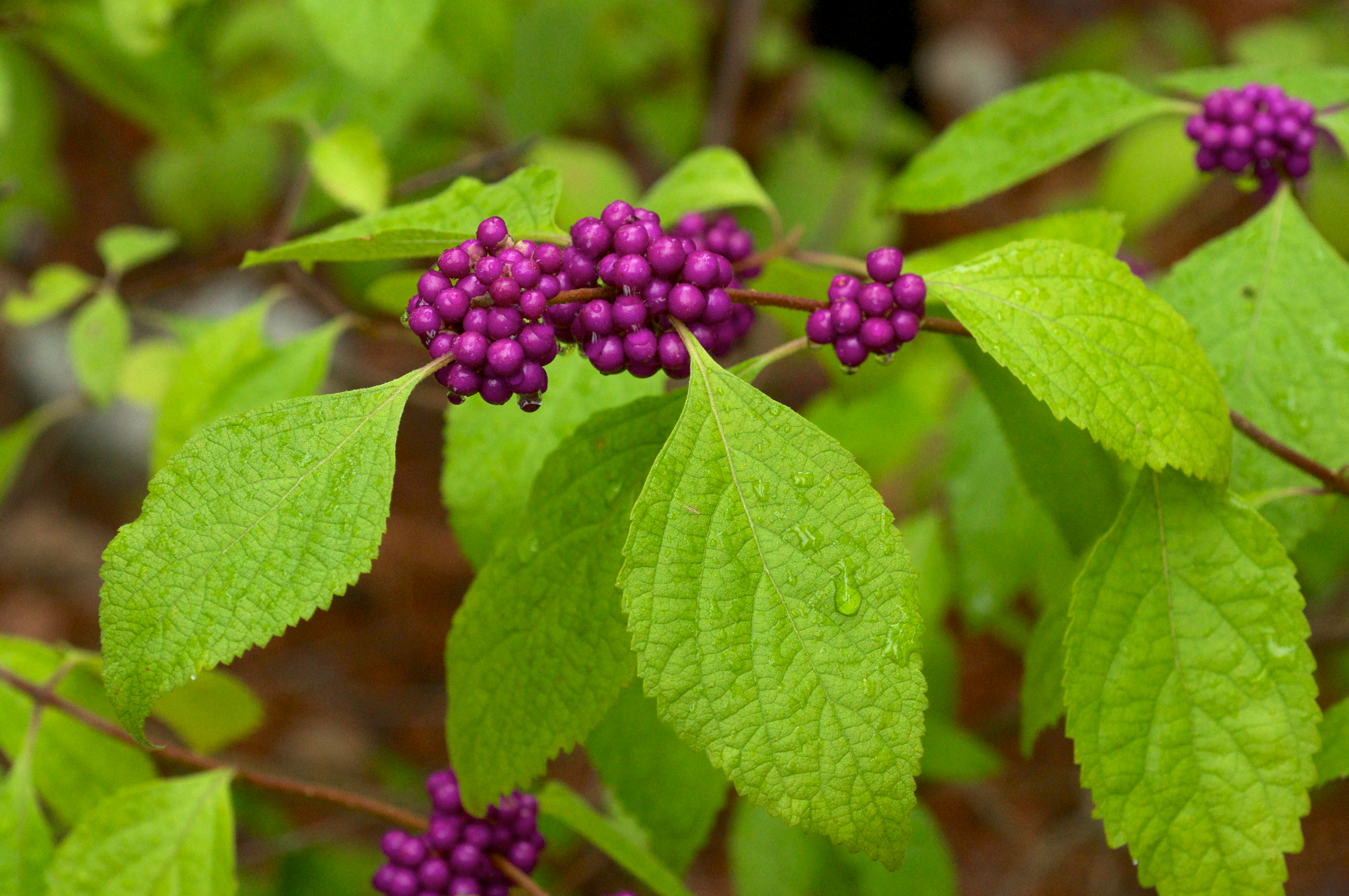
Fruits

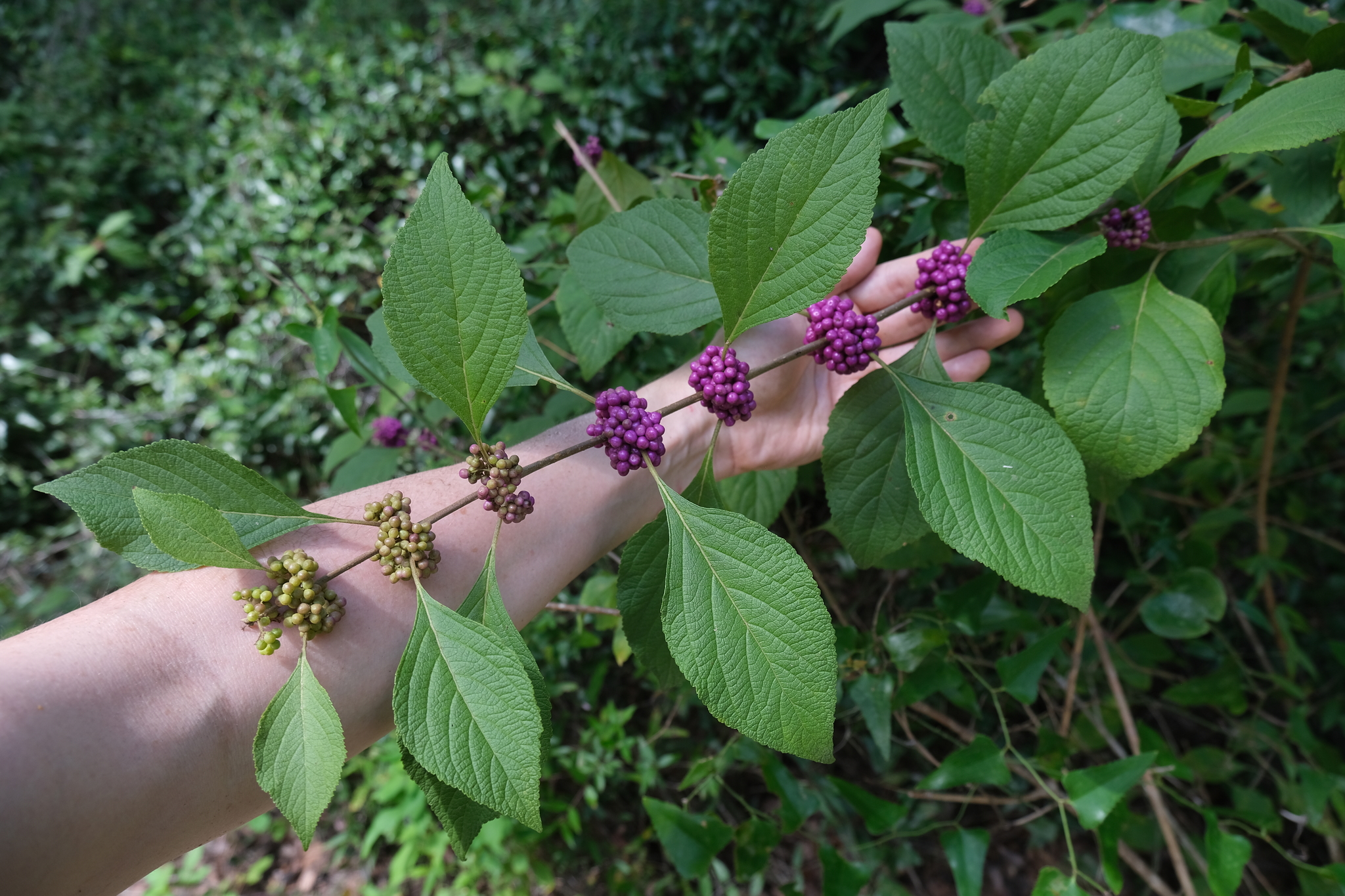
Infructescence

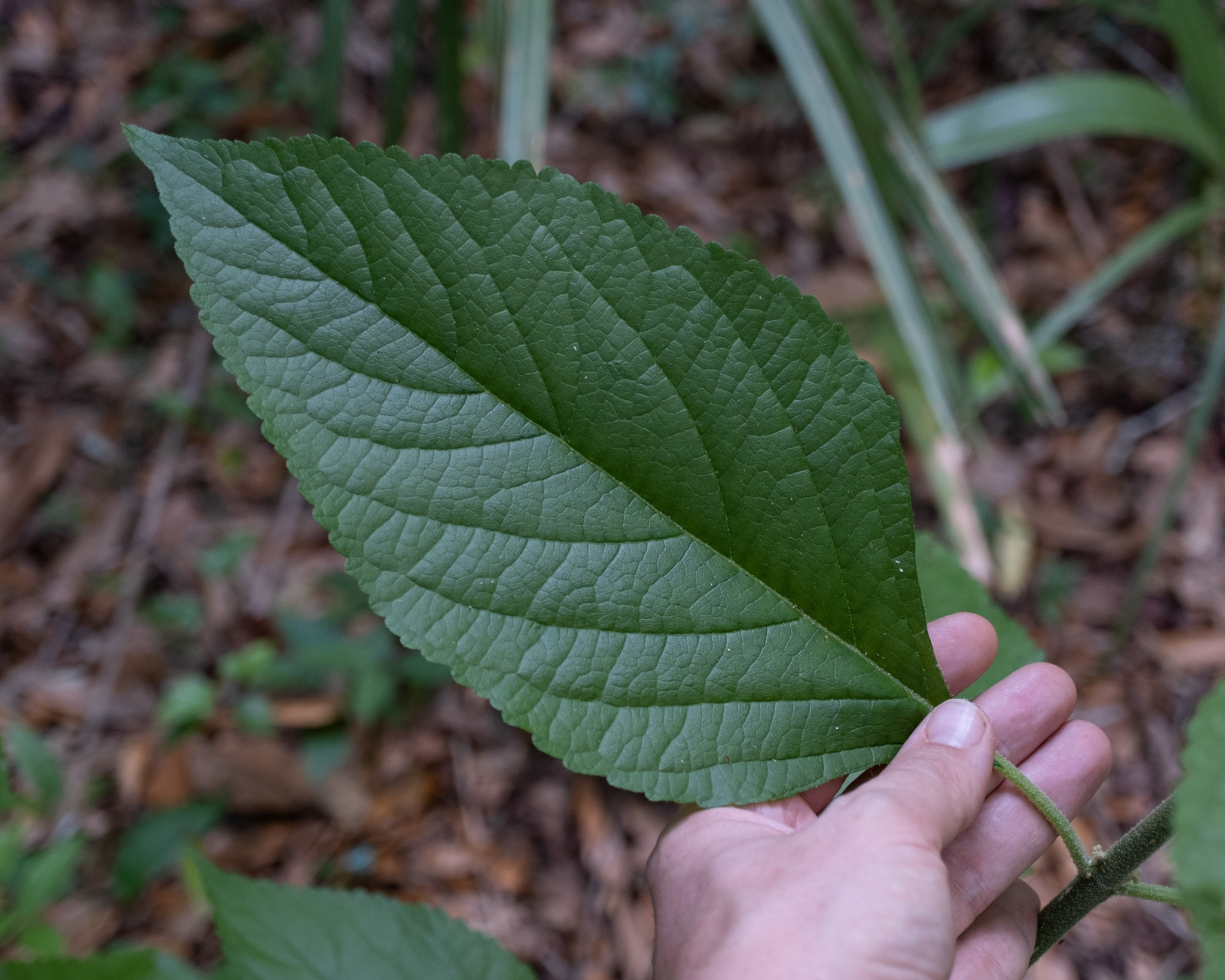
Leaf

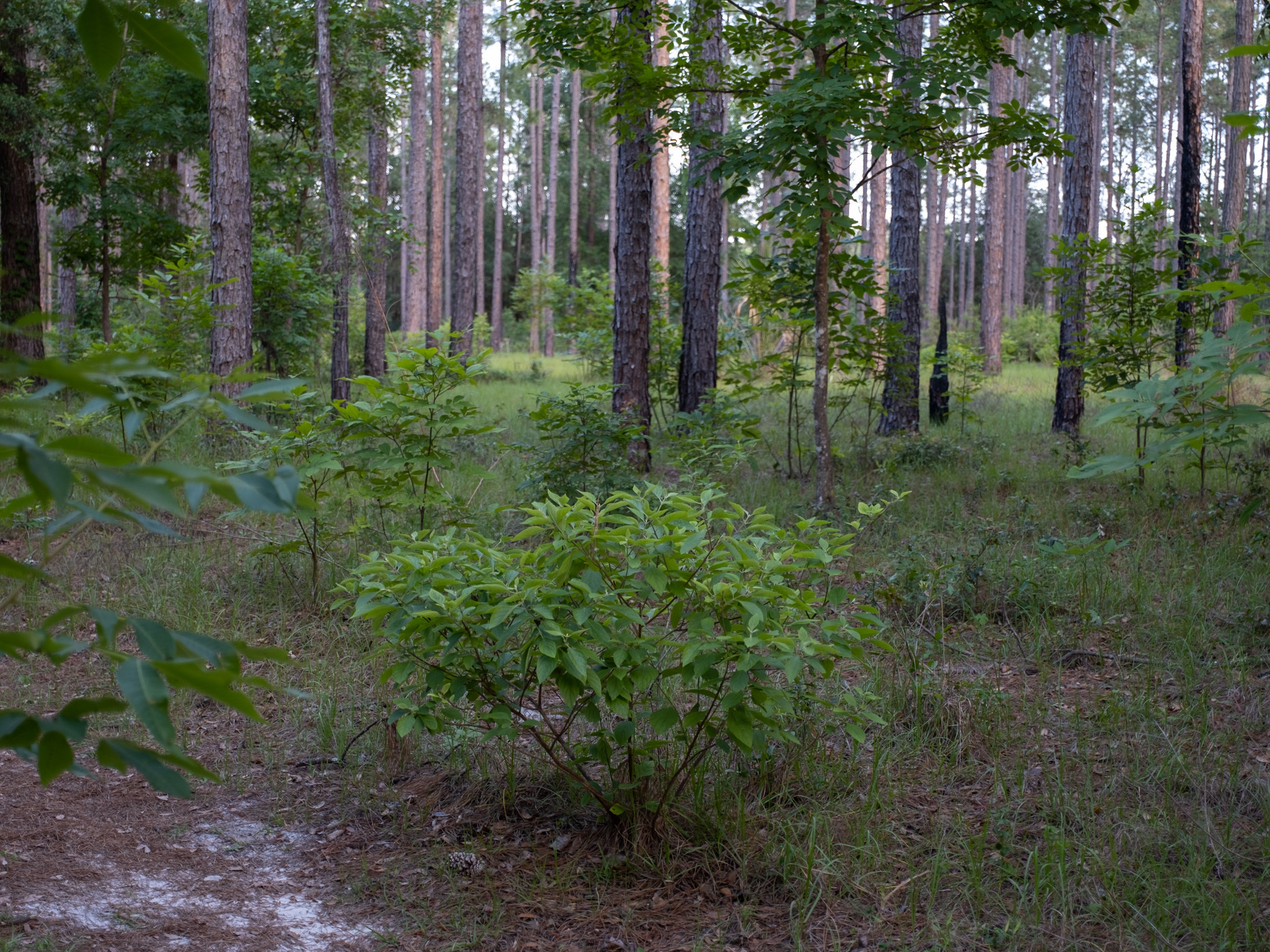
In open pine habitat

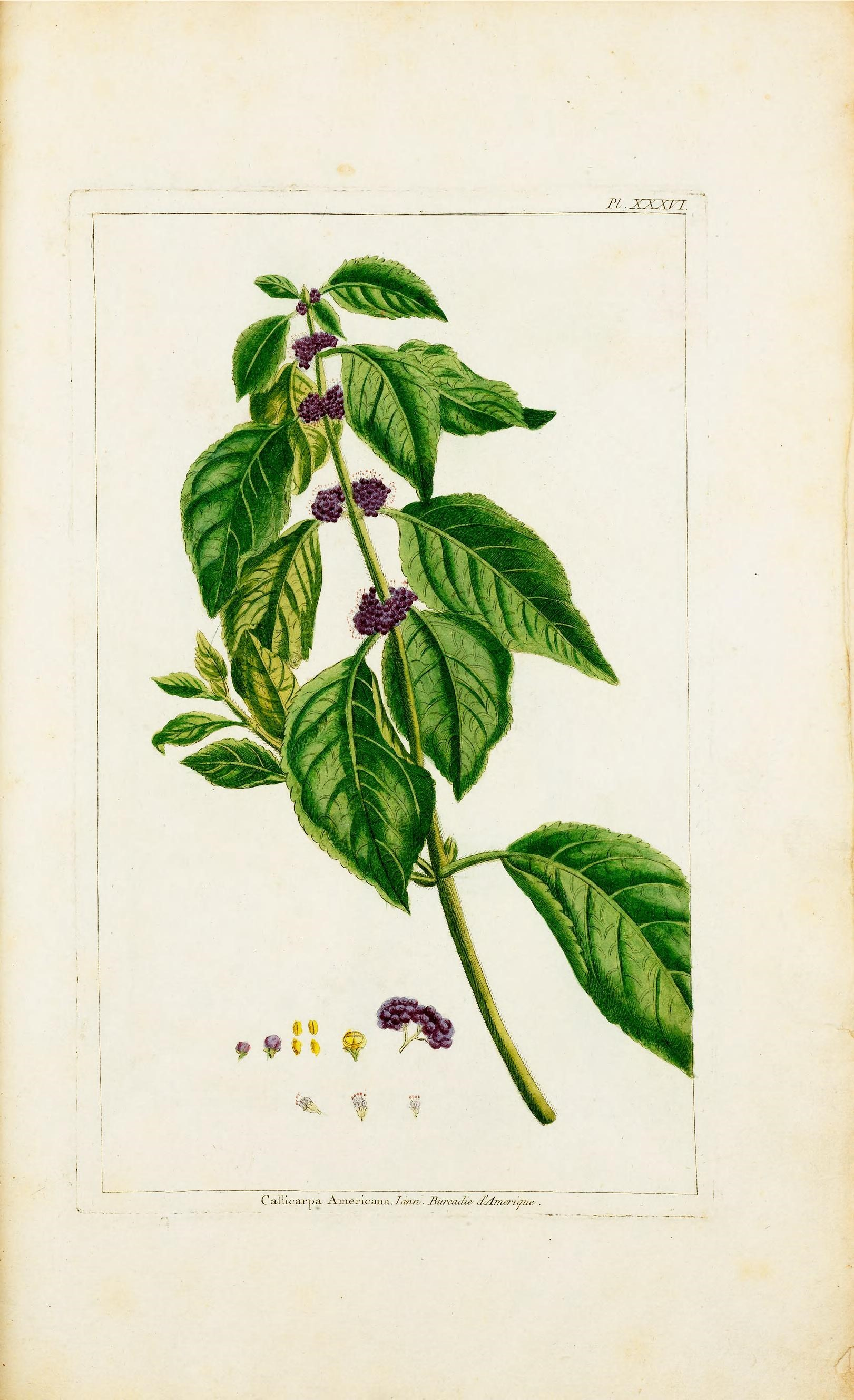
Illustration
