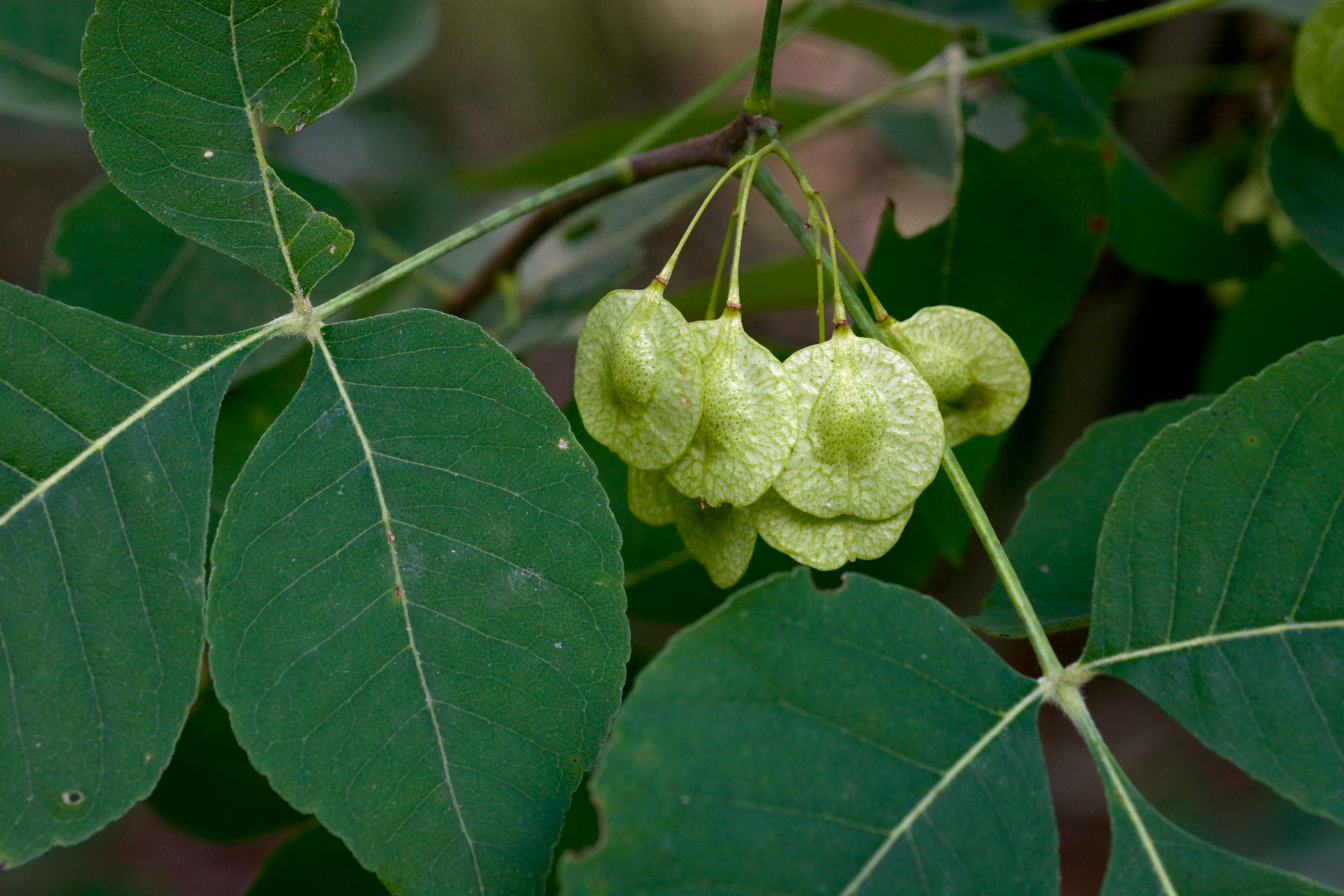
- Common hoptree fruit

Conservation status
- Least Concern (IUCN 3.1)

Scientific classification
- Kingdom: Plantae
- Clade: Tracheophytes
- Clade: Angiosperms
- Clade: Eudicots
- Clade: Rosids
- Order: Sapindales
- Family: Rutaceae
- Genus: Ptelea
- Species: P. trifoliata

Binomial name
- Ptelea trifoliata L.
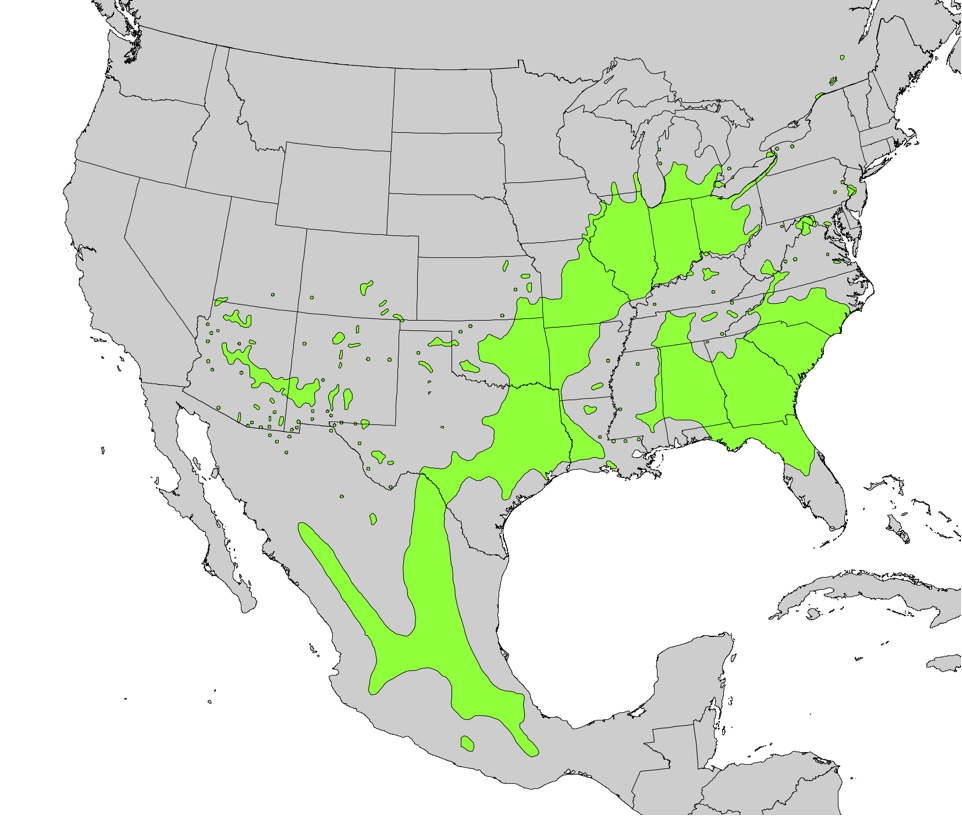
- Generalized natural range

Synonyms
- Dodonaea trifoliata Trew; Ptelea angustifolia Benth.; Ptelea coahuilensis Greene; Ptelea confinis Greene; Ptelea pallida Greene; Ptelea persicifolia Greene; Ptelea polyadenia Greene; Ptelea pumila Greene

= Ptelea trifoliata =

Species of tree

Ptelea trifoliata, commonly known as common hoptree, wafer ash, stinking ash, and skunk bush, is a species of flowering plant in the citrus family (Rutaceae). It is native to North America, where it is found in Canada, Mexico, and the United States. It is a deciduous shrub or tree, with alternate, trifoliate leaves.

== Description ==
Ptelea trifoliata is a small tree, or often a shrub of a few spreading stems, growing to around 6–8 m (20–26 ft) tall with a broad crown. The bark is reddish brown to gray brown, with short horizontal lenticels (warty corky ridges), becoming slightly scaly, The plant has an unpleasant odor and bitter taste. Branchlets are dark reddish brown, shining, covered with small excrescences. The twigs are slender to moderately stout, brown with deep U-shaped leaf scars, and with short, light brown, fuzzy buds. It has thick fleshy roots.

=== Leaves ===
Its leaves are alternate and compound with three leaflets, dotted with oil glands. The leaflets are sessile, ovate or oblong, 3–5 in (7.6–12.7 cm) long by 2–3 in (5.1–7.6 cm) broad, pointed at the base, entire or serrate, and gradually pointed at the apex. They are feather-veined, with a prominent midrib and primary veins. They come out of the bud conduplicate and very downy. When fully grown the leaves are dark green and shiny above and paler green beneath. In autumn they turn a rusty yellow. The petioles are stout, 6.3–7.6 cm (2.5–3.0 in) long, with an enlarged base. Stipules are absent. The western and southwestern forms have smaller leaves, 5–11 cm (2.0–4.3 in), than the eastern forms 10–18 cm (3.9–7.1 in), an adaptation to the drier climates in the west.

=== Flowers ===
The flowers are small, 1–2 cm (0.39–0.79 in) across, with 4–5 narrow, greenish white petals. The pedicels are downy. The 4- or 5-part calyx is downy and imbricate in bud. The corolla has four or five petals which are white, downy, spreading, hypogynous, and imbricate in bud. The five stamens alternate with the petals. The pistillate flowers bear rudimentary anthers. The filaments are awl-shaped and more-or-less hairy. The anthers are ovate or cordate, two-celled, with cells opening longitudinally. The ovaries are superior, hairy, abortive in the staminate flowers, two to three-celled. The style is short, the stigma 2- or 3-lobed, with two ovules per cell. Fertile and sterile flowers are produced together in terminal, spreading, compound cymes—the sterile being usually fewer and falling after the anther cells mature.

Flowers are produced in May and June. Some find the odor unpleasant but to others the plant has a delicious scent.

=== Fruit ===
The fruit is a round wafer-like papery samara, 2–2.5 cm (0.79–0.98 in) across, light brown, and two-seeded. The fruit ripens in October, and is held on the tree until high winds shake them loose in the early winter.

=== Wood ===
Its wood is yellow brown; heavy, hard, close-grained, satiny. The specific gravity is 0.8319; weight per cubic foot is 51.84 lb (23.51 kg).

== Gallery ==
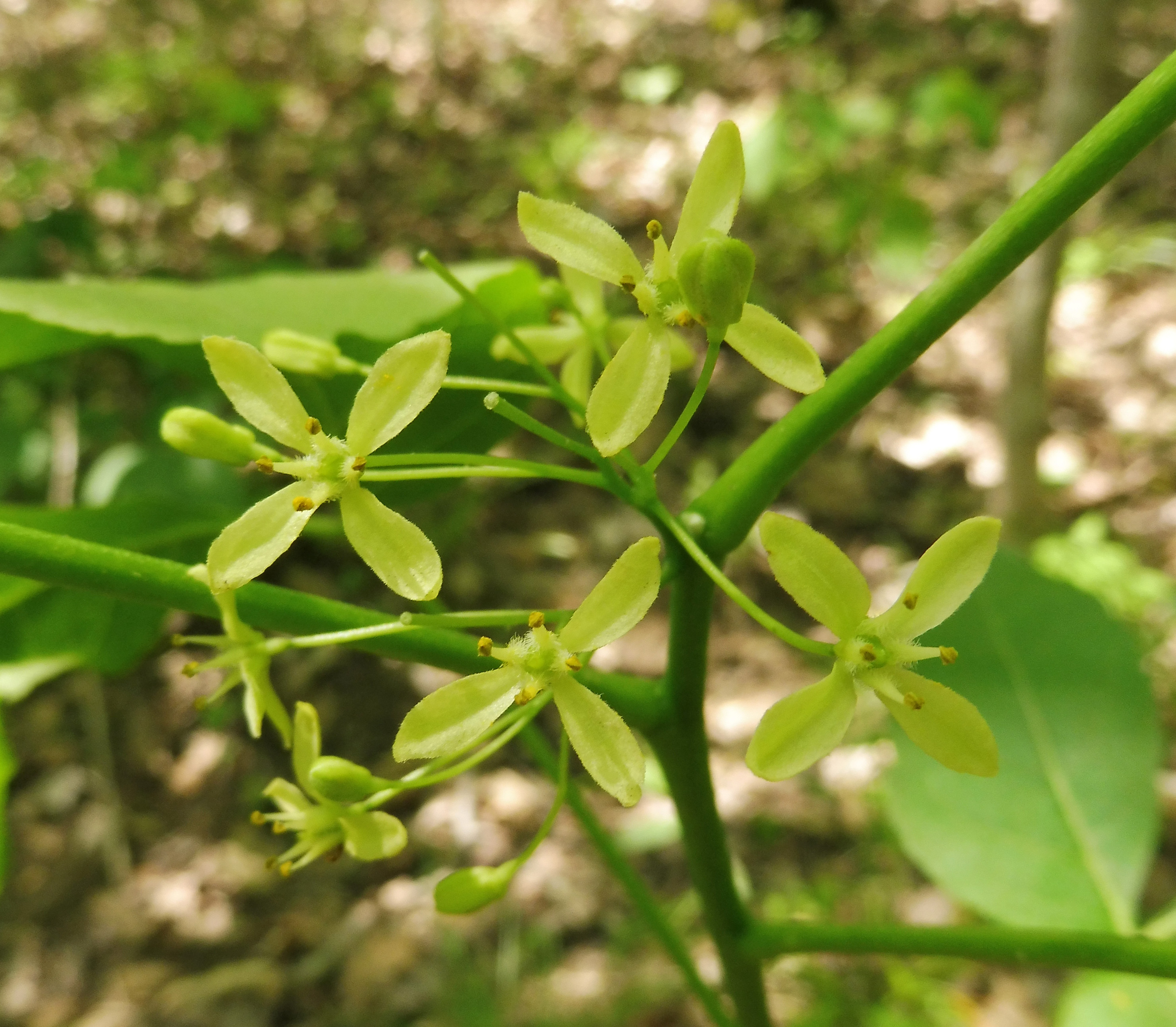
Flowers of Ptelea trifoliata

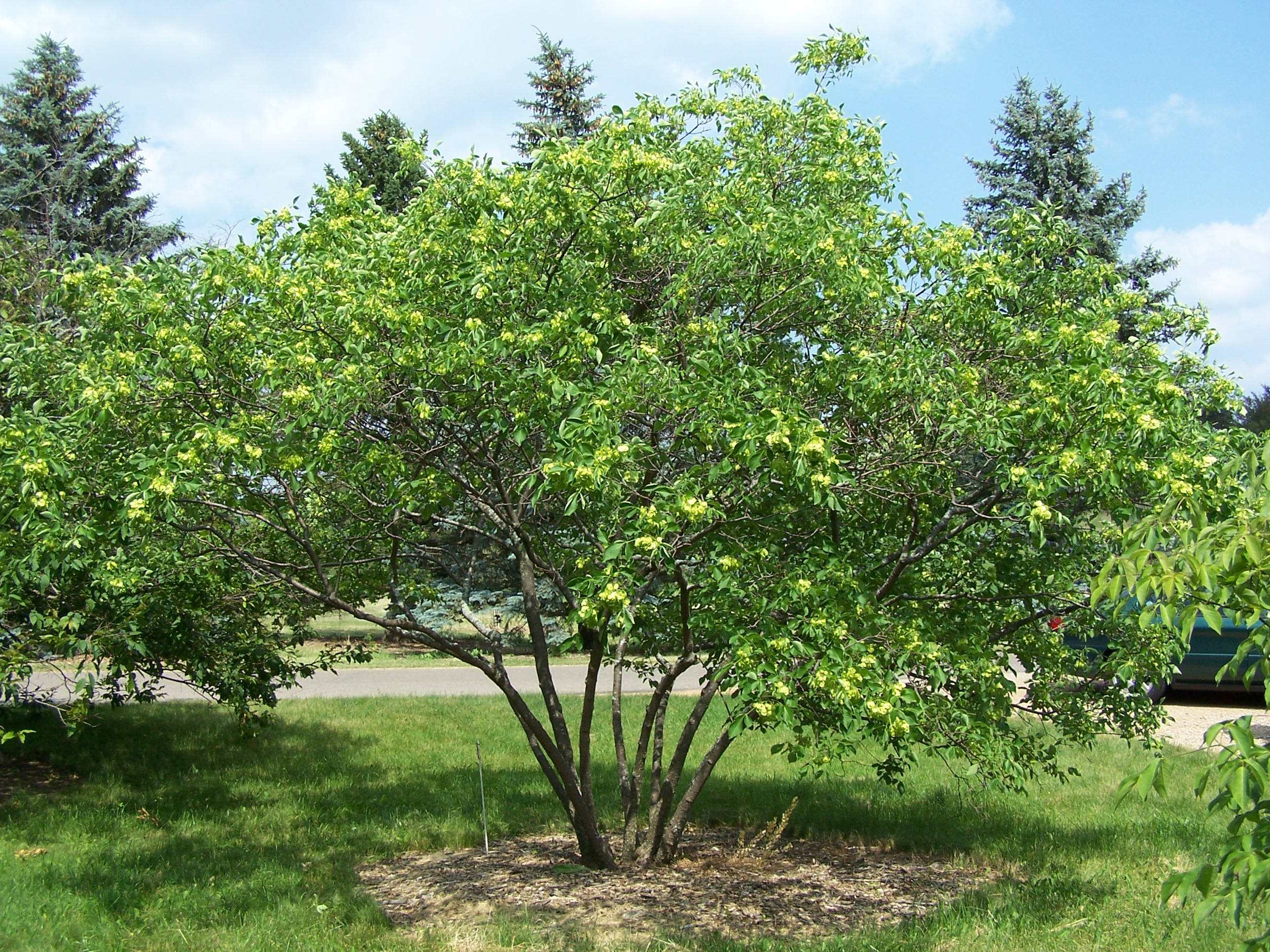
Multi-trunk tree form

== Taxonomy ==
While Ptelea trifoliata is most often treated as a single species with subspecies and/or varieties in different distribution ranges, some botanists treat the various hoptrees as a group of four or more closely related species:

- P. trifoliata subsp. trifoliata – common hoptree or eastern hoptree; eastern Canada & United States (U.S.), central U.S.
  - P. trifoliata subsp. trifoliata var. trifoliata – eastern Canada & (U.S.), central U.S.
  - P. trifoliata subsp trifoliata var. mollis Torr. & A. Gray – eastern and central U.S.
- P. trifoliata subsp. angustifolia (Benth.) V.L.Bailey – south-central U.S.
  - P. trifoliata subsp. angustifolia var. angustifolia (Benth.) M.E.Jones (P. angustifolia, P. lutescens) – narrowleaf hoptree; south-central U.S.
  - P. trifoliata subsp. angustifolia var. persicifolia (Greene) V.L.Bailey – south-central U.S.
- P. trifoliata subsp. pallida (Greene) V.L.Bailey – pallid hoptree, south-central and southwest U.S.
  - P. trifoliata subsp. pallida var. pallida (Greene) V.L.Bailey – southwest U.S.
  - P. trifoliata subsp. pallida var. cognata (Greene) Kearney & Peebles – southwest U.S.
  - P. trifoliata subsp. pallida var. confinis (Greene) V.L.Bailey – south-central and southwest U.S.
  - P. trifoliata subsp. pallida var. lutescens – southwest U.S.
- P. trifoliata subsp. polyadenia (Greene) V.L.Bailey – pallid hoptree, south-central and southwest U.S.
- P. trifoliata var. baldwinii (Torr. & A.Gray) D.B.Ward (P. baldwinii)

The specific epithet "trifoliata" refers to the three-parted compound leaf.

Other common names for this shrub include stinking prairie bush, Carolina shrub-trefoil, tree-trefoil, swamp dogwood, ague bark, paleleaf hoptree, prairie-grub, prickaway-anise, quinine tree, sang-tree, water-ash, western hoptree, wingseed, and woolly hoptree.

== Distribution and habitat ==
Ptelea trifoliata is native to North America, where its northern limits are in Ontario and Quebec, Canada. It is native through much of the eastern and southwestern United States, although it is absent from some areas of the Upper Midwest and is rare in much of New England. Its southern limits are in Mexico.

It has a wide-ranging natural habitat. In the Southeastern United States it is most often found in rocky forests, in both moist and dry soil, often associated with calcareous or mafic substrates. In the Midwest, habitats include forests, savannas, prairies, glades, and sand dunes. In Arizona it is common in canyons.

== Ecology ==
Larva of the giant swallowtail butterfly Papilio cresphontes feed on the leaves. Treehoppers of the genus Enchenopa infest the branches, laying white-frothy masses of eggs on the branch undersides. Several ant species tend to the treehoppers, including Camponotus pennsylvanicus, Formica montana, and Formica subsericea. Several bee species have been documented visiting the flowers of wafer ash, including Agapostemon virescens, Andrena commoda, Andrena crataegi, Andrena cressonii, Apis mellifera, Bombus auricomus, Bombus bimaculatus, Bombus impatiens, Ceratina calcarata, Ceratina dupla, Ceratina mikmaqi, and Lasioglossum imitatum.

== Uses ==
It has several Native American uses as a seasoning and as an herbal medicine for different ailments.

Numerous cultivars have been developed for ornamental use in parks and gardens. The cultivar 'Aurea' with golden leaves has gained the Royal Horticultural Society's Award of Garden Merit.

German immigrants to Texas in the 19th century used its seeds in place of hops in the beer-making process, lending the species its common name.
