= C16H26O =

The molecular formula C_{16}H_{26}O (molar mass: 234.38 g/mol, exact mass: 234.1984 u) may refer to:

- Callicarpenal
- Cassiffix
- Tetramethyl acetyloctahydronaphthalenes, also known as OTNE or Iso E Super
