= Ptelea aptera =

Conservation status
- Vulnerable (IUCN 3.1)

Scientific classification
- Kingdom: Plantae
- Clade: Tracheophytes
- Clade: Angiosperms
- Clade: Eudicots
- Clade: Rosids
- Order: Sapindales
- Family: Rutaceae
- Genus: Ptelea
- Species: P. aptera

Binomial name
- Ptelea aptera Parry

Synonyms
- Ptelea nucifera Greene; Ptelea obscura Greene; Taravalia aptera (Parry) Greene; Taravalia nucifera (Greene) Greene; Taravalia obscura (Greene) Greene

Species of plant

Ptelea aptera, the wingless ptelea, is a flowering shrub native to northwestern Baja California, Mexico. It grows up to 1-5 meters tall, and occurs in the mediterranean-climate shrubland and subtropical dry shrubland from sea level to 600 meters elevation. It is grows in association with species of Ceanothus, Fraxinus, Salvia, and Artemisia.

The IUCN Red List assesses the species as Vulnerable, and it is predicted to be at risk of extinction. It is neighbored by the more northern Ptelea crenulata, the western hoptree. It seemingly has the smallest distribution of the three species.
