= P. trifoliata =

P. trifoliata may refer to:

- Poncirus trifoliata, the trifoliate orange, a tree species native to northern China and Korea
- Ptelea trifoliata, the hoptree or wafer ash, a deciduous shrub or small tree species native to North America
