= Xenox nigritus =

Scientific classification
- Kingdom: Animalia
- Phylum: Arthropoda
- Clade: Pancrustacea
- Class: Insecta
- Order: Diptera
- Family: Bombyliidae
- Genus: Xenox
- Species: X. nigritus

Binomial name
- Xenox nigritus Fabricius, 1775

Synonyms
- Xenox nigrita (Fabricius, 1775)

Species of fly

Xenox nigritus, also known as Xenox nigrita, is a species of bee fly in the genus Xenox.

== Distribution ==
Xenox nigritus is native to The Americas, where it is found in Mexico, El Salvador, Costa Rica, and Colombia.
