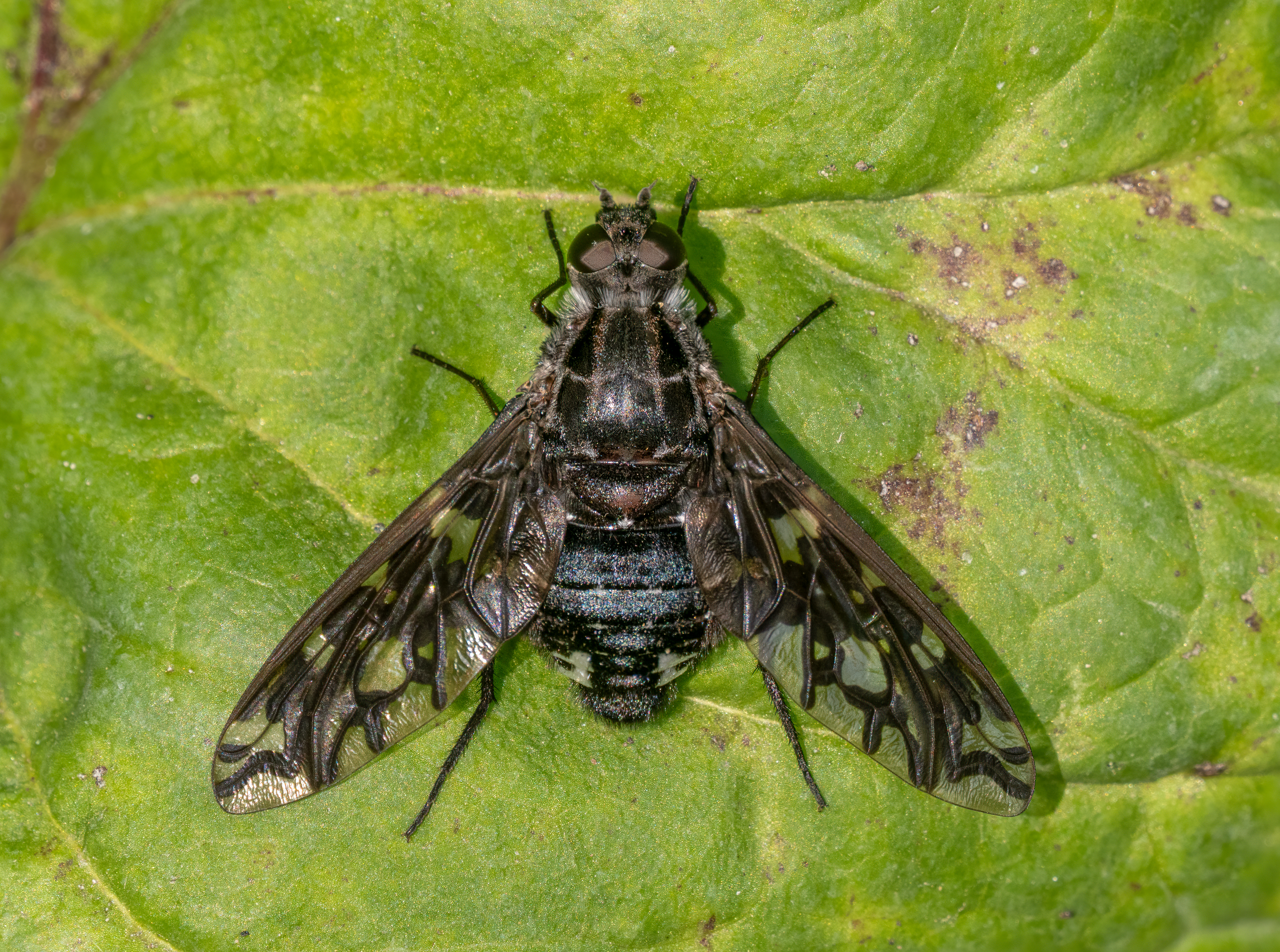

Scientific classification
- Kingdom: Animalia
- Phylum: Arthropoda
- Clade: Pancrustacea
- Class: Insecta
- Order: Diptera
- Family: Bombyliidae
- Genus: Xenox
- Species: X. tigrinus

Binomial name
- Xenox tigrinus (De Geer, 1776)

Synonyms
- Nemotelus tigrinus De Geer, 1776; Anthrax tigrinus (De Geer, 1776); Anthrax scripta Say, 1823

= Tiger bee fly =

Species of bee fly

Xenox tigrinus, commonly known as the tiger bee fly, is a species of bee fly in the family Bombyliidae. It is native to eastern North America and is found across the eastern United States and southern Ontario. The species is recognized by its large size and distinctive dark wing markings. Its larvae are parasitoids of carpenter bees, particularly the eastern carpenter bee, Xylocopa virginica.

== Taxonomy and naming ==
The species was described by Charles De Geer in 1776 as Nemotelus tigrinus and was later classified as Anthrax tigrinus. It is currently placed in the genus Xenox. The common name and specific epithet tigrinus refer to the species' tiger-like wing pattern.

== Description ==
Adults measure approximately 12–19 millimetres (0.47–0.75 in) in body length, excluding the wings, antennae, and legs. The body is predominantly black, while the transparent wings bear bold, irregular black markings that distinguish the species from other bee flies.

The tiger bee fly may initially be mistaken for a large bee because of its size, coloration, and hovering flight. Like other members of the order Diptera, however, it has only one functional pair of wings. Its bee-like appearance may discourage potential predators, while the fly itself cannot sting.

== Distribution ==
Xenox tigrinus occurs in southern Ontario and throughout much of the eastern United States. Its recorded range extends from Maine and Florida westward to parts of Iowa, Kansas, and Texas. Its distribution broadly overlaps that of its principal host, the eastern carpenter bee.

== Life cycle ==
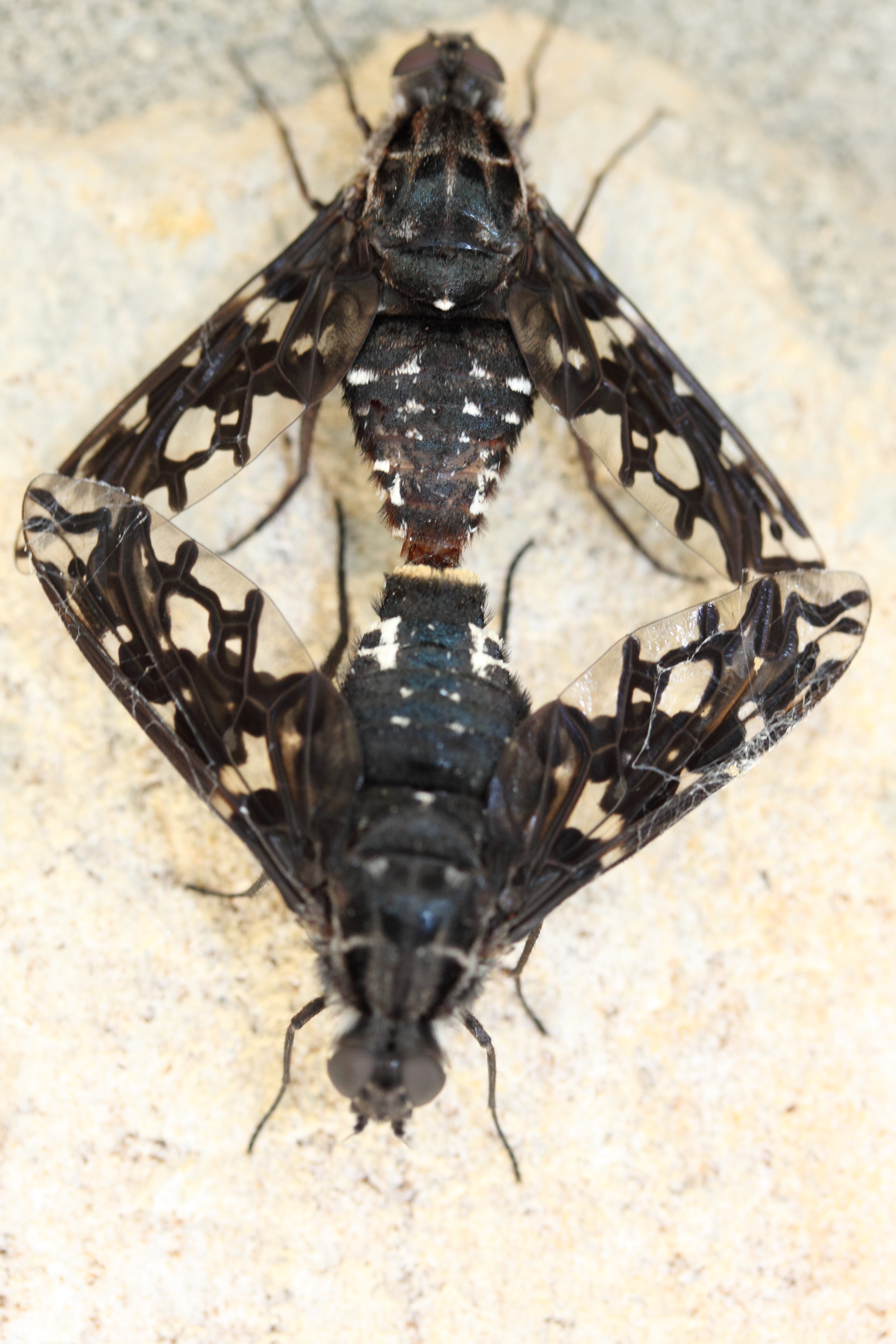
Two Xenox tigrinus mating

Female tiger bee flies locate active carpenter bee nests, which are often excavated in wooden structures. Rather than entering a nest tunnel, a female deposits eggs on or near the wooden surface surrounding its entrance.

After hatching, the fly larvae enter the nest and feed on the developing carpenter bee brood. Because the host is eventually killed, the relationship is more precisely described as parasitoidism rather than ordinary parasitism.

The eastern carpenter bee, Xylocopa virginica, is a documented host. In one study of its nest architecture and behavior, X. tigrinus was reported as its most common parasite.

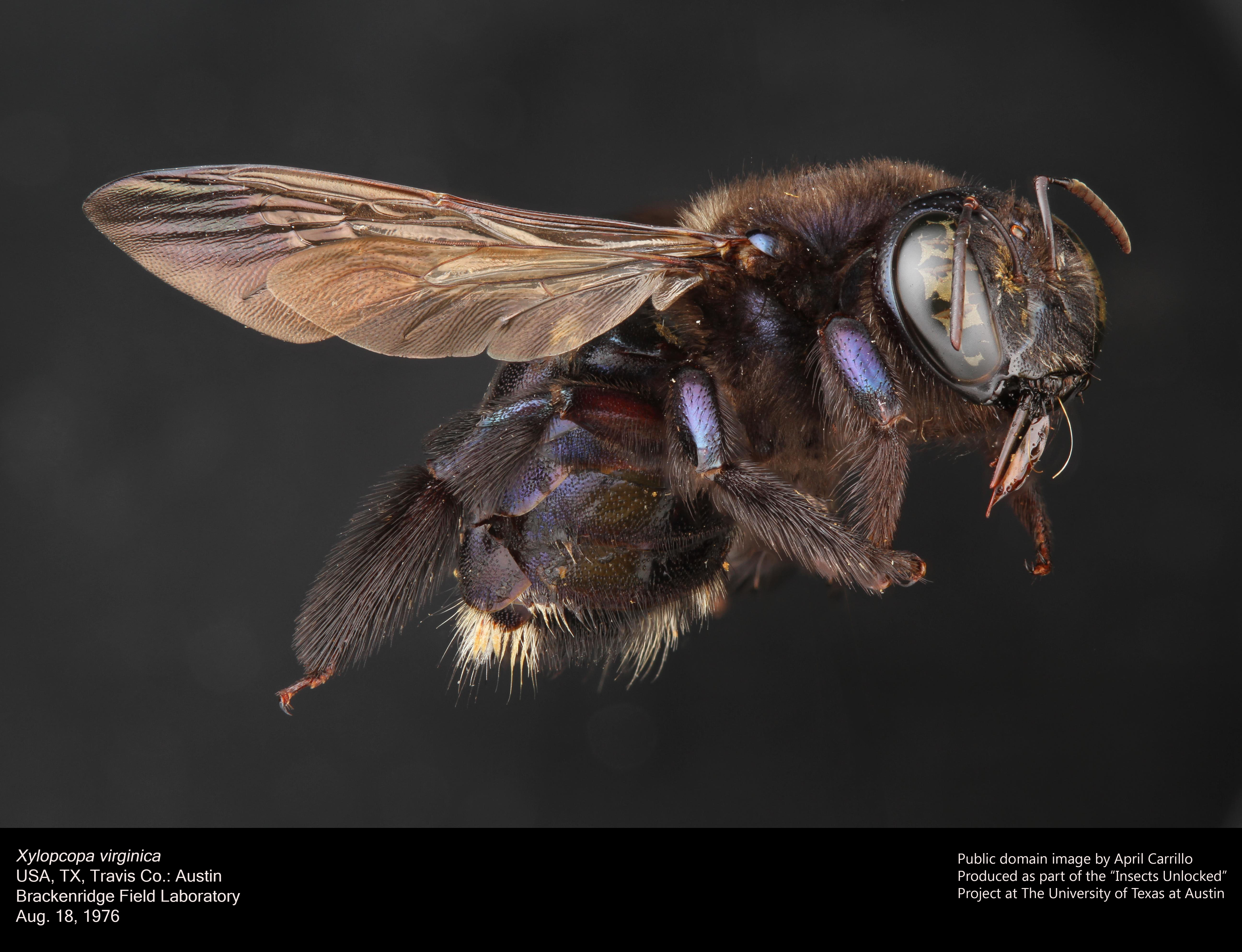
An eastern carpenter bee (Xylocopa virginica), a host of Xenox tigrinus

Adult tiger bee flies visit flowers and feed on nectar, meaning they may also contribute to pollination.

== Interactions with humans ==
Tiger bee flies are commonly observed hovering near wooden fences, roof overhangs, railings, and other structures containing carpenter bee nests. Although their appearance may seem intimidating, they neither bite nor sting humans. They do not excavate wood or damage structures; their presence usually results from carpenter bees already nesting nearby.
