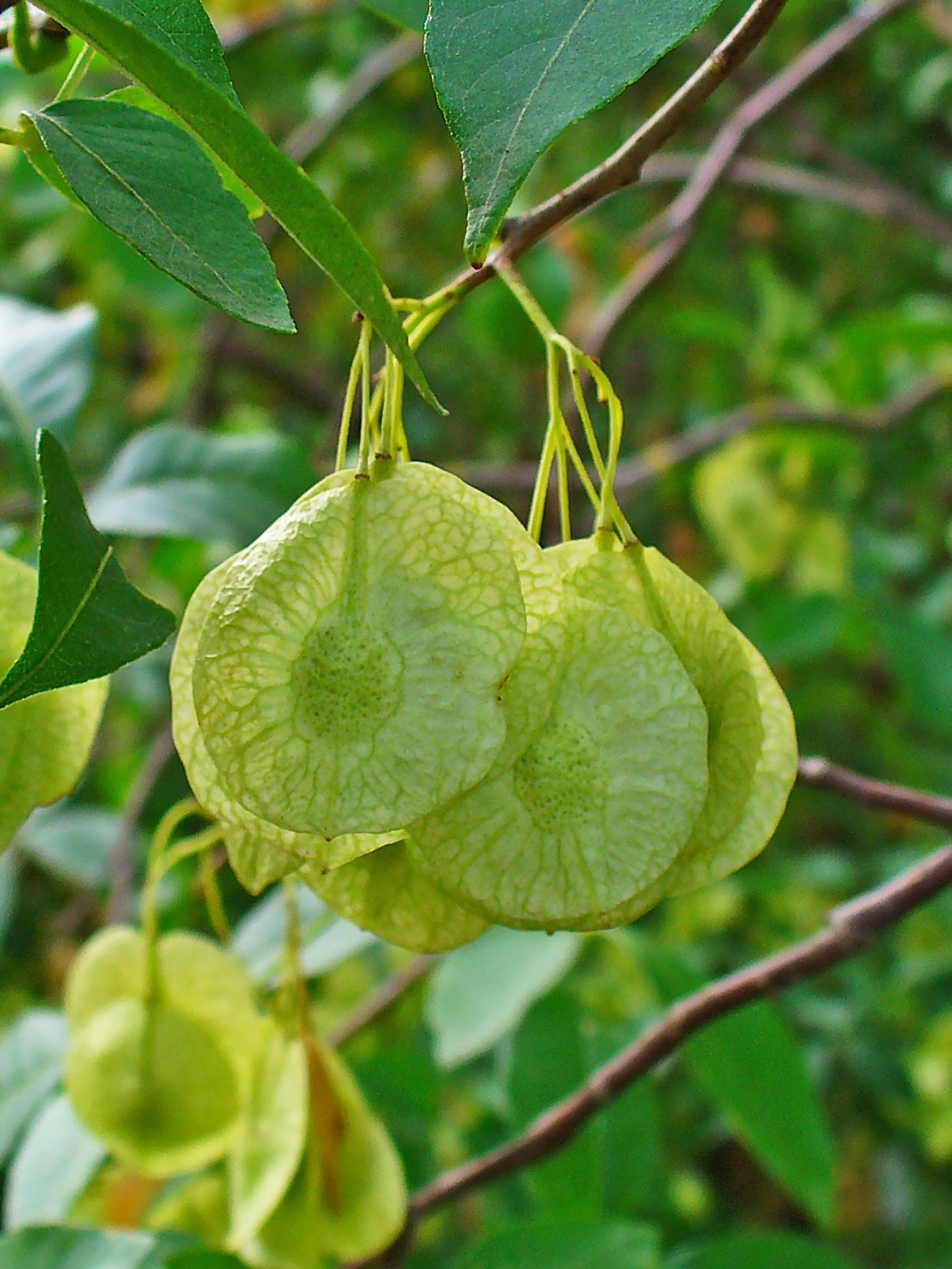
- Ptelea trifoliata

Scientific classification
- Kingdom: Plantae
- Clade: Tracheophytes
- Clade: Angiosperms
- Clade: Eudicots
- Clade: Rosids
- Order: Sapindales
- Family: Rutaceae
- Subfamily: Zanthoxyloideae
- Genus: Ptelea; L.

Synonyms
- Taravalia Greene

= Ptelea =

Genus of flowering plants

Ptelea is a genus of flowering plants in the citrus family, Rutaceae. The name, of Greek derivation, is the classical name of the elm tree. Carl Linnaeus used that word for this genus because of the resemblance of its fruit to that of the elm. Members of the genus are commonly known as hoptrees.

== Species ==
- Ptelea aptera Parry — Baja Californian ptelea (wingless ptelea)
- Ptelea crenulata Greene — California hoptree
- Ptelea trifoliata L. — common hoptree
  - Ptelea trifoliata subsp. angustifolia (Benth.) V.L.Bailey
  - Ptelea trifoliata subsp. coahuilensis (Greene) V.L.Bailey
  - Ptelea trifoliata f. fastigiata (Bean) Rehder
  - Ptelea trifoliata subsp. pallida (Greene) V.L.Bailey
  - Ptelea trifoliata subsp. polyadenia (Greene) V.L.Bailey
  - Ptelea trifoliata f. pubescens (Pursh) Voss
  - Ptelea trifoliata subsp. trifoliata

=== Formerly placed here ===
- Cliftonia monophylla (Lam.) Britton ex Sarg. (as P. monophylla Lam.)
- Dodonaea viscosa subsp. angustifolia (L.f.) J.G.West (as P. viscosa L.)
