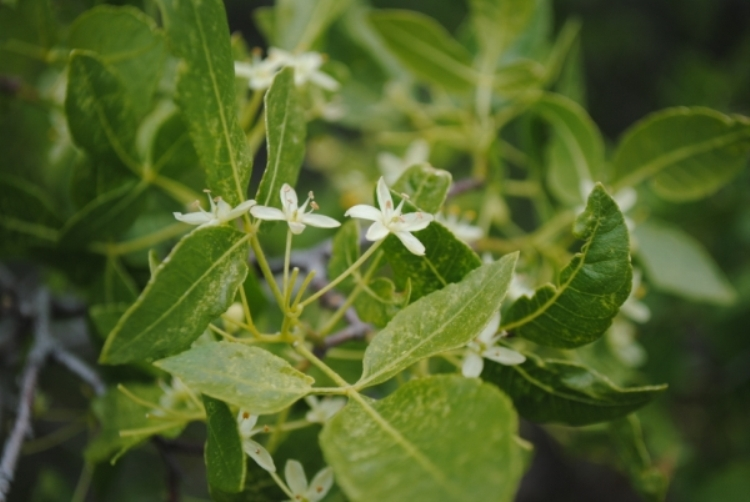

Scientific classification
- Kingdom: Plantae
- Clade: Tracheophytes
- Clade: Angiosperms
- Clade: Eudicots
- Clade: Rosids
- Order: Sapindales
- Family: Rutaceae
- Genus: Ptelea
- Species: P. crenulata

Binomial name
- Ptelea crenulata Greene
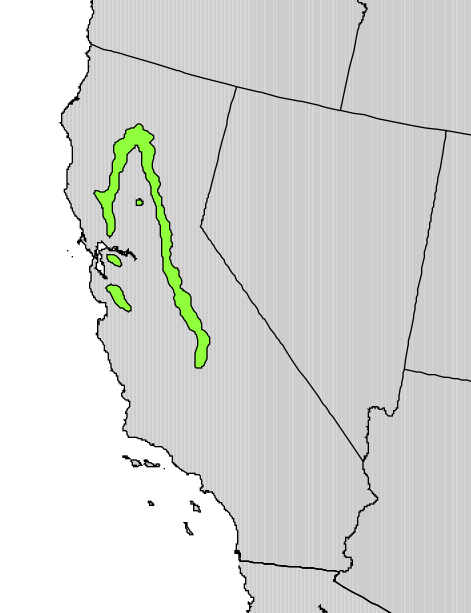
- Natural range

Synonyms
- P. trifoliata var. crenulata

= Ptelea crenulata =

Species of tree

Ptelea crenulata, commonly known as the California hoptree, is a species of tree that is endemic to the state of California in the United States. It is found in the western Sierra Nevada and southern Cascade Range foothills, the northern California Coast Ranges, and the San Francisco Bay Area.

The plant grows in chaparral and woodland habitats. It is cultivated by specialty California native plant nurseries as an ornamental plant for use as a shrub or small tree in water-conserving gardens, natural landscaping design, and habitat restoration projects.

Seedlings of Ptelea crenulata grow better in dry soil than in standing water, showing how well the species is adapted to California’s warm, dry climate. It also tends to have smaller leaves than its eastern relatives, a difference linked to growing in drier environments. The flowers give off a strong citrus-like scent that comes from natural compounds such as ethyl benzoate and estragole.
