= Xenox habrosus =

Scientific classification
- Kingdom: Animalia
- Phylum: Arthropoda
- Class: Insecta
- Order: Diptera
- Family: Bombyliidae
- Tribe: Anthracini
- Genus: Xenox
- Species: X. habrosus

Binomial name
- Xenox habrosus (Marston, 1970)

Synonyms
- Anthrax simson habrosus Marston, 1970

Species of fly

Xenox habrosus is a species of bee fly in the family Bombyliidae. It is found in Mexico, California, and Arizona.
