= Xenox delila =

Scientific classification
- Kingdom: Animalia
- Phylum: Arthropoda
- Class: Insecta
- Order: Diptera
- Family: Bombyliidae
- Tribe: Anthracini
- Genus: Xenox
- Species: X. delila

Binomial name
- Xenox delila (Loew, 1869)

Synonyms
- Argyramoeba delila Loew, 1869

Species of fly

Xenox delila is a species of bee fly in the family Bombyliidae. It is found in California and Baja California Norte.
