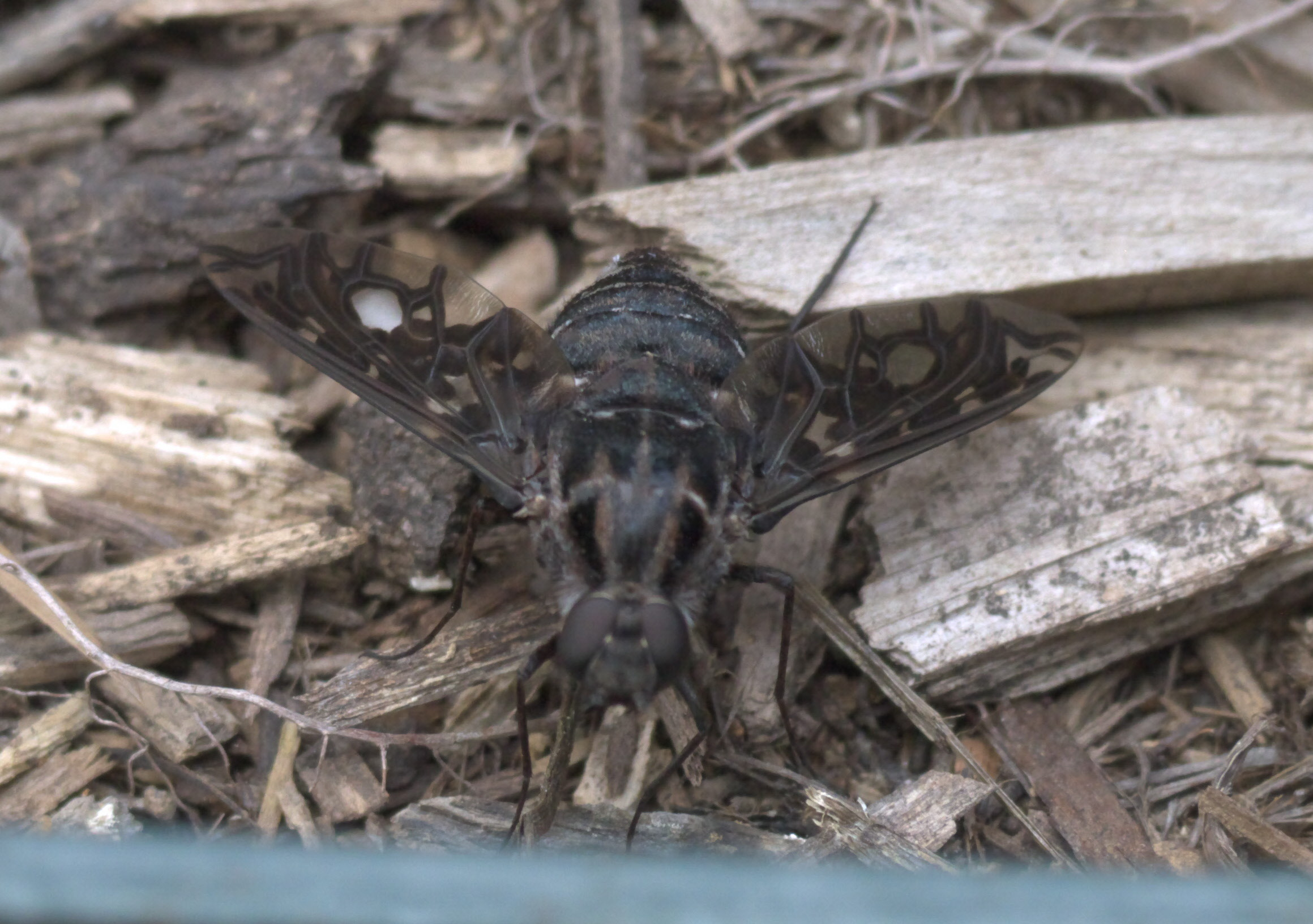
- Xenox tigrinus

Scientific classification
- Domain: Eukaryota
- Kingdom: Animalia
- Phylum: Arthropoda
- Class: Insecta
- Order: Diptera
- Family: Bombyliidae
- Subfamily: Anthracinae
- Tribe: Anthracini
- Genus: Xenox; Evenhuis, 1985

= Xenox =

Genus of flies

Xenox is a genus of bee flies in the family Bombyliidae. There are five described species in Xenox, all of which parasitize bees in the genus Xylocopa as larvae.

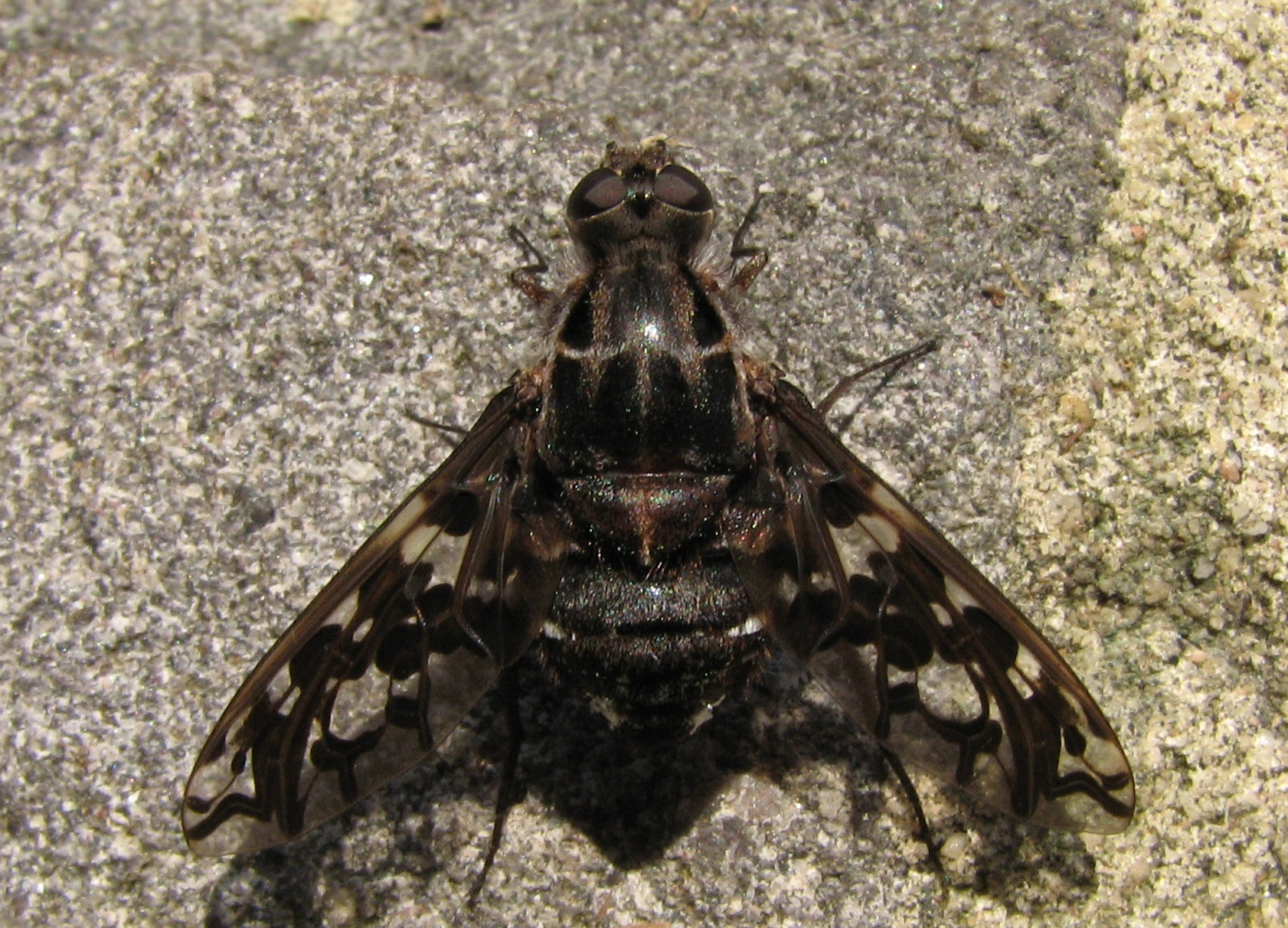
Xenox tigrinus

== Species ==
- Xenox delila (Loew, 1869)
- Xenox habrosus (Marston, 1970)
- Xenox nigritus (Fabricius, 1775)
- Xenox tigrinus (De Geer, 1776) (tiger bee fly)
- Xenox xylocopae (Marston, 1970)
