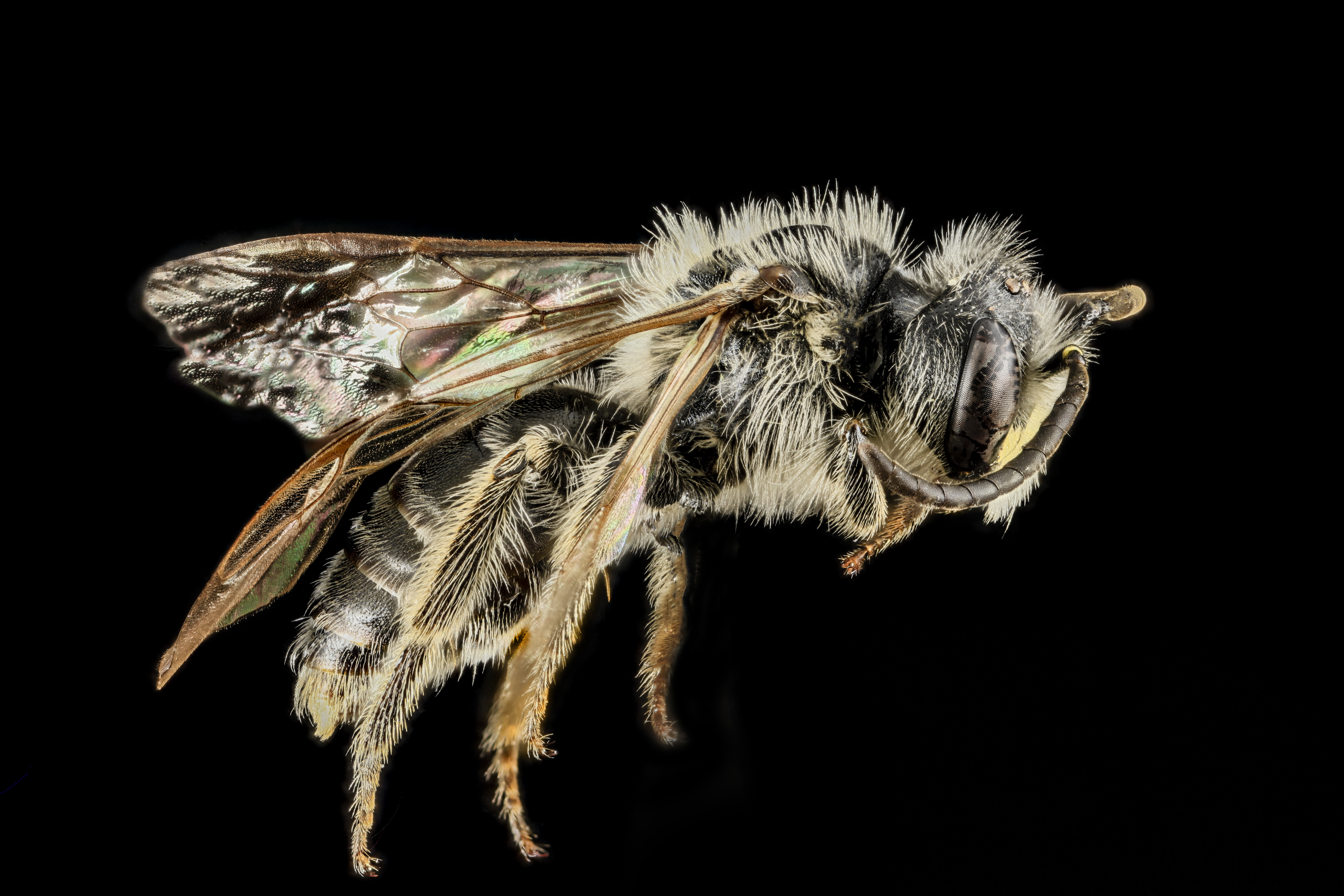

Scientific classification
- Domain: Eukaryota
- Kingdom: Animalia
- Phylum: Arthropoda
- Class: Insecta
- Order: Hymenoptera
- Family: Andrenidae
- Genus: Andrena
- Species: A. cressonii

Binomial name
- Andrena cressonii Robertson, 1891

= Andrena cressonii =

Species of bee

The dotted miner bee (Andrena cressonii) is a species of miner bee in the family Andrenidae. Another common name for this species is Cresson's andrena. It is found in North America.

== Subspecies ==
These three subspecies belong to the species Andrena cressonii:

- Andrena cressonii cressonii Robertson, 1891
- Andrena cressonii infasciata Lanham, 1949
- Andrena cressonii kansensis Cockerell, 1899
