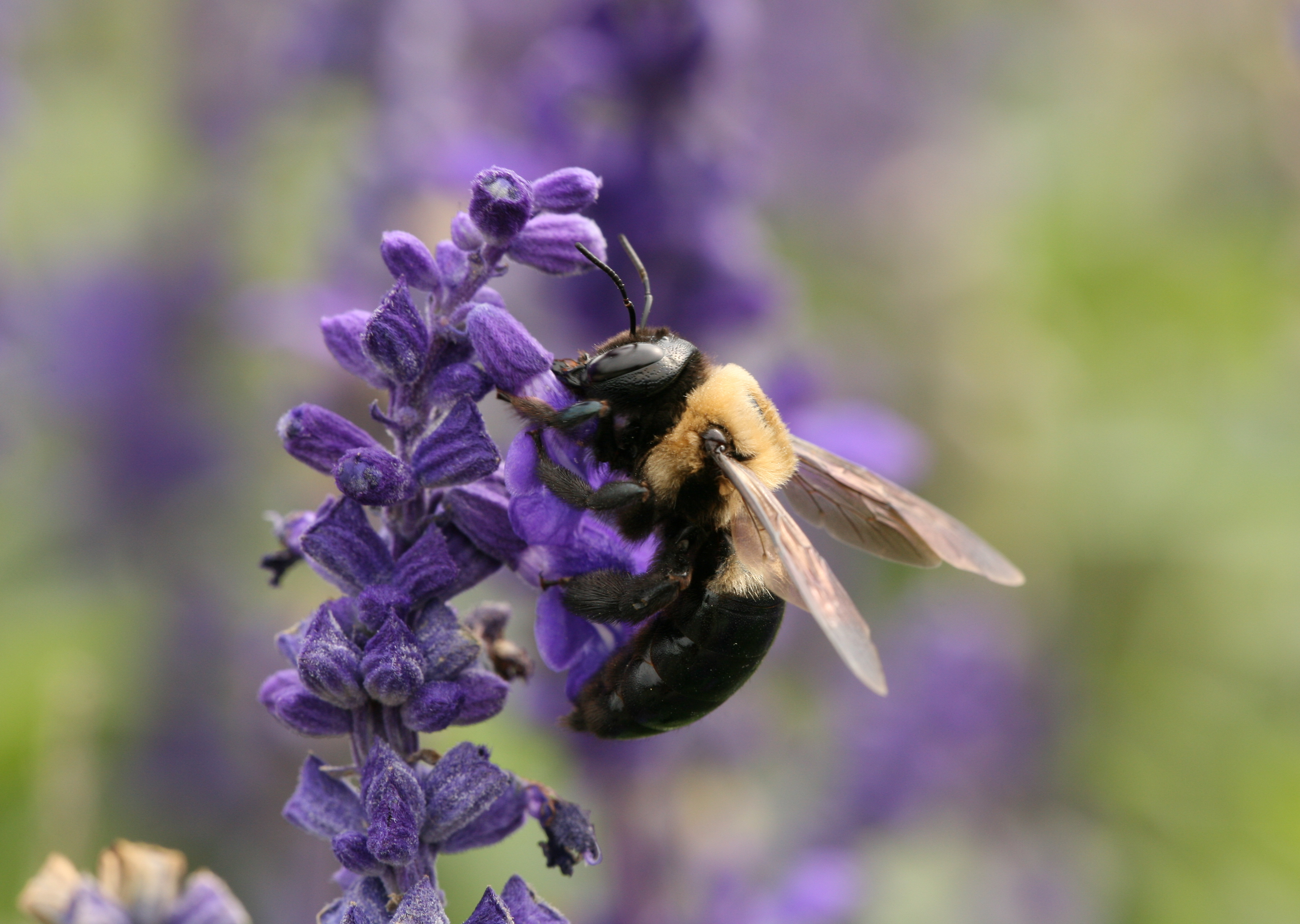
- Female Xylocopa virginica on Salvia

Scientific classification
- Kingdom: Animalia
- Phylum: Arthropoda
- Clade: Pancrustacea
- Class: Insecta
- Order: Hymenoptera
- Family: Apidae
- Genus: Xylocopa
- Species: X. virginica

Binomial name
- Xylocopa virginica Linnaeus, 1771

Subspecies
- X. v. krombeini; X. v. texana; X. v. virginica

= Eastern carpenter bee =

Species of insect

Xylocopa virginica, sometimes referred to as the eastern carpenter bee, is a species of bee that extends through the eastern United States and into Canada. It is sympatric with Xylocopa micans in much of southeastern United States. It nests in various types of wood and eats pollen and nectar.

In X. virginica, dominant females do not focus solely on egg-laying, as in other bee species considered to have "queens". Instead, dominant X. virginica females are responsible for a full gamut of activities including reproduction, foraging, and nest construction, whereas subordinate bees may engage in little activity outside of guarding the nest.

== Description and identification ==
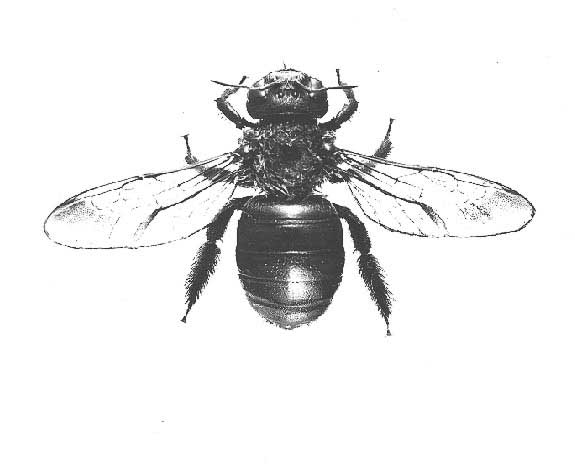
Female X. virginica

The bee is similar in size to bumblebees, but has a glossy, mostly black body with a slight metallic purple tint. X. virginica males and females have generally the same mass, but can be differentiated visually by the male's longer body and the female's wider head. The males also have a white spot on their face. Additionally, the males have larger thoracic volumes for given masses. Females of different social standing can also be told apart based on morphology. Primary females are larger than secondary or tertiary females, and also have more mandibular and wing wear.

X. virginica have distinctive maxillae that are adapted to performing perforations on corolla tubes to reach nectaries. Their maxillae are sharp and wedge-shaped, allowing them to split the side of corolla tubes externally to access the nectar. Eastern carpenter bees also have galeae on their maxillae that are shaped like large, flat blades. Bees with sharp galeae can use these to further aid in penetrating the corolla tubes.

== Taxonomy and phylogeny ==
The primary difference in the appearances of a bumblebee and X. virginica is the conspicuously shining black abdomen.

X. virginica belongs to the genus Xylocopa, which consists of over 400 species worldwide, in the subgenus Xylocopoides, which contains only five New World species, including Xylocopa californica, which also occurs in the U.S.

== Distribution ==
X. virginica is found throughout much of North America east of the Rocky Mountains and at least as far north as Nebraska, southern Ontario, and Maine.

== Nesting ==
X. virginica build their nests in wood, bamboo culms, agave stalks, and other comparable materials, but they prefer to nest in milled pine or cedar lumber. The nests are built by scraping wood shavings off of the wall. These shavings are then used to create partitions between nesting cells. The entrance cuts into the wood perpendicular to the grain, but they are built parallel beyond the entrance. These nests may be either social, containing groups of two to five females, or solitary. Social nests are more common, despite the fact that brood productivity is actually lower when females choose to nest together. Because X. virginica builds its nests in wood structures, it is common for it to nest in constructed furniture or buildings. X. virginica is the most common large carpenter bee in eastern North America, and it nests in small groups, so nests are fairly commonly encountered.

The nests are usually round and typically have one to four tunnels. They have multiple branches, with each adult female living and laying eggs in a separate branch but females sharing one common entrance. Because the nests are costly to build, it is common for females to reuse old nests.

== Life cycle ==
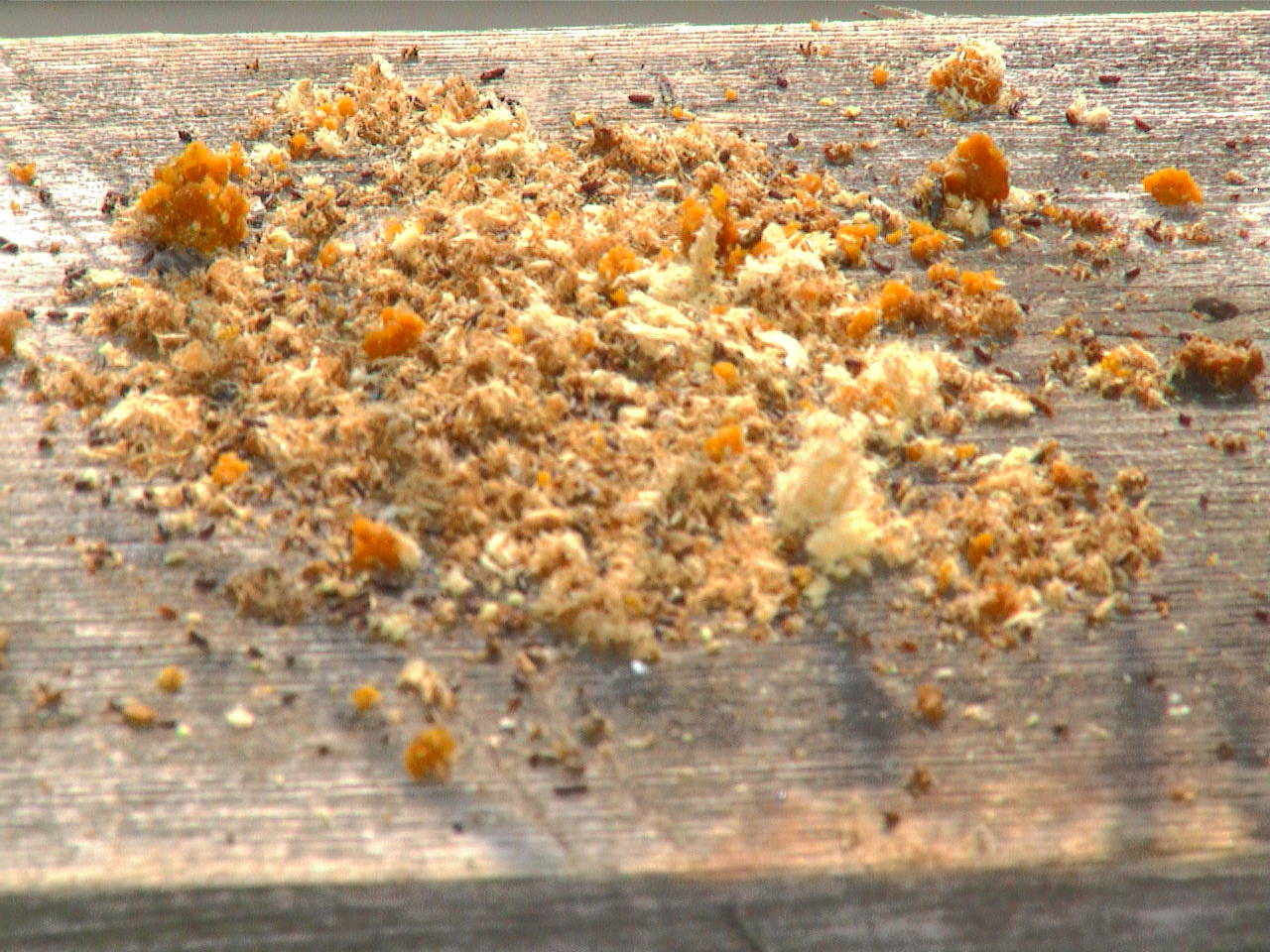
The female bee pushes castings out of the entranceway and maintains the hibernaculum.

In X. virginica, mating occurs only once a year, in the spring. Eggs are laid in July, starting farthest from the exit hole, and by about August and mid-September, larval development has completed and all the pupae have become adults. Researchers suggest that there is a mechanism that synchronizes the emergence time of young that are laid at different times by causing the younger eggs to develop faster. This mechanism prevents bees that would emerge sooner from removing their siblings and decreasing their potential competition.

Bees that have newly emerged have a soft cuticle and white wings. The wings later transition to brown, then to a bluish black. They can fly 3–4 days after emergence, but they remain in their nest for at least two weeks, consuming nectar but not pollen. The juveniles begin the next mating cycle the following spring, so one generation develops in a year.

Females begin to exhibit signs of senescence around July. The indicative behavior includes resting in flowers, remaining in the nest, or even just falling to the ground from flight. Older individuals also crawl, avoid taking flight, and do not struggle when handled by humans. The old bees die by early August, the same time that juveniles emerge from brood cells. Due to the simultaneous nature of expiration of old bees and emergence of new ones, there is little overlap between generations, except for some females that survive a second winter.

== Behavior ==
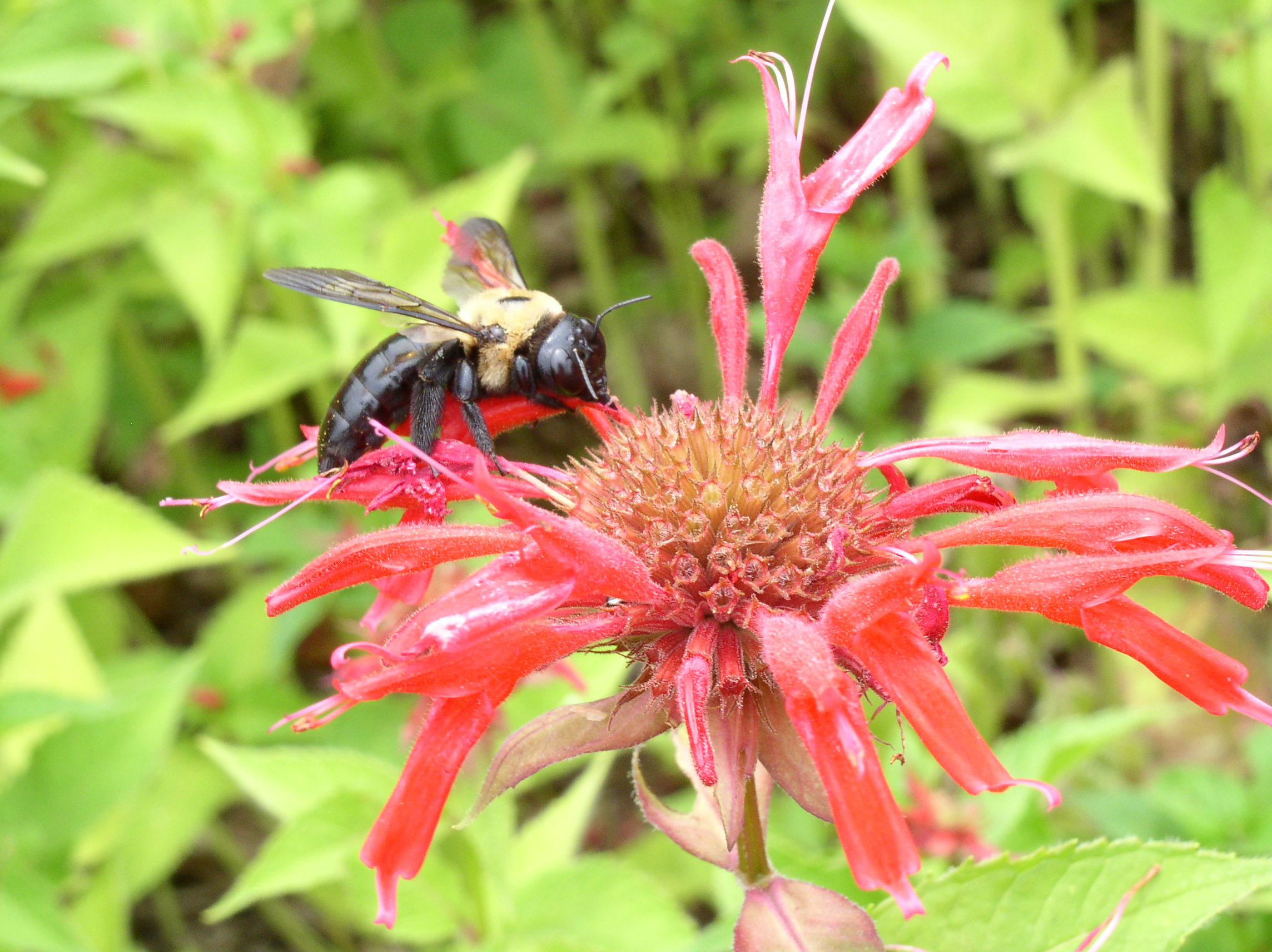
X. virginica engaged in “nectar robbing” (visiting a Monarda flower without making contact with its anthers)

X. virginica is not a solitary bee species, but it is not truly social either. The weak form of sociality it exhibits, with one female doing the majority of the work and caring for her sisters, may be a transitional step in the evolution of sociality.

=== Dominance hierarchy ===
Female X. virginica can have solitary nests, but usually nests in social groups. The social order of X. virginica is broken into three groups: primary, secondary, and tertiary. Primary females act as dominant within a nest and are in charge of reproduction, providing food for the larvae, and laying all the eggs. This is different from many bee species in which there is a queen that focuses her energy solely on laying eggs while relying on provisions provide by subordinate bees. Secondary females may sometimes participate in oviposition, and reinforce this potential role by helping provide for the larvae or performing nest maintenance. Tertiary females rely on the provisions provided by primary females and quietly await overwintering while remaining inactive.

Studies have shown that primary females are usually the bees that have overwintered twice, while tertiary bees have only overwintered once. Tertiary bees will most likely survive a second overwintering and develop further to become primary females the following year. Secondary bees may survive a second winter, but that is unlikely if they actively forage after their first overwintering.

=== Division of labor among the sexes ===
Not all females do the same work in a social nest. This is evident based on the varying levels of wear on the wings and mandibles of females of various social standing. Although many nests have more than one female, there is a division of labor between the older and younger females. During nesting time, only the older females are responsible for nesting duties such as digging, excavating the cells, lining the cells, collecting food, and ovipositing. Evidence of this activity can be found in their worn mandibles. Young females rarely leave the nest and guard the entrance while the older females work, resulting in unworn wings and mandibles in the younger females. Additionally, X. virginica is the only known species in which one-year-old females cohabit the nest with two-year-old females that do all the labor.

Males often spend long periods of time hovering, flying, or in fast pursuit of intruders, while female flight activity is usually very directed, such as flights to flowers and food sites. Larger females have an advantage because they can carry larger amounts of pollen or nectar back to the nest and can fly longer distances.

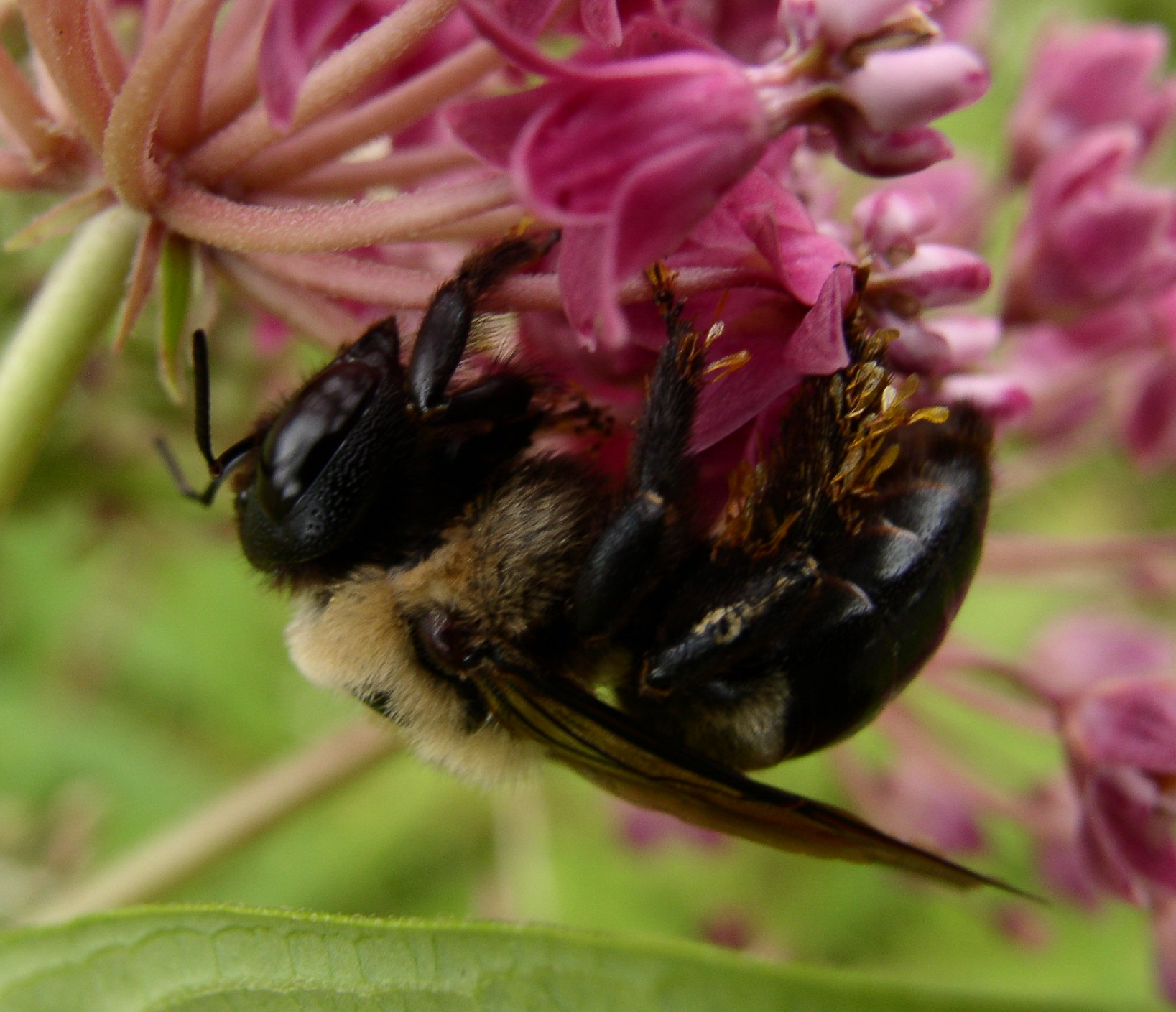
X. virginica on milkweed (Asclepias) flower, carrying pollinia

=== Diet ===
X. virginica survives mostly on nectar and pollen. Newly emerged bees do not have food stored in their nests, but are occasionally brought nectar.

X. virginica uses its maxillae to penetrate the corolla of some long-tubed flowers, reaching their nectar stores without making contact with the anthers and thus bypassing pollination. In some plants this “nectar robbing” reduces fruit production and seed number. In others, defensive mechanisms allow pollination to occur despite perforation of the corolla.

== Mating behavior ==
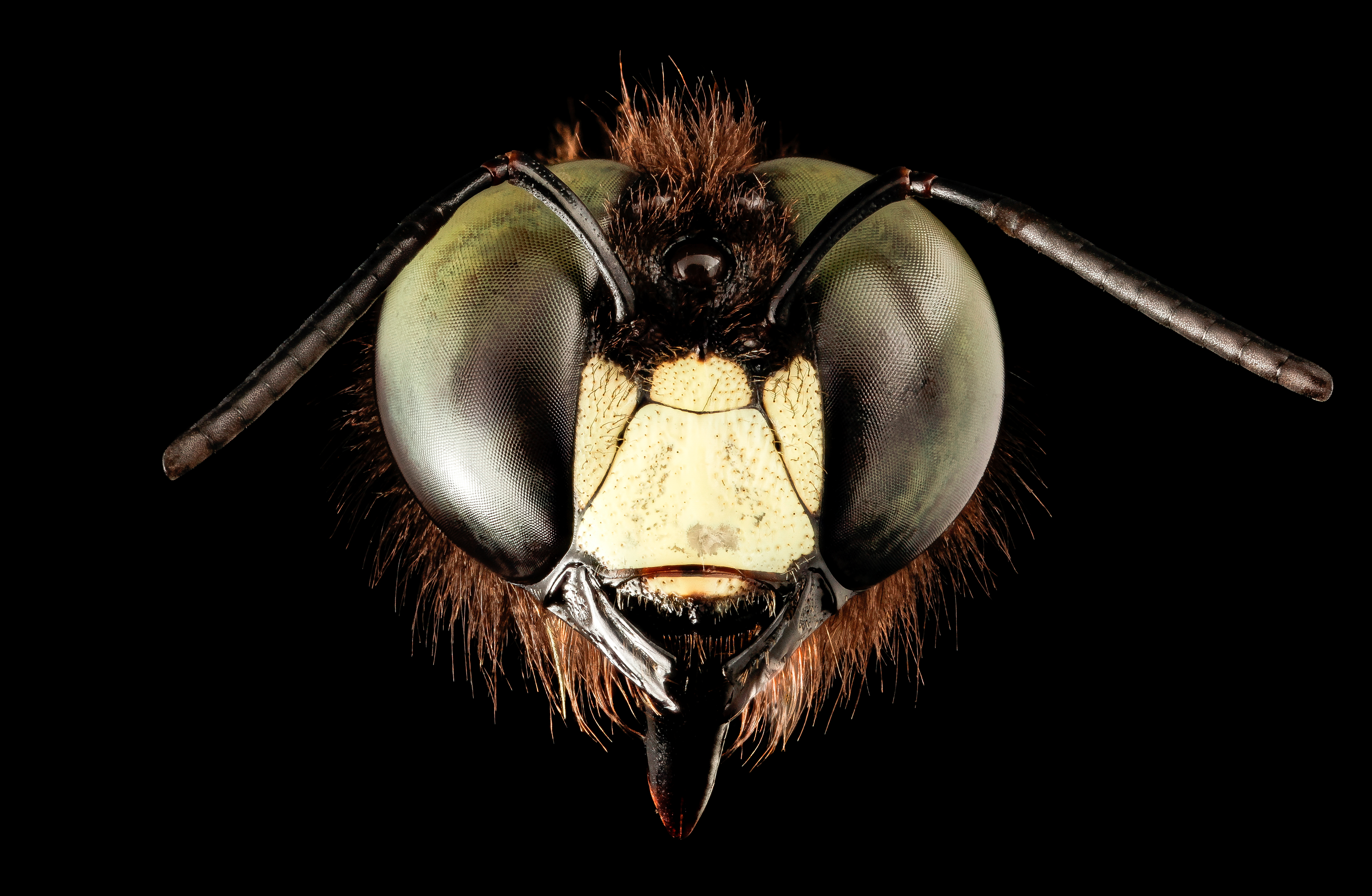
Male X. virginica

Each nest usually has one mated individual. Mating occurs in April and is often accompanied by a bobbing dance that involves about a dozen males and only a few females.

Males require female activity, specifically flight, in mating. Occasionally before mating, the couple will face each other and hover for a few minutes. When the male contacts the female, he mounts her back and attempts to push his abdomen under hers. Copulation then occurs, and it is almost always followed by more mating attempts. If, during copulation, the female lands, the couple will disengage and the male will hover waiting for the female to take flight again; however, although the males almost always disengage and pause copulation when the female lands, there have been instances recorded in which the males will hold on to the female with all six legs and flap his wings in an attempt to lift her back into the air.

Larger males are usually more successful in mating. Because of their competitive advantage due to their size, males will likely claim a territory near female nest sites. Smaller males will stay at foraging sites or other areas they think females may pass so they can mate with reduced competition.

== Kin selection ==
Research has shown that, regardless of sex, X. virginica show more aggression toward non-nestmates than nestmates, indicating that they can recognize each other. By living in social groups with inclusive fitness, the bees can raise offspring with the help of the nest community rather than as a solitary effort.

The ability of X. virginica to recognize nestmates allows primaries and secondaries to exclude tertiary bees from their nests. Tertiary bees are a burden on resources because they do not perform any useful activities, but they benefit from the food and shelter provided by the primary females.

== Defense ==
=== Territorial behavior in males ===
Males will establish territories near an active nest entrance to protect the colony and seek mating opportunities. For males that are near the nest entrance, their boundaries are usually linear and several meters long. For males that are farther from the exit, their boundaries are usually in the shape of a square and shorter in length. Males can stay in one territory for as long as two weeks. Although they do most of their foraging and resting during the night, they take small breaks throughout the day as well. After these breaks, they often have to fight off intruders that have taken advantage of their absence.

Flights near the nest are usually uniform and involve much hovering. Flights protecting a bee's territory can be as short as a few minutes, but may extend beyond an hour. Males will not react to another bee unless the other is flying at high speed. When other individuals hover near the nest, it is unlikely that the male will pursue, whereas if another male comes into a territory at a high speed, the territorial male will give chase. When males patrolling the entrance of a nest are confronted with either dead or living Eastern carpenter bees suspended from a thread and dangled within the male's territory, the male does not respond when the bee is suspended and motionless, whether it is living or dead—even though X. virginica are capable of recognizing other individuals of their species. However, when the suspended bee is released and allowed to fly in the male's territory or is swung through the territory on the thread, the territorial male pursues it.

=== Parasites ===
There is one common species of bombyliid flies known to parasitize the larvae of Xylocopa virginica: Xenox tigrinus.

=== Marking ===
Eastern carpenter bees have mandibular glands that are known to produce a marking chemical in X. hirsutissima that functions as a nest marker or for female attraction. The glands are present in both males and females, but they produce no marking substance. However, X. virginica does have a Dufour's gland that is used to deposit a scent on a flower immediately following nectar collection. The scent, composed of hydrocarbons and esters, discourages X. virginica, as well as other bee species, from returning to that same flower.

=== Stinging ===
The male bee is unable to sting because the stinger is simply a modified ovipositor (which males lack by definition), though they will commonly approach human beings and buzz loudly around them or fly close to them. The female, on the other hand, is capable of stinging; while the pain level of these stings is not well-documented, researchers have testified that X. virginica will sting if roughly handled. As the stinger is not barbed, a female can sting multiple times.

== Human importance ==
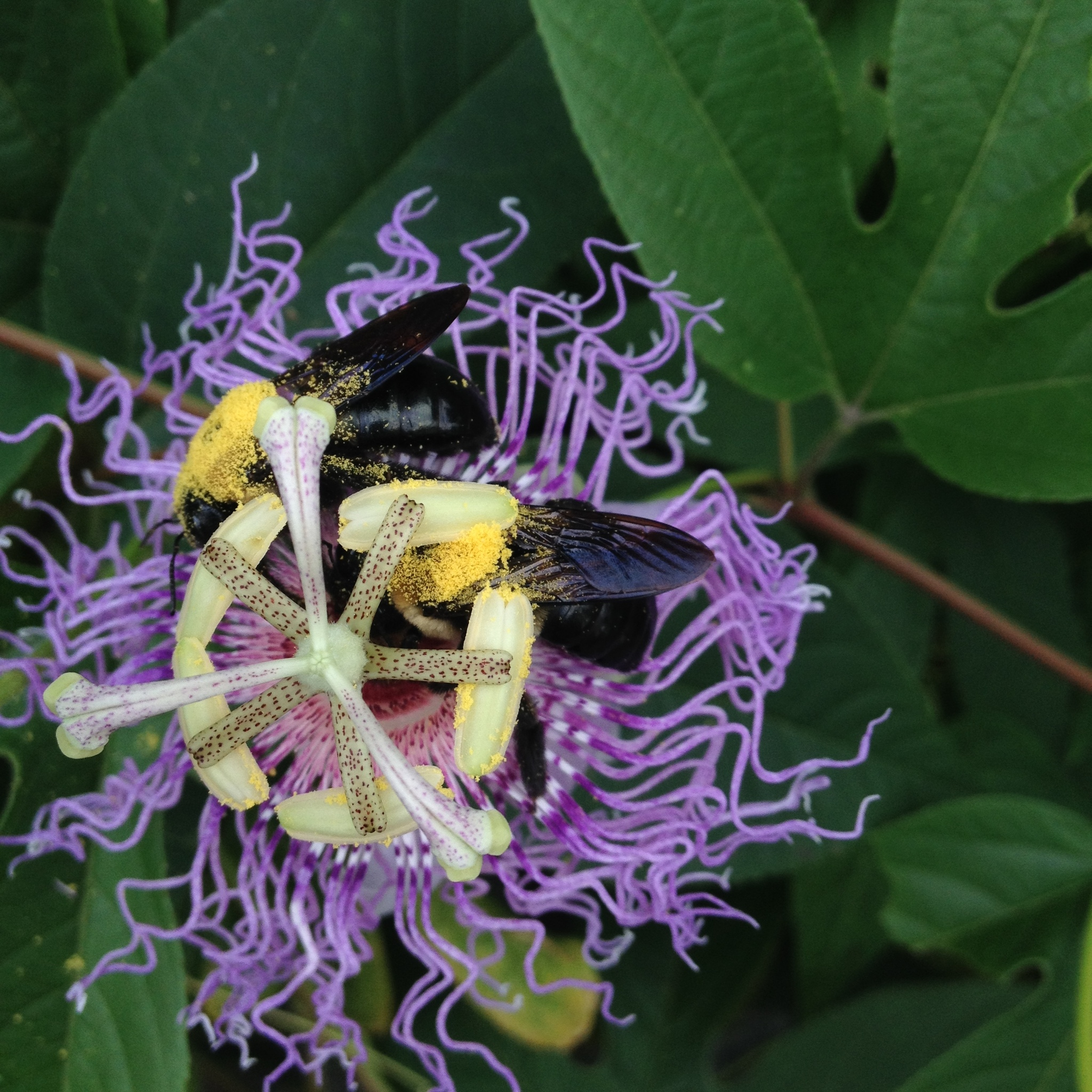
Pollinating purple passionflower

=== Agriculture ===
X. virginica gathers pollen and nectar to bring back to the nest for larvae from many different kinds of flower. Most are wild grown or decorative; however, it can be a good pollinator of commercial crops, such as the blueberry. Its active seasons are quite long, and it forages on a wide variety of plant species. Also, because the start of its seasonal activity is temperature dependent, it is easy for greenhouse workers to manipulate the beginning of foraging activity. However, in comparison to species such as the honey bee, the species’ smaller nest makes it less powerful as a pollinator.

=== Destructive behavior ===
Because X. virginica builds its nests in various types of wood, it presents the disadvantage of damaging wood in manmade structures. It also excretes excrement upon exiting its tunnel that may aesthetically disfigure the sides of buildings. Although X. virginica is secondary as a pollinator to the honey bee, its contribution is great enough to offset some of its destructive tendencies. X. virginica avoids material that is painted white, which is a possible solution to keeping it out of unwanted areas.
