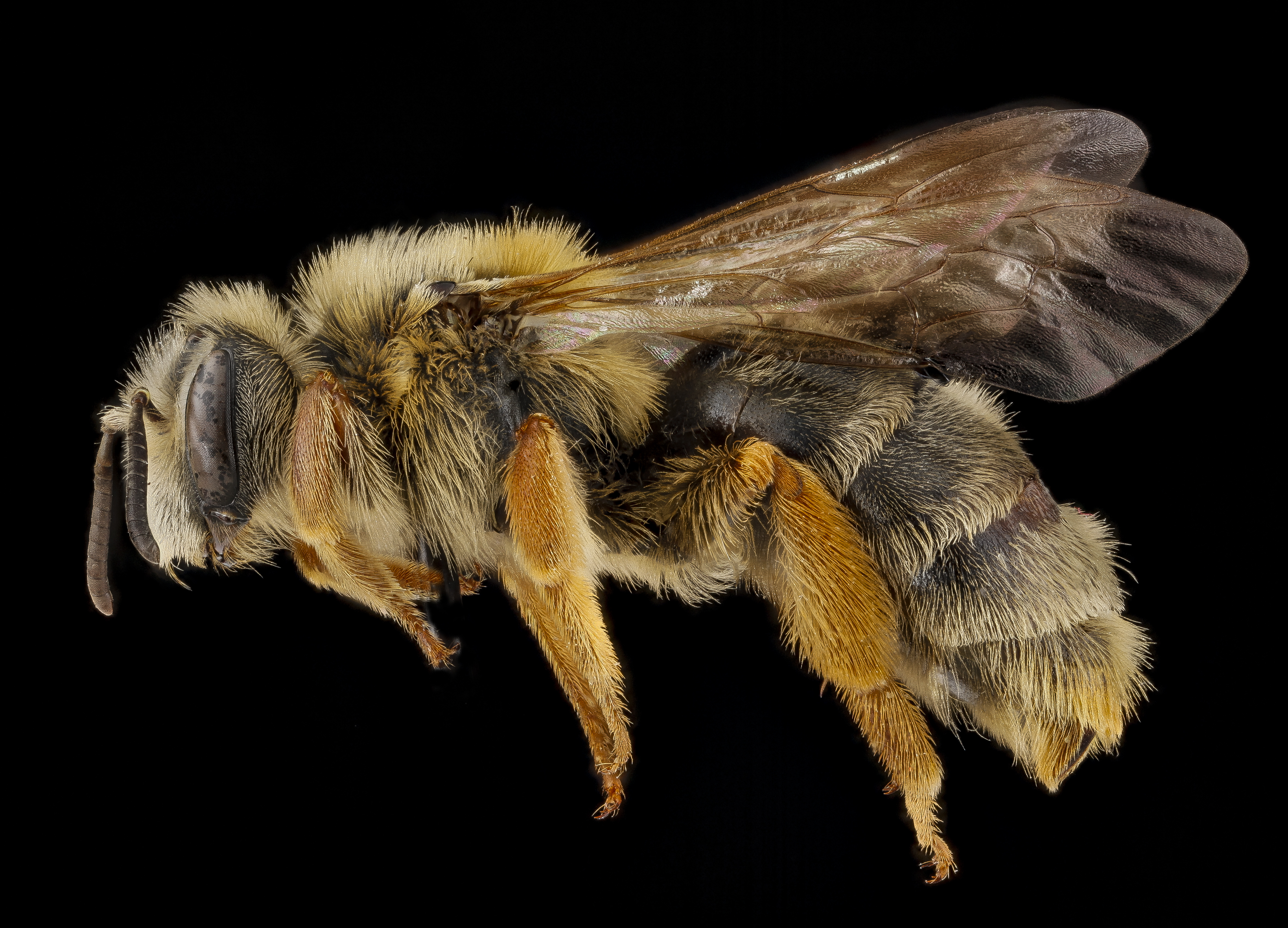

Scientific classification
- Domain: Eukaryota
- Kingdom: Animalia
- Phylum: Arthropoda
- Class: Insecta
- Order: Hymenoptera
- Family: Andrenidae
- Genus: Andrena
- Species: A. commoda

Binomial name
- Andrena commoda Smith, 1879

= Andrena commoda =

Miner bee species in the family Andrenidae

The advantaged miner bee (Andrena commoda) is a species of miner bee in the family Andrenidae. It is found in North America.
