= Callicarpenal =

Names
- IUPAC name 3α-Methyl-14a-homo-12-nor-5β,10α-drim-8-en-14a-al
- Systematic IUPAC name [(1S,2R,4aR,8aR)-1,2,4a,5-Tetramethyl-1,2,3,4,4a,7,8,8a-octahydronaphthalen-1-yl]acetaldehyde
- Other names (−)-Callicarpenal; 13,14,15,16-Tetranor-3-cleroden-12-al

Identifiers
CAS Number	161105-12-0
3D model (JSmol)	Interactive image
ChemSpider	9282422
PubChem CID	11107286
UNII	HX4WCL7DPK
CompTox Dashboard (EPA)	DTXSID00455470
- InChI: InChI=1S/C16H26O/c1-12-6-5-7-14-15(12,3)9-8-13(2)16(14,4)10-11-17/h6,11,13-14H,5,7-10H2,1-4H3/t13-,14+,15+,16+/m1/s1 Key: MPWIIQYWQOBNKS-UGUYLWEFSA-N; InChI=1/C16H26O/c1-12-6-5-7-14-15(12,3)9-8-13(2)16(14,4)10-11-17/h6,11,13-14H,5,7-10H2,1-4H3/t13-,14+,15+,16+/m1/s1 Key: MPWIIQYWQOBNKS-UGUYLWEFBV
- SMILES: O=CC[C@@]2([C@@H]1[C@](/C(=C\CC1)C)(CC[C@H]2C)C)C

Properties
Chemical formula	C_{16}H_{26}O
Molar mass	234.383 g·mol^{−1}
- Except where otherwise noted, data are given for materials in their standard state (at 25 °C [77 °F], 100 kPa). Infobox references

Callicarpenal is a terpenoid that has been isolated from plants of the genus Callicarpa (beautyberry). It acts as an insect repellent against mosquitoes (Aedes aegypti and Anopheles stephensi) and fire ants. It also has activity against ticks (Ixodes scapularis and Amblyomma americanum).

In comparison to the most commonly used insect repellent, DEET, callicarpenal is only about 21% less effective at preventing mosquito bites.

Callicarpenal was discovered by scientists at the United States Department of Agriculture's Agricultural Research Service who were inspired by reports that Callicarpa americana (American beautyberry) was used as a folk remedy to prevent mosquito bites.
