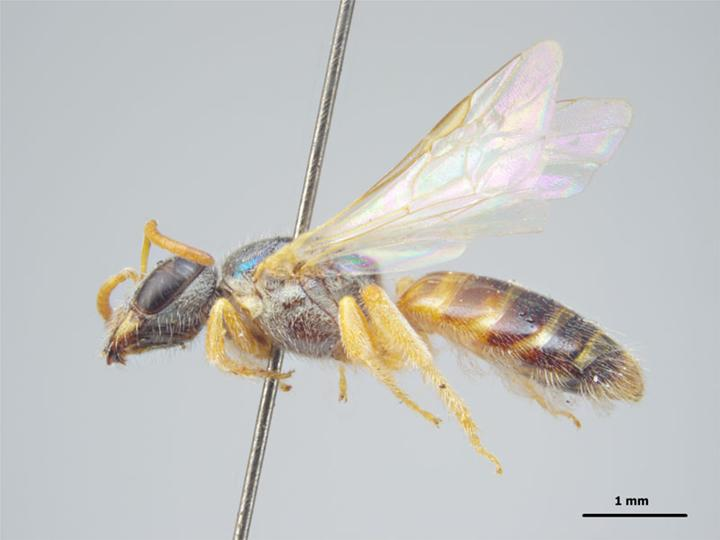

Scientific classification
- Domain: Eukaryota
- Kingdom: Animalia
- Phylum: Arthropoda
- Class: Insecta
- Order: Hymenoptera
- Family: Halictidae
- Tribe: Halictini
- Genus: Lasioglossum
- Species: L. imitatum

Binomial name
- Lasioglossum imitatum (Smith, 1853)

= Lasioglossum imitatum =

Species of sweat bee

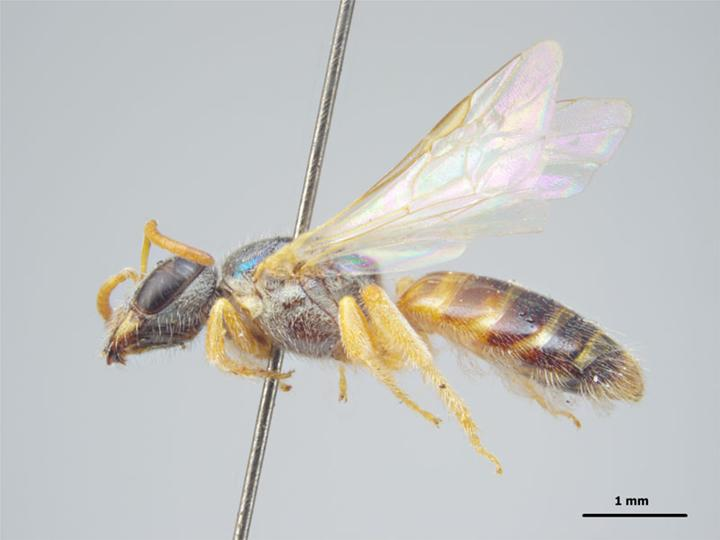

Lasioglossum imitatum is a species of sweat bee in the family Halictidae. It is known as the bristle sweat bee.
