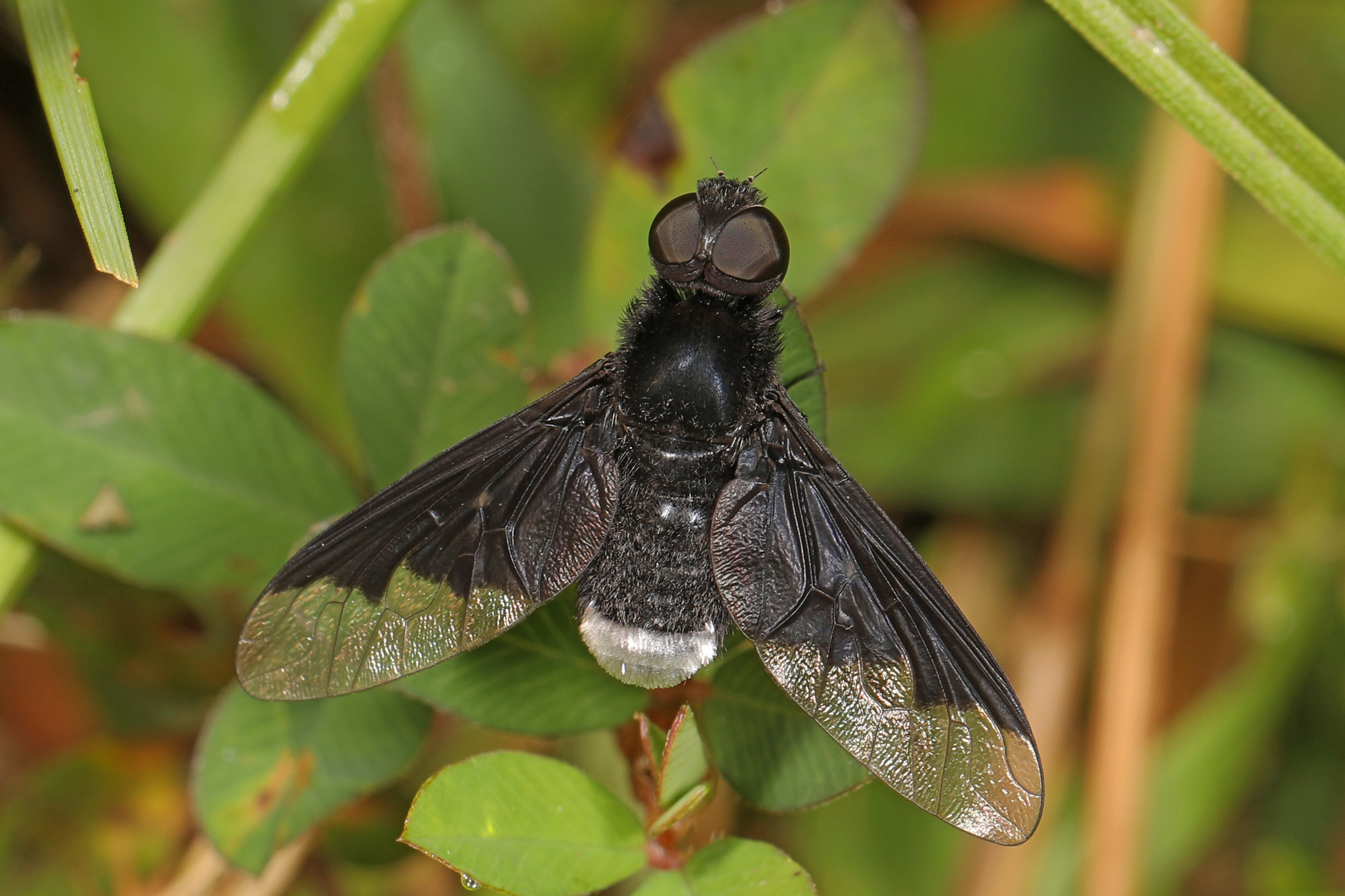
- Anthrax analis, Virginia

Scientific classification
- Kingdom: Animalia
- Phylum: Arthropoda
- Clade: Pancrustacea
- Class: Insecta
- Order: Diptera
- Family: Bombyliidae
- Subfamily: Anthracinae
- Tribe: Anthracini
- Genus: Anthrax
- Species: A. analis

Binomial name
- Anthrax analis Say, 1823

Synonyms
- Anthrax georgicus Macquart, 1834; Anthrax cedens Walker, 1852; Hemipenthes latelimbatus Bigot, 1892; Spongostylum grossbecki Johnson, 1913; Spongostylum occidentalis Johnson, 1913

= Anthrax analis =

Species of insect

Anthrax analis, the black bee fly, is a species of bee fly in the family Bombyliidae. It can be found throughout North America, from the Yukon east to Quebec in Canada, the entire mainland United States, most of Mexico, and as far south as Costa Rica and Cuba. As an adult it is a pollinator, and as a larva it is a parasitoid of tiger beetles in the genus Cicindela, and likely also of solitary bees. It is variable in appearance, with the posterior half of the wings usually transparent, but in the eastern United States the wings may be entirely dark. The body itself is covered in black hair, but the tip of the abdomen usually has silvery scales.

== Life cycle ==
Egg — The life cycle of Anthrax analis begins with the egg. After fertilization, the adult black bee fly lays its eggs on soil near the nests of tiger beetles, which their larvae will parasitize. These tiny, oval-shaped eggs are often camouflaged to blend in with the environment. The strategic placement of eggs ensures that once they hatch, the larvae will have direct access to their prey.

Larva — Upon hatching, the larvae resemble small worms, lacking wings and having soft bodies. They begin their parasitic behavior by invading the nearby host nests, feeding either on the host beetle larvae. As they grow, the larvae move through the nest, continuing to feed and molt several times. Their primary function during this stage is to gather enough nutrients to support their development into the pupal stage.

Pupal — After the larval stage, the black bee fly undergoes pupation, typically occurring within the host burrows or in the soil nearby. During this stage, although the pupa remains externally inactive, its body is undergoing significant internal transformations. The pupal case is often hidden for protection, either buried underground or camouflaged.

Adult — Emerging from the pupa, the adult black bee fly is characterized by fully formed and hardened body structures, wings, and functional reproductive organs. Adult female A. analis are commonly seen hovering near the entrances to tiger beetle nests, occasionally ovipositing eggs near the beetle larvae.

== Look-alikes ==
The black bee fly is similar in appearance to various other bee fly species, including the sinuous bee fly Hemipenthes sinuosa, Anthrax argyropygus, Ins celeris, Anthrax aterrimus, Thyridanthrax atratus, Ogcodocera leucoprocta, and Hemipenthes morioides.
