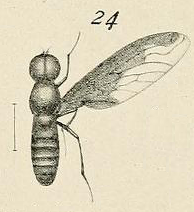
- Female B. aterrimus
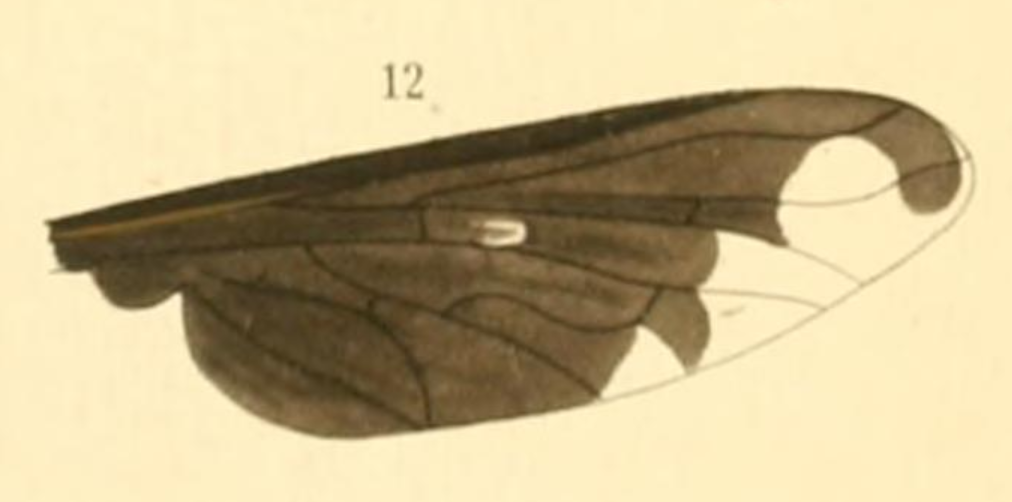
- B. leucostigma wing

Scientific classification
- Kingdom: Animalia
- Phylum: Arthropoda
- Clade: Pancrustacea
- Class: Insecta
- Order: Diptera
- Family: Bombyliidae
- Tribe: Anthracini
- Genus: Brachyanax; Evenhuis, 1981

Type species
- Brachyanax thelestrephones Evenhuis, 1981

= Brachyanax =

Genus of flies

Brachyanax is a genus of bee fly in the subfamily Anthracinae. It was circumscribed by Neal Evenhuis in 1981. Thirteen species are recognized, and they are found in Asia and Australasia.

== Taxonomic history ==
The American entomologist Neal Evenhuis created the genus in a 1981 paper in Pacific Insects. His initial circumscription included eleven species. Four species had first been described in the genus Anthrax; Evenhuis described the other seven species in his initial circumscription. Evenhuis and Junichi Yukawa described an additional new species in 1986. Further changes to the list of species in Brachyanax occurred in 1988 and 1999.

The generic name Brachyanax comes from the Greek βραχύς (brakhús; "small, short") and ἄναξ (ánax; "lord, master, general-in-chief"). The specific epithet of the type species, thelestrephones, comes from the Greek θηλή (thēlḗ; "nipple") and στρέφω (stréphō; "twist"). This led to the American entomologist Arnold Menke including Brachyanax thelestrephones in his 1993 list "Funny or Curious Zoological Names"; Menke translated the binomen as "little chief nipple twister". Subsequent discussions of interesting taxonomic names have also included this binomen, using the same translation. The species B. thelestrephones became recognized as a junior synonym of B. satellitius in 1999. However, following the International Code of Zoological Nomenclature, the type species of the genus remains Brachyanax thelestrephones.

== Phylogeny ==
When Evenhuis circumscribed Brachyanax, he wrote this genus was between the tribes Anthracini and Exoprosopini although more similar to the former. Evenhuis and other dipterists have subsequently continued to place Brachyanax in Anthracini. The other genera placed in Anthracini are: Anthrax, Dicranoclista, Satyramoeba, Spogostylum, Thraxan, Turkmeniella, Walkeromyia, and Xenox.

== Distribution ==
Brachyanax species are found in the Australasian/Oceanian realm (Australia, Indonesia, Papua New Guinea, Solomon Islands, Bonin Islands), the Oriental realm (Indonesia, Philippines, Laos, India, Malaysia, Singapore, possibly China), and the Palearctic realm (Japan, possibly China).

== Description ==
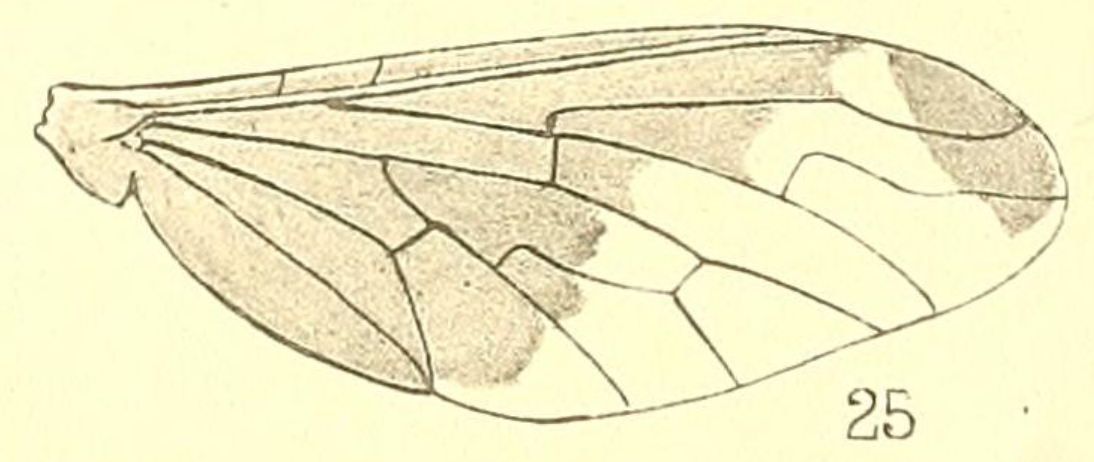
B. gentilis wing

Males and females in the genus Brachyanax are morphologically the same except with respect to genitalia. Their body length is 3.5–11.0 mm (0.14–0.43 in) and their wingspan is 10.0–28.0 mm (0.39–1.10 in). The head is either as wide as or narrower than the thorax; the abdomen is slightly narrower than the thorax.

Brachyanax species have distinctive antennae: the pedicel, or second segment, is "spherically cone-shaped" and the base of the third segment, or flagellum, is rather enlarged and bulbous.

The wing venation is also distinctive: the radial vein R_{2+3} originates near the r-m crossvein and gently curves 90° to the wing's margin. The radial veins R_{2+3} and R_{4} both lack an appendix, or spur-vein, at their base. The anal cell, or cell cup, is closed, typically with a short stalk. The basal portion of the wing is an opaque dark brown; this can cover one-third to four-fifths of each wing's area. The remainder of the wing is colourless and transparent. Its squamae and squamal fringe are brown to dark brown.

== Species ==
In 2015, Evenhuis and D. J. Greathead recognized the following thirteen species in Brachyanax:

- B. acroleucus (Bigot, 1892)
- B. ater (Roberts, 1928)
- B. aterrimus (Doleschall, 1858)
- B. bifuscatipennis (Evenhuis & Arakaki, 1980)
- B. chichijimensis Evenhuis, 1981
- B. costalis Evenhuis, 1981
- B. gentilis (Brunetti, 1909)
- B. hemipenthes Evenhuis, 1988
- B. leucostigma (Wulp, 1898)
- B. magnipennis Evenhuis, 1981
- B. papuanus Evenhuis, 1981
- B. perniger Evenhuis & Yukawa, 1986
- B. satellitius (Walker, 1856)
