= Anthrax cascadensis =

Scientific classification
- Kingdom: Animalia
- Phylum: Arthropoda
- Class: Insecta
- Order: Diptera
- Family: Bombyliidae
- Subfamily: Anthracinae
- Tribe: Anthracini
- Genus: Anthrax
- Species: A. cascadensis

Binomial name
- Anthrax cascadensis Marston, 1963

Synonyms
- Anthrax albofasciatus ssp. cascadensis Marston, 1963

Species of fly

Anthrax cascadensis is a species of bee fly in the family Bombyliidae. It is found in the western United States, north into British Columbia, Canada.
