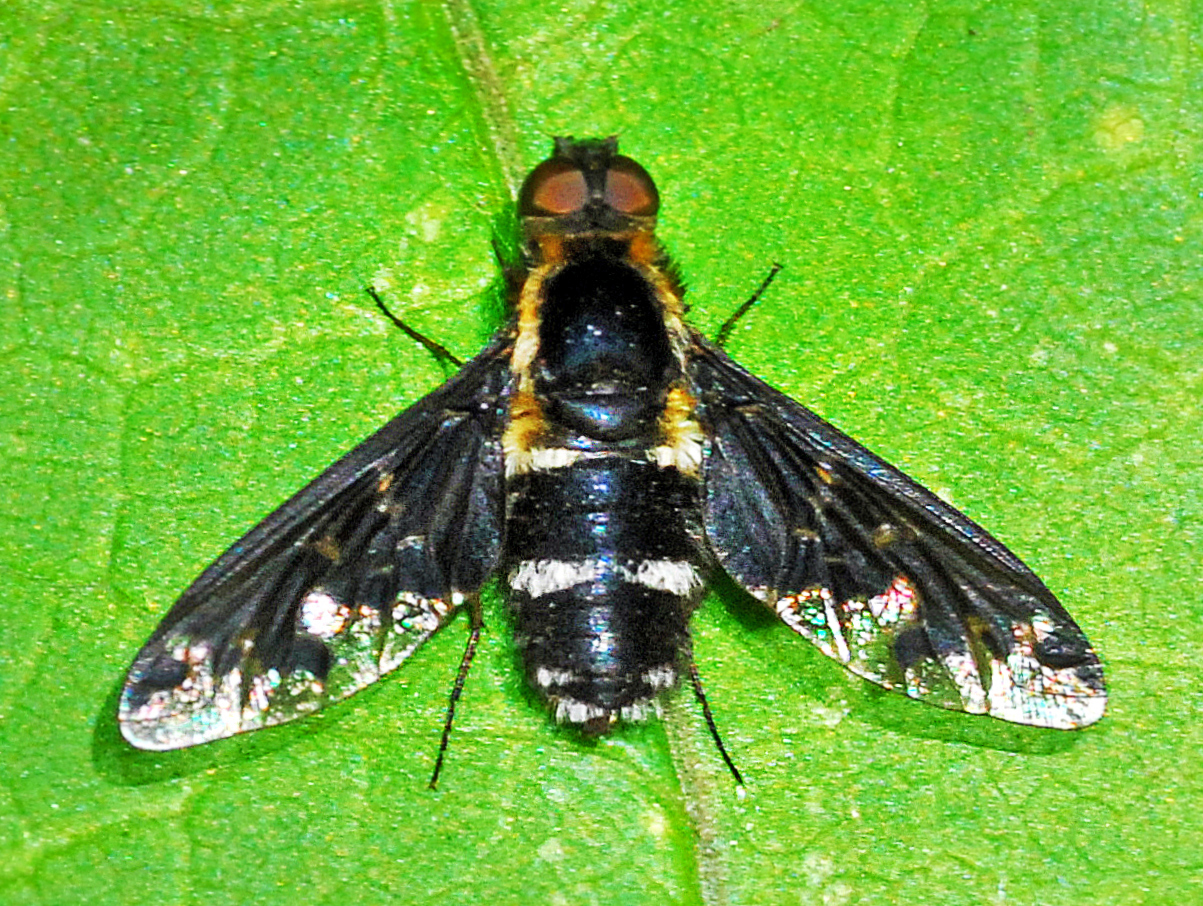

Scientific classification
- Kingdom: Animalia
- Phylum: Arthropoda
- Class: Insecta
- Order: Diptera
- Family: Bombyliidae
- Genus: Hemipenthes
- Species: H. maura

Binomial name
- Hemipenthes maura (Linnaeus, 1758)

Synonyms
- Musca maura Linnaeus, 1758; Nemotelus maurus (Linnaeus, 1758); Hemipenthes maurus (Linnaeus, 1758); Musca denigrata Linnaeus, 1767; Anthrax daemon Panzer, 1797; Anthrax bifasciata Meigen, 1804; Anthrax relata Walker, 1852; Anthrax uncinus Loew, 1869; Hemipenthes flavotomentosa Paramonov, 1927

= Hemipenthes maura =

Species of bee fly

Hemipenthes maura is a species of bee fly belonging to the family Bombyliidae.

== Distribution and habitat ==
This species has a Palaearctic distribution. In Europe it is present in Spain, France, Belgium, Germany, Switzerland, Austria, Italy, Malta, Denmark, Norway, Finland, Estonia, Lithuania, Poland, the Czech Republic, Slovakia, Hungary, Ukraine, Croatia and the European part of Russia. Further east, it occurs from West Asia to China.

This insect inhabits forest edges, xerothermic grasslands and psammophilous grasslands.

== Description ==
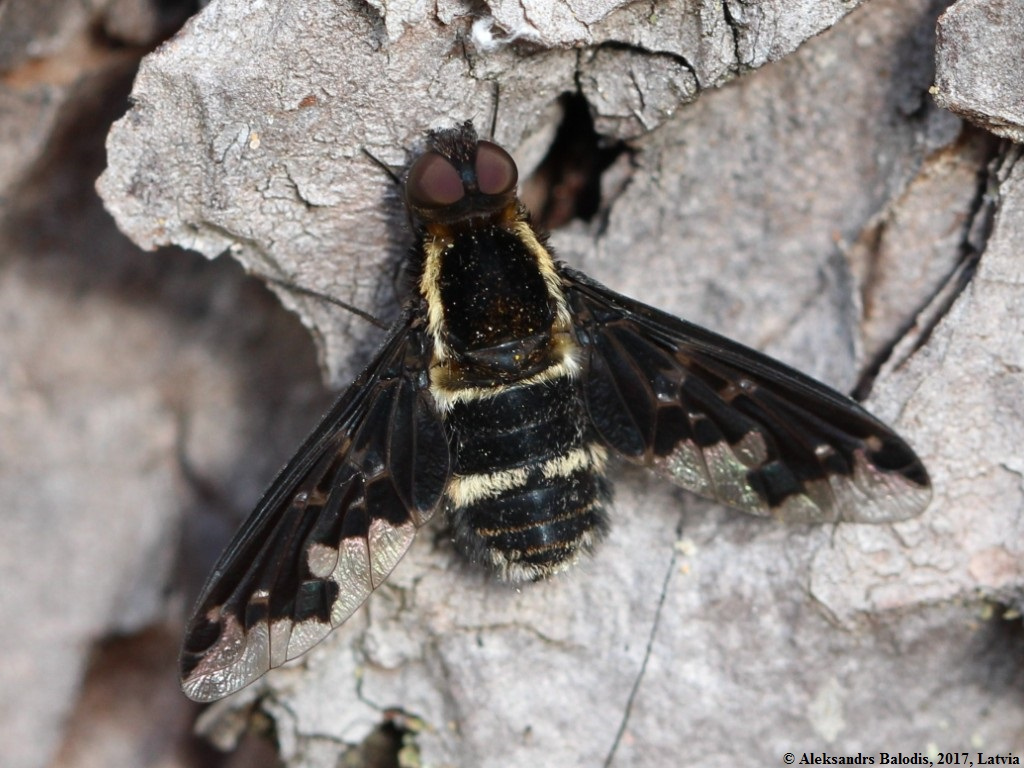
Imago

Hemipenthes maura can reach a body length of about 6–12 mm (0.24–0.47 in). Body coloration is matt black, with black dusting. The spherical head is characterized by a very short snout, not much longer than the mouth. In addition to black scales along the back edge of the compound eyes, golden yellow scales appear in front of the forehead and face. The antennae have an asymmetrically onion-shaped third segment. Behind the head there is a rim of black hair, with golden yellow in the upper part. On the sides of the top of the torso, there are a pair of white or yellowish stripes. The midsection and the shield have long bristles on the edges. These insects can be distinguished from similar species by their wing venation. First of all, Hemipenthes morio, in which the tip of the R1 radial cell is transparent. The wing scales are brownish-white with brown hair on the edges. The wings are blackened on a larger surface is, and the darkening also includes the tops of the radial and discoidal cells. The abdomen has the rear edges of tergites with narrow white bands, except for the fifth tergite, which has a yellowish band on the back edge.

== Biology ==
Adults fly from June to August. They visit flowers to feed on nectar and pollen. Larvae are hyperparasites on parasitic Hymenoptera. The larvae devour the larvae of the Ichneumonidae and Tachinidae larvae.
