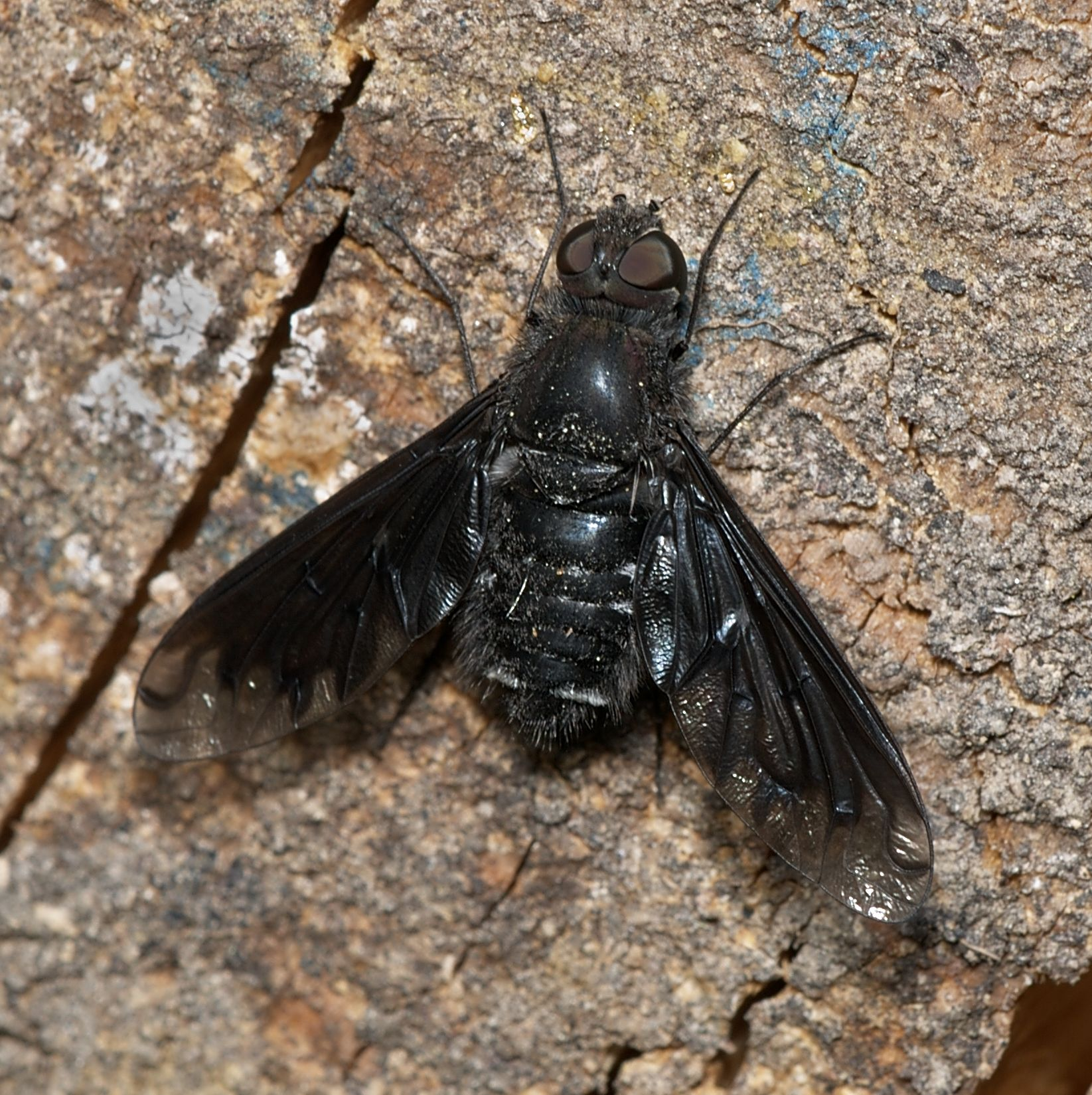

Scientific classification
- Kingdom: Animalia
- Phylum: Arthropoda
- Class: Insecta
- Order: Diptera
- Family: Bombyliidae
- Subfamily: Anthracinae
- Tribe: Anthracini
- Genus: Anthrax
- Species: A. anthrax

Binomial name
- Anthrax anthrax (Schrank, 1781)

Synonyms
- Musca anthrax Schrank, 1781; Anthrax sinuata Meigen, 1804

= Anthrax anthrax =

Species of fly

Anthrax anthrax is a species of fly in the family Bombyliidae. Unlike, for example, Bombylius major, this species does not mimic a bee. The eggs are flicked by the adult female toward the entrance of the nests of mason bees. After hatching, the larvae find their way into the nests to feed on the bee larva. A. anthrax can be found in May to August throughout mainland Europe. In the Netherlands A. anthrax is a common visitor of insect hotels. It was first recorded as breeding in Britain in 2019.

== Description ==
A. anthrax is a fairly large fly, the body length is 10 mm. The body is black with four white markings at tergum 2 and 3 and two white markings at the end of the abdomen. Tergum 1 is black with tufts of white hairs at the side. These tufts are visible in this picture of a hovering fly. The wings are mostly black, only the top is transparent. The veins are dark brown. The following picture was overexposed. Due to the brightly lit background the veins are visible. The newly emerged Anthrax anthrax may be found sitting on a bee hotel. Their body is dull black with more transparent wings.

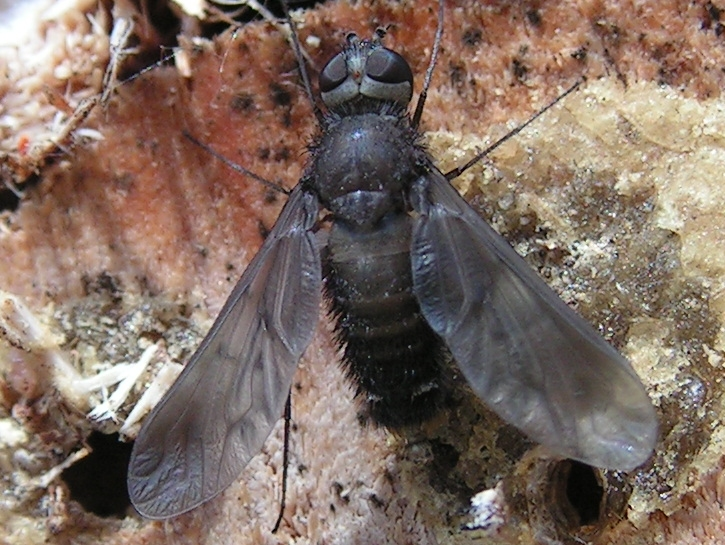
A recently emerged A. anthrax

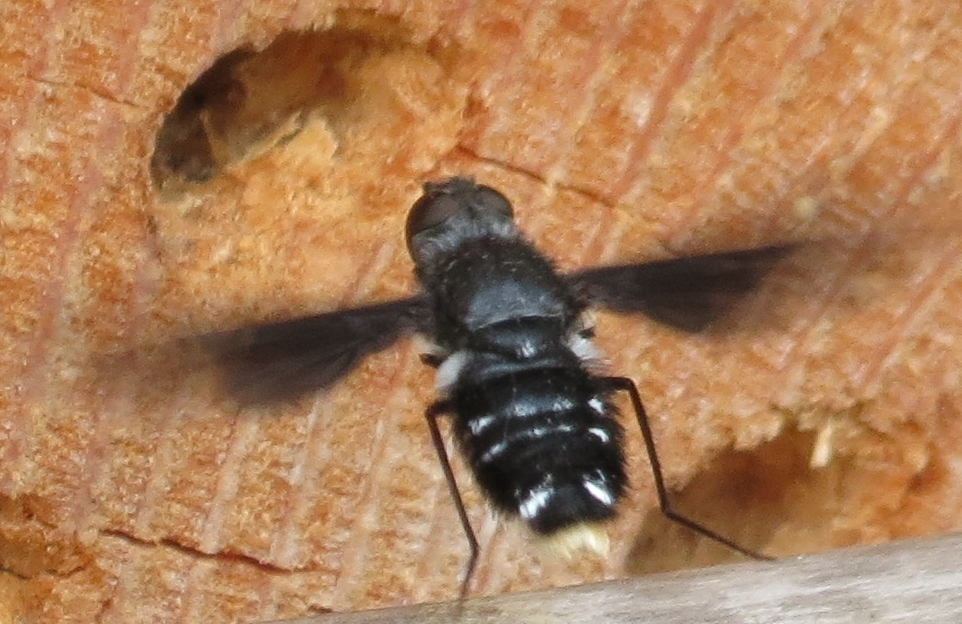
A. anthrax hovering, note the white tufts of hair at the sides of tergum 1

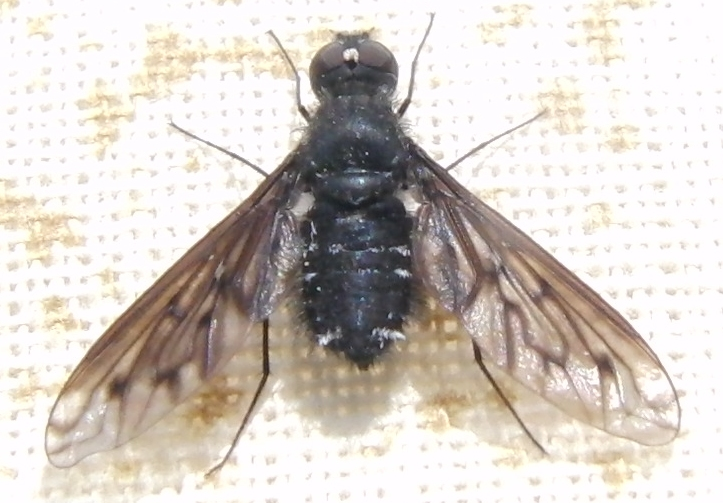
The veins are visible due to the bright background

== Behaviour ==
The females may be found hovering before an insect hotel shooting eggs into the nest entrances of mason bees. Occasionally females rub their abdomen with dust or sand. Dust or sand is necessary to make the eggs less tacky. To this end the females have a 'sand chamber'. A. anthrax is sometimes seen hovering above a flower.

== Distribution ==
Afghanistan, Albania, Algeria, Armenia, Austria, Azerbaijan, Belarus, Belgium, Bulgaria, Canary Islands, China, Czech Republic, Denmark, Estonia, Finland, France, Germany, Greece, Georgia, Hungary, Iran, Italy, Serbia, Sweden.

A. anthrax hovering near a nest entrance of a mason bee

A. anthrax hovering above a flower
