= Anthrax seriepunctatus =

Scientific classification
- Kingdom: Animalia
- Phylum: Arthropoda
- Class: Insecta
- Order: Diptera
- Family: Bombyliidae
- Subfamily: Anthracinae
- Tribe: Anthracini
- Genus: Anthrax
- Species: A. seriepunctatus

Binomial name
- Anthrax seriepunctatus (Osten Sacken, 1886)

Synonyms
- Argyramoeba seriepunctata Osten Sacken, 1887

Species of insect

Anthrax seriepunctatus is a species of bee fly in the family Bombyliidae. It is found in northwestern Mexico and the southwestern United States.
