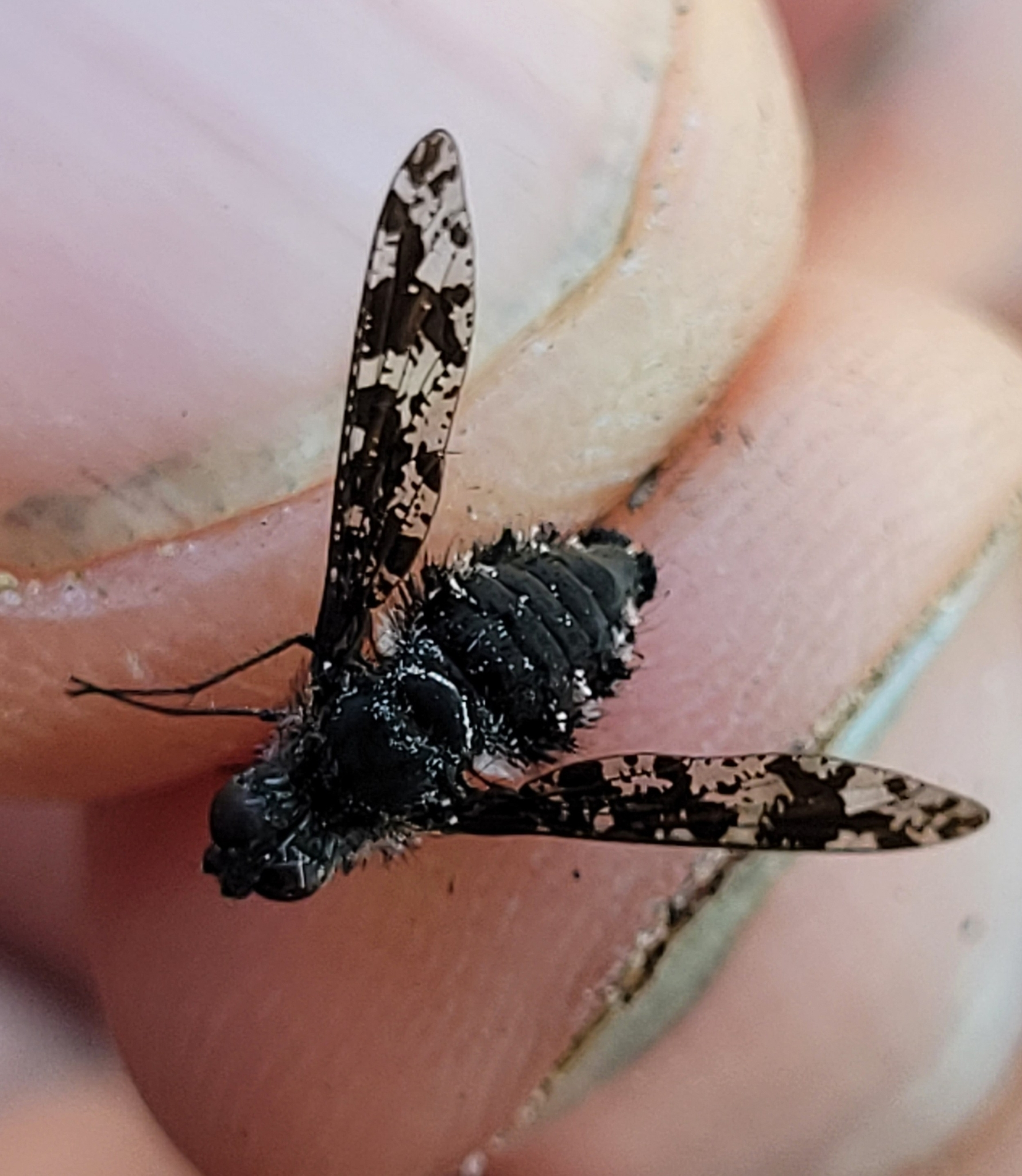

Scientific classification
- Kingdom: Animalia
- Phylum: Arthropoda
- Class: Insecta
- Order: Diptera
- Family: Bombyliidae
- Subfamily: Anthracinae
- Tribe: Anthracini
- Genus: Anthrax
- Species: A. irroratus

Binomial name
- Anthrax irroratus Say, 1823

= Anthrax irroratus =

Species of fly

Anthrax irroratus is a species of bee fly in the family Bombyliidae. It is widespread in North America, found across most of Canada and the United States as far north as Alaska and the Northwest Territories, and south into Mexico, Guatemala, Honduras, and Puerto Rico. The larvae are parasitoids of a variety of solitary bees and wasps across at least five different families.
