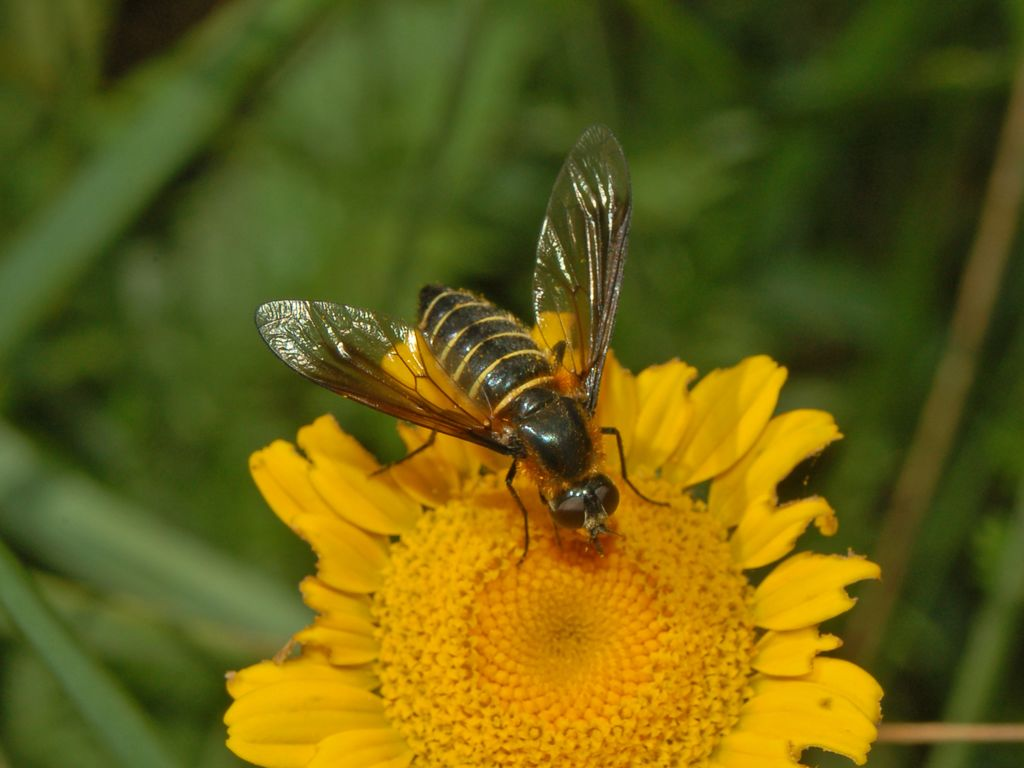

Scientific classification
- Kingdom: Animalia
- Phylum: Arthropoda
- Class: Insecta
- Order: Diptera
- Family: Bombyliidae
- Genus: Lomatia
- Species: L. belzebul

Binomial name
- Lomatia belzebul (Fabricius, 1794)

Synonyms
- Lomatia loewi Paramonov, 1931; Lomatia paramonovi Evenhuis, 1978

= Lomatia belzebul =

Species of fly

Lomatia belzebul is a species of 'bee fliy' belonging to the family Bombyliidae subfamily Lomatiinae.

== Distribution ==
This species is mainly present in France, Greece, Italy, Portugal, southern Russia, Spain, Switzerland, in the eastern Palearctic realm, in the Near East, and in North Africa.

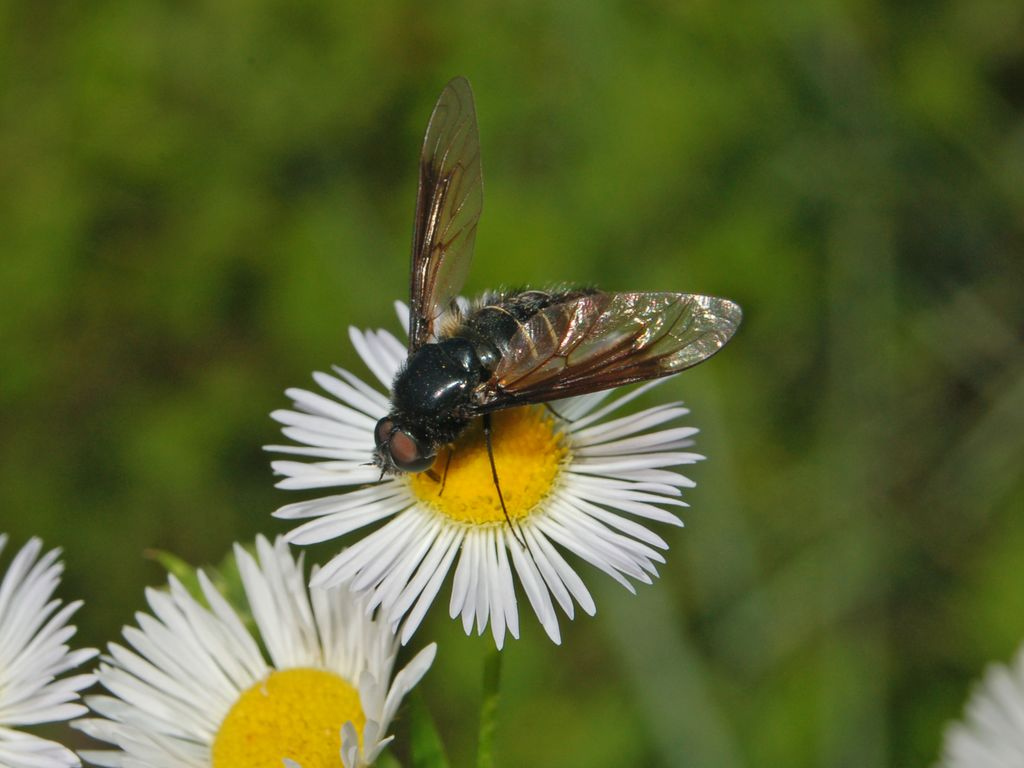
Lomatia belzebul, male

== Description ==
The adults grow up to 10–13 millimetres (0.39–0.51 in) long. Body is shining black. In males the thorax shows black hairs, tawny in females. The wings have a wide brown band close to costal margin. The abdomen is black, with yellow bord of the segments, except the first segment.

The striped abdomen can confuse these flies with some Hymenoptera for predators.
