= Luminis =

Luminis may refer to:

- Luminiș or the George Enescu Memorial House, a villa in Sinaia, Romania
- Luminis (software company); see rFactor 2
- Thyridanthrax luminis, a species of bee fly in the family Bombyliidae
- Vox Luminis, a Belgian early music vocal ensemble
