= Anthrax pluto =

Scientific classification
- Kingdom: Animalia
- Phylum: Arthropoda
- Class: Insecta
- Order: Diptera
- Family: Bombyliidae
- Subfamily: Anthracinae
- Tribe: Anthracini
- Genus: Anthrax
- Species: A. pluto

Binomial name
- Anthrax pluto Wiedemann, 1828

Species of fly

Anthrax pluto is a species of fly in the family Bombyliidae. It is found in the northwestern United States, from Kansas and New York north to Ontario, Canada.
