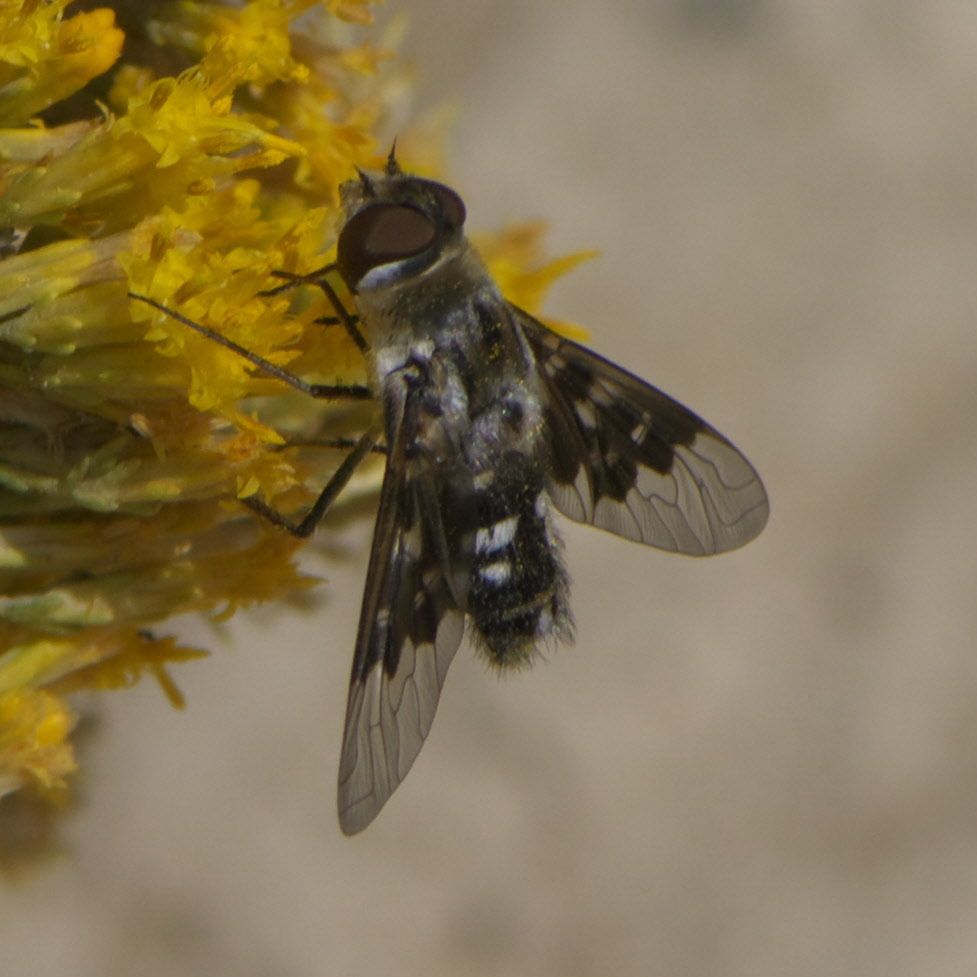

Scientific classification
- Domain: Eukaryota
- Kingdom: Animalia
- Phylum: Arthropoda
- Class: Insecta
- Order: Diptera
- Family: Bombyliidae
- Tribe: Villini
- Genus: Thyridanthrax
- Species: T. fenestratoides

Binomial name
- Thyridanthrax fenestratoides (Coquillett, 1892)

Synonyms
- Anthrax fenestratoides Coquillett, 1892; Anthrax macula Cole, 1919

= Thyridanthrax fenestratoides =

Species of fly

Thyridanthrax fenestratoides is a species of bee fly in the family Bombyliidae. It is found in Canada from the Yukon to Ontario, south through most of the United States, and into Mexico. It is similar to the species T. fenestratus from Eurasia.
