= Anthrax pauper =

Scientific classification
- Kingdom: Animalia
- Phylum: Arthropoda
- Class: Insecta
- Order: Diptera
- Family: Bombyliidae
- Subfamily: Anthracinae
- Tribe: Anthracini
- Genus: Anthrax
- Species: A. pauper

Binomial name
- Anthrax pauper (Loew, 1869)

Synonyms
- Argyromoeba pauper Loew, 1869

Species of fly

Anthrax pauper is a species of bee fly in the family Bombyliidae. It is found in the eastern United States from Texas north to Ontario, Canada.
