= Anthrax striatipennis =

Scientific classification
- Kingdom: Animalia
- Phylum: Arthropoda
- Class: Insecta
- Order: Diptera
- Family: Bombyliidae
- Subfamily: Anthracinae
- Tribe: Anthracini
- Genus: Anthrax
- Species: A. striatipennis

Binomial name
- Anthrax striatipennis Marston, 1970

Synonyms
- Anthrax irroratus ssp. striatipennis Marston, 1970

Species of fly

Anthrax striatipennis is a species of bee fly in the family Bombyliidae. It is found in the southeastern United States.
