= Anthrax nigriventris =

Scientific classification
- Kingdom: Animalia
- Phylum: Arthropoda
- Class: Insecta
- Order: Diptera
- Family: Bombyliidae
- Subfamily: Anthracinae
- Tribe: Anthracini
- Genus: Anthrax
- Species: A. nigriventris

Binomial name
- Anthrax nigriventris Marston, 1970

Synonyms
- Anthrax pluto ssp. nigriventris Marston, 1970

Species of fly

Anthrax nigriventris is a species of bee fly in the family Bombyliidae. It is found in the southwestern United States, Mexico, and Cuba.
