= Dicranoclista fasciata =

Scientific classification
- Domain: Eukaryota
- Kingdom: Animalia
- Phylum: Arthropoda
- Class: Insecta
- Order: Diptera
- Family: Bombyliidae
- Genus: Dicranoclista
- Species: D. fasciata

Binomial name
- Dicranoclista fasciata Johnson & Johnson, 1960

Species of fly

Dicranoclista fasciata is a species of bee fly in the family Bombyliidae. It is found in the western United States from Arizona to Washington, north to British Columbia, Canada.
