= Hemipenthes edwardsii =

Scientific classification
- Domain: Eukaryota
- Kingdom: Animalia
- Phylum: Arthropoda
- Class: Insecta
- Order: Diptera
- Family: Bombyliidae
- Genus: Hemipenthes
- Species: H. edwardsii

Binomial name
- Hemipenthes edwardsii (Coquillett, 1894)

Synonyms
- Anthrax edwardsii Coquillett, 1894

Species of fly

Hemipenthes edwardsii is a species of bee fly in the family Bombyliidae. It is found in the western United States and British Columbia, Canada.
