= Hemipenthes inops =

Scientific classification
- Domain: Eukaryota
- Kingdom: Animalia
- Phylum: Arthropoda
- Class: Insecta
- Order: Diptera
- Family: Bombyliidae
- Genus: Hemipenthes
- Species: H. inops

Binomial name
- Hemipenthes inops (Coquillett, 1887)

Synonyms
- Anthrax inops Coquillett, 1887

Species of fly

Hemipenthes inops is a species of bee fly in the family Bombyliidae. It is found in the western United States. It is somewhat unusual compared to other members of the genus Hemipenthes in that its wings are mostly transparent.
