= Hemipenthes albus =

Scientific classification
- Domain: Eukaryota
- Kingdom: Animalia
- Phylum: Arthropoda
- Class: Insecta
- Order: Diptera
- Family: Bombyliidae
- Genus: Hemipenthes
- Species: H. albus

Binomial name
- Hemipenthes albus Ávalos-Hernández, 2009

Species of fly

Hemipenthes albus is a species of bee fly in the family Bombyliidae, known from Mexico.
