= Thyridanthrax andrewsi =

Scientific classification
- Domain: Eukaryota
- Kingdom: Animalia
- Phylum: Arthropoda
- Class: Insecta
- Order: Diptera
- Family: Bombyliidae
- Tribe: Villini
- Genus: Thyridanthrax
- Species: T. andrewsi

Binomial name
- Thyridanthrax andrewsi (Hall, 1970)

Synonyms
- Villa andrewsi Hall, 1970

Species of fly

Thyridanthrax andrewsi is a species of bee fly in the family Bombyliidae. It is found in the United States in California and Idaho.
