= Hemipenthes webberi =

Scientific classification
- Domain: Eukaryota
- Kingdom: Animalia
- Phylum: Arthropoda
- Class: Insecta
- Order: Diptera
- Family: Bombyliidae
- Tribe: Villini
- Genus: Hemipenthes
- Species: H. webberi

Binomial name
- Hemipenthes webberi (Johnson, 1919)

Synonyms
- Villa webberi Johnson, 1919

Species of fly

Hemipenthes webberi is a species of bee flies in the family Bombyliidae.

== Description ==
H. webberi measures 6–10 mm in length. They have a dark coloured abdomen, thorax, and head, with yellowish flecks on the head and thorax. A few white hairs are present at the edges of the thorax. The antennae are black. The legs are black, except at the tibiae, which are yellow.

=== Holotype ===
The holotype, named as Villa webberi by Johnson, 1919, is a male found at Massachusetts. It is in the Museum of Comparative Zoology.

== Biology and lifecycle ==
Known larval hosts for Hemipenthes include both Lepidoptera and diprionid sawflies and the tachinid flies and ichneumonoid wasps parasitizing them. Adults fly in June and July.
