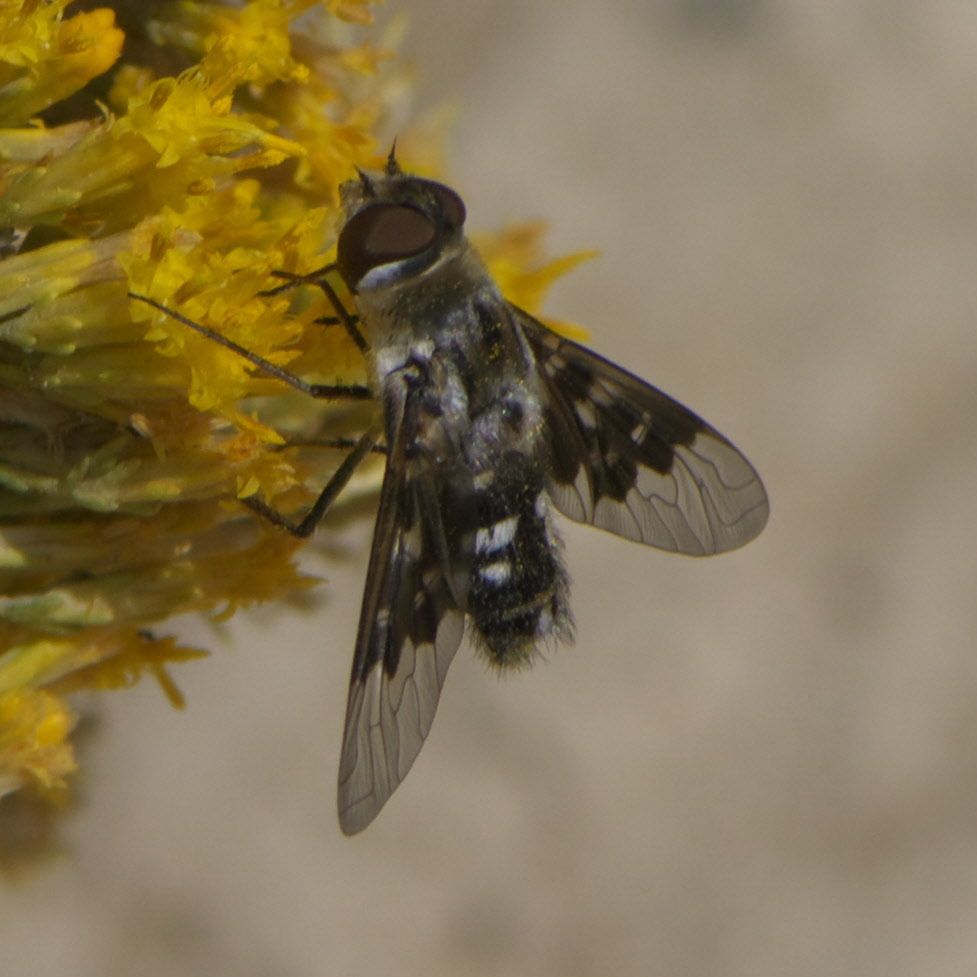
- Thyridanthrax fenestratoides

Scientific classification
- Domain: Eukaryota
- Kingdom: Animalia
- Phylum: Arthropoda
- Class: Insecta
- Order: Diptera
- Family: Bombyliidae
- Subfamily: Anthracinae
- Tribe: Villini
- Genus: Thyridanthrax; Osten-Sacken, 1886

= Thyridanthrax =

Genus of flies

Thyridanthrax is a genus of bee flies in the family Bombyliidae. There are about 50 described species in the genus Thyridanthrax, found across Eurasia, Africa, North America, and South America.

== Species ==
- Thyridanthrax andrewsi (Hall, 1970)
- Thyridanthrax atratus (Coquillett, 1887)
- Thyridanthrax fenestratoides (Coquillett, 1892)
- Thyridanthrax fenestratus (Fallen, 1814)
- Thyridanthrax luminis (Hall, 1970)
- Thyridanthrax melanopterus (Hall, 1975)
- Thyridanthrax meridionalis Cole, 1923
- Thyridanthrax nugator (Coquillett, 1887)
- Thyridanthrax pallidus (Coquillett, 1887)
- Thyridanthrax pertusus (Loew, 1869)
- Thyridanthrax selene (Osten Sacken, 1886)
- Thyridanthrax sini Cole, 1923
