= Thyridanthrax selene =

Scientific classification
- Domain: Eukaryota
- Kingdom: Animalia
- Phylum: Arthropoda
- Class: Insecta
- Order: Diptera
- Family: Bombyliidae
- Tribe: Villini
- Genus: Thyridanthrax
- Species: T. selene

Binomial name
- Thyridanthrax selene (Osten Sacken, 1886)

Synonyms
- Anthrax otiosa Coquillett, 1887; Anthrax selene Osten Sacken, 1886

Species of fly

Thyridanthrax selene is a species of bee fly in the family Bombyliidae. It is known from the southwestern United States and northwestern Mexico.
