= Anthrax varius =

Scientific classification
- Kingdom: Animalia
- Phylum: Arthropoda
- Clade: Pancrustacea
- Class: Insecta
- Order: Diptera
- Family: Bombyliidae
- Genus: Anthrax
- Species: A. varius

Binomial name
- Anthrax varius Fabricius, 1794

Species of fly

Anthrax varius is a species of bee fly in the family Bombyliidae, first described by Johan Christian Fabricius in 1794. It is found across much of Europe, and parts of northern Africa and the Middle East.
