= Hemipenthes scylla =

Scientific classification
- Domain: Eukaryota
- Kingdom: Animalia
- Phylum: Arthropoda
- Class: Insecta
- Order: Diptera
- Family: Bombyliidae
- Tribe: Villini
- Genus: Hemipenthes
- Species: H. scylla

Binomial name
- Hemipenthes scylla (Osten Sacken, 1887)

Synonyms
- Anthrax scylla Osten Sacken, 1887; Argyromoeba succincta Coquillett, 1894

Species of fly

Hemipenthes scylla is a species of bee fly in the family Bombyliidae. It is widespread in Mexico, and is also known from Texas and Arizona.
