= Ogcodocera =

Scientific classification
- Domain: Eukaryota
- Kingdom: Animalia
- Phylum: Arthropoda
- Class: Insecta
- Order: Diptera
- Family: Bombyliidae
- Subfamily: Lomatiinae
- Genus: Ogcodocera; Macquart, 1841

Genus of flies

Ogcodocera is a North American genus of bee flies in the family Bombyliidae. There are two described species in the genus Ogcodocera.

== Species ==
These two species belong to the genus Ogcodocera:

- Ogcodocera analis (Williston, 1901)^{i c g b}
- Ogcodocera leucoprocta (Wiedemann, 1828)^{i c g b}

Data sources: i = ITIS, c = Catalogue of Life, g = GBIF, b = Bugguide.net
