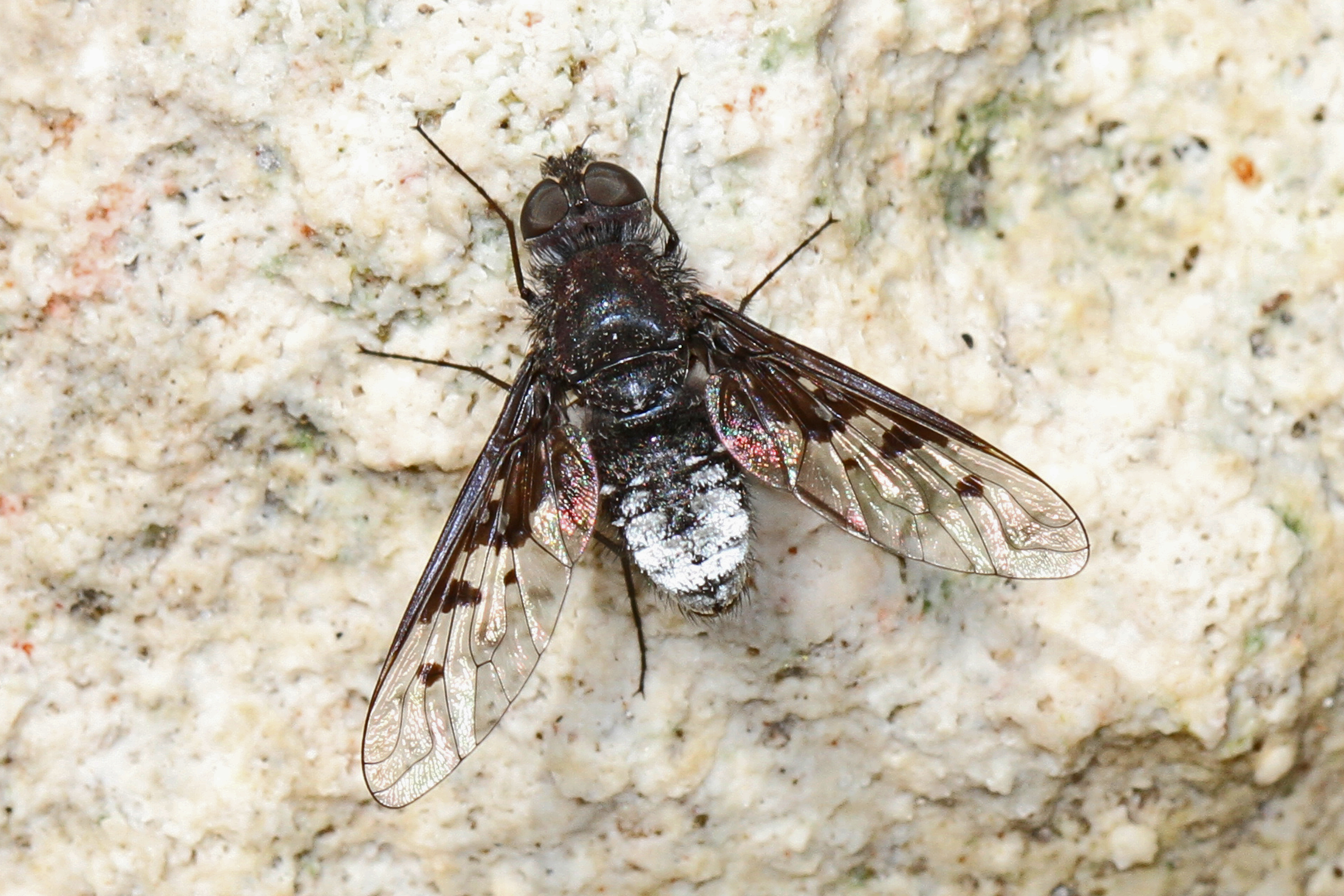

Scientific classification
- Kingdom: Animalia
- Phylum: Arthropoda
- Class: Insecta
- Order: Diptera
- Family: Bombyliidae
- Subfamily: Anthracinae
- Tribe: Anthracini
- Genus: Anthrax
- Species: A. albofasciatus

Binomial name
- Anthrax albofasciatus Macquart, 1840

Synonyms
- Anthrax analis Macquart, 1834; Anthrax antecedens Walker, 1852

= Anthrax albofasciatus =

Species of fly

Anthrax albofasciatus is a species of fly in the family Bombyliidae. It is widespread, found across most of southern Canada, much of the United States, Mexico, Cuba, and Central America.
