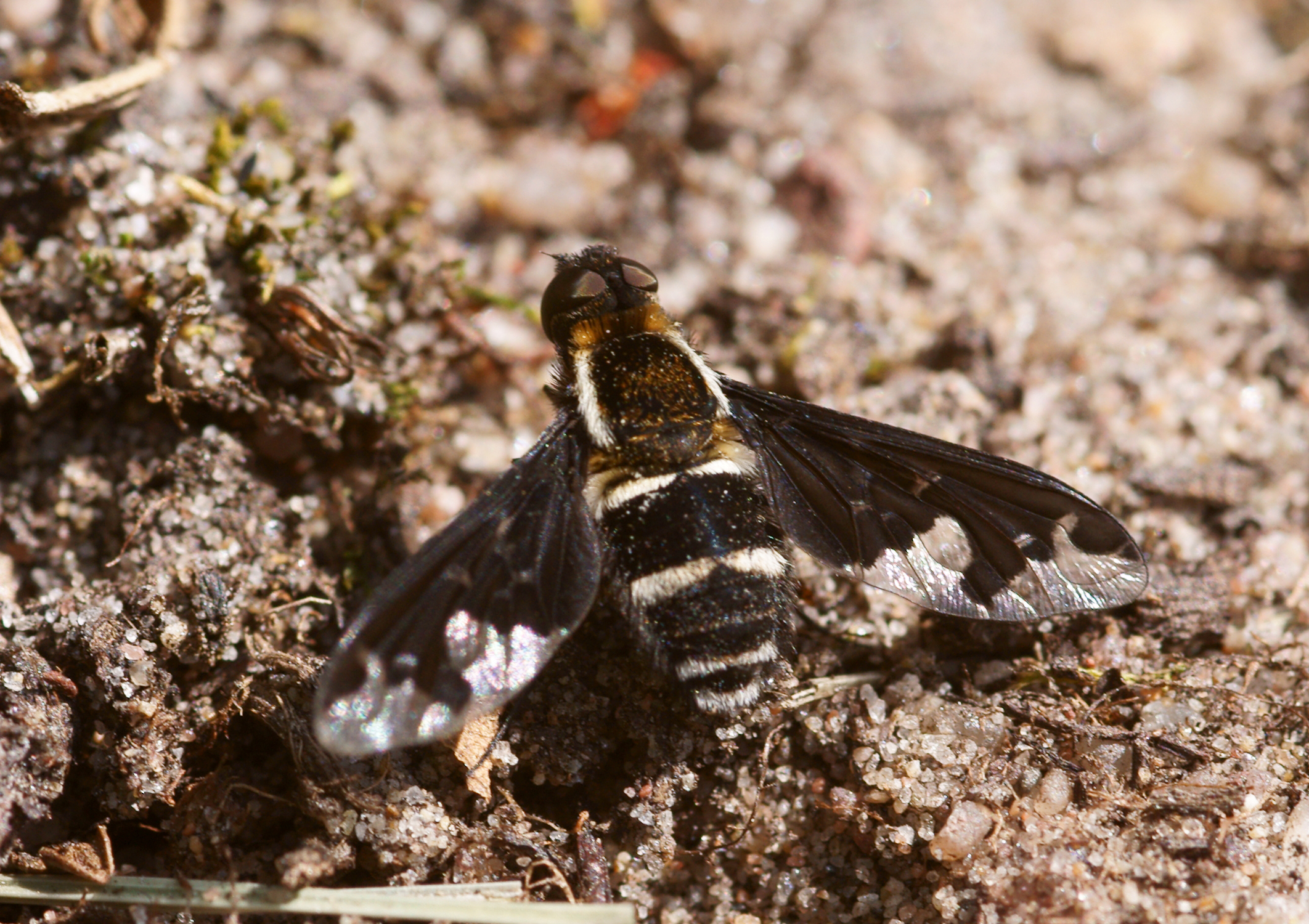
- Hemipenthes maura

Scientific classification
- Kingdom: Animalia
- Phylum: Arthropoda
- Class: Insecta
- Order: Diptera
- Family: Bombyliidae
- Subfamily: Anthracinae
- Tribe: Villini
- Genus: Hemipenthes; Loew, 1869

Type species
- Musca morio Linnaeus, 1758

Synonyms
- Isopenthes Osten Sacken, 1877

= Hemipenthes =

Genus of flies

Hemipenthes is a large genus of flies belonging to the family Bombyliidae (bee-flies). There are many described species, distributed throughout the Holarctic realm. These are small to large robust flies with a body length of 5–14 mm. A number of species formerly in this genus were moved to a separate genus, Ins in 2020.

Larvae are hyperparasites of parasitic Hymenoptera.

== Extant species ==
- H. albus Ávalos-Hernández, 2009 - Nearctic: Mexico
- H. bigradata (Loew, 1869) - Nearctic: USA (California, New Mexico). Neotropical: Cuba, Bahamas, Jamaica, Puerto Rico
- H. blanchardiana (Jaennicke, 1867) - Nearctic: Mexico (Distrito Federal, Guanajuato, Guerrero, México, Puebla, Sonora), USA (Arizona, California, Texas)
- H. castanipes Bigot, 1892 - Nearctic
- H. catulina (Coquillett, 1894) - Nearctic: USA (California, Colorado, Idaho, Illinois, Indiana, Iowa, Michigan, Minnesota, Montana, New Jersey, New Mexico, New York, Ohio, Pennsylvania, Utah, Washington, Wisconsin, Wyoming)
- H. chimaera (Osten Sacken, 1887) - Nearctic: Mexico (Guerrero, Sonora), USA (Arizona)
- H. comanche (Painter in Painter & Painter, 1962) - Nearctic: USA (Arizona, California, Colorado, Nevada, New Mexico, Utah)
- H. differens (Hall, 1976) - Neotropical: Chile
- H. discolor (Hall, 1976) - Neotropical: Chile
- H. ditaenia (Wiedemann, 1828) - Neotropical: Argentina, Chile, Peru, Uruguay
- H. divisa (Walker) - Neotropical: South America
- H. edwardsii (Coquillett, 1894) - Nearctic: Canada (British Columbia), USA (California)
- H. edwarsi (Oldroyd, 1938) - Neotropical: Chile
- H. epilais (Wiedemann, 1828) - Neotropical: Brazil
- H. ethiops (Greathead, 1967) - Afrotropical: Ethiopia
- H. eversmanni Zaitzev and Madra Mandicencio, 1966 - Palaearctic: Kazakhstan, Moldova, Russia, Ukraine
- H. exoprosopoides Paramonov, 1928 - Palaearctic: Armenia, Azerbaijan, China (Sichuan), Iran, Kyrgyz Republic, Tajikistan, Turkmenistan, Uzbekistan.
- H. extensa Wulp, 1888 - Neotropical: Argentina
- H. galapagensis (Painter & Painter, 1974) - Neotropical: Argentina
- H. galathea (Osten Sacken, 1886) - Neotropical: Costa Rica
- H. gaudanica Paramonov, 1927 - Palaearctic: China (Xinjiang), Iran, Kyrgyz Republic, Mongolia, Tajikistan, Turkmenistan, Uzbekistan
- H. gayi (Macquart, 1840) - Neotropical: Chile
- H. gussakovskyi Zaitzev, 1966 - Palaearctic: Tajikistan, Turkmenistan
- H. hamifera (Loew, 1854) - Palaearctic: Armenia, Azerbaijan, Bulgaria, China (Jiangsu, Nei Monggol, Xinjiang), France, Greece, Gruzia, Iran, Italy (incl. Sicily), Kazakhstan, Kyrgyz Republic, Mongolia, Russia (ES, WS), Spain, Tajikistan, Turkey, Turkmenistan, Uzbekistan, Yugoslavia
- H. incisiva (Walker, 1852) - Nearctic: Mexico (Guerrero)
- H. inops (Coquillett, 1887) - Nearctic: USA (Arizona, California, Colorado, Oregon, Utah, Washington)
- H. jaennickeana (Osten Sacken, 1886) - Nearctic: Mexico (Morelos, Sonora), USA (Arizona, California, Colorado, Idaho, Montana, Nevada, New Mexico, Oregon, Texas, Utah)
- H. jezoensis (Matsumura, 1916) - Oriental: Taiwan. Palaearctic: Japan
- H. lepidota (Osten Sacken, 1887) - Nearctic: Canada (Alberta), Mexico (Baja California Norte, Baja California Sur, Chihuahua, Guerrero, Puebla, San Luis Potosí, Sonora, Tamaulipas), USA (Arizona, California, Colorado, Idaho, Louisiana, Nevada)
- H. maura (Linnaeus, 1758) - Palaearctic
- H. melaleuca (Wiedemann, 1828) - Neotropical: Argentina, Uruguay
- H. melana Bowden, 1965 - Oriental: Nepal
- H. mesasiatica Zaitzev, 1962 - Palaearctic: Tajikistan, Turkmenistan, Uzbekistan
- H. micromelas (Bigot, 1892) - Neotropical: Argentina
- H. mischanensis Paramonov, 1927 - Palaearctic: Armenia
- H. montanorum (Austen, 1936) - Oriental: China (Yunnan). Palaearctic: China (Qinghai, Sichuan, Xizang)
- H. morio (Linnaeus, 1758) - Oriental, Palaearctic
- H. nitidofasciata (Portschinsky, 1892) - Palaearctic: Kyrgyz Republic, Russia, Tajikistan
- H. noscibilis (Austen, 1936) - Palaearctic: China (Xizang)
- H. nudiuscula (Thomson, 1869) - Neotropical: Panama
- H. pamirensis Zaitzev, 1962 - Palaearctic: Mongolia, Tajikistan, Turkmenistan, Uzbekistan
- H. panfilovi Zaitzev, 1981 - Palaearctic: Russia
- H. pauper (Becker, 1916) - Palaearctic: Algeria, Egypt
- H. praecisa (Loew, 1869) - Palaearctic: China (Beijing, Hebei, Nei Monggol), Kyrgyz Republic, Mongolia, Russia, Tajikistan, Turkmenistan, Uzbekistan
- H. pullata (Coquillett, 1894) - Nearctic: USA (Arizona, California)
- H. referens (Walker, 1852) - Oriental: India, Myanmar, Pakistan
- H. robusta Zaitzev, 1966 - Palaearctic: Armenia, Azerbaijan, China, Gruzia, Kazakhstan, Kyrgyz Republic, Tajikistan, Turkmenistan, Uzbekistan
- H. ruficollis (Bigot, 1892) - Neotropical: Argentina, Venezuela
- H. scylla (Osten Sacken, 1887) - Nearctic: Mexico (Guanajuato, Sonora), USA (Arizona, Texas). Neotropical: Venezuela
- H. semifucata (Hall, 1976) - Nearctic: USA (Arizona)
- H. seminigra Loew, 1869 - Nearctic: Canada (Alberta, Saskatchewan), Mexico (Sonora), USA (Arizona, California, Colorado, Idaho, Montana, Nevada, New Mexico, Oregon, Utah, Washington). Neotropical: Puerto Rico (incl. H. eumenes)
- H. sinuosa (Wiedemann, 1821) - Nearctic: USA
- H. splendida Zaitzev, 1962 - Palaearctic: Kazakhstan, Kyrgyz Republic, Tajikistan, Turkmenistan
- H. subarcuata Loew, 1871 - Palaearctic: Tajikistan, Tunisia
- H. subvelutina Loew, 1871 - Palaearctic: Armenia, Azerbaijan, China (Shandong), Gruzia, Iran, Mongolia, Kazakhstan, Kyrgyz Republic, Tajikistan, Turkey, Turkmenistan, Uzbekistan
- H. tarapacensis (Hall, 1976) - Neotropical: Chile
- H. tenuirostris (Macquart, 1850) - Neotropical: Chile, Peru
- H. translucens Ávalos-Hernández, 2009 - Nearctic: Mexico
- H. tushetica Zaitzev, 1966 - Palaearctic: Armenia, Azerbaijan, China (Nei Monggol, Qinghai, Xinjiang), Gruzia, Iran
- H. velutina (Meigen, 1820) - Oriental (Pakistan), Palaearctic
- H. villeneuvi François, 1970 - Palaearctic: France, Greece, Italy
- H. vockerothi François, 1969 - Palaearctic: Spain
- H. webberi (Johnson, 1919) - Nearctic: Canada (Ontario, Quebec), USA (Connecticut, Kentucky, Massachusetts, Vermont, Wyoming)
- H. wilcoxi (Painter, 1933) - Nearctic: USA (California, Washington)
- H. yaqui (Painter in Painter & Painter, 1962) - Nearctic: Mexico (Sonora), USA (Arizona)

=== Extinct species ===
- H. gabbroensis (Handlirsch, 1907) - (Miocene) Italy
- H. provincialis (Handlirsch, 1907) - (Oligocene) France
- H. tertiaria (Handlirsch, 1907) - (Oligocene) Germany
