= Ogcodocera analis =

Scientific classification
- Domain: Eukaryota
- Kingdom: Animalia
- Phylum: Arthropoda
- Class: Insecta
- Order: Diptera
- Family: Bombyliidae
- Genus: Ogcodocera
- Species: O. analis

Binomial name
- Ogcodocera analis (Williston, 1901)

Synonyms
- Oncodocera analis Williston, 1901

Species of fly

Ogcodocera analis is a species of bee fly in the family Bombyliidae. It is found in Mexico, Arizona, and Texas.
