= Thyridanthrax nugator =

Scientific classification
- Domain: Eukaryota
- Kingdom: Animalia
- Phylum: Arthropoda
- Class: Insecta
- Order: Diptera
- Family: Bombyliidae
- Tribe: Villini
- Genus: Thyridanthrax
- Species: T. nugator

Binomial name
- Thyridanthrax nugator (Coquillett, 1887)

Synonyms
- Anthrax bifenestrata Bigot, 1892; Anthrax nugator Coquillett, 1887

Species of fly

Thyridanthrax nugator is a species of bee fly in the family Bombyliidae. It is known from California and Oregon.
