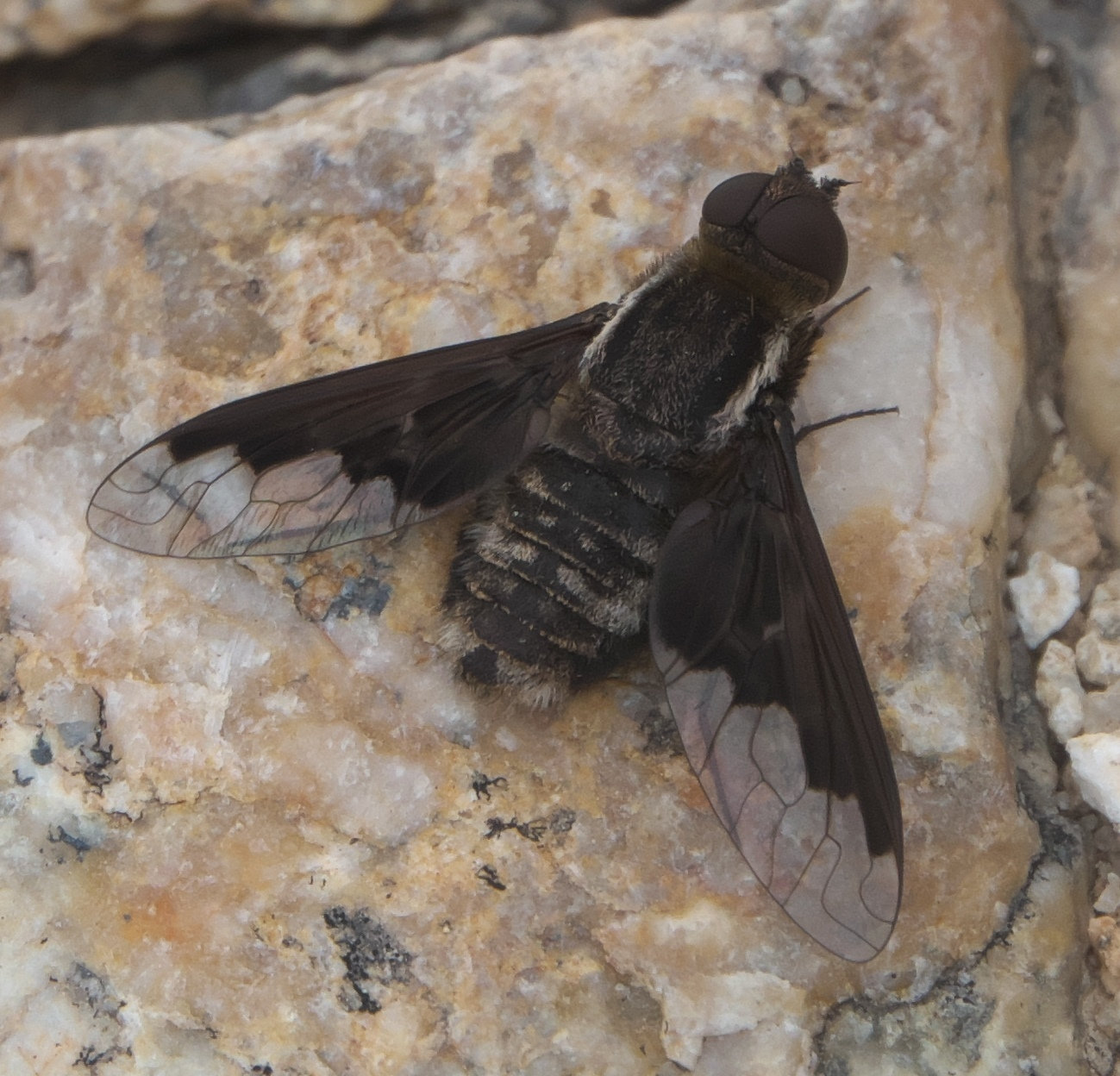
- Hemipenthes seminiger, Arizona

Scientific classification
- Domain: Eukaryota
- Kingdom: Animalia
- Phylum: Arthropoda
- Class: Insecta
- Order: Diptera
- Family: Bombyliidae
- Genus: Hemipenthes
- Species: H. seminigra

Binomial name
- Hemipenthes seminigra Loew, 1869

Synonyms
- Anthrax eumenes Osten Sacken, 1886

= Hemipenthes seminigra =

Species of fly

Hemipenthes seminigra is a fly in the family Bombyliidae (bee-flies) endemic to North America.

== Description ==
The species is 8–12 mm long, with a brown-black body marked by a strip of white hairs along the thorax. The short, round black head bears short antennae. The wings often have a white spot in the center.

== Habitat ==
This species occurs in forests and on forest edges.
