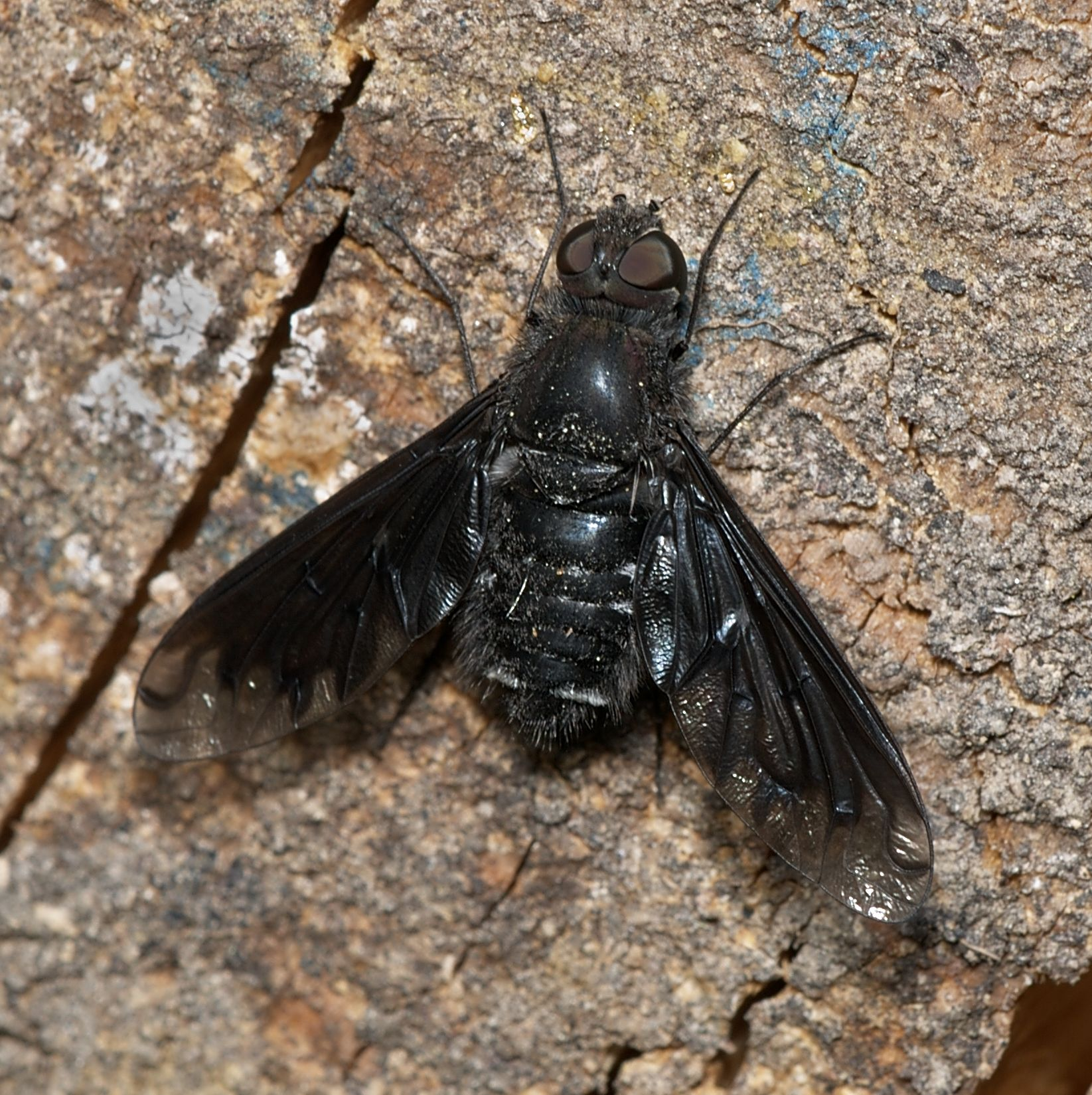
- Anthrax anthrax

Scientific classification
- Kingdom: Animalia
- Phylum: Arthropoda
- Class: Insecta
- Order: Diptera
- Family: Bombyliidae
- Tribe: Anthracini
- Genus: Anthrax; Scopoli, 1763

Type species
- Musca anthrax Schrank 1781

Synonyms
- Antrax Macquart, 1847; Anthax Scudder, 1882; Chalcamoeba Sack, 1909; Chrysamoeba Sack, 1909

= Anthrax (fly) =

Genus of flies

Anthrax is a genus of bombyliid flies, commonly known as "bee-flies" due to their resemblance to bees. Most are dull black flies, and are usually small to medium in size, 4–20 millimetres (0.2–0.8 in), and many species have striking wing patterns.

Anthrax is a very large genus. While worldwide in distribution, most species are from the Palaearctic and Afrotropic regions. The genus includes species parasitic on tiger beetles – an unusual trait among the bee-flies. A. anthrax larvae parasitize bees. Many North American species parasitize solitary wasps.

The type species is Musca morio Linnaeus, 1758, later found to be a misidentification of Musca anthrax Schrank, 1781.

== Species ==
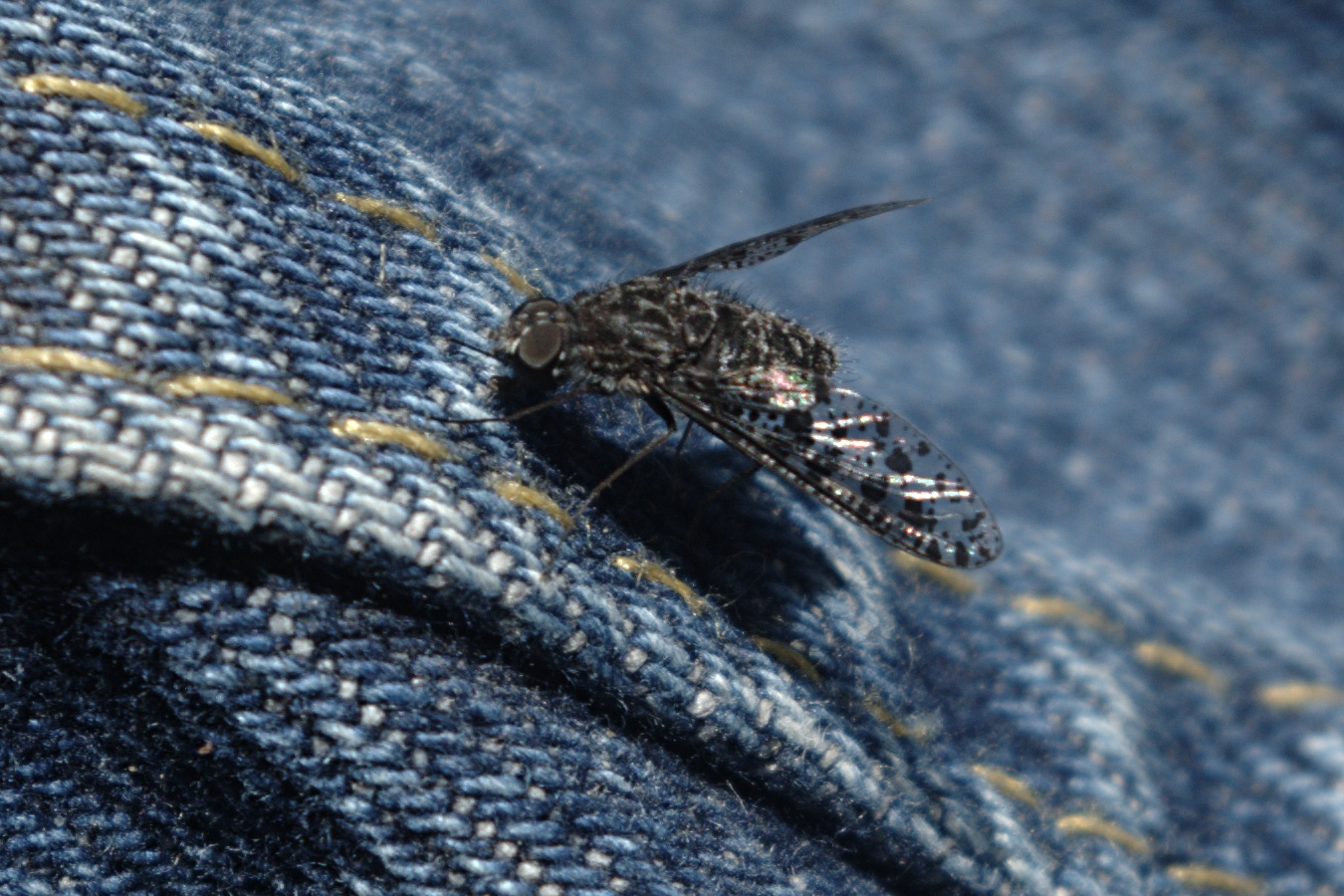
Anthrax flies often hover around people and land on them. This one, a member of A. oedipus or a similar species, landed repeatedly on the photographer's jeans.

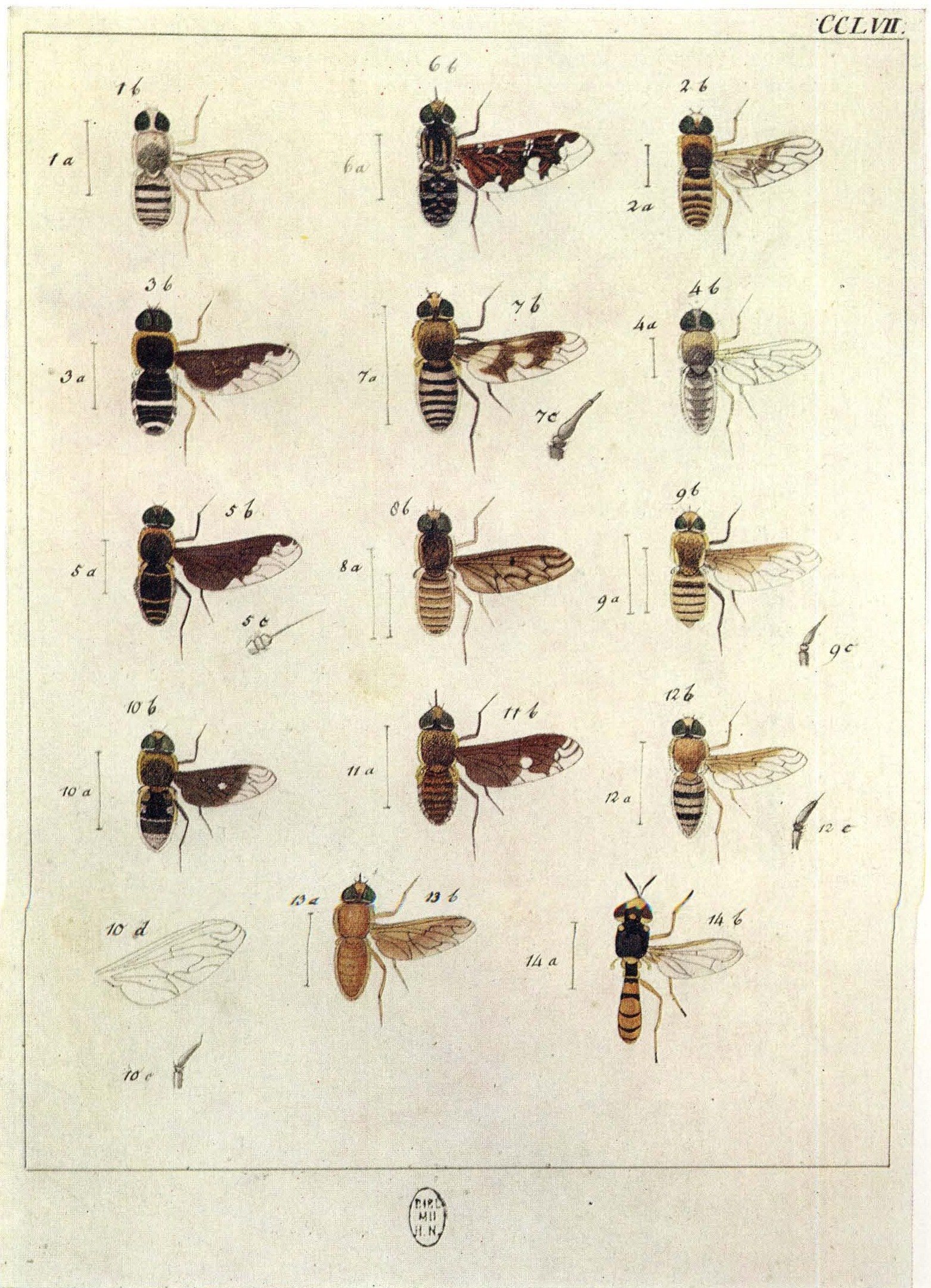
Early conception of the genus Anthrax sensu Meigen.Plate from Johann Wilhelm Meigen Europäischen Zweiflügeligen.The genus is now much more restricted Only one species depicted in this plate is still in Anthrax

- Anthrax actuosus Paramonov, 1935
- Anthrax alagoezicus Paramonov, 1935
- Anthrax albofasciatus Macquart, 1840
- Anthrax alruqibi El-Hawagry, 2013
- Anthrax analis Say, 1823
- Anthrax anthrax (Schrank, 1781)
- Anthrax argentatus (Cole, 1919)
- Anthrax artemesia Marston, 1963
- Anthrax atriplex Marston, 1970
- Anthrax aureosquamosus Marston, 1963
- Anthrax bezzianus Paramonov, 1935
- Anthrax binotatus Wiedemann in Meigen 1820
- Anthrax bowdeni Báez, 1983
- Anthrax cascadensis Marston, 1963
- Anthrax cathetodaithmos Marston, 1970
- Anthrax chaparralus Marston, 1963
- Anthrax chionostigma Tsacas, 1962
- Anthrax cintalapa Cole, 1957
- Anthrax columbiensis Marston, 1963
- Anthrax cybele (Coquillett, 1894)
- Anthrax dentata Becker, 1907
- Anthrax distigma Wiedemann, 1828
- Anthrax francoisi Evenhuis & Greathead, 1999
- Anthrax gideon Fabricius, 1805
- Anthrax giselae François, 1966
- Anthrax greatheadi El-Hawagry, 1998
- Anthrax innublipennis Marston, 1970
- Anthrax irroratus Say, 1823
- Anthrax johanni Zaitzev, 1997
- Anthrax koebelei Marston, 1970
- Anthrax larrea Marston, 1963
- Anthrax laticellus Marston, 1970
- Anthrax melanopogon (Becker, 1892)
- Anthrax moursyi El-Hawagry, 1998
- Anthrax nidicola Cole, 1952
- Anthrax nigriventris Marston, 1970
- Anthrax nitidus Marston, 1970
- Anthrax oedipus Fabricius, 1805
- Anthrax painteri Marston, 1970
- Anthrax pauper (Loew, 1869)
- Anthrax pelopeius François, 1966
- Anthrax picea Marston, 1963
- Anthrax pilosulus Strobl, 1902
- Anthrax plesius (Curran, 1927)
- Anthrax pluricellus Williston, 1901
- Anthrax pluto Wiedemann, 1828
- Anthrax punctulatus Macquart, 1835
- Anthrax seriepunctatus (Osten Sacken, 1886)
- Anthrax slossonae (Johnson, 1913)
- Anthrax snowi Marston, 1970
- Anthrax stellans (Loew, 1869)
- Anthrax sticticus Klug, 1832
- Anthrax striatipennis Marston, 1970
- Anthrax trifasciatus Meigen, 1804
- Anthrax vallicola Marston, 1963
- Anthrax varius Fabricius, 1794
- Anthrax virgo Egger, 1859
- Anthrax zohrayensis El-Hawagry, 2002
- Anthrax zonabriphagus (Portchinsky, 1895
