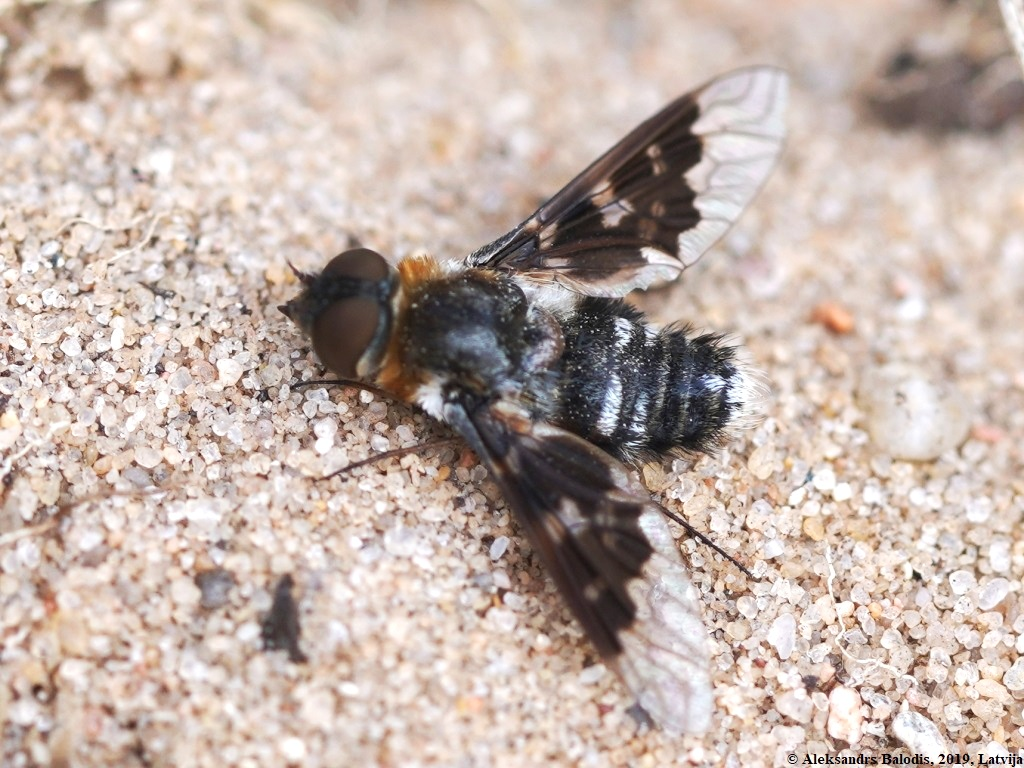
- Thyridanthrax fenestratus

Scientific classification
- Kingdom: Animalia
- Phylum: Arthropoda
- Clade: Pancrustacea
- Class: Insecta
- Order: Diptera
- Family: Bombyliidae
- Genus: Thyridanthrax
- Species: T. fenestratus

Binomial name
- Thyridanthrax fenestratus (Fallen, 1814)

Synonyms
- Anthrax fenestrata Fallén, 1814; Anthrax nigrita var. italica Walker, 1849; Hemipenthes fenestratus var. montana Paramonov, 1927; Anthrax ornatus Hoffmansegg in Wiedemann, 1818; Anthrax ornatus Curtis, 1824; Anthrax variegata Pallas in Wiedemann, 1818

= Thyridanthrax fenestratus =

Species of fly

Thyridanthrax fenestratus is a Palearctic species of bee fly in the family Bombyliidae. It is found throughout Europe, through Greece and Turkey, Azerbaijan, Tajikistan and across the Palearctic to China in the East The larvae are parasitoids of Pemphredon fabricii pupae.

== Description ==
Black. Head slightly prominent, tawny with whitish hairs. Fron with tawny hairs at the front. Antennae: first segment reddish, second and third dark brown. Back of the eyes white. Thorax with tawny hairs at the front and sides; scutellum dark reddish with a broadly black base. Wing: front half brown, with pale yellowish spots at the base and on the cross veins; back half glassy, iridescent. Abdomen: base with white hairs on the sides; tergites III-IV with a broken white band along the middle, tip white. Length 8-12 mm.
