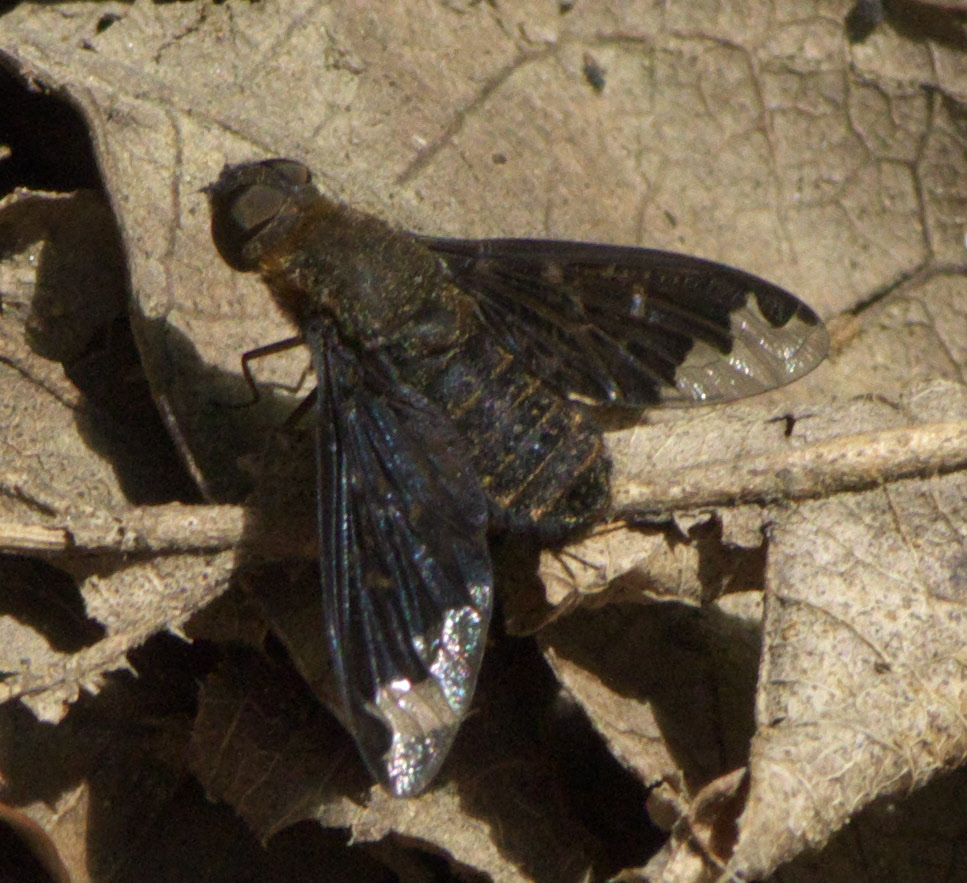
- Hemipenthes sinuosa

Scientific classification
- Kingdom: Animalia
- Phylum: Arthropoda
- Class: Insecta
- Order: Diptera
- Family: Bombyliidae
- Subfamily: Anthracinae
- Tribe: Villini
- Genus: Hemipenthes
- Species: H. sinuosa

Binomial name
- Hemipenthes sinuosa (Wiedemann, 1821)

= Hemipenthes sinuosa =

Species of fly

Hemipenthes sinuosa, the sinuous bee fly, is a species of bee fly in the family Bombyliidae. It is found across North America, including Mexico, the United States, and Canada. It is very similar to the species H. jaennickeana but differs in its wing venation.
