= Dicranoclista =

Scientific classification
- Kingdom: Animalia
- Phylum: Arthropoda
- Clade: Pancrustacea
- Class: Insecta
- Order: Diptera
- Family: Bombyliidae
- Tribe: Anthracini
- Genus: Dicranoclista; Bezzi, 1924

Type species
- Dicranoclista simpsoni Bezzi, 1924

Synonyms
- Coquillettia Williston, 1896 non Uhler, 1890

Genus of flies

Dicranoclista is a genus of bee flies in the family Bombyliidae, found in North America and Africa. There are four described species in Dicranoclista.

== Species ==
As of 2015, four species are recognized:

- Dicranoclista auliae Greathead, 1993 — Sudan
- Dicranoclista fasciata Johnson & Johnson, 1960 — USA (Ariz., Idaho, Ore., Utah, Wash.), Canada (BC)
- Dicranoclista simpsoni Bezzi, 1924 — Gambia, Senegal
- Dicranoclista vandykei (Coquillett, 1894) — USA (Calif., Texas, Wyo.)
