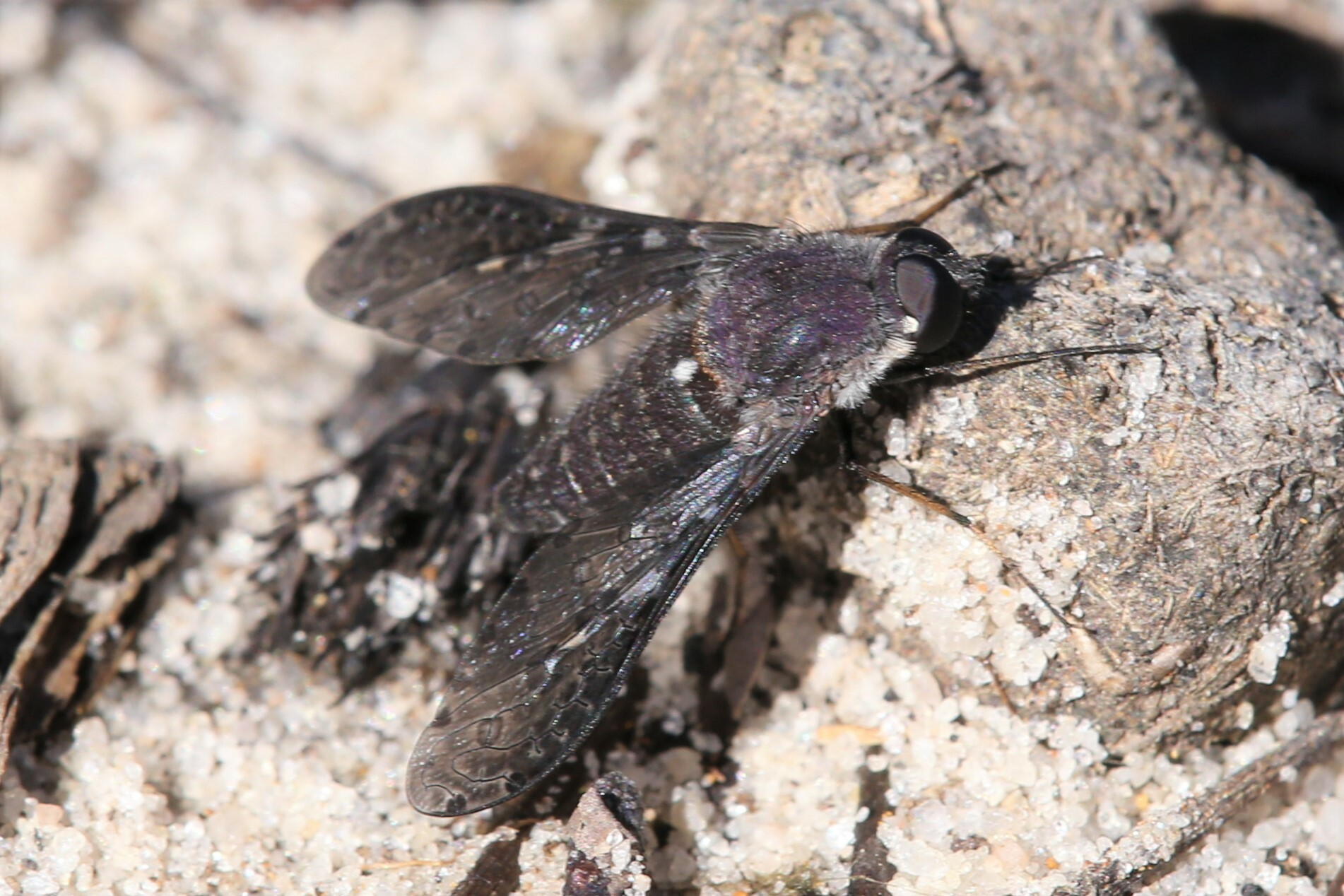
- Aleucosia norrisi

Scientific classification
- Domain: Eukaryota
- Kingdom: Animalia
- Phylum: Arthropoda
- Class: Insecta
- Order: Diptera
- Family: Bombyliidae
- Subfamily: Lomatiinae

= Lomatiinae (fly) =

Subfamily of flies

Lomatiinae is a subfamily of bee flies in the family Bombyliidae. There are about 16 genera and at least 290 described species in Lomatiinae.

== Genera ==
These 16 genera belong to the subfamily Lomatiinae:

- Aleucosia Edwards, 1934^{c g}
- Anisotamia Macquart, 1840^{c g}
- Brachydemia Hull, 1973^{c g}
- Bryodemina Hull, 1973^{i c g}
- Canariellum Strand, 1928^{c g}
- Comptosia Macquart, 1840^{c g}
- Doddosia Edwards, 1934^{c g}
- Edmundiella Becker, 1915^{c g}
- Lomatia Meigen, 1822^{c g}
- Macrocondyla Rondani, 1863^{c g}
- Notolomatia Greathead, 1998^{c g}
- Ogcodocera Macquart, 1840^{i c g b}
- Oncodosia Edwards, 1934^{c g}
- Peringueyimyia Bigot, 1886^{c g}
- Ylasoia Speiser, 1920^{c g}
- † Alomatia Cockerell, 1914^{c g}

Data sources: i=ITIS, c=Catalogue of Life, g=GBIF, b=Bugguide.net
