= Ogcodocera leucoprocta =

Scientific classification
- Domain: Eukaryota
- Kingdom: Animalia
- Phylum: Arthropoda
- Class: Insecta
- Order: Diptera
- Family: Bombyliidae
- Genus: Ogcodocera
- Species: O. leucoprocta

Binomial name
- Ogcodocera leucoprocta (Wiedemann, 1828)

Synonyms
- Anthrax leucotelus Walker, 1852; Mulio leucoprocta Wiedemann, 1828; Ogcodocera dimidiata Macquart, 1840

Species of fly

Ogcodocera leucoprocta is a species of bee fly in the family Bombyliidae. It is found in Mexico and north through the eastern United States to Quebec.
