= Thyridanthrax luminis =

Scientific classification
- Domain: Eukaryota
- Kingdom: Animalia
- Phylum: Arthropoda
- Class: Insecta
- Order: Diptera
- Family: Bombyliidae
- Genus: Thyridanthrax
- Species: T. luminis

Binomial name
- Thyridanthrax luminis (Hall, 1970)

Synonyms
- Villa luminis Hall, 1970

Species of fly

Thyridanthrax luminis is a species of bee fly in the family Bombyliidae. It is known from California.
