= Thyridanthrax atratus =

Scientific classification
- Kingdom: Animalia
- Phylum: Arthropoda
- Class: Insecta
- Order: Diptera
- Family: Bombyliidae
- Subfamily: Anthracinae
- Tribe: Villini
- Genus: Thyridanthrax
- Species: T. atratus

Binomial name
- Thyridanthrax atratus (Coquillett, 1897)

Synonyms
- Anthrax atrata Coquillett, 1892

Species of fly

Thyridanthrax atratus is a species of bee fly in the family Bombyliidae. It is found in the western United States from California and Nevada north to British Columbia, Canada.
