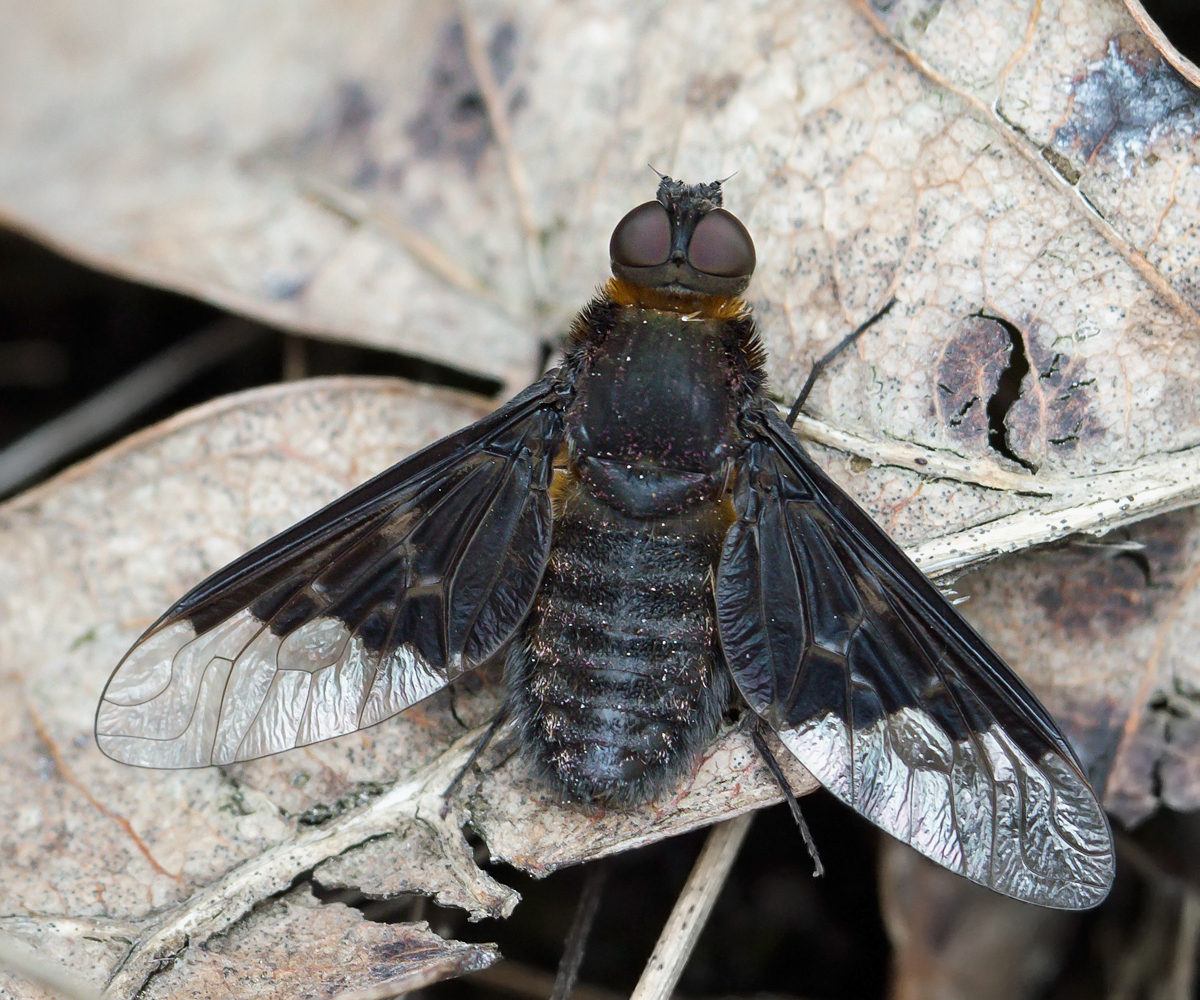

Scientific classification
- Kingdom: Animalia
- Phylum: Arthropoda
- Clade: Pancrustacea
- Class: Insecta
- Order: Diptera
- Family: Bombyliidae
- Genus: Hemipenthes
- Species: H. morio

Binomial name
- Hemipenthes morio (Linnaeus, 1758)

Synonyms
- Anthrax morio (Linnaeus, 1758); Anthrax semiater (Linnaeus, 1758); Musca bicolora Sulzer, 1776; Musca morio Linnaeus, 1758; Villa morio (Linnaeus, 1758)

= Hemipenthes morio =

Species of fly

Hemipenthes morio is a species of bee fly belonging to the family Bombyliidae subfamily Anthracinae.

This common bee-fly is mainly present in most of Europe, the eastern Palearctic realm, and the Near East. It is extremely similar to H. morioides, a species found in North America which was previously considered to be the same species as H. morio.

The adults grow up to 7–10 millimetres (0.28–0.39 in) long, while the wingspan reaches 5–15 millimetres (0.20–0.59 in). They can mostly be encountered from May through August feeding on nectar and pollen of a variety of flowers (for instance of Lavandula stoechas, Cytisus scoparius, Thapsia villosa, etc.).

Their body is dark-brown and hairy, especially on the side of the abdomen. The wings have a light area located near the apex and a dark area close to costal margin, separated by a zig-zag division. The apex of cell R1 is hyaline. The dark area of the wings almost reaches the end of the abdomen.

The larvae are hyperparasites (parasites of parasites), mainly developing in larvae of flies (Diptera, Tachinidae), as well as in wasp larvae (Hymenoptera, Ichneumonidae) parasitizing caterpillars moths (Noctuidae).
