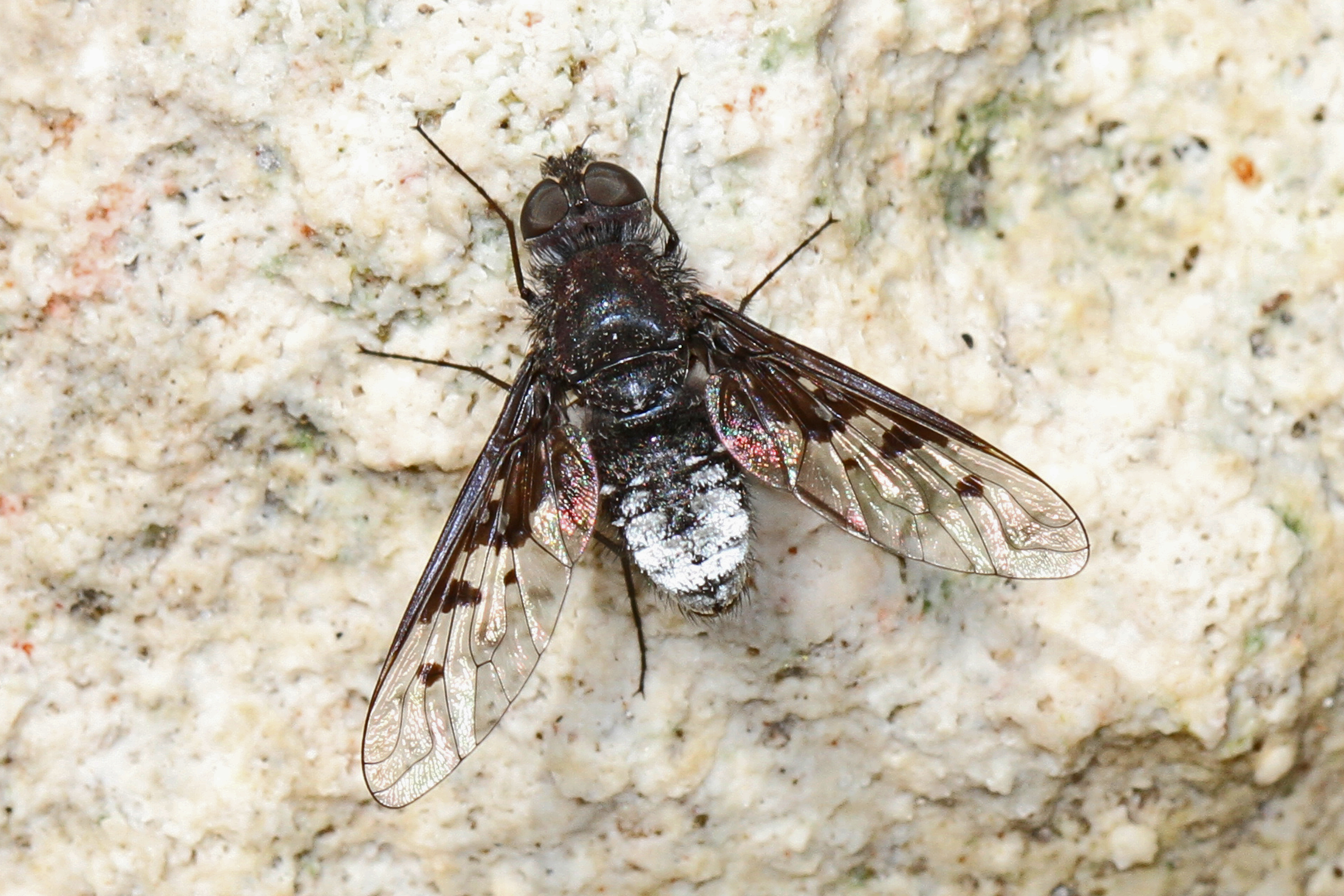
- Anthrax albofasciatus

Scientific classification
- Kingdom: Animalia
- Phylum: Arthropoda
- Class: Insecta
- Order: Diptera
- Superfamily: Asiloidea
- Family: Bombyliidae
- Subfamily: Anthracinae
- Tribe: Anthracini

= Anthracini =

Tribe of flies

Anthracini is a tribe of bee flies in the family Bombyliidae.

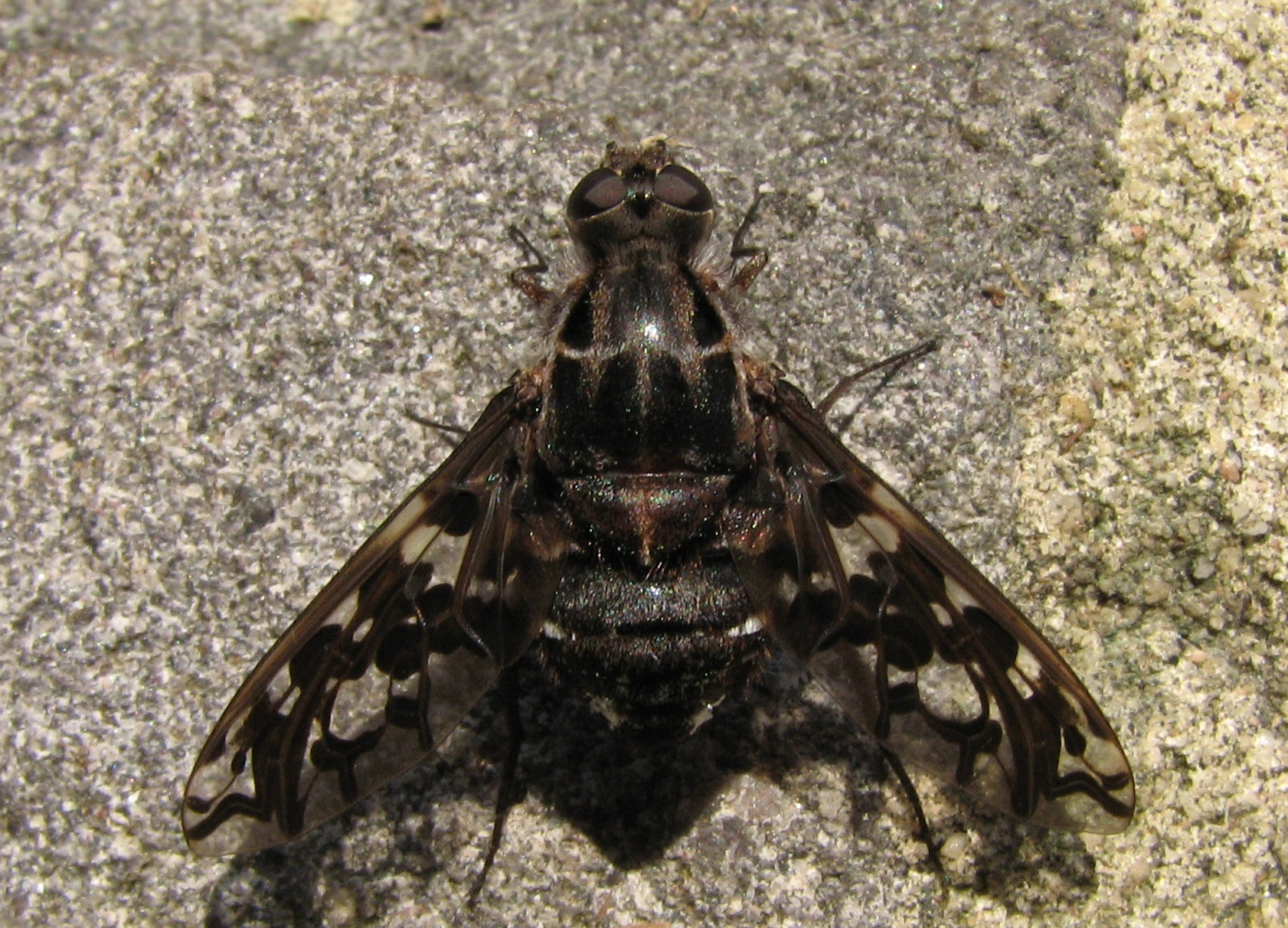
Xenox tigrinus

== Genera ==
- Anthrax Scopoli, 1763
- Brachyanax Evenhuis, 1981
- Dicranoclista Bezzi, 1924
- Satyramoeba Sack, 1909
- Spogostylum Macquart, 1840
- Thraxan Yeates & Lambkin, 1998
- Turkmeniella Paramonov, 1940
- Walkeromyia Paramonov, 1934
- Xenox Evenhuis, 1985
