= List of Therevidae genera =

This is a list of 132 genera in the family Therevidae, stiletto flies.

== Therevidae genera ==
- Acantothereva ^{c g}
- Acathrito ^{c g}
- Acatopygia ^{c g}
- Acraspisa ^{c g}
- Acraspisoides ^{c g}
- Acrosathe Irwin & Lyneborg, 1981^{i c g b}
- Actenomeros ^{c g}
- Actorthia ^{c g}
- Acupalpa ^{c g}
- Agapophytus ^{c g}
- Ambradolon Metz & Irwin, 2000^{g}
- Ammonaios Irwin & Lyneborg, 1981^{i c g b}
- Ammothereva ^{c g}
- Amplisegmentum ^{c g}
- Anabarhynchus ^{c g}
- Anolinga ^{c g}
- Apenniverpa ^{c g}
- Araeopus Spinola, 1839^{i c g}
- Arctogephyra Hauser, 2007^{g}
- Arenigena Irwin & Lyneborg, 1981^{i c g b}
- Argolepida ^{c g}
- Aristothereva ^{c g}
- Ataenogera ^{i c g}
- Baryphora ^{c g}
- Belonalys ^{c g}
- Bibio ^{i c g}
- Bonjeania ^{c g}
- Brachylinga Irwin & Lyneborg, 1981^{i c g b}
- Braunsophila ^{c g}
- Breviperna Irwin, 1977^{i c g b}
- Bugulaverpa ^{c g}
- Caenophthalmus ^{c g}
- Calophytus ^{c g}
- Ceratosathe ^{c g}
- Chromolepida Cole, 1923^{i c g b}
- Chrysanthemyia ^{c g}
- Cionophora ^{c g}
- Cliorismia ^{c g}
- Cochlodactyla ^{c g}
- Coleiana ^{c g}
- Collessiama Lambkin, 2013^{g}
- Cyclotelus Walker, 1850^{i c g b}
- Delphacura ^{c g}
- Dialineura ^{i c g}
- Dichoglena ^{i c g}
- Dimassus Walker, 1850^{g}
- Distostylus ^{c g}
- Ectinorhynchus ^{c g}
- Efflatouniella ^{c g}
- Elcaribe ^{c g}
- Entesia ^{c g}
- Euphycus ^{c g}
- Eupsilocephala ^{c g}
- Glaesorthactia Hennig, 1967^{g}
- Hemigephyra ^{c g}
- Henicomyia Coquillett, 1898^{i c g b}
- Hermannula ^{c g}
- Hoplosathe ^{c g}
- Iberotelus ^{c g}
- Insulatitan ^{c g}
- Irwiniella ^{c g}
- Jeanchazeauia ^{c g}
- Johnmannia ^{c g}
- Kroeberiella Hauser, 2007^{g}
- Laxotela ^{c g}
- Lindneria ^{c g}
- Litolinga Irwin & Lyneborg, 1981^{i c g b}
- Lyneborgia ^{c g}
- Lysilinga Irwin & Lyneborg, 1981^{i c g b}
- Manestella ^{c g}
- Medomega Winterton & Lambkin, 2012^{g}
- Megalinga ^{i c g}
- Megapalla ^{c g}
- Megathereva ^{c g}
- Melanacrosathe ^{c g}
- Melanothereva ^{i c g}
- Microgephyra ^{c g}
- Microthereva ^{c g}
- Nanexila ^{c g}
- Nebritus Coquillett, 1894^{i c g b}
- Neodialineura ^{c g}
- Neophycus ^{c g}
- Neotabuda ^{c g}
- Neotherevella ^{c g}
- Nesonana ^{c g}
- Nigranitida ^{c g}
- Notiothereva ^{c g}
- Orthactia ^{c g}
- Ozodiceromya ^{i c g}
- Ozodiceromyia ^{b}
- Pachyrrhiza ^{c g}
- Palaeopherocera Hauser & Irwin, 2005^{g b}
- Pallicephala ^{i c g}
- Pandivirilia Irwin & Lyneborg, 1981^{i c g b}
- Parapherocera ^{i c g}
- Parapsilocephala ^{c g}
- Patanothrix ^{c g}
- Penniverpa Irwin & Lyneborg, 1981^{i c g b}
- Pentheria ^{c g}
- Peralia ^{c g}
- Peratrimera Hauser & Irwin, 2005^{g}
- Pherocera Cole, 1923^{i c g b}
- Phycus ^{i c g}
- Pipinnipons ^{c g}
- Procyclotelus ^{c g}
- Protothereva ^{c g}
- Pseudothereva ^{c g}
- Psilocephala ^{i c g}
- Ptilotophallos ^{c g}
- Rhagioforma ^{i c g}
- Ruppellia ^{c g}
- Salentia ^{c g}
- Salwaea Winterton, Hauser & Badrawy, 2012^{g}
- Schlingeria ^{i c g}
- Schoutedenomyia ^{c g}
- Sidarena ^{g}
- Sigalopella ^{c g}
- Sinothereva ^{c g}
- Spinalobus ^{c g}
- Spiracolis ^{c g}
- Spiriverpa Irwin & Lyneborg, 1981^{i c g b}
- Squamopygia ^{c g}
- Stenogephyra ^{c g}
- Stenopomyia ^{c g}
- Stenosathe ^{c g}
- Tabuda Walker, 1852^{i c g b}
- Tabudamima ^{i c g}
- Taenogera ^{c g}
- Taenogerella ^{c g}
- Thereva Latreille, 1797^{i c g b}
- Vomerina ^{c g}
- Winthemmyia ^{c g}
- Xestomyza ^{c g}
- Xestomyzina ^{c g}
- Zelothrix ^{g}

Data sources: i = ITIS, c = Catalogue of Life, g = GBIF, b = Bugguide.net
