= Tabuda varia =

Scientific classification
- Kingdom: Animalia
- Phylum: Arthropoda
- Class: Insecta
- Order: Diptera
- Family: Therevidae
- Genus: Tabuda
- Species: T. varia

Binomial name
- Tabuda varia (Walker, 1848)

Synonyms
- Tabuda fulvipes Walker, 1852; Thereva nervosa Walker, 1848; Thereva varia Walker, 1848

Species of fly

Tabuda varia is a species of stiletto flies in the family Therevidae.
