= Nebritus tanneri =

Scientific classification
- Domain: Eukaryota
- Kingdom: Animalia
- Phylum: Arthropoda
- Class: Insecta
- Order: Diptera
- Family: Therevidae
- Genus: Nebritus
- Species: N. tanneri

Binomial name
- Nebritus tanneri (Hardy, 1938)

Synonyms
- Zionea tanneri Hardy, 1938

Species of fly

Nebritus tanneri is a species of stiletto flies in the family Therevidae.
