= Thereva hirticeps =

Scientific classification
- Domain: Eukaryota
- Kingdom: Animalia
- Phylum: Arthropoda
- Class: Insecta
- Order: Diptera
- Family: Therevidae
- Genus: Thereva
- Species: T. hirticeps

Binomial name
- Thereva hirticeps Loew, 1874

Species of fly

Thereva hirticeps is a species of stiletto flies in the family Therevidae.
