= Tabuda planiceps =

Scientific classification
- Domain: Eukaryota
- Kingdom: Animalia
- Phylum: Arthropoda
- Class: Insecta
- Order: Diptera
- Family: Therevidae
- Genus: Tabuda
- Species: T. planiceps

Binomial name
- Tabuda planiceps (Loew, 1872)

Synonyms
- Xestomyza planiceps Loew, 1872

Species of fly

Tabuda planiceps is a species of stiletto flies in the family Therevidae.
