= Chromolepida bella =

Scientific classification
- Domain: Eukaryota
- Kingdom: Animalia
- Phylum: Arthropoda
- Class: Insecta
- Order: Diptera
- Family: Therevidae
- Genus: Chromolepida
- Species: C. bella

Binomial name
- Chromolepida bella Cole, 1923

Species of fly

Chromolepida bella is a species of stiletto fly in the family Therevidae.
