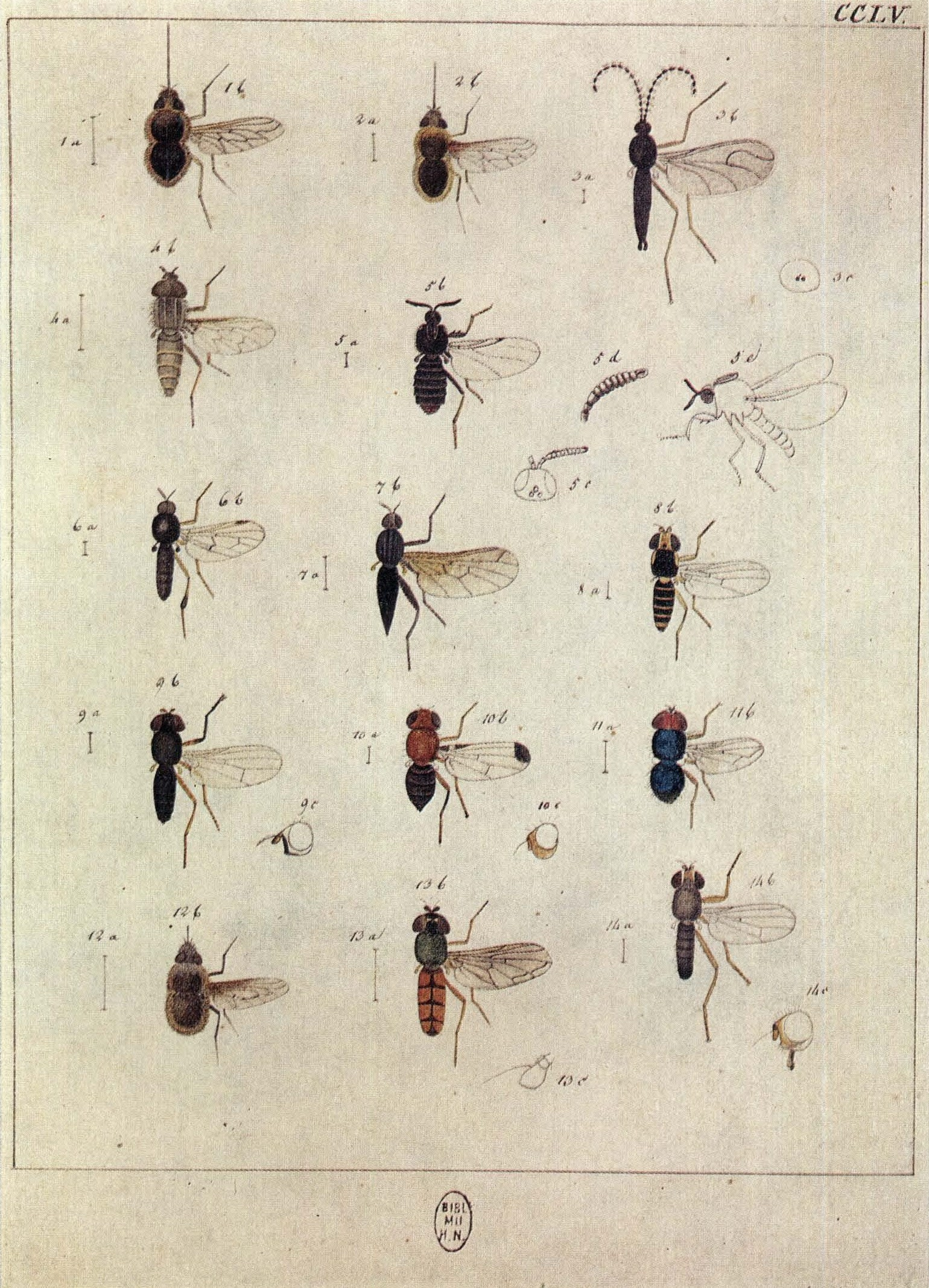
- Thereva cinifera in Europäischen Zweiflügeligen

Scientific classification
- Kingdom: Animalia
- Phylum: Arthropoda
- Clade: Pancrustacea
- Class: Insecta
- Order: Diptera
- Family: Therevidae
- Genus: Thereva
- Species: T. cinifera

Binomial name
- Thereva cinifera Meigen, 1830

= Thereva cinifera =

Species of fly

Thereva cinifera is a Palearctic species of stiletto fly in the family Therevidae.
