= Nebritus pellucidus =

Scientific classification
- Domain: Eukaryota
- Kingdom: Animalia
- Phylum: Arthropoda
- Class: Insecta
- Order: Diptera
- Family: Therevidae
- Genus: Nebritus
- Species: N. pellucidus

Binomial name
- Nebritus pellucidus Coquillett, 1894

Species of fly

Nebritus pellucidus is a species of stiletto flies in the family Therevidae.
