= Pherocera flavipes =

Scientific classification
- Domain: Eukaryota
- Kingdom: Animalia
- Phylum: Arthropoda
- Class: Insecta
- Order: Diptera
- Family: Therevidae
- Genus: Pherocera
- Species: P. flavipes

Binomial name
- Pherocera flavipes Cole, 1923

Species of fly

Pherocera flavipes is a species of stiletto flies (insects in the family Therevidae).
