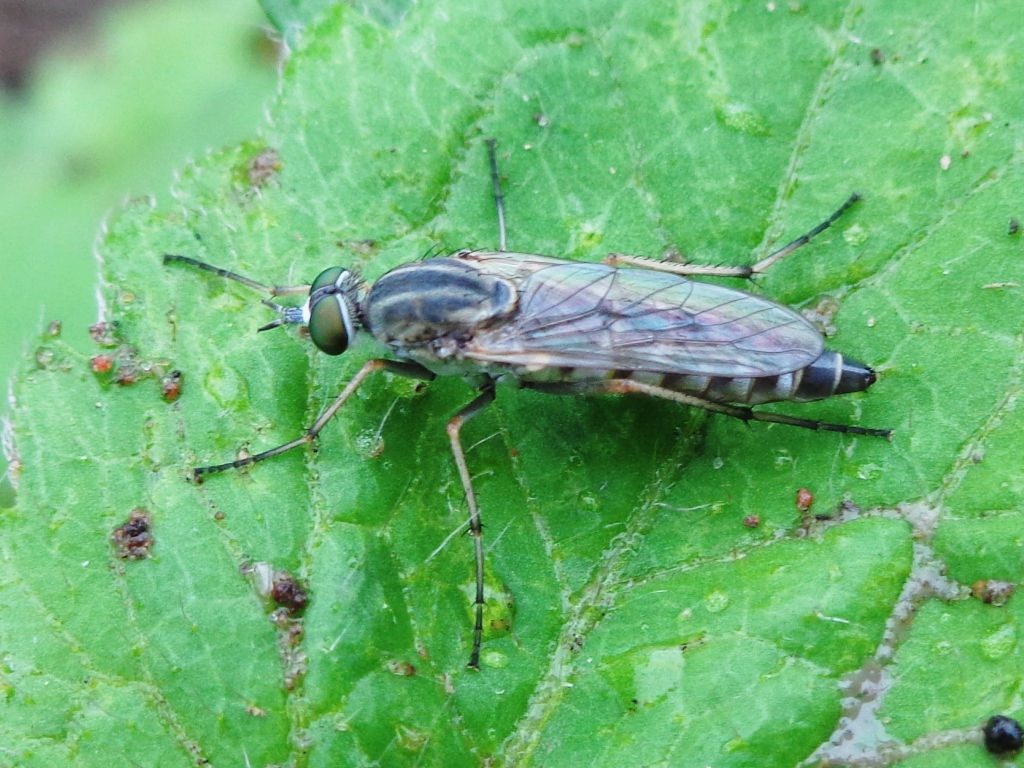
- Thereva plebeja Latvia

Scientific classification
- Kingdom: Animalia
- Phylum: Arthropoda
- Class: Insecta
- Order: Diptera
- Family: Therevidae
- Genus: Thereva
- Species: T. plebeja

Binomial name
- Thereva plebeja (Linnaeus, 1758)

Synonyms
- Thereva lichtwardti Krober, 1913; Thereva lugens Loew, 1847; Tabanus intersectus Geoffroy, 1785; Bibio marginata Fabricius, 1781; Nemotelus monos Harris, 1780; Nemotelus fasciatus De Geer, 1776

= Thereva plebeja =

Species of fly

Thereva plebeja is a Palearctic species of stiletto fly in the family Therevidae.
