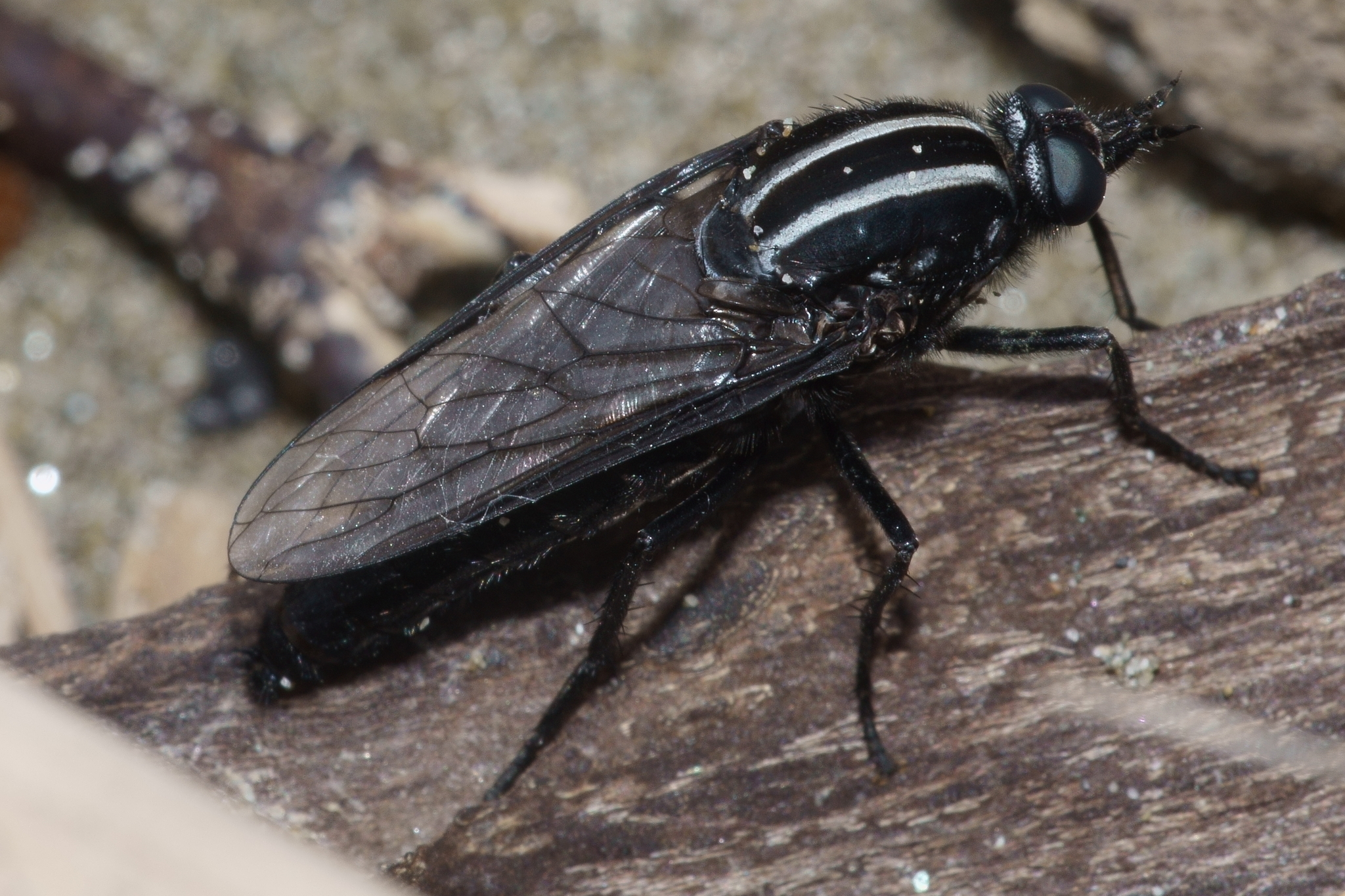
- Megathereva atritibia

Scientific classification
- Kingdom: Animalia
- Phylum: Arthropoda
- Clade: Pancrustacea
- Class: Insecta
- Order: Diptera
- Family: Therevidae
- Subfamily: Therevinae
- Genus: Megathereva; Lyneborg, 1992

= Megathereva =

Genus of fly

Megathereva is a genus of Therevidae endemic to New Zealand. There are 3 described species as of 2025:

== Species ==
- Megathereva albopilosa Lyneborg, 1992
- Megathereva atritibia Lyneborg, 1992
- Megathereva bilineata (Fabricius, 1775)
