= Cyclotelus rufiventris =

Scientific classification
- Domain: Eukaryota
- Kingdom: Animalia
- Phylum: Arthropoda
- Class: Insecta
- Order: Diptera
- Family: Therevidae
- Genus: Cyclotelus
- Species: C. rufiventris

Binomial name
- Cyclotelus rufiventris (Loew, 1869)

Synonyms
- Psilocephala lacteipennis Krober, 1914; Psilocephala rufiventris Loew, 1869

Species of fly

Cyclotelus rufiventris is a species of stiletto flies in the family Therevidae.
