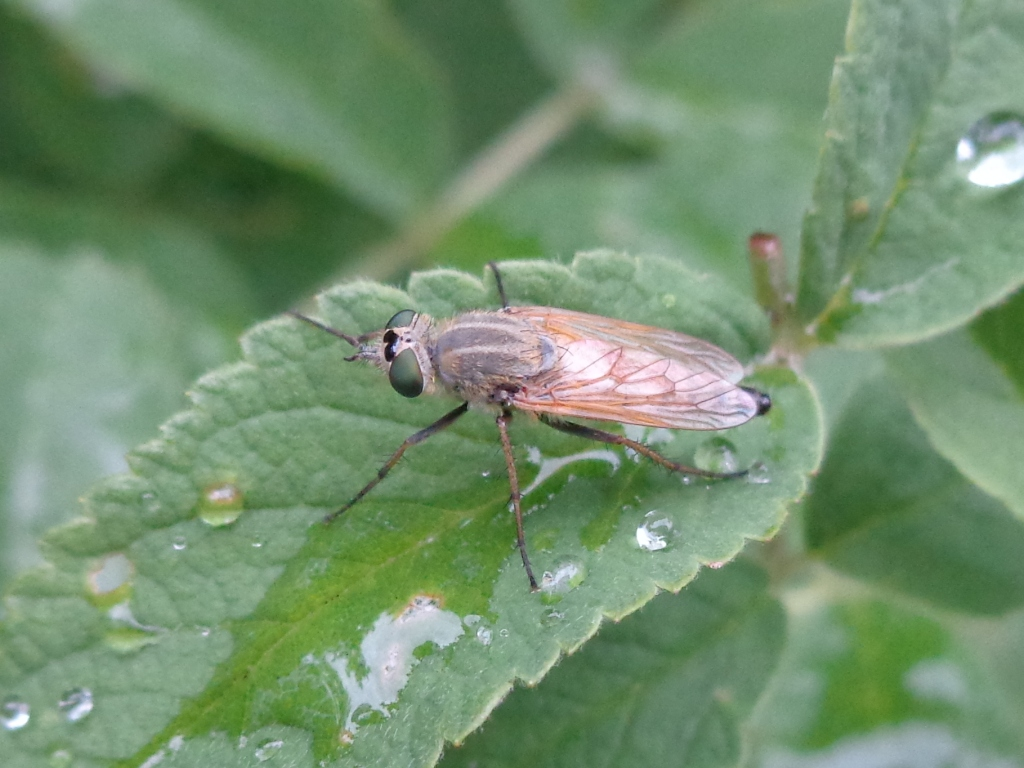
- Thereva handlirschi Latvia

Scientific classification
- Domain: Eukaryota
- Kingdom: Animalia
- Phylum: Arthropoda
- Class: Insecta
- Order: Diptera
- Family: Therevidae
- Genus: Thereva
- Species: T. handlirschi

Binomial name
- Thereva handlirschi Krober, 1912

Synonyms
- Thereva praestans Collin, 1948; Thereva zonata Kröber, 1912; Thereva angustifrons Kröber, 1912

= Thereva handlirschi =

Species of fly

Thereva handlirschi is a Palearctic species of stiletto fly in the family Therevidae.
