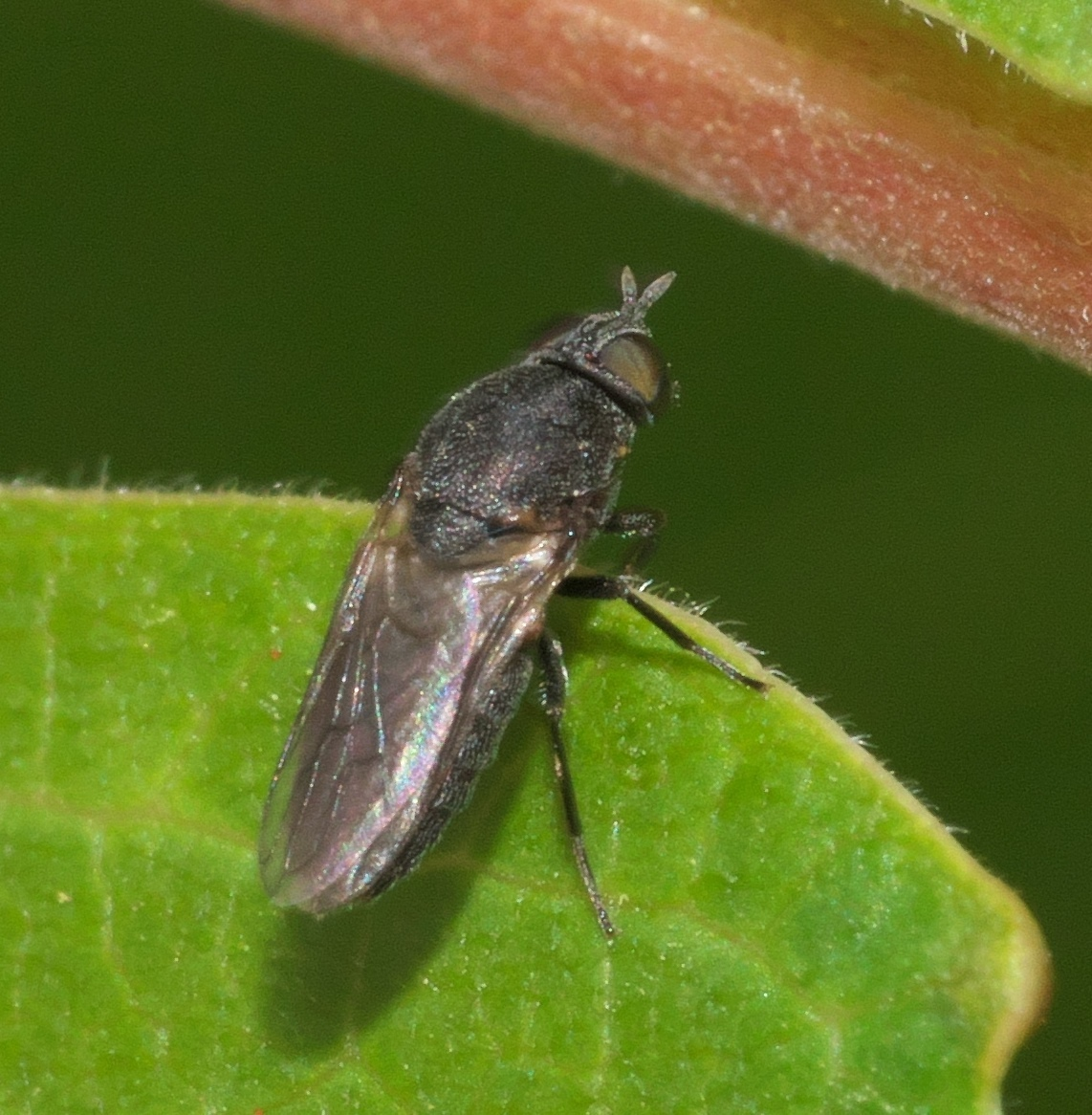
- Metatrichia bulbosa, California

Scientific classification
- Domain: Eukaryota
- Kingdom: Animalia
- Phylum: Arthropoda
- Class: Insecta
- Order: Diptera
- Family: Scenopinidae
- Genus: Metatrichia
- Species: M. bulbosa

Binomial name
- Metatrichia bulbosa (Osten-Sacken, 1877)

Synonyms
- Scenopinus bulbosa Osten Sacken, 1877

= Metatrichia bulbosa =

Species of fly

Metatrichia bulbosa is a species of window flies in the family Scenopinidae.
