= Cyclotelus hardyi =

Scientific classification
- Domain: Eukaryota
- Kingdom: Animalia
- Phylum: Arthropoda
- Class: Insecta
- Order: Diptera
- Family: Therevidae
- Genus: Cyclotelus
- Species: C. hardyi

Binomial name
- Cyclotelus hardyi (Cole, 1960)

Synonyms
- Epomyia flavipes Hardy, 1943; Furcifera hardyi Cole, 1960

Species of fly

Cyclotelus hardyi is a species of stiletto flies in the family Therevidae.
