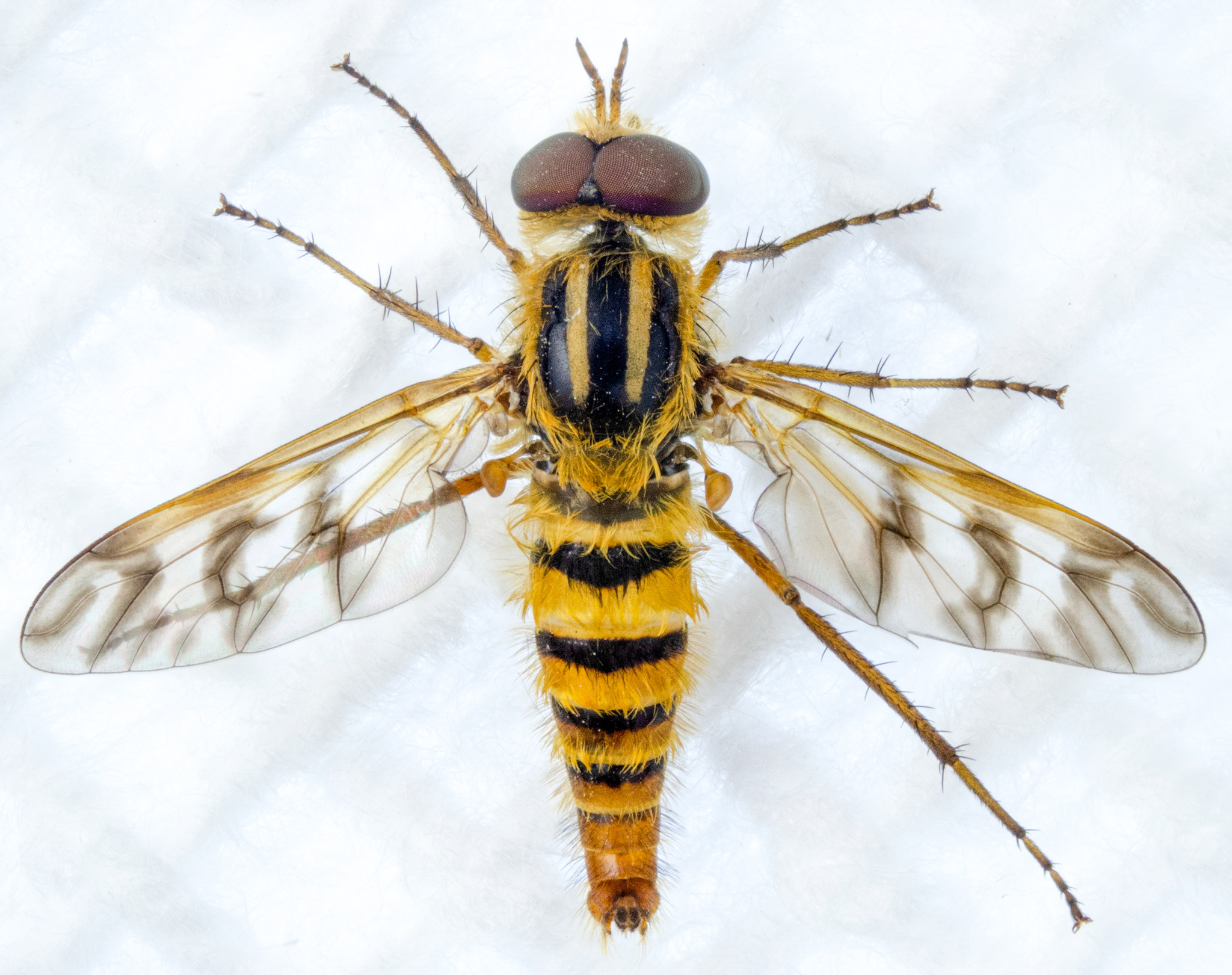

Scientific classification
- Domain: Eukaryota
- Kingdom: Animalia
- Phylum: Arthropoda
- Class: Insecta
- Order: Diptera
- Family: Therevidae
- Genus: Thereva
- Species: T. fucata

Binomial name
- Thereva fucata Loew, 1872

= Thereva fucata =

Species of insect

Thereva fucata is a species of stiletto-fly in the family Therevidae.
