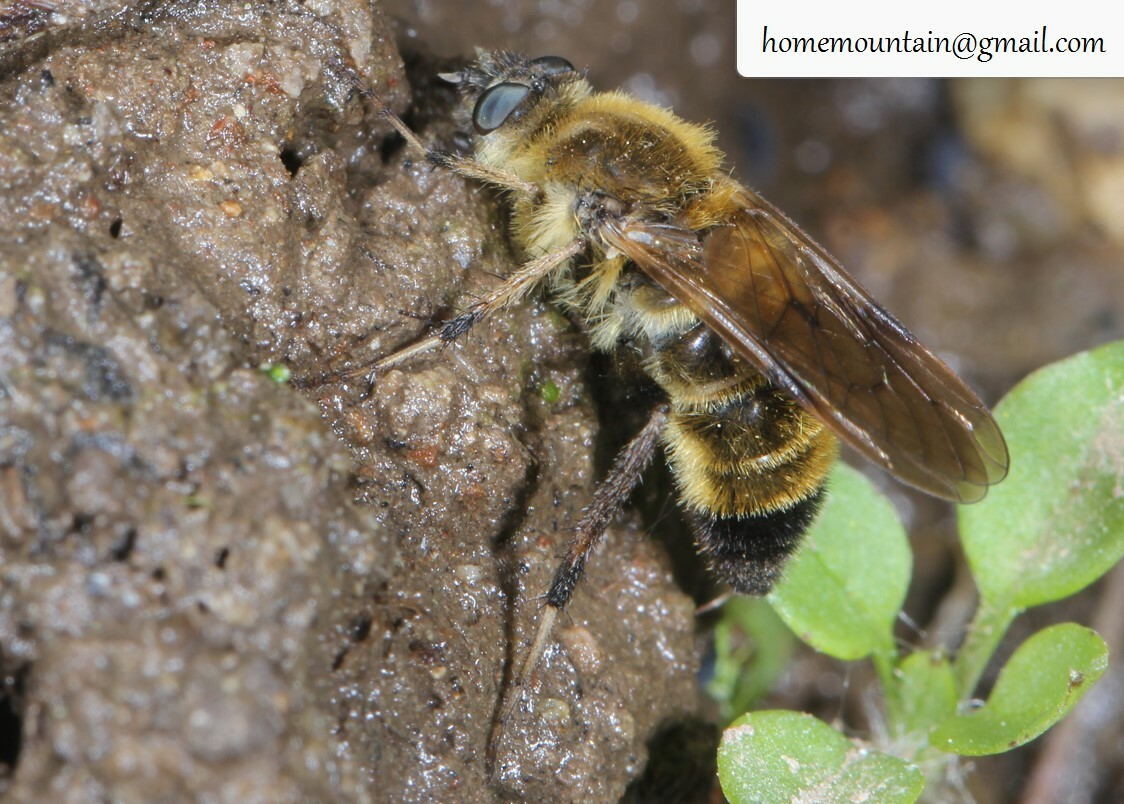

Scientific classification
- Domain: Eukaryota
- Kingdom: Animalia
- Phylum: Arthropoda
- Class: Insecta
- Order: Diptera
- Family: Therevidae
- Subfamily: Therevinae
- Genus: Sinothereva; Winterton, 2020
- Species: S. shangui

Binomial name
- Sinothereva shangui Winterton, 2020

= Sinothereva =

Sinothereva shangui

Genus of flies

Sinothereva is a genus of stiletto flies in the family Therevidae. It is monotypic, being represented by the single species Sinothereva shangui, which has been given the common name mountain ghost stiletto fly. It is endemic to north-eastern China, where it has been found at mid-elevations.

Sinothereva shangui was named for the photographer Shan Gui, who posted images of the live fly to iNaturalist that enabled the original author to describe the new species.

Unlike other species of stiletto flies that mimic wasps, Sinothereva shangui resembles nearby species of bumble bees (Bombus sibiricus and Bombus hypnorum).
