= Chromolepida mexicana =

Scientific classification
- Domain: Eukaryota
- Kingdom: Animalia
- Phylum: Arthropoda
- Class: Insecta
- Order: Diptera
- Family: Therevidae
- Genus: Chromolepida
- Species: C. mexicana

Binomial name
- Chromolepida mexicana Cole, 1923

Species of fly

Chromolepida mexicana is a species of stiletto flies in the family Therevidae.
