= Brachylinga pavida =

Scientific classification
- Domain: Eukaryota
- Kingdom: Animalia
- Phylum: Arthropoda
- Class: Insecta
- Order: Diptera
- Family: Therevidae
- Genus: Brachylinga
- Species: B. pavida

Binomial name
- Brachylinga pavida (Coquillett, 1893)

Synonyms
- Psilocephala pavida Coquillett, 1893

Species of fly

Brachylinga pavida is a species of stiletto flies in the family Therevidae.
