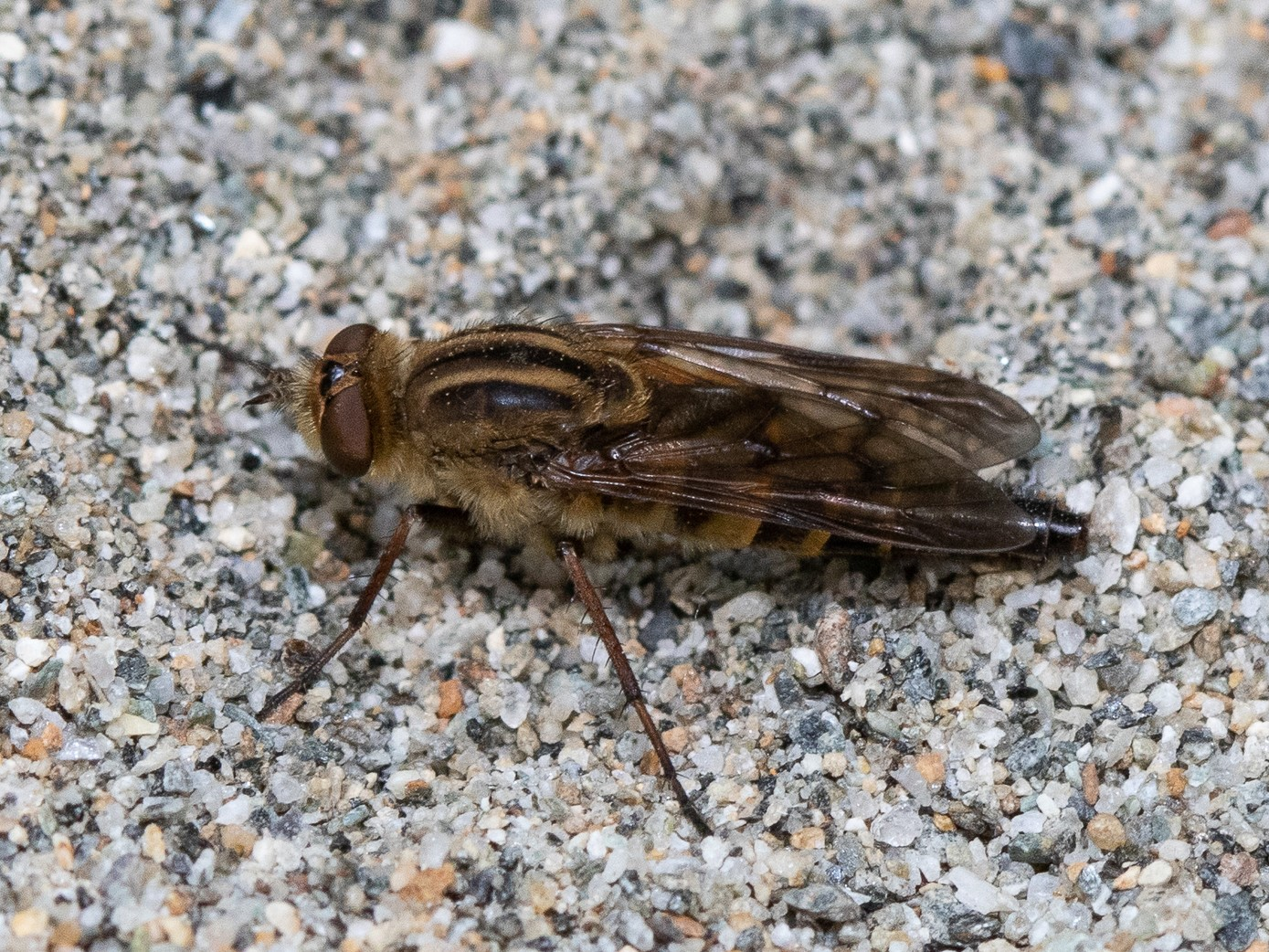

Scientific classification
- Kingdom: Animalia
- Phylum: Arthropoda
- Class: Insecta
- Order: Diptera
- Family: Therevidae
- Genus: Thereva
- Species: T. brunnea

Binomial name
- Thereva brunnea Cole, 1923

= Thereva brunnea =

Species of fly

Thereva brunnea is a species of stiletto fly in the family Therevidae.
