= Thereva strigata =

Scientific classification
- Domain: Eukaryota
- Kingdom: Animalia
- Phylum: Arthropoda
- Class: Insecta
- Order: Diptera
- Family: Therevidae
- Genus: Thereva
- Species: T. strigata

Binomial name
- Thereva strigata (Fabricius, 1794)

Species of fly

Thereva strigata is a Palearctic species of stiletto fly in the family Therevidae.
