= Pandivirilia melaleuca =

Scientific classification
- Kingdom: Animalia
- Phylum: Arthropoda
- Clade: Pancrustacea
- Class: Insecta
- Order: Diptera
- Family: Therevidae
- Genus: Pandivirilia
- Species: P. melaleuca

Binomial name
- Pandivirilia melaleuca (Loew, 1847)

Species of fly

Pandivirilia melaleuca is a Palearctic species of stiletto fly in the family Therevidae.

== Identification ==
A small shiny strip extends over the frons and the vertex. Male genitalia differentiate (surstylus elongate and curved, with fine setulae along the inner margin). Males have a silver abdomen, and entirely black femora with a silver dusting.Females have a black abdomen with pale grey triangles on tergites 2 and 3 and grey side patches on tergites 5-8.
