= Thereva valida =

Scientific classification
- Kingdom: Animalia
- Phylum: Arthropoda
- Class: Insecta
- Order: Diptera
- Family: Therevidae
- Genus: Thereva
- Species: T. valida

Binomial name
- Thereva valida Loew, 1847

Species of fly

Thereva valida is a Palearctic species of stiletto fly in the family Therevidae.
