= Penniverpa festina =

Scientific classification
- Domain: Eukaryota
- Kingdom: Animalia
- Phylum: Arthropoda
- Class: Insecta
- Order: Diptera
- Family: Therevidae
- Genus: Penniverpa
- Species: P. festina

Binomial name
- Penniverpa festina (Coquillett, 1893)

Synonyms
- Psilocephala festina Coquillett, 1893

Species of fly

Penniverpa festina is a species of stiletto flies in the family Therevidae.
