= Thereva inornata =

Scientific classification
- Domain: Eukaryota
- Kingdom: Animalia
- Phylum: Arthropoda
- Class: Insecta
- Order: Diptera
- Family: Therevidae
- Genus: Thereva
- Species: T. inornata

Binomial name
- Thereva inornata Verrall, 1909

Species of fly

Thereva inornata is a Palearctic species of stiletto fly in the family Therevidae.
