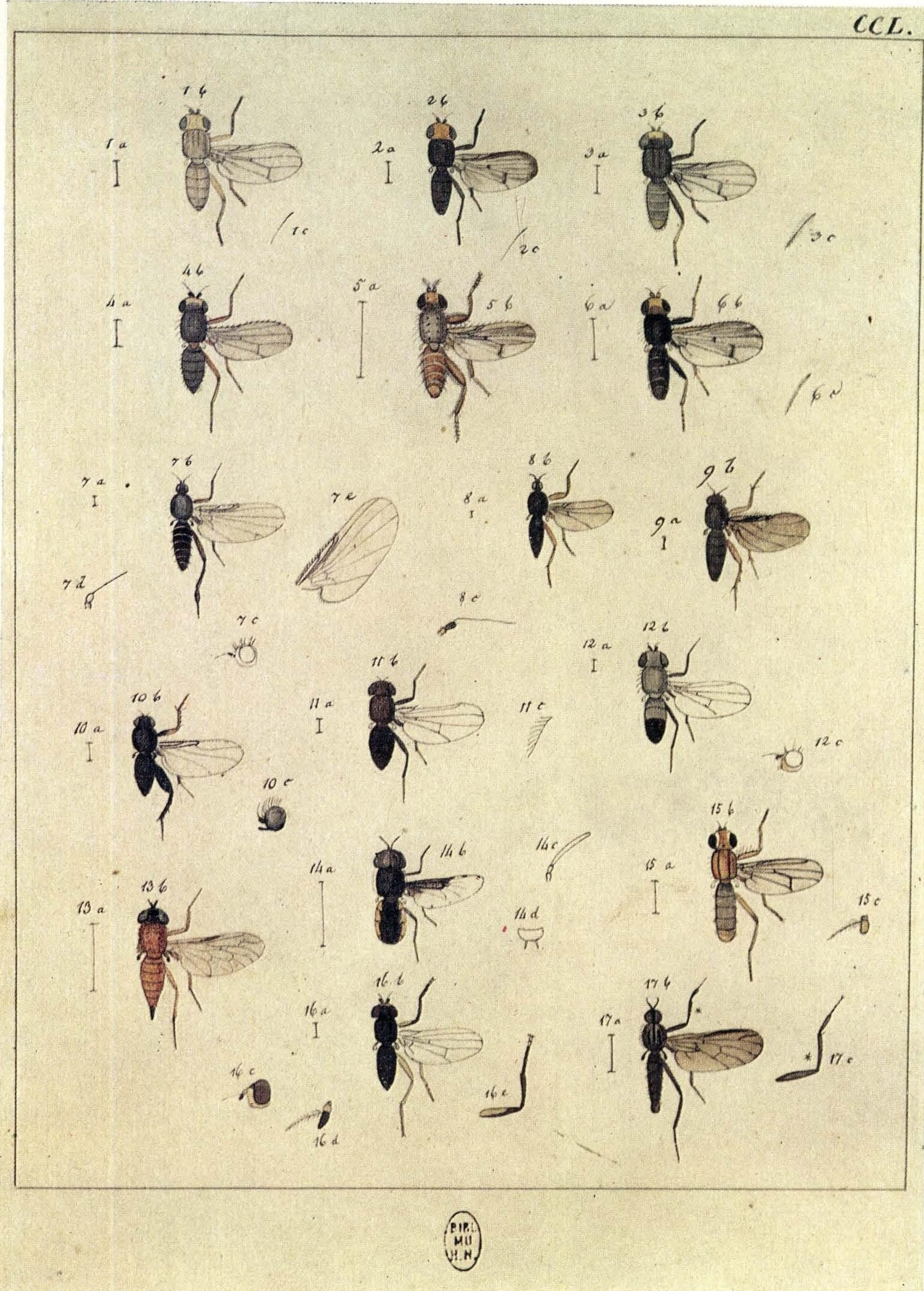
- Thereva fulva in Meigen Europäischen Zweiflügeligen

Scientific classification
- Kingdom: Animalia
- Phylum: Arthropoda
- Class: Insecta
- Order: Diptera
- Family: Therevidae
- Genus: Thereva
- Species: T. fulva

Binomial name
- Thereva fulva ( Meigen, 1804)

Synonyms
- Bibio fulva Meigen, 1804; Thereva flavilabris Meigen, 1820

= Thereva fulva =

Species of fly

Thereva fulva is a Palearctic species of stiletto fly in the family Therevidae.
