= Cyclotelus pictipennis =

Scientific classification
- Domain: Eukaryota
- Kingdom: Animalia
- Phylum: Arthropoda
- Class: Insecta
- Order: Diptera
- Family: Therevidae
- Genus: Cyclotelus
- Species: C. pictipennis

Binomial name
- Cyclotelus pictipennis (Wiedemann, 1821)

Synonyms
- Psilocephala erythrura Loew, 1869; Thereva pictipennis Wiedemann, 1821

Species of fly

Cyclotelus pictipennis is a species of stiletto flies in the family Therevidae.
