= Acrosathe vialis =

Scientific classification
- Domain: Eukaryota
- Kingdom: Animalia
- Phylum: Arthropoda
- Class: Insecta
- Order: Diptera
- Family: Therevidae
- Genus: Acrosathe
- Species: A. vialis

Binomial name
- Acrosathe vialis (Osten Sacken, 1877)

Synonyms
- Thereva vialis Osten Sacken, 1877

Species of fly

Acrosathe vialis is a species of stiletto fly in the family Therevidae.
