= Litolinga tergisa =

Scientific classification
- Domain: Eukaryota
- Kingdom: Animalia
- Phylum: Arthropoda
- Class: Insecta
- Order: Diptera
- Family: Therevidae
- Genus: Litolinga
- Species: L. tergisa

Binomial name
- Litolinga tergisa (Say, 1823)

Synonyms
- Thereva corusca Wiedemann, 1828; Thereva tergisa Say, 1823

Species of fly

Litolinga tergisa is a species of stiletto flies in the family Therevidae.
