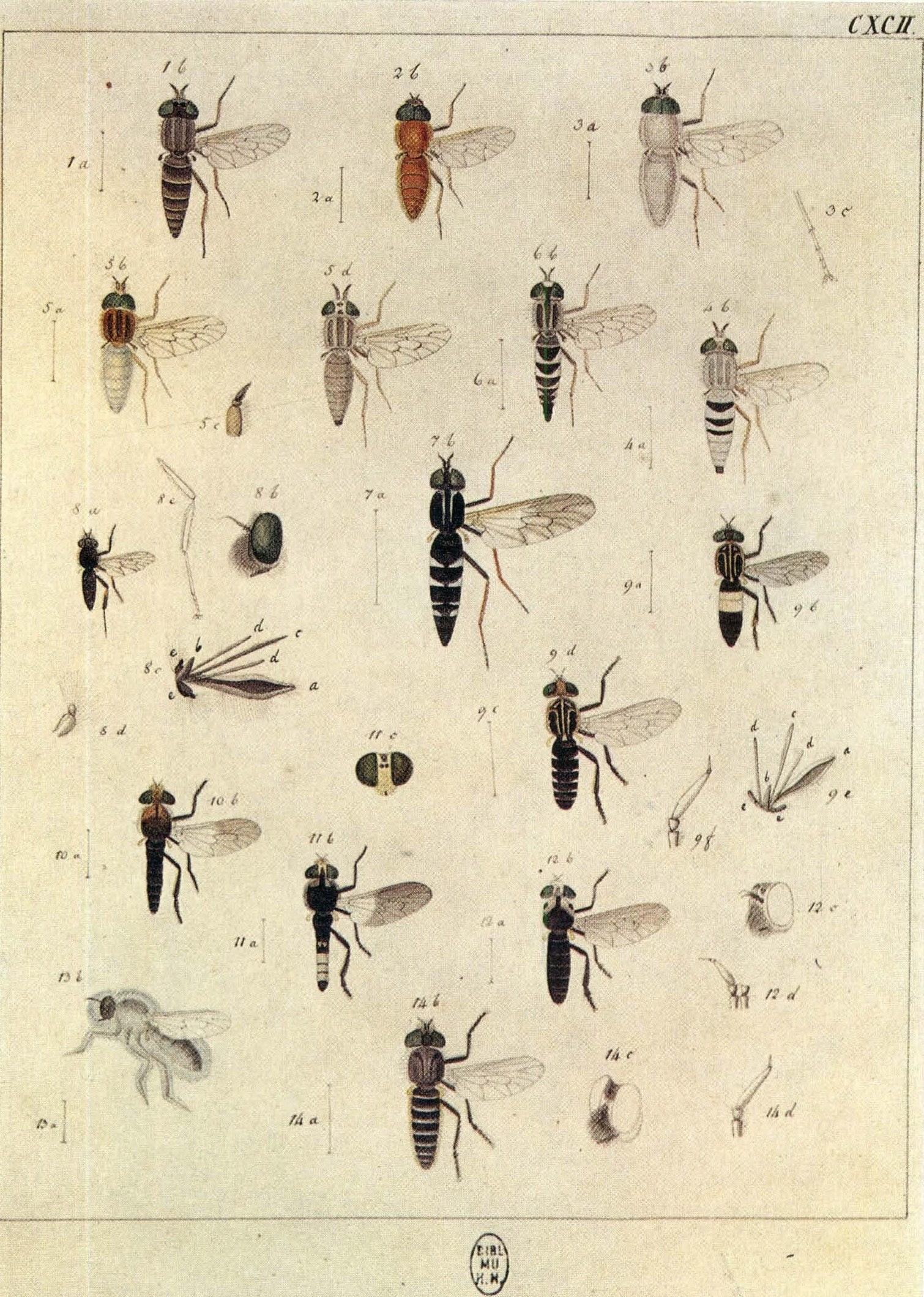
- Thereva unica as bipunctata in Meigen Europäischen Zweiflügeligen fig 1

Scientific classification
- Domain: Eukaryota
- Kingdom: Animalia
- Phylum: Arthropoda
- Class: Insecta
- Order: Diptera
- Family: Therevidae
- Genus: Thereva
- Species: T. unica

Binomial name
- Thereva unica (Harris, 1780)

Synonyms
- Neothereva hermaphrodita Becker, 1922; Thereva vulpina Krober, 1912; Neothereva frontata Krober, 1912; Thereva bipunctata Meigen, 1820; Thereva albipennis Meigen, 1820; Thereva albilabris Meigen, 1820; Bibio lugubris* Fabricius, 1787

= Thereva unica =

Species of fly

Thereva unica is a Palearctic species of stiletto fly in the family Therevidae.
