= Breviperna placida =

Scientific classification
- Domain: Eukaryota
- Kingdom: Animalia
- Phylum: Arthropoda
- Class: Insecta
- Order: Diptera
- Family: Therevidae
- Genus: Breviperna
- Species: B. placida

Binomial name
- Breviperna placida (Coquillett, 1894)

Synonyms
- Psilocephala placida Coquillett, 1894

Species of fly

Breviperna placida is a species of stiletto flies in the family Therevidae.
