= Acrosathe vanduzeei =

Scientific classification
- Domain: Eukaryota
- Kingdom: Animalia
- Phylum: Arthropoda
- Class: Insecta
- Order: Diptera
- Family: Therevidae
- Genus: Acrosathe
- Species: A. vanduzeei

Binomial name
- Acrosathe vanduzeei (Cole, 1923)

Synonyms
- Thereva vanduzeei Cole, 1923

Species of fly

Acrosathe vanduzeei is a species of stiletto fly in the family Therevidae.
