= Henicomyia hubbardii =

Scientific classification
- Domain: Eukaryota
- Kingdom: Animalia
- Phylum: Arthropoda
- Class: Insecta
- Order: Diptera
- Family: Therevidae
- Genus: Henicomyia
- Species: H. hubbardii

Binomial name
- Henicomyia hubbardii Coquillett, 1898

Synonyms
- Henicomyia varipes Krober, 1912

Species of fly

Henicomyia hubbardii is a species of stiletto flies in the family Therevidae.
