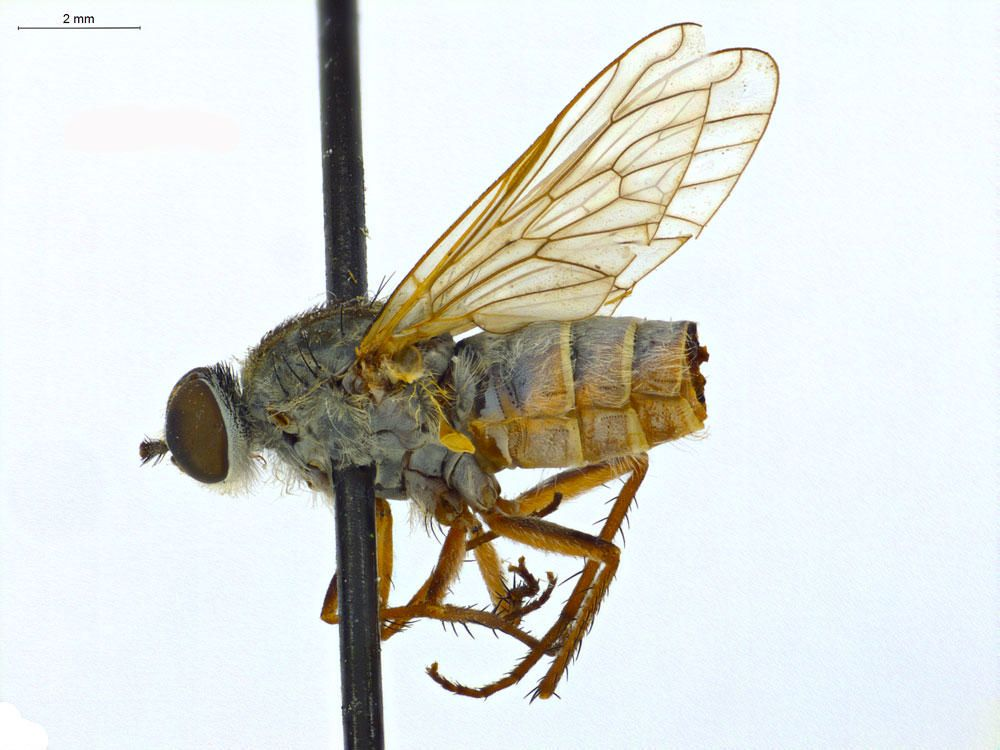
- Male holotype

Conservation status
- Data Deficient (NZ TCS)

Scientific classification
- Kingdom: Animalia
- Phylum: Arthropoda
- Class: Insecta
- Order: Diptera
- Family: Therevidae
- Genus: Anabarhynchus
- Species: A. albipennis

Binomial name
- Anabarhynchus albipennis Lyneborg, 1992

= Anabarhynchus albipennis =

Species of fly

Anabarhynchus albipennis is a species of stiletto fly in the family Therevidae. This species is endemic to New Zealand and has only been found at Lake Pukaki in Canterbury.

== Taxonomy ==
It was described by Leif Lyneborg in 1992 using a specimen collected by W. J. Thompson at Lake Pukaki. The male holotype specimen is held at the Natural History Museum of Denmark.

== Description ==
The body length is approximately 10mm, and the wings measure about 7.5mm in length. These species are known only from the male holotype specimen.

== Distribution ==
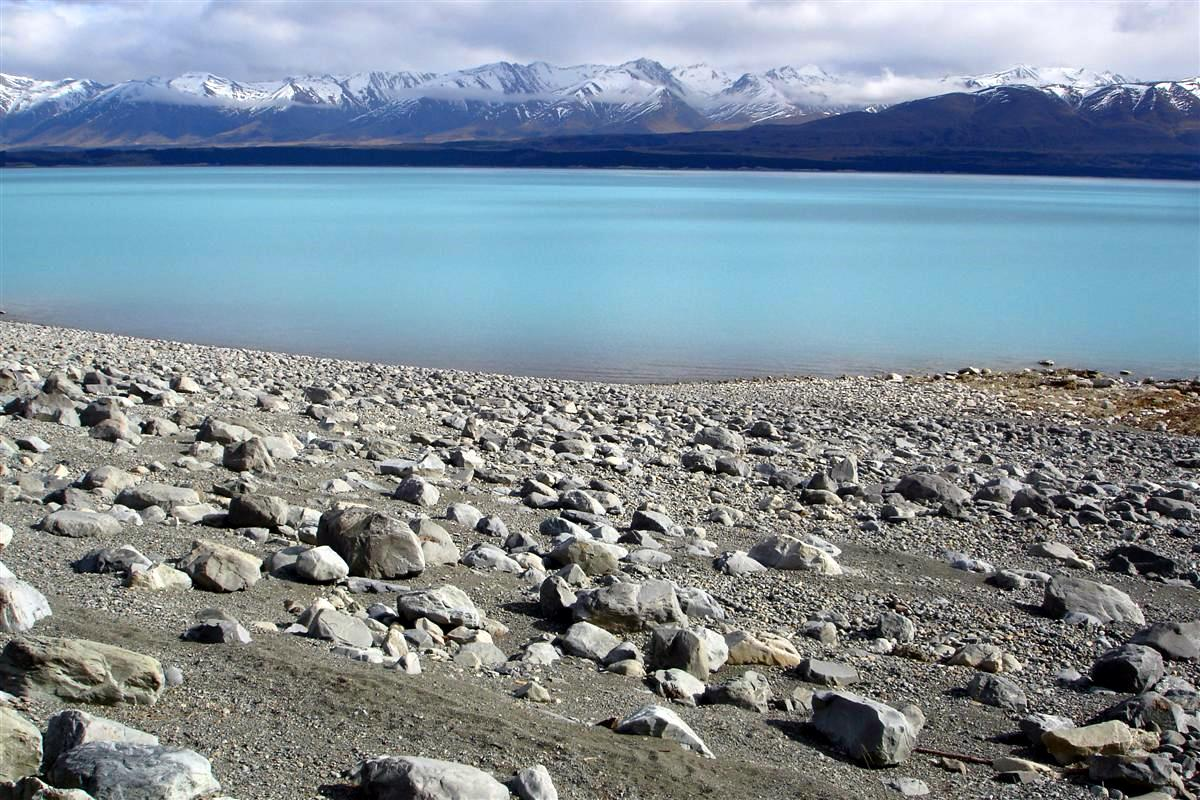
Lake Pukaki, type locality of A. albipennis

These species are endemic to New Zealand and is only known from its type locality of Lake Pukaki.

== Conservation status ==
The Department of Conservation has classified this species as "Data Deficient" under the New Zealand Threat Classification System.
