= Pherocera =

Scientific classification
- Domain: Eukaryota
- Kingdom: Animalia
- Phylum: Arthropoda
- Class: Insecta
- Order: Diptera
- Family: Therevidae
- Genus: Pherocera; Cole, 1923

Genus of flies

Pherocera is a genus of stiletto flies in the family Therevidae. There are about 12 described species in Pherocera.

== Species ==
These 12 species belong to the genus Pherocera:

- Pherocera albihalteralis Cole, 1923^{i c g}
- Pherocera bishopensis Irwin, 1983^{i c g}
- Pherocera boharti Irwin, 1983^{i c g}
- Pherocera boydi Irwin, 1983^{i c g}
- Pherocera flavipes Cole, 1923^{i c g b}
- Pherocera nigragena Irwin, 1983^{i c g}
- Pherocera nigripes Cole, 1923^{i c g}
- Pherocera rufoabdominalis Irwin, 1983^{i c g}
- Pherocera rupina Irwin, 1983^{i c g}
- Pherocera rupini Irwin, 1983^{c g}
- Pherocera signatifrons Cole, 1923^{i c g}
- Pherocera tomentamala Irwin, 1983^{i c g}

Data sources: i = ITIS, c = Catalogue of Life, g = GBIF, b = Bugguide.net
