= Scenopinus fenestralis =

Scientific classification
- Kingdom: Animalia
- Phylum: Arthropoda
- Clade: Pancrustacea
- Class: Insecta
- Order: Diptera
- Family: Scenopinidae
- Genus: Scenopinus
- Species: S. fenestralis

Binomial name
- Scenopinus fenestralis (Linnaeus, 1758)

Species of fly

Scenopinus fenestralis, the window fly, is a member of the Scenopinidae family of flies, found in Europe, including Central Europe and Southern England. It is somewhat inactive, small and black, and tends to be found resting on the windows of old buildings and outhouses. Its larvae are notable for feeding on the larvae of clothes moths and fleas, though they also eat other insects.
