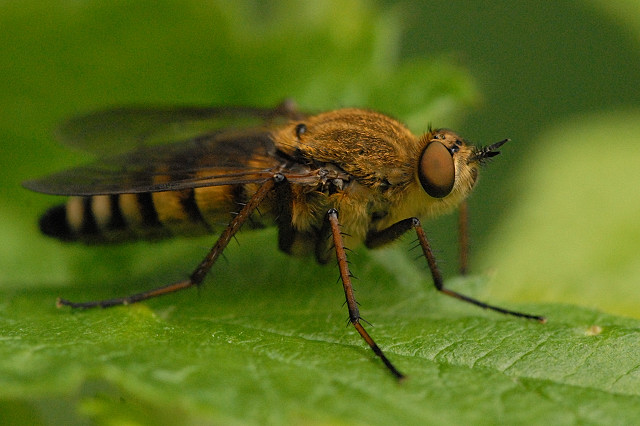
- Thereva nobilitata

Scientific classification
- Kingdom: Animalia
- Phylum: Arthropoda
- Clade: Pancrustacea
- Class: Insecta
- Order: Diptera
- Family: Therevidae
- Subfamily: Therevinae
- Genus: Thereva; Latreille, 1796

Species
- See text

Synonyms
- Athereva Kröber, 1925; Caenozona Kröber, 1912; Exapata Macquart, 1840; Neothereva Kröber, 1912; Reinigiellum Enderlein, 1934

= Thereva =

Genus of flies

Thereva cf. nobilitata (video, 1m 37s)

Thereva is a genus of flies from the family Therevidae commonly known as stiletto flies.

== Species ==
- T. albohirta Kröber, 1912
- T. albopilosa Kröber, 1912
- T. albovittata Strobl, 1909
- T. apicalis Wiedemann, 1821
- T. aurata Loew, 1854
- T. aurofasciata Kröber, 1912
- T. bakeri Cole, 1923
- T. bicinctella Costa, 1883
- T. binotata Loew, 1847
- T. biroi Kröber, 1913
- T. brevicornis Loew, 1847
- T. brunnea Cole, 1923
- T. callosa Kröber, 1912
- T. canescens Kröber, 1912
- T. cincta Meigen, 1829
- T. cingulata Kröber, 1912
- T. cinifera Meigen, 1830
- T. circumscripta Loew, 1847
- T. comata Loew, 1869
- T. concavifrons Kröber, 1914
- T. confusa Kröber, 1913
- T. diversa Coquillett, 1894
- T. duplicis Coquillett, 1893
- T. eggeri Lyneborg & Spitzer, 1974
- T. egressa Coquillett, 1894
- T. flavescens Loew, 1847
- T. flavicauda Coquillett, 1904
- T. flavicincta Loew, 1869
- T. flavipilosa Cole, 1923
- T. flavohirta Kröber, 1914
- T. foxi Cole, 1923
- T. frontalis Say, 1824
- T. frontosa Kröber, 1912
- T. fucata Loew, 1872
- T. fucatoides Bromley, 1937
- T. fulva (Meigen, 1804)
- T. fuscinervis Zetterstedt, 1838
- T. glaucescens Kröber, 1912
- T. gomerae Baez, 1982
- T. graeca Kröber, 1912
- T. grancanariensis Baez, 1982
- T. grisea Kröber, 1913
- T. handlirschi Kröber, 1912
- T. hilarimorpha Kröber, 1912
- T. hirticeps Loew, 1874
- T. hispanica Strobl, 1909
- T. hyalina Kröber, 1913
- T. inornata Verrall, 1909
- T. insularis Becker, 1922
- T. johnsoni Coquillett, 1893
- T. lanata Zetterstedt, 1838
- T. laufferi Strobl, 1909
- T. macdunnoughi Cole, 1925
- T. macedonica Kröber, 1912
- T. maculipennis Kröber, 1912
- T. marginula Meigen, 1820
- T. microcephala Loew, 1847
- T. nebulosa Kröber, 1912
- T. neglecta Kröber, 1912
- T. neomexicana Cole, 1923
- T. nigrifrons Kröber, 1913
- T. nigripilosa Cole, 1923
- T. nitida Macquart, 1934
- T. niveipennis Kröber, 1914
- T. nobilitata (Fabricius, 1775)
- T. obtecta Loew, 1847
- T. occulta Becker, 1908
- T. oculata Egger, 1859
- T. opaca Kröber, 1913
- T. pallipes Loew, 1869
- T. plebeja (Linnaeus, 1758)
- T. praecox Egger, 1859
- T. pseudoculata Cole, 1923
- T. punctipennis Wiedemann, 1821
- T. rossica Becker, 1922
- T. rufiventris Kröber, 1912
- T. rustica Loew, 1840
- T. sobrina Kröber, 1912
- T. spiloptera Wiedemann, 1824
- T. spinulosa Loew, 1847
- T. strigata (Fabricius, 1794)
- T. strigipes Loew, 1869
- T. subnitida Kröber, 1913
- T. teydea Frey, 1937
- T. tomentosa Kröber, 1913
- T. tristis Loew, 1847
- T. tuberculata Loew, 1847
- T. unica (Harris, 1780)
- T. unicolor Kröber, 1913
- T. ustulata Kröber, 1912
- T. utahensis Hardy, 938
- T. valida Loew, 1847
