= Breviperna =

Scientific classification
- Domain: Eukaryota
- Kingdom: Animalia
- Phylum: Arthropoda
- Class: Insecta
- Order: Diptera
- Family: Therevidae
- Subfamily: Therevinae
- Genus: Breviperna; Irwin, 1977

Genus of flies

Breviperna is a genus of stiletto flies in the family Therevidae. There are at least two described species in Breviperna.

== Species ==
These two species belong to the genus Breviperna:

- Breviperna milleri Irwin, 1977^{c g}
- Breviperna placida (Coquillett, 1894)^{i c g b}

Data sources: i = ITIS, c = Catalogue of Life, g = GBIF, b = Bugguide.net
