= Brachylinga =

Scientific classification
- Domain: Eukaryota
- Kingdom: Animalia
- Phylum: Arthropoda
- Class: Insecta
- Order: Diptera
- Family: Therevidae
- Subfamily: Therevinae
- Genus: Brachylinga; Irwin & Lyneborg, 1981

Genus of flies

Brachylinga is a genus of stiletto flies in the family Therevidae. There are at least 20 described species in Brachylinga.

== Species ==
These 28 species belong to the genus Brachylinga:

- Brachylinga albifrons Webb, 2006^{c g}
- Brachylinga albiseta (Malloch, 1932)^{c g}
- Brachylinga antennata (Krober, 1911)^{c}
- Brachylinga attenuata Webb, 2006^{c g}
- Brachylinga baccata (Coquillett, 1893)^{i c g}
- Brachylinga bicolor Webb, 2006^{c g}
- Brachylinga chilensis (Macquart, 1840)^{c g}
- Brachylinga cinerea (Cole, 1923)^{i c g}
- Brachylinga clausa (Kroeber, 1929)^{c g}
- Brachylinga concava Webb, 2006^{c g}
- Brachylinga curacaoensis Webb, 2006^{c g}
- Brachylinga divaricata Webb, 2006^{c g}
- Brachylinga fraterna (Krober, 1911)^{c g}
- Brachylinga laculata Webb, 2006^{c g}
- Brachylinga mexicana Webb, 2006^{c g}
- Brachylinga mimica Webb, 2006^{c g}
- Brachylinga morata (Coquillett, 1893)^{i c g}
- Brachylinga obscura (Coquillett, 1893)^{i}
- Brachylinga ornata (Krober, 1911)^{c g}
- Brachylinga ornatifrons (Krober, 1911)^{c}
- Brachylinga pavida (Coquillett, 1893)^{i c g b}
- Brachylinga pilosa (Krober, 1914)^{i g}
- Brachylinga punctifrons (Kroeber, 1914)^{c g}
- Brachylinga sericeifrons (Krober, 1928)^{c g}
- Brachylinga squamosa (Hardy, 1943)^{i}
- Brachylinga tepocae (Cole, 1923)^{i c g}
- Brachylinga tridentata Webb, 2006^{c g}
- Brachylinga xanthoperna Irwin & Webb, 1992^{c g}

Data sources: i = ITIS, c = Catalogue of Life, g = GBIF, b = Bugguide.net
