= Penniverpa =

Scientific classification
- Kingdom: Animalia
- Phylum: Arthropoda
- Class: Insecta
- Order: Diptera
- Family: Therevidae
- Subfamily: Therevinae
- Genus: Penniverpa; Irwin & Lyneborg, 1981

Genus of flies

Penniverpa is a genus of stiletto flies in the family Therevidae. There are about 14 described species in Penniverpa.

== Species ==
These 14 species belong to the genus Penniverpa:

- Penniverpa alvatra Irwin & Webb, 1992^{c g}
- Penniverpa bradleyi Webb, 2008^{c g}
- Penniverpa chersonesa Webb, 2008^{c g}
- Penniverpa dives Schiner, 1868^{c g}
- Penniverpa epidema Webb, 2008^{c g}
- Penniverpa evani Webb, 2008^{c g}
- Penniverpa festina (Coquillett, 1893)^{i c g b}
- Penniverpa gracilis (Krober, 1911)^{c}
- Penniverpa insular Webb, 2008^{c g}
- Penniverpa megaplax Webb, 2008^{c g}
- Penniverpa multisetosa Webb, 2008^{c g}
- Penniverpa parvula (Krober, 1911)^{c g}
- Penniverpa senilis (Fabricius, 1805)^{i g}
- Penniverpa unispinosa Webb, 2008^{c g}

Data sources: i = ITIS, c = Catalogue of Life, g = GBIF, b = Bugguide.net
