= Metatrichia =

Scientific classification
- Kingdom: Animalia
- Phylum: Arthropoda
- Class: Insecta
- Order: Diptera
- Family: Scenopinidae
- Subfamily: Scenopininae
- Genus: Metatrichia; Coquillett, 1900

Type species
- Scenopinus bulbosa Osten Sacken, 1877

Synonyms
- Pseudomphrale Kröber, 1913

Genus of flies

Metatrichia is a genus of window flies in the family Scenopinidae.

== Species ==
- Metatrichia asiatica Krivosheina & Krivosheina, 1999
- Metatrichia barbata Ale-Rocha & Limeira-de-Oliveira, 2021
- Metatrichia bilituna Kelsey, 1981
- Metatrichia brunnipennis Ale-Rocha & Limeira-de-Oliveira, 2021
- Metatrichia bulbosa (Osten Sacken, 1877)
- Metatrichia clausa (Loew, 1873)
- Metatrichia deserticola Krivosheina & Krivosheina, 1999
- Metatrichia freidbergi Krivosheina & Krivosheina, 1999
- Metatrichia griseola (Coquillett, 1900)
- Metatrichia lophyrosoma (Speiser, 1920)
- Metatrichia mongolica Kelsey, 1981
- Metatrichia nigeriana Kelsey, 1984
- Metatrichia palaestinensis (Kröber, 1937)
- Metatrichia papuana Kelsey, 1970
- †Metatrichia pria Yeates & Grimaldi, 1993
- Metatrichia robusta Kröber, 1913
- Metatrichia stevensoni (Bezzi, 1925)
- Metatrichia thailandica Kelsey, 1970
