= Tabuda (fly) =

Scientific classification
- Kingdom: Animalia
- Phylum: Arthropoda
- Class: Insecta
- Order: Diptera
- Family: Therevidae
- Subfamily: Therevinae
- Genus: Tabuda; Walker, 1852

Genus of flies

Tabuda is a genus of stiletto flies in the family Therevidae, with about seven described species.

== Species ==
These seven species belong to the genus Tabuda:

- Tabuda borealis Cole, 1923^{i c g}
- Tabuda lyneborgi Webb & Irwin, 1999^{c g}
- Tabuda montana (Zaitzev, 1970)^{c g}
- Tabuda planiceps (Loew, 1872)^{i c g b}
- Tabuda superba (Frey, 1921)^{c g}
- Tabuda varia (Walker, 1848)^{i c g b}
- Tabuda zaitzevi Webb & Irwin, 1999^{c g}

Data sources: i = ITIS, c = Catalogue of Life, g = GBIF, b = Bugguide.net
