= Chromolepida =

Scientific classification
- Domain: Eukaryota
- Kingdom: Animalia
- Phylum: Arthropoda
- Class: Insecta
- Order: Diptera
- Family: Therevidae
- Subfamily: Therevinae
- Genus: Chromolepida; Cole, 1923

Genus of flies

Chromolepida is a genus of stiletto flies in the family Therevidae. There are about five described species in Chromolepida.

== Species ==
These five species belong to the genus Chromolepida:

- Chromolepida bella Cole, 1923
- Chromolepida clavitibia Webb & Irwin, 1995
- Chromolepida mexicana Cole, 1923
- Chromolepida nigra Webb & Irwin, 1995
- Chromolepida pruinosa (Coquillett, 1904)
