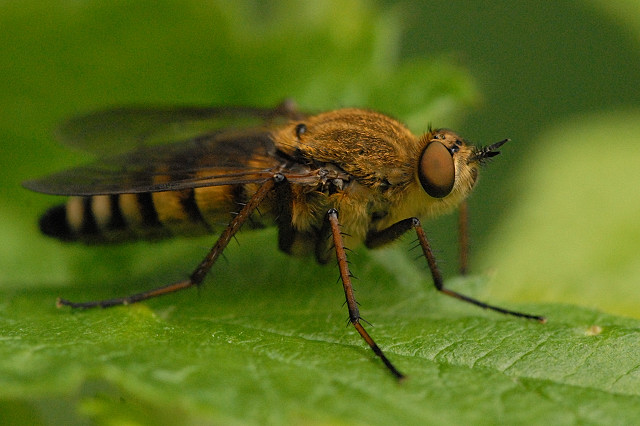

Scientific classification
- Kingdom: Animalia
- Phylum: Arthropoda
- Clade: Pancrustacea
- Class: Insecta
- Order: Diptera
- Family: Therevidae
- Genus: Thereva
- Species: T. nobilitata

Binomial name
- Thereva nobilitata (Fabricius, 1775)

Synonyms
- Bibio nobilitatus Fabricius, 1775; Thereva cincta Walker, 1851; Thereva circumscripta Verrall, 909; Thereva funebris Walker, 1851

= Thereva nobilitata =

Species of fly

Thereva nobilitata is a species of fly from the family Therevidae. It is commonly known as the common stiletto.
