= Litolinga =

Scientific classification
- Domain: Eukaryota
- Kingdom: Animalia
- Phylum: Arthropoda
- Class: Insecta
- Order: Diptera
- Family: Therevidae
- Subfamily: Therevinae
- Genus: Litolinga; Irwin & Lyneborg, 1981

Genus of flies

Litolinga is a genus of stiletto flies in the family Therevidae. There are at least two described species in Litolinga.

== Species ==
These two species belong to the genus Litolinga:

- Litolinga acuta (Adams, 1903)^{i c g}
- Litolinga tergisa (Say, 1823)^{i c g b}

Data sources: i = ITIS, c = Catalogue of Life, g = GBIF, b = Bugguide.net
