= Henicomyia =

Scientific classification
- Domain: Eukaryota
- Kingdom: Animalia
- Phylum: Arthropoda
- Class: Insecta
- Order: Diptera
- Family: Therevidae
- Subfamily: Xestomyzinae
- Genus: Henicomyia; Coquillett, 1898

Genus of flies

Henicomyia is a genus of stiletto flies in the family Therevidae. There are about seven described species in Henicomyia.

== Species ==
These seven species belong to the genus Henicomyia:

- Henicomyia amazonica Irwin & Webb, 1992^{c g}
- Henicomyia bicolor Lyneborg, 1972^{c g}
- Henicomyia diversicolor Lyneborg, 1972^{c g}
- Henicomyia flava Lyneborg, 1972^{c g}
- Henicomyia hubbardii Coquillett, 1898^{i c g b}
- Henicomyia nigra Lyneborg, 1972^{c g}
- Henicomyia tomentosa Lyneborg, 1972^{c g}

Data sources: i = ITIS, c = Catalogue of Life, g = GBIF, b = Bugguide.net
