= Cionophora =

Scientific classification
- Domain: Eukaryota
- Kingdom: Animalia
- Phylum: Arthropoda
- Class: Insecta
- Order: Diptera
- Family: Therevidae
- Genus: Cionophora; Egger, 1854
- Species: C. kollari

Binomial name
- Cionophora kollari Egger, 1854

Genus of flies

Cionophora is a monotypic genus of flies belonging to the family Therevidae. The only species is Cionophora kollari.

The species is found in Central Europe.
