= Lindneria (fly) =

Scientific classification
- Domain: Eukaryota
- Kingdom: Animalia
- Phylum: Arthropoda
- Class: Insecta
- Order: Diptera
- Family: Therevidae
- Genus: Lindneria

Genus of flies

Lindneria is a genus of stiletto flies in the family Therevidae. There are about six described species in Lindneria.

== Species ==
These six species belong to the genus Lindneria:

- Lindneria bellingeri Metz & Irwin, 2000^{c g}
- Lindneria browni Metz & Irwin, 2000^{c g}
- Lindneria dicosta Metz & Irwin, 2000^{c g}
- Lindneria penelopae Metz & Irwin, 2000^{c g}
- Lindneria thompsoni Metz & Irwin, 2000^{c g}
- Lindneria wintertoni Metz & Irwin, 2000^{c g}

Data sources: i = ITIS, c = Catalogue of Life, g = GBIF, b = Bugguide.net
