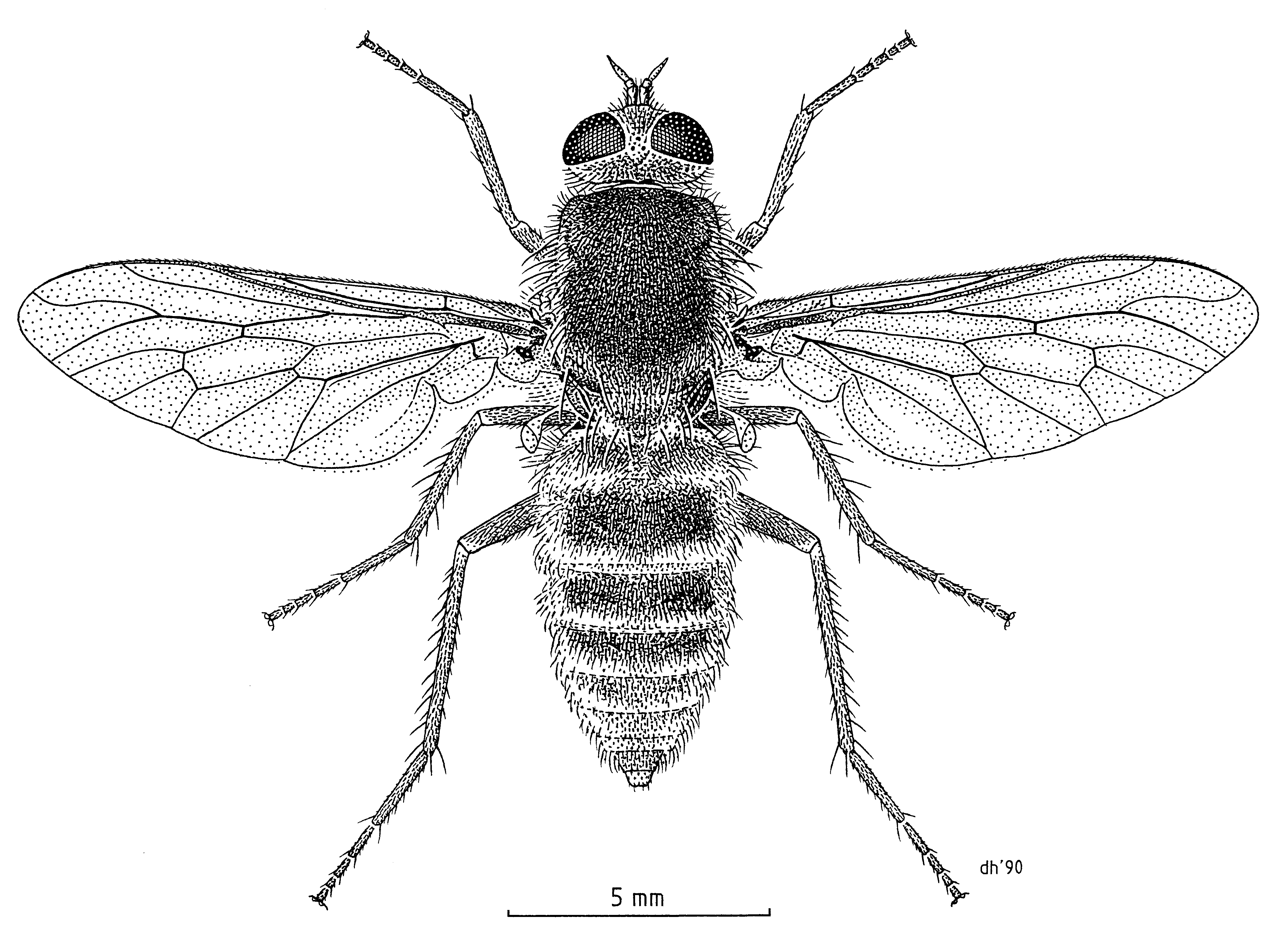
- Anabarhynchus innotatus illustration

Scientific classification
- Kingdom: Animalia
- Phylum: Arthropoda
- Class: Insecta
- Order: Diptera
- Family: Therevidae
- Genus: Anabarhynchus; Macquart, 1848

Species
- 178, see text

= Anabarhynchus =

Genus of fly

Anabarhynchus is a genus of Therevidae native to Australia and New Zealand. There are 178 described species as of 2025:

== Species ==
- Anabarhynchus abdominalis Kröber, 1912
- Anabarhynchus acuminatus Lyneborg, 1992
- Anabarhynchus adornatus Lyneborg, 2001
- Anabarhynchus albellus Lyneborg, 2001
- Anabarhynchus albipennis Lyneborg, 1992
- Anabarhynchus albosetosus Lyneborg, 2001
- Anabarhynchus alpinus Lyneborg, 2001
- Anabarhynchus annulatus Lyneborg, 2001
- Anabarhynchus apertus (Macquart, 1846)
- Anabarhynchus arenarius Lyneborg, 1992
- Anabarhynchus argenteus Mann, 1928
- Anabarhynchus atratus Lyneborg, 1992
- Anabarhynchus atrifemoratus Lyneborg, 2001
- Anabarhynchus atripes Lyneborg, 1992
- Anabarhynchus aureosericeus Kröber, 1932
- Anabarhynchus barrington Lyneborg, 2001
- Anabarhynchus bicuspidatus Lyneborg, 2001
- Anabarhynchus bigoti Lyneborg, 2001
- Anabarhynchus boharti Lyneborg, 2001
- Anabarhynchus bohemani Thomson, 1869
- Anabarhynchus boomerang Lyneborg, 2001
- Anabarhynchus brevicornis Lyneborg, 1992
- Anabarhynchus brunninervis Kröber, 1932
- Anabarhynchus busseltonensis Lyneborg, 2001
- Anabarhynchus calceatus Schiner, 1868
- Anabarhynchus camiro Lyneborg, 2001
- Anabarhynchus carduus Lyneborg, 2001
- Anabarhynchus cinereus Kröber, 1912
- Anabarhynchus collessi Lyneborg, 2001
- Anabarhynchus completus Lyneborg, 1992
- Anabarhynchus cretatus Ferguson, 2014
- Anabarhynchus curvistylus Lyneborg, 1992
- Anabarhynchus danielsi Lyneborg, 2001
- Anabarhynchus darembal Ferguson, 2014
- Anabarhynchus decipiens Lyneborg, 2001
- Anabarhynchus dentiphallus Lyneborg, 2001
- Anabarhynchus dimidiatus (Macquart, 1847)
- Anabarhynchus disciphallus Lyneborg, 2001
- Anabarhynchus diversicolor Lyneborg, 1992
- Anabarhynchus doncollessi Ferguson, 2013
- Anabarhynchus dugdalei Lyneborg, 1992
- Anabarhynchus dysmachiiformis Kröber, 1932
- Anabarhynchus embersoni Lyneborg, 1992
- Anabarhynchus ewamin Ferguson, 2013
- Anabarhynchus exiguus Hutton, 1901
- Anabarhynchus farinosus Lyneborg, 1992
- Anabarhynchus fasciatus Macquart, 1848
- Anabarhynchus femoralis Kröber, 1932
- Anabarhynchus fenwicki Lyneborg, 1992
- Anabarhynchus ferruginus Lyneborg, 2001
- Anabarhynchus flaviventris Lyneborg, 1992
- Anabarhynchus flavus Mann, 1928
- Anabarhynchus fluviatilis Lyneborg, 1992
- Anabarhynchus fulvipes Macquart, 1850
- Anabarhynchus furcatus Lyneborg, 2001
- Anabarhynchus fuscoapicatus Lyneborg, 2001
- Anabarhynchus fuscofemoratus Lyneborg, 1992
- Anabarhynchus gascoyne Lyneborg, 2001
- Anabarhynchus gibbsi Lyneborg, 1992
- Anabarhynchus glorious Lyneborg, 2001
- Anabarhynchus granitensis Lyneborg, 2001
- Anabarhynchus grossus Lyneborg, 1992
- Anabarhynchus harrisi Lyneborg, 1992
- Anabarhynchus hayakawai Lyneborg, 1992
- Anabarhynchus helvenacus White, 1915
- Anabarhynchus herpenthus Lyneborg, 2001
- Anabarhynchus hudsoni Lyneborg, 1992
- Anabarhynchus huttoni Lyneborg, 1992
- Anabarhynchus hyalipennis Macquart, 1846
- Anabarhynchus iancommoni Ferguson, 2014
- Anabarhynchus indistinctus Lyneborg, 1992
- Anabarhynchus innotatus (Walker, 1856)
- Anabarhynchus irwini Lyneborg, 2001
- Anabarhynchus kampmeierae Irwin & Lyneborg, 1989
- Anabarhynchus kangaroo Lyneborg, 2001
- Anabarhynchus kosciuskoenis Mann, 1933
- Anabarhynchus kroeberi Lyneborg, 2001
- Anabarhynchus lacustris Lyneborg, 1992
- Anabarhynchus lanatus Lyneborg, 2001
- Anabarhynchus laterepilosus Lyneborg, 1992
- Anabarhynchus latifrons Macquart, 1850
- Anabarhynchus latus Lyneborg, 1992
- Anabarhynchus limbatinervis Kröber, 1932
- Anabarhynchus loneae Lyneborg, 2001
- Anabarhynchus longipennis Kröber, 1932
- Anabarhynchus longipilosus Lyneborg, 1992
- Anabarhynchus longiseta Ferguson, 2014
- Anabarhynchus luctuosus Lyneborg, 2001
- Anabarhynchus lyncurium Ferguson, 2014
- Anabarhynchus lyneborgi Ferguson & Irwin, 2013
- Anabarhynchus macfarlanei Lyneborg, 1992
- Anabarhynchus major Lyneborg, 1992
- Anabarhynchus maori Hutton, 1901
- Anabarhynchus mcalpinei Lyneborg, 2001
- Anabarhynchus megalopyge Lyneborg, 1992
- Anabarhynchus megaphallus Lyneborg, 2001
- Anabarhynchus microphallus Lyneborg, 1992
- Anabarhynchus milo Lyneborg, 2001
- Anabarhynchus misellus (Walker, 1835)
- Anabarhynchus moffat Lyneborg, 2001
- Anabarhynchus monstruosus Lyneborg, 2001
- Anabarhynchus montanus White, 1915
- Anabarhynchus monteithi Lyneborg, 2001
- Anabarhynchus monticola Lyneborg, 1992
- Anabarhynchus moretonensis Ferguson, 2014
- Anabarhynchus multispinosus Lyneborg, 2001
- Anabarhynchus neboensis Ferguson, 2014
- Anabarhynchus nebulosus Hutton, 1901
- Anabarhynchus neglectus Kröber, 1932
- Anabarhynchus nigrofemoratus Krober, 1932
- Anabarhynchus niveus Lyneborg, 2001
- Anabarhynchus noosa Lyneborg, 2001
- Anabarhynchus nudifemoratus (Macquart, 1846)
- Anabarhynchus oblongicornus Winterton, 2004
- Anabarhynchus occidentalis Lyneborg, 2001
- Anabarhynchus oceanus Ferguson & Yeates, 2014
- Anabarhynchus ocypteraeformis Lyneborg, 2001
- Anabarhynchus olivaceus Lyneborg, 1992
- Anabarhynchus ornatifrons Kröber, 1914
- Anabarhynchus ostenatus Lyneborg, 1992
- Anabarhynchus pallidus (White, 1915)
- Anabarhynchus paramonovi Lyneborg, 2001
- Anabarhynchus parilus Ferguson, 2013
- Anabarhynchus parkeri Ferguson & Irwin, 2013
- Anabarhynchus passus White, 1915
- Anabarhynchus pilbara Ferguson & Irwin, 2013
- Anabarhynchus planifrons Lyneborg, 2001
- Anabarhynchus plumbeoides Lyneborg, 2001
- Anabarhynchus plumbeus Lyneborg, 2001
- Anabarhynchus poona Lyneborg, 2001
- Anabarhynchus postocularis Lyneborg, 1992
- Anabarhynchus projectus Lyneborg, 2001
- Anabarhynchus queenslandensis Lyneborg, 2001
- Anabarhynchus quinquevittatum (Macquart, 1847)
- Anabarhynchus ravenshoensis Ferguson, 2013
- Anabarhynchus robustus Lyneborg, 1992
- Anabarhynchus rossi Lyneborg, 2001
- Anabarhynchus ruficoxa Lyneborg, 1992
- Anabarhynchus rufobasalis Lyneborg, 1992
- Anabarhynchus rufolateralis Lyneborg, 2001
- Anabarhynchus schlingeri Lyneborg, 1992
- Anabarhynchus semioccultus Lyneborg, 2001
- Anabarhynchus setulosus Lyneborg, 2001
- Anabarhynchus shiptonsflatensis Ferguson, 2013
- Anabarhynchus similis Lyneborg, 1992
- Anabarhynchus simplex Lyneborg, 1992
- Anabarhynchus spiniger Lyneborg, 1992
- Anabarhynchus spinosus Lyneborg, 2001
- Anabarhynchus spitzeri Lyneborg, 1992
- Anabarhynchus striatifrons Lyneborg, 2001
- Anabarhynchus striatus Lyneborg, 2001
- Anabarhynchus stylatus Lyneborg, 2001
- Anabarhynchus tasmanicus Lyneborg, 2001
- Anabarhynchus tauricus Lyneborg, 2001
- Anabarhynchus teddington Lyneborg, 2001
- Anabarhynchus tener Lyneborg, 2001
- Anabarhynchus thoracicus Kröber, 1932
- Anabarhynchus triangularis Lyneborg, 1992
- Anabarhynchus tribulationensis Ferguson, 2013
- Anabarhynchus tricoloratus Lyneborg, 1992
- Anabarhynchus tristis Bigot, 1890
- Anabarhynchus turnham Lyneborg, 2001
- Anabarhynchus umbratilis White, 1915
- Anabarhynchus varians (Walker, 1852)
- Anabarhynchus varipes (Macquart, 1847)
- Anabarhynchus waitarerensis Lyneborg, 1992
- Anabarhynchus wau Lyneborg, 2001
- Anabarhynchus webbi Lyneborg, 2001
- Anabarhynchus weipaensis Ferguson, 2013
- Anabarhynchus westlandensis Lyneborg, 1992
- Anabarhynchus whitei Lyneborg, 2001
- Anabarhynchus wintertoni Ferguson, 2014
- Anabarhynchus wisei Lyneborg, 1992
- Anabarhynchus yarraman Lyneborg, 2001
- Anabarhynchus yeatesi Lyneborg, 2001
- Anabarhynchus yeppoon Lyneborg, 2001
- Anabarhynchus yuraygirensis Lyneborg, 2001
