= Cyclotelus =

Scientific classification
- Kingdom: Animalia
- Phylum: Arthropoda
- Class: Insecta
- Order: Diptera
- Family: Therevidae
- Subfamily: Therevinae
- Genus: Cyclotelus; Walker, 1850

Genus of flies

Cyclotelus is a genus of stiletto flies in the family Therevidae. There are more than 20 described species in Cyclotelus.

== Species ==
These 29 species belong to the genus Cyclotelus:

- Cyclotelus achaetus (Malloch, 1932)
- Cyclotelus badicrusus Irwin & Webb, 1992
- Cyclotelus beckeri (Krober, 1911)
- Cyclotelus bellus (Cole, 1923)
- Cyclotelus brazilianus (Cole, 1960)
- Cyclotelus colei Irwin & Lyneborg, 1981
- Cyclotelus crassicornis Bellardi
- Cyclotelus diversipes (Krober, 1911)
- Cyclotelus extinctus (Walker, 1854)
- Cyclotelus fascipennis (Macquart, 1846)
- Cyclotelus femorata Krober, 1911
- Cyclotelus flavipes (Krober, 1928)
- Cyclotelus fulvipennis (Krober, 1928)
- Cyclotelus hardyi (Cole, 1960)
- Cyclotelus kroeberi (Cole, 1960)
- Cyclotelus laetus Walker, 1850
- Cyclotelus longicornis Krober, 1911
- Cyclotelus nigrifrons (Krober, 1914)
- Cyclotelus nigroflamma Walker, 1850
- Cyclotelus pictipennis (Wiedemann, 1821)
- Cyclotelus polita (Krober, 1911)
- Cyclotelus pruinosus Walker, 1850
- Cyclotelus ruficornis (Macquart, 1840)
- Cyclotelus rufiventris (Loew, 1869)
- Cyclotelus scutellaris (Walker, 1857)
- Cyclotelus silacrusus Irwin & Webb, 1992
- Cyclotelus socius Walker, 1850
- Cyclotelus sumichrasti (Bellardi, 1861)
- Cyclotelus vetusta Walker
