= Nebritus =

Scientific classification
- Domain: Eukaryota
- Kingdom: Animalia
- Phylum: Arthropoda
- Class: Insecta
- Order: Diptera
- Family: Therevidae
- Subfamily: Therevinae
- Genus: Nebritus; Coquillett, 1894

Genus of flies

Nebritus is a genus of stiletto flies in the family Therevidae. There are at least three described species in Nebritus.

== Species ==
These three species belong to the genus Nebritus:

- Nebritus pellucidus Coquillett, 1894^{i c g b}
- Nebritus powelli Webb & Irwin, 1991^{c g b}
- Nebritus tanneri (Hardy, 1938)^{i c g b}

Data sources: i = ITIS, c = Catalogue of Life, g = GBIF, b = Bugguide.net
