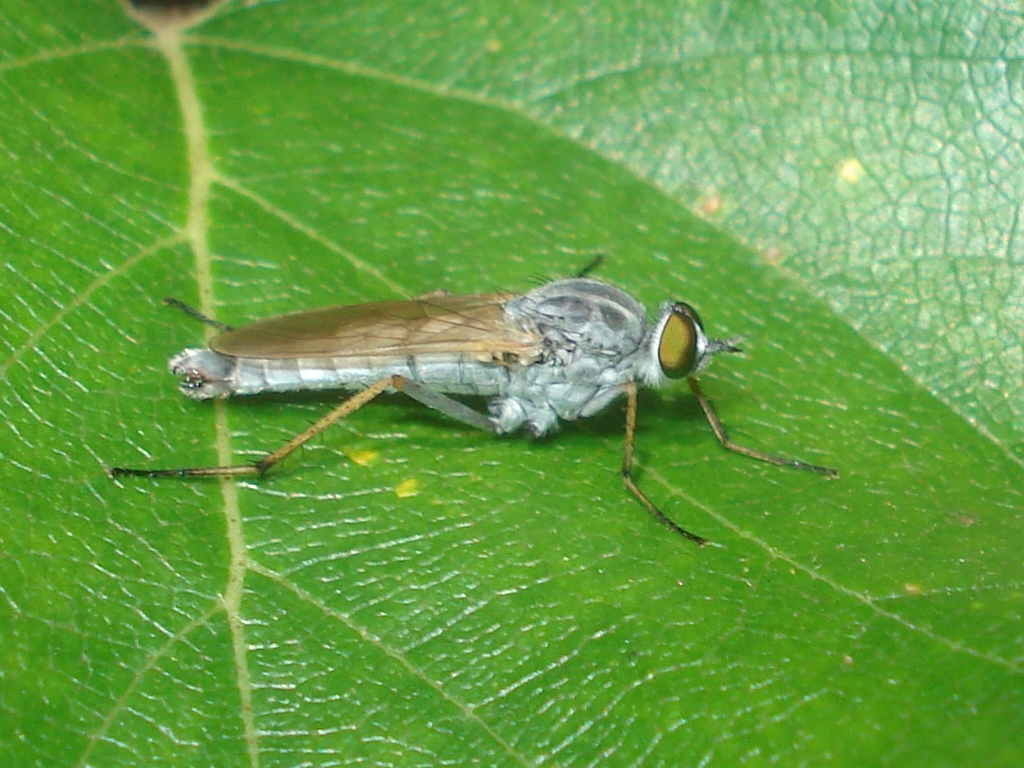

Scientific classification
- Domain: Eukaryota
- Kingdom: Animalia
- Phylum: Arthropoda
- Class: Insecta
- Order: Diptera
- Family: Therevidae
- Subfamily: Therevinae
- Genus: Acrosathe; Irwin & Lyneborg, 1981

= Acrosathe =

Genus of flies

Acrosathe is a genus of stiletto flies in the family Therevidae. There are more than 20 described species in Acrosathe.

== Species ==
These 22 species belong to the genus Acrosathe:

- Acrosathe annulata (Fabricius, 1805)
- Acrosathe baltica Andersson, 1994
- Acrosathe bimaculata (Cole, 1923)
- Acrosathe centralis Yang, 2002
- Acrosathe curvata Lyneborg, 1986
- Acrosathe erberi Lyneborg, 1986
- Acrosathe longipilosa Yang, 2002
- Acrosathe novella (Coquillett, 1893)
- Acrosathe obsoleta Lyneborg, 1986
- Acrosathe otiosa (Coquillett, 1893)
- Acrosathe pacifica (Cole, 1923)
- Acrosathe pallipilosa Yang, Zhang & An, 2003
- Acrosathe parallela Lyneborg, 1986
- Acrosathe polychaeta Yang, 2002
- Acrosathe singularis Yang, 2002
- Acrosathe stylata Lyneborg, 1986
- Acrosathe sybarita (Loew, 1873)
- Acrosathe tashimai Nagatomi & Lyneborg, 1988
- Acrosathe taurica Lyneborg, 1986
- Acrosathe vanduzeei (Cole, 1923)
- Acrosathe vialis (Osten Sacken, 1877)
- Acrosathe yoshikoae Nagatomi & Lyneborg, 1988
