= Salentia =

Scientific classification
- Domain: Eukaryota
- Kingdom: Animalia
- Phylum: Arthropoda
- Class: Insecta
- Order: Diptera
- Family: Therevidae
- Genus: Salentia; Costa, 1857

Genus of flies

Salentia is a genus of flies belonging to the family Therevidae.

The species of this genus are found in Spain and Portugal.

Species:

- Salentia anancitis (Seguy, 1941)
- Salentia asiatica Zaitzev, 1977
- Salentia costalis (Wiedemann, 1824)
- Salentia deserticola Zaitzev, 1977
- Salentia fuscipennis Costa, 1857
- Salentia margiana Zaitzev, 1977
- Salentia mongolica Zaitzev, 1975
- Salentia nigripes (Krober, 1912)
- Salentia stackelbergi Zaitzev, 1977
- Salentia tristis (von Roder, 1885)
- Salentia xestomyzina (Strobl, 1909)
