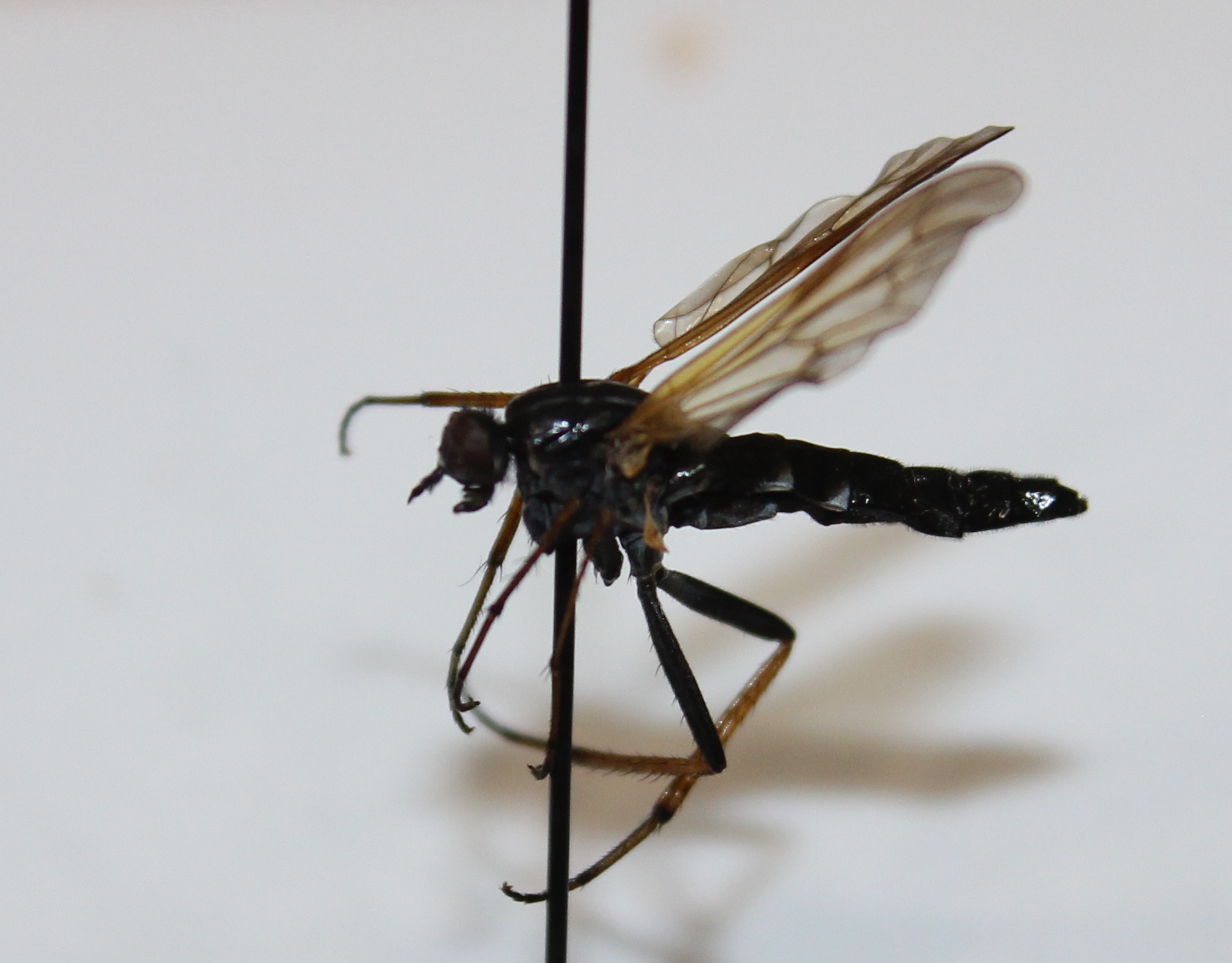
- Pandivirilia eximia

Scientific classification
- Domain: Eukaryota
- Kingdom: Animalia
- Phylum: Arthropoda
- Class: Insecta
- Order: Diptera
- Family: Therevidae
- Subfamily: Therevinae
- Genus: Pandivirilia; Irwin & Lyneborg, 1981

= Pandivirilia =

Genus of insects

Pandivirilia is a genus of flies belonging to the family Therevidae.

The species of this genus are found in Europe, Japan and Northern America.

Species:

- Pandivirilia albifrons (Say, 1829)
- Pandivirilia amurensis Lyneborg, 1986
- Pandivirilia melaleuca (Loew, 1847)
