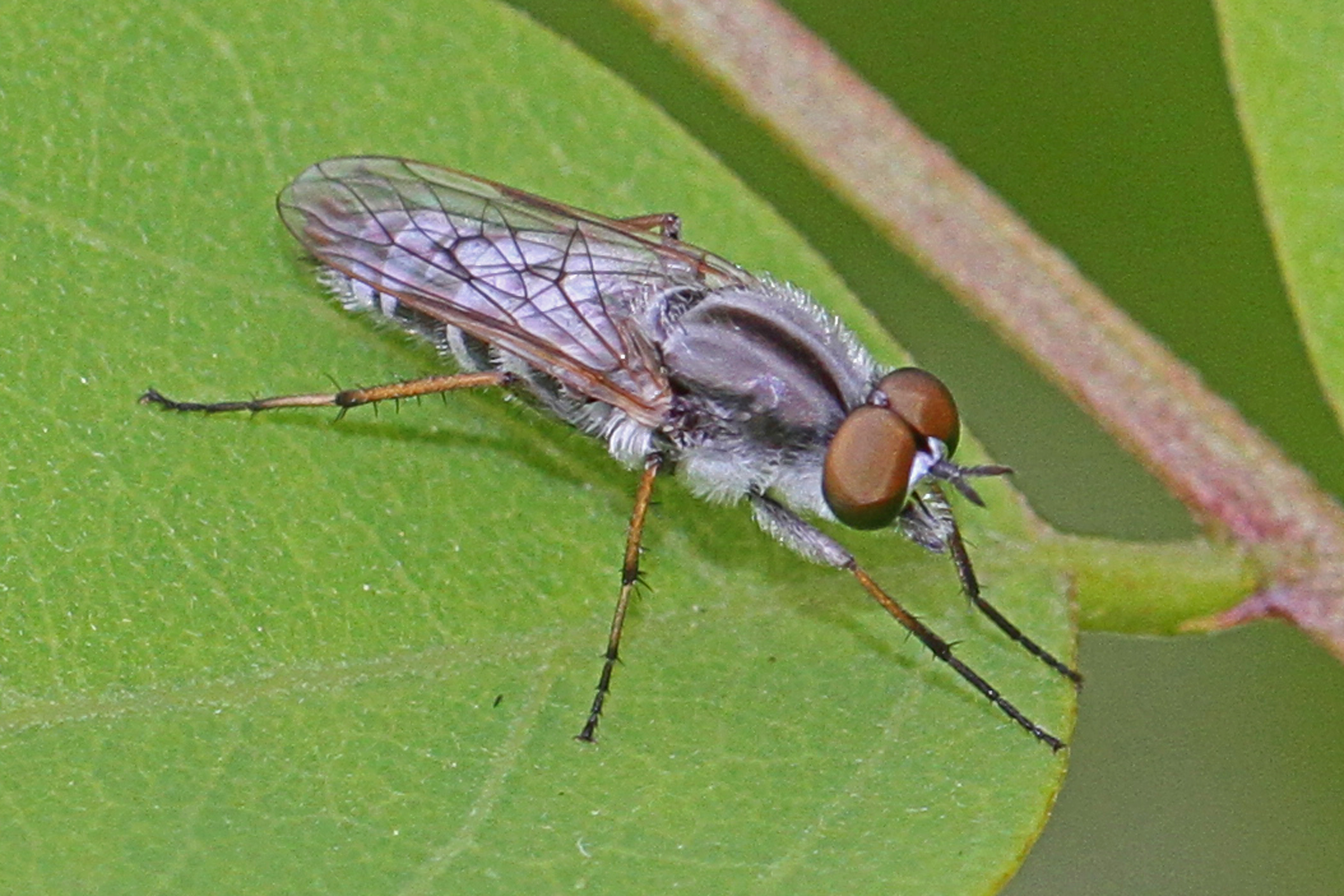
- Ozodiceromyia notata

Scientific classification
- Domain: Eukaryota
- Kingdom: Animalia
- Phylum: Arthropoda
- Class: Insecta
- Order: Diptera
- Family: Therevidae
- Subfamily: Therevinae

= Therevinae =

Subfamily of flies

Therevinae is a subfamily of stiletto flies in the family Therevidae. More than 20 genera and 470 described species are placed in the Therevinae.

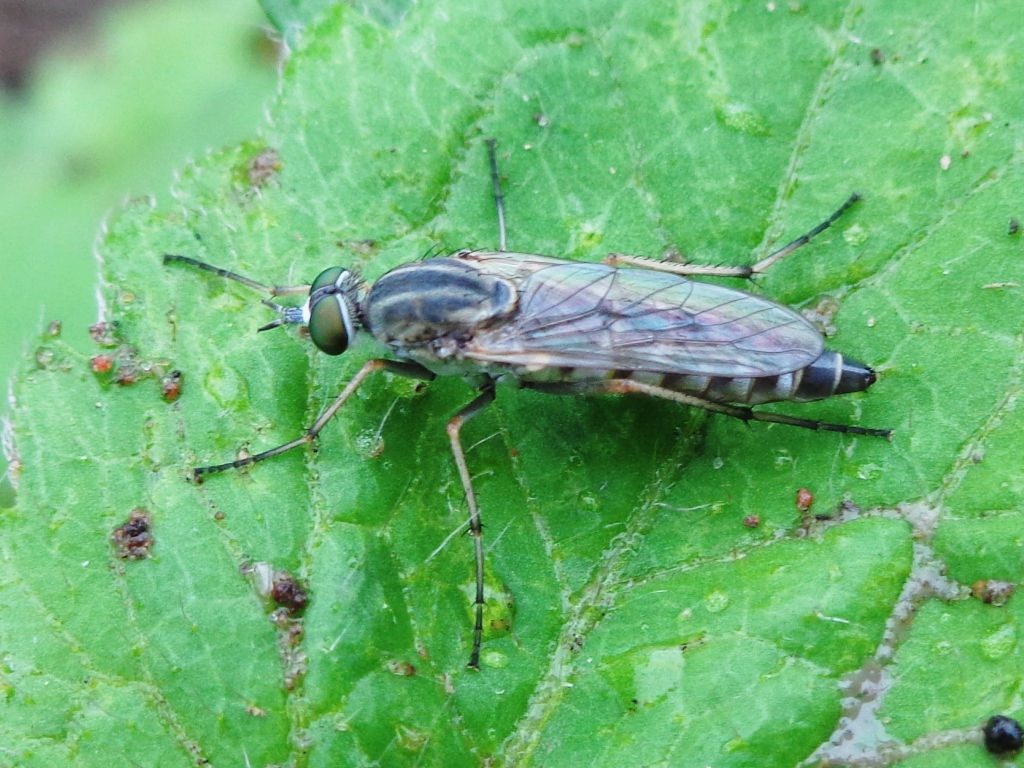
Thereva plebeja

== Genera ==
These 26 genera belong to the subfamily Therevinae:

- Acrosathe Irwin & Lyneborg, 1981
- Ammonaios Irwin & Lyneborg, 1981
- Arenigena Irwin & Lyneborg, 1981
- Brachylinga Irwin & Lyneborg, 1981
- Breviperna Irwin, 1977
- Chromolepida Cole, 1923
- Cyclotelus Walker, 1850
- Dialineura Rondani, 1856
- Dichoglena Irwin & Lyneborg, 1981
- Litolinga Irwin & Lyneborg, 1981
- Lysilinga Irwin & Lyneborg, 1981
- Megalinga Irwin & Lyneborg, 1981
- Melanothereva Malloch, 1932
- Nebritus Coquillett, 1894
- Ozodiceromya Bigot, 1890
- Ozodiceromyia
- Pallicephala Irwin & Lyneborg, 1981
- Pandivirilia Irwin & Lyneborg, 1981
- Penniverpa Irwin & Lyneborg, 1981
- Psilocephala Zetterstedt, 1838
- Rhagioforma Irwin & Lyneborg, 1981
- Spiriverpa Irwin & Lyneborg, 1981
- Tabuda Walker, 1852
- Tabudamima Irwin & Lyneborg, 1981
- Thereva Latreille, 1797
- Viriliricta Irwin & Lyneborg, 1981
