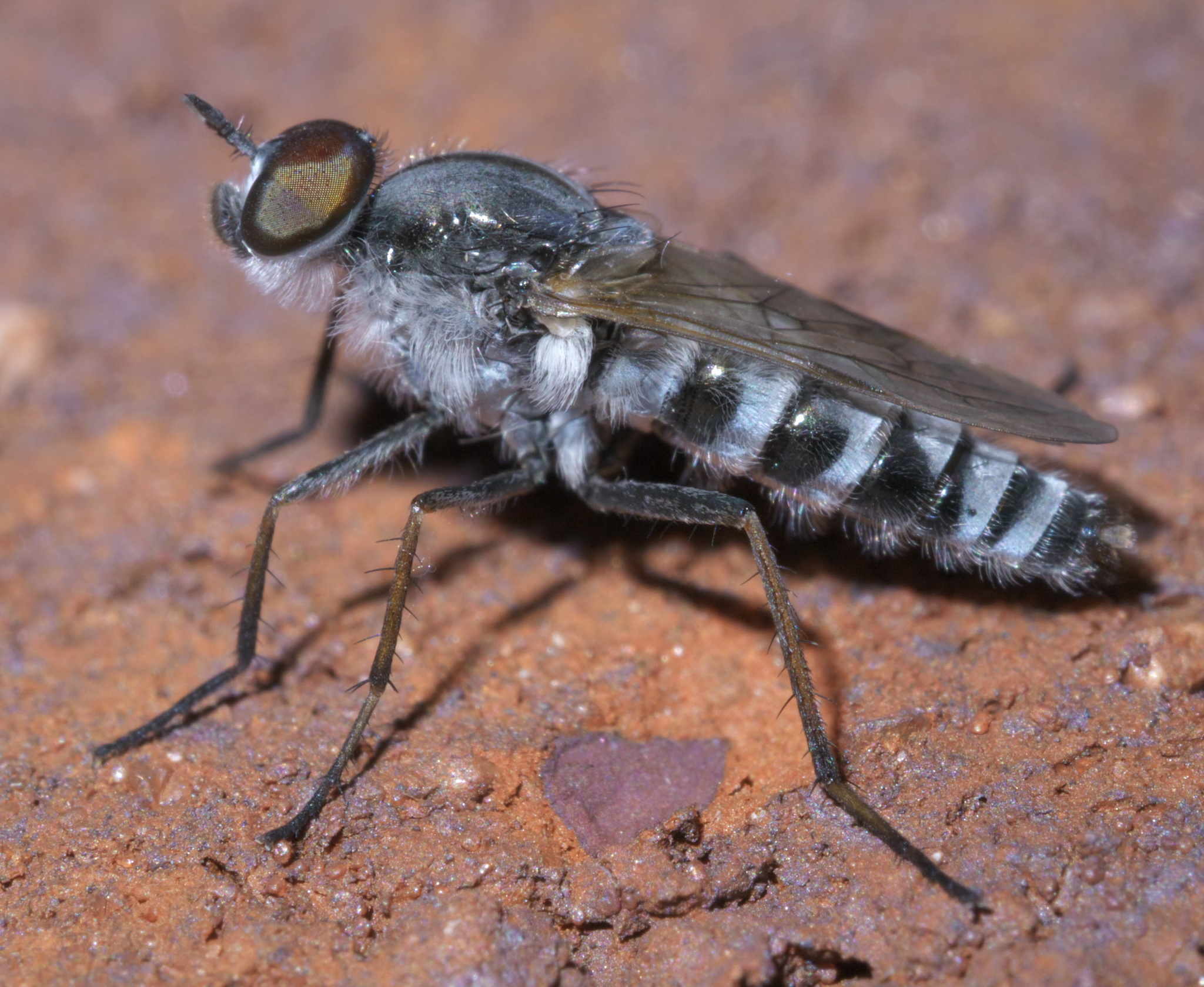
- In Oklahoma, USA

Scientific classification
- Kingdom: Animalia
- Phylum: Arthropoda
- Class: Insecta
- Order: Diptera
- Family: Therevidae
- Tribe: Cyclotelini
- Genus: Ozodiceromyia; Bigot, 1890

= Ozodiceromyia =

Genus of flies

Ozodiceromyia is a genus of stiletto flies in the family Therevidae. There are about seven described species in the genus Ozodiceromyia, found in North America, Central America, and northern South America.

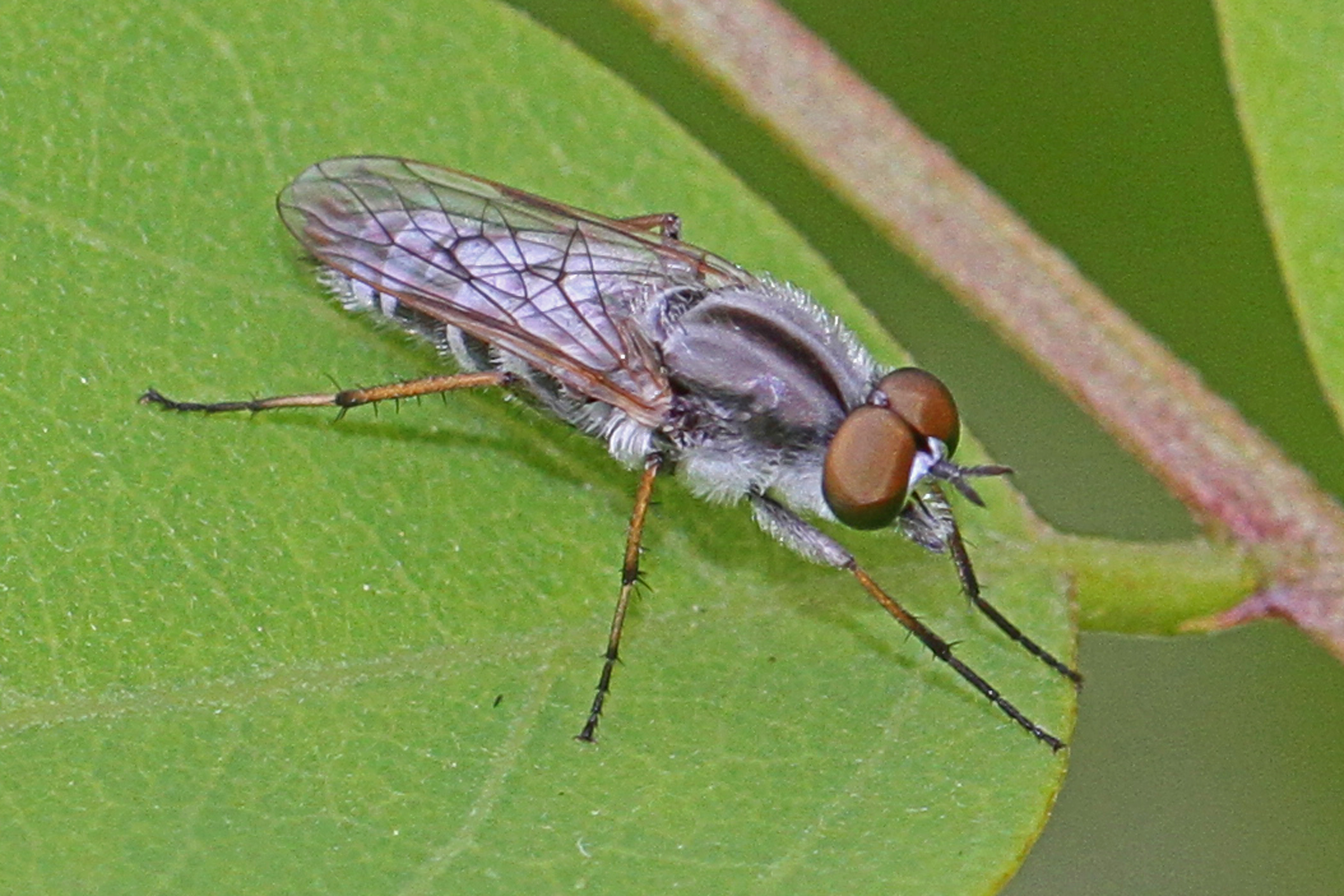
Ozodiceromyia notata, Virginia

== Species ==
These seven species belong to the genus Ozodiceromyia:

- Ozodiceromyia argentata
- Ozodiceromyia flavipennis
- Ozodiceromyia levigata
- Ozodiceromyia nanella
- Ozodiceromyia nigrimana
- Ozodiceromyia notata
- Ozodiceromyia signatipennis
