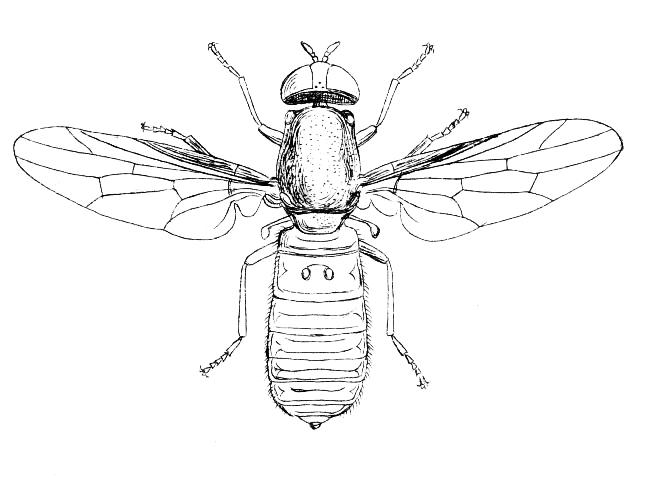

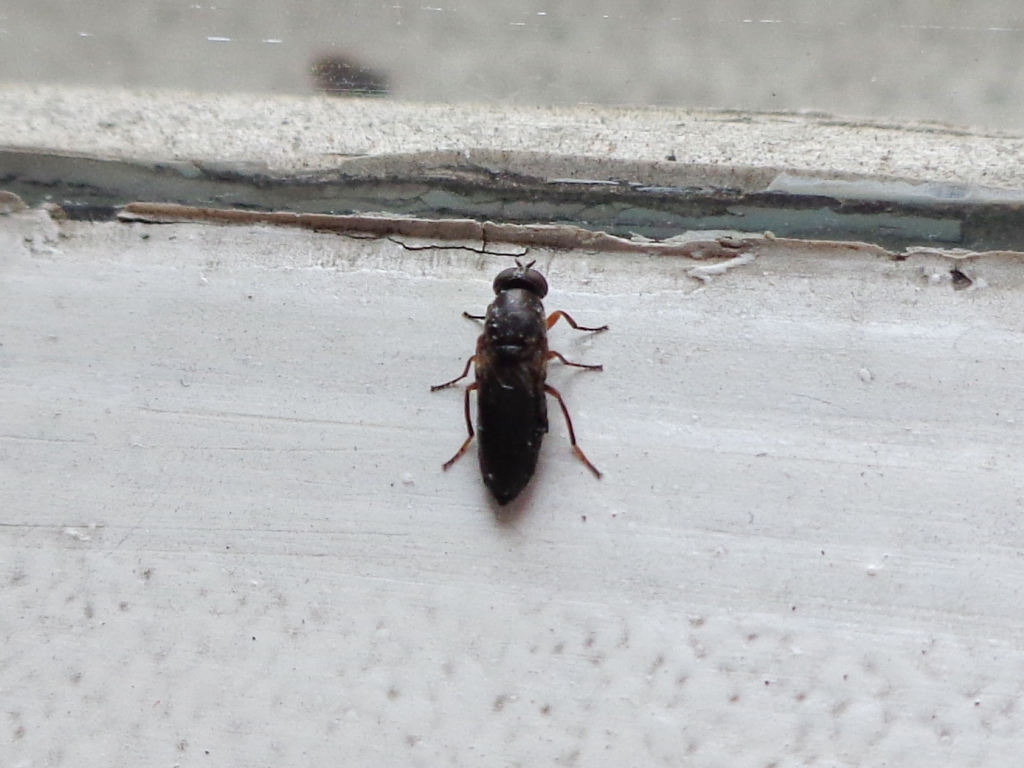
- Scenopinus fenestralis

Scientific classification
- Kingdom: Animalia
- Phylum: Arthropoda
- Class: Insecta
- Order: Diptera
- Superfamily: Asiloidea
- Family: Scenopinidae; Fallén, 1817

Synonyms
- Omphralidae

= Scenopinidae =

Scenopinidae Temporal range: Cenomanian–Recent

Family of flies

The Scenopinidae or window flies are a small (about 400 described species) family of flies (Diptera), distributed worldwide. In buildings, they are often taken at windows, hence the common name window flies.

The two species with cosmopolitan distributions are associated with the movement of trade goods (Scenopinus fenestralis and S. glabrifrons). Very little is known of the larval biology; larvae have been found associated with stored-grain pests, in nests of birds and rodents, in beetle larvae burrows in trees and shrubs, and in association with therevid larvae in soil. They may be predators of the larvae of other insects. Adults have sponging mouthparts and are found on open flowers.

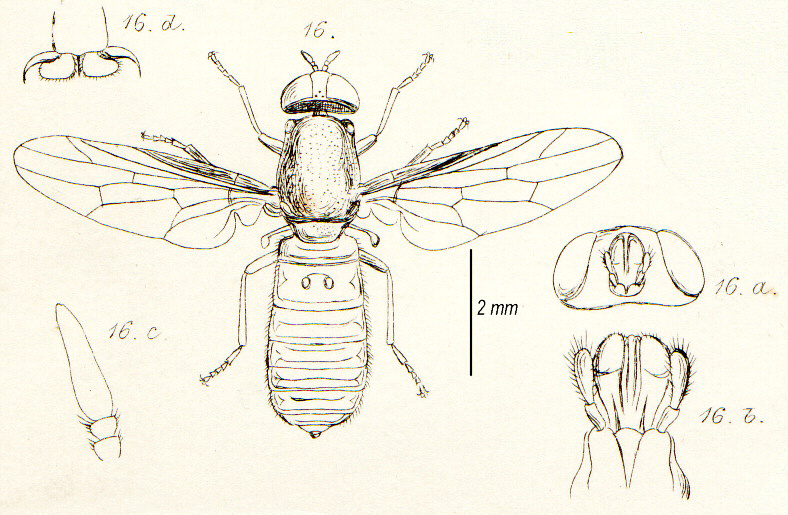
Scenopinus fenestralis whole insect and dissected parts

== Description ==
The adults are small insects, usually with the body no longer than 5 mm, glabrous or slightly hairy and with blackish livery. The head is holoptic in the males of most species, and dichoptic in females. It is provided with three ocelli. The pendulous antennae are composed of three segments the two basal segments short and the third elongated; ‘modified’; with a nonannulated flagellum. The mouthparts are of the sucking type with the labrum (proboscis) very short and with a fleshy apex, and one- or two-segmented maxillary palps. The thorax is moderately convex, with mesoscutal bristles in the Proratinae. The legs are short and lack arolia and empodia. The wings overlap on the abdomen, in the resting phase. The abdomen is large and cylindrical or flattened, composed of seven apparent urites in males and eight in females.

=== Venation ===
The wing venation differs substantially from that of Therevidae by the number of branches of the media which are reduced to two or three and from that of Bombyliidae in having a simpler radial system. In most of the family, the costa stops short of the wing apex, in correspondence with the termination of R 5 or M 1. An exception is Caenotus, in which the costa extends for the entire margin.

The radius is divided into four branches, with R 2+3 undivided. The entire radial system is positioned in the front half of the wing, without going beyond the axis that connects the base with the apex. R 1 and R 2+3 are relatively short and converge on the costal margin with a short distance between them. R 4 terminates on the costal margin, R 5 terminates before the apex of the wing or, in some genera, at the apex (but R 5 may also converge on the apex as in Cyrtosarthe and Pseudatrichia).

The media is divided into two or three branches. M 1 is always present and usually reaches the wing margin before or at the apex of the wing (e.g. Scenopinus, Prepseudatrichia, Caenotinae, Proratinae); in most genera of Scenopininae, R 5 closes a cell, while in Cyrtosarthe, it converges on the posterior margin; in some Australian species, belonging to the genera Scenopinus and Rekiella, M 1 is incomplete and does not reach the margin. M 2 is missing in the majority of the Scenopininae, but it is present in the Proratinae in Cyrtosarthe and Caenotus and runs into on the posterior border.

In these genera, the bifurcation of M 1+2 coincides with the front apex of the distal discal cell, or is placed in a distal position with respect to the cell. M 3 is absent in the whole family, M 4 is always present, but in Seguyia it is incomplete and does not reach the margin.

The conformation of the cells is strictly dependent on the morphology of the venation: the marginal cell is very narrow and opens as does the submarginal on the costal margin; the first rear cell is relatively long and opens close to the apex of the wing. The discal cell has a pentagonal shape (quadrangular in the Scenopininae) apparently due to the absence of vein M 2 and the first basal cell is generally much longer than the second due to the development in length of the discal and the position of the radio-medial vein .

Diagram of wing veins in Scenopinus

Diagram of wing veins in Pseudatrichia or Metatrichia

== Biology ==
In general, the larvae of the Scenopinidae colonize the sandy soils of arid environments or dry litter and feed by preying on other soil arthropods. Frequently, however, they are, always as predators, in other habitats, such as wood and other substrates, decomposing organic, dens and nests of mammals and birds, and sometimes domestic environments. The latter habit, derived from a secondary synanthropic adaptation, is frequent in some species of the genus Scenopinus. In this case, the larvae prey on insect pests of clothing (moths), foodstuffs (larvae of moths and beetles), wood (termites) or zooparasites associated with humans or domestic animals, such as dust mites and fleas. Adults feed on nectar and honeydew .

== Systematics ==
In the past, the Scenopinidae included only the current subfamily Scenopininae, while the other genera known at that time were placed in other families. Prorates was described and classified by Melander (1906) among Empididae and Caenotus was described and classified by Cole (1923) within Therevidae. Currently Prorates and other members of the former Bombyliidae subfamily Proratinae, as well as Caenotus, are included in Scenopinidae, sharing apomorphies with other Scenopinidae, resulting in three subfamilies: the Caenotinae, the Proratinae, and the Scenopininae.

- Subfamily Caenotinae: Caenotus.
- Subfamily Proratinae: Acaenotus, Alloxytropus, Caenotoides, Jackhallia, Prorates.
- Subfamily Scenopininae: Belosta, Brevitrichia, Caenoneura, Heteromphrale, Irwiniana, Metatrichia, Neopseudatrichia, Paramonova, Paratrichia, Prepseudatrichia, Propebrevitrichia, Pseudatrichia, Riekiella, Scenopinus, Seguyia, Stenomphrale.
- Incertae sedis: Cyrtosathe.

- Asiloidea
  - N.N.
    - ? Scenopinidae and Therevidae
    - ? Mydidae and Apioceridae
    - ? Asilidae
  - Bombyliidae

Clade showing relationship of Asiloidea

The oldest known member of the family is Burmaprorates alagracilis from the mid Cretaceous Burmese amber of Myanmar, which belongs to the subfamily Proratinae.

== Zoogeography ==
The family is worldwide, and while the Nearctic realm has the most species, this may be because other parts of the world are far less intensively studied and many new species remain undiscovered.
