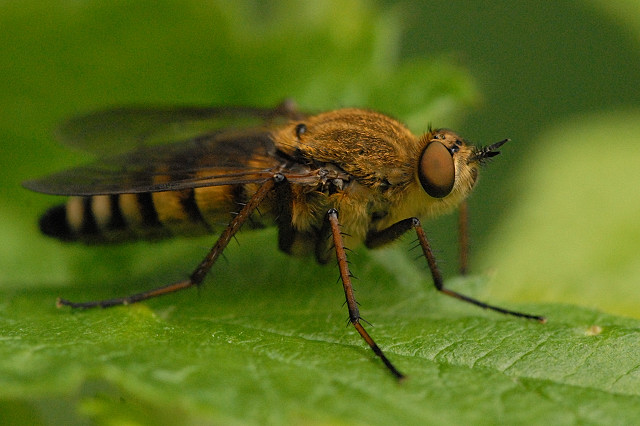
- Thereva nobilitata female

Scientific classification
- Kingdom: Animalia
- Phylum: Arthropoda
- Class: Insecta
- Order: Diptera
- Superfamily: Asiloidea
- Family: Therevidae; Newman, 1834

Subfamilies
- Agapophytinae; Phycinae; Therevinae; Xestomyzinae

= Therevidae =

Therevidae Temporal range: Aptian–Recent

Family of flies

The Therevidae are a family of flies of the superfamily Asiloidea commonly known as stiletto flies. The family contains about 1,600 described species worldwide, most diverse in arid and semiarid regions with sandy soils. The larvae are predators of insect larvae in soil.

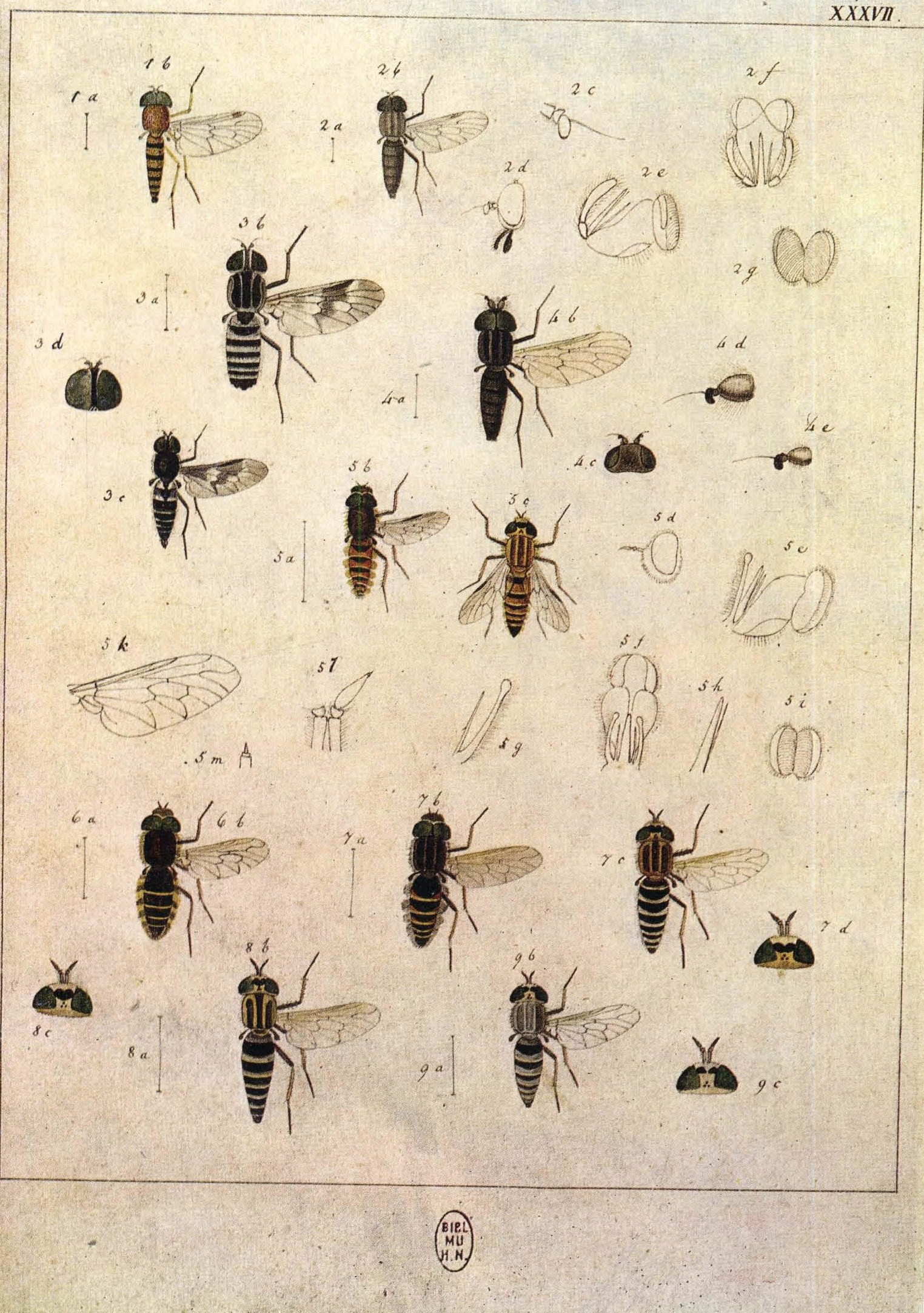
Plate from Johann Wilhelm Meigen EuropäischenZweiflügeligen.Showing the gross features mentioned in the text (figures 5-9)

== Description ==
Adult Therevidae are small- to medium-sized with a body length of 2.4 to 18 mm and a hairy integument. The coloration ranges from shades of yellow to black, but commonly the background colour is masked by the tomentum.

The compound eyes are generally larger in males, which in many species are actually holoptic. Females have well-developed compound eyes, but are clearly dichoptic. There are three ocelli. The antennae are relatively short. The scape is elongated, the pedicel very short, and the first flagellomere is conical and elongated, the apex bearing a compound stylus with one to three segments. The scape and pedicel are pubescent;

In contrast to the related and confusingly similar family Asilidae, the labium in the Therevidae is not a piercing, predatory organ, but ends in two fleshy labella adapted to the sucking of liquid foods. Another difference is that, though Therevidae commonly have fluffy setae above the mouthparts, the setae are not stiff bristles like the protective chaetae comprising the mystax of most species of Asilidae. Furthermore, in the Asilidae the depression on the vertex between the eyes, tends to be more obvious than in the Therevidae.

The thorax is broad and moderately convex, with long bristles (macrotrichae). The legs are long and slender, with femora and tibiae bearing bristles; the tibiae are without apical spurs and the tarsi are provided with empodia or without the median pretarsal. The wings are well developed, hyaline or opaque, often with pigmentation of the veins located at the termination of the transverse and longitudinal veins.

The abdomen is tapered and elongated, typically 3 to 4 times as long as its broadest width when not extended for activities such as oviposition. Eight abdominal segments (uriti) are externally visible.

Diagram of wing veins. Longitudinal veins: C: costa; Sc: subcosta; R: radius; M: media; Cu: cubitus; A: anal. Crossveins: h: humeral; r-m: radio-medial; m-m: medial; m-cu: medio-cubital.Cells: d: discal; br: 1st basal; bm: 2nd basal; r1: marginal; r3: 1st submarginal; r4: 2nd submarginal; r5: 1st posterior; m1: 2nd posterior; m2: 3rd posterior; m3: 4th posterior; cup: cell cup

The wing venation is relatively complex but without a particular conformation to distinguish the Therevidae from other families of Asiloidea. The radius is divided into four branches, with R 2 +3 undivided. The branch R 4 is long and winding and reaches the costal margin, the branch R 5 terminates on the posterior border, so the second submarginal cell is open at the apex of the wing. The media is divided into four branches, all independent but with M 3 and M 4 convergent. The transverse medial vein closes the discal cell. This has an elongated shape and terminates at the apex with three angles from which the first three branches of media spring. The fourth branch, M 4 (or CuA 1 according to a different interpretation), originates from the apex of the posterior basal discal cell. The cubit and anal converge on a short common branch before reaching the apex.

The larva is apodous and eucephalic, cylindrical, very long and thin, and with tapered ends. The integument is smooth, white, or pink. The head capsule is well developed, but narrower than the other regions.

== Biology ==
Oviposition of Thereva cincta

Knowledge of the biology of the Therevidae is limited and fragmented. The lifecycle is usually carried out in a single generation per year, although some European Therevidae have a cycle of two or more years. The overwintering stage is represented by the mature larva. The postembryonic development in known forms, five instars and pupation takes place in the spring.

The larvae, like those of other Asiloidea, have an entomophagous diet and they live as predators. They are generally found on dry, sandy soils and dry litter. Larvae also are located in other substrates such as decomposing organic matter and under the bark of trees. Among the prey are the larvae and pupae of Diptera, Coleoptera, and Lepidoptera. The observation of the behaviour of known forms highlights voracious feeding and agile movements. When exposed to light, the larvae of the Therevidae dig back into the substrate with rapid movements.

Adults feed mainly on nectar, honeydew, and pollen, but they occasionally feed on liquid secretions of animal or vegetable origin. They are found in various environments and can be found in streams, meadows, open woodlands, or, like many other Asiloidea, in dry and sandy places or on beaches. At rest, they choose various substrates according to the species: some species rest on the ground, others on rocks, vegetation, or intertidal debris. They are generally diurnal and move in short, quick flights. Although inhabiting semiarid regions, or possibly for that very reason, since that is where prey for their larvae are likely to be plentiful, adults are particularly attracted to water, generally remaining near pools or other sources of moisture.

== Systematics and phylogeny ==
The family Therevidae is little known and it resembles many other Brachycera, both in morphology and ethology. The taxonomic history of the Therevidae accordingly has undergone repeated revisions; in the past, many therevids were assigned to other families, and many other Brachycera were assigned to the Therevidae. Since the 1970s however, there has been a great deal of rationalisation of the taxonomy, particularly by Lyneborg and Irwin. Revision of the higher taxa, based on the phylogenetic cladistic relationships between various groups of Asiloidea has led to a better understanding of their ranks and interrelationships.

Originally the Therevidae sensu lato, were polyphyletic. It required the reassignment of some subfamilies to other families, together with adjustments to closely related families in the Asiloidea, to establish consistent phylogenetic relationships. The Therevidae now constitute a monophyletic clade that English-speaking dipterologists call the therevoid clade (clade of "Terevoidi"). This group has not been assigned a ranking at any taxonomic level above the rank of family, but for the present is recognised as a group of families within the superfamily Asiloidea.

Therevoid clade

- Therevoid clade
  - Apsilocephalidae
  - - Evocoidae
    - - Scenopinidae
      - Therevidae

- Asiloidea
  - N.N.
    - ? Scenopinidae and Therevidae
    - ? Mydidae und Apioceridae
    - ? Asilidae
  - Bombyliidae

Clade showing relationship of Asiloidea

At present, over 1, 600 species are known. After taxonomic revisions by Lyneborg (1976) and Winterston et al. (2001), the family is divided into four subfamilies, among which the most representative in size and diffusion is the Therevinae:

- Agapophytinae: 12 genera
- Phycinae: 13 genera
- Therevinae: 84 genera
- Xestomyzinae: 12 genera

In addition to the 121 living genera are several extinct genera known from Cenozoic deposits including Dasystethos, Glaesorthactia, Kroeberiella, and Palaeopherocera, in doubt is Helicorhaphe. The oldest known member of the family is Cretothereva from the Early Cretaceous (Aptian) Crato Formation of Brazil.

== Habitat and distribution ==
The habitat of the Therevidae is more varied than that of other Asiloidea, but as in Asiloidea, preferred ecosystems better suit the larvae, so these insects are more common in thickets of xerophilous plants (garrigue and maquis, in deserts and on sandy beaches.

The Therevidae are represented in all zoogeographical regions of the Earth. The Therevinae are present in all continents, with a lower frequency in the eastern region . The Phycinae have spread to the Afrotropical and the Holarctic. The Xestomyzinae are mainly Afrotropical. The Agapophytinae are endemic to the Australasian realm.

In Europe, only the subfamilies are represented:- Phycinae, with two genera, and Therevinae, with 15 genera. A total of 98 species are reported, two-thirds of which belong to the genus Thereva.

== Species lists ==
- Palaearctic
- Nearctic
- Australasian/Oceanian
- Japan
- World list
- List of soldierflies and allies of Great Britain

== Identification ==
Cole, F.R., 1923. A revision of the North American two-winged flies of the family Therevidae. Proceedings of the U.S. National Museum, 62(4), 1-140.

Cole, F.R., 1960 Stiletto-flies of the genus Furcifera Kröber (Diptera: Therevidae). Annals of the Entomological Society of America, 53, 160-169.

Gaimari, S.D., & M.E. Irwin, 2000. Phylogeny, classification, and biogeography of the cycloteline Therevinae (Insecta: Diptera: Therevidae). Zoological Journal of the Linnean Society, 129, 129-240.

Irwin, M.E., & L. Lyneborg, 1981. The genera of Nearctic Therevidae. Illinois Natural History Bulletin, (1980) 32, 193-277.

Irwin, M.E., & D.W. Webb, 1992. Brasilian Therevidae (Diptera): a checklist and descriptions (sic) of species. Acta Amazonica, (1991) 21, 85-121.

Kröber, O., 1911. Die Thereviden Süd- und Mittelamerikas. Annales Musei Nationalis Hungarici, 9, 475-529. Keys genera, species.

Kröber, O., 1912. Die Thereviden der indo-australischen Region. Keys genera, species.

Kröber, O., 1913. Therevidae.Genera.Ins. Keys (then) world genera. Keys genera, species.

Kröber, O., 1914. Beiträge zur Kenntnis der Thereviden und Omphraliden. Jahrbuch der Hamburgischen Wissenschaftlichen Anstalten, (1913) 31, 29-74.

Kröber, O., 1924_1925. Therevidae. Fiegen palaerakt. Reg. 4 (26):1-60

Kröber, O., 1928. Neue und wenig bekannte Dipteren aus den Familien Omphralidae, Conopidae, und Therevidae. Konowia Zeitschrift für Systematische Insektenkunde, 7, 113-134.

Kröber, O., 1931. The Therevidae (Diptera) of South Africa. Ann. Transv. Mus.. 14:103-134. (see also Lyneborg).

Lyneborg, L. 1972. A revision of the Xestomyza-group of Therevidae. (Diptera). Annals of the Natal Museum 21: 297–376. Keys African genera, species.

Lyneborg, L. 1976. A revision of the Therevine stiletto-flies (Diptera: Therevidae) of the Ethiopian Region. Bull. British Mus. (Nat. Hist.). Entomology 33 (3): 191-346. Keys subfamilies and genera of Thervinae.

Malloch, J. R. 1932. Rhagionidae, Therevidae. British Museum (Natural History). Dept. of Entomology [eds] Diptera of Patagonia and South Chile, based mainly on material in the British Museum (Natural History). Part V. Fascicle 3. - Rhagionidae (Leptidae), Therevidae, Scenopenidae, Mydaidae, Asilidae, Lonchopteridae. pp. 199–293. Keys genera, species.

Mann, JS.1928-1933 Revisional notes on Australian Therevidae. Part 1. Australian Zoologist, 5, 151–. 194 (1928); Part 2 6:17-49 (1929); Part 3 7:325-344. (1933).

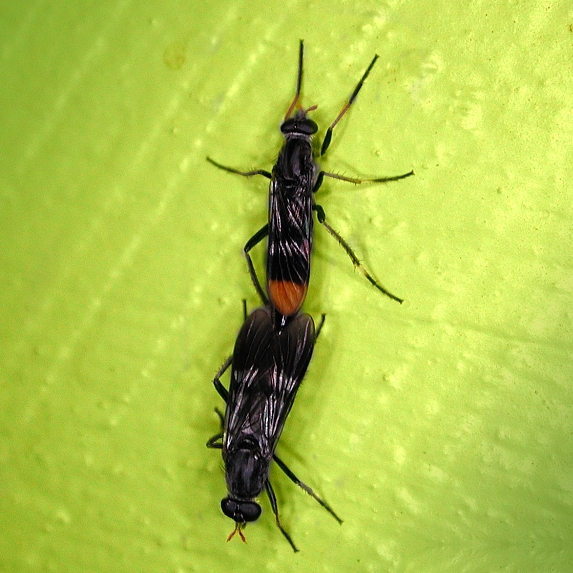
Mating (species from Queensland, Australia)

Acrosathe annulata on the ground (video, 1m 48s)

== See also ==
- List of Therevidae genera
