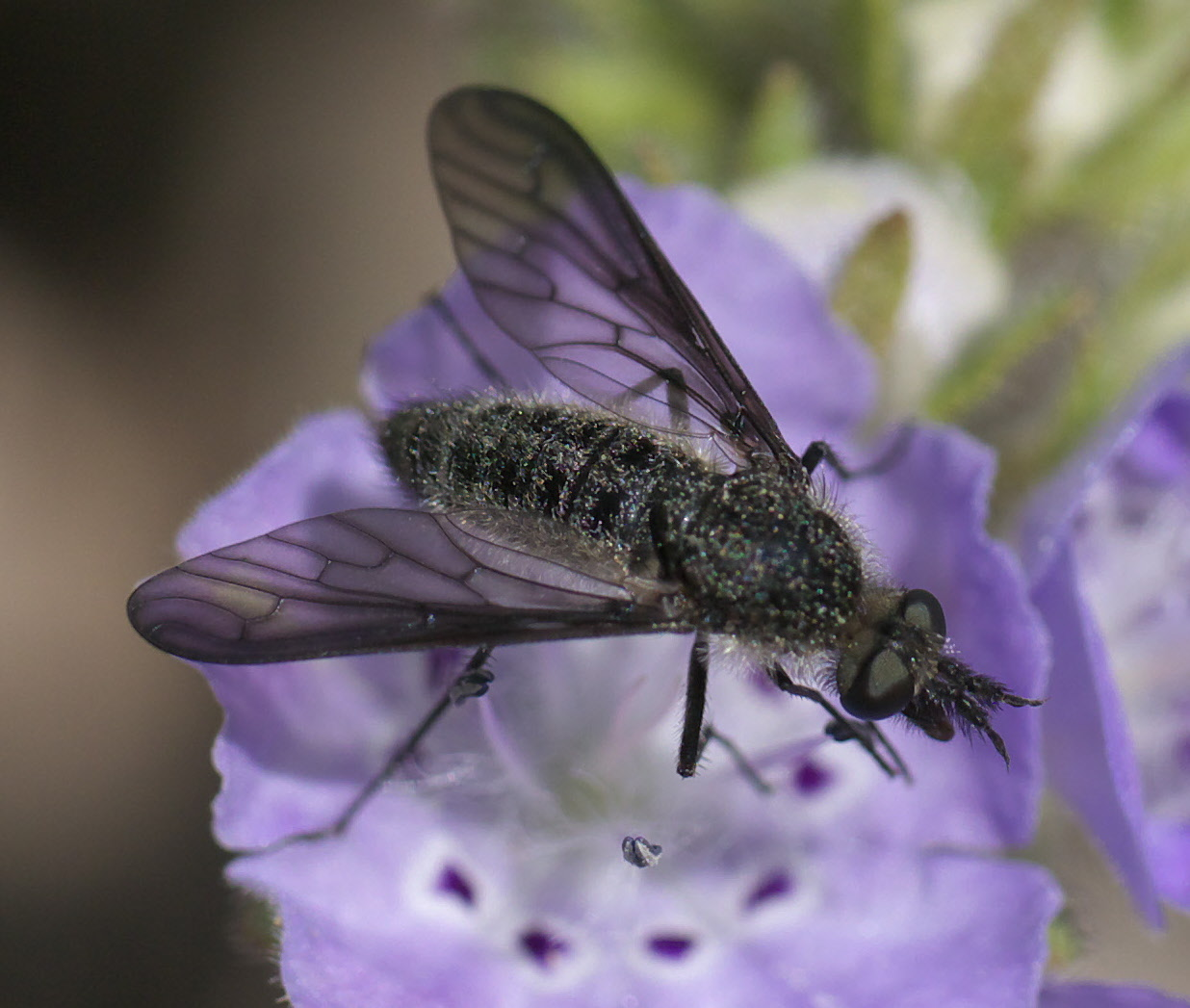
- Aldrichia ehrmanii

Scientific classification
- Domain: Eukaryota
- Kingdom: Animalia
- Phylum: Arthropoda
- Class: Insecta
- Order: Diptera
- Family: Bombyliidae
- Subfamily: Bombyliinae

= Bombyliinae =

Subfamily of flies

Bombyliinae is a subfamily of bee flies in the family Bombyliidae. There are more than 70 genera in Bombyliinae.

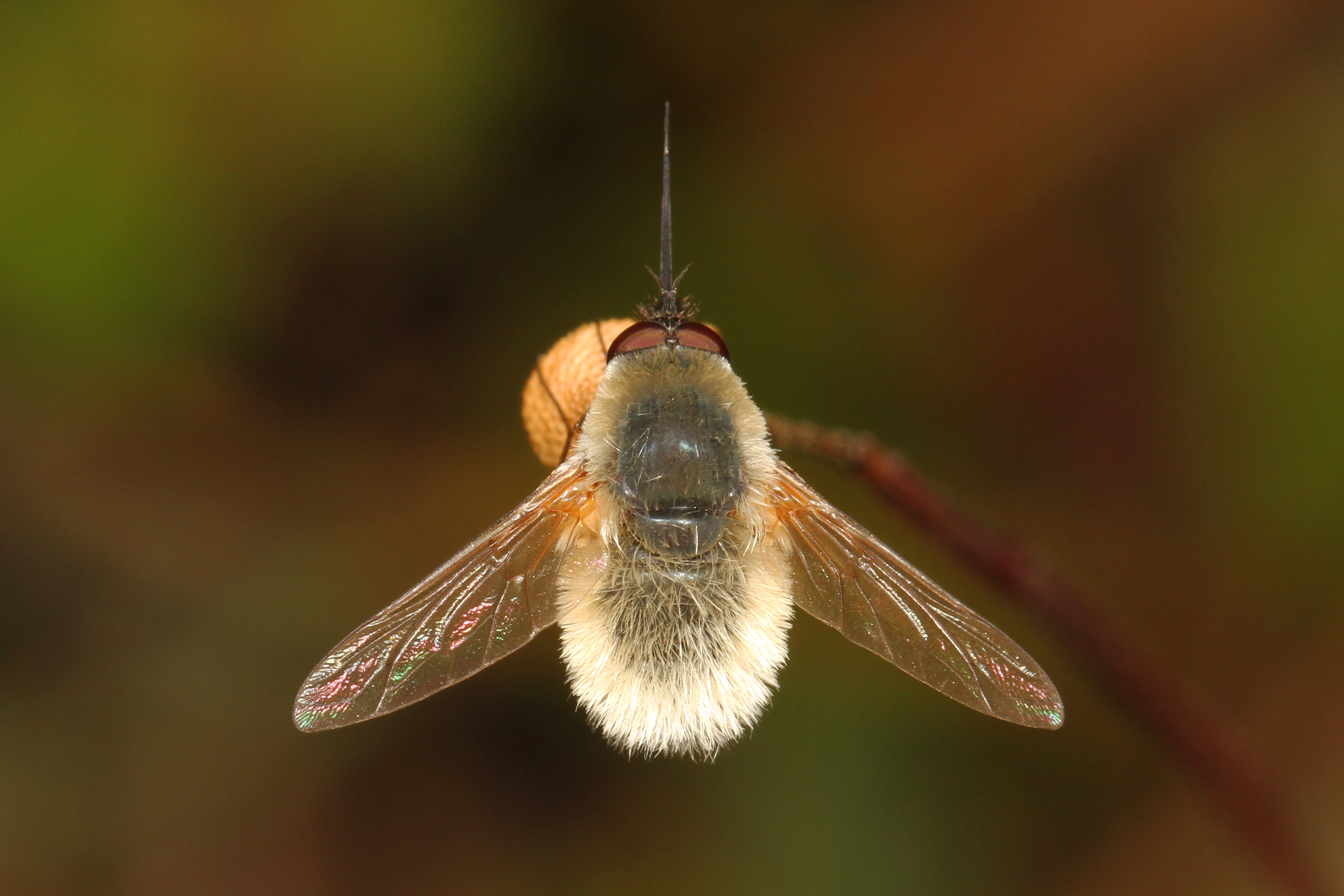
Systoechus candidulus, Florida

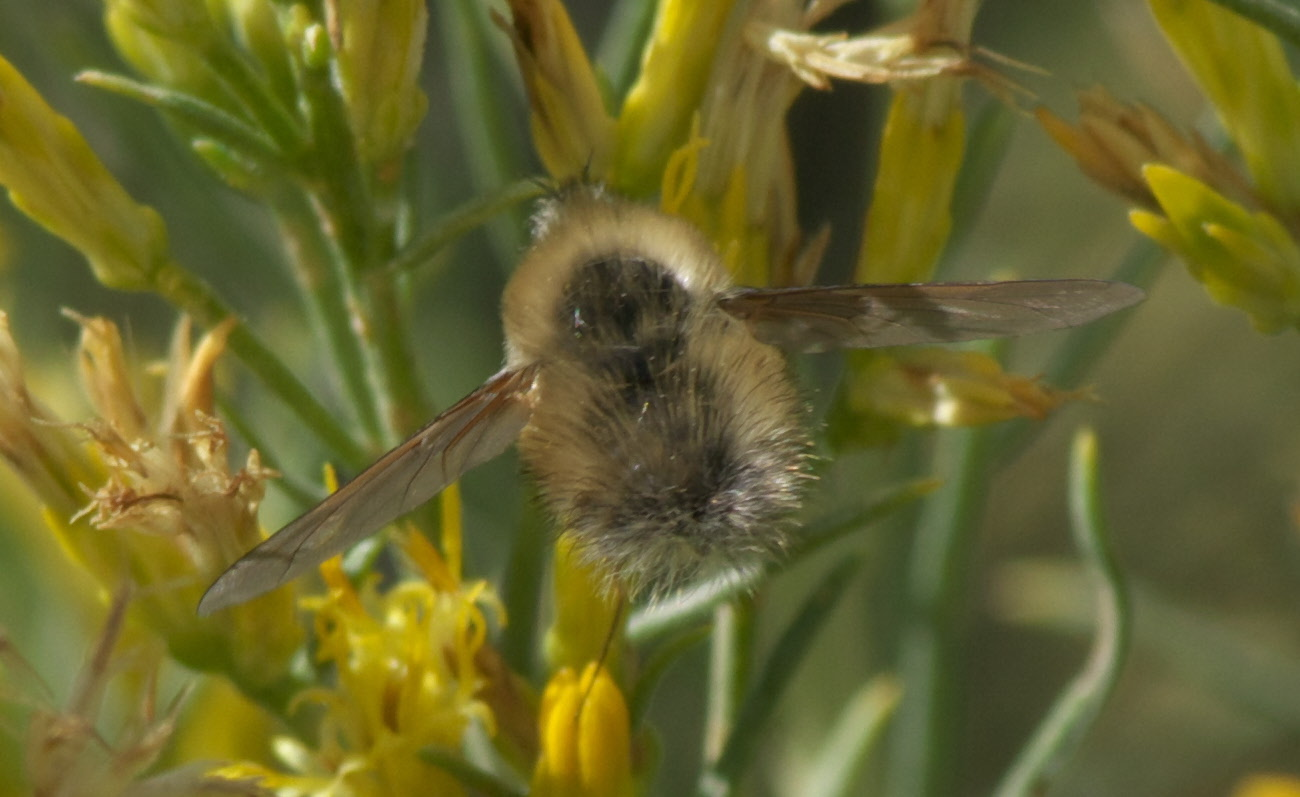
Anastoechus

== Genera ==
These genera and tribes belong to the subfamily Bombyliinae:

Subfamily Bombyliinae Latreille, 1802

- Tribe Acrophthalmydini Hull
  - Genus Acrophthalmyda Bigot, 1858
  - Genus Paramonovius Li & Yeates, 2019
  - Genus Sisyromyia White, 1916
- Tribe Adelidini Li & Yeates, 2019
  - Genus Adelidea Macquart, 1840
  - Genus Platamomyia Brèthes, 1924
  - Genus Sosiomyia Bezzi, 1921
- Tribe Bombyliini Latreille, 1802
  - Genus Anastoechus Osten Sacken, 1877
  - Genus Australoechus Greathead, 1995
  - Genus Beckerellus Greathead, 1995
  - Genus Bombomyia Greathead, 1995
  - Genus Bombylella Greathead, 1995
  - Genus Bombylisoma Rondani, 1856
  - Genus Bombylius Linnæus, 1758
  - Genus Choristus Walker, 1852
  - Genus Cryomyia Hull, 1973
  - Genus Dissodesma
  - Genus Doliogethes Hesse, 1938
  - Genus Efflatounia Bezzi, 1924
  - Genus Eremyia Greathead, 1996
  - Genus Eristalopsis Evenhuis, 1985
  - Genus Euchariomyia Bigot
  - Genus Eurycarenus Loew, 1860
  - Genus Heterostylum Macquart, 1848
  - Genus Karakumia Paramonov, 1926
  - Genus Lambkinomyia
  - Genus Lepidochlanus Hesse, 1938
  - Genus Mandella Evenhuis, 1983
  - Genus Meomyia Evenhuis, 1983
  - Genus Nectaropota Philippi, 1865
  - Genus Neobombylodes Evenhuis, 1978
  - Genus Nigromyia
  - Genus Parachistus Greathead, 1980
  - Genus Parasystoechus Hall, 1975
  - Genus Parisus Walker, 1852
  - Genus Semistoechus
  - Genus Staurostichus Hull, 1973
  - Genus Systoechus Loew, 1855
  - Genus Tovlinius Zaitsev, 1979
  - Genus Triplasius Loew, 1855
  - Genus Triploechus Edwards, 1937
  - Genus Xerachistus Greathead, 1995
  - Genus Zentamyia
  - Genus Zinnomyia Hesse, 1955
- Tribe Conophorini Becker
  - Genus Aldrichia Coquillett, 1894
  - Genus Conophorina Becker, 1920
  - Genus Conophorus Meigen, 1803
  - Genus Sparnopolius Loew, 1855
- Tribe Dischistini Hull
  - Genus Dischistus Loew, 1855
  - Genus Eusurbus Roberts, 1929
  - Genus Gonarthrus Bezzi, 1921
  - Genus Isocnemus Bezzi, 1924
  - Genus Laurella Heraty, 2002
  - Genus Pilosia Hull, 1973
  - Genus Robertsmyia
  - Genus Sericusia Edwards, 1937
  - Genus Sisyrophanus Karsch, 1886
- Tribe Eclimini Hull
  - Genus Cyrtomyia Bigot, 1892
  - Genus Eclimus Loew, 1844
  - Genus Lepidophora Westwood, 1835
  - Genus Palintonus François, 1964
  - Genus Thevenetimyia Bigot, 1875
  - Genus Tillyardomyia Tonnoir, 1927
- Tribe Hallidini Li & Yeates, 2019
  - Genus Hallidia Hull, 1970
  - Genus Legnotomyia Bezzi, 1902
  - Genus Notolegnotus Greathead & Evenhuis, 2001
  - Genus Prorachthes Loew, 1869
- Tribe Marmasomini Li & Yeates, 2019
  - Genus Marmasoma White, 1917
  - Genus Paratoxophora Engel, 1936
- Tribe Nothoschistini Li & Yeates, 2019
  - Genus Cacoplox Hull, 1970
  - Genus Euprepina Hull, 1971
  - Genus Nothoschistus Bowden, 1985
- Genus Neodischistus Painter, 1933
