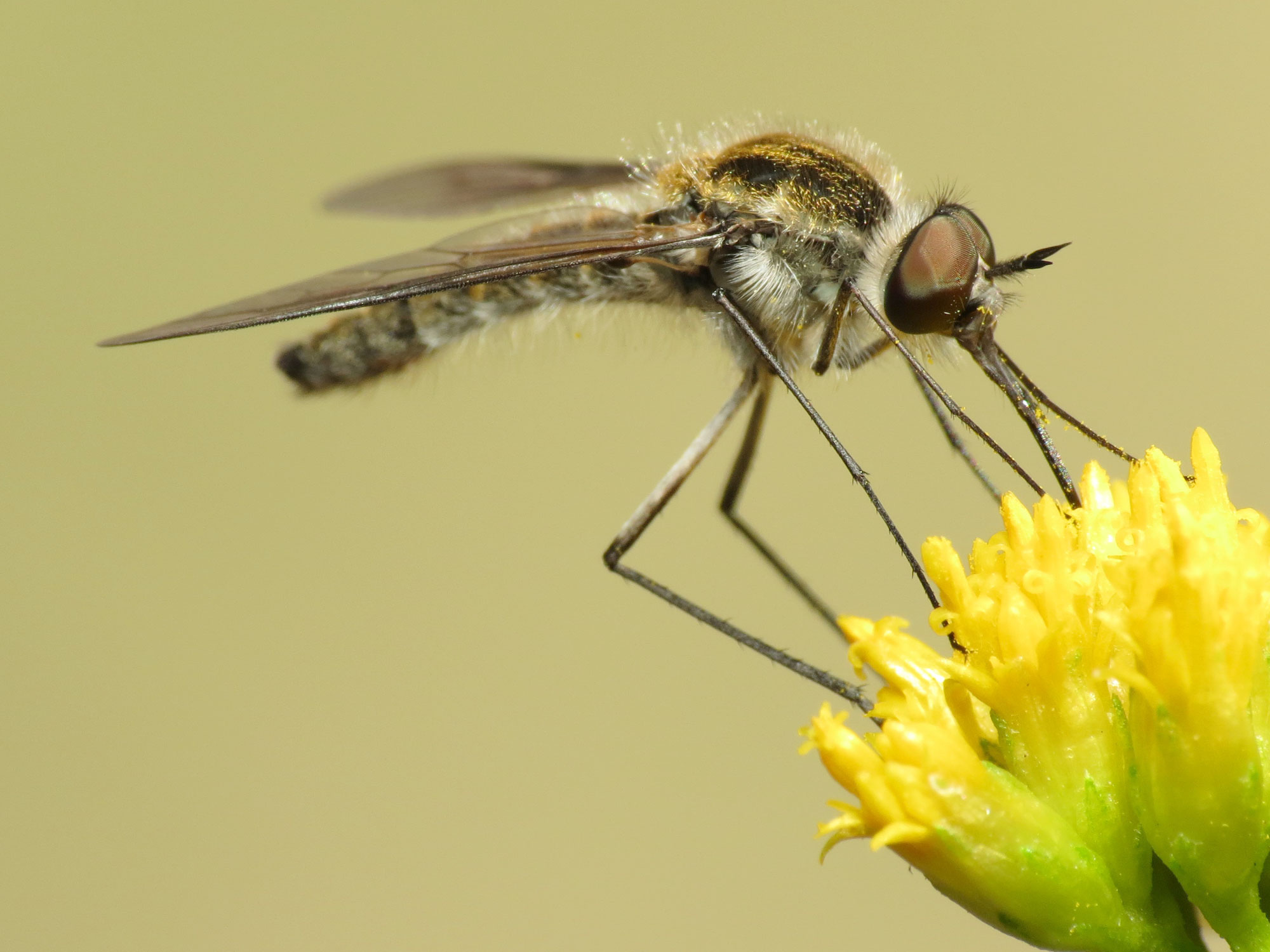

Scientific classification
- Domain: Eukaryota
- Kingdom: Animalia
- Phylum: Arthropoda
- Class: Insecta
- Order: Diptera
- Family: Bombyliidae
- Genus: Thevenetimyia
- Species: T. speciosa

Binomial name
- Thevenetimyia speciosa Hall, 1969

= Thevenetimyia speciosa =

Species of fly

Thevenetimyia speciosa is a species of bee fly in the family Bombyliidae. It is known from Arizona.

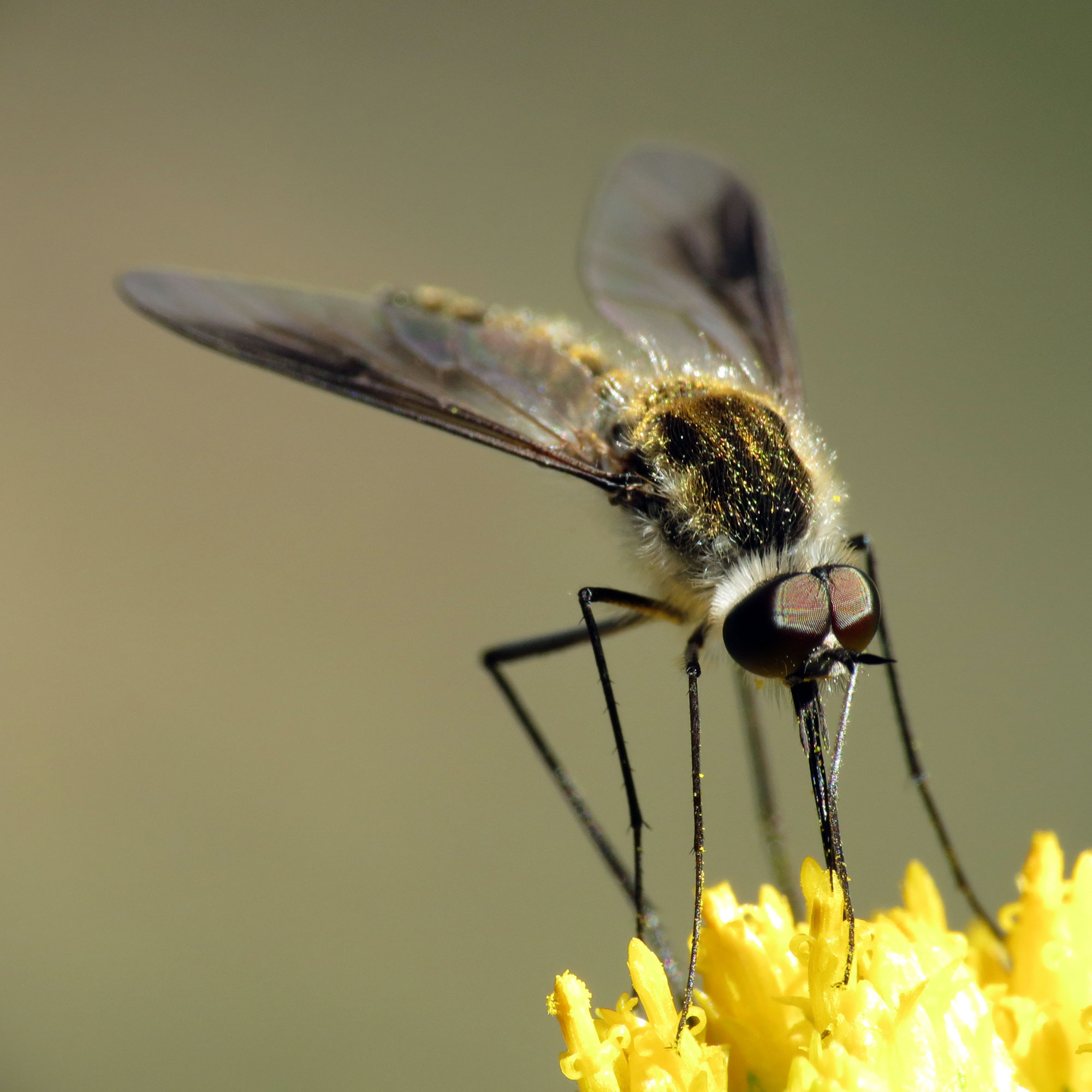
