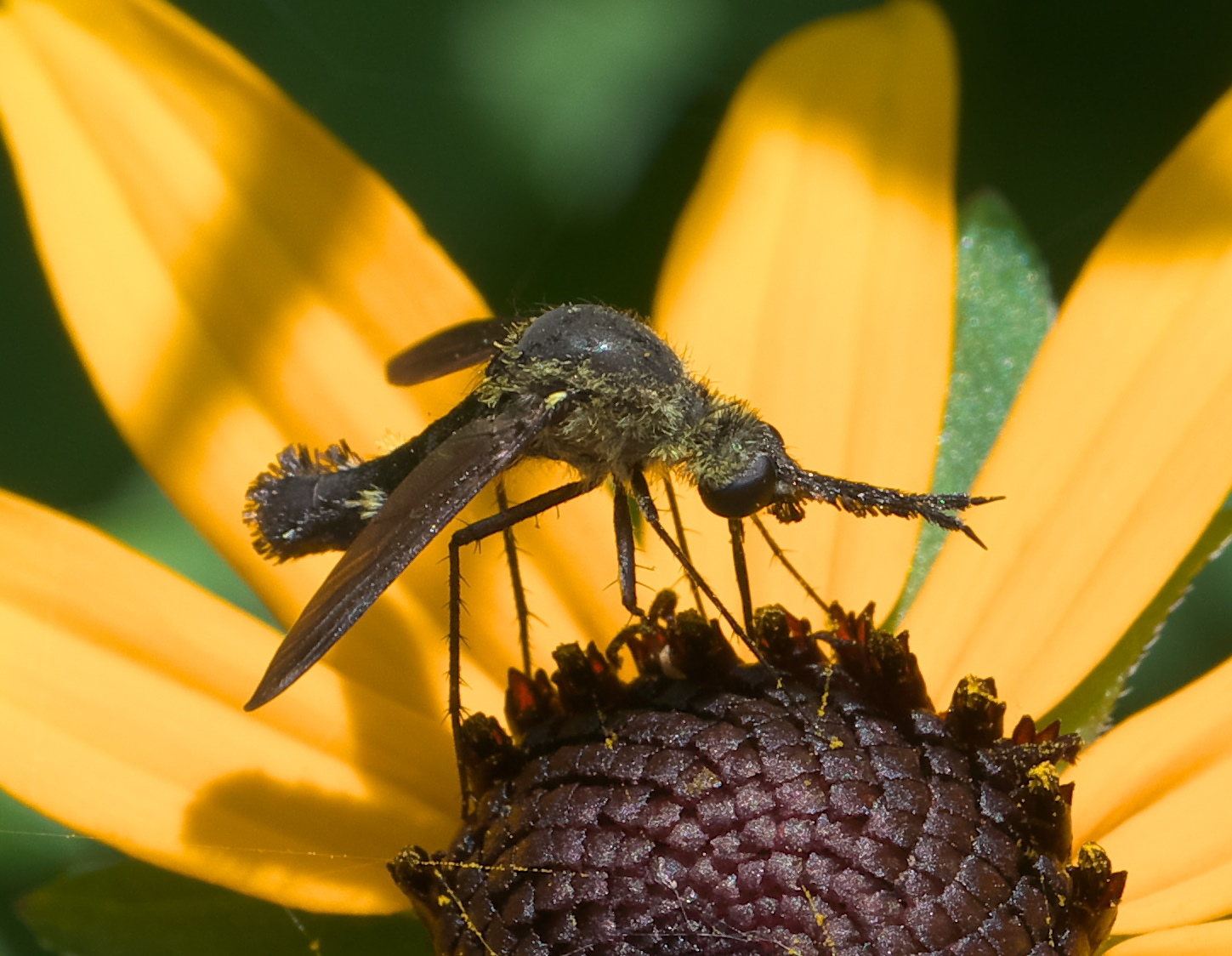
- Lepidophora lepidocera

Scientific classification
- Domain: Eukaryota
- Kingdom: Animalia
- Phylum: Arthropoda
- Class: Insecta
- Order: Diptera
- Family: Bombyliidae
- Subfamily: Bombyliinae
- Tribe: Eclimini; Hull

= Eclimini =

Subfamily of insects

Eclimini is a tribe of bee flies in the family Bombyliidae. This tribe was formerly considered a subfamily of Bombyliidae, but was transferred to the subfamily Bombyliinae as a result of research published in 2019.

== Genera ==
These seven genera belong to the tribe Eclimini:

- Cyrtomyia Bigot, 1892
- Eclimus Loew, 1844
- Lepidophora Westwood, 1835
- Palintonus François, 1964
- Thevenetimyia Bigot, 1875
- Tillyardomyia Tonnoir, 1927
- † Alepidophora Cockerell, 1909
