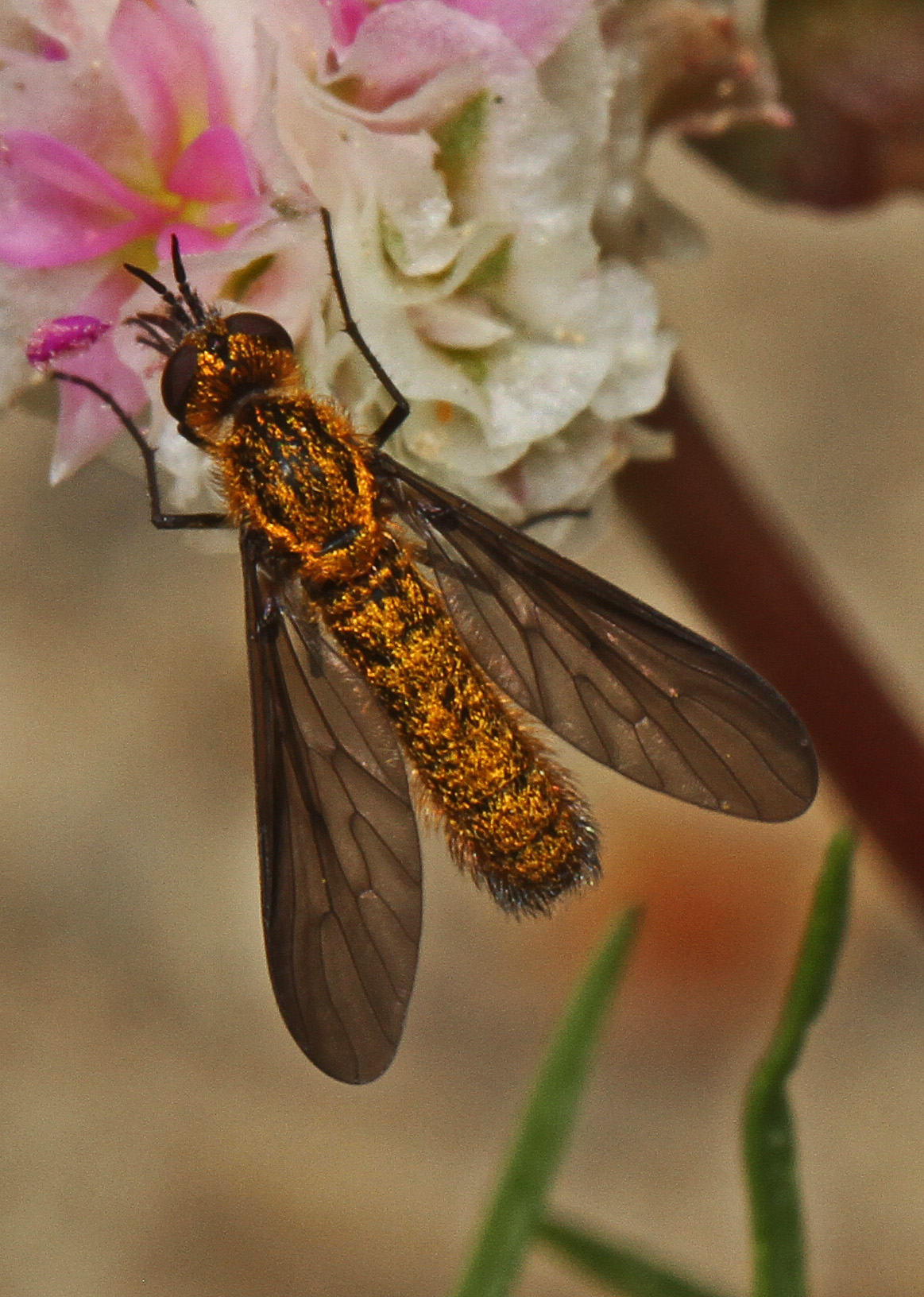

Scientific classification
- Domain: Eukaryota
- Kingdom: Animalia
- Phylum: Arthropoda
- Class: Insecta
- Order: Diptera
- Family: Bombyliidae
- Genus: Thevenetimyia
- Species: T. luctifera

Binomial name
- Thevenetimyia luctifera (Osten Sacken, 1877)

= Thevenetimyia luctifera =

Species of fly

Thevenetimyia luctifera is a species of bee fly in the family Bombyliidae. It is found in western North America from Mexico north to British Columbia, Canada, and as far east as Colorado in the United States.
