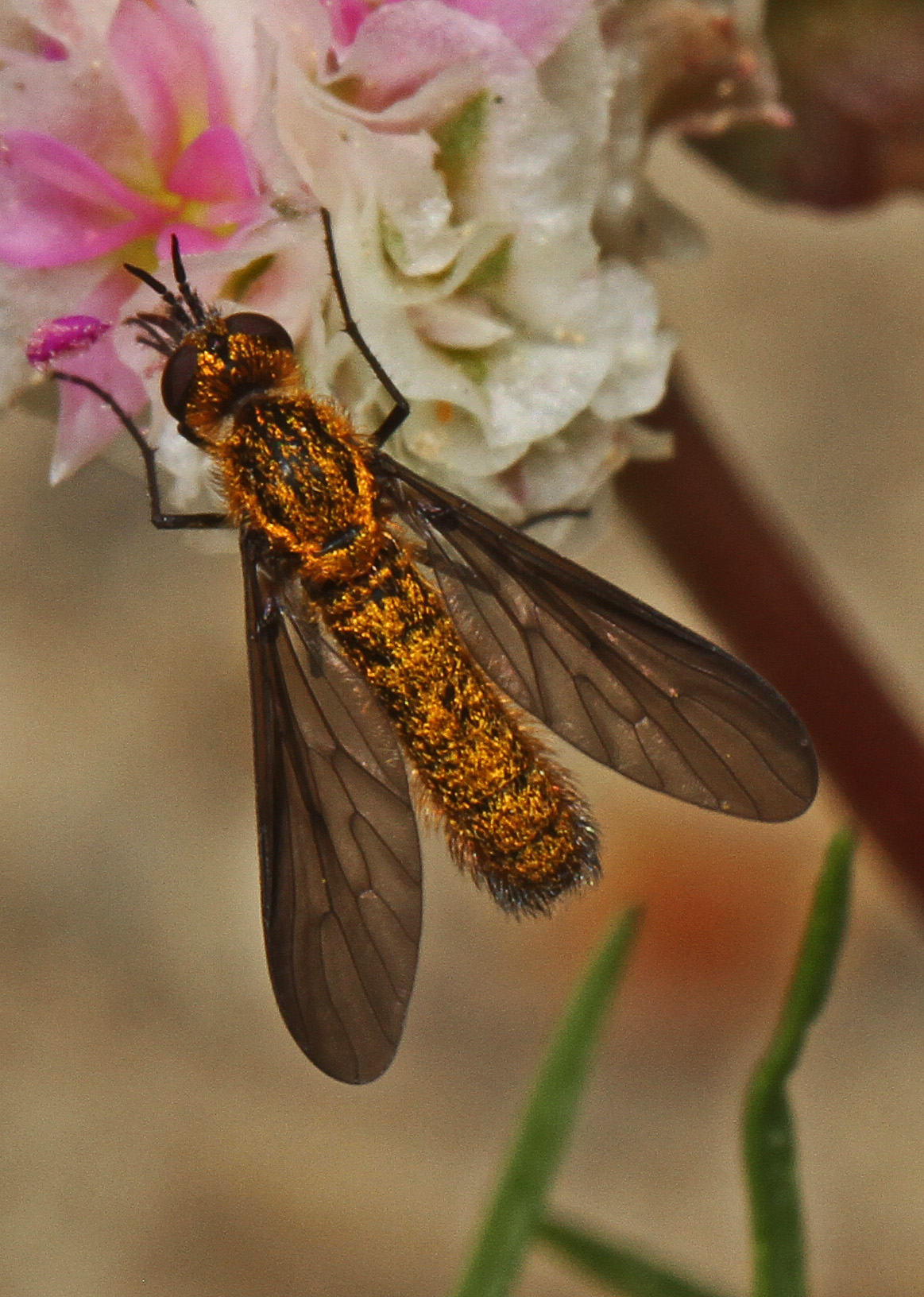
- Thevenetimyia luctifera, California

Scientific classification
- Domain: Eukaryota
- Kingdom: Animalia
- Phylum: Arthropoda
- Class: Insecta
- Order: Diptera
- Family: Bombyliidae
- Subfamily: Bombyliinae
- Tribe: Eclimini
- Genus: Thevenetimyia; Bigot, 1875

Synonyms
- Thevenemyia Bigot, 1875 (misspelling)

= Thevenetimyia =

Genus of flies

Thevenetimyia is a genus of bee flies in the family Bombyliidae. There are more than 40 described species in Thevenetimyia found worldwide, mostly in North America with several species in Australia and southeast Asia.

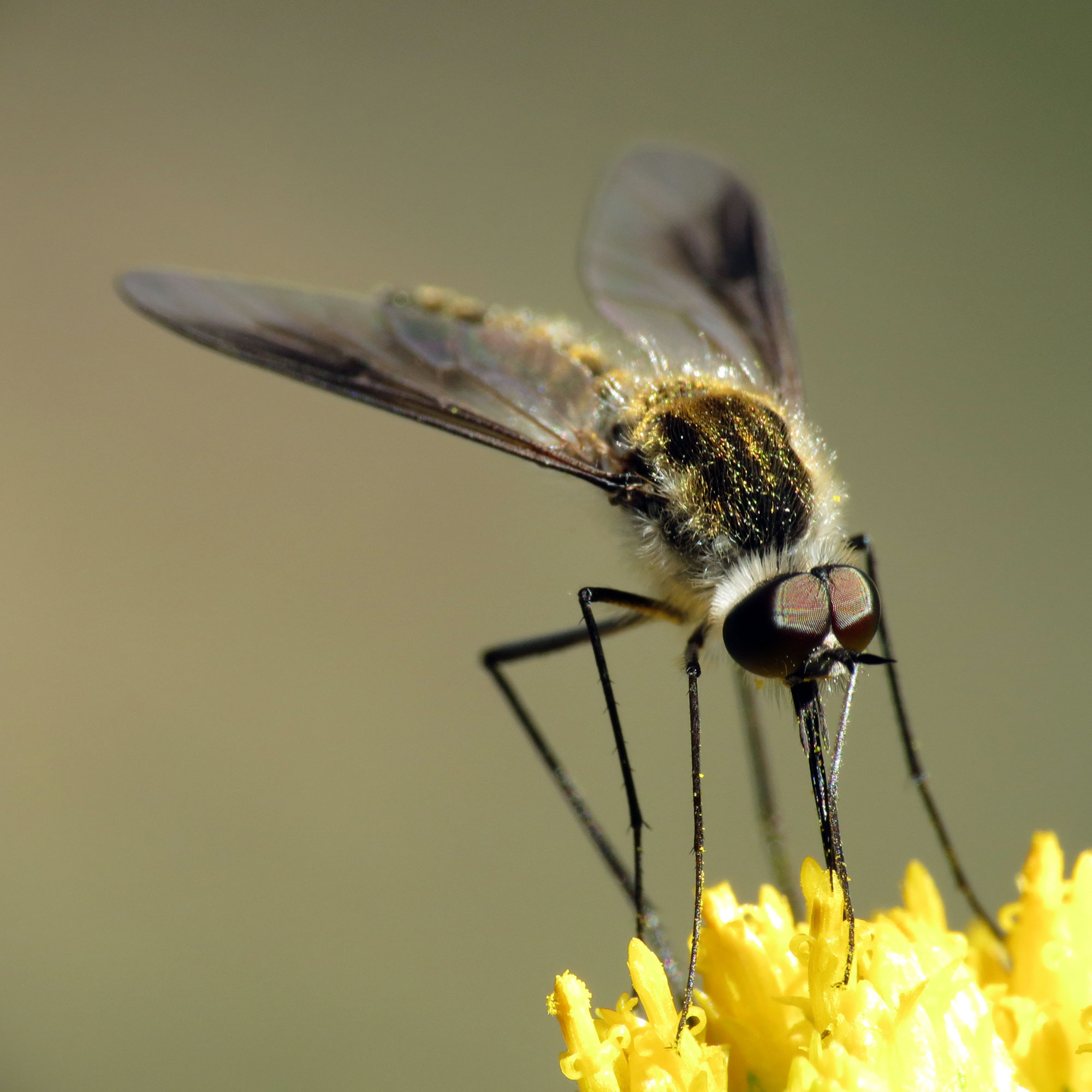
Thevenetimyia speciosa

== Species ==
These 43 species belong to the genus Thevenetimyia:

- Thevenetimyia accedens Hall, 1969
- Thevenetimyia affinis Hall, 1969
- Thevenetimyia auripila (Osten Sacken, 1887)
- Thevenetimyia australiensis (Hall, 1969)
- Thevenetimyia californica Bigot, 1875
- Thevenetimyia canuta Hall, 1969
- Thevenetimyia celer (Cole & Lovett, 1919)
- Thevenetimyia culiciformis (Hull, 1965)
- Thevenetimyia fascipennis (Williston, 1901)
- Thevenetimyia fergusoni Li & Rodrigues, 2018
- Thevenetimyia funesta (Osten Sacken, 1877)
- Thevenetimyia furvicostata (Roberts, 1929)
- Thevenetimyia halli (Hull, 1965)
- Thevenetimyia harrisi (Osten Sacken, 1877)
- Thevenetimyia hirta (Loew, 1876)
- Thevenetimyia intermedia (Hall, 1969)
- Thevenetimyia japonica Evenhuis & Ichige, 2017
- Thevenetimyia lanigera (Cresson, 1919)
- Thevenetimyia longipalpis (Hardy, 1921)
- Thevenetimyia lotus (Williston, 1893)
- Thevenetimyia luctifera (Osten Sacken, 1877)
- Thevenetimyia maculipennis (Hull, 1965)
- Thevenetimyia magna (Osten Sacken, 1877)
- Thevenetimyia major Li & Yeates, 2018
- Thevenetimyia marginata (Osten Sacken, 1877)
- Thevenetimyia melanderi (Hall, 1969)
- Thevenetimyia mimula (Hall, 1969)
- Thevenetimyia muricata (Osten Sacken, 1877)
- Thevenetimyia nigra (Macquart, 1834)
- Thevenetimyia nigrapicalis (Roberts, 1929)
- Thevenetimyia notata Hall, 1969
- Thevenetimyia nuri Rodrigues & Lamas, 2018
- Thevenetimyia painterorum (Hall, 1969)
- Thevenetimyia phalantha Hall, 1969
- Thevenetimyia quadrata (Williston, 1901)
- Thevenetimyia quedenfeldti (Engel, 1885)
- Thevenetimyia sodalis (Williston, 1893)
- Thevenetimyia speciosa Hall, 1969
- Thevenetimyia spinosavus
- Thevenetimyia tenta (Hall, 1969)
- Thevenetimyia tridentata (Hull, 1966)
- Thevenetimyia venosa (Bigot, 1892)
- Thevenetimyia zerrinae Hasbenli, 2005
