= Heterotropus =

Scientific classification
- Domain: Eukaryota
- Kingdom: Animalia
- Phylum: Arthropoda
- Class: Insecta
- Order: Diptera
- Family: Bombyliidae
- Subfamily: Heterotropinae; Becker, 1912
- Genus: Heterotropus; Loew, 1873

Synonyms
- Microrhina Kröber, 1928; Malthacotricha Becker, 1907

Genus of flies

Heterotropus is a genus of bee flies in the family Bombyliidae. It is the only genus in the subfamily Heterotropinae, which formerly contained at least four genera. There are more than 45 species in the genus Heterotropus.
