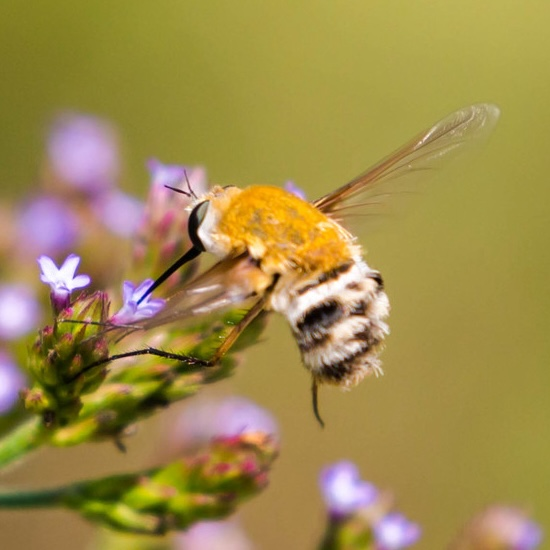
- Heterostylum robustum

Scientific classification
- Kingdom: Animalia
- Phylum: Arthropoda
- Class: Insecta
- Order: Diptera
- Family: Bombyliidae
- Subfamily: Bombyliinae
- Tribe: Bombyliini
- Genus: Heterostylum; Macquart, 1848

Type species
- H. flavum Macquart, 1848

Synonyms
- Comastes Osten Sacken, 1877; Heterostilum Macquart, 1848; Unduloptomyia Evenhuis, 1978

= Heterostylum =

Genus of flies

Heterostylum is a genus of flies belonging to the family Bombyliidae (bee-flies). There are 14 described species, distributed throughout the Americas. These are robust and very hairy flies with a body length of 10–15 mm. They can be distinguished from similar genera by an indentation in the hind margin of the eye and unique wing venation.

Larvae of the genus feed on mining bees.

== Species ==
- Heterostylum bicolor (Loew, 1861) - Neotropical: Cuba.
- Heterostylum croceum Painter, 1930 - Nearctic: USA (Colorado, Kansas, Missouri, New Mexico, Texas)
- Heterostylum deani Painter, 1930 - Nearctic: USA (Colorado, Kansas, Wyoming)
- Heterostylum duocolor (Painter & Painter, 1974) - Neotropical: Argentina
- Heterostylum engelhardti Painter, 1930 - Nearctic: USA (Arizona, California, Texas, Utah).
- Heterostylum evenhuisi Cunha & Lamas, 2005 - Neotropical: Brazil: Bahia, Ceará, Goiás, Pará, Pernambuco, Rio Grande do Norte, São Paulo.
- Heterostylum ferrugineum (Fabricius, 1805) - Neotropical: Bolivia, Brazil (Bahia, Ceará, Mato Grosso, Roraima, São Paulo)
- Heterostylum engelhardti Painter, 1930 - Nearctic: USA (Arizona, California, Texas, Utah).
- Heterostylum haemorrhoicum (Loew, 1863) - Neotropical: Cuba, Haiti.
- Heterostylum helvolum Hall and Evenhuis, 1981 - Nearctic: Mexico (Sinaloa, Sonora, Tamaulipas, Zacatecas).
- Heterostylum hirsutum (Thunberg, 1827) - Neotropical: Argentina, Brazil, Colombia, Paraguay, Venezuela.
- Heterostylum maculipennis Cunha & Lamas, 2005 - Nearctic: Brazil: Rio de Janeiro, Santa Catarina, São Paulo
- Heterostylum pallipes Bigot, 1892 - Neotropical: Haiti.
- Heterostylum robustum (Osten Sacken, 1877) - Nearctic: Canada (Alberta), Mexico (Baja California, Baja California Sur, Coahuila de Zaragoza, Guerrero, Morelos, Nuevo León, Puebla, Sinaloa, Sonora, Tamaulipas), USA (Arizona, California, Colorado, Georgia, Idaho, Kansas, Nevada, New Mexico, Oklahoma, Oregon, Texas, Utah).
- Heterostylum rufum (Oliver, 1789) - Neotropical: Argentina, Brazil (Acre), Guatemala, Guyana, Mexico (Tabasco), Peru, U.S. Virgin Islands.
