= Oligodranes =

Scientific classification
- Domain: Eukaryota
- Kingdom: Animalia
- Phylum: Arthropoda
- Class: Insecta
- Order: Diptera
- Family: Bombyliidae
- Subfamily: Oligodraninae; Evenhuis, 1990
- Genus: Oligodranes; Loew, 1844

Genus of flies

Oligodranes is a genus of bee flies in the family Bombyliidae, the sole genus of the subfamily Oligodraninae.

== Species ==
These three species belong to the genus Oligodranes:

- Oligodranes flavus Paramonov, 1929^{c g}
- Oligodranes israeliensis Zaitzev, 1966^{c g}
- Oligodranes obscuripennis Loew, 1844^{c g}

Data sources: i = ITIS, c = Catalogue of Life, g = GBIF, b = Bugguide.net
