= Crocidiinae =

Scientific classification
- Domain: Eukaryota
- Kingdom: Animalia
- Phylum: Arthropoda
- Class: Insecta
- Order: Diptera
- Family: Bombyliidae
- Subfamily: Crocidiinae; Hull

Subfamily of flies

Crocidiinae is a subfamily of bee flies in the family Bombyliidae. There are about 8 genera and 50 described species in Crocidiinae.

== Genera ==
These eight genera belong to the subfamily Crocidiinae:

- Apatomyza Wiedemann, 1820^{c g}
- Crocidium Loew, 1860^{c g}
- Desmatomyia Williston, 1895^{i c g}
- Inyo Hall & Evenhuis, 1987^{i c g}
- Mallophthiria Edwards, 1930^{c g}
- Megaphthiria Hall, 1976^{c g}
- Semiramis Becker, 1912^{c g}
- Timiomyia Evenhuis, 1978^{c}

Data sources: i = ITIS, c = Catalogue of Life, g = GBIF, b = Bugguide.net
