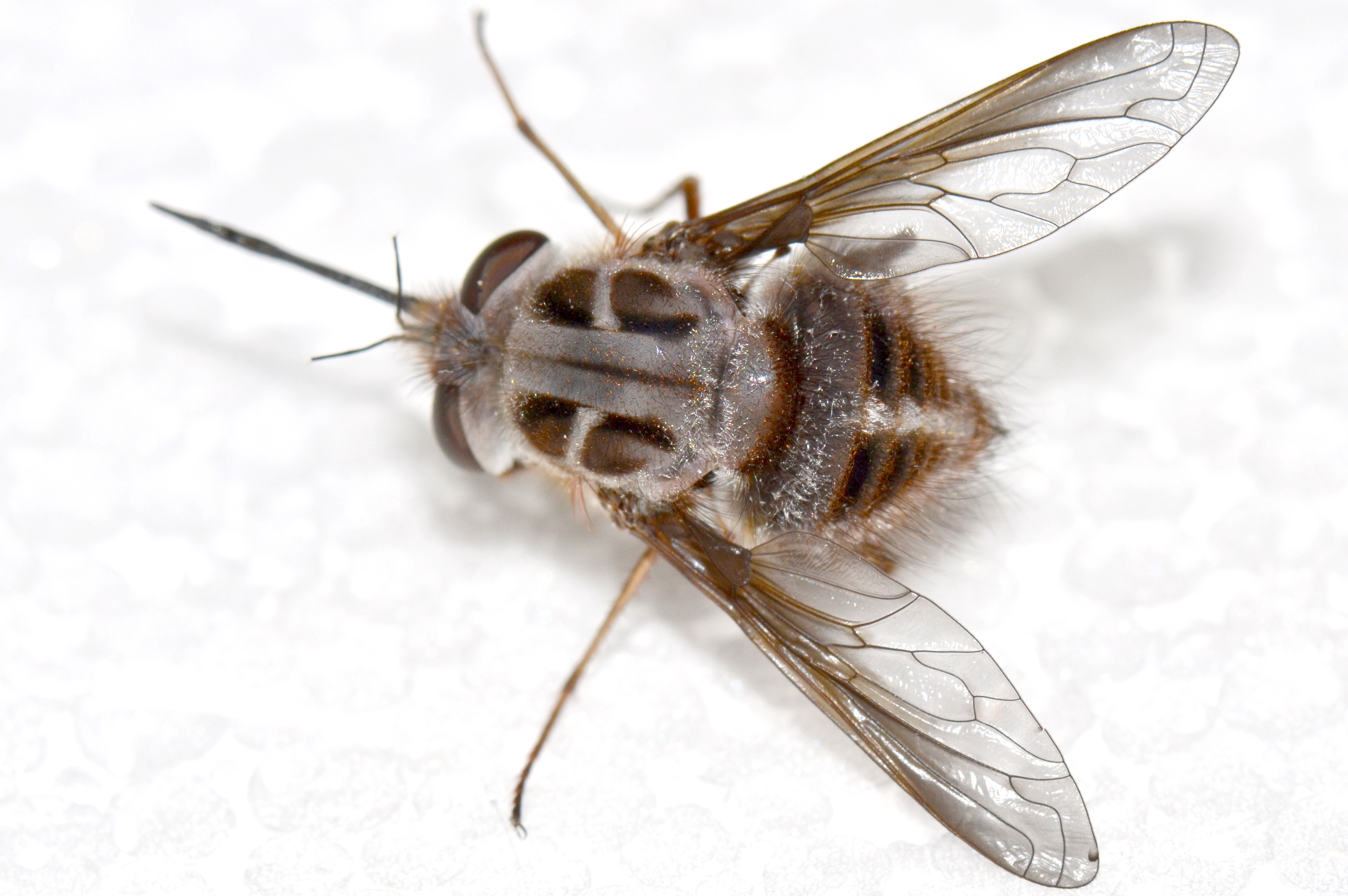

Scientific classification
- Kingdom: Animalia
- Phylum: Arthropoda
- Clade: Pancrustacea
- Class: Insecta
- Order: Diptera
- Family: Bombyliidae
- Subfamily: Bombyliinae
- Tribe: Acrophthalmydini
- Genus: Paramonovius; Li and Yeates, 2018
- Species: P. nightking

Binomial name
- Paramonovius nightking Li and Yeates, 2018

= Paramonovius =

Species of fly

Paramonovius nightking is a species of bee fly in the family Bombyliidae that is endemic to a restricted area of western Australia. It is the only member of the monotypic genus Paramonovius. Based on morphology, it is the sister genus to Sisyromyia.

This species is distinctive for its presumed activity during the winter season, which is the only period during which it has been observed. This atypical flight pattern may account for its rarity in collections. The specific epithet nightking alludes to the Night King from the American fantasy series Game of Thrones, reflecting these habits.
