= Mariobezziinae =

Scientific classification
- Domain: Eukaryota
- Kingdom: Animalia
- Phylum: Arthropoda
- Class: Insecta
- Order: Diptera
- Family: Bombyliidae
- Subfamily: Mariobezziinae; Becker

Subfamily of flies

Mariobezziinae is a subfamily of bee flies in the family Bombyliidae. There are about 10 genera and at least 50 described species in Mariobezziinae.

== Genera ==
These 10 genera belong to the subfamily Mariobezziinae:

- Callynthrophora Schiner, 1868^{c g}
- Corsomyza Wiedemann, 1820^{c g}
- Dasypalpus Macquart, 1840^{c g}
- Gnumyia Bezzi, 1921^{c g}
- Hyperusia Bezzi, 1921^{c g}
- Mariobezzia Becker, 1912^{c g}
- Megapalpus Macquart, 1834^{c g}
- Pusilla Paramonov, 1954^{c g}
- Zyxmyia Bowden, 1960^{c g}
- † Paracorsomyza Hennig, 1966

Data sources: i = ITIS, c = Catalogue of Life, g = GBIF, b = Bugguide.net
