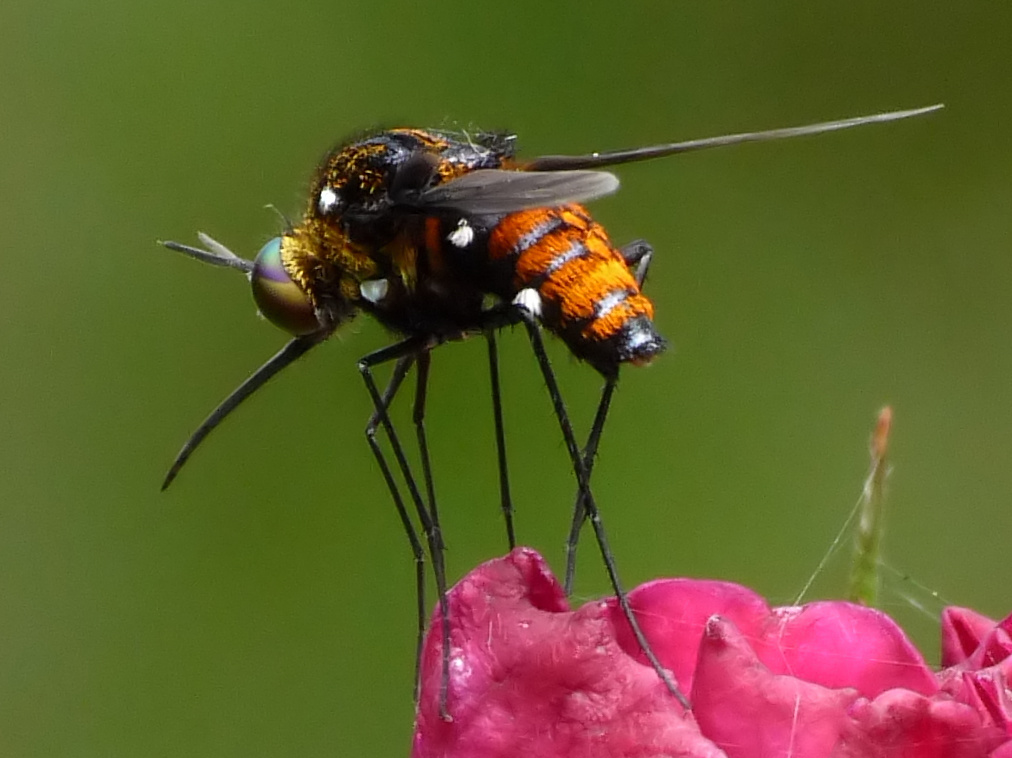
- Female
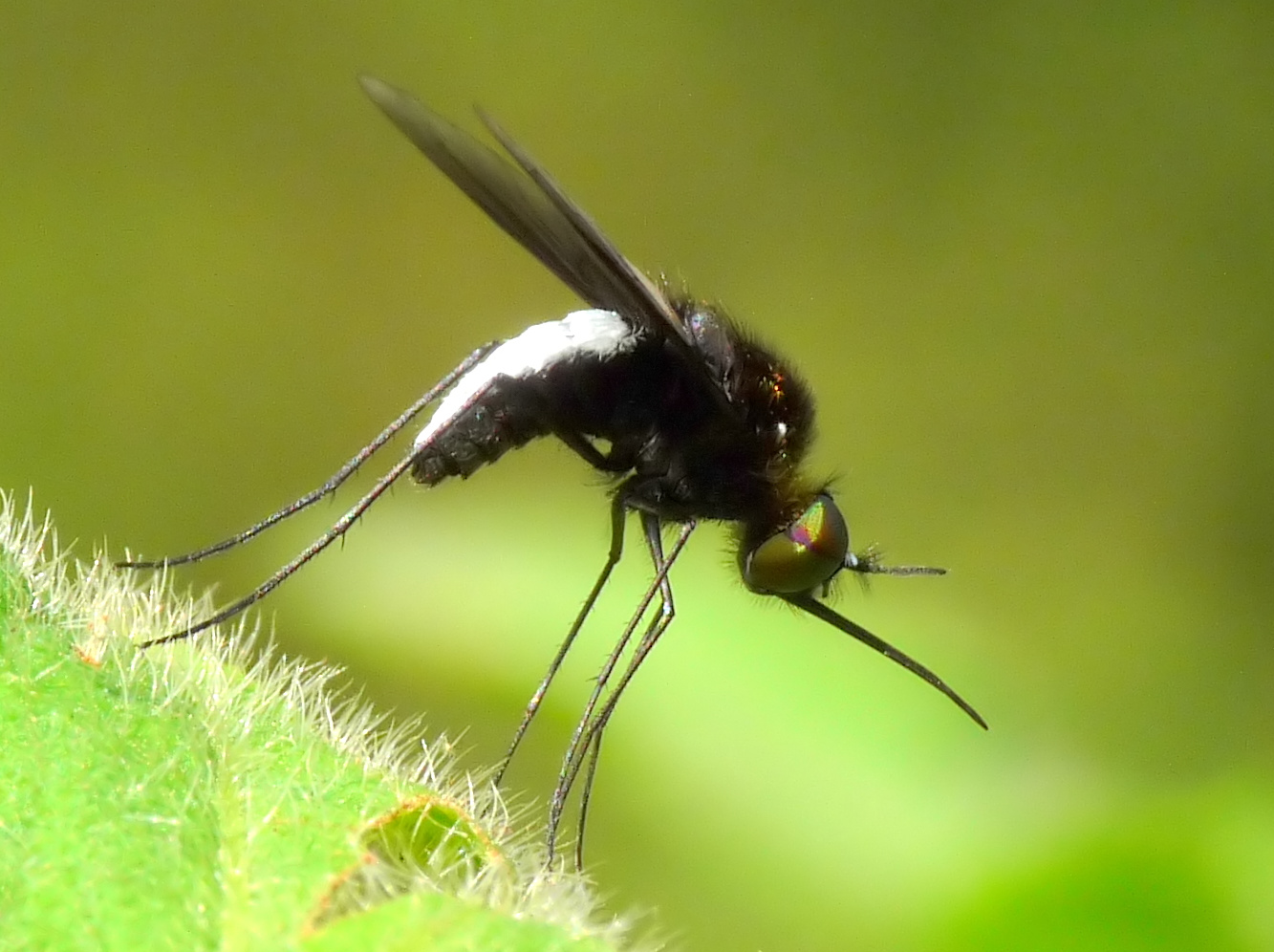
- Male

Scientific classification
- Kingdom: Animalia
- Phylum: Arthropoda
- Class: Insecta
- Order: Diptera
- Family: Bombyliidae
- Subfamily: Bombyliinae
- Tribe: Bombyliini
- Genus: Euchariomyia
- Species: E. dives

Binomial name
- Euchariomyia dives Bigot, 1888

Synonyms
- Bombylius scintillans Brunetti, 1909

= Euchariomyia =

Species of fly

Euchariomyia is a monotypic genus of the subfamily Bombyliinae. The only species is Euchariomyia dives.

== Taxonomy ==
Euchariomyia dives is described by French entomologist Jacques Marie François Bigot in 1888. This species is highly variable in appearance and earlier placed in four separate species. However, further study revealed that they are all belongs to one species.

== Distribution ==
Euchariomyia dives is mainly known from southern and eastern Asia. They are reported from Burma, China (Beijing, Guangxi, Shandong), India (Kerala, Orissa, Tamil Nadu, Uttar Pradesh), Indonesia (Java, Sumatra), Laos, Malaysia (Kelantan, Penang), Sri Lanka, Thailand, and Vietnam.

== Description ==
They are small in size (4-6 mm), head with a long proboscis, iridescent wings, and long, slender legs. There are conspicuous silvery tufts of scale-like hairs on the head, thorax, and abdomen. The legs are dark brown with short hairs. The wings are dark brown to light brown.

=== Male ===
The body length 3.5-6.0 mm and the wing length 5-7 mm. It has a black head and a face with long sparse black hairs. They have long white scales just above antennae and compound eyes are holoptic. Proboscis extend well beyond oral margin up to 8 times head length. Thorax is black and grey and the surface covered with a fine yellow dust, like pollen except pronotum. The abdomen is black and the dorsal side has dense, silvery white scales, but exhibits variation between individuals.

=== Female ===
The body length is 4-6 mm and the wing length is 5-7 mm. It has aack head, sides of antenna with long white scales and compound eyes are dichoptic. The proboscis is black and nearly three times longer than head. The abdomen of the female is black and the dorsal side has red to orange scales, showing little variation among individuals.
