= Oniromyia =

Scientific classification
- Kingdom: Animalia
- Phylum: Arthropoda
- Clade: Pancrustacea
- Class: Insecta
- Order: Diptera
- Family: Bombyliidae
- Subfamily: Oniromyiinae; Greathead, 1972
- Genus: Oniromyia; Bezzi, 1921

Genus of flies

Oniromyia is a genus of bee flies in the family Bombyliidae, the sole genus of the subfamily Oniromyiinae. There are at least two described species in Oniromyia.

== Species ==
These two species belong to the genus Oniromyia:

- Oniromyia caffrariae Hesse, 1960^{w c g}
- Oniromyia pachycerata (Bigot, 1892)^{w c g}

Data sources: w=World Catalog of Bee Flies, c=Catalogue of Life, g=GBIF
