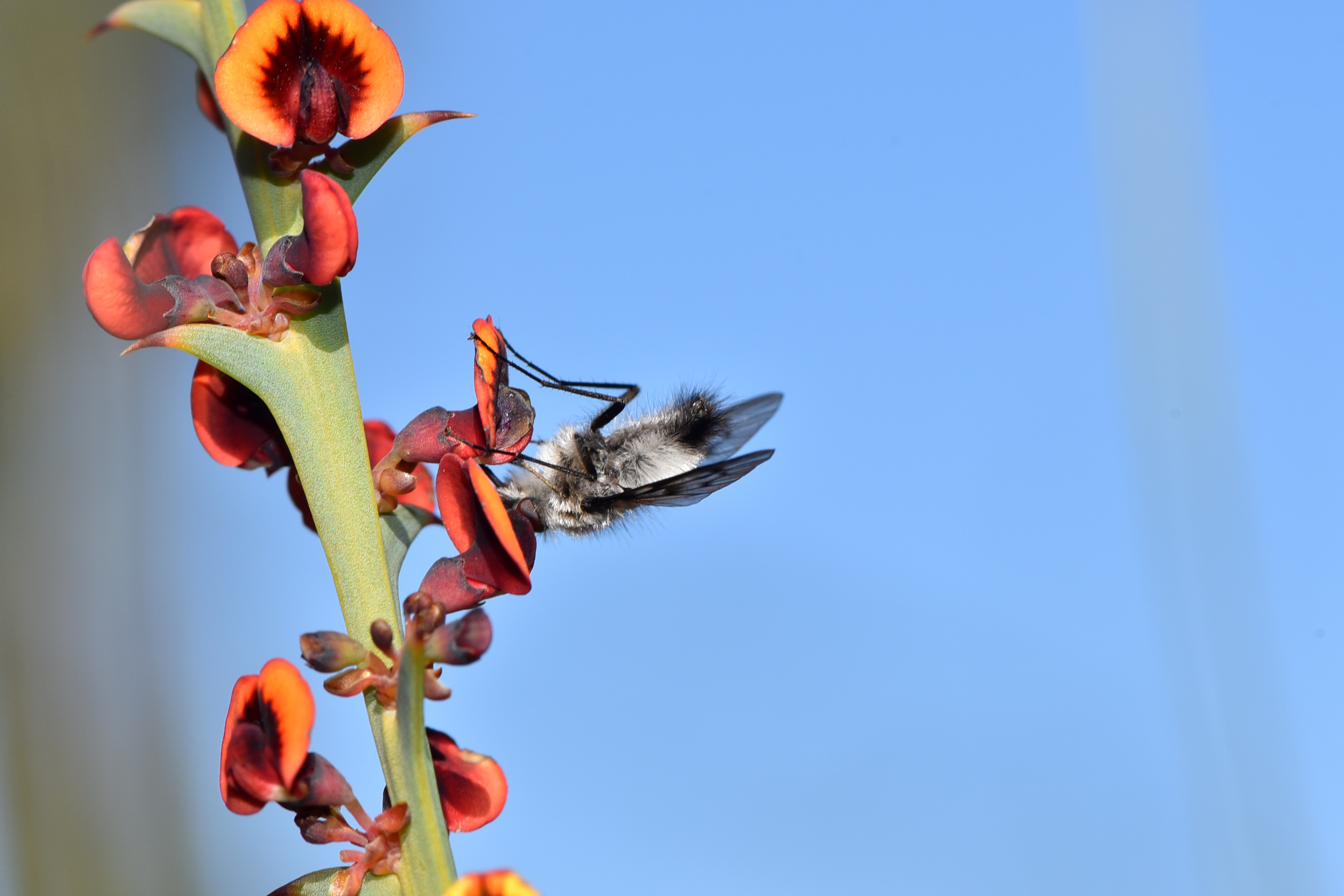
- Specimen Image

Scientific classification
- Domain: Eukaryota
- Kingdom: Animalia
- Phylum: Arthropoda
- Class: Insecta
- Order: Diptera
- Family: Bombyliidae
- Subfamily: Antoniinae; Hull, 1973

= Antoniinae =

Subfamily of flies

Antoniinae is a subfamily of bee flies in the family Bombyliidae. There are at least 4 genera and 20 described species in Antoniinae.

== Genera ==
These four genera belong to the subfamily Antoniinae:

- Antonia Loew, 1856^{c g}
- Antoniaustralia Becker, 1912^{c g}
- Cyx Evenhuis, 1993^{c g}
- Myonema Roberts, 1929^{c g}

Data sources: i = ITIS, c = Catalogue of Life, g = GBIF, b = Bugguide.net
