= Xenoprosopa =

Scientific classification
- Kingdom: Animalia
- Phylum: Arthropoda
- Class: Insecta
- Order: Diptera
- Family: Bombyliidae
- Subfamily: Xenoprosopinae
- Genus: Xenoprosopa; Hesse, 1956

Genus of flies

Xenoprosopa is a genus of bee flies in the family Bombyliidae, the sole genus of the subfamily Xenoprosopinae. The only described species in the genus is X. paradoxa Hesse, 1956.
