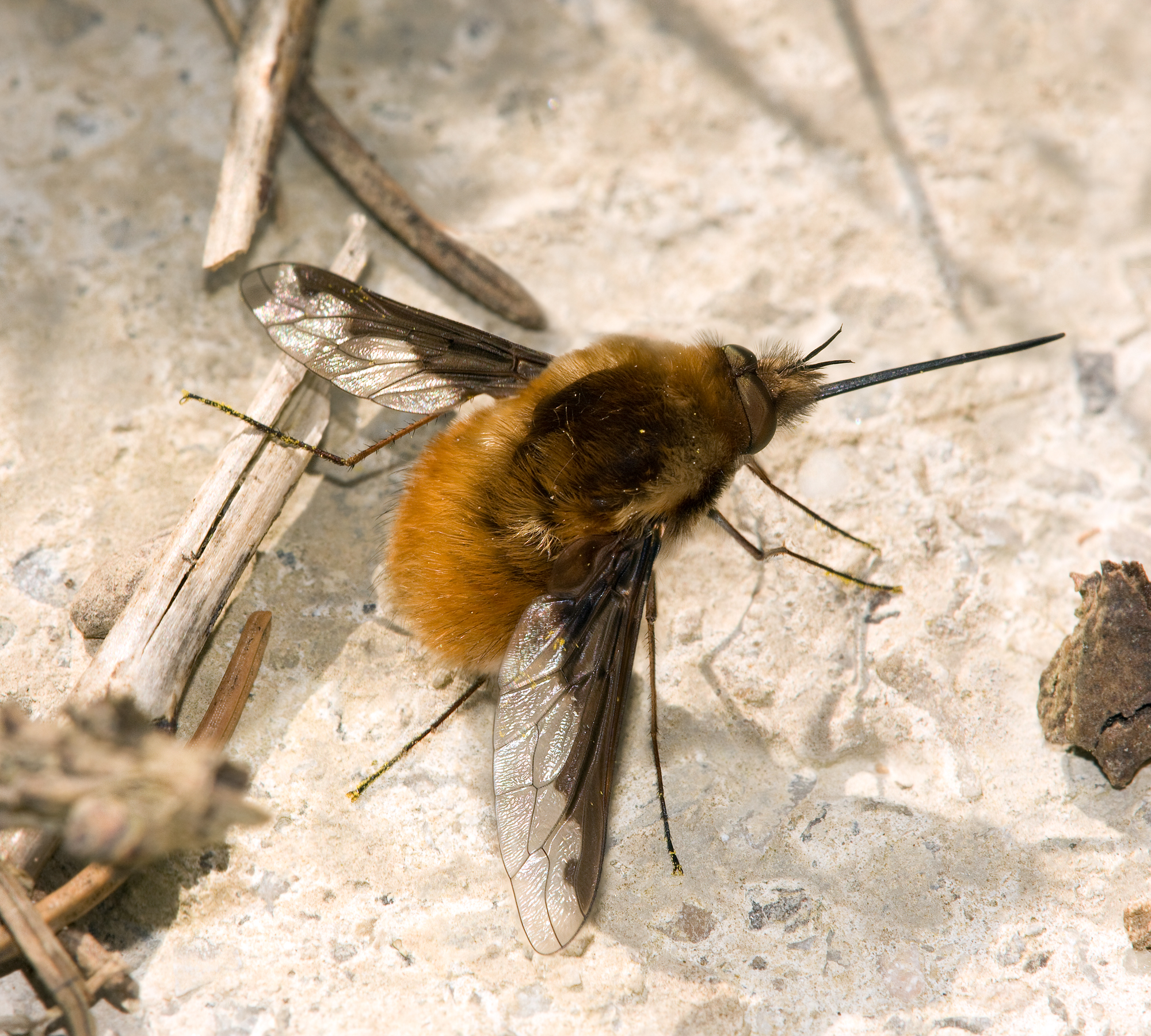
- Bombylius major

Scientific classification
- Kingdom: Animalia
- Phylum: Arthropoda
- Clade: Pancrustacea
- Class: Insecta
- Order: Diptera
- Superfamily: Asiloidea
- Family: Bombyliidae; Latreille, 1802

Subfamilies
- Anthracinae; Antoniinae; Bombyliinae; Crocidiinae; Cythereinae; Ecliminae; Heterotropinae; Lomatiinae; Mariobezziinae; Oligodraninae; Oniromyiinae; Phthiriinae; Tomomyzinae; Toxophorinae; Usiinae; Xenoprosopinae

Synonyms
- Phthiriidae; Usiidae; Systropodidae

= Bombyliidae =

Bombyliidae Temporal range: Cenomanian–Recent

Family of flies

The Bombyliidae are a family of flies, commonly known as bee flies. Some are colloquially known as bomber flies. Adults generally feed on nectar and pollen, some being important pollinators. Larvae are mostly parasitoids of other insects.

== Overview ==
The Bombyliidae are a large family of flies comprising hundreds of genera, but the life cycles of most species are not known. Their size varies between species, with a wingspan ranging from 2-40 mm long. When at rest, many species hold their wings at a characteristic "swept back" angle. Adults generally feed on nectar and pollen, some being important pollinators, often with spectacularly long proboscises adapted to plants such as Lapeirousia, a genus of flower with very long and narrow floral tubes. Unlike butterflies, bee flies hold their proboscis straight, and cannot retract it. Many Bombyliidae superficially resemble bees and accordingly the prevalent common name for a member of the family is bee fly. Possibly the resemblance is Batesian mimicry, affording the adults some protection from predators.

The larval stages are predators or parasitoids of the eggs and larvae of other insects. The adult females usually deposit eggs in the vicinity of possible hosts, quite often in the burrows of beetles, wasps, or solitary bees. Although insect parasitoids are usually fairly, often highly, host-specific, some Bombyliidae are opportunistic and will attack a variety of hosts.

The Bombyliidae include at least 4,500 described known species. However, most species do not often appear in abundance, and compared to other major groups of pollinators they are much less likely to visit flowering plants in urban parks or suburban gardens. As a result, this is arguably one of the most poorly known families of insects relative to its species richness. The family has a patchy fossil record, with species being known from a handful of localities, the oldest known species are known from the Middle Cretaceous Burmese amber, around 99 million years old.

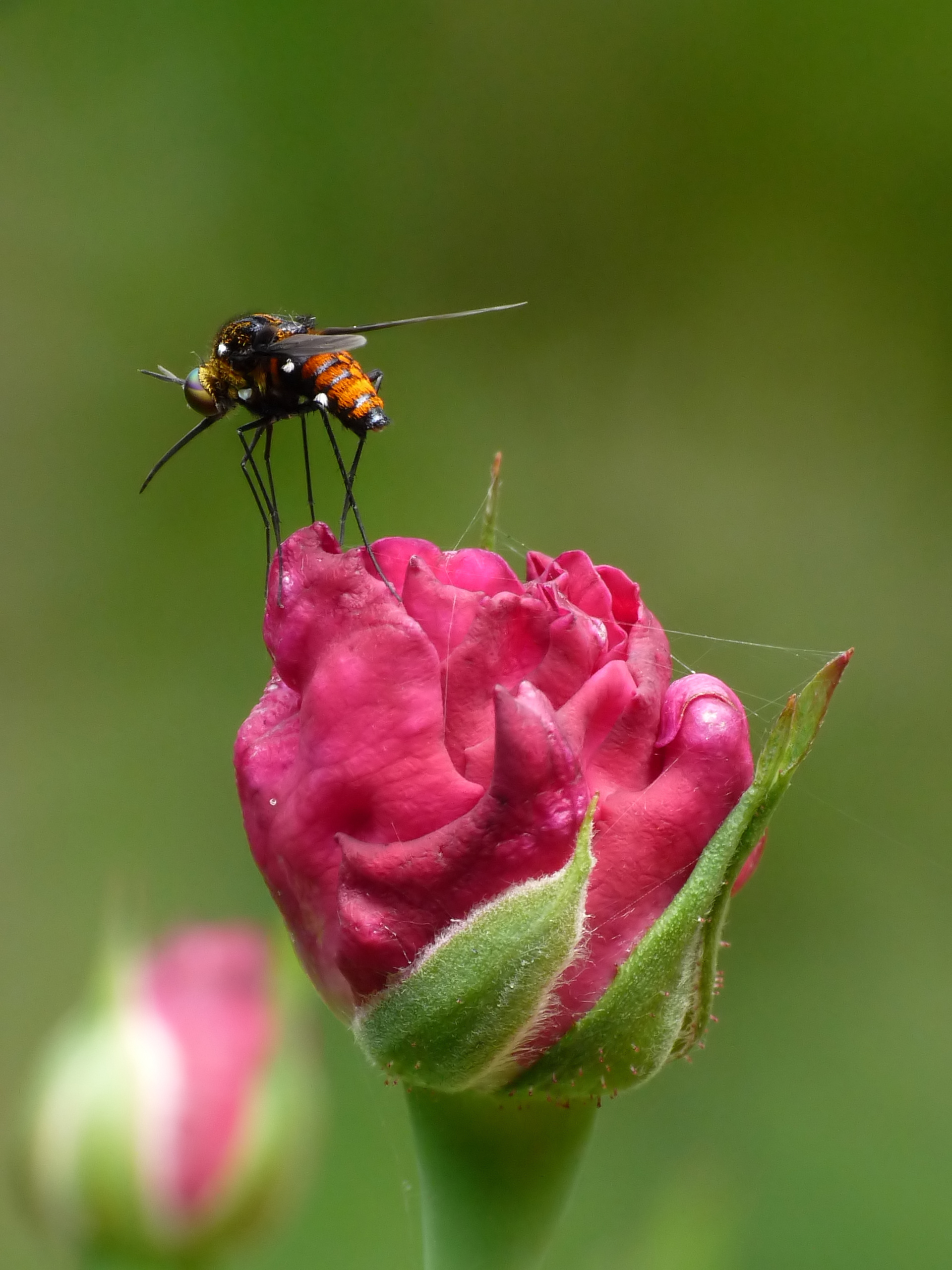
Euchariomyia dives, a Bombyliidae in India: Note the bright bands of coloured hair, the long and thin legs and upright posture, the "delta wings", the proboscis, and the forward-pointing antennae.

== Morphology ==
=== Adult ===
Although the morphology of bee flies varies in detail, adults of most bee flies are characterized by some morphological details that make recognition easy. The dimensions of the body vary, depending on the species, from 1.0 mm to 2.5 cm. The form is often compact and the integument is usually covered with dense and abundant hair. The coloration is usually inconspicuous and colours such as brown, blackish- grey, and light colors like white or yellow predominate. Many species are mimics of apoid Hymenoptera. In other species patches of flattened hairs occur that can act as silvery, gilded or copper-tone reflecting mirrors; these perhaps serve as visual signals in conspecific mate/rival recognition, or perhaps imitate reflecting surface particles on bare soils with high content of materials like quartz, mica or pyrite.

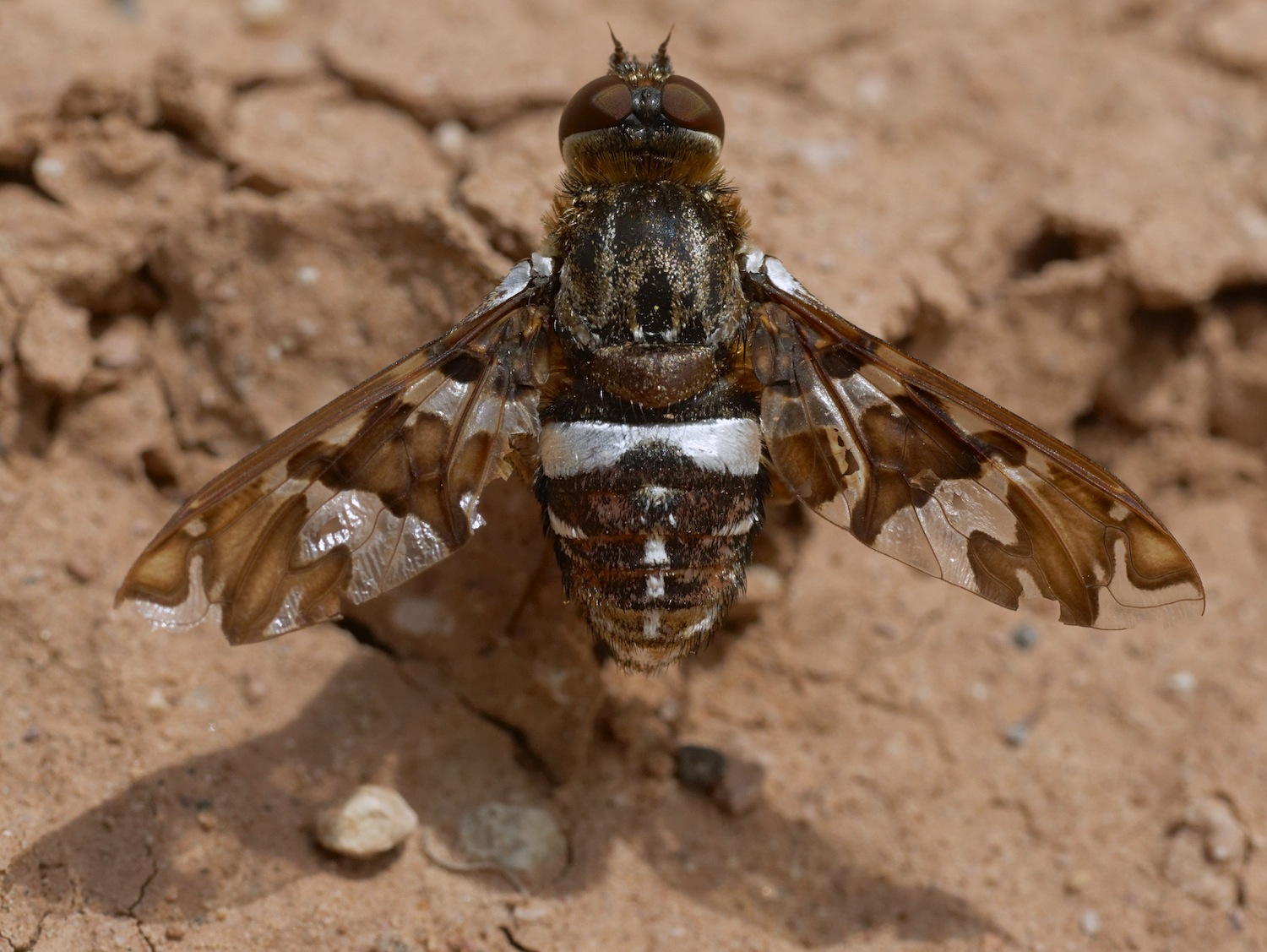
Exoprosopa caliptera in Great Sand Dunes National Park, Colorado, US - note the silvery mirror stripes formed by patches of specialized hairs modified into reflecting scales

The head is round, with a convex face, often holoptic in males. The antennae are of the type aristate composed of three to six segments, with the third segment larger than the others; the stylus is absent (antenna of three segments) or is composed of one to three flagellomeres (antenna of four to six segments). The mouthparts are modified for sucking and adapted for feeding on flowers. The length varies considerably: for example, the Anthracinae have short mouthparts, with the labium terminating in a large fleshy labellum; in Phthiriinae, the tube is considerably longer, and in Bombyliinae more than four times the length of the head.

The legs are long and thin and the front legs are sometimes smaller and more slender than the middle and rear legs. Typically, they are provided with bristles at the apex of the tibiae, without empodia and, sometimes, also without pulvilli. The wings are transparent, often hyaline or evenly colored or with bands. The alula are well developed and in the rest position the wings are kept open and horizontal in a V shape revealing the sides of the abdomen.

The abdomen is generally short and wide, subglobose-shaped, cylindrical, or conical, composed of six to eight apparent urites. The remaining urites are part of the structure of the external genitalia. The abdomen of the females often ends with spinous processes, used in ovideposition. In Anthracinae and Bombyliinae, a diverticulum is present in the eighth urite, in which the eggs are mixed with sand before being deposited.

Wing shape between species varies, with noticeable difference in shaped and venation patterns. In Bombylius, differences in the position of the veins such as CuA and A1 are found between species and also vary between the sexes. Females have slightly larger wings than males that aid in better stability during flight and enable more efficient movement, especially in feeding and laying eggs. The difference in size gives females the ability to have longer flight periods.

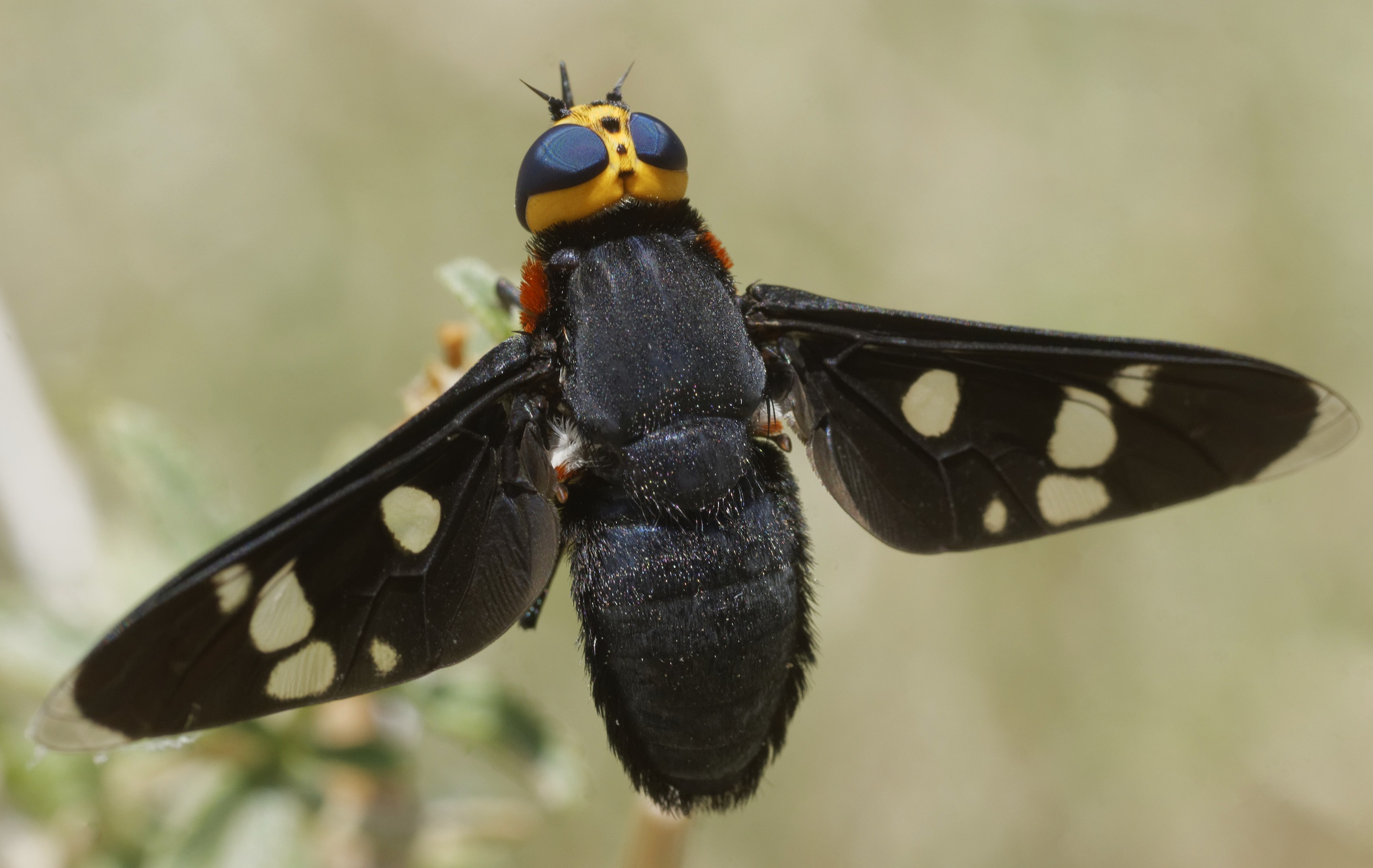
A male of Hyperalonia morio patrolling a patch of vegetation near the visitor center of Quebrada de las Higueritas in Lujan, San Luis, Argentina

The wing venation, although variable within the family, has some common characteristics that can be summarized basically in the particular morphology of the branches of the radial sector and the reduction of the forking of the media. The costa is spread over the entire margin and the subcosta is long, often ending on the distal half of the costal margin. The radius is almost always divided into four branches, with fusion of the branches R 2 and R 3, and is characterized by the sinuosity of the end portions of the branches of the radial sector. The venation presents a marked simplification compared to other Asiloidea and, in general, to other lower Brachycera. M 1 is always present and converges on the margin or, sometimes, of R 5. M 2 is present and reaches the margin, or is absent. M 3 is always absent and merged with M 4. The discal cell is usually present. The branch M 3 +4 is separated from the discal cell at the distal posterior vertex, so the mid-cubital connects directly to the posterior margin of the discal cell. The cubital and anal veins are complete and end separately on the margin or converge joining for a short distance Consequently, the cell cup may be open or closed.

Wing venation type 1 Bombylius

Wing venation type 2 Anthrax

Wing venation type 3 Usiinae

Hoverflies of the family Syrphidae often mimic Hymenoptera as well, and some syrphid species are hard to tell apart from Bombyliidae at first glance, especially for bee fly species that lack a long proboscis or long, thin legs. Such bombyliids can still be distinguished in the field by anatomical features such as:

- They usually have an evenly curved or sloping face (hoverflies often have prominent bulges of the facial cuticle and/or beak- to knob-like facial projections).
- The wings lack a "false rear edge" and often have large dark areas with sharp boundaries, or complex patterns of spots (hoverfly wings are often clear or have smooth gradients of tinting, and their veins merge posteriorly into a "false edge" rather than reaching the wing's true rear edge).
- The abdomen and thorax hardly ever have large glossy areas formed by exposed cuticle (hoverflies often have glossy cuticular body surfaces).

=== Larva ===
The larvae of most bee flies are of two types. Those of the first type are elongated and cylindrical in shape and have a metapneustic or amphipneustic tracheal system, provided with a pair of abdominal spiracles and, possibly, a thoracic pair. Those of the second type are stubby and eucephalic and have one pair of spiracles positioned in the abdomen.

== Biology ==
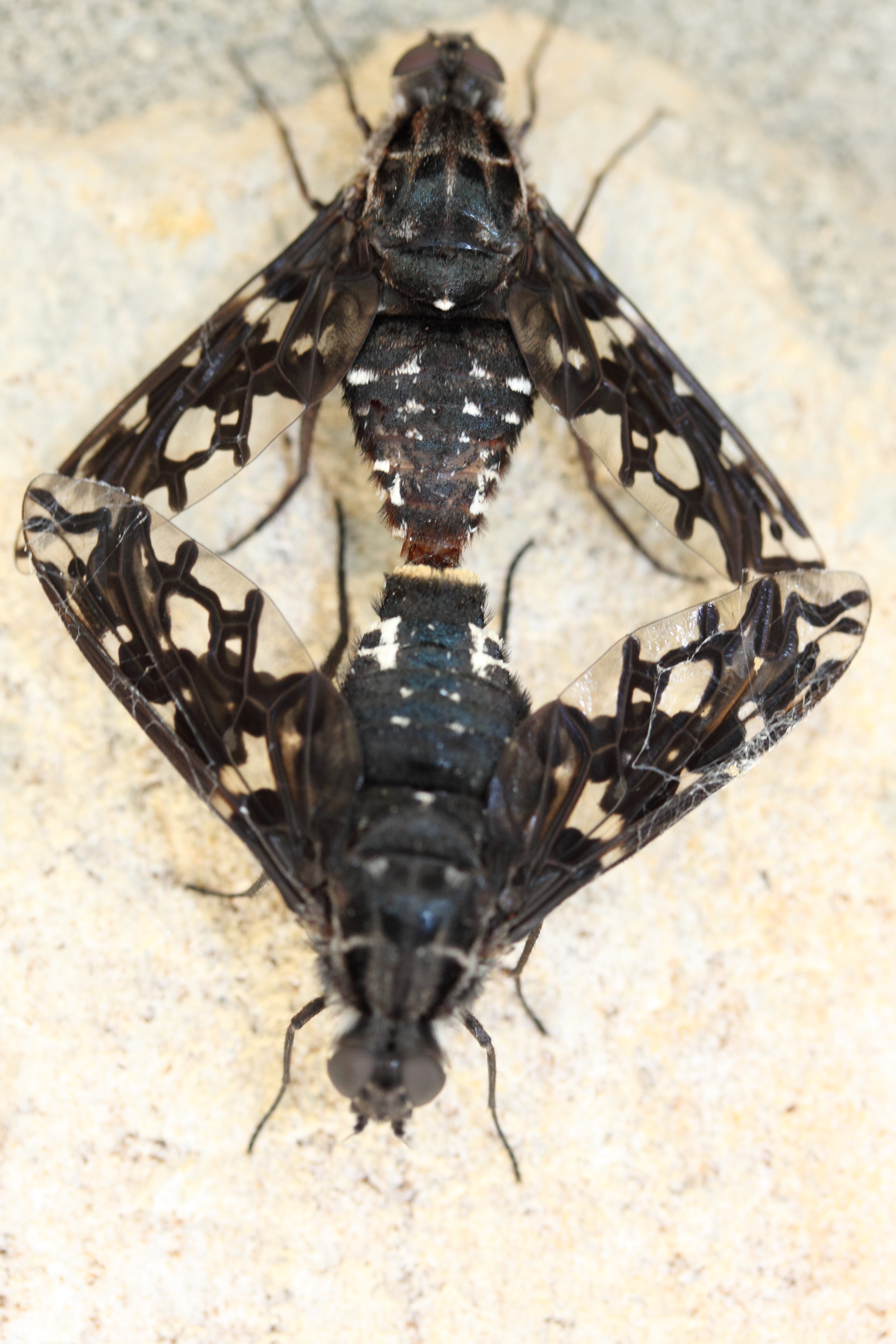
Xenox tigrinus mating

Adults favour sunny conditions and dry, often sandy or rocky areas. They have powerful wings and are found typically in flight over flowers or resting on the bare ground exposed to the sun (watch video) They significantly contribute to cross pollination of plants, becoming the main pollinators of some plant species of desert environments. Unlike the majority of nectar-feeding flies, the bee flies feed on pollen which provides essential proteins for their diet. A similar trophic behavior occurs among the hoverflies, another important family of Diptera pollinators.

=== Pollination and feeding behavior ===
As with hoverflies, bee flies are capable of sudden acceleration or deceleration, all but momentum-free high-speed changes of direction, superb control of position while hovering in mid-air, as well as a characteristically cautious approach of a possible feeding or landing site. Bombyliids are often recognizable by their stocky shapes, by their hovering behavior, and for the particular length of their mouthparts and/or legs as they lean forward into flowers. Unlike hoverflies, which settle on the flower as do bees and other pollinating insects, those bee fly species which have a long proboscis generally feed while continuing to hover in the air, rather like Sphingidae, or while touching the flower with their front legs to stabilize their position - without fully landing or ceasing oscillation of the wings.

Species with shorter proboscis do land and walk on flower heads, however, and can be much harder to distinguish from hoverflies in the field. As noted, many bee fly species spend regular time intervals at rest on or near the ground, while hoverflies hardly ever do so. It can therefore be informative to watch feeding individuals and see whether or not they move down to ground level after a few minutes. Close observation is often easier with feeding individuals than with flies on the ground, as the latter are especially quick to take flight at the first sight of moving silhouettes or approaching shadows.

=== Mating and reproduction ===
Mating behavior has only been observed in a handful of species. It can vary from fairly generic swarming or unsolicited mid-air interception, as is common in many Diptera, to courtship behavior involving a context-specific flight pattern and wingbeat pitch of the male, with or without repeated proboscis contact between male and female. Males often seek out smaller or larger clearings on the ground, presumably in vicinity of flowering plants or host nesting habitats that are likely attractive to females. They can return to their chosen perch or patch after every feeding bout or after pursuit of other insects flying over, or they can instead survey their chosen territory while hovering one or more meters above the bare patch.

This remarkable behavior has earned some species the nickname "bomber flies", and involves the female hovering steadily above the entrance to a burrow before releasing her eggs midair with a sharp flick of the abdomen. Just prior to release, each egg is coated in sand taken from a storage chamber at the tip of the abdomen, where grains had been collected earlier during ground visits. The coating has multiple methods to help increase the chance of successful parasitism. For example, the coating adds weight for better aim, protects the egg from drying out, and masking its scent from the host insect.

Gravid females seek out nesting habitats of hosts, and can spend many minutes inspecting for example entrances of smaller burrows in soil. In some species this behavior consists of hovering and repeated split-second foreleg touches of soil near the edge of the burrow's entrance, presumably to detect biochemical clues about the burrow's constructor such as identity, recency of visiting etc. If a burrow passes scrutiny then the bee fly may proceed to land and insert its posterior abdomen into the soil, laying one or more eggs at the edge or in close vicinity to it. In nine subfamilies including the more frequently observable Bombyliinae and Anthracinae, the females often do not land at all during host burrow inspections, and will proceed to release their eggs from midair by quick flicks of the abdomen while hovering over the burrow's entrance.This behavior has earned such species the colloquial name of Bomber flies. Females with this remarkable oviposition strategy typically have a ventral storage structure known as a sand chamber on the posterior end of the abdomen, which is filled with sand grains gathered before egg laying. These sand grains are used to coat each egg just before their aerial release, which is assumed to improve the female's aim as well as the egg's survival chances by adding weight, slowing down egg dehydration, masking biochemical cues that could trigger host behavior such as nest cleaning or abandonment - or a combination of all three.

Villa sp. gathering sand grains

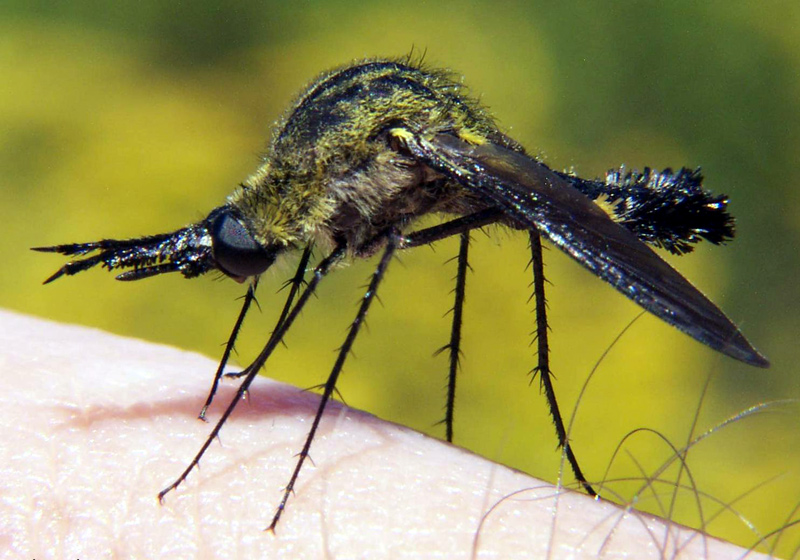
Lepidophora lepidocera, a Nearctic realm species

Despite the high number of species of this family, the biology of juveniles of most species is poorly understood. The postembryonic development is of the type hypermetamorphic, with parasitoid or hyperparasitoid larvae. Exceptions are the larvae of Heterotropinae, whose biology is similar to that of other Asiloidea, with predatory larvae that do not undergo hypermetamorphosis. Hosts of bee flies belong to different orders of insects, but mostly are among the holometabolous orders. Among these are Hymenoptera, in particular the superfamilies of Vespoidea and Apoidea, beetles, other flies, and moths. Larvae of some species including Villa sp. feed on ova of Orthoptera. Bombylius major larvae are parasitic on solitary bees including Andrena. Anthrax anale is a parasite of tiger beetle larvae, and A. trifasciata is a parasite of the wall bee. Several African species of Villa and Thyridanthrax are parasitic pupae of tsetse flies. Villa morio is parasitic on the beneficial ichneumonid species Banchus femoralis. The larvae of Dipalta are parasitic on antlions.

The behavior of known forms is similar to that of the larvae of Nemestrinoidea: the first instar larva of is a planidium while the other stages have a parasitic habitus. The eggs are laid usually in a future host or at the nest where the host develops. The planidium enters the nest and undergoes changes before starting to feed.

== Zoogeography ==
The family has a cosmopolitan distribution (Palearctic realm, Nearctic realm, Afrotropical realm, Neotropical realm, Australasian realm, Oceanian realm, Indomalayan realm), but they are most diverse in tropical and subtropical arid climates.

== Species lists ==
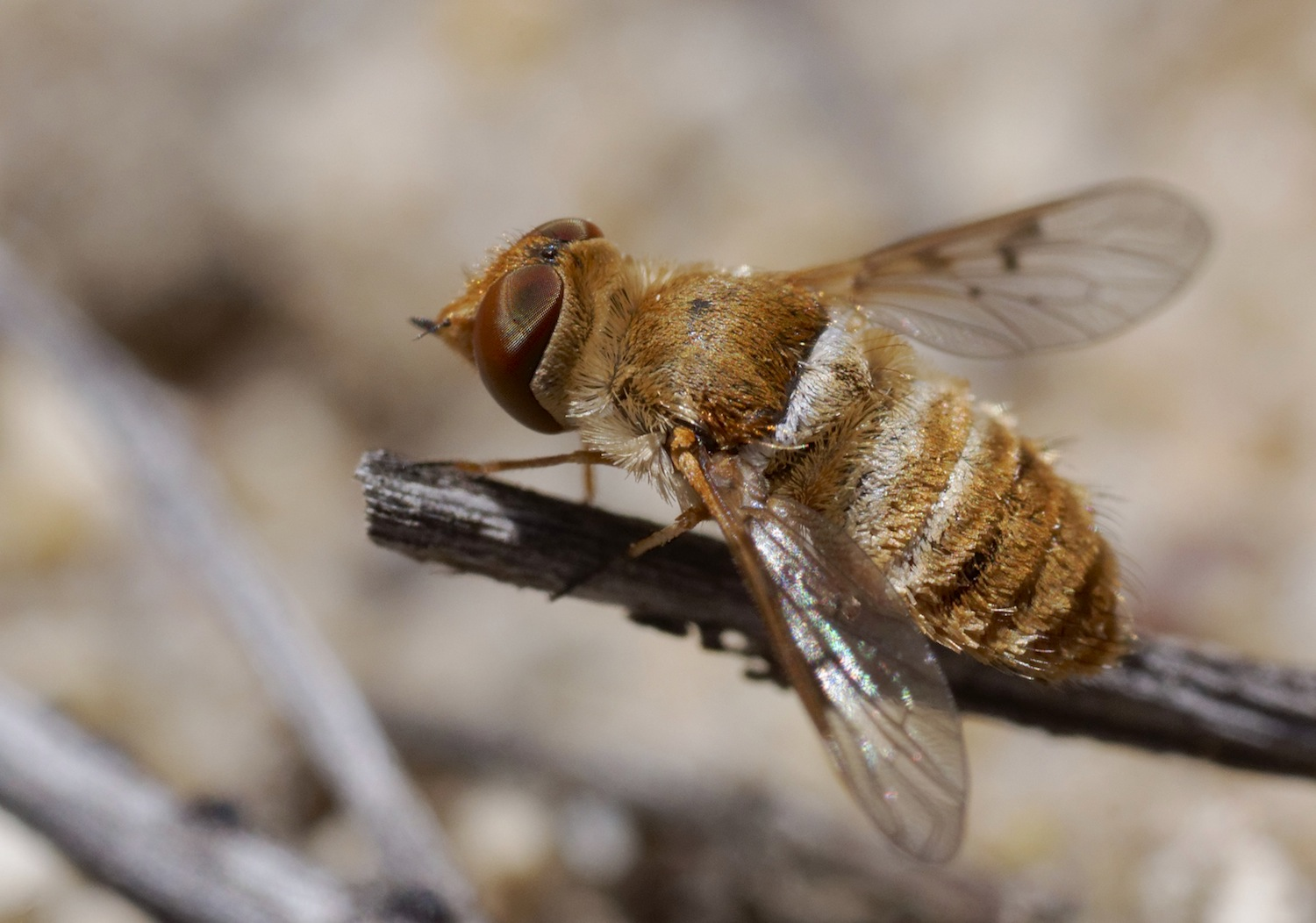
A 4 mm long female of Lepidanthrax in Cuyama Valley, California, showing the proportionally shorter wings and relatively larger head occurring in many of the smaller species in the family

- West Palaearctic including Russia
- Australasian/Oceanian
- Nearctic
- Japan
- World list

== Systematics ==
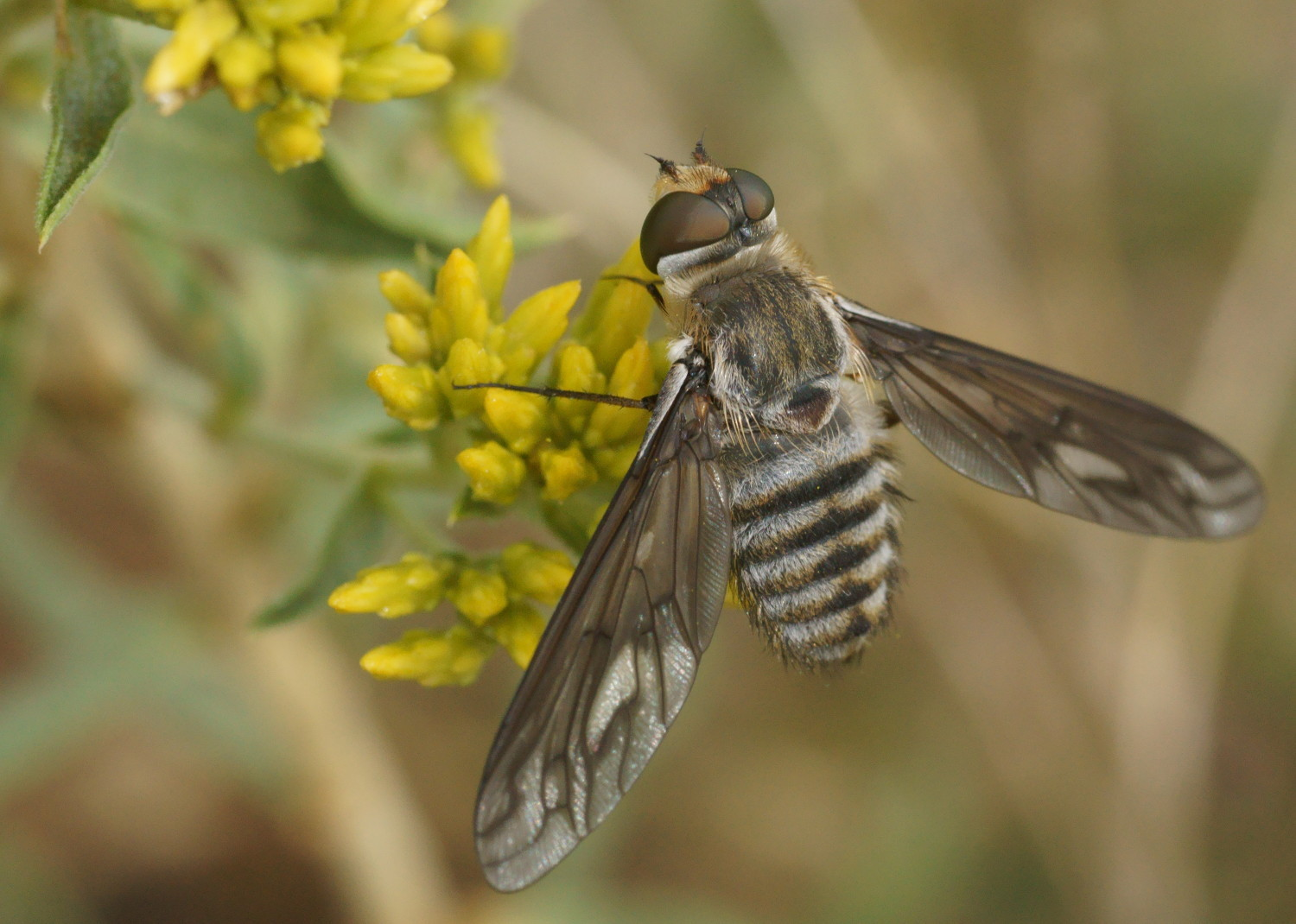
Poecilanthrax apache in Sheldon National Antelope Refuge, Nevada, US

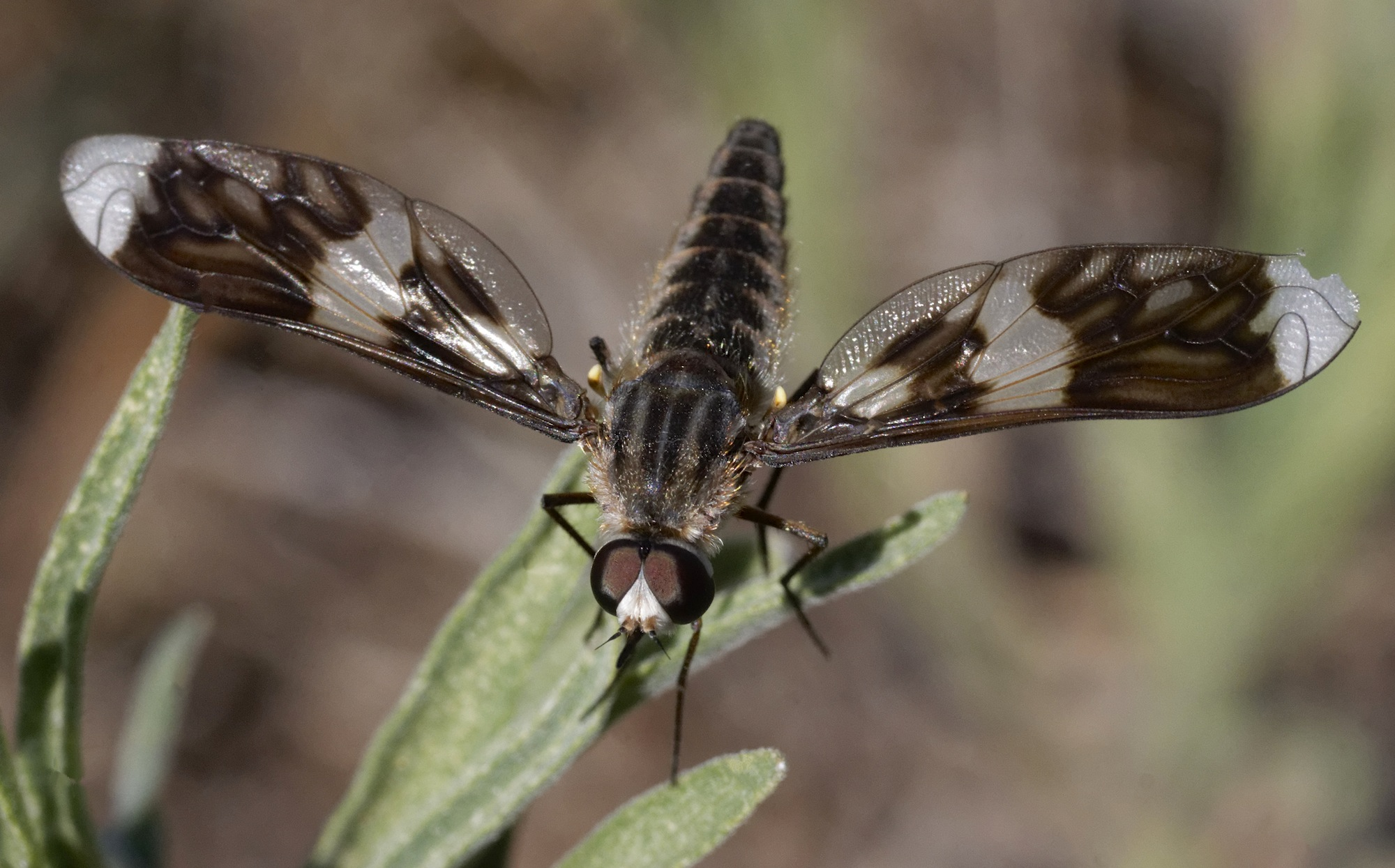
Macrocondyla chorista in a grassy border in San Luis province, Argentina, illustrating less common features for Bombyliidae such as a slender abdomen and white patches on the wings

The systematics of bee flies are the most uncertain of any family of lower Brachycera. Willi Hennig (1973) placed the bee flies in the superfamily of Nemestrinoidea, on the basis of analogies in the behaviour of the larvae, positioning the superfamily in Tabanomorpha inside the infraorder Homoeodactyla Boris Rohdendorf (1974) dealt with the family in a separate superfamily (Bombyliidea), linking it to the superfamily of Asilidea. Currently the close correlation either positions the bee-flies within the superfamily Asiloidea sensu Rohdendorf (Asilidea) or they are included with the families separated by Rohdendorf in the superfamily of Asiloidea.

Clade showing relationships within Asiloidea
- Asiloidea
  - N.N.
    - ? Scenopinidae and Therevidae
    - ? Mydidae and Apioceridae
    - ? Asilidae
  - Bombyliidae

The internal systematic of bee-flies is uncertain. In the past, 31 subfamilies were well defined, but the family is thought to be polyphyletic (sensu lato). In the 1980s and '90s, the family has undergone several revisions: Webb (1981) finally moved the genus Hilarimorpha into their own family (Hilarimorphidae). Zaitzev (1991) moved the genus Mythicomyia and several other minor genera in the family Mythicomyiidae, Yeates (1992, 1994) shifted the entire subfamily of Proratinae, with the exception of Apystomyia, into the family of Scenopinidae and subsequently the genus Apystomyia into the family Hilarimorphidae. Nagatomi & Liu (1994) moved Apystomyia into a family of their own (Apystomyiidae. After these revisions, the bee flies sensu stricto have a greater morphological homogeneity, but the monophyly of the family still remains dubious. Phylogenetic analysis of CAD and 28S rDNA gene sequences supports monophyly of only eight subfamilies out of fifteen included in the study, with the Bombyliinae resolving as a highly polyphyletic group.

Overall, the family includes about 4700 described species, distributed among 270 genera. The internal arrangement varies according to the source, according to the different frameworks the authors attribute to tribes and subfamilies. To divide the family, often this scheme is used:

- Anthracinae
  - Anthracini
  - Aphoebantini
  - Exoprosopini
  - Prorostomatini
  - Villini
  - Xeramoebini
- Antoniinae
- Bombyliinae
  - Acrophthalmydini
  - Bombyliini
  - Conophorini
- Crocidiinae
- Cythereinae
- Ecliminae
- Heterotropinae
- Lomatiinae
  - Lomatiini
  - Peringueyimyiini
- Mariobezziinae
- Oligodraninae
- Oniromyiinae
- Phthiriinae
  - Phthiriini
  - Poecilognathini
- Tomomyzinae
- Toxophorinae
  - Gerontini
  - Systropodini
  - Toxophorini
- Usiinae
  - Apolysini
  - Usiini
- Xenoprosopinae

== Genera ==
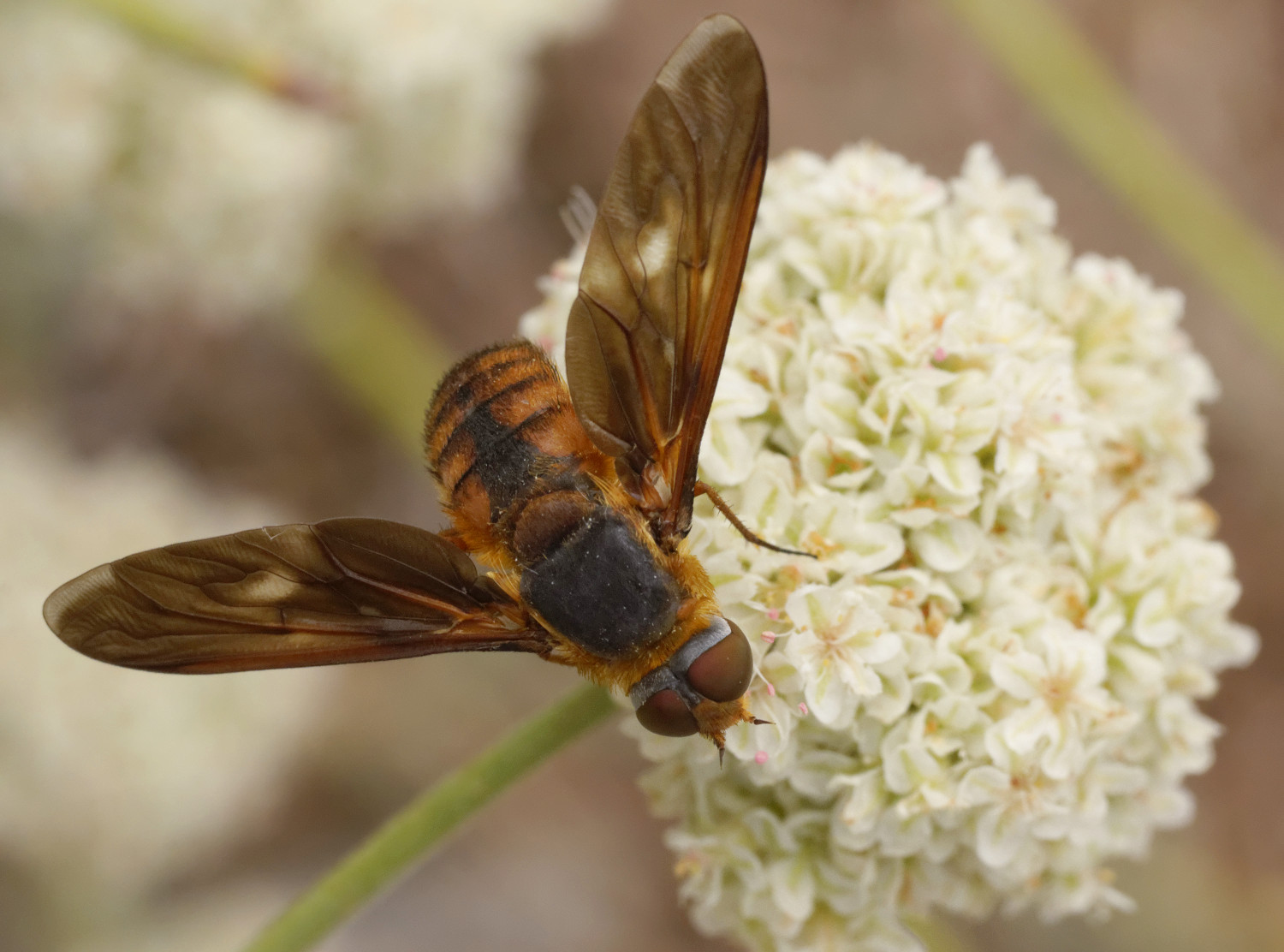
Poecilanthrax eremicus nectaring on California Buckwheat near the visitor center of Devil's Punchbowl, Pearblossom, California

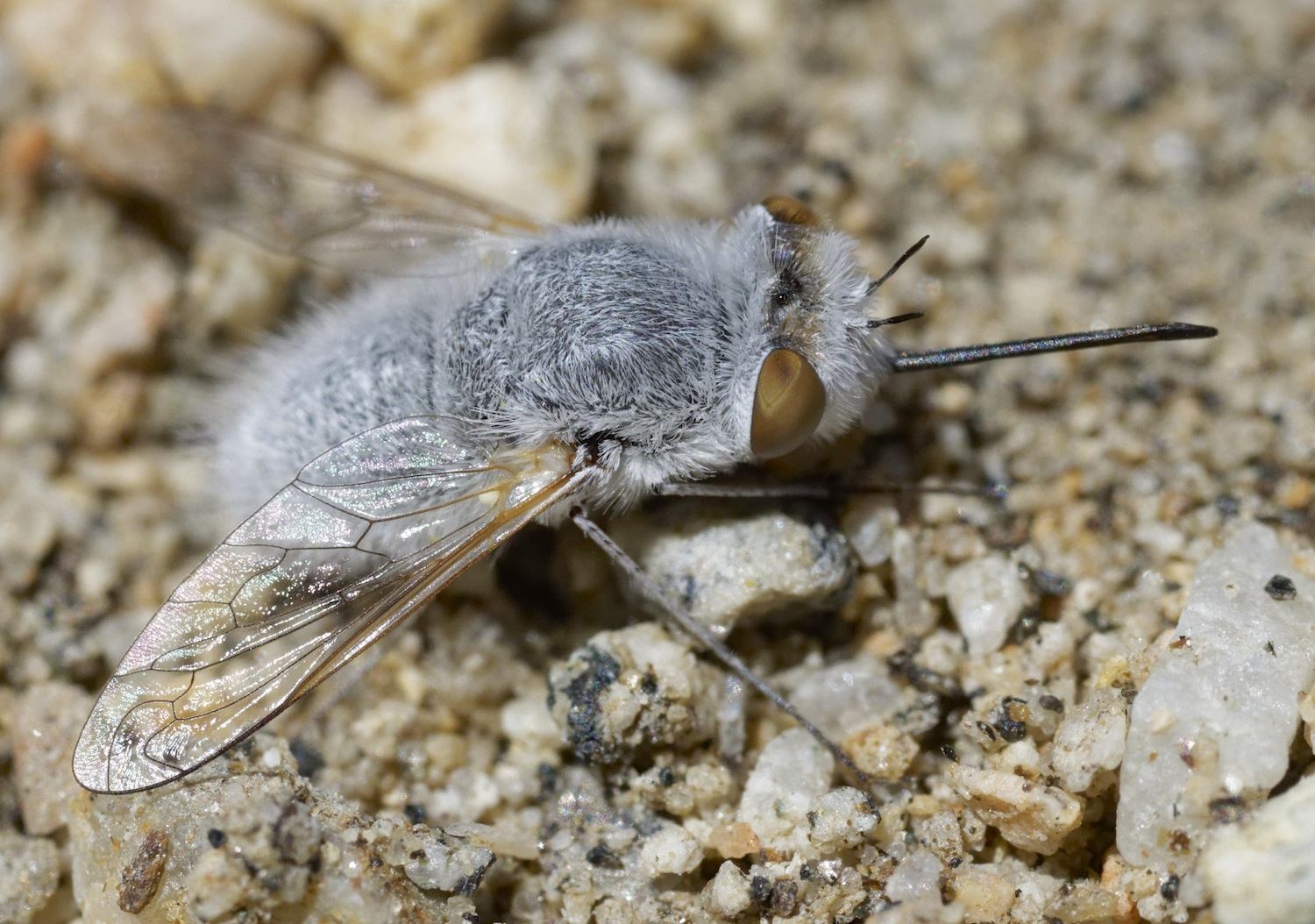
Pantarbes capito sunning in a dry wash in San Bernardino Mountains, California

- Acanthogeron Bezzi, 1925
- Acreophthiria Evenhuis, 1986
- Acreotrichus Macquart, 1840
- Acrophthalmyda Bigot, 1858
- Adelidea Macquart, 1840
- Adelogenys Hesse, 1938
- Aldrichia Coquillett, 1894
- Alepidophora Cockerell, 1909
- Aleucosia Edwards, 1934
- Alomatia Cockerell, 1914
- Amictites Hennig, 1966
- Amictus Wiedemann, 1817
- Amphicosmus Coquillett, 1891
- Anastoechus Osten Sacken, 1877
- Anisotamia Macquart, 1840
- Anthrax Scopoli, 1763
- Antonia Loew, 1856
- Antoniaustralia Becker, 1913
- Apatomyza Wiedemann, 1820
- Aphoebantus Loew, 1872
- Apolysis Loew, 1860
- Astrophanes Osten Sacken, 1877
- Atrichochira Hesse, 1956
- Australiphthiria Evenhuis, 1986
- Australoechus Greathead, 1995
- Balaana Lambkin & Yeates, 2003
- Beckerellus Greathead, 1995
- Bombomyia Greathead, 1995
- Bombylella Greathead, 1995
- Bombylisoma Rondani, 1856
- Bombylius Linnaeus, 1758, 1758
- Brachyanax Evenhuis, 1981
- Brachydemia Hull, 1973
- Bromoglycis Hull, 1971
- Brychosoma Hull, 1973
- Bryodemina Hull, 1973
- Cacoplox Hull, 1970
- Caecanthrax Greathead, 1981
- Callostoma Macquart, 1840
- Callynthrophora Schiner, 1868
- Canariellum Strand, 1928
- Chalcochiton Loew, 1844
- Choristus Walker, 1852
- Chrysanthrax Osten Sacken, 1886
- Colossoptera Hull, 1973
- Comptosia Macquart, 1840
- Conomyza Hesse, 1956
- Cononedys Hermann, 1907
- Conophorina Becker, 1920
- Conophorus Meigen, 1803
- Corsomyza Wiedemann, 1820
- Coryprosopa Hesse, 1956
- Crocidium Loew, 1860
- Cryomyia Hull, 1973
- Cyananthrax Painter, 1959
- Cyllenia Latreille, 1802
- Cyrtomyia Bigot, 1892
- Cytherea Fabricius, 1794
- Cyx Evenhuis, 1993
- Dasypalpus Macquart, 1840
- Desmatomyia Williston, 1895
- Desmatoneura Williston, 1895
- Deusopora Hull, 1971
- Diatropomma Bowden, 1962
- Dicranoclista Bezzi, 1924
- Diochanthrax Hall, 1975
- Dipalta Osten Sacken, 1877
- Diplocampta Schiner, 1868
- Dischistus Loew, 1855
- Docidomyia White, 1916
- Doddosia Edwards, 1934
- Dolichomyia Wiedemann, 1830
- Doliogethys Hesse, 1938
- Eclimus Loew, 1844
- Edmundiella Becker, 1915
- Efflatounia Bezzi, 1925
- Enica Macquart, 1834
- Epacmoides Hesse, 1956
- Epacmus Osten Sacken, 1886
- Eremyia Greathead, 1996\
- Eristalopsis Evenhuis, 1985
- Eucessia Coquillett, 1886
- Euchariomyia Bigot, 1888
- Euprepina Hull, 1971
- Eurycarenus Loew, 1860
- Euryphthiria Evenhuis, 1986
- Eusurbus Roberts, 1929
- Exechohypopion Evenhuis, 1991
- Exepacmus Coquillett, 1894
- Exhyalanthrax Becker, 1916
- Exoprosopa Macquart, 1840
- Geminaria Coquillett, 1894
- Geron Meigen, 1820
- Glaesamictus Hennig, 1966
- Gnumyia Bezzi, 1921
- Gonarthrus Bezzi, 1921
- Gyrocraspedum Becker, 1913
- Hallidia Hull, 1970
- Hemipenthes Loew, 1869
- Heteralonia Rondani, 1863
- Heterostylum Macquart, 1848
- Heterotropus Loew, 1873
- Hyperalonia Rondani, 1863
- Hyperusia Bezzi, 1921
- Inyo Hall & Evenhuis, 1987
- Isocnemus Bezzi, 1924
- Kapu Lambkin & Yeates, 2003
- Karakumia Paramonov, 1927
- Laminanthrax Greathead, 1967
- Larrpana Lambkin & Yeates, 2003
- Laurella Hull, 1971
- Legnotomyia Bezzi, 1902
- Lepidanthrax Osten Sacken, 1886
- Lepidochlanus Hesse, 1938
- Lepidophora Westwood, 1835
- Ligyra Newman, 1841
- Litorhina Bowden, 1975
- Lomatia Meigen, 1822
- Lordotus Loew, 1863
- Macrocondyla Rondani, 1863
- Mallophthiria Edwards, 1930
- Mancia Coquillett, 1886
- Mandella Evenhuis, 1983
- Mariobezzia Becker, 1913
- Marleyimyia Hesse, 1956
- Marmosoma White, 1916
- Megapalpus Macquart, 1834
- Megaphthiria Hall, 1976
- Melanderella Cockerell, 1909
- Meomyia Evenhuis, 1983
- Metacosmus Coquillett, 1891
- Micomitra Bowden, 1964
- Munjua Lambkin & Yeates, 2003
- Muscatheres Evenhuis, 1986
- Muwarna Lambkin & Yeates, 2003
- Myonema Roberts, 1929
- Neacreotrichus Cockerell, 1917
- Nectaropota Philippi, 1865
- Neobombylodes Evenhuis, 1978
- Neodiplocampta Curran, 1934
- Neodischistus Painter, 1933
- Neosardus Roberts, 1929
- Nomalonia Rondani, 1863
- Nothoschistus Bowden, 1985
- Notolomatia Greathead, 1998
- Oestranthrax Bezzi, 1921
- Oestrimyza Hull, 1973
- Ogcodocera Macquart, 1840
- Oligodranes Loew, 1844
- Oncodosia Edwards, 1937
- Oniromyia Bezzi, 1921
- Othniomyia Hesse, 1938
- Pachyanthrax François, 1964
- Pachysystropus Cockerell, 1909
- Palaeoamictus Meunier, 1916
- Palaeogeron Meunier, 1915
- Palintonus François, 1964
- Palirika Lambkin & Yeates, 2003
- Pantarbes Osten Sacken, 1877
- Pantostomus Bezzi, 1921
- Paracorsomyza Hennig, 1966
- Paradiplocampta Hall, 1975
- Parachistus Greathead, 1980
- Paracosmus Osten Sacken, 1877
- Parageron Paramonov, 1929
- Paramonovius Li & Yeates, 2018
- Paranthrax Bigot, 1876
- Parasysteochus Hall, 1976
- Paratoxophora Engel, 1936
- Paravilla Painter, 1933
- Parisus Walker, 1852
- Perengueyimyia Bigot, 1886
- Petrorossia Bezzi, 1908
- Phthiria Meigen, 1803
- Pilosia Hull, 1973
- Pipunculopsis Bezzi, 1925
- Platamomyia Brèthes, 1925
- Plesiocera Macquart, 1840
- Poecilanthrax Osten Sacken, 1886
- Poecilognathus Jaennicke, 1867
- Praecytherea Théobald, 1937
- Prorachthes Loew, 1868
- Prorostoma Hesse, 1956
- Prothaplocnemis Bezzi, 1925
- Pseudopenthes Roberts, 1928
- Pteraulacodes Hesse, 1956
- Pteraulax Bezzi, 1921
- Pterobates Bezzi, 1921
- Pusilla Paramonov, 1954
- Pygocona Hull, 1973
- Relictiphthiria Evenhuis, 1986
- Rhynchanthrax Painter, 1933
- Satyramoeba Sack, 1909
- Semiramis Becker, 1913
- Semistoechus Hall, 1976
- Sericosoma Macquart, 1850
- Sericothrix Hall, 1976
- Sericusia Edwards, 1937
- Sinaia Becker, 1916
- Sisyromyia White, 1916
- Sisyrophanus Karsch, 1886
- Sosiomyia Bezzi, 1921
- Sparnopolius Loew, 1855
- Sphenoidoptera Williston, 1901
- Spogostylum Macquart, 1840
- Staurostichus Hull, 1973
- Stomylomyia Bigot, 1888
- Stonyx Osten Sacken, 1886
- Synthesia Bezzi, 1921
- Systoechus Loew, 1855
- Systropus Wiedemann, 1820
- Thevenetimyia Bigot, 1875
- Thraxan Yeates & Lambkin, 1998
- Thyridanthrax Osten Sacken, 1886
- Tillyardomyia Tonnoir, 1927
- Timiomyia Evenhuis, 1978
- Tithonomyia Evenhuis, 1984
- Tmemophlebia Evenhuis, 1986
- Tomomyza Wiedemann, 1820
- Tovlinius Zaitzev, 1979
- Toxophora Meigen, 1803
- Triplasius Loew, 1855
- Triploechus Edwards, 1937
- Turkmeniella Paramonov, 1940
- Usia Latreille, 1802
- Veribubo Evenhuis, 1978
- Verrallites Cockerell, 1913
- Villa Lioy, 1864
- Villoestrus Paramonov, 1931
- Walkeromyia Paramonov, 1934
- Wurda Lambkin & Yeates, 2003
- Xenoprosopa Hesse, 1956
- Xenox Evenhuis, 1984
- Xerachistus Greathead, 1995
- Xeramoeba Hesse, 1956
- Ylasoia Speiser, 1920
- Zaclava Hull, 1973
- Zinnomyia Hesse, 1955
- Zyxmyia Bowden, 1960

== Gallery ==
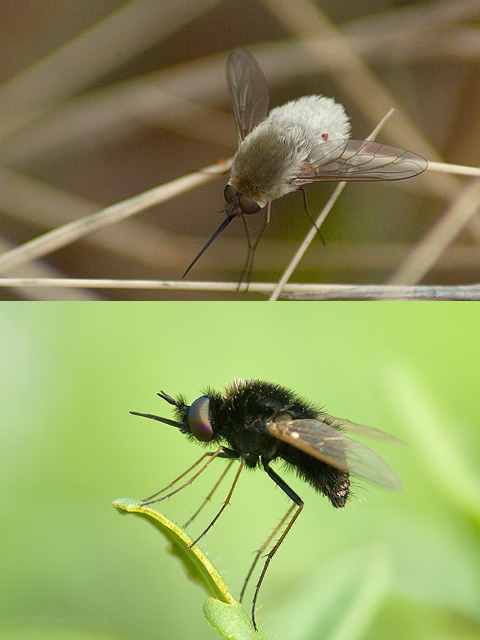
Two species of unidentified bee flies from Coimbatore, Tamil Nadu, India.

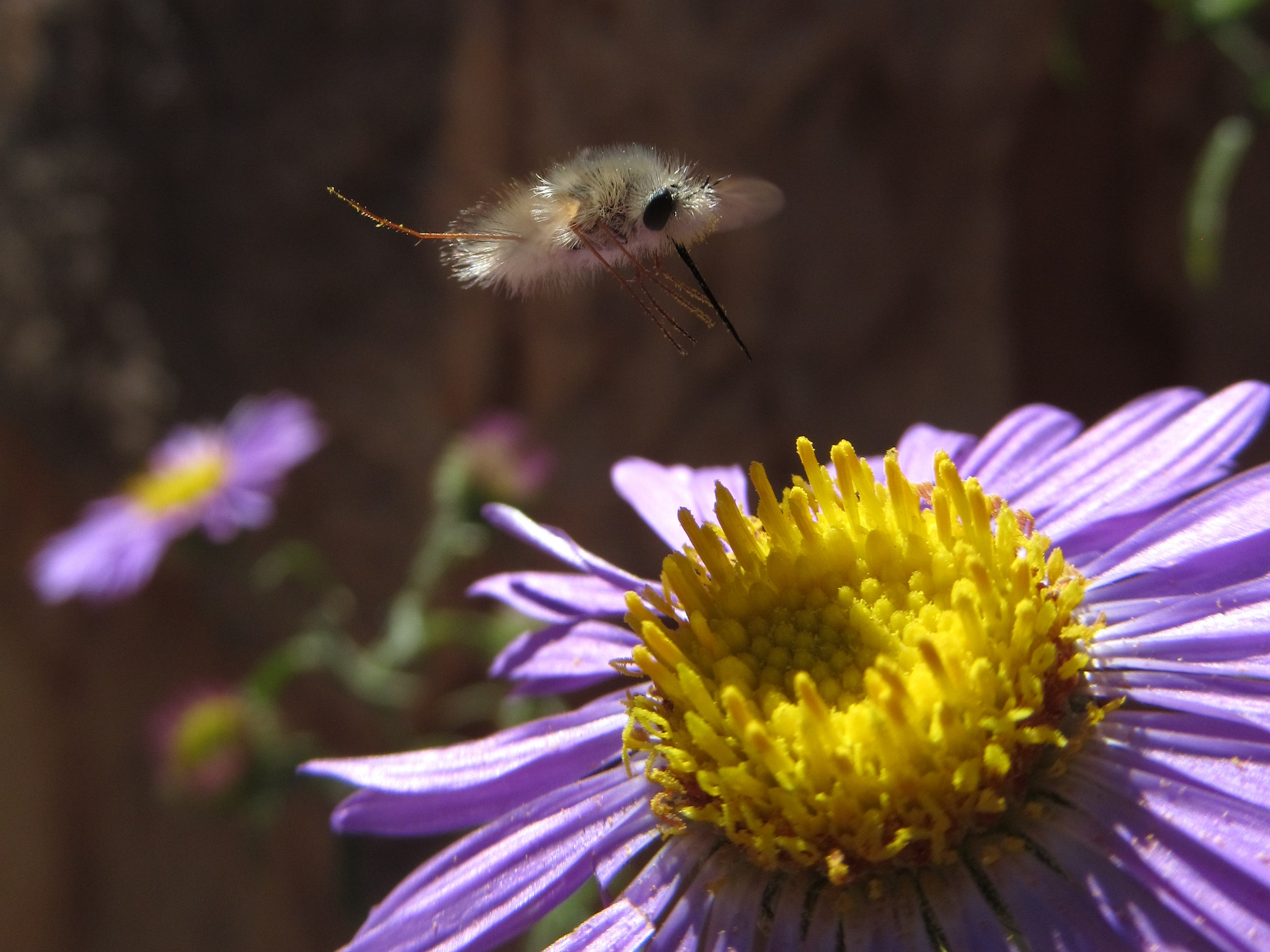
A bombyliid fly visiting a flower.

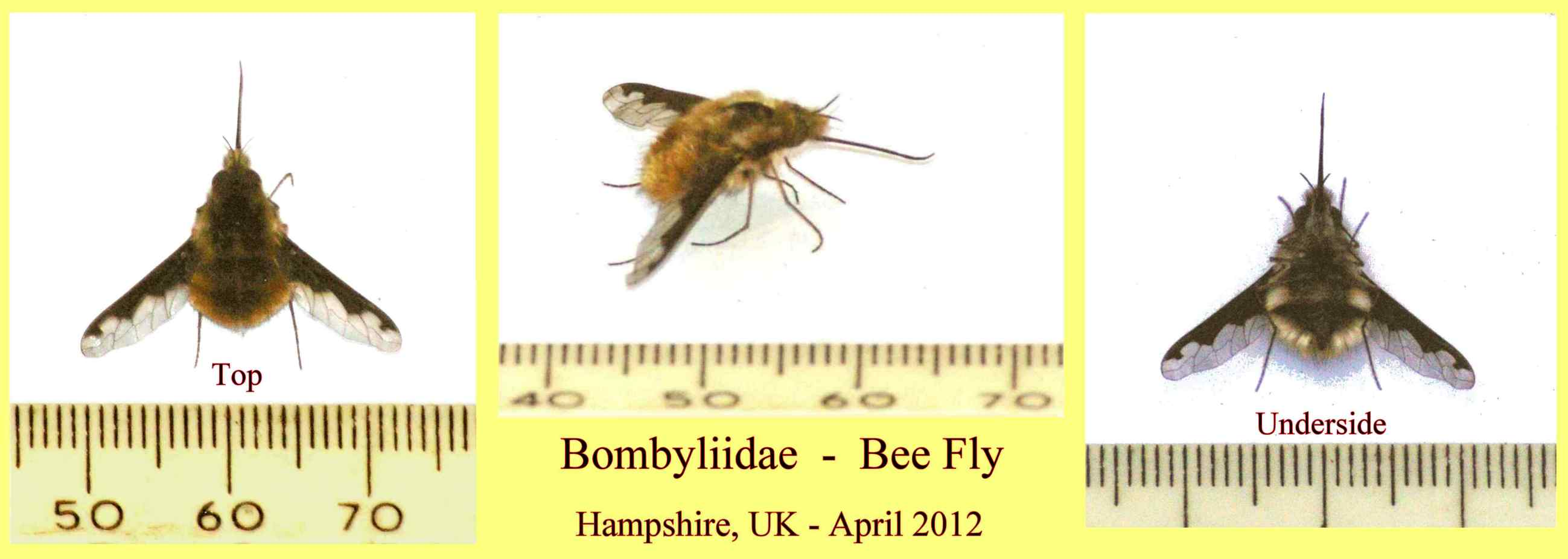
Bee fly in Hampshire, United Kingdom conservatory .

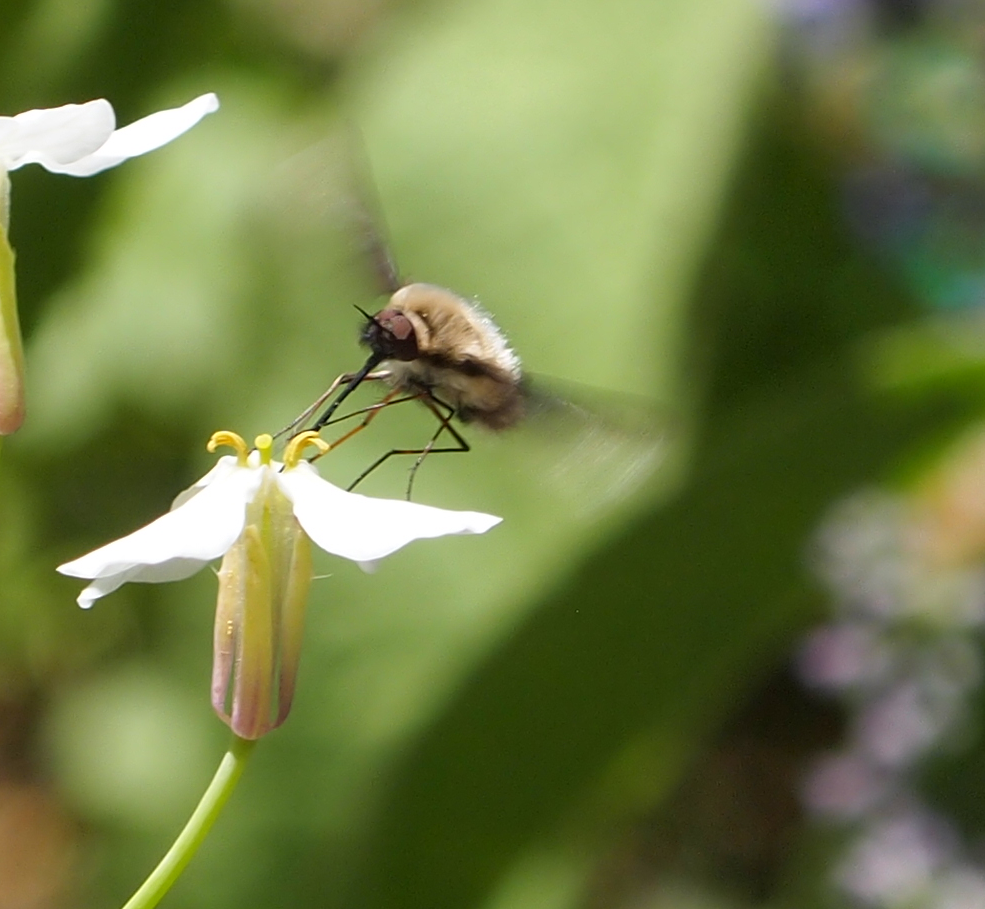
Bee fly landing on a flower

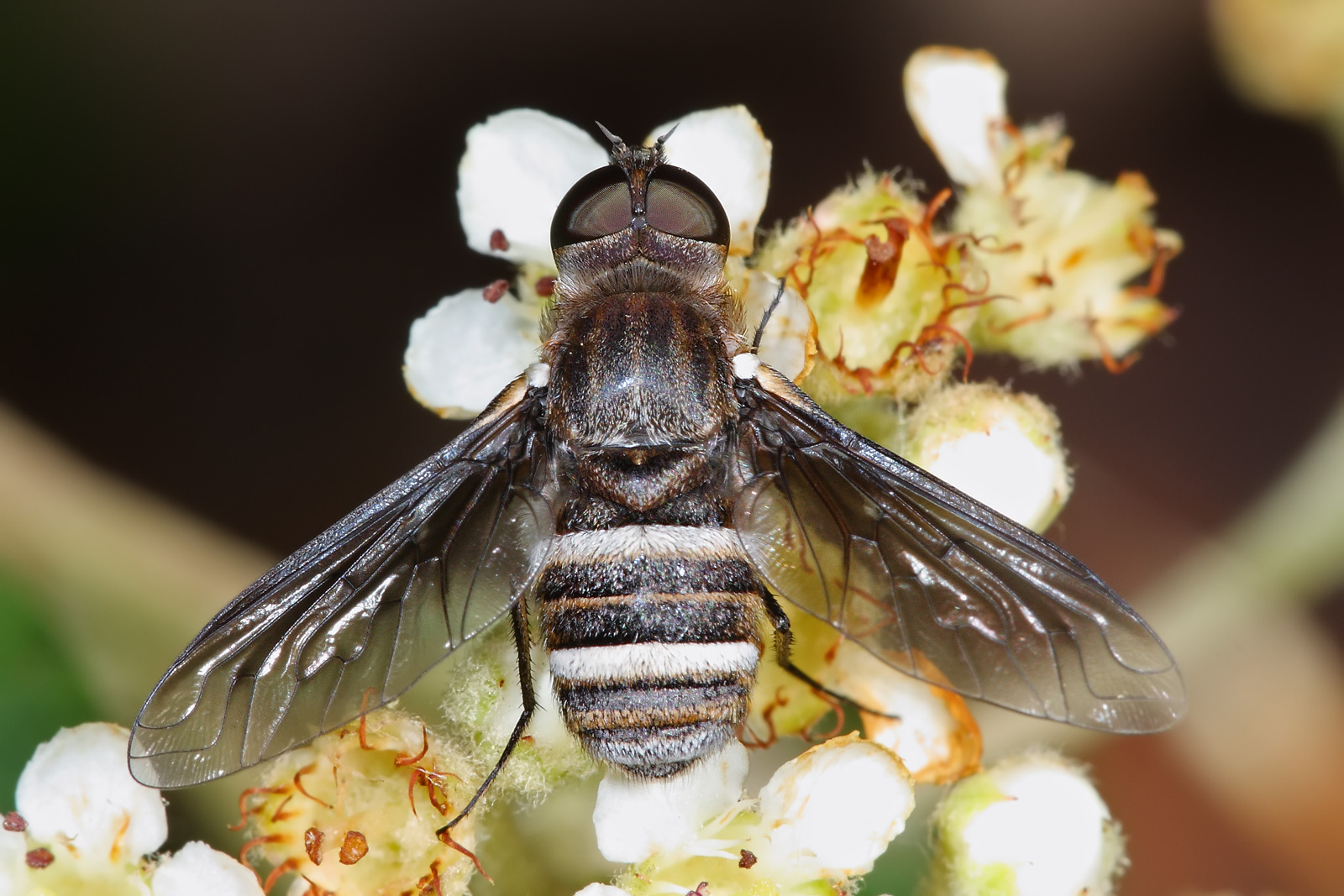
Exoprosopa sp. feeding

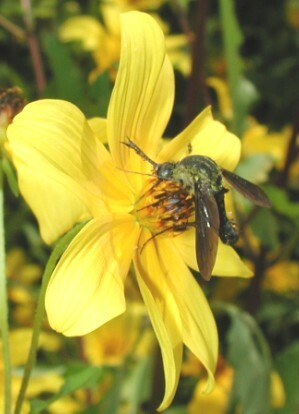
Lepidophora on Bidens laevis
