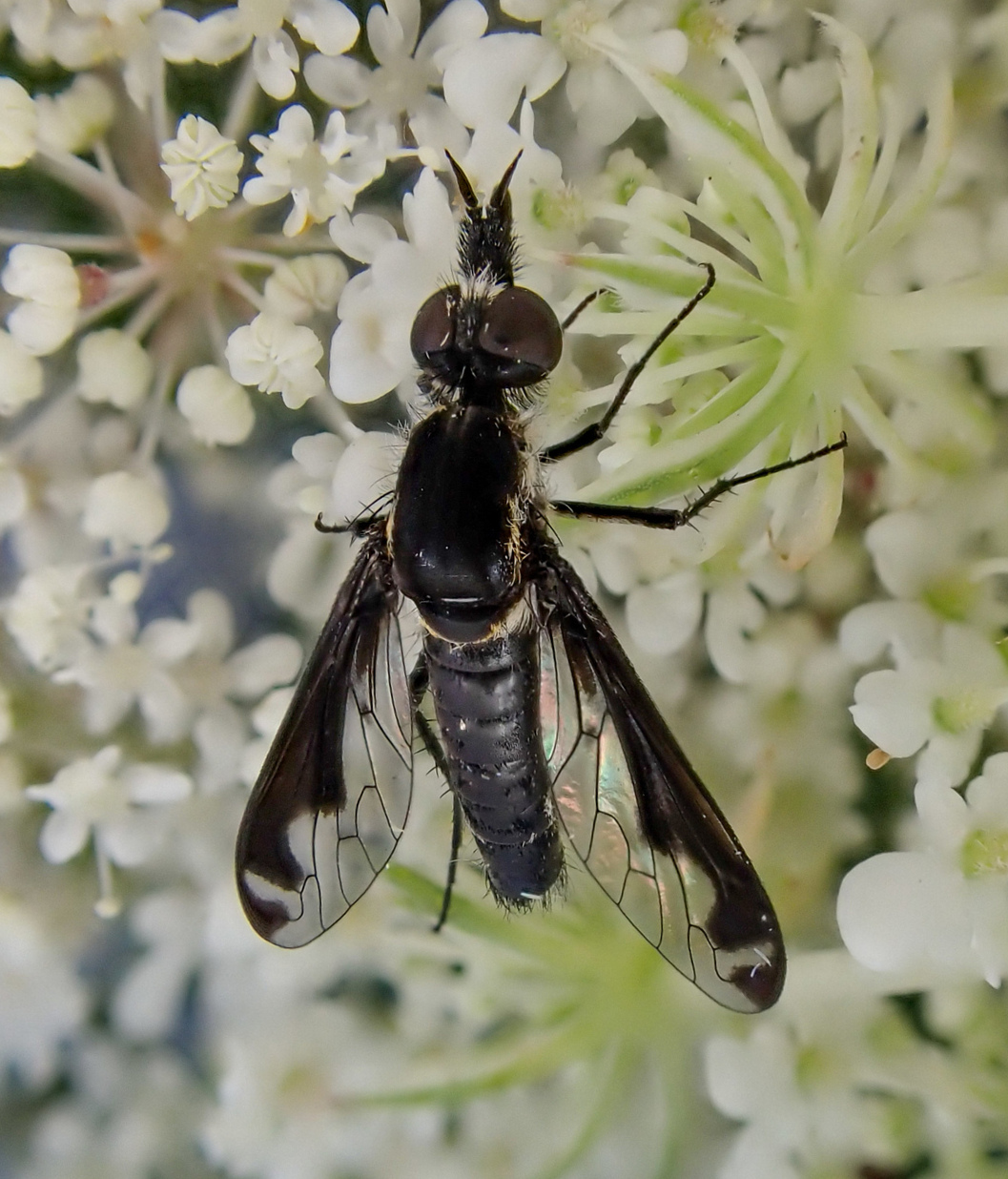

Conservation status
- Naturally Uncommon (NZ TCS)

Scientific classification
- Kingdom: Animalia
- Phylum: Arthropoda
- Clade: Pancrustacea
- Class: Insecta
- Order: Diptera
- Family: Bombyliidae
- Genus: Tillyardomyia; Tonnoir, 1927
- Species: T. gracilis

Binomial name
- Tillyardomyia gracilis Tonnoir, 1927

= Tillyardomyia =

Species of fly

Tillyardomyia is a genus of bee fly endemic to New Zealand. It has only one species, Tillyardomyia gracilis.

== Taxonomy ==
Both the genus and species was described in 1927 by Belgian entomologist André Léon Tonnoir from specimens collected at Dun Mountain, Ohakune and Maitai Valley in New Zealand. The genus name refers to Robert John Tillyard, another prominent entomologist. The holotype is stored in the New Zealand Arthropod Collection under registration number NZAC04019550.

== Description ==
The adults are around 10mm in length with a wing size of 7.5mm. The body, head and legs are blackish with some yellowish hairs/scales at certain spots. Roughly, the antennae are about as long as the head. On the thorax, there is a row of yellowish hairs laterally. The wings are darkly marked in the upper half.

== Distribution ==
Tillyardomyia gracilis is endemic to New Zealand where it is known from scattered localities throughout the country. They've been recorded as far north as Great Barrier Island in the North Island and as far south as Dunedin in the South Island. It is the only species of Bombyliidae endemic to New Zealand. However, an unknown species of Geron is also known from Hawkes Bay in New Zealand. It is presumed to be an exotic species.

== Conservation status ==
Under the New Zealand Threat Classification System, this species is listed as "Naturally Uncommon" with the qualifiers of "Biologically Sparse".
