= Poecilognathus relativitae =

Scientific classification
- Kingdom: Animalia
- Phylum: Arthropoda
- Class: Insecta
- Order: Diptera
- Family: Bombyliidae
- Genus: Poecilognathus
- Species: P. relativitae

Binomial name
- Poecilognathus relativitae (Evenhuis, 1985)

Synonyms
- Phthiria relativitae Evenhuis, 1985

Species of fly

Poecilognathus relativitae, originally known as Phthiria relativitae, is a species of fly of the family Bombyliidae, subfamily Phthiriinae, that is found in California. It was discovered by Neal Evenhuis, who named it as a pun on the "theory of relativity".

Subsequent analysis revealed that the insect is not of the genus Phthiria, and it was renamed.
