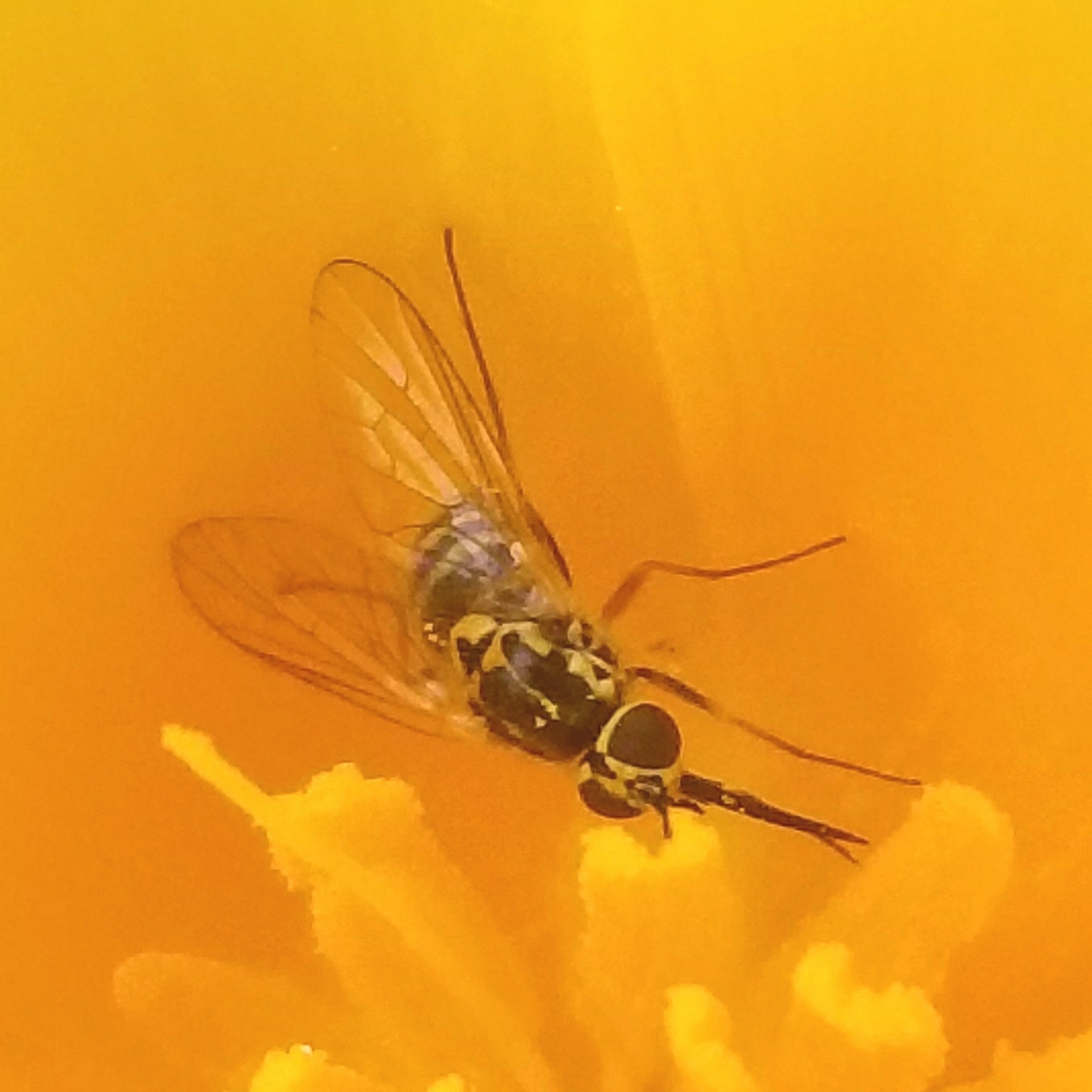
- Neacreotrichus, California

Scientific classification
- Domain: Eukaryota
- Kingdom: Animalia
- Phylum: Arthropoda
- Class: Insecta
- Order: Diptera
- Family: Bombyliidae
- Subfamily: Phthiriinae
- Tribe: Phthiriini; Becker, 1913

= Phthiriini =

Tribe of flies

Phthiriini is a tribe of bee flies in the family Bombyliidae. There are about 6 genera and more than 90 described species in Phthiriini, found worldwide.

== Genera ==
These six genera belong to the tribe Phthiriini:

- Acreophthiria Evenhuis, 1986
- Acreotrichus Macquart, 1850
- Australiphthiria Evenhuis, 1986
- Neacreotrichus Cockerell, 1917
- Phthiria Meigen, 1803
- Pygocona Hull, 1973
