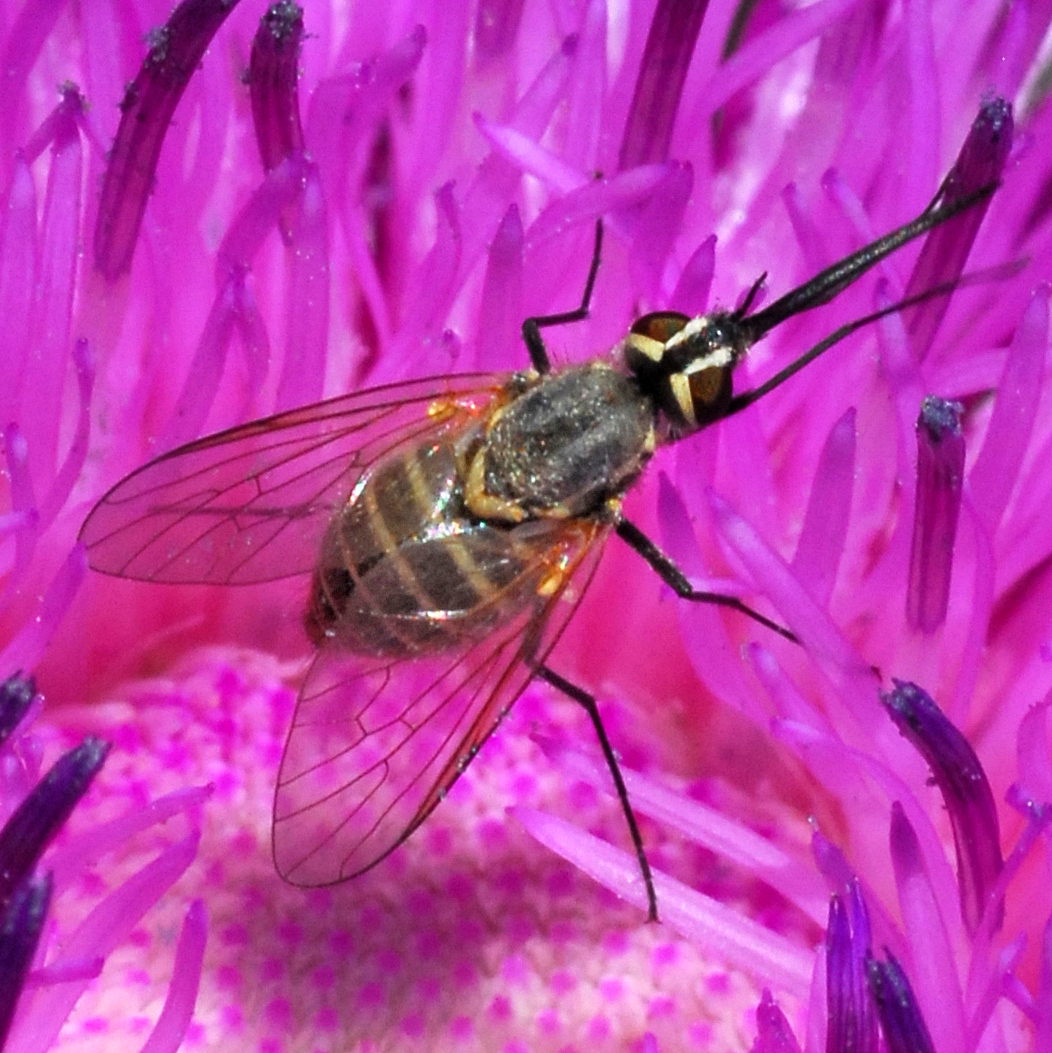
- Phthiria vagans, female

Scientific classification
- Kingdom: Animalia
- Phylum: Arthropoda
- Class: Insecta
- Order: Diptera
- Family: Bombyliidae
- Genus: Phthiria
- Species: P. vagans

Binomial name
- Phthiria vagans Loew, 1846

Synonyms
- Phthiria pallescens Engel, 1933

= Phthiria vagans =

Species of fly

Phthiria vagans is a species of 'bee flies' belonging to the family Bombyliidae.

== Distribution ==
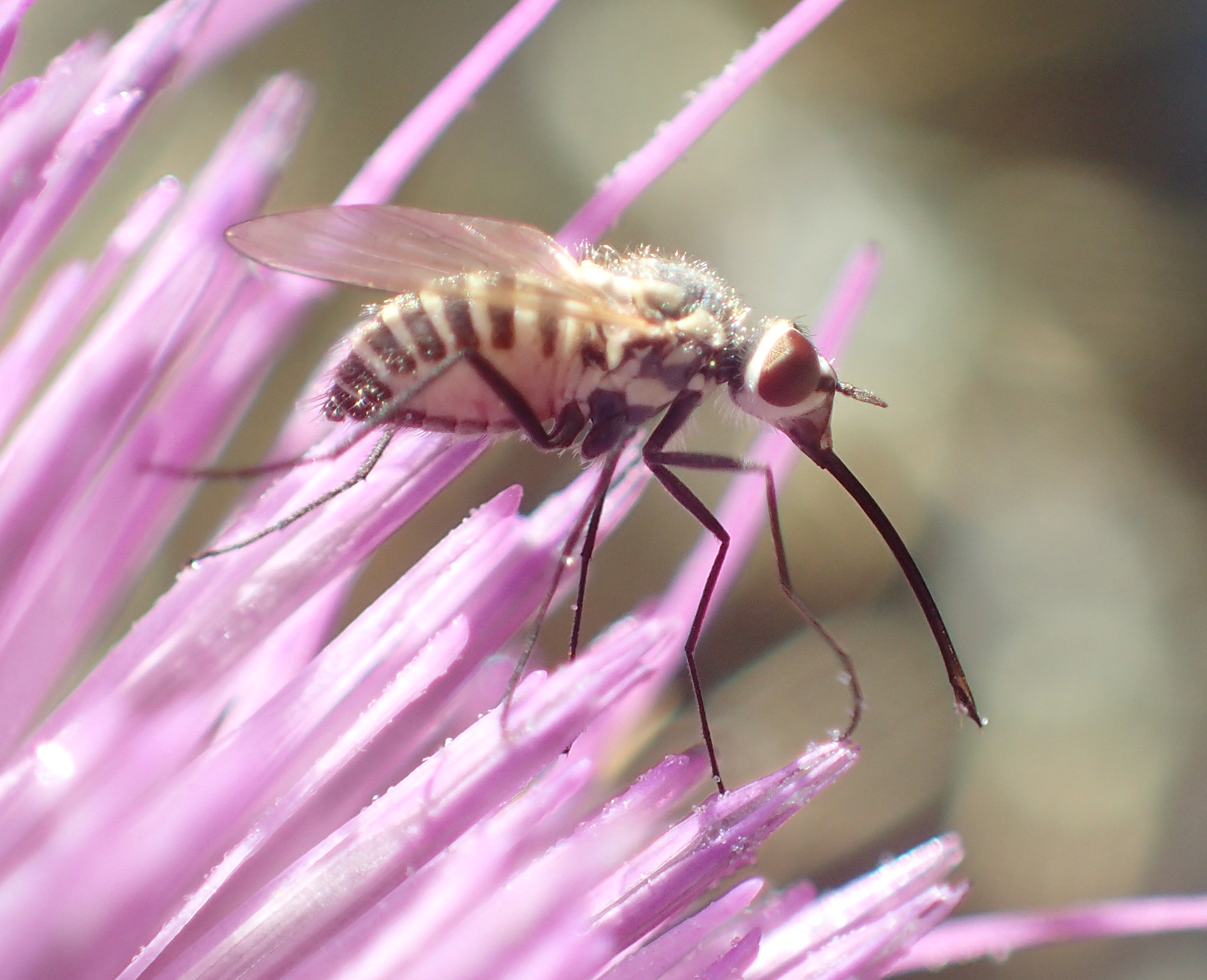
Side view

This palearctic species is present in part of Europe (Croatia, France, Greece, Hungary, Italy, North Macedonia, Romania and Spain), in Central and North European Russia, in Iran and in Israel, and in Turkey.

== Description ==
Phthiria vagans can reach a body length of about 4–5 mm (0.16–0.20 in). These tiny beeflies are mainly blackish, with white stripes on the abdomen. Metapleuron shows micro-pubescence. The upper part of the face and the area around the antennae are black-haired. They show a short dorsal prong at the tips of the antennae. Palpus extends at least as far as antennae. Last sternite in male deeply concave on posterior margin.

The red eyes are touching in males of all Phthiriinae, while they are separate in females (sexual dimorphism). The base of the wings is yellowish, the central part is brown, while the tip is transparent.

== Biology ==
These beeflies are active during the middle of the day (heliophilic).
