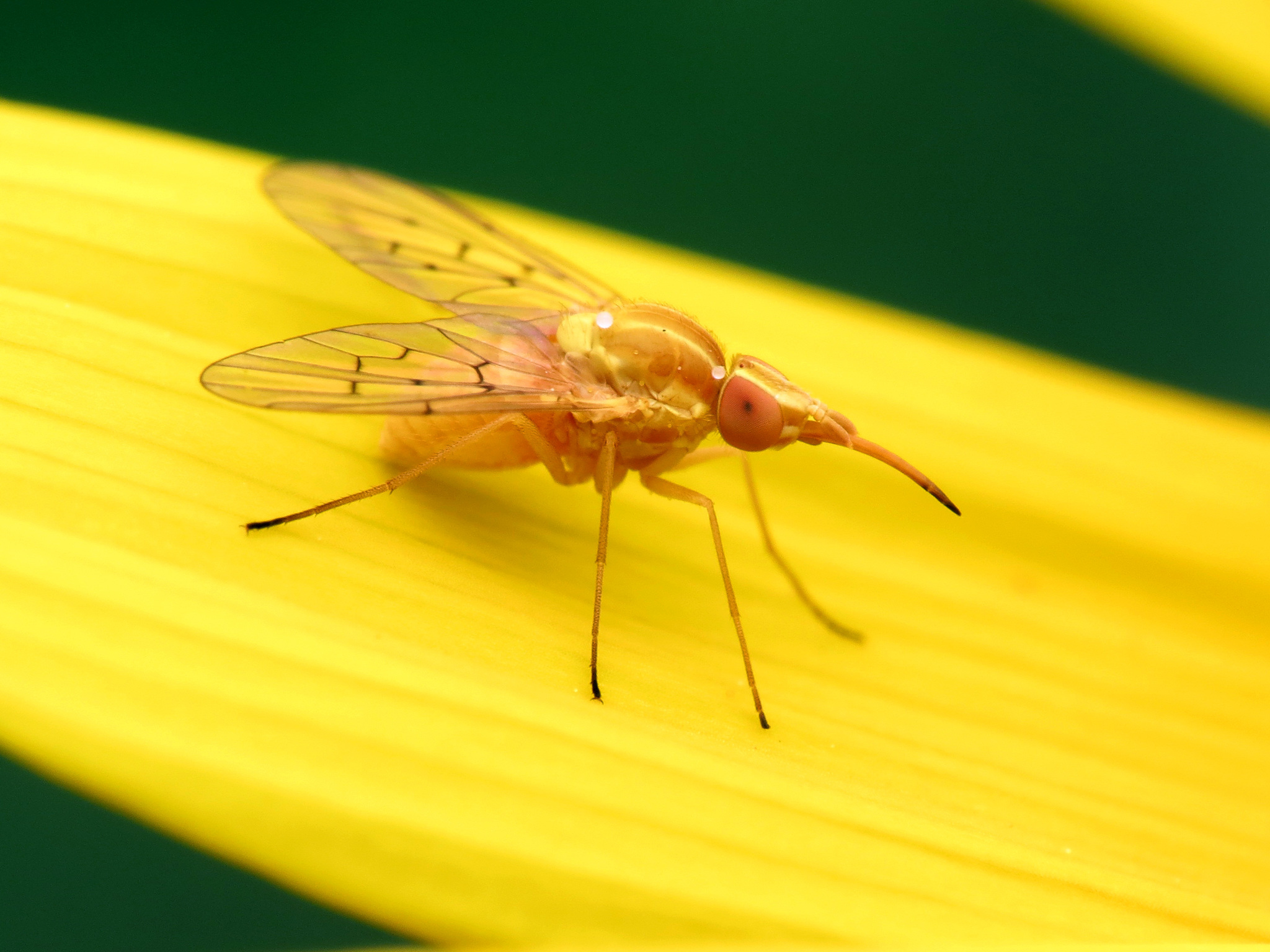
- Poecilognathus unimaculatus, Arizona

Scientific classification
- Kingdom: Animalia
- Phylum: Arthropoda
- Class: Insecta
- Order: Diptera
- Family: Bombyliidae
- Subfamily: Phthiriinae
- Genus: Poecilognathus
- Species: P. unimaculatus

Binomial name
- Poecilognathus unimaculatus (Coquillett, 1904)

Synonyms
- Phthiria unimaculata Coquillett, 1904

= Poecilognathus unimaculatus =

Species of flies

Poecilognathus unimaculatus is a species of bee fly in the family Bombyliidae, found in North America.
