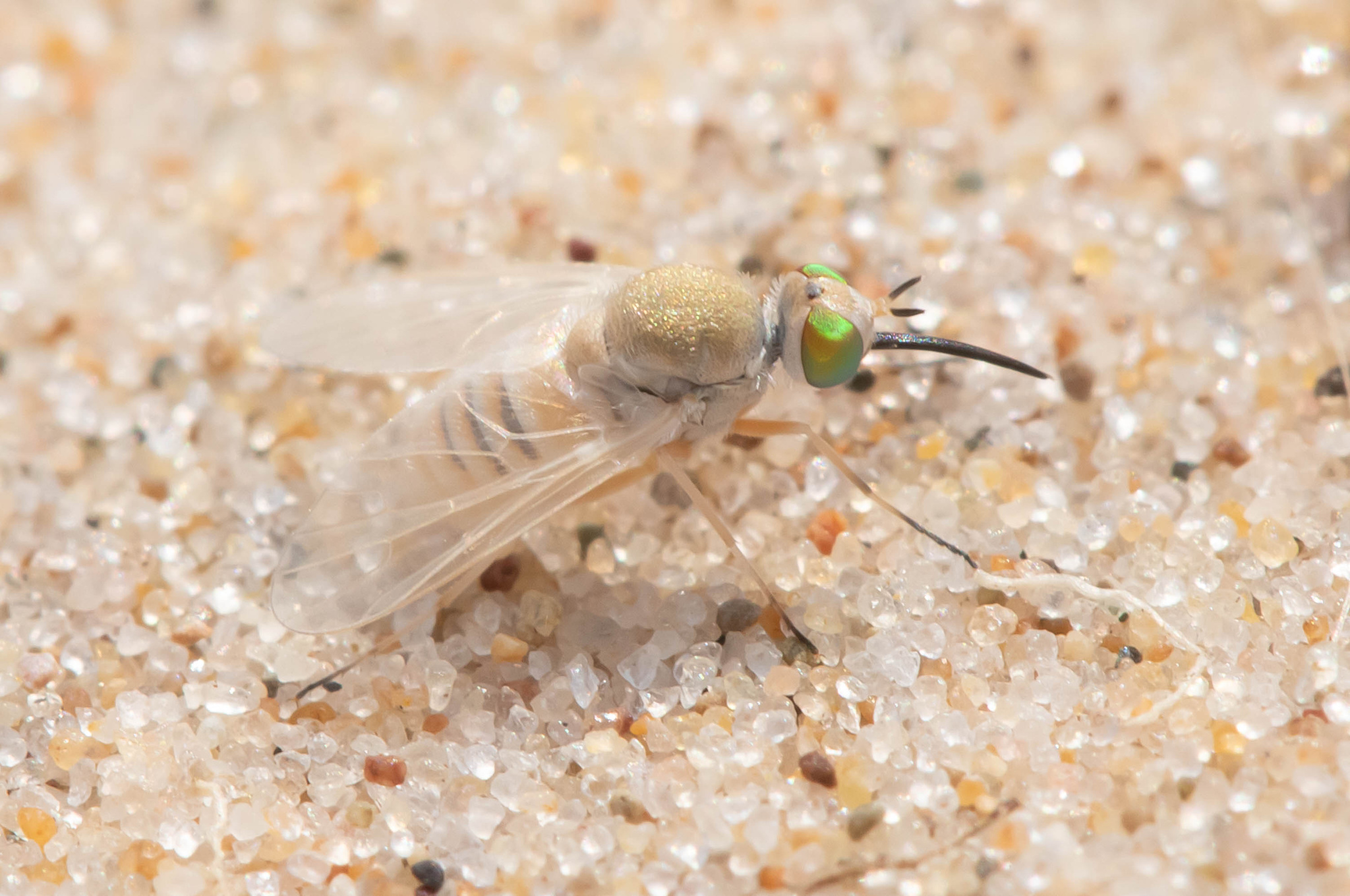

Scientific classification
- Domain: Eukaryota
- Kingdom: Animalia
- Phylum: Arthropoda
- Class: Insecta
- Order: Diptera
- Family: Bombyliidae
- Tribe: Poecilognathini
- Genus: Tmemophlebia
- Species: T. coquilletti

Binomial name
- Tmemophlebia coquilletti (Johnson, 1902)

Synonyms
- Phthiria coquilletti Johnson, 1902

= Tmemophlebia coquilletti =

Species of fly

Tmemophlebia coquilletti is a species of bee fly in the family Bombyliidae.
