= Tmemophlebia =

Scientific classification
- Domain: Eukaryota
- Kingdom: Animalia
- Phylum: Arthropoda
- Class: Insecta
- Order: Diptera
- Family: Bombyliidae
- Subfamily: Phthiriinae
- Tribe: Poecilognathini
- Genus: Tmemophlebia; Evenhuis, 1986

Species
- See text

Genus of flies

Tmemophlebia is a North and South American genus of bee flies in the family Bombyliidae. There are about 17 described species in Tmemophlebia.

== Species ==
These 17 species belong to the genus Tmemophlebia:

- Tmemophlebia albida (Wiedemann, 1821)
- Tmemophlebia aldrichi (Johnson, 1903)
- Tmemophlebia amplicella (Coquillett, 1904)
- Tmemophlebia anoexis Hall & Evenhuis, 2004
- Tmemophlebia coquilletti (Johnson, 1902)
- †Tmemophlebia carolinae Evenhuis & Greenwalt, 2022 (Eocene)
- Tmemophlebia fasciventris Curran in Curran, Alexander, Twinn & Van Duzee, 1928
- Tmemophlebia krypton Hall & Evenhuis, 2004
- Tmemophlebia melanofemur Hall & Evenhuis, 2004
- Tmemophlebia mexicana Hall & Evenhuis, 2004
- Tmemophlebia moctezuma Hall & Evenhuis, 2004
- Tmemophlebia painterorum Hall & Evenhuis, 2004
- Tmemophlebia psammonoma Hall & Evenhuis, 2004
- Tmemophlebia testacea (Macquart, 1840)
- Tmemophlebia tzahui Hall & Evenhuis, 2004
- Tmemophlebia vockerothi Hall & Evenhuis, 2004
- Tmemophlebia xanthotibia Hall & Evenhuis, 2004
