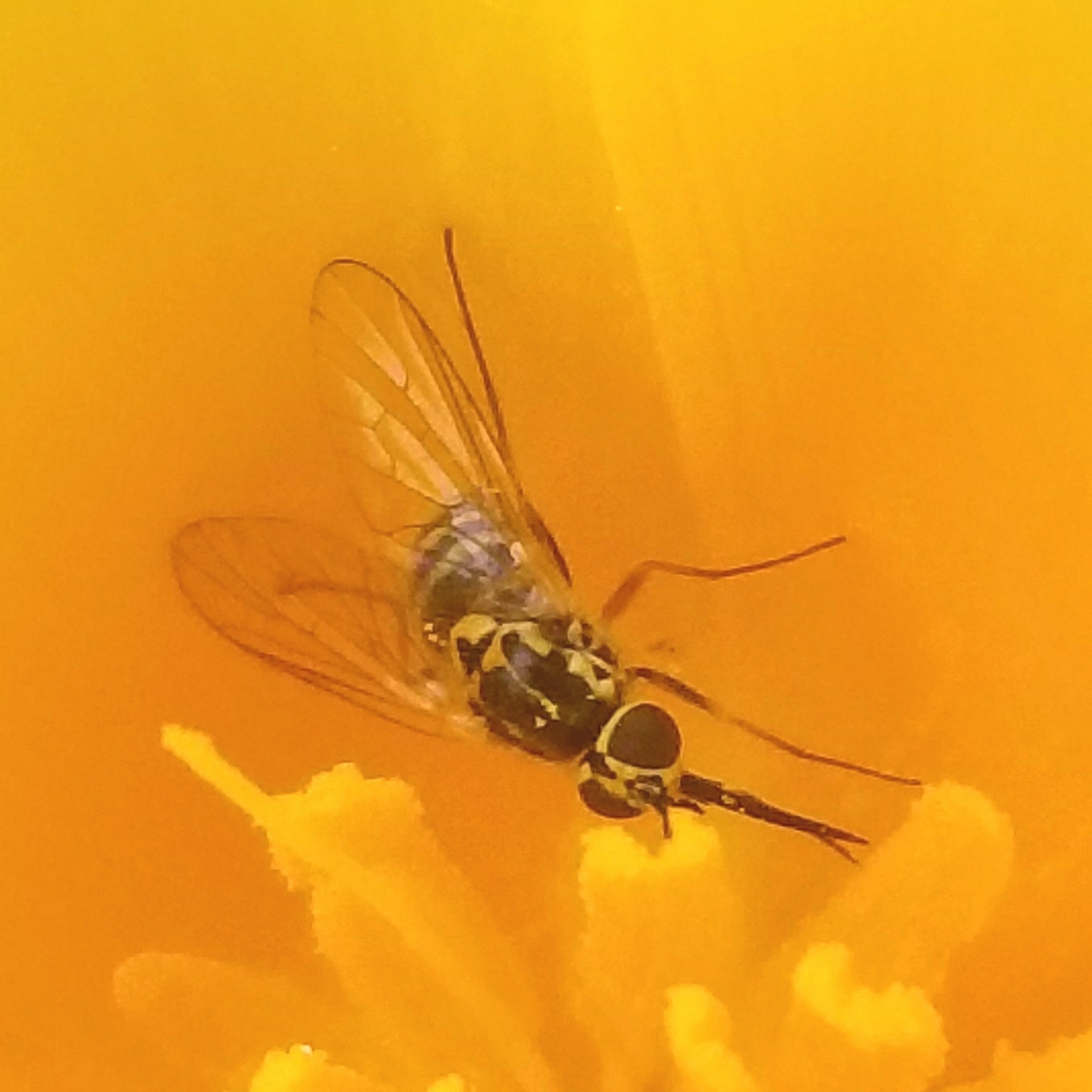
- Neacreotrichus, California

Scientific classification
- Domain: Eukaryota
- Kingdom: Animalia
- Phylum: Arthropoda
- Class: Insecta
- Order: Diptera
- Family: Bombyliidae
- Subfamily: Phthiriinae
- Tribe: Phthiriini
- Genus: Neacreotrichus; Cockerell, 1917

= Neacreotrichus =

Genus of flies

Neacreotrichus is a genus of bee flies in the family Bombyliidae. There are about 13 described species in Neacreotrichus, found in the United States and Mexico.

== Species ==
These 13 species belong to the genus Neacreotrichus:

- Neacreotrichus aztec (Painter & Painter, 1962)
- Neacreotrichus cingulatus (Loew, 1846)
- Neacreotrichus consors (Osten Sacken, 1887)
- Neacreotrichus diversus (Coquillett, 1894)
- Neacreotrichus dolorosus (Williston, 1901)
- Neacreotrichus floralis (Coquillett, 1894)
- Neacreotrichus humilis (Osten Sacken, 1877)
- Neacreotrichus melanoscuta (Coquillett, 1904)
- Neacreotrichus mixteca (Painter & Painter, 1962)
- Neacreotrichus olmeca (Painter & Painter, 1962)
- Neacreotrichus picturatus (Coquillett, 1904)
- Neacreotrichus toltec (Painter & Painter, 1962)
- Neacreotrichus vittiventris (Coquillett, 1904)
