= Poecilognathus punctipennis =

Scientific classification
- Kingdom: Animalia
- Phylum: Arthropoda
- Class: Insecta
- Order: Diptera
- Family: Bombyliidae
- Genus: Poecilognathus
- Species: P. punctipennis

Binomial name
- Poecilognathus punctipennis (Walker, 1849)

Synonyms
- Phthiria punctipennis Walker, 1849

Species of fly

Poecilognathus punctipennis is a species of bee fly in the family Bombyliidae. It is found in Florida and Georgia.
