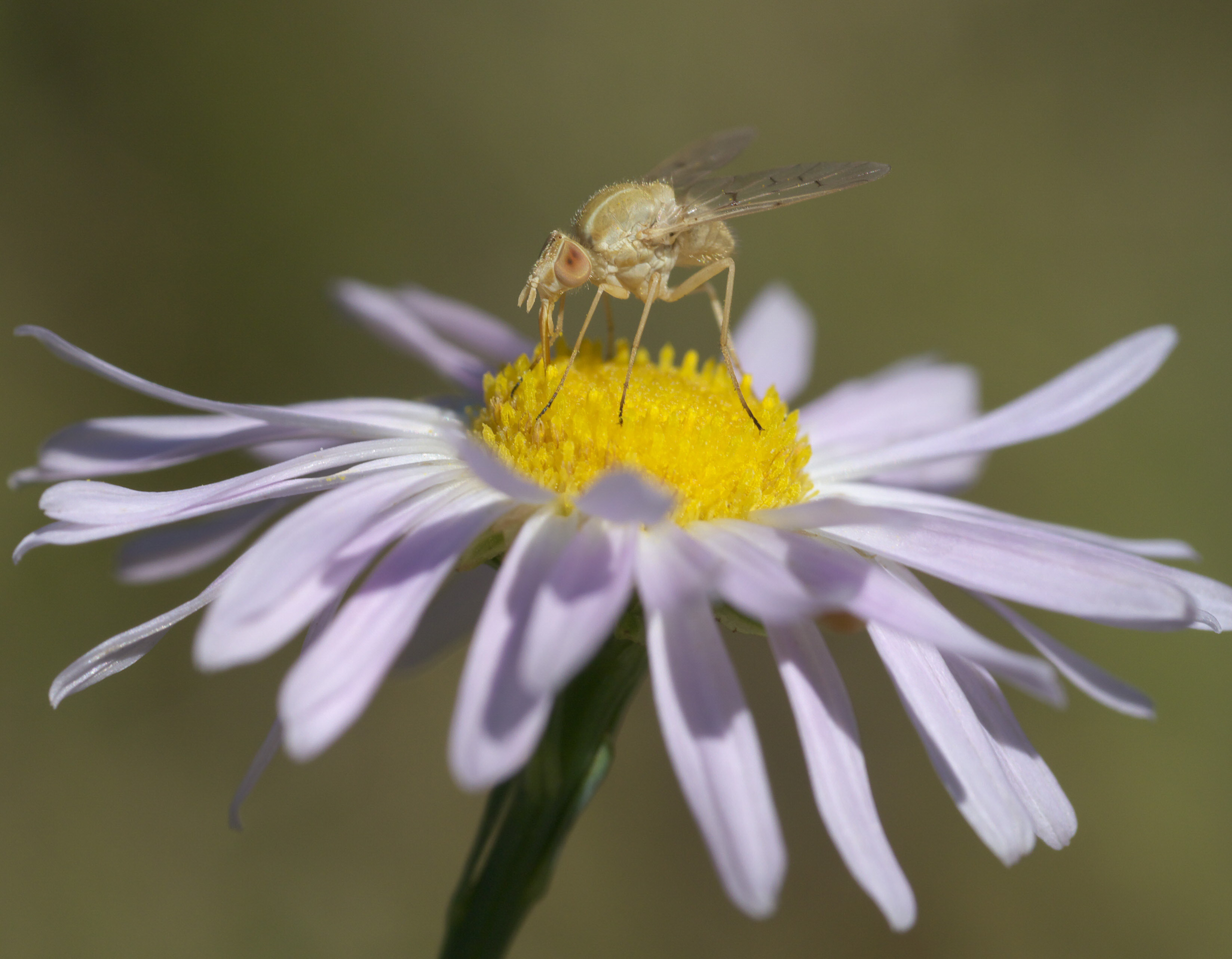

Scientific classification
- Kingdom: Animalia
- Phylum: Arthropoda
- Class: Insecta
- Order: Diptera
- Family: Bombyliidae
- Subfamily: Phthiriinae
- Genus: Poecilognathus; Jaennicke, 1867

= Poecilognathus =

Genus of flies

Poecilognathus is a genus of bee flies in the family Bombyliidae, found in North, Central, and South America. There are at least 20 described species in Poecilognathus.

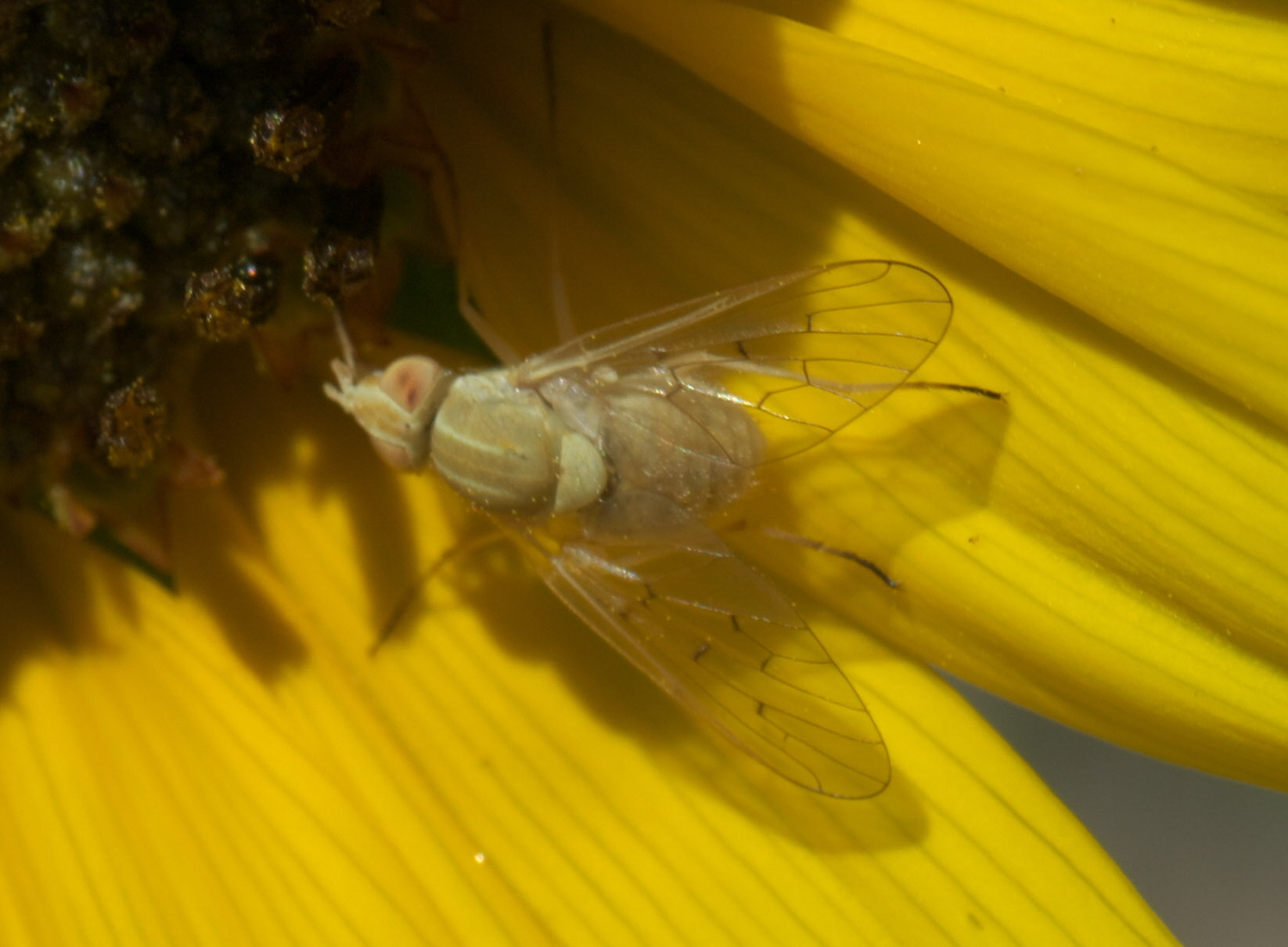

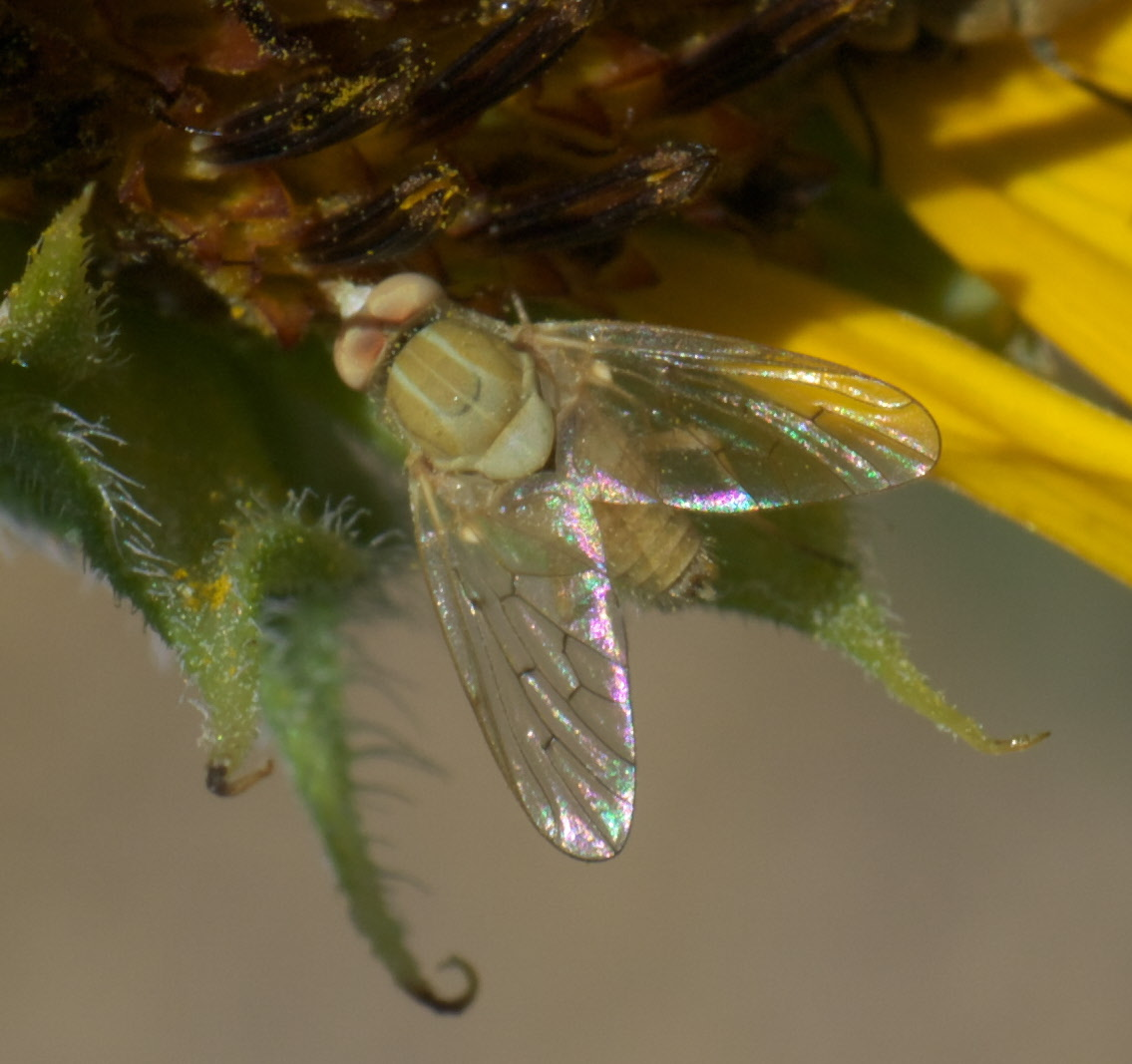

== Species ==
These 22 species belong to the genus Poecilognathus:

- Poecilognathus badia (Coquillett, 1904)
- Poecilognathus bicolor (Coquillett, 1904)
- Poecilognathus damfino Evenhuis, 2024
- Poecilognathus fulvidus (Coquillett, 1904)
- Poecilognathus inornatus (Coquillett, 1904)
- Poecilognathus loewi (Painter, 1965)
- Poecilognathus marginatus (Coquillett, 1904)
- Poecilognathus philippianus (Rondani, 1863)
- Poecilognathus pulchellus (Williston, 1901)
- Poecilognathus punctipennis (Walker, 1849)
- Poecilognathus radius (Coquillett, 1904)
- Poecilognathus relativitae (Evenhuis, 1985)
- Poecilognathus scolopax (Osten Sacken, 1877)
- Poecilognathus stictopennis (Hall, 1976)
- Poecilognathus sulphureus (Loew, 1863)
- Poecilognathus testacea (Macquart, 1840)
- Poecilognathus testaceus (Macquart, 1840)
- Poecilognathus thlipsomyzoides Jaennicke, 1867
- Poecilognathus unicolor (Bezzi, 1925)
- Poecilognathus unimaculatus (Coquillett, 1904)
- Poecilognathus xanthogaster (Hall, 1976)
- † Poecilognathus stigmalis (Cockerell, 1915)
