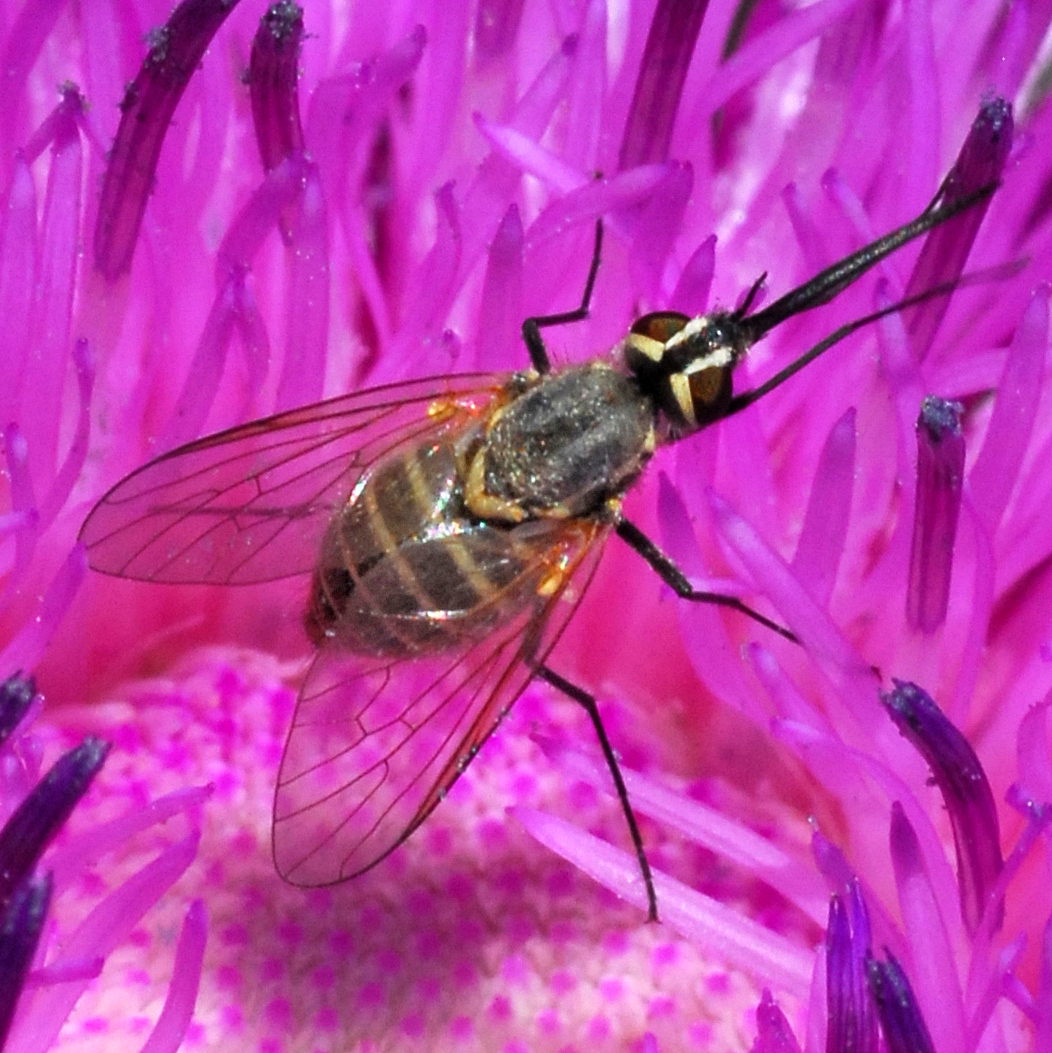
- Phthiria vagans

Scientific classification
- Kingdom: Animalia
- Phylum: Arthropoda
- Class: Insecta
- Order: Diptera
- Family: Bombyliidae
- Subfamily: Phthiriinae
- Genus: Phthiria; Meigen, 1820

= Phthiria =

Genus of flies

Phthiria is a genus of bee flies in the family Bombyliidae. There are over 60 described species in the genus, found in Eurasia, Africa, and South America. Related species from North America have been moved to other genera.

== Species ==
Species within this genus include:

- Phthiria alberthessei
- Phthiria albida
- Phthiria albogilva
- Phthiria aldrichi
- Phthiria amplicella
- Phthiria asiatica
- Phthiria atriceps
- Phthiria austrandina
- Phthiria aztec
- Phthiria barbatula
- Phthiria brunnescens
- Phthiria cana
- Phthiria canescens
- Phthiria chilena
- Phthiria cingulata
- Phthiria cognata
- Phthiria compressa
- Phthiria conocephala
- Phthiria consors
- Phthiria conspicua
- Phthiria crocogramma
- Phthiria dolorosa
- Phthiria exilis
- Phthiria fallax
- Phthiria fasciventris
- Phthiria freidbergi
- Phthiria freyi
- Phthiria fulva
- Phthiria gaedii
- Phthiria gracilis
- Phthiria grisea
- Phthiria hesperia
- Phthiria homochroma
- Phthiria hypoleuca
- Phthiria incisa
- Phthiria inconspicua
- Phthiria lacteipennis
- Phthiria laeta
- Phthiria lanigera
- Phthiria lazaroi
- Phthiria lucidipennis
- Phthiria lurida
- Phthiria maroccana
- Phthiria merlei
- Phthiria minuta
- Phthiria mixteca
- Phthiria mongolica
- Phthiria namaquensis
- Phthiria nigribarba
- Phthiria nitidigena
- Phthiria olmeca
- Phthiria ombriosus
- Phthiria ovalicornis
- Phthiria pilirostris
- Phthiria pubescens
- Phthiria pulchella
- Phthiria pulchripes
- Phthiria pulicaria
- Phthiria pulicarius
- Phthiria pulla
- Phthiria quadrinotata
- Phthiria rhomphaea
- Phthiria salmayensis
- Phthiria scutellaris
- Phthiria simmondsii
- Phthiria simonyi
- Phthiria socotrae
- Phthiria stictica
- Phthiria subnitens
- Phthiria tinctipennis
- Phthiria toltec
- Phthiria tricolor
- Phthiria tristis
- Phthiria umbripennis
- Phthiria vagans
- Phthiria variegata
- Phthiria varipes
- Phthiria virgata
- Phthiria xanthaspis
