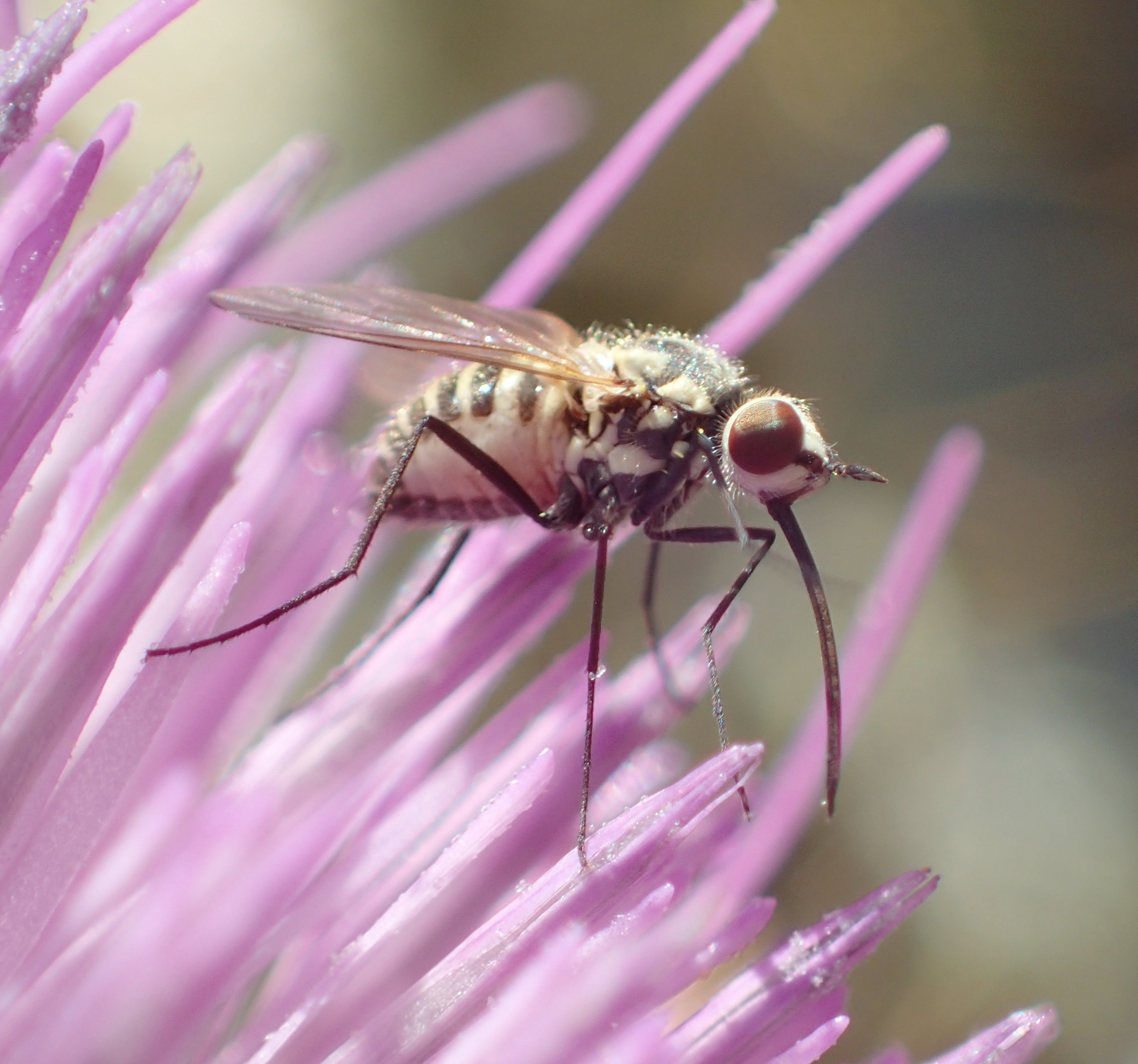
- Phthiria vagans

Scientific classification
- Domain: Eukaryota
- Kingdom: Animalia
- Phylum: Arthropoda
- Class: Insecta
- Order: Diptera
- Family: Bombyliidae
- Subfamily: Phthiriinae

= Phthiriinae =

Subfamily of flies

Phthiriinae is a subfamily of bee flies in the family Bombyliidae. There are about 11 genera and more than 120 described species in Phthiriinae.

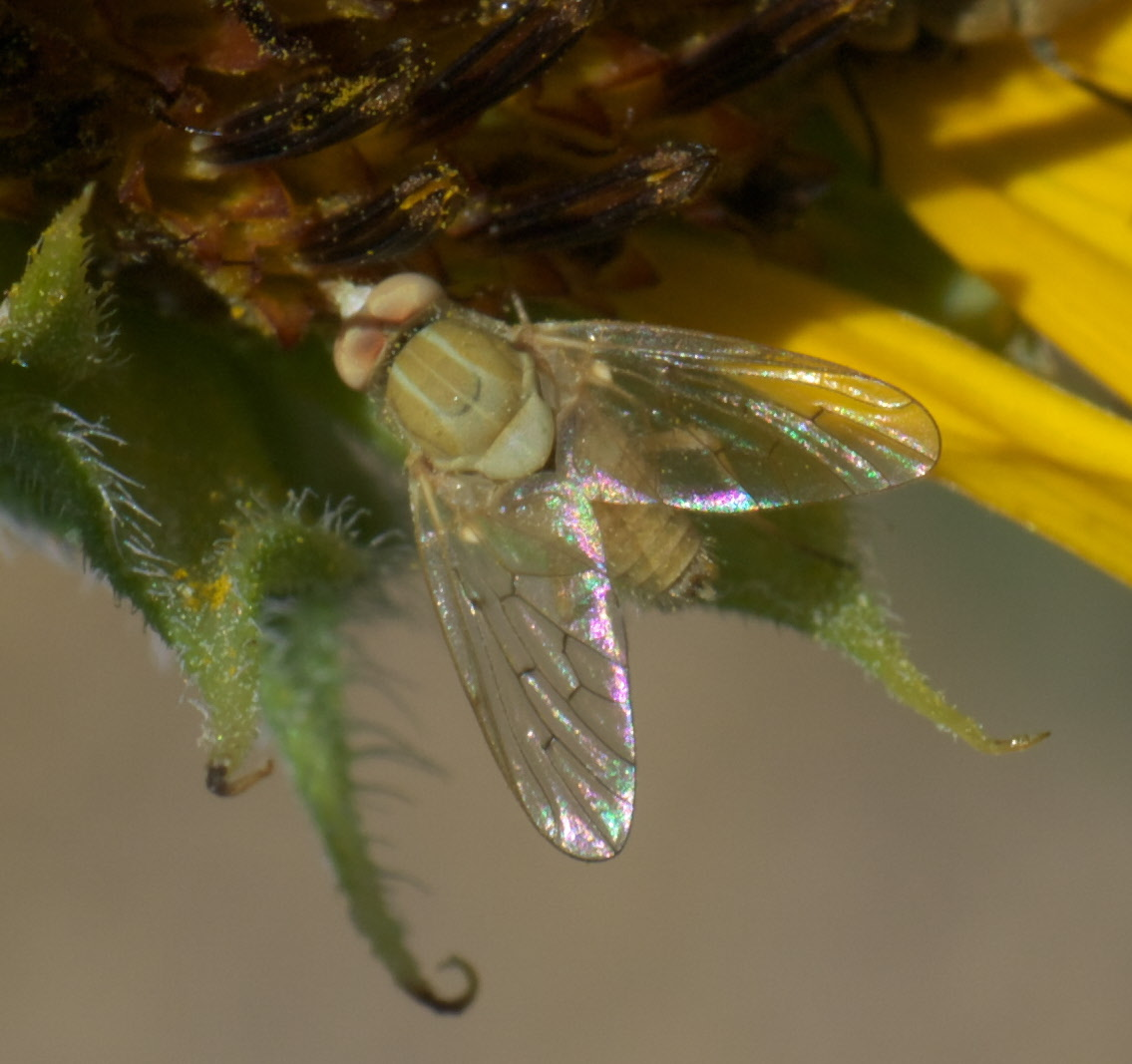
Poecilognathus

== Genera ==
These 11 genera belong to the subfamily Phthiriinae:

- Acreophthiria Evenhuis, 1986^{i c g b}
- Acreotrichus Macquart, 1850^{c g}
- Australiphthiria Evenhuis, 1986^{c g}
- Euryphthiria Evenhuis, 1986^{i c g}
- Neacreotrichus Cockerell, 1917^{i c g b}
- Phthiria Meigen, 1803^{i c g}
- Poecilognathus Jaennicke, 1867^{i c g b}
- Pygocona Hull, 1973^{c g}
- Relictiphthiria Evenhuis, 1986^{i c g}
- Tmemophlebia Evenhuis, 1986^{i c g b}
- † Elektrophthiria Nel, 2006^{g}

Data sources: i = ITIS, c = Catalogue of Life, g = GBIF, b = Bugguide.net
