= Lordotus planus =

Scientific classification
- Domain: Eukaryota
- Kingdom: Animalia
- Phylum: Arthropoda
- Class: Insecta
- Order: Diptera
- Family: Bombyliidae
- Subfamily: Lordotinae
- Genus: Lordotus
- Species: L. planus

Binomial name
- Lordotus planus Osten Sacken, 1877

Species of fly

Lordotus planus is a species of bee fly in the family Bombyliidae.
