= Lordotus gibbus =

Scientific classification
- Domain: Eukaryota
- Kingdom: Animalia
- Phylum: Arthropoda
- Class: Insecta
- Order: Diptera
- Family: Bombyliidae
- Subfamily: Lordotinae
- Genus: Lordotus
- Species: L. gibbus

Binomial name
- Lordotus gibbus Loew, 1863

Synonyms
- Adelidea flava Jaennicke, 1867

Species of fly

Lordotus gibbus is a species of bee fly in the family Bombyliidae.
