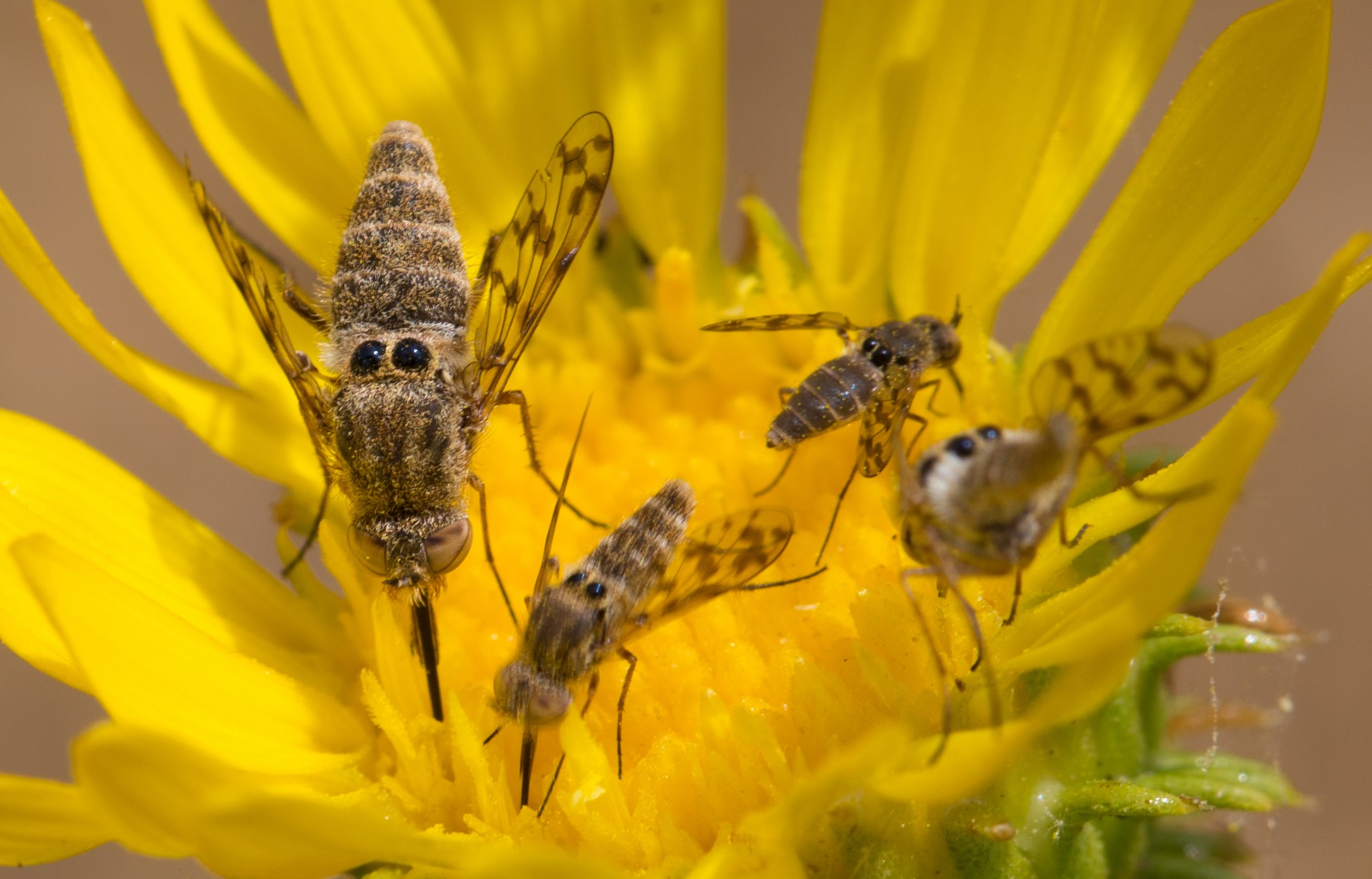

Scientific classification
- Kingdom: Animalia
- Phylum: Arthropoda
- Class: Insecta
- Order: Diptera
- Family: Bombyliidae
- Genus: Geminaria
- Species: G. canalis

Binomial name
- Geminaria canalis (Coquillett, 1887)

Synonyms
- Lordotus canalis Coquillett, 1887

= Geminaria canalis =

Species of fly

Geminaria canalis is a species of bee flies in the family Bombyliidae that occurs in southwestern North America.

It was first described in 1887 by Daniel William Coquillett as Lordotus canalis.
