= Geminaria pellucida =

Scientific classification
- Domain: Eukaryota
- Kingdom: Animalia
- Phylum: Arthropoda
- Class: Insecta
- Order: Diptera
- Family: Bombyliidae
- Genus: Geminaria
- Species: G. pellucida

Binomial name
- Geminaria pellucida Coquillett, 1894

Species of fly

Geminaria pellucida is a species of bee flies in the family Bombyliidae.
