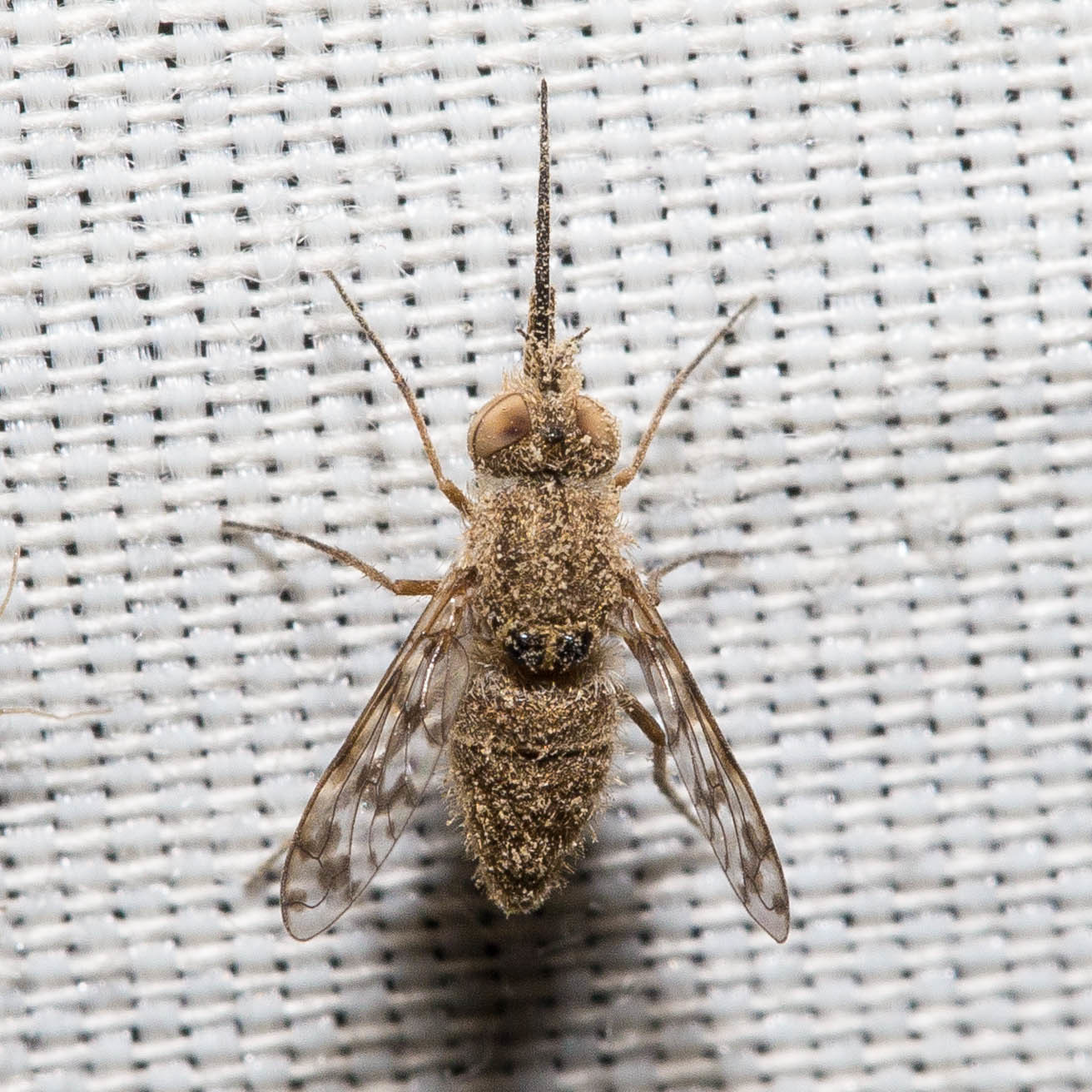
- Geminaria canalis

Scientific classification
- Domain: Eukaryota
- Kingdom: Animalia
- Phylum: Arthropoda
- Class: Insecta
- Order: Diptera
- Family: Bombyliidae
- Subfamily: Lordotinae
- Genus: Geminaria; Coquillett, 1894

= Geminaria (fly) =

Genus of flies

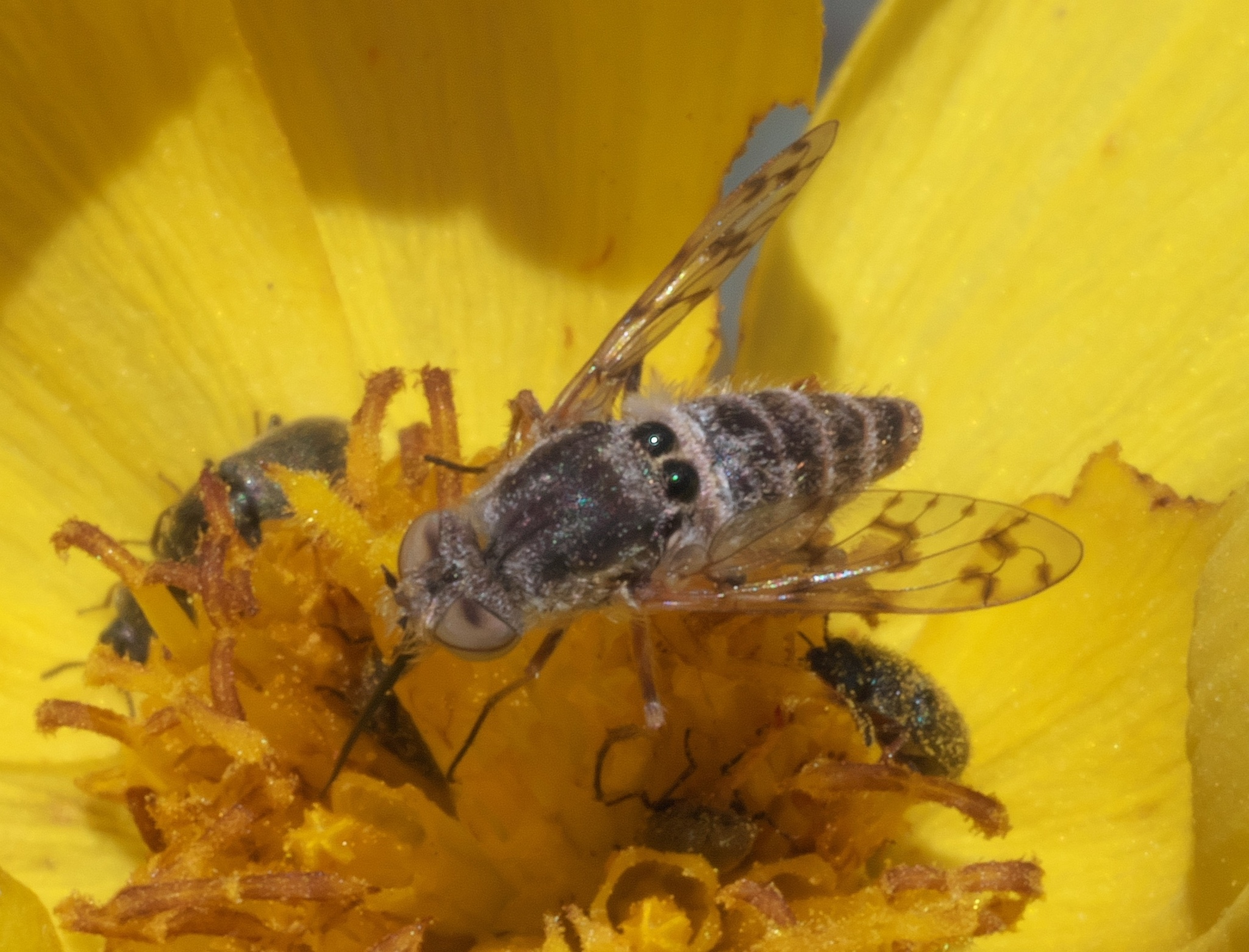
Geminaria canalis, Arizona

Geminaria is a genus of bee flies (insects in the family Bombyliidae).

As a result of research published in 2019, this genus was transferred from the subfamily Bombyliinae to Lordotinae.

== Species ==
These two species belong to the genus Geminaria:

- Geminaria canalis (Coquillett, 1887)
- Geminaria pellucida Coquillett, 1894
