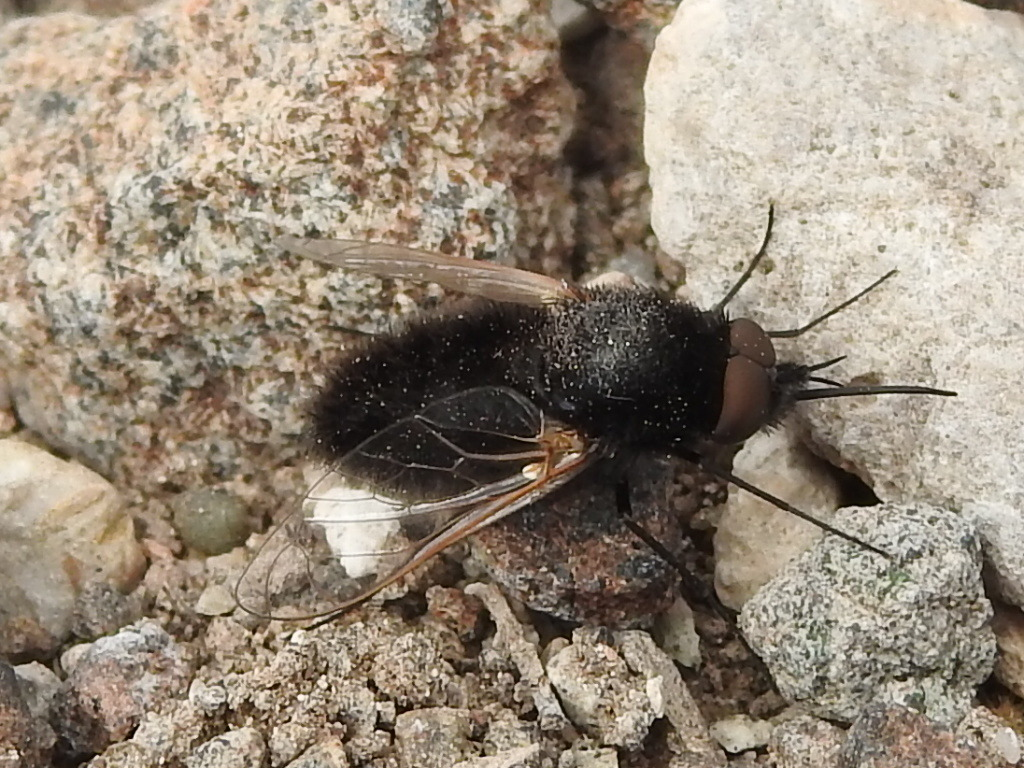

Scientific classification
- Domain: Eukaryota
- Kingdom: Animalia
- Phylum: Arthropoda
- Class: Insecta
- Order: Diptera
- Family: Bombyliidae
- Genus: Lordotus
- Species: L. divisus

Binomial name
- Lordotus divisus Cresson, 1919

Synonyms
- Lordotus niger Cresson, 1923

= Lordotus divisus =

Species of fly

Lordotus divisus is a species of bee fly in the family Bombyliidae.
