= Lordotus junceus =

Scientific classification
- Domain: Eukaryota
- Kingdom: Animalia
- Phylum: Arthropoda
- Class: Insecta
- Order: Diptera
- Family: Bombyliidae
- Genus: Lordotus
- Species: L. junceus

Binomial name
- Lordotus junceus Coquillett, 1891

Species of fly

Lordotus junceus is a species of bee fly in the family Bombyliidae.
