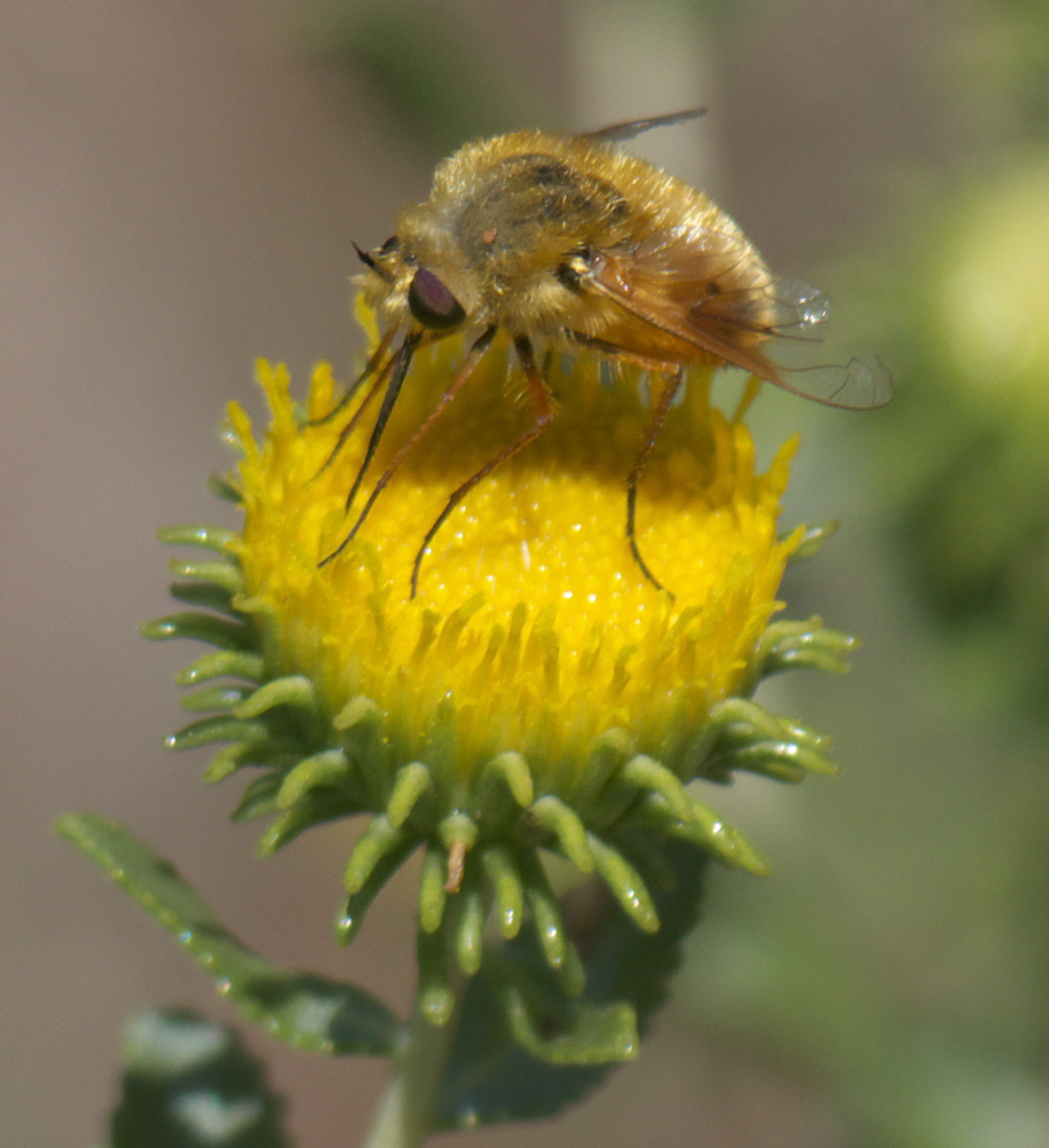

Scientific classification
- Domain: Eukaryota
- Kingdom: Animalia
- Phylum: Arthropoda
- Class: Insecta
- Order: Diptera
- Family: Bombyliidae
- Genus: Lordotus
- Species: L. pulchrissimus

Binomial name
- Lordotus pulchrissimus Williston, 1893

Synonyms
- Lordotus carus Cresson, 1923

= Lordotus pulchrissimus =

Species of fly

Lordotus pulchrissimus is a species of bee fly in the family Bombyliidae, sometimes referred to as the desert bee fly. Few studies have been done on the biology of L. pulchrissimus, although their behavior in the wild has been observed.

The primary food of desert bee flies is rabbitbrush, a flowering desert plant. The flies feed on its nectar and also aid in its pollination.

A trademark of L. pulchrissimus is the daily tendency of males to form large aerial swarm for reasons that are currently unknown. Aside from two studies on this male aggregation behavior, the other behaviors of L. pulchrissimus are less studied.

== Description ==
=== Physical ===
Lordotus pulchrissimus has a signature coat of yellowish fur, clear wings, and large brown eyes. The fly also has a notable proboscis, which is used for collecting nectar from flowering desert brush. Both sexes of L. pulchrissimus are hairy, which distinguishes them from the bare but otherwise very similar species, L. luteolus. L. pulchrissimus is a relatively large bee fly compared to other flies in its family. The males and females are distinct in appearance, which caused them to be misidentified as different species in the past.

==== Male appearance ====
Male L. pulchrissimus have been found to range from 8-16 millimeters in length. They have considerably less fur than the females in addition to larger wingspans. The males' fur typically ranges from yellow to brown in color. They have characteristic black markings on much of their femora.

==== Female appearance ====
Female L. pulchrissimus have been found to range from 2-14 millimeters in length. Females typically have more dense fur than males in addition to brighter shades of orange and yellow fur.

An interesting aspect of female L. pulchrissimus is the color change of their fur. Not only does the fur coat of females age more rapidly than males as they age, the color of their fur when the female is alive fades more quickly than when they are dead. This feature of female's fur was used as a study's metric in determining their age in study, as the females' fur tends to fade at similar rates.

=== Behavioral ===
Lordotus pulchrissimus' activity distributions are notably different from other flies who have ecologically similar requirements and live in similar habitats. They engage in feeding, as well as more aggressive behavior, primarily in the morning time and for very lengthy periods of time. In comparison, most other flies inhabit similar climates and intersperse these energy-costly activities with resting periods throughout the day. This behavior in most flies is more energy efficient than the activity budgeting of L. pulchrissimus, which starts expending energy at the beginning of the day.

==== Male aggregation ====
Observations of male L. pulchrissimus demonstrate the different activity budgeting, who allocate more of their time to energetically costly activities than almost any other species of fly; they spend a majority of their time doing energy-costly activities like engaging in continuous hover flight and lengthy aerial aggregations. While males typically forage somewhat less than females, they use their extra time for more aggregation rather than more rest. Although this behavior could be described as lekking, not enough is known about it to determine the underlying causes.

The most notable behavior pattern that male L. pulchrissimus exhibit is their daily aggregation into aerial swarms on stabilized dunes. This behavior has been primarily studied on the north shore of Mono Lake in California. Although on a given day, males typically arrive first to the swarm area and begin interacting before females arrive, the pattern of male aggregation in L. pulchrissimus is especially distinct as this type of male aggregation typically has more costs than benefits. In most other cases where males aggregate, it occurs as a result of female aggregation, but this is not the case for L. pulchrissimus. The aggregation typically occurs over areas of relatively sparse rabbitbrush, showing that the male aggregation is also unrelated to obtaining resources. Most cases of male aggregation occur in concordance with female aggregation and/or resource density, but neither is the case for L. pulchrissimus.

== Distribution ==
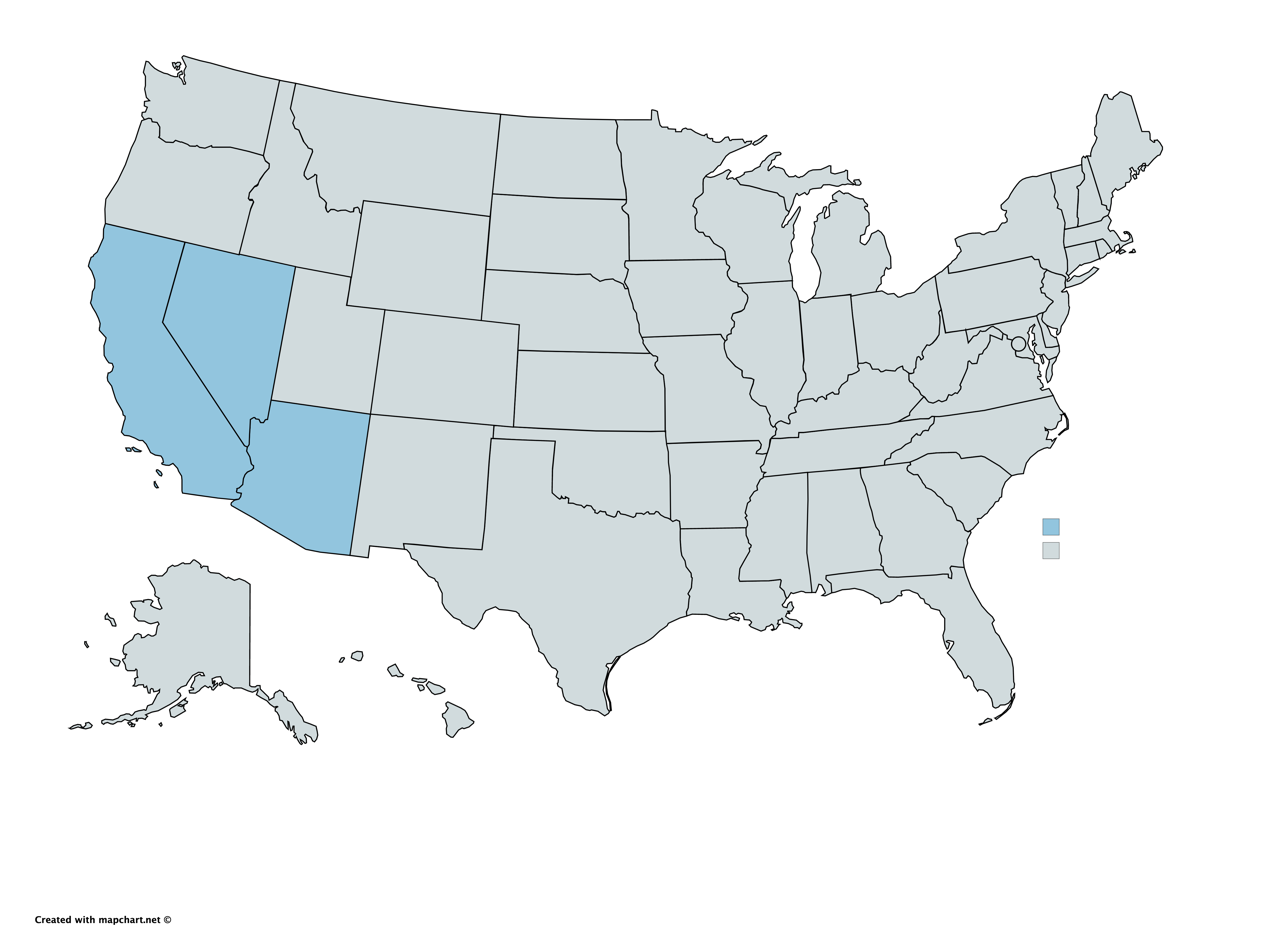
The observed distribution of Lordotus pulchrissimus in the United States.

Lordotus pulchrissimus have been documented in different desert locations throughout southwestern United States and northern Mexico. This includes multiple sites where they have been studied in the wild in California, Arizona, and Nevada. Not much precise information is known about their overall distribution other than what is mentioned about their presence at specific test sites. On average, males emerge first before females. Both sexes emerge over a relatively long proportion of the season.

== Habitat ==
Lordotus pulchrissimus primarily live in arid deserts including the Sonoran Desert and the Mojave Desert. They typically occupy regions of the deserts where they can find brush, their primary source of food. They have also been found to inhabit more temperate regions, including Mono Lake, CA, where multiple studies on the species have been performed.

== Home range and territoriality ==
=== Home range ===
L. pulchrissimus typically stay within a few hundred square meters of sites of male aggregation, unique because males tend to avoid areas of high resource density when aggregating. The males tend to occupy areas very close to their aggregation sites. The home range of females, however, has not been researched, as their recapture in most studies was relatively unsuccessful compared to males. The females tend to migrate away approximately 70 meters each day, and are not guaranteed to return to the spot they were at the previous day.

=== Territoriality ===
Conversely to other species of fly in their areas of inhabitance, L. pulchrissimus males do not typically express territoriality over a single brush bush. L. pulchrissimus males, instead, spend approximately 1.5 hours each day aggregating about 20 meters in the air above areas of brush. However, during these aggregations, the males vigorously defend their territory and engage in aggressive behavior while in their aggregation clouds.

=== Population structure ===
The population density of female L. pulchrissimus is higher than the population density of male L. pulchrissimus. Males typically are found at a population density of 2-5 males per hectare. For females, the distribution of ages is biased towards younger females as they typically leave the group after mating. Females live approximately 10–14 days. Less information is given on male population structure, as the study focused more on the presence and absence of females.

== Food Resources ==
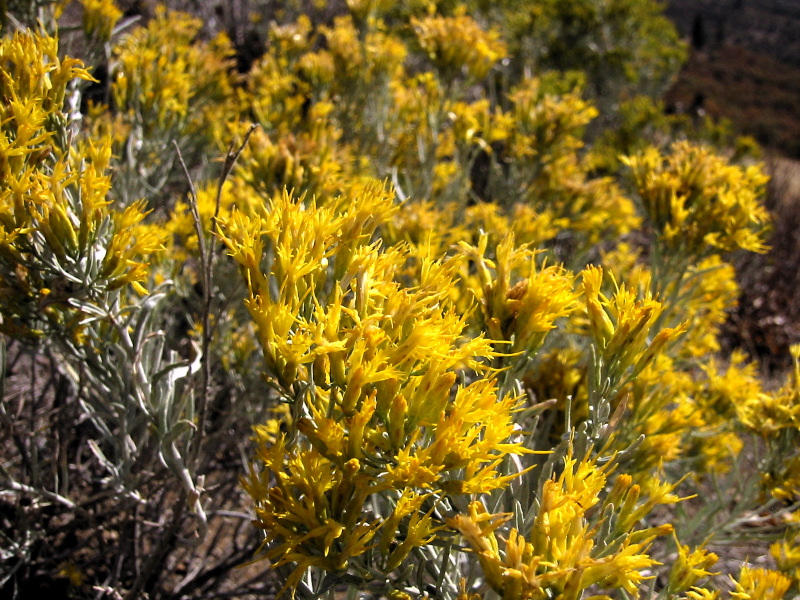
Chrysothamnus nauseosus

=== Larval diet ===
L. pulchrissimus larvae feed on the flesh and eggs of other insects. The specific insects they feed on are currently unknown.

==== Parasitism ====
Bee fly larvae often parasitize the immature stages of other insects for sustenance. Bee fly larvae are parasitoids which take extreme advantage of their hosts, often feeding on them or their eggs.

=== Adult diet ===
Adult L. pulchrissimus feed mostly on desert brush.

In one of the primary sites of L. pulchrissimus research in Mono Lake, CA, the adult diet consists almost entirely on Chrysothamnus nauseosus or rabbitbrush, a flowering perennial shrub that attracts many different types of pollinating insects. L. pulchrissimus allocate more of their time to feeding than is common for fly species, converse to the concept that they should be foraging-time minimizers. The reason for this is not yet researched.

== Mating ==
Female L. pulchrissimus mate within three days of their emergence into the colony in early August. Observations on their behavior suggests they mate as soon as they can and only once. They typically copulate for 5–10 minutes. L. pulchrissimus tends to exhibit a weak tendency towards size-assortive mating, in which females and males of similar sizes copulate. It is likely that female L. pulchrissimus have little choice in their mate, meaning most of the sexual dimorphism occurs as a result of intrasexual selection.

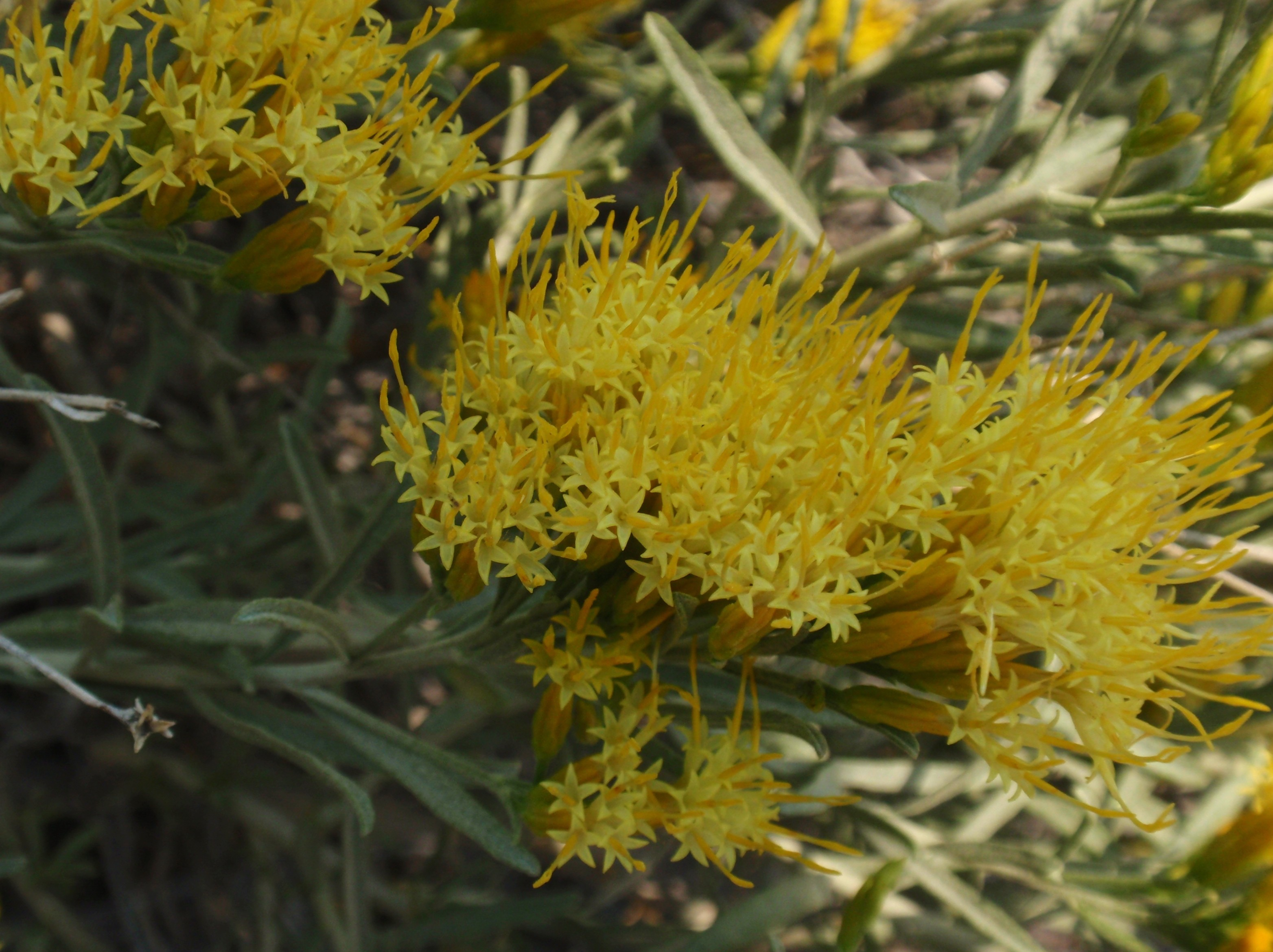
Rabbitbrush

== Mutualism ==
=== Rabbitbrush ===
L. pulchrissimus have a mutualistic relationship with rabbitbrush. The flies feed on its nectar and pollinate the brush in the process.
