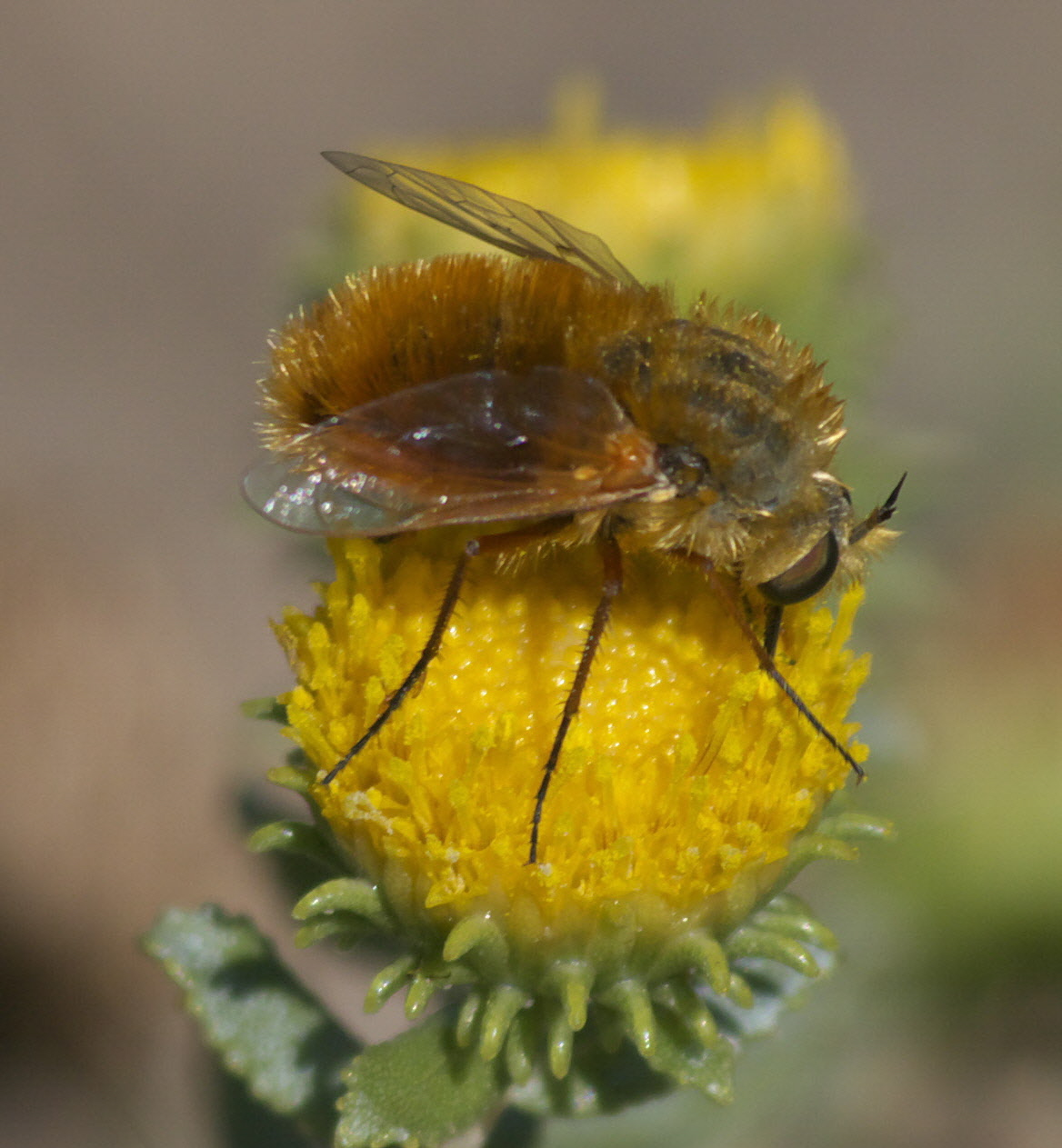
- Lordotus sp.

Scientific classification
- Domain: Eukaryota
- Kingdom: Animalia
- Phylum: Arthropoda
- Class: Insecta
- Order: Diptera
- Family: Bombyliidae
- Subfamily: Lordotinae
- Genus: Lordotus; Loew, 1863

Synonyms
- Adelidea Marquart, 1840

= Lordotus =

Genus of flies

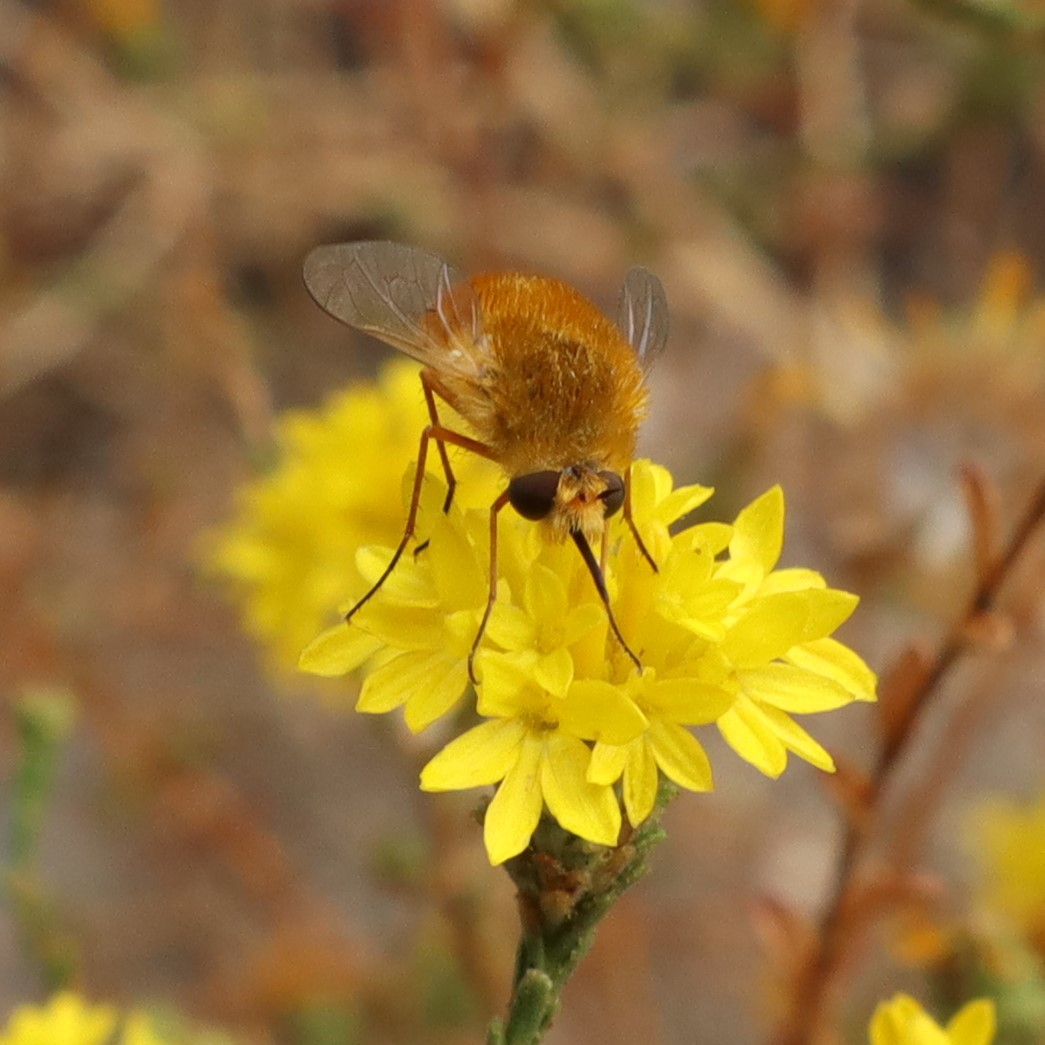
Lordotus

Lordotus is a North American genus of bee flies in the family Bombyliidae. There are about 30 described species in Lordotus.

== Species ==
These 29 species belong to the genus Lordotus:

- Lordotus abdominalis Johnson and Johnson, 1959^{i c g}
- Lordotus albidus Hall, 1954^{i c g}
- Lordotus apicula Coquillett, 1887^{i c g}
- Lordotus arizonensis Johnson and Johnson, 1959^{i c g}
- Lordotus arnaudi Johnson and Johnson, 1959^{i c g}
- Lordotus bipartitus Painter, 1940^{i c g}
- Lordotus bucerus Coquillett, 1894^{i c g}
- Lordotus cingulatus Johnson and Johnson, 1959^{i c g}
- Lordotus diplasus Hall, 1954^{i c g}
- Lordotus diversus Coquillett, 1891^{i c g}
- Lordotus divisus Cresson, 1919^{i c g b}
- Lordotus ermae Hall, 1952^{i c g}
- Lordotus gibbus Loew, 1863^{i c g b}
- Lordotus hurdi Hall, 1957^{i c g}
- Lordotus junceus Coquillett, 1891^{i c g b}
- Lordotus lineatus Johnson & Johnson, 1959^{c g}
- Lordotus luteolus Hall, 1954^{i c g}
- Lordotus lutescens Johnson and Johnson, 1959^{i c g}
- Lordotus miscellus Coquillett, 1887^{i c g}
- Lordotus nevadensis Hall and Evenhuis, 1982^{i c g}
- Lordotus perplexus Johnson and Johnson, 1959^{i c g}
- Lordotus planus Osten Sacken, 1877^{i c g b}
- Lordotus puella Williston, 1893^{i c g}
- Lordotus pulchrissimus Williston, 1893^{i c g b}
- Lordotus rufotibialis Johnson and Johnson, 1959^{i c g}
- Lordotus schlingeri Hall and Evenhuis, 1982^{i c g}
- Lordotus sororculus Williston, 1893^{i c g}
- Lordotus striatus Painter, 1940^{i c g b}
- Lordotus zona Coquillett, 1887^{i c g b}

Data sources: i = ITIS, c = Catalogue of Life, g = GBIF, b = Bugguide.net
