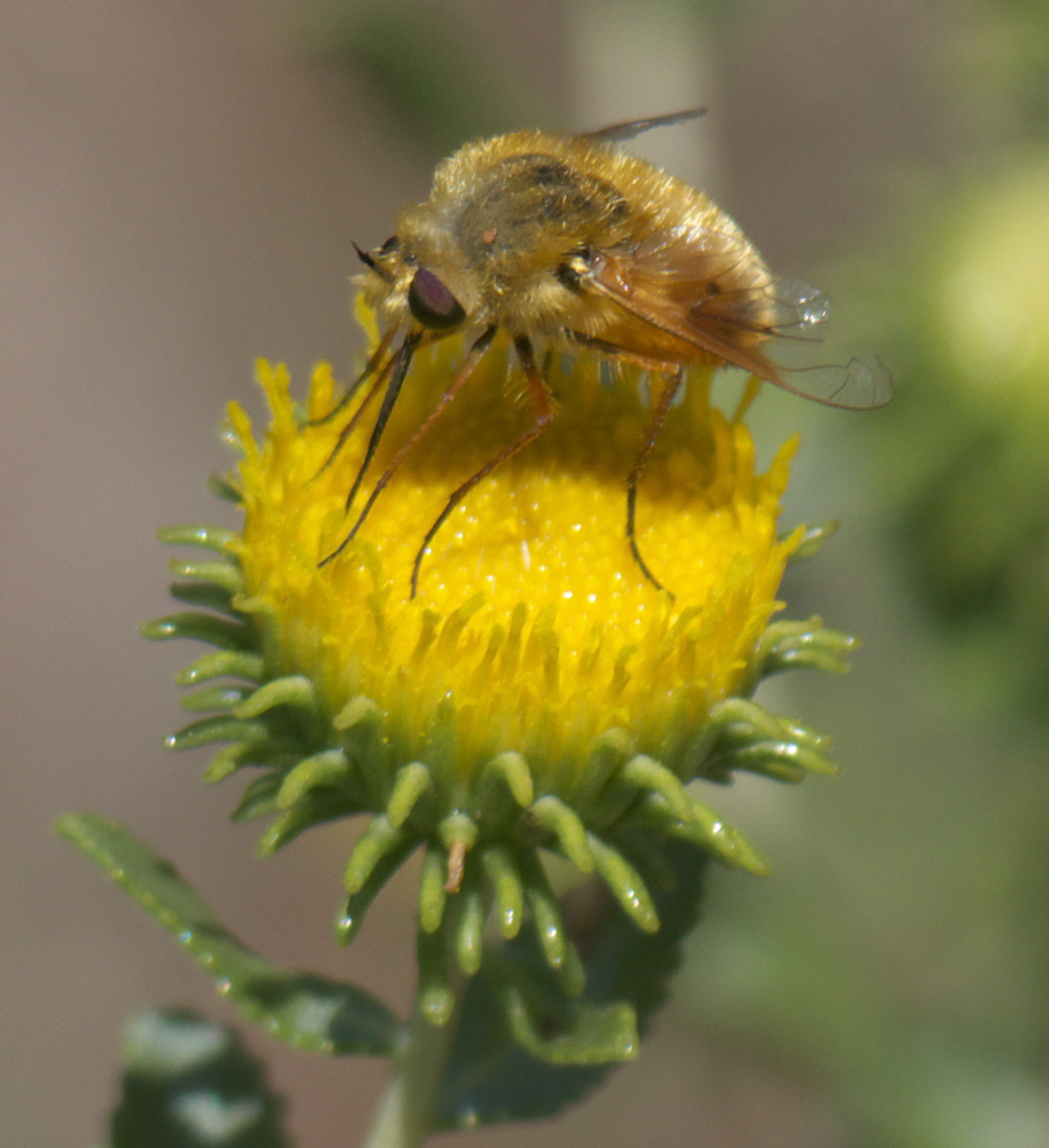
- Lordotus

Scientific classification
- Domain: Eukaryota
- Kingdom: Animalia
- Phylum: Arthropoda
- Class: Insecta
- Order: Diptera
- Family: Bombyliidae
- Subfamily: Lordotinae; Yeates (1994)

= Lordotinae =

Subfamily of flies

Lordotinae is a small subfamily of bee flies in the family Bombyliidae. This subfamily was formerly considered a tribe of Bombyliinae, but was elevated to subfamily as a result of research published in 2019.

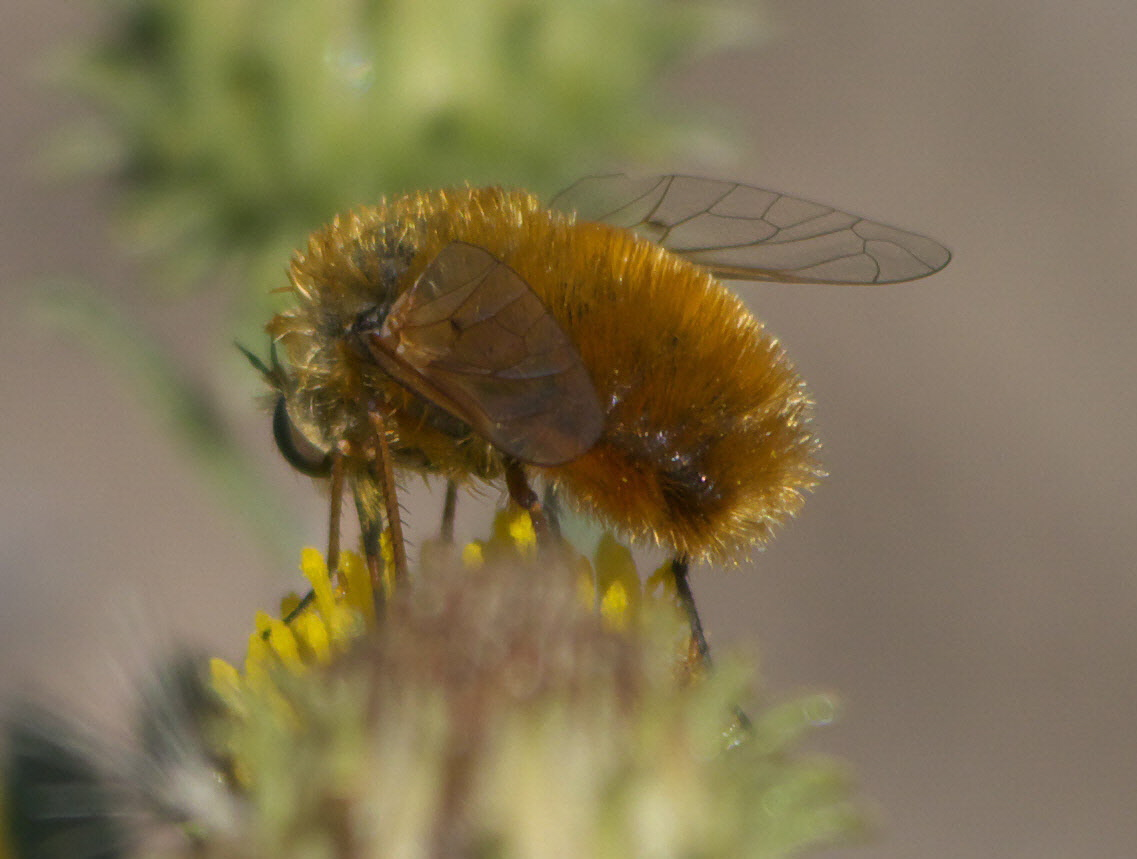
Lordotus

== Genera ==
These three genera belong to the subfamily Lordotinae:

- Geminaria Coquillett, 1894
- Lordotus Loew, 1863
- Othniomyia Hesse, 1938
