= Conophorus fenestratus =

Scientific classification
- Domain: Eukaryota
- Kingdom: Animalia
- Phylum: Arthropoda
- Class: Insecta
- Order: Diptera
- Family: Bombyliidae
- Tribe: Conophorini
- Genus: Conophorus
- Species: C. fenestratus

Binomial name
- Conophorus fenestratus (Osten Sacken, 1877)

Synonyms
- Ploas fenestrata Osten Sacken, 1877

Species of fly

Conophorus fenestratus, or the net-veined bee fly, is a species of bee fly in the family Bombyliidae. It is found in the western United States from Washington to Arizona and in Baja California Sur, Mexico. Its wings are transparent with a black veined pattern.
