= Conophorus sackenii =

Scientific classification
- Domain: Eukaryota
- Kingdom: Animalia
- Phylum: Arthropoda
- Class: Insecta
- Order: Diptera
- Family: Bombyliidae
- Tribe: Conophorini
- Genus: Conophorus
- Species: C. sackenii

Binomial name
- Conophorus sackenii Johnson & Maughan, 1953

Species of fly

Conophorus sackenii is a species of bee fly in the family Bombyliidae. It is found in western Canada from British Columbia to Saskatchewan, and in the United States south to California and Colorado.
