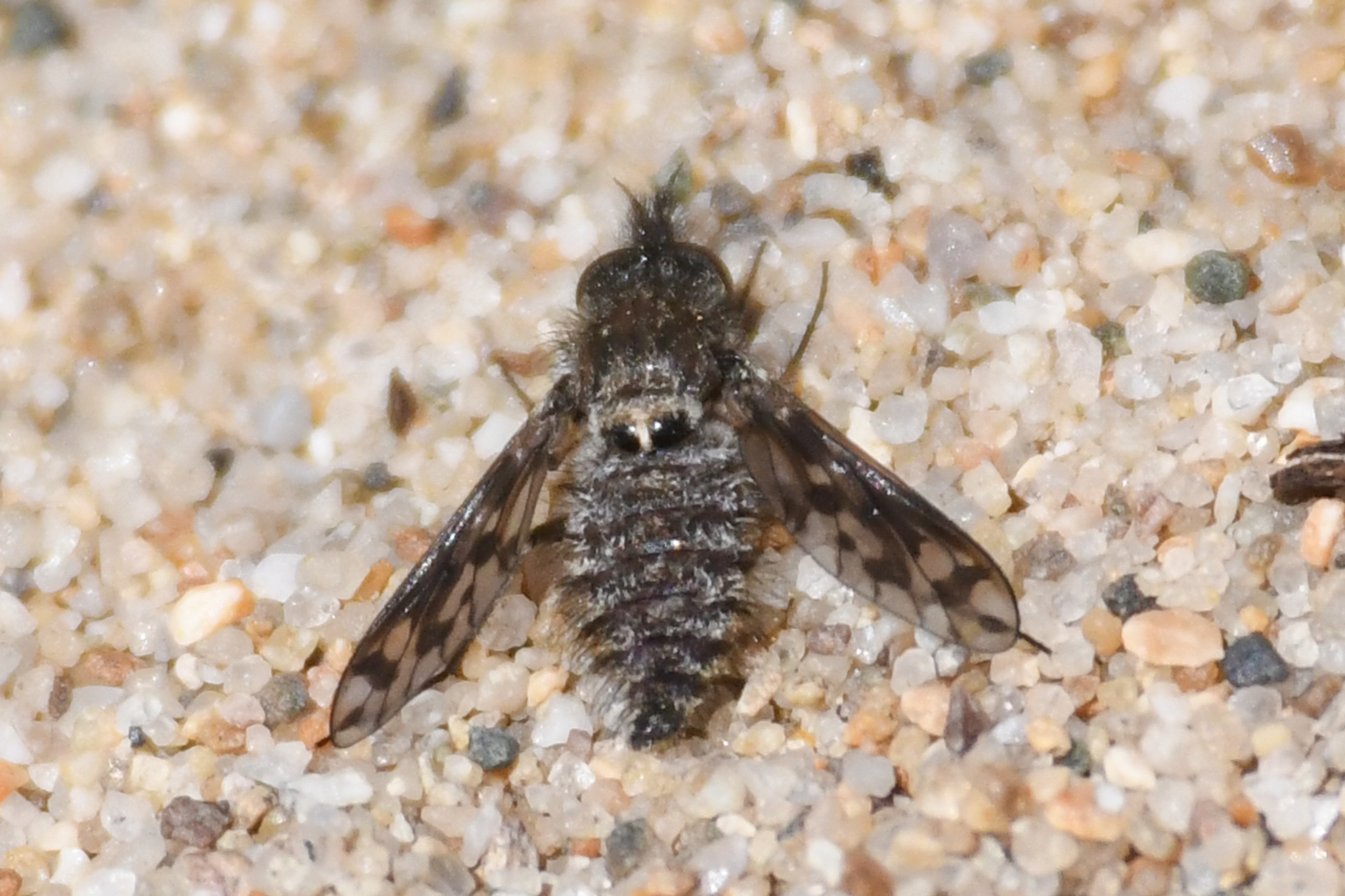

Scientific classification
- Domain: Eukaryota
- Kingdom: Animalia
- Phylum: Arthropoda
- Class: Insecta
- Order: Diptera
- Family: Bombyliidae
- Tribe: Conophorini
- Genus: Conophorus
- Species: C. collini

Binomial name
- Conophorus collini Priddy, 1958

= Conophorus collini =

Species of fly

Conophorus collini is a species of bee fly in the family Bombyliidae.
