= Conophorus cristatus =

Scientific classification
- Domain: Eukaryota
- Kingdom: Animalia
- Phylum: Arthropoda
- Class: Insecta
- Order: Diptera
- Family: Bombyliidae
- Tribe: Conophorini
- Genus: Conophorus
- Species: C. cristatus

Binomial name
- Conophorus cristatus Painter, 1940

Species of fly

Conophorus cristatus is a species of bee fly in the family Bombyliidae.
