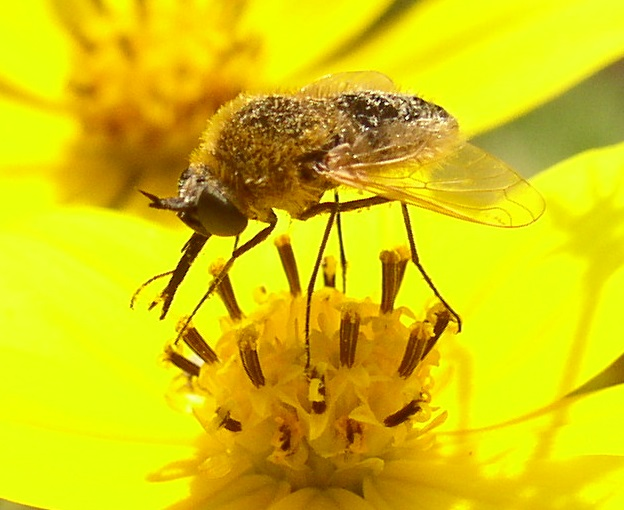

Scientific classification
- Domain: Eukaryota
- Kingdom: Animalia
- Phylum: Arthropoda
- Class: Insecta
- Order: Diptera
- Family: Bombyliidae
- Tribe: Conophorini
- Genus: Sparnopolius
- Species: S. confusus

Binomial name
- Sparnopolius confusus (Wiedemann, 1824)

Synonyms
- Bombylius brevirostris Macquart, 1840; Bombylius confusus Wiedemann, 1824; Bombylius fulvus Wiedemann, 1821; Bombylius lherminierii Macquart, 1840; Dischistus aurifluus Bezzi, 1924; Dischistus fuscipes Bigot, 1892; Sparnopolius cumatilis Grote, 1867

= Sparnopolius confusus =

Species of fly

Sparnopolius confusus is a species of bee flies, insects in the family Bombyliidae.

It measures 6–9 mm. It is found in most of the United States and in part of Mexico. It is known to be a parasitoid of June beetles, Phyllophaga
