= Conophorus nigripennis =

Scientific classification
- Domain: Eukaryota
- Kingdom: Animalia
- Phylum: Arthropoda
- Class: Insecta
- Order: Diptera
- Family: Bombyliidae
- Tribe: Conophorini
- Genus: Conophorus
- Species: C. nigripennis

Binomial name
- Conophorus nigripennis (Loew, 1872)

Synonyms
- Ploas nigripennis Loew, 1872

Species of fly

Conophorus nigripennis is a species of bee fly in the family Bombyliidae. It is found in the western United States from Arizona to Washington, and north to British Columbia, Canada.
