= Conophorus obesulus =

Scientific classification
- Domain: Eukaryota
- Kingdom: Animalia
- Phylum: Arthropoda
- Class: Insecta
- Order: Diptera
- Family: Bombyliidae
- Tribe: Conophorini
- Genus: Conophorus
- Species: C. obesulus

Binomial name
- Conophorus obesulus (Loew, 1872)

Synonyms
- Ploas amabilis Osten Sacken, 1877; Ploas obesula Loew, 1872

Species of fly

Conophorus obesulus is a species of bee fly in the family Bombyliidae. It is found in the western United States from California to Colorado, and north to British Columbia, Canada.
