= Conophorus atratulus =

Scientific classification
- Domain: Eukaryota
- Kingdom: Animalia
- Phylum: Arthropoda
- Class: Insecta
- Order: Diptera
- Family: Bombyliidae
- Tribe: Conophorini
- Genus: Conophorus
- Species: C. atratulus

Binomial name
- Conophorus atratulus (Loew, 1872)

Synonyms
- Ploas atratula Loew, 1872

Species of fly

Conophorus atratulus is a species of bee fly in the family Bombyliidae.
