= Conophorus fallax =

Scientific classification
- Domain: Eukaryota
- Kingdom: Animalia
- Phylum: Arthropoda
- Class: Insecta
- Order: Diptera
- Family: Bombyliidae
- Tribe: Conophorini
- Genus: Conophorus
- Species: C. fallax

Binomial name
- Conophorus fallax (Greene, 1921)

Synonyms
- Calopelta fallax Greene, 1921

Species of fly

Conophorus fallax is a species of bee fly in the family Bombyliidae. It is found in North America, from the Yukon to Saskatchewan in Canada south to New Mexico and California in the United States.
