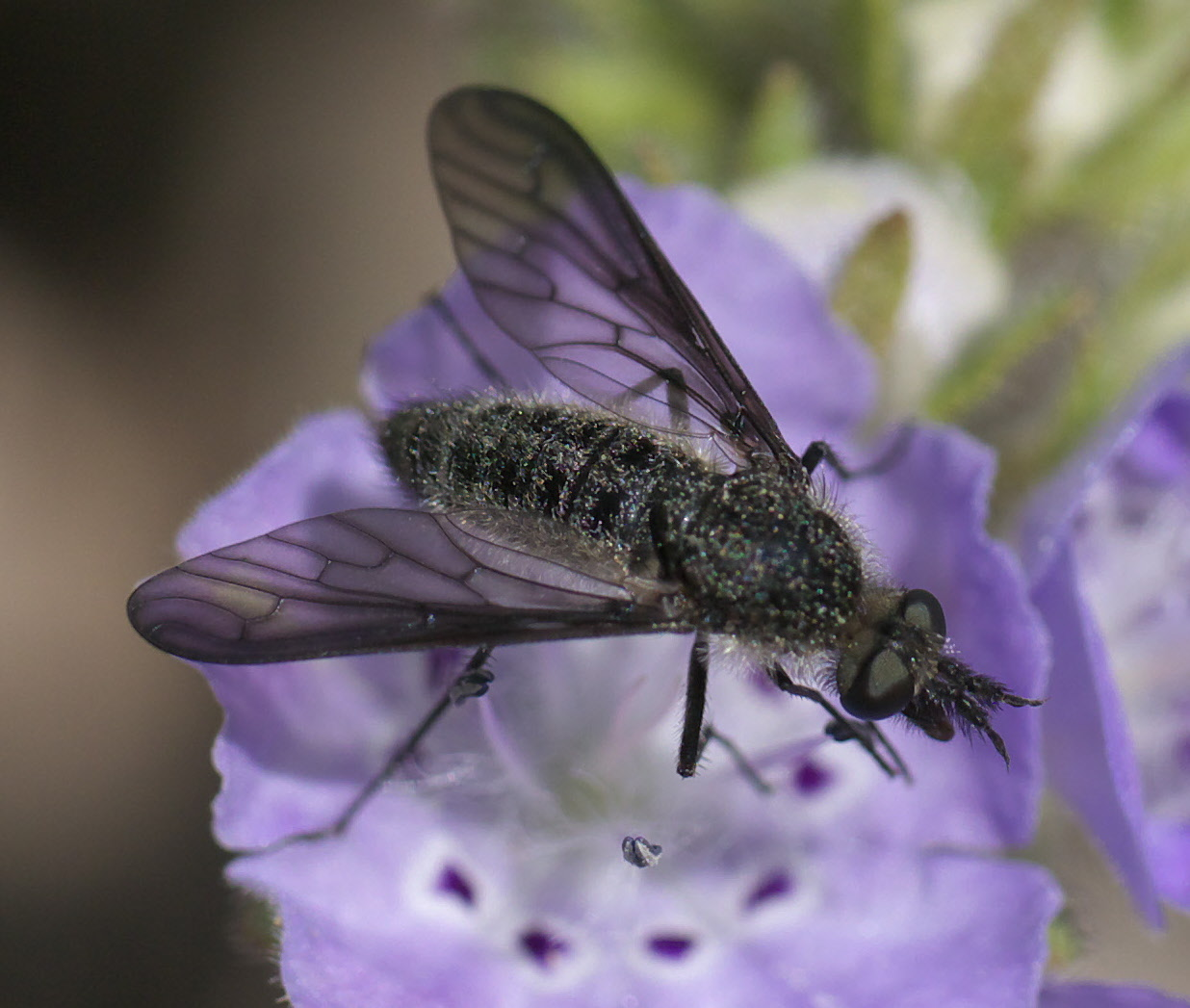
- Aldrichia ehrmanii

Scientific classification
- Kingdom: Animalia
- Phylum: Arthropoda
- Class: Insecta
- Order: Diptera
- Family: Bombyliidae
- Subfamily: Bombyliinae
- Tribe: Conophorini
- Genus: Aldrichia; Coquillett, 1894

= Aldrichia =

Genus of flies

Aldrichia is a North American genus of bee flies in the family Bombyliidae. The genus contains two described species.

== Species ==
These two species belong to the genus Aldrichia:

- A. auripuncta Painter, 1940
- A. ehrmanii Coquillett, 1894
