= Aldrichia auripuncta =

Scientific classification
- Kingdom: Animalia
- Phylum: Arthropoda
- Clade: Pancrustacea
- Class: Insecta
- Order: Diptera
- Family: Bombyliidae
- Genus: Aldrichia
- Species: A. auripuncta

Binomial name
- Aldrichia auripuncta Coquillett, 1940

Species of fly

Aldrichia auripuncta is a species of bee fly in the family Bombyliidae. It is found in the northeastern United States.
