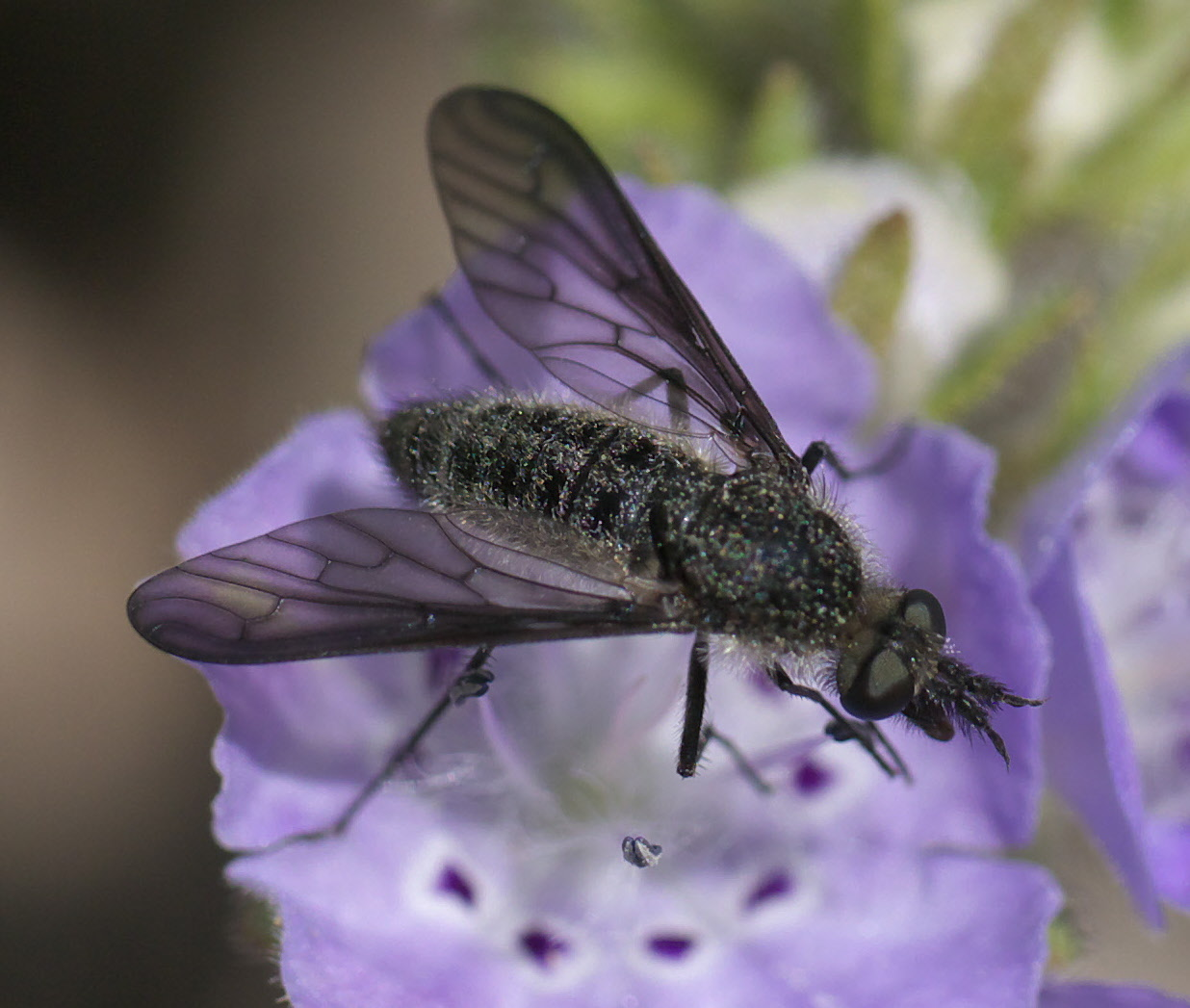

Scientific classification
- Kingdom: Animalia
- Phylum: Arthropoda
- Clade: Pancrustacea
- Class: Insecta
- Order: Diptera
- Family: Bombyliidae
- Tribe: Conophorini
- Genus: Aldrichia
- Species: A. ehrmanii

Binomial name
- Aldrichia ehrmanii Coquillett, 1894

= Aldrichia ehrmanii =

Species of fly

Aldrichia ehrmanii is a species of bee fly in the family Bombyliidae. It is found in the northeastern United States and Ontario, Canada.
