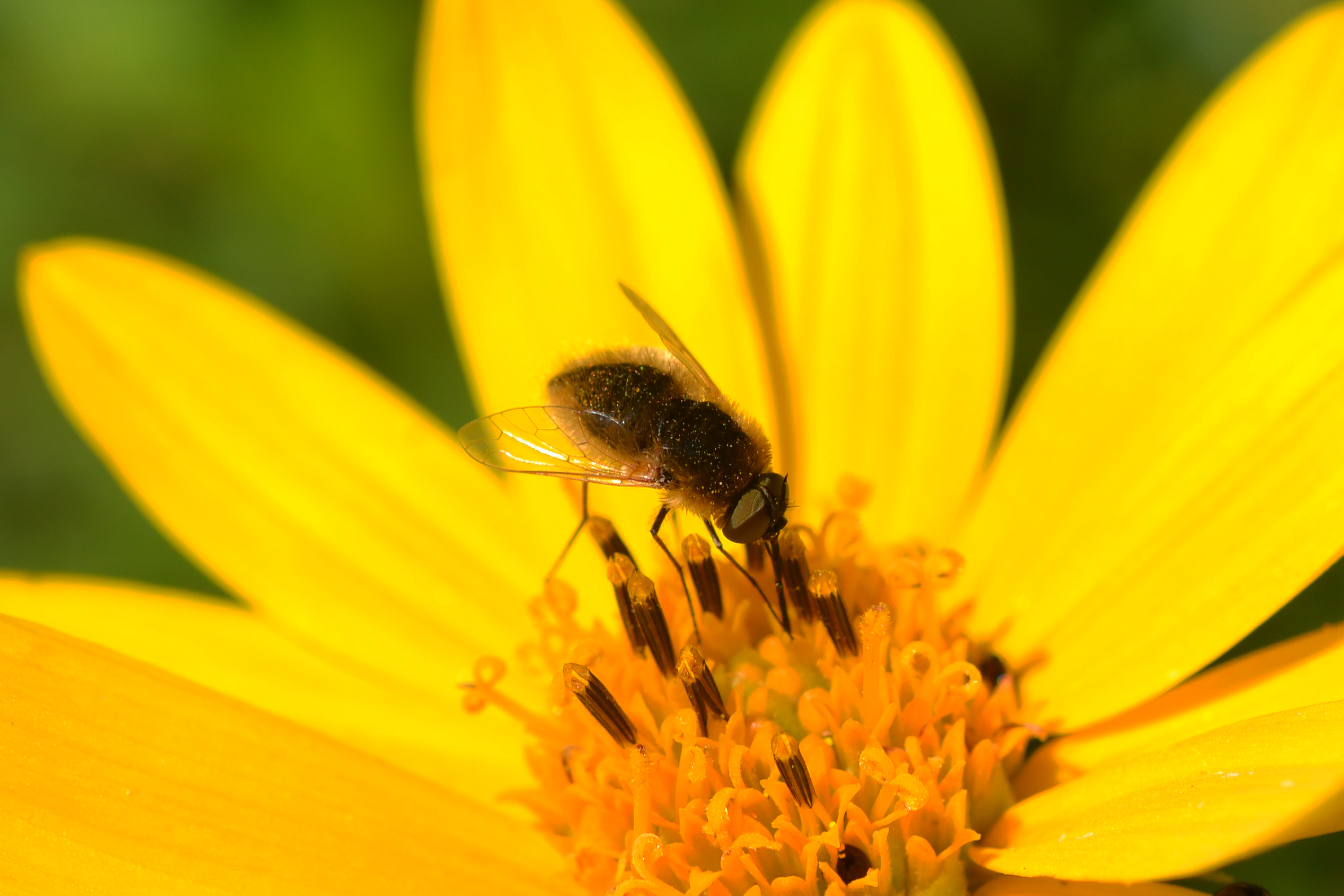
- Sparnopolius confusus

Scientific classification
- Domain: Eukaryota
- Kingdom: Animalia
- Phylum: Arthropoda
- Class: Insecta
- Order: Diptera
- Family: Bombyliidae
- Subfamily: Bombyliinae
- Tribe: Conophorini
- Genus: Sparnopolius; Loew, 1855

= Sparnopolius =

Genus of bee flies

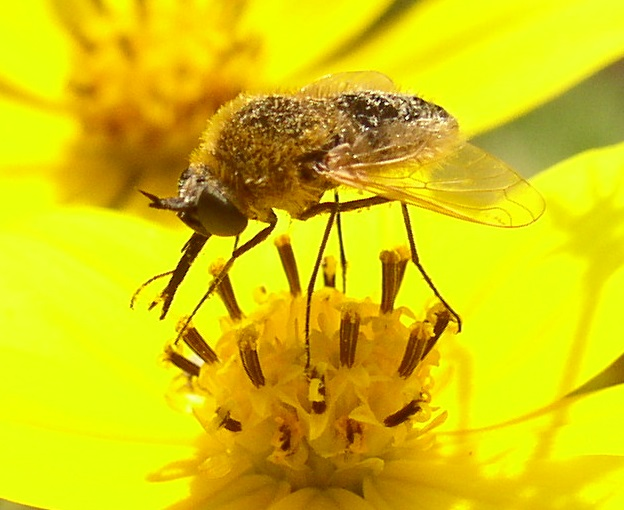
Female Sparnopolius confusus

Sparnopolius is a genus of bee flies in the family Bombyliidae. There are about 17 described species in Sparnopolius.

== Species ==
These 17 species belong to the genus Sparnopolius:

- Sparnopolius anomalus (Painter, 1940)^{i c g}
- Sparnopolius cockerelli (Hesse, 1938)^{c g}
- Sparnopolius coloradensis Grote, 1867^{i c g}
- Sparnopolius confusus (Wiedemann, 1824)^{i c g b}
- Sparnopolius distinctus (Walker, 1852)^{c g}
- Sparnopolius diversus Williston, 1901^{i c g}
- Sparnopolius heteropterus (Macquart, 1840)^{c}
- Sparnopolius hyalinus (Fabricius, 1805)^{c g}
- Sparnopolius hyalipennis (Macquart, 1846)^{c}
- Sparnopolius inornatus (Walker, 1849)^{c g}
- Sparnopolius karasanus (Hesse, 1938)^{c}
- Sparnopolius leucopygus (Wulp, 1885)^{c g}
- Sparnopolius megacephalus (Portschinsky, 1887)^{c g}
- Sparnopolius nigracinctus (Roberts, 1929)^{c g}
- Sparnopolius ochrobasis Hall and Evenhuis, 1982^{i c g}
- Sparnopolius permixtus (Hesse, 1938)^{c g}
- Sparnopolius teniurostris (Roberts, 1928)^{c g}

Data sources: i = ITIS, c = Catalogue of Life, g = GBIF, b = Bugguide.net
