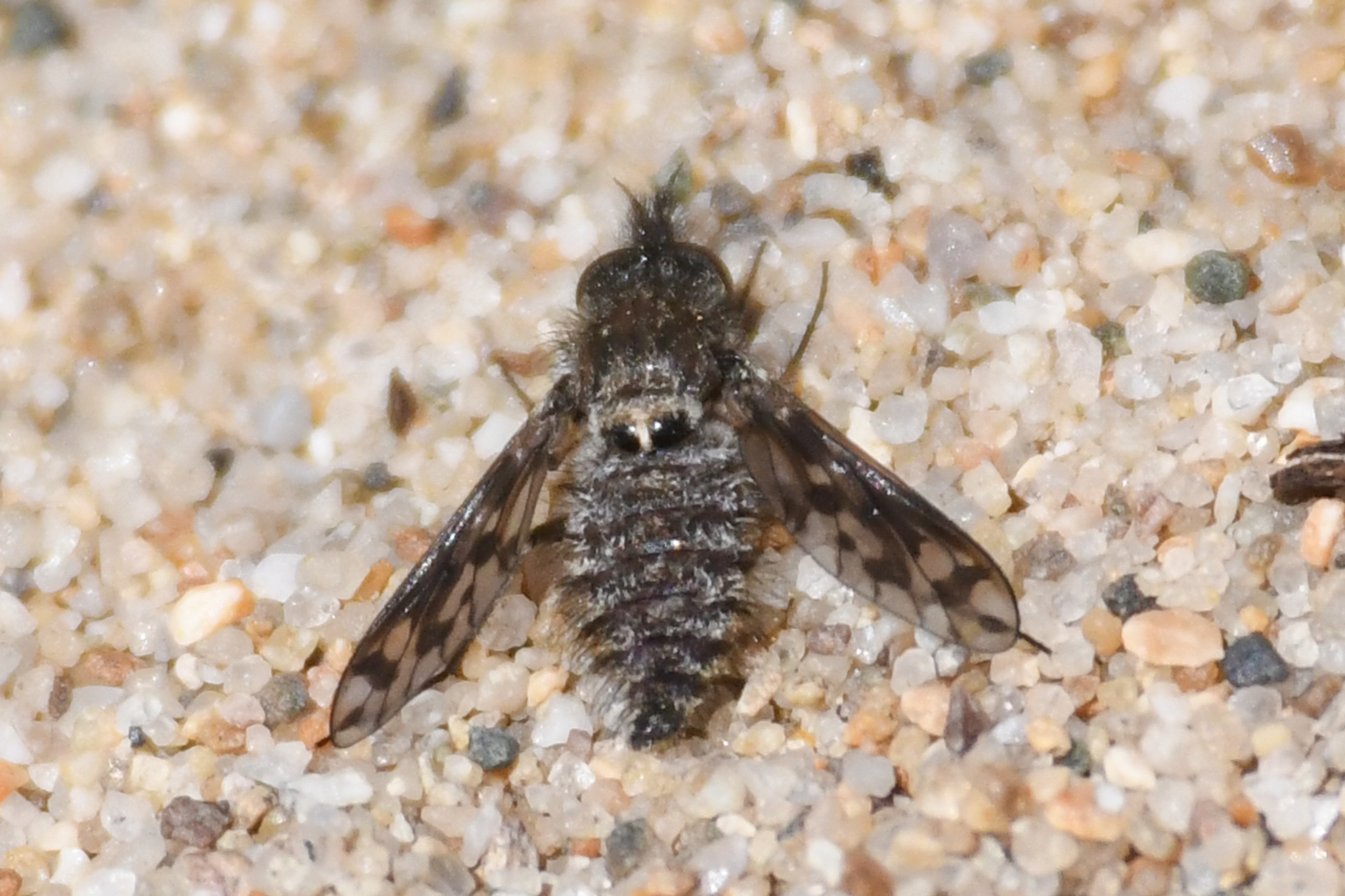
- Conophorus collini

Scientific classification
- Kingdom: Animalia
- Phylum: Arthropoda
- Class: Insecta
- Order: Diptera
- Family: Bombyliidae
- Subfamily: Bombyliinae
- Tribe: Conophorini
- Genus: Conophorus; Meigen, 1803

= Conophorus =

Genus of flies

Conophorus is a genus of bee flies in the family Bombyliidae. There are at least 16 described species in Conophorus in the United States, and 67 total worldwide.

== Species ==
- C. atratulus (Loew, 1872)
- C. auratus Priddy, 1954
- C. chinooki Priddy, 1954
- C. collini Priddy, 1958
- C. columbiensis Priddy, 1954
- C. cristatus Painter, 1940
- C. fallax (Greene, 1921)
- C. fenestratus (Osten Sacken, 1877)
- C. hiltoni Priddy, 1958
- C. limbatus (Loew, 1869)
- C. melanoceratus Bigot, 1892
- C. nigripennis (Loew, 1872)
- C. obesulus (Loew, 1872)
- C. painteri Priddy, 1958
- C. rufulus (Osten Sacken, 1877)
- C. sackenii Johnson & Maughan, 1953
- C. virescens Fabricius, 1789
