= Conophorus melanoceratus =

Scientific classification
- Kingdom: Animalia
- Phylum: Arthropoda
- Class: Insecta
- Order: Diptera
- Family: Bombyliidae
- Genus: Conophorus
- Species: C. melanoceratus

Binomial name
- Conophorus melanoceratus Bigot, 1892

Synonyms
- Ploas serrata Coquillett, 1894

Species of fly

Conophorus melanoceratus is a species of bee fly in the family Bombyliidae.
