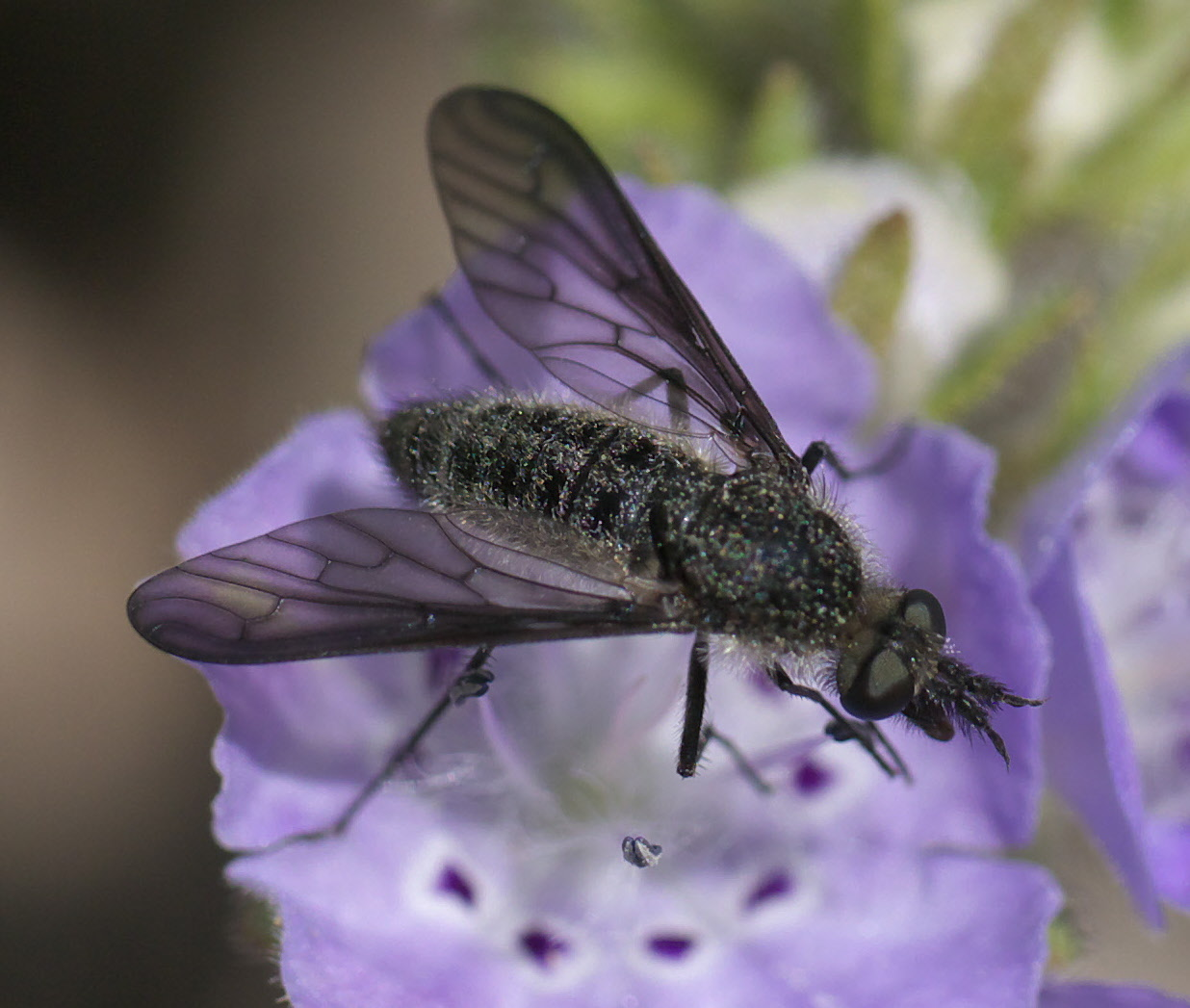
- Aldrichia ehrmanii

Scientific classification
- Domain: Eukaryota
- Kingdom: Animalia
- Phylum: Arthropoda
- Class: Insecta
- Order: Diptera
- Family: Bombyliidae
- Subfamily: Bombyliinae
- Tribe: Conophorini

= Conophorini =

Tribe of flies

Conophorini is a tribe of bee flies in the family Bombyliidae.

== Genera ==
These four genera belong to the tribe Conophorini:

- Aldrichia Coquillett, 1894
- Conophorina Becker, 1920
- Conophorus Meigen, 1803
- Sparnopolius Loew, 1855
