= List of Systoechus species =

This is a list of 121 species in Systoechus, a genus of bee flies in the family Bombyliidae.

== Systoechus species ==
- Systoechus aberrans Hesse, 1938^{c g}
- Systoechus acridophagus Hesse, 1938^{c g}
- Systoechus affinis Hesse, 1938^{c g}
- Systoechus albicans (Macquart, 1846)^{c g}
- Systoechus albidus Loew, 1860^{c g}
- Systoechus albipectus Hesse, 1938^{c g}
- Systoechus altivolans Hesse, 1938^{c g}
- Systoechus anthophilus Hesse, 1938^{c g}
- Systoechus arabicus Greathead, 1980^{c g}
- Systoechus argyroleucus Hesse, 1938^{c g}
- Systoechus argyropogonus Hesse, 1938^{c g}
- Systoechus atriceps Bowden, 1964^{c g}
- Systoechus audax Greathead, 1967^{c g}
- Systoechus aureus Hesse, 1938^{c g}
- Systoechus auricomatus Bowden, 1959^{c g}
- Systoechus aurifacies Greathead, 1958^{c g}
- Systoechus auripilus Hesse, 1938^{c g}
- Systoechus aurulentus (Wiedemann, 1820)^{c g}
- Systoechus austeni Bezzi, 1924^{c g}
- Systoechus autumanalis (Pallas & Wiedemann, 1818)^{c g}
- Systoechus autumnalis Becker, 1910^{c g}
- Systoechus badipennis Hesse, 1938^{c g}
- Systoechus badius Hesse, 1938^{c g}
- Systoechus bombycinus Hesse, 1938^{c g}
- Systoechus brunnibasis Hesse, 1938^{c g}
- Systoechus brunnipennis (Loew, 1852)^{c g}
- Systoechus candidulus Loew, 1863^{i c g b}
- Systoechus candidus Hesse, 1938^{c g}
- Systoechus canescens Hesse, 1938^{c g}
- Systoechus canicapilis Bowden, 1959^{c g}
- Systoechus canipectus Hesse, 1938^{c g}
- Systoechus canus (Macquart, 1840)^{c g}
- Systoechus castanealis Greathead, 1996^{c g}
- Systoechus cellularis Bowden, 1959^{c g}
- Systoechus chlamydicterus Hesse, 1938^{c g}
- Systoechus chrystallinus Bezzi, 1924^{c g}
- Systoechus claripennis (Macquart, 1840)^{c}
- Systoechus croceipilus Greathead, 1980^{c g}
- Systoechus ctenopterus (Mikan, 1976)^{c g}
- Systoechus damarensis Hesse, 1938^{c g}
- Systoechus deceptus Hesse, 1938^{c g}
- Systoechus eremophilus Hesse, 1936^{c g}
- Systoechus eupogonatus Bigot, 1892^{c g}
- Systoechus exiguus Hesse, 1938^{c g}
- Systoechus exilipes Bezzi, 1923^{c g}
- Systoechus faustus Hesse, 1938^{c g}
- Systoechus flavicapillis Bowden, 1959^{c g}
- Systoechus flavospinosus Brunetti, 1920^{c g}
- Systoechus fuligineus Loew, 1863^{c g}
- Systoechus fumipennis Painter, 1962^{i c g}
- Systoechus fumitinctus Hesse, 1938^{c g}
- Systoechus fusciventris Hesse, 1938^{c g}
- Systoechus goliath Bezzi, 1922^{c g}
- Systoechus gomezmenori Andreu Rubio, 1959^{c g}
- Systoechus gradatus (Wiedemann, 1820)^{c g}
- Systoechus grandis Paramonov, 1940^{c g}
- Systoechus heteropogon Bowden, 1959^{c g}
- Systoechus horridus Greathead, 1980^{c g}
- Systoechus inordinatus Hesse, 1938^{c g}
- Systoechus kalaharicus Hesse, 1936^{c g}
- Systoechus lacus Bowden, 1964^{c g}
- Systoechus laevifrons (Loew, 1855)^{c g}
- Systoechus leoninus Bowden, 1964^{c g}
- Systoechus leucostictus Hesse, 1938^{c g}
- Systoechus lightfooti Hesse, 1938^{c g}
- Systoechus litoralis Bowden, 1964^{c g}
- Systoechus longirostris Becker, 1916^{c g}
- Systoechus lucidus (Loew, 1855)^{c g}
- Systoechus marshalli Paramonov, 1931^{c g}
- Systoechus melanpogon Bezzi, 1912^{c g}
- Systoechus mentiens Bezzi, 1924^{c g}
- Systoechus microcephalus (Loew, 1855)^{c g}
- Systoechus mixtus (Wiedemann, 1821)^{c g}
- Systoechus montanus Hesse, 1938^{c g}
- Systoechus monticolanus Hesse, 1938^{c g}
- Systoechus montuosus Greathead, 1967^{c g}
- Systoechus namaquensis Hesse, 1938^{c g}
- Systoechus neglectus Hesse, 1938^{c g}
- Systoechus nigribarbus (Loew, 1852)^{c g}
- Systoechus nigripes Loew, 1863^{c g}
- Systoechus nivalis Brunetti, 1912^{c g}
- Systoechus niveicomatus Bowden, 1959^{c g}
- Systoechus oreas Osten Sacken, 1877^{i c g b}
- Systoechus pallidipilosus Austen, 1937^{c g}
- Systoechus pallidulus (Walker, 1849)^{c g}
- Systoechus phaeopterus Bezzi, 1924^{c g}
- Systoechus polioleucus Hesse, 1938^{c g}
- Systoechus poweri Hesse, 1938^{c g}
- Systoechus pumilio Becker, 1915^{c g}
- Systoechus pumilo Becker, 1915^{g}
- Systoechus quasiminimus Evenhuis & Greathead, 1999^{c g}
- Systoechus rhodesianus Hesse, 1938^{c g}
- Systoechus robustus Bezzi, 1912^{c g}
- Systoechus rudebecki Hesse, 1955^{c g}
- Systoechus salticola Hesse, 1938^{c g}
- Systoechus scabrirostris Bezzi, 1921^{c g}
- Systoechus scutellaris (Wiedemann, 1828)^{c}
- Systoechus scutellatus (Macquart, 1840)^{c g}
- Systoechus segetus Bowden, 1964^{c g}
- Systoechus silvaticus Hesse, 1938^{c g}
- Systoechus simplex Loew, 1860^{c g}
- Systoechus sinaiticus Efflatoun, 1945^{c g}
- Systoechus socius (Walker, 1852)^{c g}
- Systoechus solitus (Walker, 1849)^{i c b}
- Systoechus somali Oldroyd, 1947^{c g}
- Systoechus spinithorax Bezzi, 1921^{c g}
- Systoechus srilankae Zaitzev, 1988^{c g}
- Systoechus stevensoni Hesse, 1938^{c g}
- Systoechus subcontiguus Hesse, 1938^{c g}
- Systoechus submicans Greathead, 1980^{c g}
- Systoechus subulinus Bowden, 1964^{c g}
- Systoechus tesquorum Becker, 1916^{c g}
- Systoechus titan Greathead, 1996^{c g}
- Systoechus transvaalensis Hesse, 1938^{c g}
- Systoechus tumidifrons Bezzi, 1921^{c g}
- Systoechus ventricosus Bezzi, 1921^{c g}
- Systoechus vulgaris Loew, 1863^{i c g b} (grasshopper bee fly)
- Systoechus vulpinus Becker, 1910^{c g}
- Systoechus waltoni Hesse, 1938^{c g}
- Systoechus xanthoplocamus Francois, 1964^{c g}
- Systoechus xerophilus Hesse, 1938^{c g}

Data sources: i = ITIS, c = Catalogue of Life, g = GBIF, b = Bugguide.net
