= Systoechus oreas =

Scientific classification
- Domain: Eukaryota
- Kingdom: Animalia
- Phylum: Arthropoda
- Class: Insecta
- Order: Diptera
- Family: Bombyliidae
- Tribe: Bombyliini
- Genus: Systoechus
- Species: S. oreas

Binomial name
- Systoechus oreas Osten Sacken, 1877

Species of fly

Systoechus oreas is a species of bee fly in the family Bombyliidae. It is found in British Columbia, Canada and the western United States. Its larvae are predators of grasshopper eggs.
