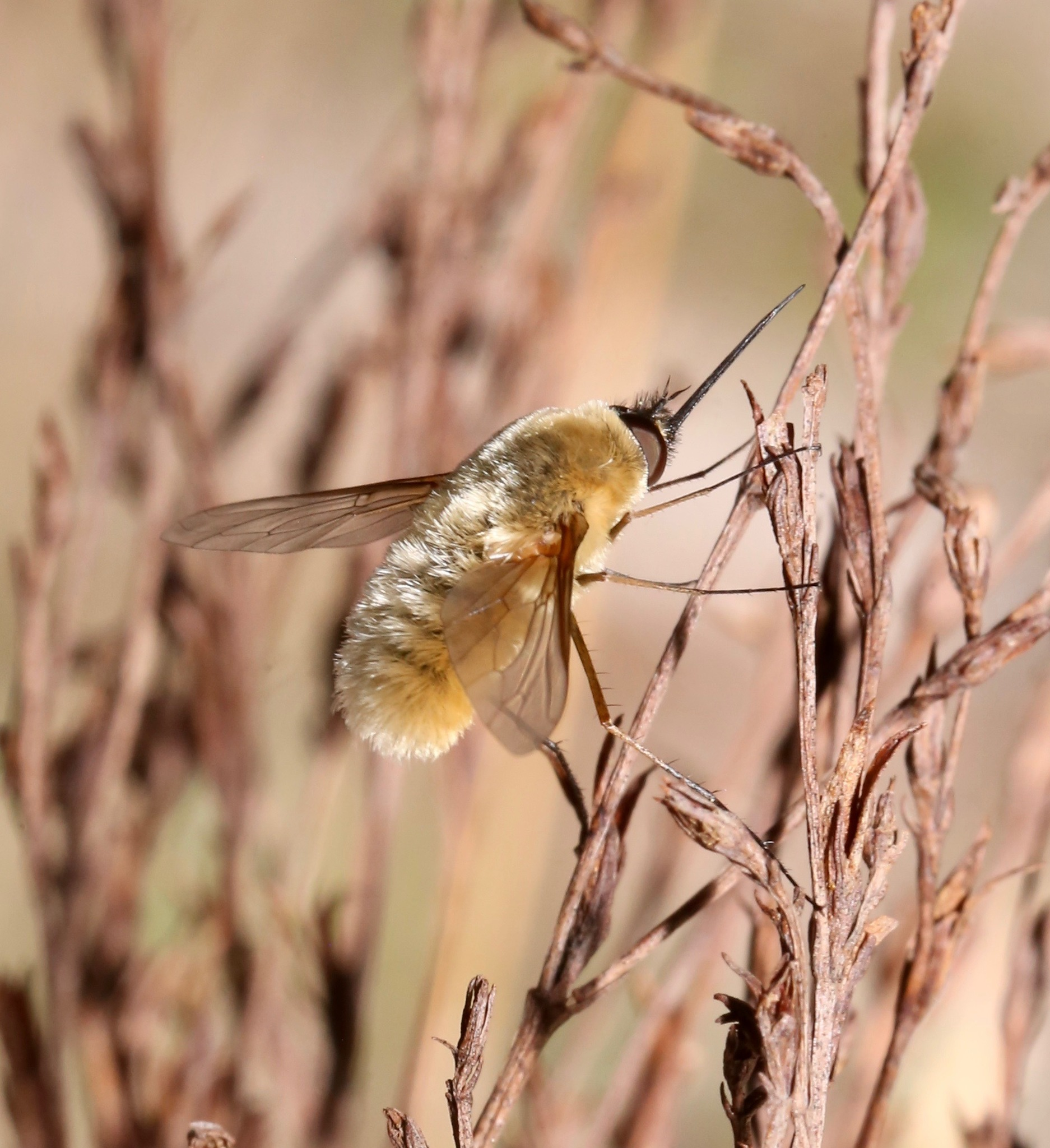
- Systoechus solitus, Florida

Scientific classification
- Kingdom: Animalia
- Phylum: Arthropoda
- Class: Insecta
- Order: Diptera
- Family: Bombyliidae
- Tribe: Bombyliini
- Genus: Systoechus
- Species: S. solitus

Binomial name
- Systoechus solitus (Walker, 1849)

Synonyms
- Bombylius solitus Walker, 1849

= Systoechus solitus =

Species of fly

Systoechus solitus is a species of bee fly in the family Bombyliidae. It is found in the southeastern United States from New Jersey to Florida and Louisiana. Its larvae are predators of grasshopper eggs.
