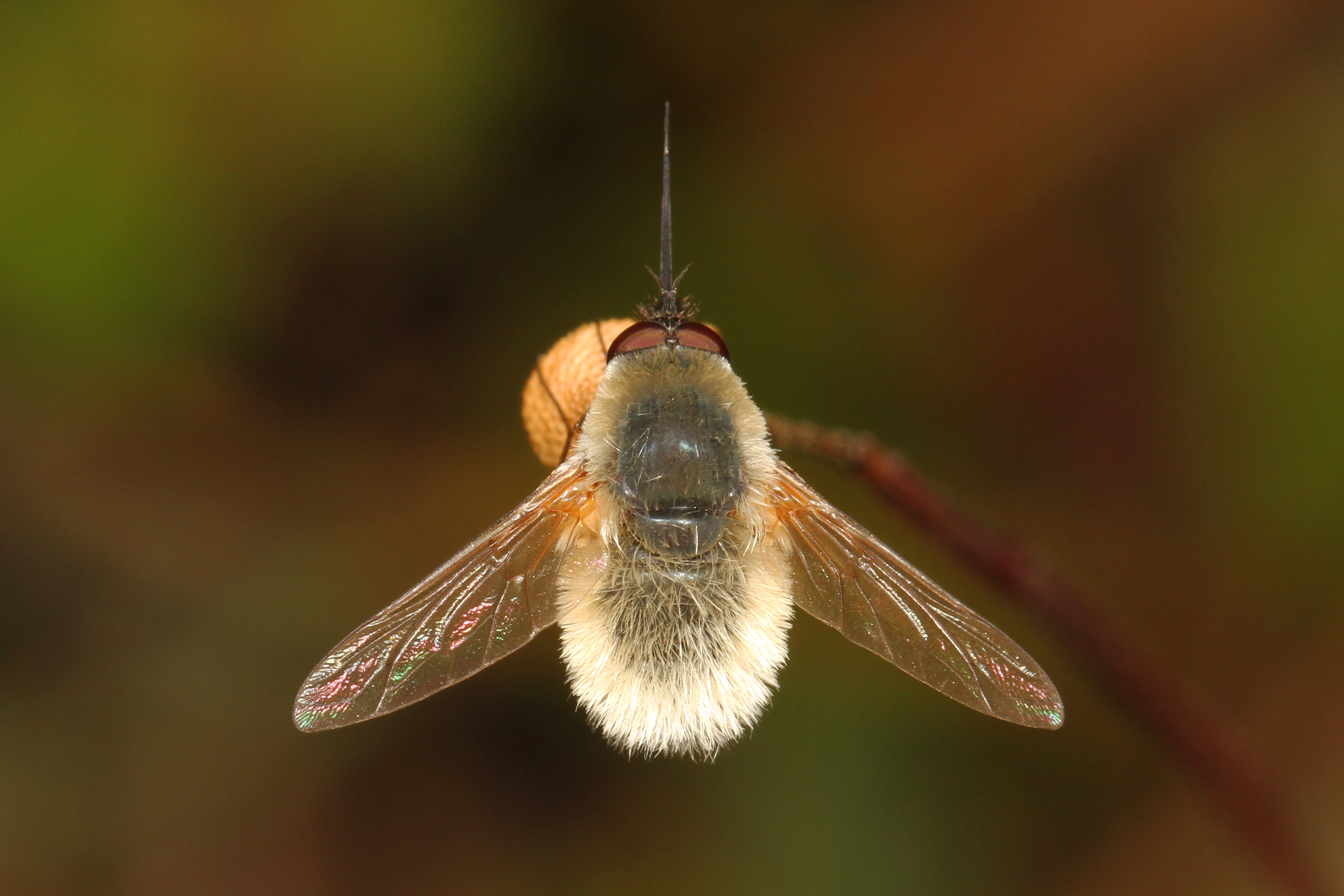

Scientific classification
- Domain: Eukaryota
- Kingdom: Animalia
- Phylum: Arthropoda
- Class: Insecta
- Order: Diptera
- Family: Bombyliidae
- Tribe: Bombyliini
- Genus: Systoechus
- Species: S. candidulus

Binomial name
- Systoechus candidulus Loew, 1863

= Systoechus candidulus =

Species of fly

Systoechus candidulus is a species of bee fly in the family Bombyliidae. It is found in Ontario, Canada, and across most of the United States. Its larvae are predators of grasshopper eggs.
