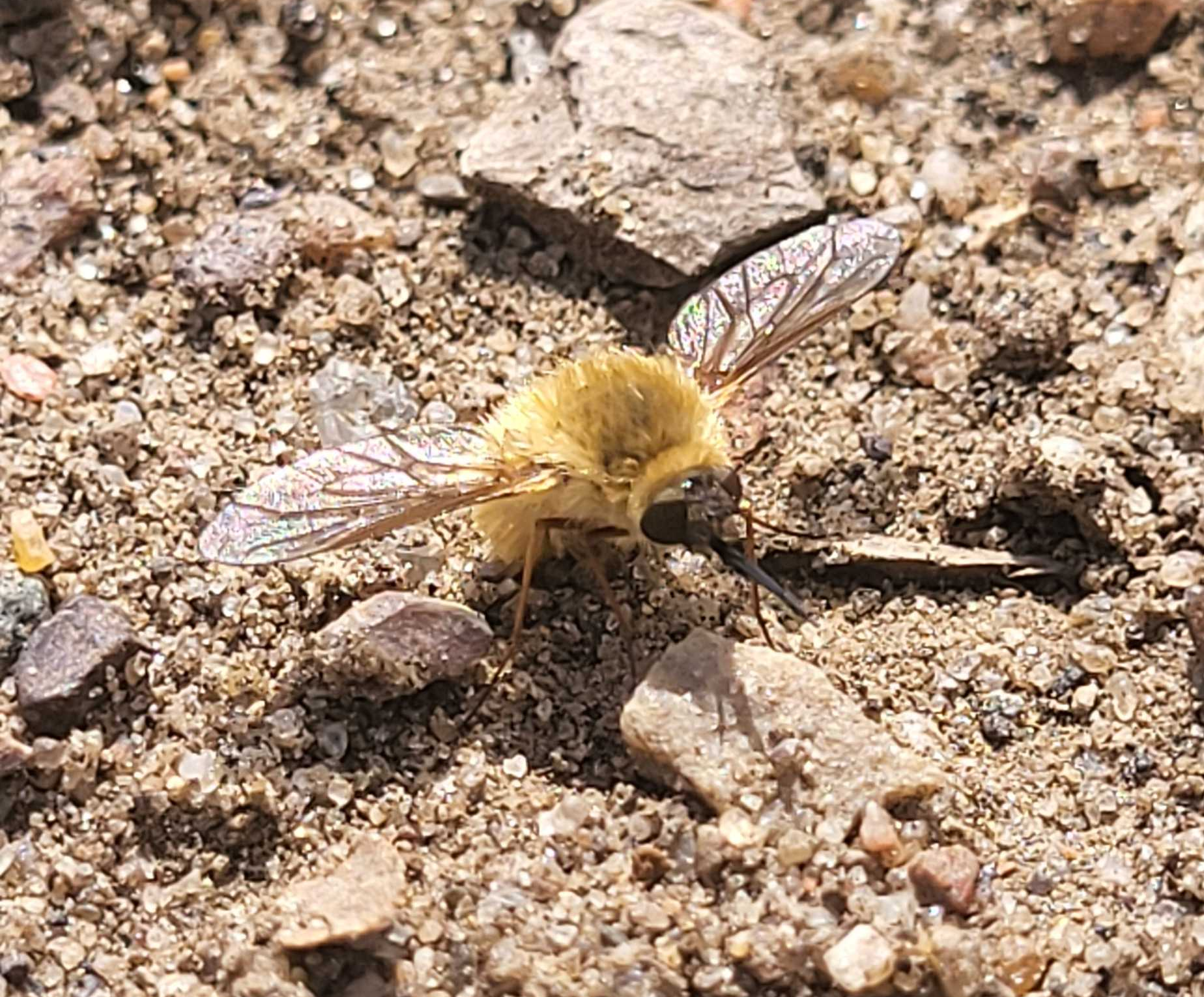

Scientific classification
- Kingdom: Animalia
- Phylum: Arthropoda
- Clade: Pancrustacea
- Class: Insecta
- Order: Diptera
- Family: Bombyliidae
- Tribe: Bombyliini
- Genus: Systoechus
- Species: S. vulgaris

Binomial name
- Systoechus vulgaris Loew, 1863

= Systoechus vulgaris =

Species of fly

Systoechus vulgaris, the grasshopper bee fly, is a species of bee fly in the family Bombyliidae. It is found in Canada and across most of the United States. Its larvae are predators of grasshopper eggs.
