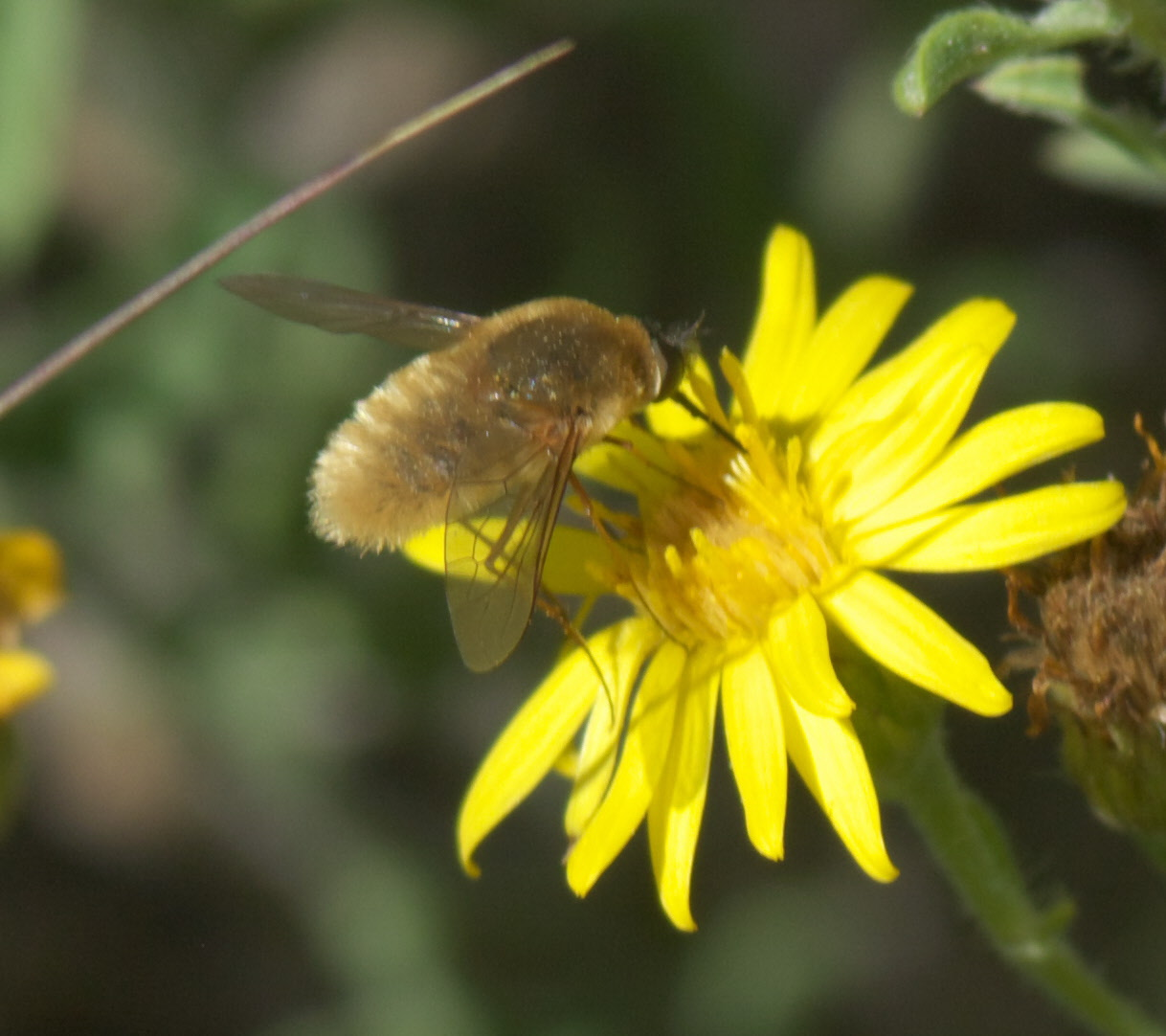

Scientific classification
- Domain: Eukaryota
- Kingdom: Animalia
- Phylum: Arthropoda
- Class: Insecta
- Order: Diptera
- Family: Bombyliidae
- Tribe: Bombyliini
- Genus: Systoechus; Loew, 1855

Diversity
- at least 120 species

= Systoechus =

Genus of bee flies

Systoechus is a genus of bee flies in the family Bombyliidae. There are more than 120 described species in Systoechus.

== See also ==
- List of Systoechus species
