= Paracosmus rubicundus =

Scientific classification
- Domain: Eukaryota
- Kingdom: Animalia
- Phylum: Arthropoda
- Class: Insecta
- Order: Diptera
- Family: Bombyliidae
- Genus: Paracosmus
- Species: P. rubicundus

Binomial name
- Paracosmus rubicundus Melander, 1950

Species of fly

Paracosmus rubicundus is a species of bee fly in the family Bombyliidae. It is known from Mexico, California, and Arizona.
