= Amphicosmus =

Scientific classification
- Domain: Eukaryota
- Kingdom: Animalia
- Phylum: Arthropoda
- Class: Insecta
- Order: Diptera
- Family: Bombyliidae
- Subfamily: Tomomyzinae
- Genus: Amphicosmus; Coquillett, 1891

Genus of flies

Amphicosmus is a genus of bee flies in the family Bombyliidae. There are five described species in Amphicosmus.

== Species ==
These five species belong to the genus Amphicosmus:

- Amphicosmus arizonensis Johnson & Johnson, 1960^{i c g b}
- Amphicosmus arizonicus Hall, 1975^{i c g b}
- Amphicosmus cincturus Williston, 1901^{i c g}
- Amphicosmus elegans Coquillett, 1891^{i c g}
- Amphicosmus vanduzeei Cole, 1923^{i c g}

Data sources: i = ITIS, c = Catalogue of Life, g = GBIF, b = Bugguide.net
