= Paracosmus insolens =

Scientific classification
- Domain: Eukaryota
- Kingdom: Animalia
- Phylum: Arthropoda
- Class: Insecta
- Order: Diptera
- Family: Bombyliidae
- Genus: Paracosmus
- Species: P. insolens

Binomial name
- Paracosmus insolens Coquillett, 1891

Species of fly

Paracosmus insolens is a species of bee fly in the family Bombyliidae. It is known from California and Nevada.
