= Paracosmus morrisoni =

Scientific classification
- Domain: Eukaryota
- Kingdom: Animalia
- Phylum: Arthropoda
- Class: Insecta
- Order: Diptera
- Family: Bombyliidae
- Genus: Paracosmus
- Species: P. morrisoni

Binomial name
- Paracosmus morrisoni Osten Sacken, 1887

Species of fly

Paracosmus morrisoni is a species of bee fly in the family Bombyliidae. It is found in Mexico and the southwestern United States from California to Texas.
