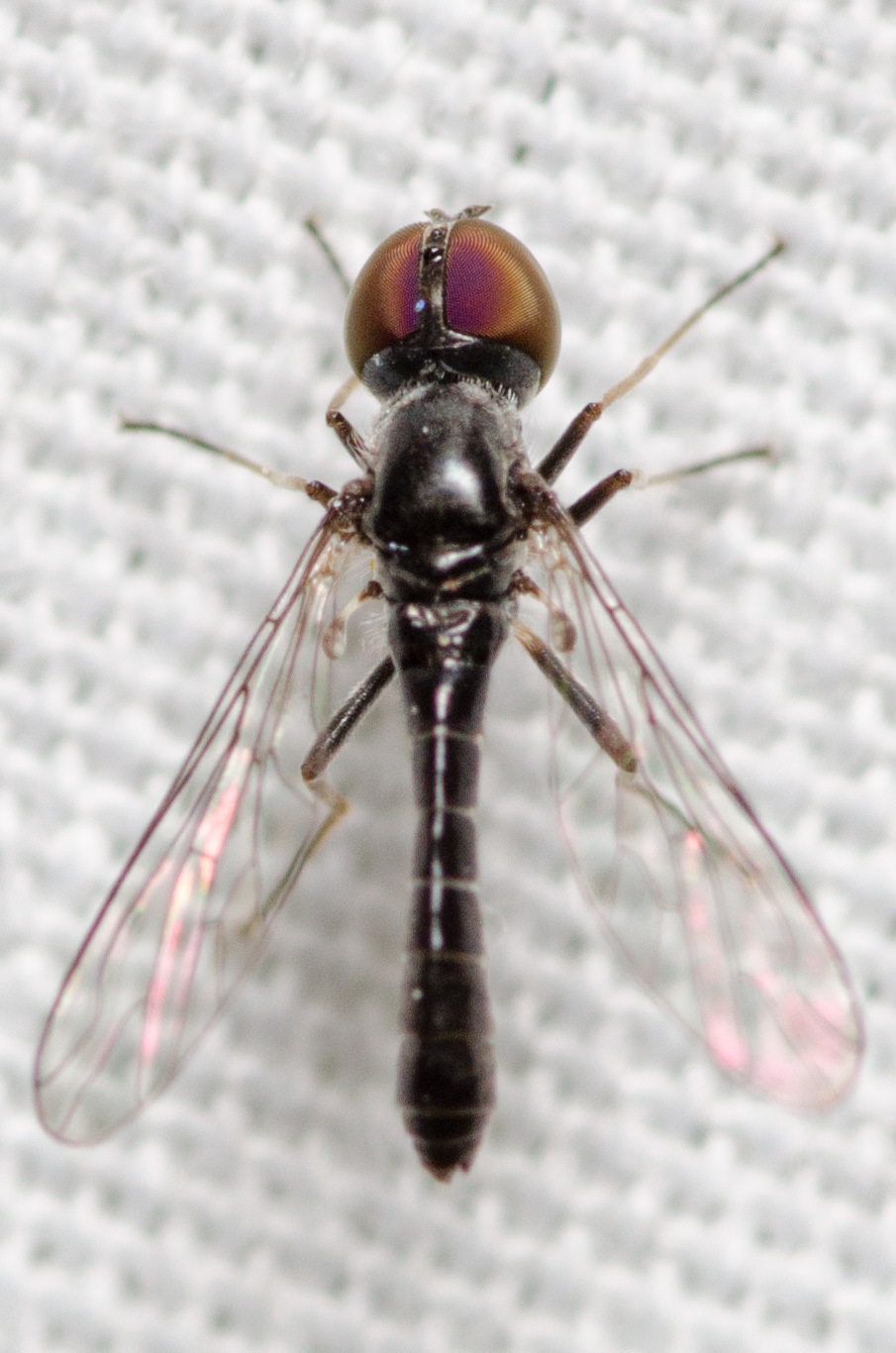
- Metacosmus mancipennis

Scientific classification
- Domain: Eukaryota
- Kingdom: Animalia
- Phylum: Arthropoda
- Class: Insecta
- Order: Diptera
- Family: Bombyliidae
- Subfamily: Tomomyzinae; Coquillett, 1910

= Tomomyzinae =

Subfamily of flies

Tomomyzinae is a subfamily of bee flies in the family Bombyliidae. There are six genera and more than 50 described species in Tomomyzinae.

== Genera ==
These six genera belong to the subfamily Tomomyzinae:

- Amphicosmus Coquillett, 1891^{i c g b}
- Docidomyia White, 1916^{c g}
- Metacosmus Coquillett, 1891^{i c g}
- Pantostomus Bezzi, 1921^{c g}
- Paracosmus Osten Sacken, 1877^{i c g b}
- Tomomyza Wiedemann, 1820^{c g}

Data sources: i = ITIS, c = Catalogue of Life, g = GBIF, b = Bugguide.net
