= Paracosmus edwardsii =

Scientific classification
- Domain: Eukaryota
- Kingdom: Animalia
- Phylum: Arthropoda
- Class: Insecta
- Order: Diptera
- Family: Bombyliidae
- Genus: Paracosmus
- Species: P. edwardsii

Binomial name
- Paracosmus edwardsii (Loew, 1872)

Synonyms
- Allocotus edwardsii Loew, 1872

Species of fly

Paracosmus edwardsii is a species of bee fly in the family Bombyliidae. It is known from California and Utah.
