= Paracosmus =

Scientific classification
- Domain: Eukaryota
- Kingdom: Animalia
- Phylum: Arthropoda
- Class: Insecta
- Order: Diptera
- Family: Bombyliidae
- Subfamily: Tomomyzinae
- Genus: Paracosmus; Osten-Sacken, 1877

Synonyms
- Allocotus Berliner, 1872

Genus of flies

Paracosmus is a North American genus of bee flies in the family Bombyliidae. There are five described species in Paracosmus.

== Species ==
These five species belong to the genus Paracosmus:

- Paracosmus edwardsii (Loew, 1872)^{i c g b}
- Paracosmus insolens Coquillett, 1891^{i c g b}
- Paracosmus morrisoni Osten Sacken, 1887^{i c g b}
- Paracosmus rubicundus Melander, 1950^{i c g b}
- Paracosmus similis Hall, 1957^{i c g}

Data sources: i = ITIS, c = Catalogue of Life, g = GBIF, b = Bugguide.net
