= Amphicosmus arizonensis =

Scientific classification
- Domain: Eukaryota
- Kingdom: Animalia
- Phylum: Arthropoda
- Class: Insecta
- Order: Diptera
- Family: Bombyliidae
- Genus: Amphicosmus
- Species: A. arizonensis

Binomial name
- Amphicosmus arizonensis Johnson & Johnson, 1960

Species of fly

Amphicosmus arizonensis is a species of bee fly in the family Bombyliidae. It is known from Arizona.
