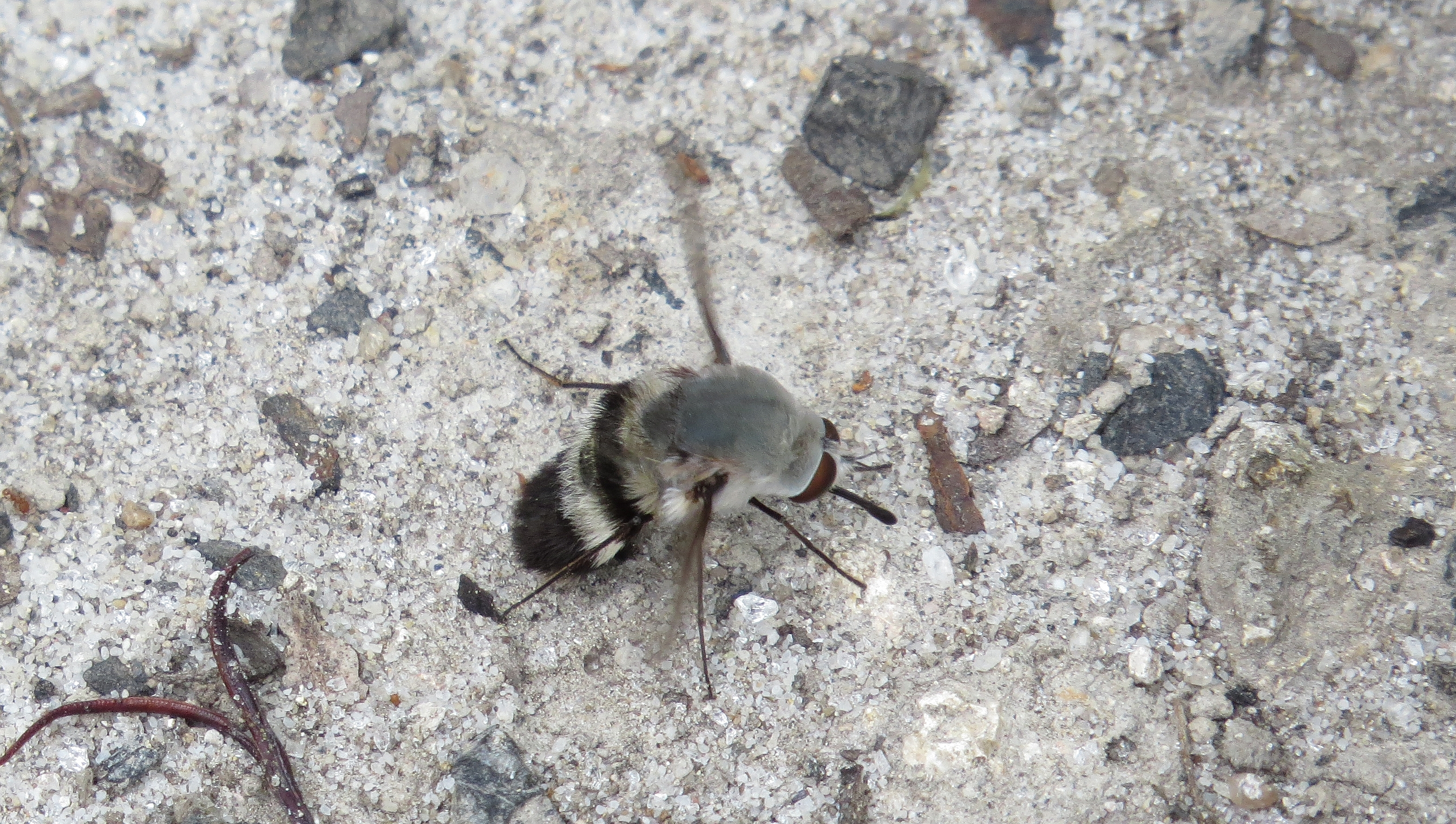
- Meomyia sericans

Scientific classification
- Domain: Eukaryota
- Kingdom: Animalia
- Phylum: Arthropoda
- Class: Insecta
- Order: Diptera
- Family: Bombyliidae
- Subfamily: Bombyliinae
- Tribe: Bombyliini
- Genus: Meomyia; Evenhuis 1983

= Meomyia =

Genus of flies

Meomyia is a genus of flies belonging to the family Bombyliidae (bee flies).

== Species ==
- Meomyia albiceps (Macquart 1848)
- Meomyia australis (Guerin-Meneville 1831)
- Meomyia callynthrophora (Schiner 1868)
- Meomyia fasciculata (Macquart 1840)
- Meomyia pausaria (Jaennicke 1867)
- Meomyia penicillata (Macquart 1850)
- Meomyia sericans (Macquart 1850)
- Meomyia tetratricha (Walker 1849)
- Meomyia vetusta (Walker 1849)
- Meomyia yeatesi Evenhuis & Greathead 1999
