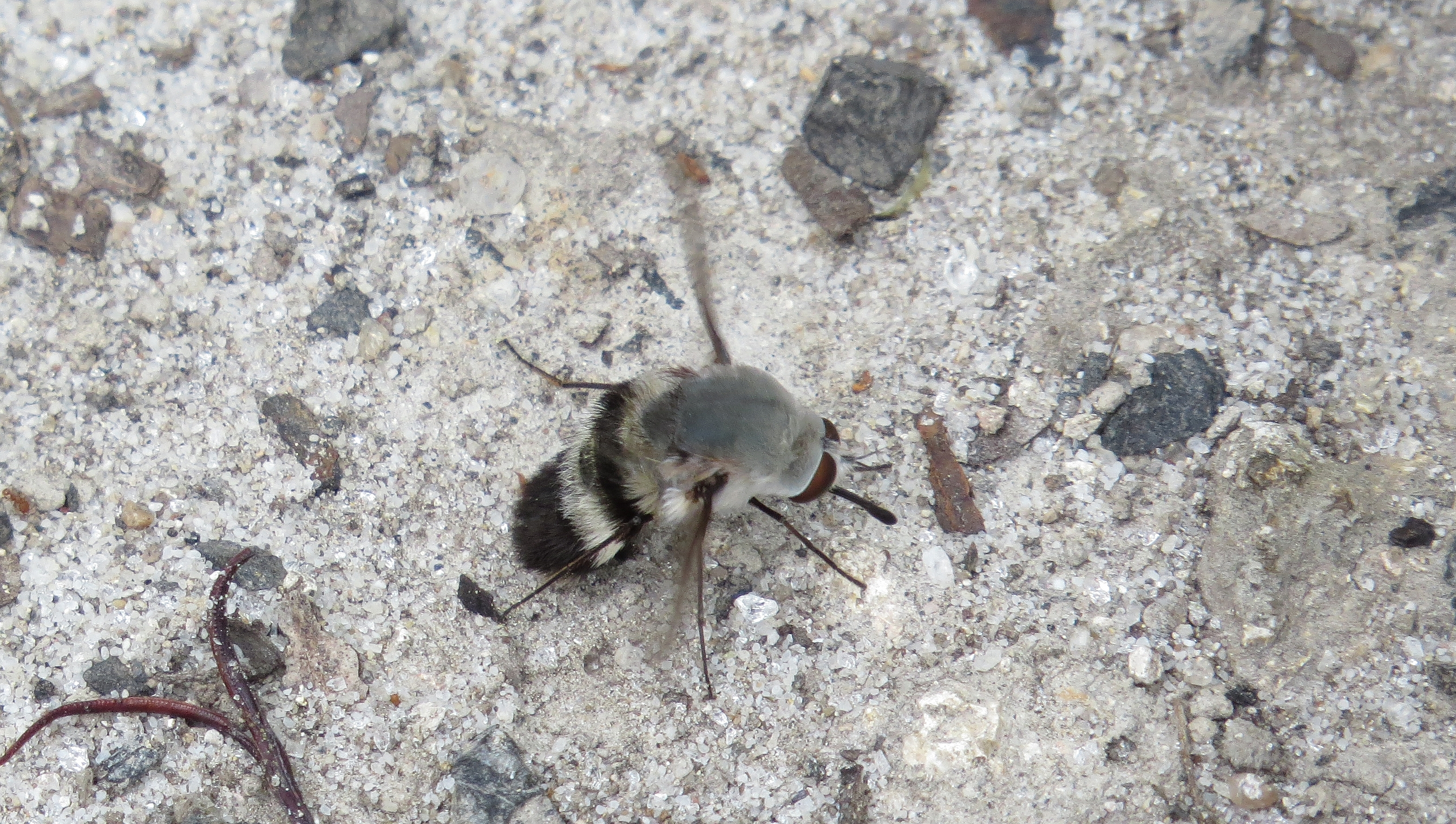

Scientific classification
- Domain: Eukaryota
- Kingdom: Animalia
- Phylum: Arthropoda
- Class: Insecta
- Order: Diptera
- Family: Bombyliidae
- Genus: Meomyia
- Species: M. sericans

Binomial name
- Meomyia sericans Macquart, 1850

= Meomyia sericans =

Black and grey true bee fly

Species of fly

Meomyia sericans, the black and grey true bee fly, is a large species of fly in the family Bombyliidae. A flying Australian insect with black and white hairs on the abdomen with a grey thorax. The probiscis is long and slender. Wings appear somewhat tinted. In October, they may be seeing flying low, then laying eggs in the earth, including walking tracks. Food plants include the tea trees in the genus Leptospermum.
