= Triploechus =

Scientific classification
- Domain: Eukaryota
- Kingdom: Animalia
- Phylum: Arthropoda
- Class: Insecta
- Order: Diptera
- Family: Bombyliidae
- Tribe: Bombyliini
- Genus: Triploechus; Edwards, 1937

Genus of flies

Triploechus is a genus of bee flies, insects in the family Bombyliidae. There are about 10 described species in Triploechus.

== Species ==
These 10 species belong to the genus Triploechus:

- Triploechus angustipennis Edwards, 1937^{c g}
- Triploechus bellus (Philippi, 1865)^{c}
- Triploechus divisus Cresson, 1919^{c g}
- Triploechus heteronevrus (Macquart, 1850)^{c g}
- Triploechus luridus Hall, 1975^{i c g}
- Triploechus novus (Williston, 1893)^{i c g b}
- Triploechus pallipes Edwards, 1937^{c g}
- Triploechus sackeni (Williston, 1893)^{i c g}
- Triploechus stagei Hall, 1975^{i c g}
- Triploechus vierecki Cresson, 1919^{c g}

Data sources: i = ITIS, c = Catalogue of Life, g = GBIF, b = Bugguide.net
