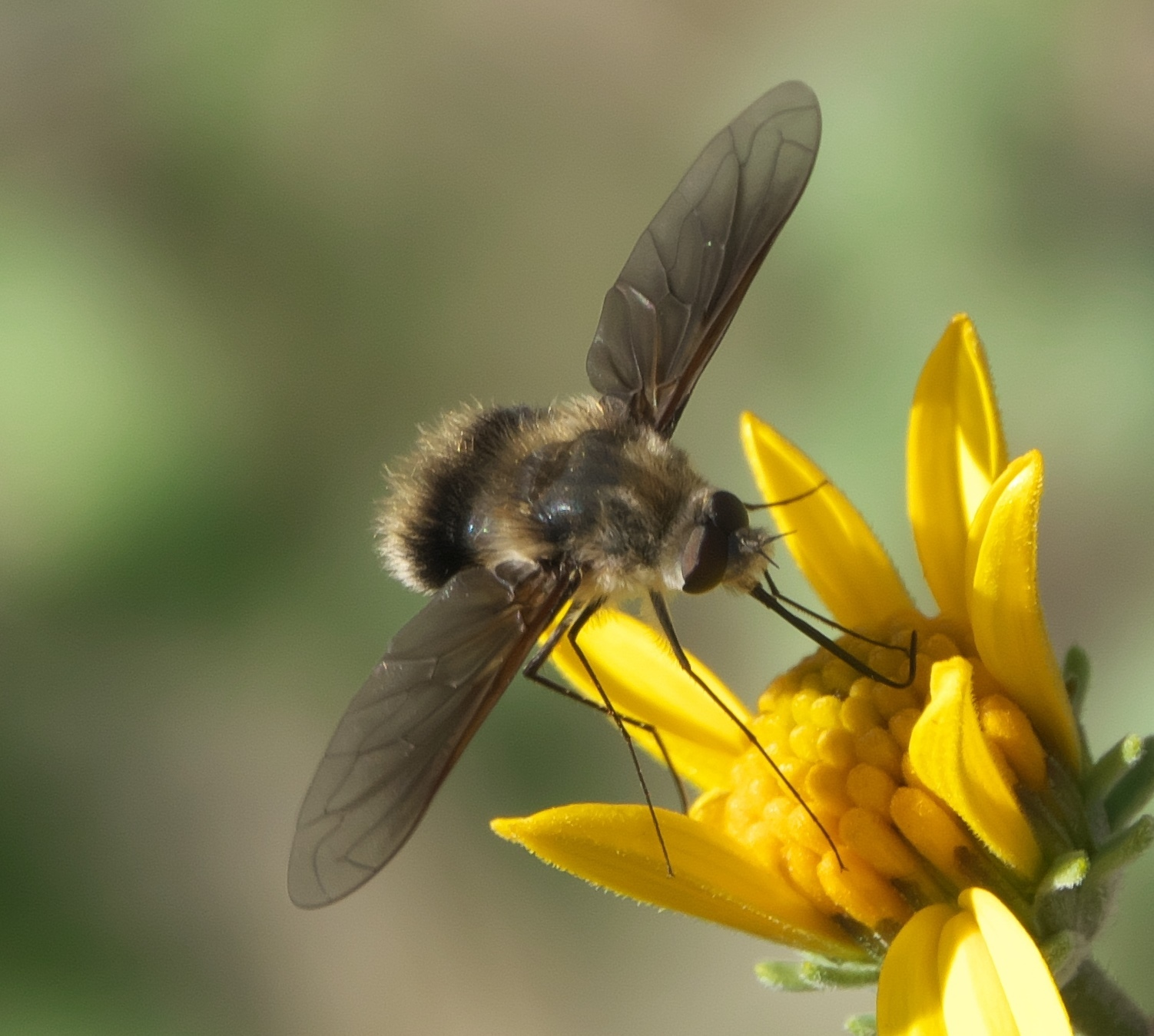
- Triploechus novus, Arizona

Scientific classification
- Domain: Eukaryota
- Kingdom: Animalia
- Phylum: Arthropoda
- Class: Insecta
- Order: Diptera
- Family: Bombyliidae
- Tribe: Bombyliini
- Genus: Triploechus
- Species: T. novus

Binomial name
- Triploechus novus (Williston, 1893)

Synonyms
- Bombylius recurvus Coquillett, 1920; Heterostylum vierecki Cresson, 1919; Triplasius novus Williston, 1893

= Triploechus novus =

Species of fly

Triploechus novus is a species of bee flies, insects in the family Bombyliidae.
