= Tripetaloceroides =

Scientific classification
- Domain: Eukaryota
- Kingdom: Animalia
- Phylum: Arthropoda
- Class: Insecta
- Order: Orthoptera
- Suborder: Caelifera
- Family: Tetrigidae
- Subfamily: Tripetalocerinae
- Tribe: Tripetalocerini
- Genus: Tripetaloceroides; Storozhenko, 2013
- Species: T. tonkinensis

Binomial name
- Tripetaloceroides tonkinensis (Günther, 1938)

Genus of Caelifera

External image
- Images at iNaturalist

Tripetaloceroides is a genus of Asian groundhoppers (Orthoptera: Caelifera) in the subfamily Tripetalocerinae and tribe Tripetalocerini Bolívar, 1887.

The genus was erected in 2013 by S.Y. Storozhenko and is considered monotypic with the species Tripetaloceroides tonkinensis (originally as Tripetalocera tonkinensis Günther K, 1938); to date it has been found in Vietnam and southern China.
