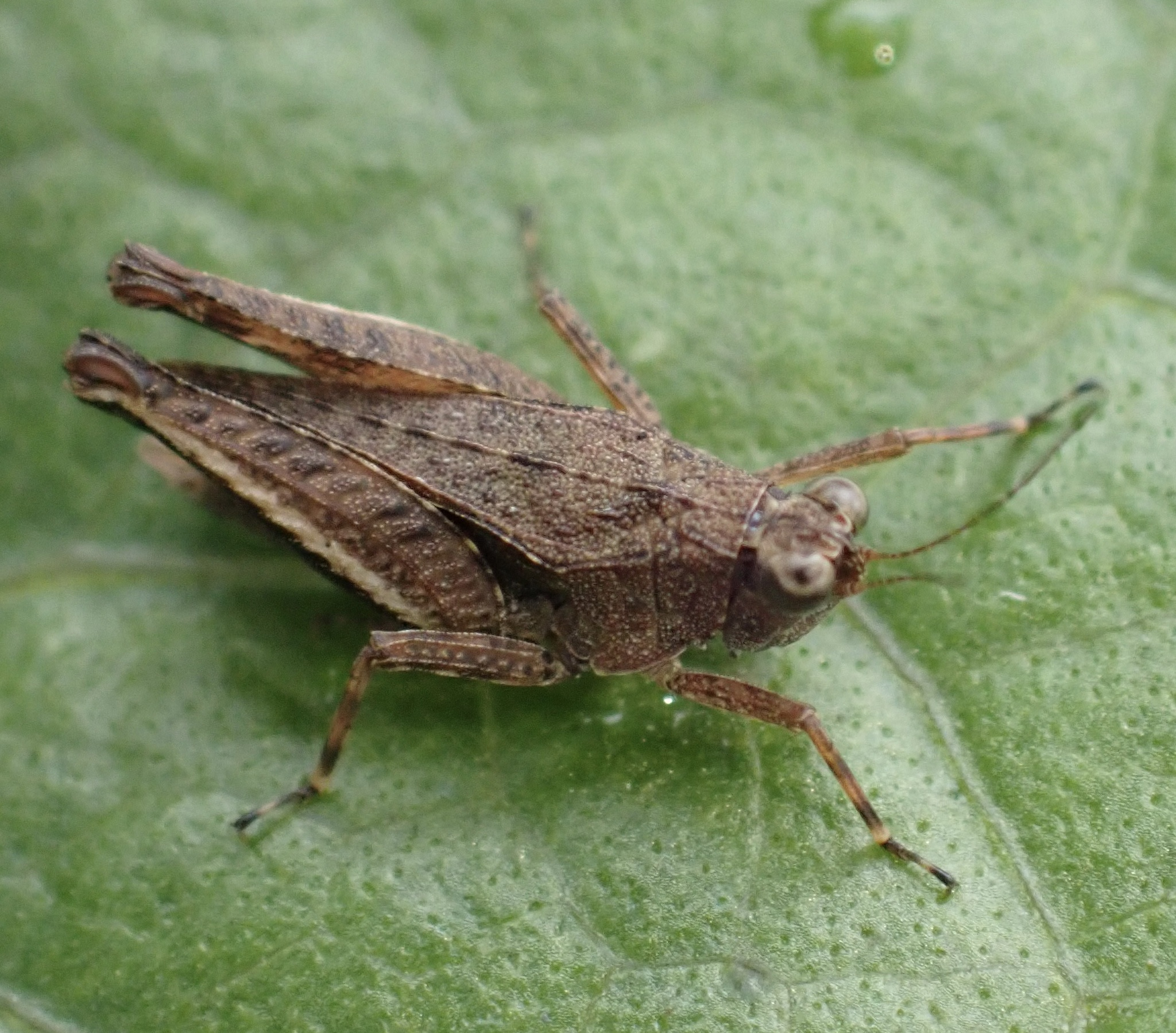
- Loxilobus celebensis

Scientific classification
- Kingdom: Animalia
- Phylum: Arthropoda
- Clade: Pancrustacea
- Class: Insecta
- Order: Orthoptera
- Suborder: Caelifera
- Family: Tetrigidae
- Subfamily: Criotettiginae
- Tribe: Thoradontini
- Genus: Loxilobus; Hancock, 1904

= Loxilobus =

Genus of grasshoppers

Loxilobus is a genus of ground-hoppers in the tribe Thoradontini. Species have been recorded from West Africa, throughout Asia and Australia.

== Species ==
Loxilobus includes the species:

- Loxilobus accola Rehn, 1952
- Loxilobus acutus Hancock, 1904 - type species
- Loxilobus angulatus Hancock, 1909
- Loxilobus assamus Hancock, 1907
- Loxilobus bantu Rehn, 1930
- Loxilobus brunneri Günther, 1938
- Loxilobus celebensis Günther, 1937
- Loxilobus compactus Walker, 1871
- Loxilobus desiderius Günther, 1938
- Loxilobus dolichonotus Deng, 2018
- Loxilobus formosanus Günther, 1941
- Loxilobus insidiosus Bolívar, 1887
- Loxilobus karnyi Günther, 1938
- Loxilobus kraepelini Günther, 1938
- Loxilobus leveri Günther, 1938
- Loxilobus luzonicus Bruner, 1915
- Loxilobus manillensis Bruner, 1915
- Loxilobus novaebritanniae Günther, 1938
- Loxilobus prominenoculus Zheng & Li, 2001
- Loxilobus pulcher Bolívar, 1887
- Loxilobus pullus Bolívar, 1887
- Loxilobus rugosus Bolívar, 1887
- Loxilobus saigonensis Günther, 1938
- Loxilobus striatus Hancock, 1915
- Loxilobus tongbiguanensis Zheng & Mao, 2010
- Loxilobus truncatus Hancock, 1907
- Loxilobus willemsei Günther, 1938
- Loxilobus zhengi Deng, 2018
