= Hildegardia =

Hildegardia may refer to:

- Hildegardia (insect), a genus of insect in the family Tetrigidae
- Hildegardia (plant), a genus of flowering plants in the family Malvaceae
