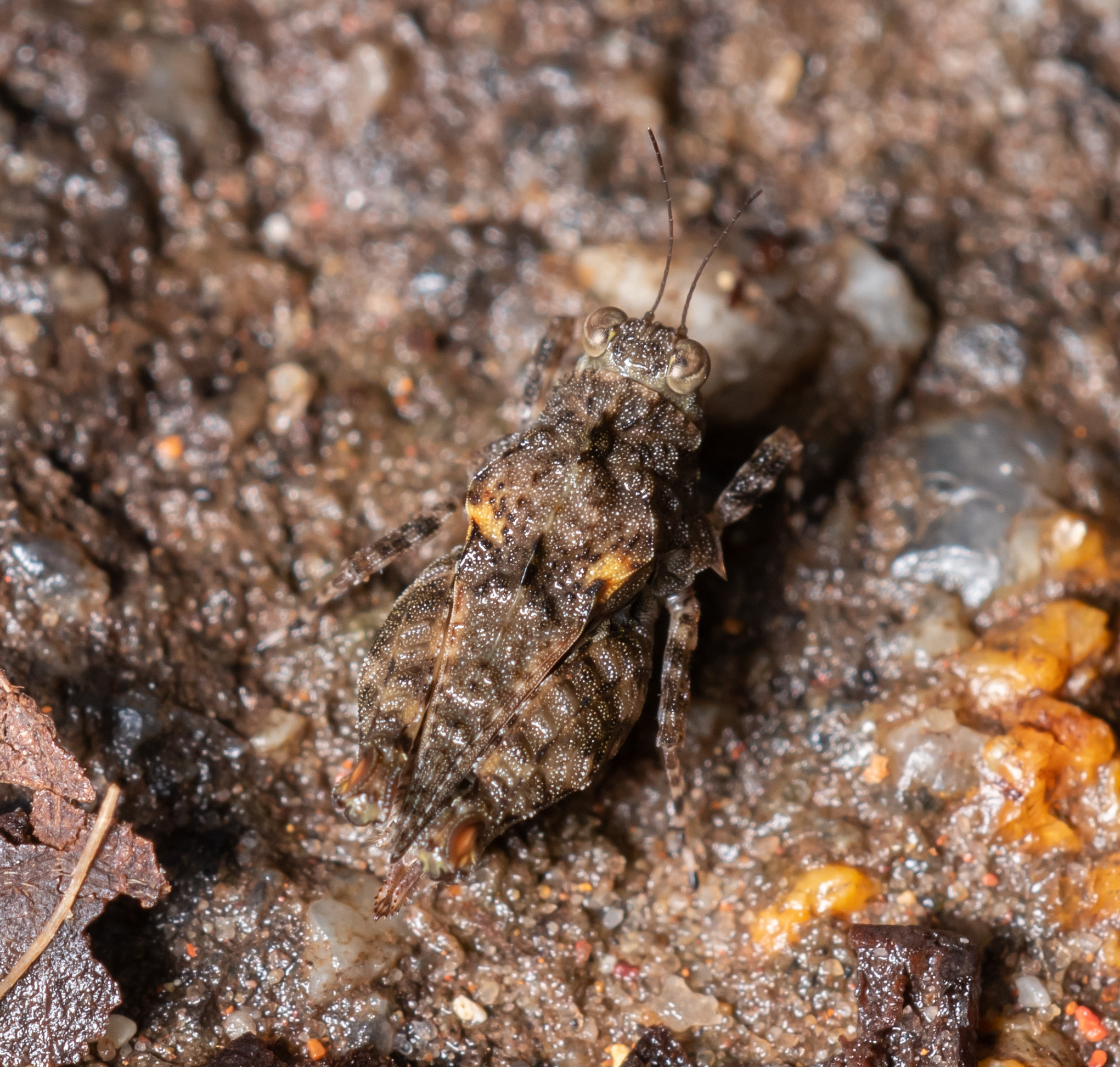
- Thoradonta nodulosa from Sumatra

Scientific classification
- Kingdom: Animalia
- Phylum: Arthropoda
- Clade: Pancrustacea
- Class: Insecta
- Order: Orthoptera
- Suborder: Caelifera
- Family: Tetrigidae
- Tribe: Thoradontini
- Genus: Thoradonta; Hancock, 1909

Synonyms
- Thoradomta Deng, 2016; Thoradonata Otte, 1997; Thoradonota Kevan, 1966; Thorodonota Mahmood, Maqsood & Anwar, 2004; Thorodonta Steinmann, 1962

= Thoradonta =

Genus of grasshoppers

Thoradonta is an Asian genus of ground-hoppers (Orthoptera: Caelifera) and typical of the tribe Thoradontini.

This genus contains species distributed from India to southern China, Indo-China, Malesia through to New Guinea.

== Species ==
The Orthoptera Species File lists:

- Thoradonta apiculata Hancock, 1915
- Thoradonta aspinosa Ingrisch, 2001
- Thoradonta bengalensis Shishodia, 1991
- Thoradonta butlini Blackith & Blackith, 1987
- Thoradonta centropleura Podgornaya, 1994
- Thoradonta dentata Hancock, 1909 - type species
- Thoradonta dianguiensis Deng, Zheng & Wei, 2006
- Thoradonta lancangensis Zheng, 1991
- Thoradonta lativertexoides Zha & Kang, 2016
- Thoradonta lativertex Günther, 1938
- Thoradonta longipenna Zheng & Liang, 1991
- Thoradonta longispina Zheng & Xie, 2005
- Thoradonta nigrodorsalis Zheng & Liang, 1991
- Thoradonta nodulosa Stål, 1861
- Thoradonta novaeguineae Tumbrinck, 2018
- Thoradonta obtusilobata Zheng, 1996
- Thoradonta palawanica Günther, 1938
- Thoradonta spiculoba Hancock, 1912
- Thoradonta spiculobaoides Zha & Kang, 2016
- Thoradonta spinata Hancock, 1909
- Thoradonta spinata Hancock, 1909
- Thoradonta subtruncata Gupta, Shi & Chandra, 2018
- Thoradonta transspicula Zheng, 1996
- Thoradonta varispina Zha & Sheng, 2016
- Thoradonta yunnana Zheng, 1983
