= Acanthalobus =

Scientific classification
- Kingdom: Animalia
- Phylum: Arthropoda
- Clade: Pancrustacea
- Class: Insecta
- Order: Orthoptera
- Suborder: Caelifera
- Family: Tetrigidae
- Subfamily: Criotettiginae
- Tribe: Criotettigini
- Genus: Acanthalobus; Hancock, 1904

Genus of Caelifera

Acanthalobus is a genus of Asian ground-hoppers (Orthoptera: Caelifera) in the tribe Criotettigini; species are recorded from Afganistan to India.

== Species ==
The Orthoptera Species File includes:

1. Acanthalobus afghanus (Cejchan, 1969)
2. Acanthalobus curticornis Hancock, 1915
3. Acanthalobus gariyabandicus (Gupta & Chandra, 2018)
4. Acanthalobus gidhavensis (Gupta & Chandra, 2018)
5. Acanthalobus inornatus (Walker, 1871) - type species (by subsequent designation of Criotettix saginatus Bolívar, 1887)
6. Acanthalobus latifrons (Hebard, 1930)
