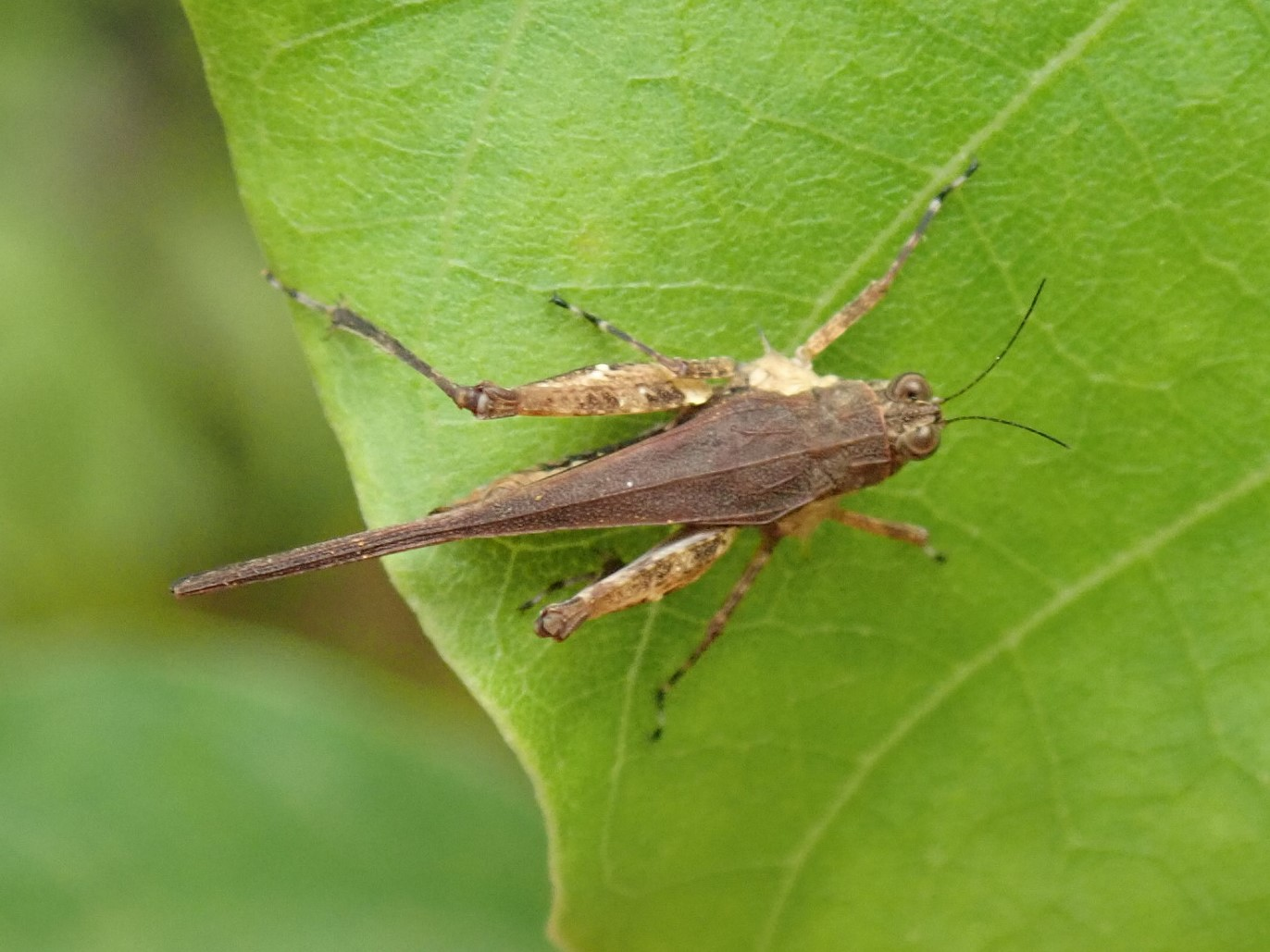
- Eucriotettix tricarinatus

Scientific classification
- Kingdom: Animalia
- Phylum: Arthropoda
- Class: Insecta
- Order: Orthoptera
- Suborder: Caelifera
- Family: Tetrigidae
- Tribe: Thoradontini
- Genus: Eucriotettix; Hebard, 1930

Synonyms
- Systolotettix Hebard, 1930

= Eucriotettix =

Genus of Caelifera

Eucriotettix is a genus of ground-hoppers (Orthoptera: Caelifera) in the tribe Thoradontini. Species have been recorded from tropical Asia: India, Indochina, through to New Guinea.

== Species ==
The Orthoptera Species File includes:

1. Eucriotettix aequalis Hancock, 1912
2. Eucriotettix amplifemurus Zheng, 1998
3. Eucriotettix anisyutkini Storozhenko & Dawwrueng, 2015
4. Eucriotettix annandalei Hancock, 1915
5. Eucriotettix aptus Bolívar, 1898
6. Eucriotettix bolotettigiellus Günther, 1938
7. Eucriotettix brachynotus Zheng & Jiang, 1997
8. Eucriotettix curvinotus Deng, 2016
9. Eucriotettix dammermanni Günther, 1938
10. Eucriotettix dyscheres Günther, 1939
11. Eucriotettix edithae Kaltenbach, 1979
12. Eucriotettix exsertus Bolívar, 1902
13. Eucriotettix flavopictus Bolívar, 1902
14. Eucriotettix grandis Hancock, 1912
15. Eucriotettix guipingensis Li, Zheng & Lu, 2000
16. Eucriotettix hainanensis Günther, 1938
17. Eucriotettix indicus (Bolívar, 1902)
18. Eucriotettix interrupta Deng, Zheng & Wei, 2006
19. Eucriotettix longipennis Deng, Zheng & Wei, 2007
20. Eucriotettix maculatus (Kirby, 1914)
21. Eucriotettix magnus (Hancock, 1907)
22. Eucriotettix molestus (Günther, 1938)
23. Eucriotettix montanus (Hancock, 1912)
24. Eucriotettix neesoon Tan & Storozhenko, 2018
25. Eucriotettix nigripennis Deng & Zheng, 2012
26. Eucriotettix oculatus (Bolívar, 1898)
27. Eucriotettix peregrinus (Günther, 1938)
28. Eucriotettix rufescens (Kirby, 1914)
29. Eucriotettix simulans Tan & Storozhenko, 2017
30. Eucriotettix spinilobus Hancock, 1904
31. Eucriotettix strictivertex Deng & Zheng, 2012
32. Eucriotettix superfluus (Günther, 1936)
33. Eucriotettix tenuis (Günther, 1936)
34. Eucriotettix thienemanni Günther, 1938
35. Eucriotettix torulisinotus Li, Deng, Zheng & Wei, 2014
36. Eucriotettix tricarinatus (Bolívar, 1887) - type species (as Criotettix tricarinatus Bolívar: India)
37. Eucriotettix tridentatus Li, Deng, Zheng & Wei, 2014
38. Eucriotettix wuliangshanensis Zheng & Ou, 2003
