= Nomotettix parvus =

Scientific classification
- Domain: Eukaryota
- Kingdom: Animalia
- Phylum: Arthropoda
- Class: Insecta
- Order: Orthoptera
- Suborder: Caelifera
- Family: Tetrigidae
- Genus: Nomotettix
- Species: N. parvus

Binomial name
- Nomotettix parvus Morse, 1895

Species of grasshopper

Nomotettix parvus, the low-ridged pygmy grasshopper, is a species of pygmy grasshopper in the family Tetrigidae. It is found in North America.
