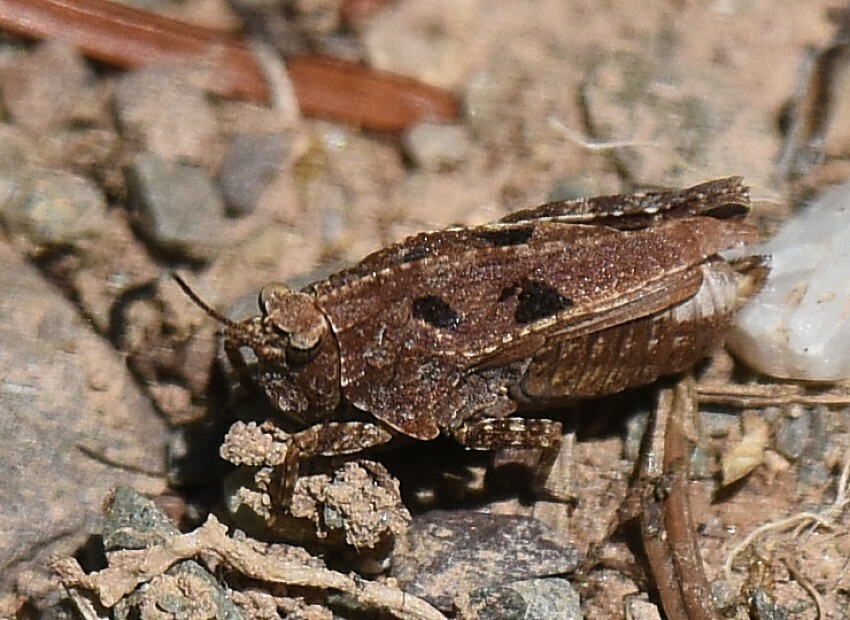

Scientific classification
- Domain: Eukaryota
- Kingdom: Animalia
- Phylum: Arthropoda
- Class: Insecta
- Order: Orthoptera
- Suborder: Caelifera
- Family: Tetrigidae
- Genus: Nomotettix
- Species: N. cristatus

Binomial name
- Nomotettix cristatus (Scudder, 1863)

= Nomotettix cristatus =

Species of grasshopper

Nomotettix cristatus, known generally as crested pygmy grasshopper, is a species of pygmy grasshopper in the family Tetrigidae. Other common names include the crested grouse locust and northern crested grouse locust. It is found in North America.

== Subspecies ==
These three subspecies belong to the species Nomotettix cristatus:

- Nomotettix cristatus compressus Morse, 1895
- Nomotettix cristatus cristatus (Scudder, 1862)
- Nomotettix cristatus floridanus Hancock, 1902
