= Hedotettix grossivalva =

Scientific classification
- Domain: Eukaryota
- Kingdom: Animalia
- Phylum: Arthropoda
- Class: Insecta
- Order: Orthoptera
- Suborder: Caelifera
- Family: Tetrigidae
- Genus: Hedotettix
- Species: H. grossivalva

Binomial name
- Hedotettix grossivalva Zheng & Ou, 2006

Species of grasshopper

Hedotettix grossivalva is an insect found in China, belonging to the Tetrigidae family.

== See also ==
- Hedotettix brachynota
- Hedotettix xueshanensis
