= Lophotettix =

Scientific classification
- Kingdom: Animalia
- Phylum: Arthropoda
- Clade: Pancrustacea
- Class: Insecta
- Order: Orthoptera
- Suborder: Caelifera
- Infraorder: Acrididea
- Superfamily: Tetrigoidea
- Family: Tetrigidae
- Subfamily: Lophotettiginae
- Genus: Lophotettix; Hancock, 1909

Genus of grasshoppers

Lophotettix is a genus of South American groundhoppers or pygmy grasshopper. There are about five described species in Lophotettix.

== Species ==
These five species belong to the genus Lophotettix:

- Lophotettix alticristatus Hancock, 1909
- Lophotettix brevicristatus Hancock, 1909 - type species (Brazil)
- Lophotettix hancocki (Bruner, 1910)
- Lophotettix unicristatus Hancock, 1909
- Lophotettix zumbadoi Barranco, 2010
