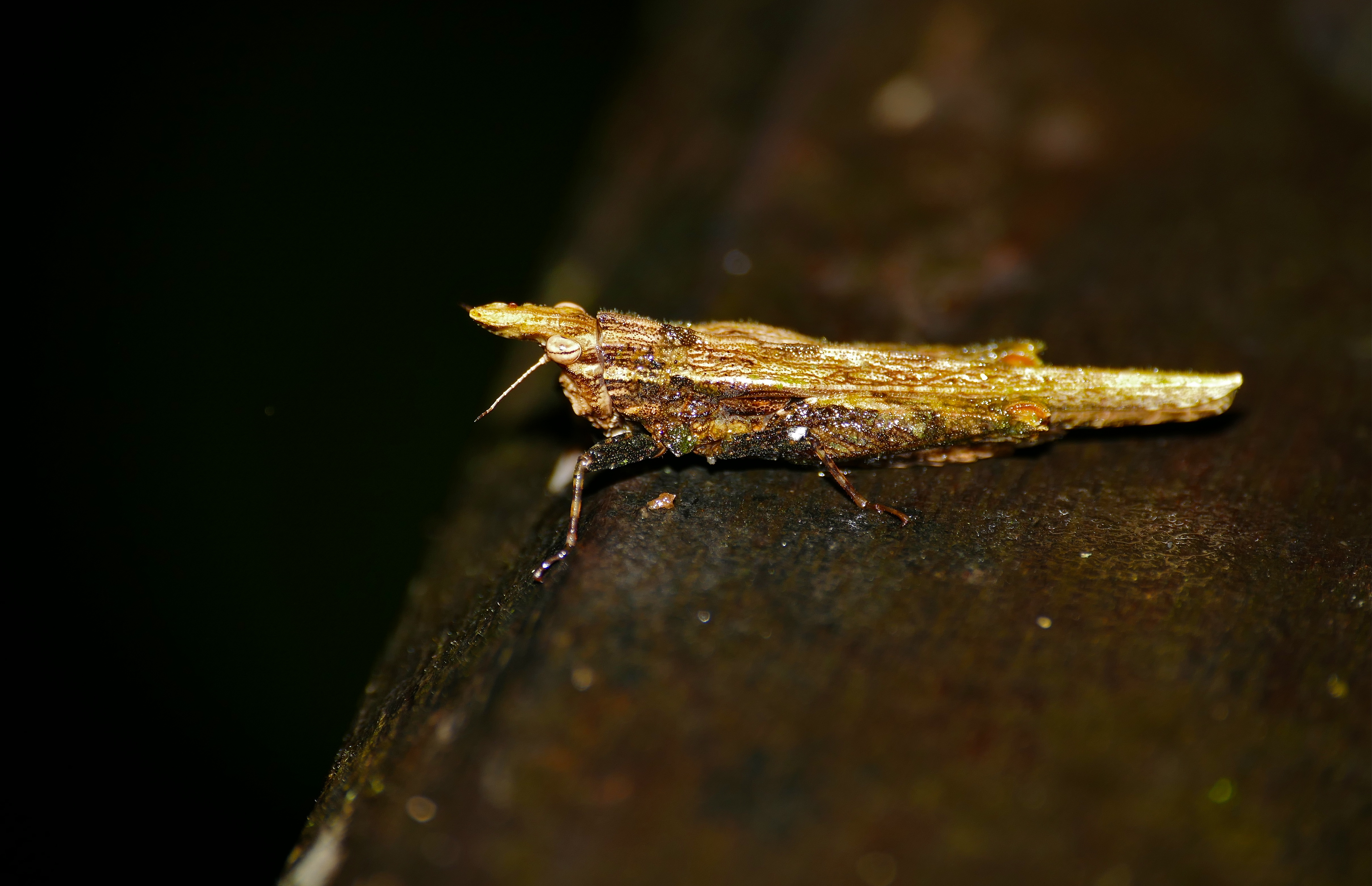
- Rostella phyllocera

Scientific classification
- Kingdom: Animalia
- Phylum: Arthropoda
- Clade: Pancrustacea
- Class: Insecta
- Order: Orthoptera
- Suborder: Caelifera
- Family: Tetrigidae
- Subfamily: Criotettiginae
- Genus: Rostella; Hancock, 1913

Synonyms
- Mitrariella Willemse, 1928

= Rostella =

Genus of Caelifera

Rostella is a genus of Asian groundhoppers (Orthoptera: Caelifera) in the subfamily Criotettiginae; it was erected by Joseph Hancock in 1913. (no tribe assigned, previously placed in the Cleostratini by S.Y. Storozhenko). The recorded distribution for species in this genus (possibly incomplete) is Thailand and western Malesia.

== Species ==
The Orthoptera Species File includes:

1. Rostella gorochovi Storozhenko, 2016
2. Rostella guentheri Kevan, 1966
3. Rostella phyllocera (Haan, 1843) – type species (as Acridium (Tetrix) phyllocerum Haan, 1843)
4. Rostella processus (Hancock, 1907)
5. Rostella sumatrana (Willemse, 1928)
