= Bienkotetrix =

Scientific classification
- Domain: Eukaryota
- Kingdom: Animalia
- Phylum: Arthropoda
- Class: Insecta
- Order: Orthoptera
- Suborder: Caelifera
- Family: Tetrigidae
- Genus: Bienkotetrix; Karaman, 1965
- Species: B. tibetanus

Binomial name
- Bienkotetrix tibetanus (Uvarov, 1925)

Genus of grasshoppers

Bienkotetrix is a genus of groundhoppers in the family Tetrigidae comprising, as of December 2018, only a single species, Bienkotetrix tibetanus. As its name suggests, it occurs in Tibet.

Formerly included was Bienkotetrix transsylvanicus (now Tetrix transsylvanica).
