= Coptotettix =

Scientific classification
- Kingdom: Animalia
- Phylum: Arthropoda
- Class: Insecta
- Order: Orthoptera
- Suborder: Caelifera
- Family: Tetrigidae
- Genus: Coptotettix; Bolívar, 1887

Synonyms
- Copotettix [sic] Bolívar, 1887

Genus of grasshoppers

External image
- Images at iNaturalist

Coptotettix is a genus of Asian groundhoppers (Orthoptera: Caelifera), now placed incertae sedis in the subfamily Tetriginae; it was erected by Ignacio Bolívar in 1887.

Species have been recorded from Africa, Asia (India, Sri Lanka, southern China, Indo-China, Malesia) and eastern Australia.

== Species ==
Gupta and Chandra provide a key to species. The Orthoptera Species File lists:

1. Coptotettix acutiangulus Zha, 2016
2. Coptotettix alfurus Günther, 1937
3. Coptotettix annandalei Hancock, 1915
4. Coptotettix asperatus Bolívar, 1887 - type species
5. Coptotettix bannaensis Zheng, 2006
6. Coptotettix beihaiensis Deng & Zheng, 2006
7. Coptotettix bilineatus Bolívar, 1905
8. Coptotettix brachynotus Deng, Zheng & Wei, 2007
9. Coptotettix brachypterus Zheng, Lin & Zhang, 2013
10. Coptotettix cangshanensis Zheng, Nie & He, 2005
11. Coptotettix capitatus Bolívar, 1887
12. Coptotettix coniopticus (Hancock, 1915)
13. Coptotettix conspersus Hancock, 1915
14. Coptotettix curvimarginus Zheng, Shi & Luo, 2003
15. Coptotettix darlingtoni Rehn, 1952
16. Coptotettix diyalensis Ingrisch & Garai, 2001
17. Coptotettix fangchengensis Zheng & Jiang, 2002
18. Coptotettix ferrugineus Bolívar, 1887
19. Coptotettix fossulatus Bolívar, 1887
20. Coptotettix fretorum Rehn, 1952
21. Coptotettix fuliginosus Bolívar, 1887
22. Coptotettix fuscus Bolívar, 1887
23. Coptotettix gibbus (Sjöstedt, 1936)
24. Coptotettix gongshanensis Zheng, 1992
25. Coptotettix guangzhouensis Zheng, 2012
26. Coptotettix guinanensis Deng & Zheng, 2006
27. Coptotettix hancocki (Kirby, 1910)
28. Coptotettix hancockus Shishodia & Varshney, 1987
29. Coptotettix hechiensis Zheng & Deng, 2004
30. Coptotettix huanjiangensis Zheng & Jiang, 1994
31. Coptotettix indicus Hancock, 1912
32. Coptotettix interruptus Bolívar, 1887
33. Coptotettix jianfengensis Zheng, 2012
34. Coptotettix korbensis Gupta & Chandra, 2017
35. Coptotettix lacernosus Rehn, 1952
36. Coptotettix latifemurus Zheng & Ou, 2010
37. Coptotettix latifrons Brunner von Wattenwyl, 1893
38. Coptotettix lohitensis Shishodia, 1991
39. Coptotettix longjiangensis Zheng & Wei, 2000
40. Coptotettix longtanensis Zheng & Jiang, 2004
41. Coptotettix maesoi Bolívar, 1887
42. Coptotettix magedhensis Gupta & Chandra, 2017
43. Coptotettix manipurensis Shishodia, 1991
44. Coptotettix mastrucatus Rehn, 1952
45. Coptotettix mazarredoi Bolívar, 1887
46. Coptotettix minhouensis Zheng & Li, 2001
47. Coptotettix minutus Bolívar, 1905
48. Coptotettix modiglianii Bolívar, 1898
49. Coptotettix nigrifemurus Deng & Jiang, 2017
50. Coptotettix nodulosus Bolívar, 1887
51. Coptotettix orthomarginis Zheng, 2012
52. Coptotettix parabrachypterus Zheng, 2014
53. Coptotettix parvus Hancock, 1907
54. Coptotettix planus Bolívar, 1887
55. Coptotettix problematicus Bolívar, 1909
56. Coptotettix prominenmarginis Wei, Zheng & Deng, 2007
57. Coptotettix quinquecarinatus (Sjöstedt, 1932)
58. Coptotettix retractus Hancock, 1915
59. Coptotettix rotundatus Hancock, 1907
60. Coptotettix rufipes Bolívar, 1887
61. Coptotettix rupticosta Zheng & Ou, 2004
62. Coptotettix sauteri Günther, 1941
63. Coptotettix spicupennis Zeng & Zheng, 2010
64. Coptotettix strigatus Rehn, 1952
65. Coptotettix testaceus Bolívar, 1887
66. Coptotettix torulidosalis Ou, 2011
67. Coptotettix transimaculatus Zheng & Jiang, 2002
68. Coptotettix tricarinatus Shishodia, 1991
69. Coptotettix tuberculatus Bolívar, 1887
70. Coptotettix undulatimarginis Zheng, Nie & He, 2005
71. Coptotettix zaujiangensis Zheng & Jiang, 2006
