= Xistrella =

Scientific classification
- Kingdom: Animalia
- Phylum: Arthropoda
- Class: Insecta
- Order: Orthoptera
- Suborder: Caelifera
- Family: Tetrigidae
- Tribe: Xistrellini
- Genus: Xistrella; Bolívar, 1909

Synonyms
- Clivitettix Yin, 1984; Pseudogignotettix Liang, 1990; Xistrelia [sic] Bolívar, 1909

Genus of Caelifera

External image
- Images at iNaturalist

Xistrella is a genus of Asian groundhoppers (Orthoptera: Caelifera); originally erected by Ignacio Bolívar in 1909, it is now the type genus of the new (2025) tribe Xistrellini. The (possibly incomplete) recorded species distribution includes the Indian subcontinent, Sri Lanka, China, parts of Indochina, and western Malesia including the Philippines.

== Species ==
The Orthoptera Species File lists:

1. Xistrella acuteterminata (Brunner von Wattenwyl, 1893)
2. Xistrella arorai Shishodia, 1991
3. Xistrella aruna Ingrisch, 2001
4. Xistrella bannaensis (Deng, Wang, Mao & Li, 2022)
5. Xistrella brachynota (Li, Deng & Zheng, 2014)
6. Xistrella cambodia (Storozhenko, 2021)
7. Xistrella cliva Zheng & Liang, 1991
8. Xistrella dengi Skejo, Kasalo, Tumbrinck & Storozhenko, 2025
9. Xistrella dohrni Günther, 1939
10. Xistrella dromadaria Bolívar, 1909 – type species
11. Xistrella dubia (Brunner von Wattenwyl, 1893)
12. Xistrella emeiensis (Zheng, 1995)
13. Xistrella foliolata (Liang & Chen, 2010)
14. Xistrella guangdongensis (Liang, 1990)
15. Xistrella hainanensis Deng, 2019
16. Xistrella hunanensis Wang, 1999
17. Xistrella javanensis (Günther, 1937)
18. Xistrella jiulianshanensis (Zheng & Shi, 2009)
19. Xistrella laticorna (Zheng, 1988)
20. Xistrella lativertex (Zheng & Mao, 2010)
21. Xistrella lochengensis (Zheng, 2005)
22. Xistrella longidorsalis (Liang & Jiang, 2004)
23. Xistrella medogensis (Zheng, 2005)
24. Xistrella motuoensis (Yin, 1984)
25. Xistrella nigriabdominis (Deng, 2022)
26. Xistrella nigrinota (Zheng & Xu, 2010)
27. Xistrella nigritibialis (Zheng & Jiang, 2002)
28. Xistrella ophthalmica (Bolívar, 1909)
29. Xistrella orchotibia (Deng, Wang, Mao & Li, 2022)
30. Xistrella parvula (Liang & Chen, 2010)
31. Xistrella shilinensis (Zheng, 2015)
32. Xistrella siangensis Shishodia, 1991
33. Xistrella strictivertex (Zheng & Ou, 2010)
34. Xistrella stylata (Hancock, 1907)
35. Xistrella wuyishana Zheng & Liang, 1991
36. Xistrella wuyishanensis (Zheng & Zeng, 2011)
37. Xistrella zhengi (Deng, 2024)
