= Pseudoxistrella =

Scientific classification
- Kingdom: Animalia
- Phylum: Arthropoda
- Class: Insecta
- Order: Orthoptera
- Suborder: Caelifera
- Superfamily: Tetrigoidea
- Family: Tetrigidae
- Tribe: Xistrellini
- Genus: Pseudoxistrella; Liang, 1991

Genus of Caelifera

External image
- Images at iNaturalist

Pseudoxistrella is a genus of Asian ground-hoppers (Orthoptera: Caelifera) now placed in the tribe Xistrellini; it was erected by Ge-Qiu Liang in 1991.

== Species ==
Pseudoxistrella currently includes:

1. Pseudoxistrella belokobylskii Storozhenko & Omelko, 2012 - Vietnam
2. Pseudoxistrella eurymera Liang, 1991 - type species, locality Hainan Island
