= Miriatroides =

Scientific classification
- Kingdom: Animalia
- Phylum: Arthropoda
- Class: Insecta
- Order: Orthoptera
- Suborder: Caelifera
- Family: Tetrigidae
- Subfamily: Metrodorinae
- Tribe: Cleostratini
- Genus: Miriatroides; Zheng & Jiang, 2002

Genus of Caelifera

External image
- Images at iNaturalist

Miriatroides is a genus of Asian ground-hoppers (Orthoptera: Caelifera) now placed in the subfamily Criotettiginae (no tribe assigned); it was erected by Z. Zheng and G. Jiang in 2002. The recorded distribution (probably incomplete) for species in this genus is western China, India, Vietnam and Sulawesi.

== Species ==
The Orthoptera Species File lists:

1. Miriatroides gravelyi (Günther, 1939)
2. Miriatroides hainanensis (Günther, 1939) - type species (as M. quadrivertex Zheng, Z. & G. Jiang: originally placed in Spadotettix by Günther)
3. Miriatroides heinrichi (Günther, 1937)
4. Miriatroides kannackiensis Storozhenko, 2016
5. Miriatroides luna Tan & Storozhenko, 2023
6. Miriatroides subansiriensis (Shishodia, 1991)
