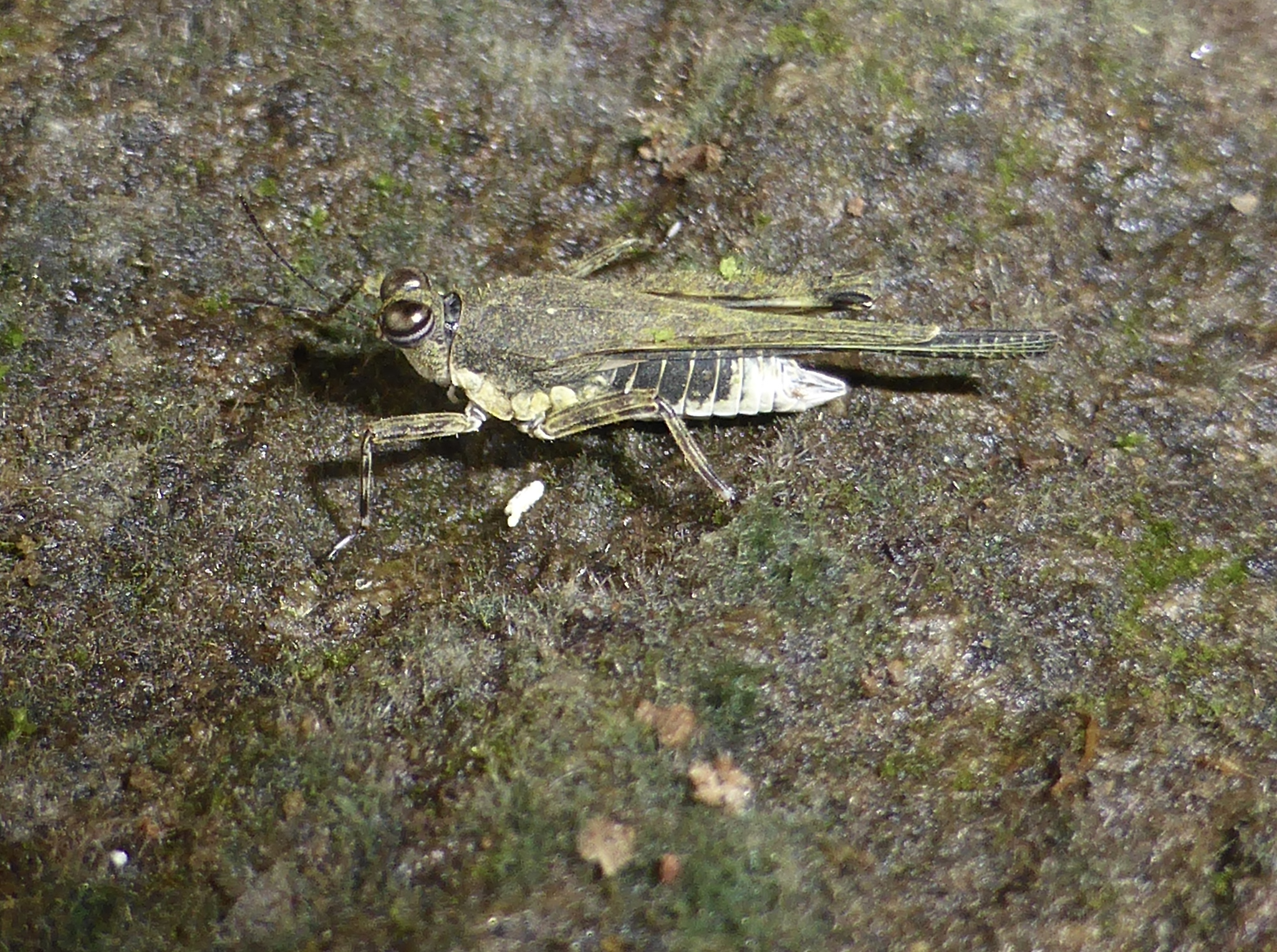
- Systolederus carli

Scientific classification
- Kingdom: Animalia
- Phylum: Arthropoda
- Class: Insecta
- Order: Orthoptera
- Suborder: Caelifera
- Family: Tetrigidae
- Tribe: Xistrellini
- Genus: Systolederus; Bolívar, 1887

Synonyms
- Systoloderus [sic] Bolívar, 1887

= Systolederus =

Genus of Caelifera

Systolederus is a genus of Asian groundhoppers (Orthoptera: Caelifera) in the new (2025) tribe Xistrellini, erected by Ignacio Bolívar in 1887 The recorded species distribution includes the Indian subcontinent, Sri Lanka, China, Japan, Indochina, Malesia through to New Guinea.

== Species ==
The Orthoptera Species File lists:

1. Systolederus abbreviatus Shishodia, 1991
2. Systolederus affinis Günther, 1936
3. Systolederus albimarginus (Zheng & Zhou, 1996)
4. Systolederus angusticeps (Stål, 1877)
5. Systolederus aspinus Deng, 2019
6. Systolederus bashanensis (Zheng, 1993)
7. Systolederus bhattacharyai (Shishodia, 1991)
8. Systolederus bidentatus (Zheng, Huo & Zhang, 2000)
9. Systolederus bipulvillus (Zheng, 2006)
10. Systolederus boettcheri Günther, 1939
11. Systolederus brachinota (Zheng & Xu, 2010)
12. Systolederus brachinotoides (Zheng, Ou & Lin, 2012)
13. Systolederus camurimarginus (Zheng, 1998)
14. Systolederus carli Bolívar, 1909
15. Systolederus carmichaeli (Hancock, 1915)
16. Systolederus chiangraiensis (Zha & Hyde, 2016)
17. Systolederus choui Liang & Jia, 2012
18. Systolederus cinereus Brunner von Wattenwyl, 1893
19. Systolederus combfemorus (Zha & Hyde, 2016)
20. Systolederus ebenotus (Zheng & Li, 2001)
21. Systolederus emeiensis Zheng, 1998
22. Systolederus eurylobatus (Zheng, Shi & Mao, 2010)
23. Systolederus femoralis (Walker, 1871)
24. Systolederus flatimarginus (Zheng & Liang, 2000)
25. Systolederus flavistrial (Zheng, 2006)
26. Systolederus frontalis (Hancock, 1915)
27. Systolederus fujianensis Zheng, 1993
28. Systolederus gravelyi Günther, 1939
29. Systolederus greeni Bolívar, 1902
30. Systolederus guangxiensis Zheng, 1998
31. Systolederus guizhouensis (Zheng, 1993)
32. Systolederus guposhanensis Deng, Zheng & Wei, 2007
33. Systolederus haani Bolívar, 1887 – type species (by subsequent designation)
34. Systolederus hainanensis (Zheng, 1993)
35. Systolederus heishidingensis Zheng & Xie, 2004
36. Systolederus hunanensis Zheng, 2013
37. Systolederus injucundus Günther, 1937
38. Systolederus japonicus Ichikawa, 1994
39. Systolederus jinshaensis (Zha & Ding, 2017)
40. Systolederus lii Devriese, 2023
41. Systolederus lini Devriese, 2023
42. Systolederus longidorsalis (Zheng, 2015)
43. Systolederus longinota Zheng, 2005
44. Systolederus longipennis Zheng & Jiang, 2005
45. Systolederus longipulvillus (Zheng, 1988)
46. Systolederus nigritibia Zheng, 2005
47. Systolederus nigropennis (Deng, Zheng & Lu, 2013)
48. Systolederus oculatus Zheng & Ou, 2012
49. Systolederus ophthalmicus Bolívar, 1887
50. Systolederus orthonotus Zheng, 1998
51. Systolederus oui Devriese, 2023
52. Systolederus parvipulvillus (Deng, Lei & Zheng, 2014)
53. Systolederus parvus Hancock, 1907
54. Systolederus prominemarginis (Zheng & Jiang, 1993)
55. Systolederus rongduensis Devriese, 2023
56. Systolederus siamesicus Günther, 1939
57. Systolederus spicupennis Zheng & Jiang, 2003
58. Systolederus taibeiensis (Zheng & Xu, 2010)
59. Systolederus truncatus (Shishodia, 1991)
60. Systolederus vicinus (Storozhenko, 2019)
61. Systolederus waterstradti Günther, 1939
62. Systolederus wuyishanensis (Zheng, 1993)
63. Systolederus xishuiensis (Zheng, Li & Shi, 2003)
64. Systolederus yuanlingensis Devriese, 2023
65. Systolederus zhengi Devriese, 2023
