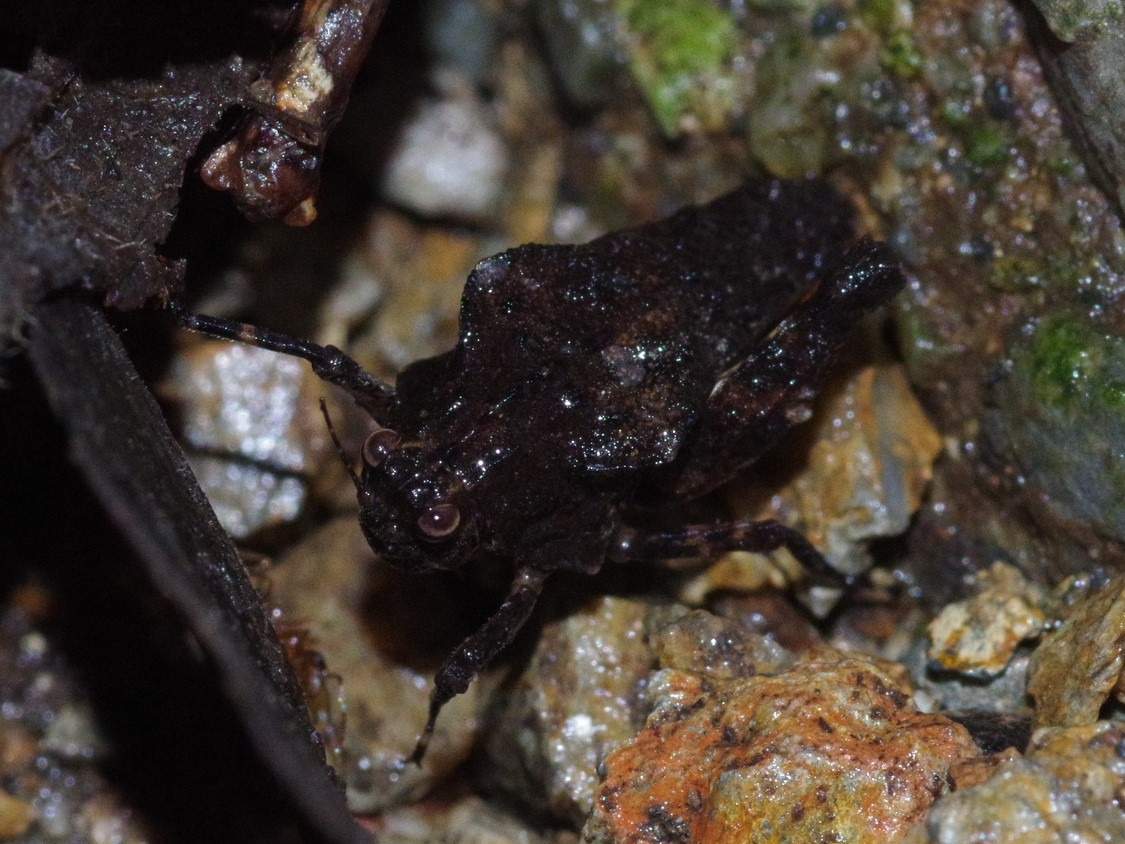
- Austrohancockia okinawensis

Scientific classification
- Kingdom: Animalia
- Phylum: Arthropoda
- Class: Insecta
- Order: Orthoptera
- Suborder: Caelifera
- Family: Tetrigidae
- Subfamily: Scelimeninae
- Tribe: Discotettigini
- Genus: Austrohancockia; Günther, 1938

Synonyms
- Pseudohancockia Zheng & Liang, 1987

= Austrohancockia =

Genus of grasshoppers

Austrohancockia is an Asian genus of ground-hoppers (Orthoptera: Caelifera) in the tribe Discotettigini; species have been recorded from Vietnam, China, Taiwan through to Japan.

== Species ==
Austrohancockia includes the species:

- Austrohancockia albitubercula Deng, 2019
- Austrohancockia fengyangshanensis Zheng & Zhao, 2009
- Austrohancockia gibba Liang & Zheng, 1991
- Austrohancockia grassitti Zheng & Liang, 1987
- Austrohancockia guangxiensis Zheng & Jiang, 1998
- Austrohancockia gutianshanensis Zheng, 1995
- Austrohancockia hubeiensis Zheng, 1992
- Austrohancockia jiugongshanensis Zheng & Zhong, 2005
- Austrohancockia kwangtungensis (Tinkham, 1936) - type species (as Hancockia kwangtungensis Tinkham)
- Austrohancockia latifemora Deng, 2019
- Austrohancockia longidorsalis Zheng, 2008
- Austrohancockia okinawensis Yamasaki, 1994
- Austrohancockia orlovi Storozhenko, 2016
- Austrohancockia platynota Karny, 1915
- Austrohancockia qiyunshanensis Zheng, 1998
- Austrohancockia tuberfemora Deng, Zheng & Wei, 2008
