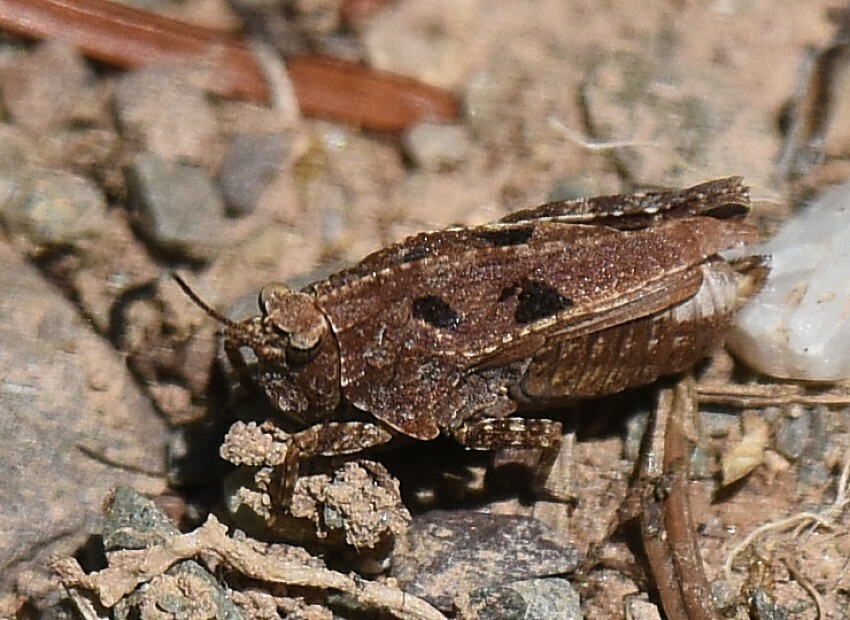
- Nomotettix cristatus

Scientific classification
- Domain: Eukaryota
- Kingdom: Animalia
- Phylum: Arthropoda
- Class: Insecta
- Order: Orthoptera
- Suborder: Caelifera
- Family: Tetrigidae
- Subfamily: Tetriginae
- Genus: Nomotettix; Morse, 1894

= Nomotettix =

Genus of grasshoppers

Nomotettix is a genus of pygmy grasshoppers in the family Tetrigidae. There are at least three described species in Nomotettix.

== Species ==
These three species belong to the genus Nomotettix:

- Nomotettix cristatus (Scudder, 1863) - crested pygmy grasshopper
- Nomotettix parvus Morse, 1895 - low-ridged pygmy grasshopper
- Nomotettix saussurei Bolívar, 1909
