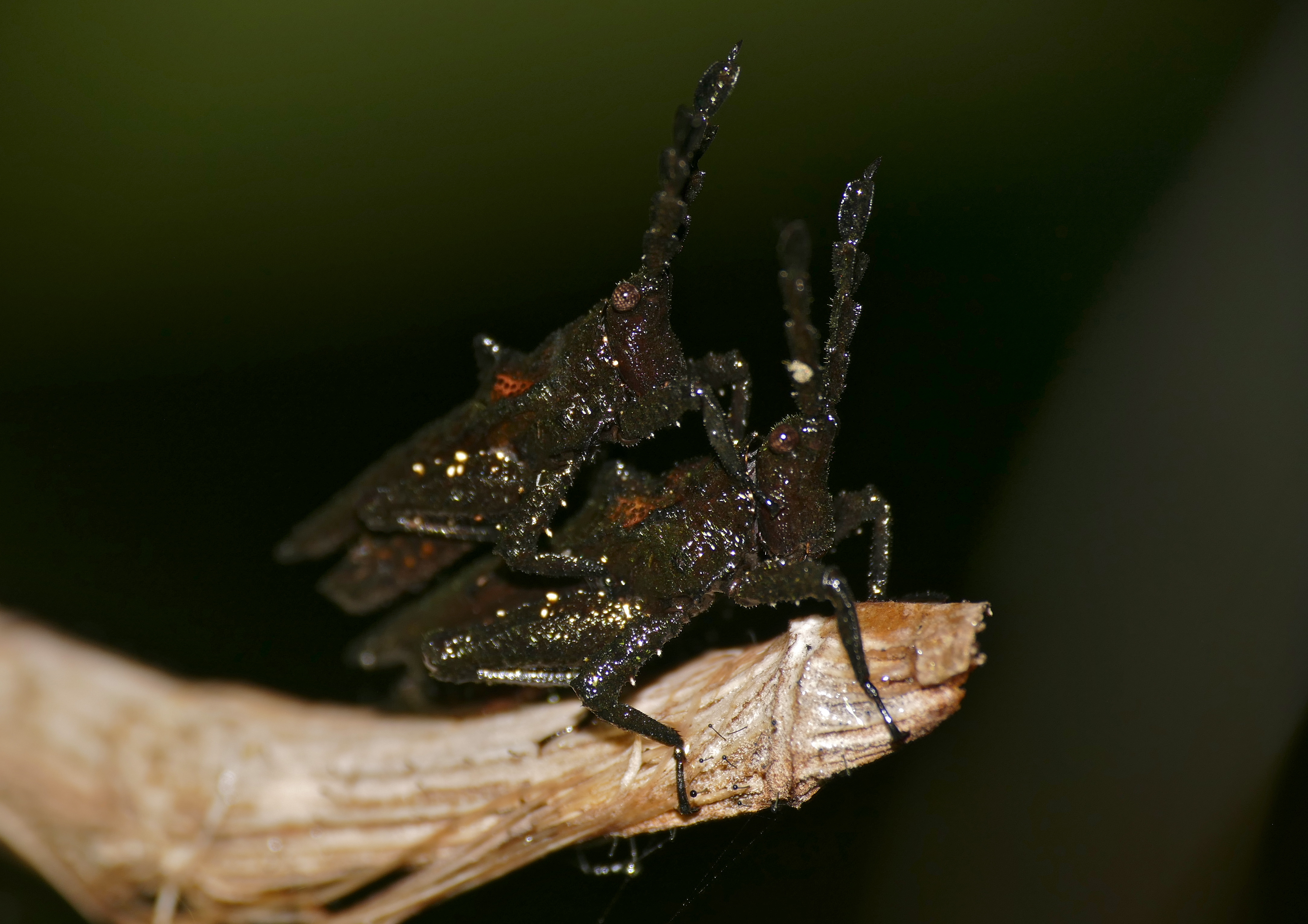
- Tripetalocera ferruginea, mating

Scientific classification
- Domain: Eukaryota
- Kingdom: Animalia
- Phylum: Arthropoda
- Class: Insecta
- Order: Orthoptera
- Suborder: Caelifera
- Infraorder: Acrididea
- Superfamily: Tetrigoidea
- Family: Tetrigidae
- Subfamily: Tripetalocerinae; Bolívar, 1887

Synonyms
- Tripetalocerae Bolívar, 1887; Tripetaloceridae Bolívar, 1887

= Tripetalocerinae =

Subfamily of pygmy grasshoppers

Tripetalocerinae is a subfamily of groundhoppers or pygmy grasshoppers. There are at least two genera and two described species, found in India, China, Indo-China and Malesia.

== Description ==
Groudhoppers in this subfamily are characterised by having relatively very large antennae, but consisting of only eight segments (other Tetrigidae usually have more than 11).

== Genera ==
Two monotypic genera belong to the single tribe Tripetalocerini:

- Tripetalocera Westwood, 1834
- Tripetaloceroides Storozhenko, 2013
