= Prothorax =

Segment of an insect body

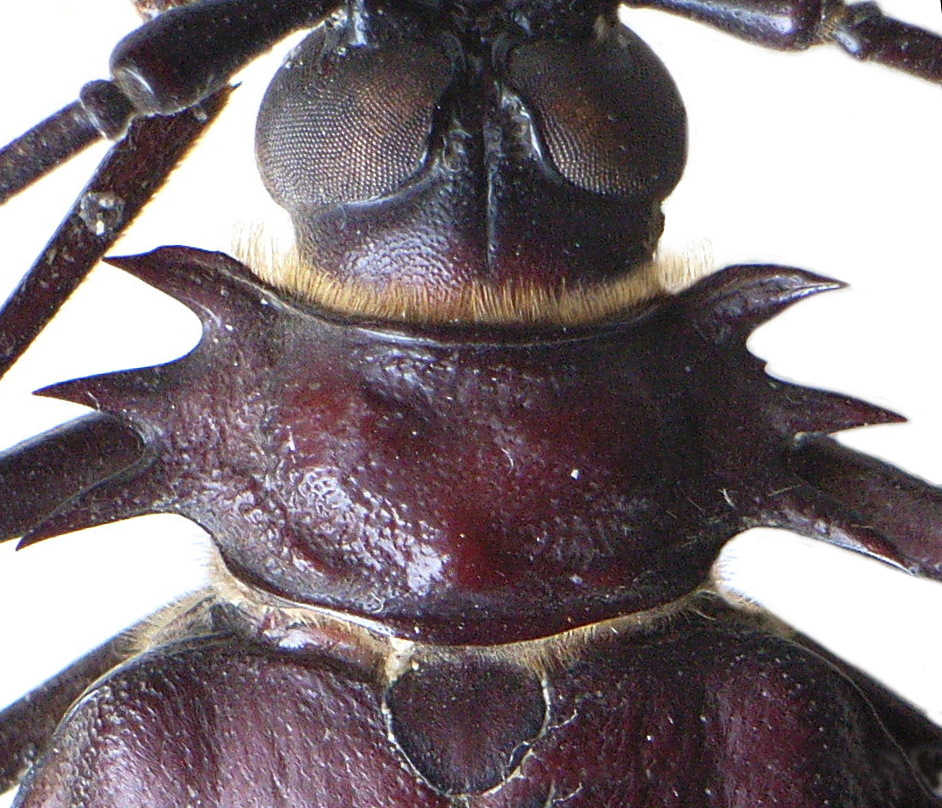
Prothorax of a beetle

The prothorax is the foremost of the three segments in the thorax of an insect, and bears the first pair of legs. Its principal sclerites (exoskeletal plates) are the pronotum (dorsal), the prosternum (ventral), and the propleuron (lateral) on each side. The prothorax never bears wings in extant insects (except in some cases of atavism), though some fossil groups possessed wing-like projections. All adult insects possess legs on the prothorax, though in a few groups (e.g., the butterfly family Nymphalidae) the forelegs are greatly reduced. In many groups of insects, the pronotum is reduced in size, but in a few it is hypertrophied, such as in all beetles (Coleoptera). In most treehoppers (family Membracidae, order Hemiptera), the pronotum is expanded into often fantastic shapes that enhance their camouflage or mimicry. Similarly, in the Tetrigidae, the pronotum is extended backward to cover the flight wings, supplanting the function of the tegmina.

== See also ==
- Glossary of entomology terms
- Insect morphology
- Mesothorax
- Metathorax
- Thorax (insect anatomy)
