= Hedotettix =

Scientific classification
- Domain: Eukaryota
- Kingdom: Animalia
- Phylum: Arthropoda
- Class: Insecta
- Order: Orthoptera
- Suborder: Caelifera
- Family: Tetrigidae
- Tribe: Tetrigini
- Genus: Hedotettix; Bolívar, 1887

Species
- see text

Genus of grasshoppers

Hedotettix is a genus of groundhoppers recorded from Africa through to tropical Asia and Australia, belonging to the tribe Tetrigini (Orthoptera: Caelifera).

== Species ==
The Orthoptera Species File lists:

1. Hedotettix affinis Bolívar, 1887
2. Hedotettix albipalpulus Zheng & Xie, 2000
3. Hedotettix alienus Uvarov, 1936
4. Hedotettix angulatus Gupta, Shi & Chandra, 2016
5. Hedotettix angustatus Hancock, 1909
6. Hedotettix angustifrons Bolívar, 1887
7. Hedotettix antennatus Günther, 1979
8. Hedotettix attenuatus Hancock, 1904
9. Hedotettix bannaensis Zheng, 2014
10. Hedotettix baoshanensis (Zheng, Wei & Liu, 1999)
11. Hedotettix bivalvatus Zheng & Jiang, 2002
12. Hedotettix brachynota Zheng & Ou, 2005
13. Hedotettix brevipennis Zheng & Deng, 2004
14. Hedotettix circinihumerus Deng & Zheng, 2013
15. Hedotettix coactus Bolívar, 1887
16. Hedotettix costatus Hancock, 1912
17. Hedotettix crassipes Karny, 1915
18. Hedotettix cristatus Karny, 1915
19. Hedotettix equestris Navás, 1905
20. Hedotettix eremnotus Zheng & Ou, 2013
21. Hedotettix gracilis (Haan, 1843) - type species (as Acridium gracile Haan)
22. Hedotettix granulatus Bolívar, 1895
23. Hedotettix grossivalva Zheng & Ou, 2005
24. Hedotettix grossus Hancock, 1915
25. Hedotettix guangdongensis Zheng & Xie, 2004
26. Hedotettix guibelondoi Bolívar, 1887
27. Hedotettix hainanensis Zheng, 2014
28. Hedotettix interrupta (Zheng & Mao, 1997)
29. Hedotettix latifemuroides Zheng & Jiang, 2004
30. Hedotettix latifemurus Zheng & Wei, 2005
31. Hedotettix lineifera (Walker, 1871)
32. Hedotettix mainpurensis Gupta & Chandra, 2019
33. Hedotettix notatus (Walker, 1871)
34. Hedotettix nujiangensis Zheng, 2014
35. Hedotettix plana (Walker, 1871)
36. Hedotettix puellus Navás, 1905
37. Hedotettix pulchellus Bolívar, 1887
38. Hedotettix punctatus Hancock, 1909
39. Hedotettix quadriplagiatus (Walker, 1871)
40. Hedotettix rugodorsalis Zheng & Ou, 2013
41. Hedotettix rusticus Bolívar, 1887
42. Hedotettix shangsiensis Zheng & Jiang, 2003
43. Hedotettix sobrinus Bolívar, 1887
44. Hedotettix strictivertex Zheng, 2006
45. Hedotettix torengensis Gupta & Chandra, 2019
46. Hedotettix triangularis Zha & Hyde, 2016
47. Hedotettix tschoffeni Bolívar, 1908
48. Hedotettix xizangensis Zheng & Zeng, 2010
49. Hedotettix xueshanensis Zheng & Ou, 2005
