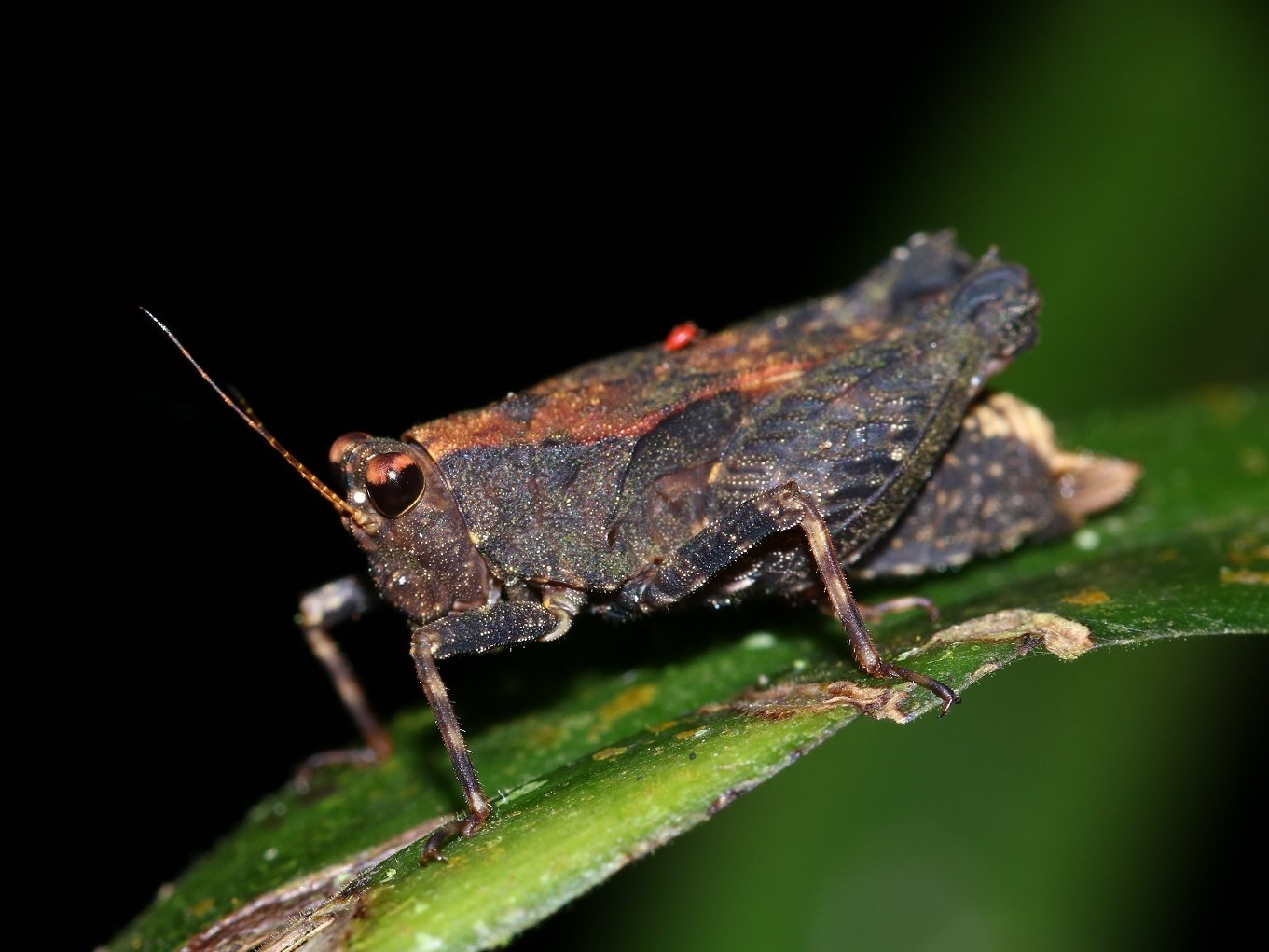
- Bolivaritettix apterus

Scientific classification
- Kingdom: Animalia
- Phylum: Arthropoda
- Clade: Pancrustacea
- Class: Insecta
- Order: Orthoptera
- Suborder: Caelifera
- Superfamily: Tetrigoidea
- Family: Tetrigidae
- Subfamily: Criotettiginae
- Genus: Bolivaritettix; Günther, 1939

= Bolivaritettix =

Genus of grasshoppers

Bolivaritettix is a genus of ground-hoppers in the subfamily Criotettiginae (no tribe assigned). Species of the genus are found in Asia.

== Species ==
The following species are recognised in the genus Bolivaritettix:

- Bolivaritettix acumindentatus Zheng, Shi & Mao, 2010
- Bolivaritettix albus Ingrisch, 2001
- Bolivaritettix amphinotoides Günther, 1939
- Bolivaritettix apterus Rehn, 1904
- Bolivaritettix asperula Bolívar, 1898
- Bolivaritettix brachynotus Zheng, 2003
- Bolivaritettix brevipennis Deng, Zheng & Wei, 2007
- Bolivaritettix celaenotus Zheng, Zhang & Dang, 2009
- Bolivaritettix chinensis Hancock, 1912
- Bolivaritettix chongqingensis Zheng & Shi, 2002
- Bolivaritettix circinihumerus Zheng, 2003
- Bolivaritettix circocephala Zheng, 1992
- Bolivaritettix convergens Brunner von Wattenwyl, 1893
- Bolivaritettix curvicarina Zheng, 2003
- Bolivaritettix darongshanensis Deng, Zheng & Wei, 2009
- Bolivaritettix daweishanensis Deng, Zheng & Wei, 2007
- Bolivaritettix difficilis Günther, 1939
- Bolivaritettix fangjingshanensis Zheng, 1992
- Bolivaritettix fugongensis Zheng & Mao, 2002
- Bolivaritettix fuscoviridis Ingrisch, 2006
- Bolivaritettix galbustrial Zheng, Wei & Li, 2009
- Bolivaritettix gaoligongshanensis Zheng & Ou, 2012
- Bolivaritettix ghumtianus Hancock, 1915
- Bolivaritettix guentheri Ingrisch, 2001
- Bolivaritettix guibeiensis Zheng & Jiang, 1994
- Bolivaritettix guilinensis Deng, Zheng & Wei, 2007
- Bolivaritettix hechiensis Deng, Zheng & Wei, 2008
- Bolivaritettix huanjiangensis Zheng & Jiang, 1995
- Bolivaritettix humeralis Günther, 1939
- Bolivaritettix hutiaoxiana Zheng & Ou, 2003
- Bolivaritettix impennis Günther, 1942
- Bolivaritettix insignis Kirby, 1914
- Bolivaritettix interrupta Zheng & Jiang, 2002
- Bolivaritettix javanicus Bolívar, 1909
- Bolivaritettix jianfengensis Liang, 2002
- Bolivaritettix jinchengjiangensis Zheng, Shi & Mao, 2010
- Bolivaritettix jiuwanshanensis Zheng, 2005
- Bolivaritettix lanceolatus Ingrisch, 2001
- Bolivaritettix laticeps Bolívar, 1909
- Bolivaritettix latipulvilus Zheng, Jiang & Liu, 2005
- Bolivaritettix lativertex Brunner von Wattenwyl, 1893
- Bolivaritettix liboensis Zheng, 2003
- Bolivaritettix liuwanshanensis Deng, Zheng & Wei, 2007
- Bolivaritettix longitarsus Liang, Chen, Chen & Li, 2008
- Bolivaritettix longzhouensis Zheng & Jiang, 1995
- Bolivaritettix luchunensis Liang, Chen, Chen & Li, 2008
- Bolivaritettix luochengensis Ding, Zheng & Wei, 2006
- Bolivaritettix luteolineatus Zheng, 2003
- Bolivaritettix medogensis Zheng, 2005
- Bolivaritettix menglaensis Zheng, 2006
- Bolivaritettix microptera Zheng & Ou, 2003
- Bolivaritettix nathani Wagan & Kevan, 1992
- Bolivaritettix nigrifemurus Deng, Zheng & Wei, 2007
- Bolivaritettix nigripennis Deng, Zheng & Wei, 2007
- Bolivaritettix nigritibialis Zheng, 2002
- Bolivaritettix nigropennis Deng, Zheng & Wei, 2007
- Bolivaritettix nilgirica Hebard, 1930
- Bolivaritettix palawanicus Günther, 1939
- Bolivaritettix paraguensis Günther, 1939
- Bolivaritettix pianmaensis Zheng & Ou, 2003
- Bolivaritettix remissa Bolívar, 1887
- Bolivaritettix rongshuiensis Zheng & Jiang, 2002
- Bolivaritettix roonwali Shishodia, 1991
- Bolivaritettix sanbaishanensis Deng, Zheng & Wei, 2010
- Bolivaritettix sculpta Bolívar, 1887 - type species (as Mazarredia sculpta Bolívar)
- Bolivaritettix serrifemoralis Deng, Zheng & Wei, 2009
- Bolivaritettix shiwanshanensis Deng & Zheng, 2015
- Bolivaritettix sikkinensis Bolívar, 1909
- Bolivaritettix similis Storozhenko, 2018 (Vietnam)
- Bolivaritettix tandoni Shishodia, 1991
- Bolivaritettix tengchongensis Zheng & Ou, 2011
- Bolivaritettix tenuifemura Deng, Zheng & Wei, 2010
- Bolivaritettix torulosinota Zheng, 2005
- Bolivaritettix tridentate Zheng & Ou, 2003
- Bolivaritettix tuberdorsalis Liang, 2002
- Bolivaritettix tubericarina Zheng & Jiang, 1995
- Bolivaritettix unduladorsalis Zheng & Shi, 2009
- Bolivaritettix wuliangshanensis Zheng & Ou, 2003
- Bolivaritettix yuanbaoshanensis Zheng & Jiang, 1995
- Bolivaritettix yuanjiangensis Zheng & Ou, 2010
- Bolivaritettix yunnanensis Zheng & Mao, 2002
- Bolivaritettix zangnanensis Zheng & Shi, 2009
