= Rhopalina =

Scientific classification
- Kingdom: Animalia
- Phylum: Arthropoda
- Class: Insecta
- Order: Orthoptera
- Suborder: Caelifera
- Family: Tetrigidae
- Subfamily: Metrodorinae
- Tribe: Cleostratini
- Genus: Rhopalina; Tinkham, 1939

Synonyms
- Corystotettix Günther, 1939

Genus of Caelifera

Rhopalina is a genus of Asian ground-hoppers (Orthoptera: Caelifera) in the subfamily Criotettiginae; it was erected by Ernest Tinkham in 1939 (no tribe assigned, it was placed previously in the Cleostratini by S.Y. Storozhenko).

== Species and known distribution ==
The Orthoptera Species File lists:

1. Rhopalina bachma Tan & Storozhenko, 2023 – Bạch Mã National Park, Vietnam
2. Rhopalina javana Tinkham, 1939 - type species - Java (locality: Tjitjoerack, "Taluk")
