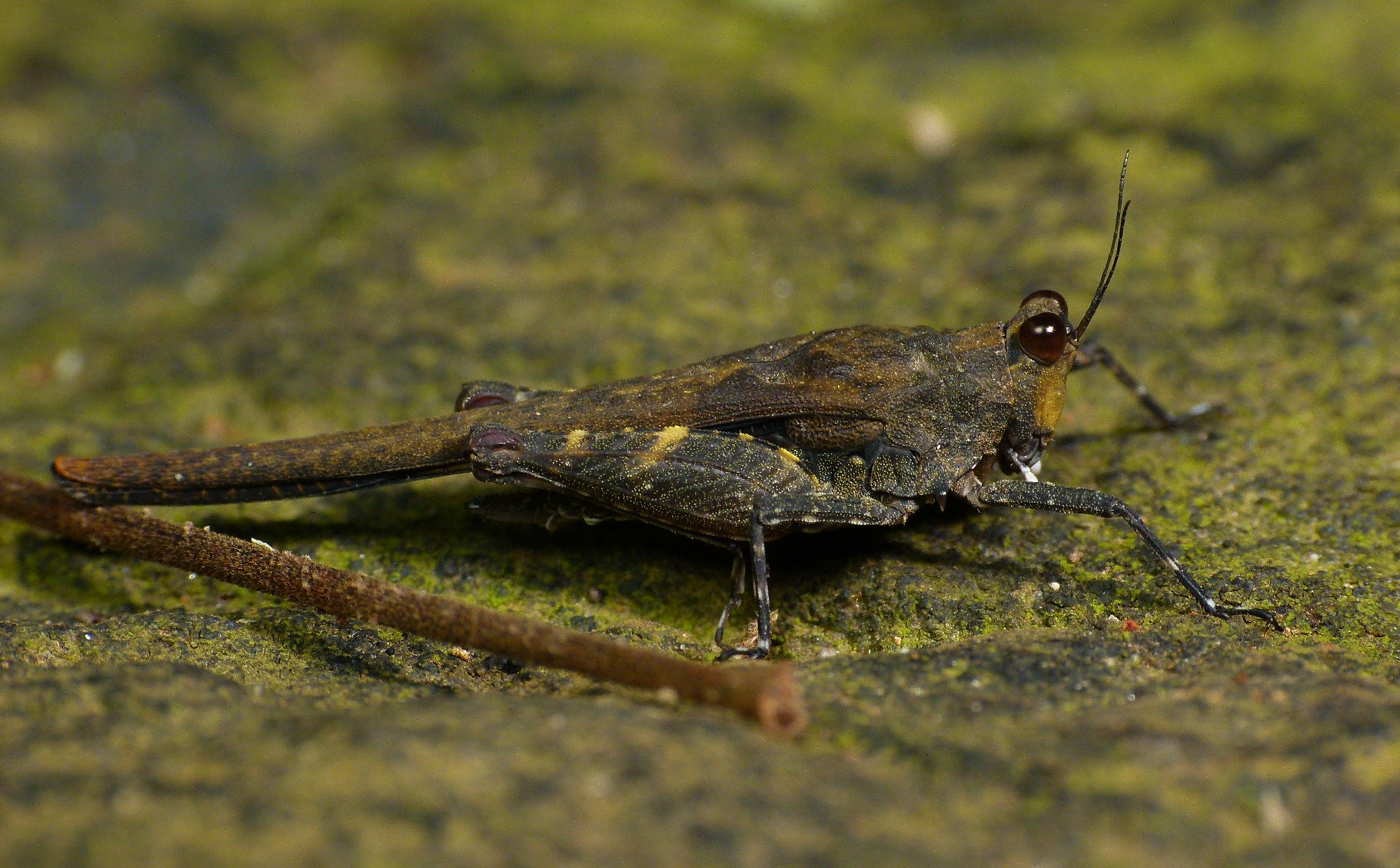
- Criotettix flavopictus

Scientific classification
- Kingdom: Animalia
- Phylum: Arthropoda
- Class: Insecta
- Order: Orthoptera
- Suborder: Caelifera
- Family: Tetrigidae
- Subfamily: Criotettiginae
- Tribe: Criotettigini
- Genus: Criotettix; Bolívar, 1887

= Criotettix =

Genus of Caelifera

Criotettix is an Asian genus of ground-hoppers (Orthoptera: Caelifera) in the tribe Criotettigini.

== Species ==
The Orthoptera Species File includes:

- Criotettix acutipennis Karsch, 1900
- Criotettix afghanus Cejchan, 1969
- Criotettix armigera Walker, 1871
- Criotettix baiseensis Deng, Zheng & Wei, 2006
- Criotettix bannaensis Zheng & Xie, 2000
- Criotettix beihaiensis Wei, Zheng & Deng, 2006
- Criotettix bispinosus Dalman, 1818 - type species (as Acrydium bispinosum Dalman)
- Criotettix borrei Bolívar, 1887
- Criotettix brachynotus Zheng & Jiang, 1994
- Criotettix brevipennis Zheng & Xie, 2002
- Criotettix cliva Wei, Zheng & Deng, 2006
- Criotettix curticornis Hancock, 1915
- Criotettix curvispinus Zheng, 1993
- Criotettix damingshanensis Zheng & Jiang, 1998
- Criotettix fastiditus Bolívar, 1917
- Criotettix fuscus Hancock, 1907
- Criotettix gariyabandicus Gupta & Chandra, 2018
- Criotettix gidhavensis Gupta & Chandra, 2018
- Criotettix guangdongensis Zheng, 2012
- Criotettix guangxiensis Deng, Zheng & Wei, 2006
- Criotettix hainanensis Liang, 2002
- Criotettix handschini Günther, 1937
- Criotettix indicus Bolívar, 1902
- Criotettix inornatus Walker, 1871
- Criotettix interrupta Zheng & Xie, 2002
- Criotettix interruptaoides Deng & Zheng, 2015
- Criotettix interrupticostus Zheng, 2006
- Criotettix japonicus Haan, 1842
- Criotettix latifemurus Deng, Zheng & Wei, 2006
- Criotettix latiferus Walker, 1871
- Criotettix latifrons Hebard, 1930
- Criotettix longinota Wei, Zheng & Deng, 2007
- Criotettix longipennis Liang, 2002
- Criotettix longlingensis Zheng & Ou, 2003
- Criotettix longzhouensis Zheng & Jiang, 2000
- Criotettix miliarius Bolívar, 1887
- Criotettix montanus Hancock, 1912
- Criotettix napoensis Zheng, 2002
- Criotettix nexuosus Bolívar, 1887
- Criotettix nigrifemurus Zheng & Deng, 2004
- Criotettix nigripennis Wei, Zheng & Deng, 2007
- Criotettix nodulosus Stål, 1861
- Criotettix okinawensis Ichikawa, 1994
- Criotettix orientalis Hancock, 1913
- Criotettix pallidus Hancock, 1915
- Criotettix pallitarsis Walker, 1871
- Criotettix robustus Hancock, 1907
- Criotettix ruiliensis Zheng & Ou, 2009
- Criotettix saginatus Bolívar, 1887
- Criotettix shanglinensis Deng, Zheng & Wei, 2007
- Criotettix strictvertex Zheng, Wei & Li, 2009
- Criotettix strictvertexoides Zheng, Wei & Li, 2009
- Criotettix subulatus Bolívar, 1887
- Criotettix telifera Walker, 1871
- Criotettix torulisinotus Zheng, Wei & Liu, 1999
- Criotettix transpinius Zheng & Deng, 2004
- Criotettix triangularis Zheng, 2008
- Criotettix undatifemurus Deng, 2019
- Criotettix vidali Bolívar, 1887
- Criotettix yingjiangensis Zheng & Ou, 2011
- Criotettix yunnanensis Zheng & Ou, 2003
- Criotettix zhejiangensis Zhang, Li & Zhi, 2019
