= Hildegardia (insect) =

Scientific classification
- Kingdom: Animalia
- Phylum: Arthropoda
- Clade: Pancrustacea
- Class: Insecta
- Order: Orthoptera
- Suborder: Caelifera
- Family: Tetrigidae
- Subfamily: Hildegardiinae
- Genus: Hildegardia; Günther, 1974

Genus of grasshoppers

Hildegardia is a genus of insect, belonging to the family Tetrigidae and since 2025 placed in the monogeneric subfamily of Hildegardiinae; it was erected by Klaus Günther in 1974.

The known species of this genus are found in Mauritius and La Réunion.

== Species ==
The Orthoptera Species File includes:

1. Hildegardia mauritiicola Günther, 1974 - (Mauritius)
2. Hildegardia mauritiivaga Günther, 1974 - (Mauritius)
3. Hildegardia reuniivaga Hugel, 2007 - (Réunion)
