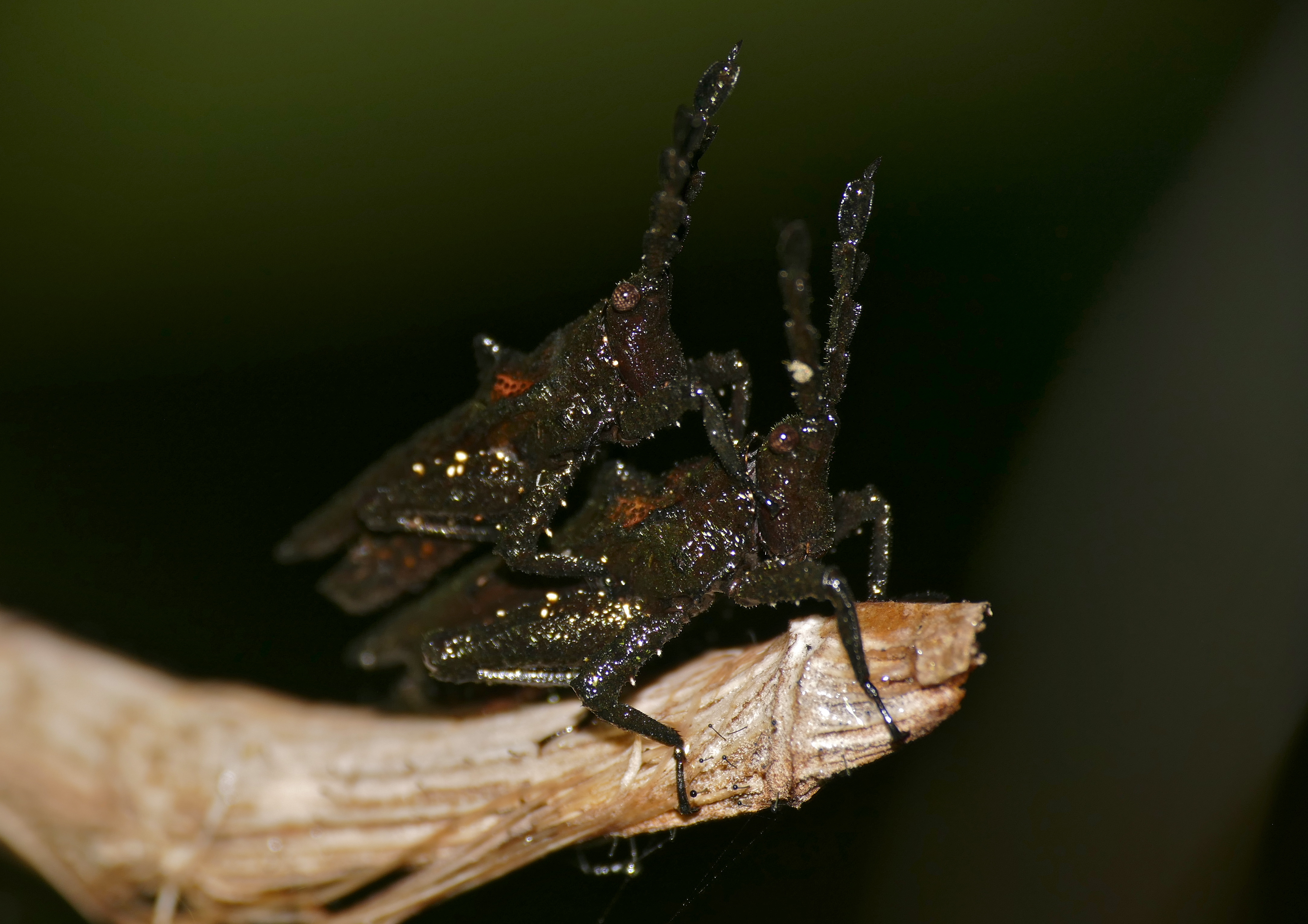
- Tripetalocera ferruginea pair

Scientific classification
- Domain: Eukaryota
- Kingdom: Animalia
- Phylum: Arthropoda
- Class: Insecta
- Order: Orthoptera
- Suborder: Caelifera
- Family: Tetrigidae
- Subfamily: Tripetalocerinae
- Tribe: Tripetalocerini
- Genus: Tripetalocera; Westwood, 1834
- Species: T. ferruginea

Binomial name
- Tripetalocera ferruginea Westwood, 1834

= Tripetalocera =

Genus of Caelifera

Tripetalocera is a genus of Asian groundhoppers (Orthoptera: Caelifera) in the subfamily Tripetalocerinae Bolívar, 1887; the genus was described in 1834 by John Obadiah Westwood.

== Species ==
Tripetalocera is now considered monotypic with Tripetalocera ferruginea Westwood the type species. To date, it has a discontinuous known distribution in western India and Malesia.
