= Joseph L. Hancock =

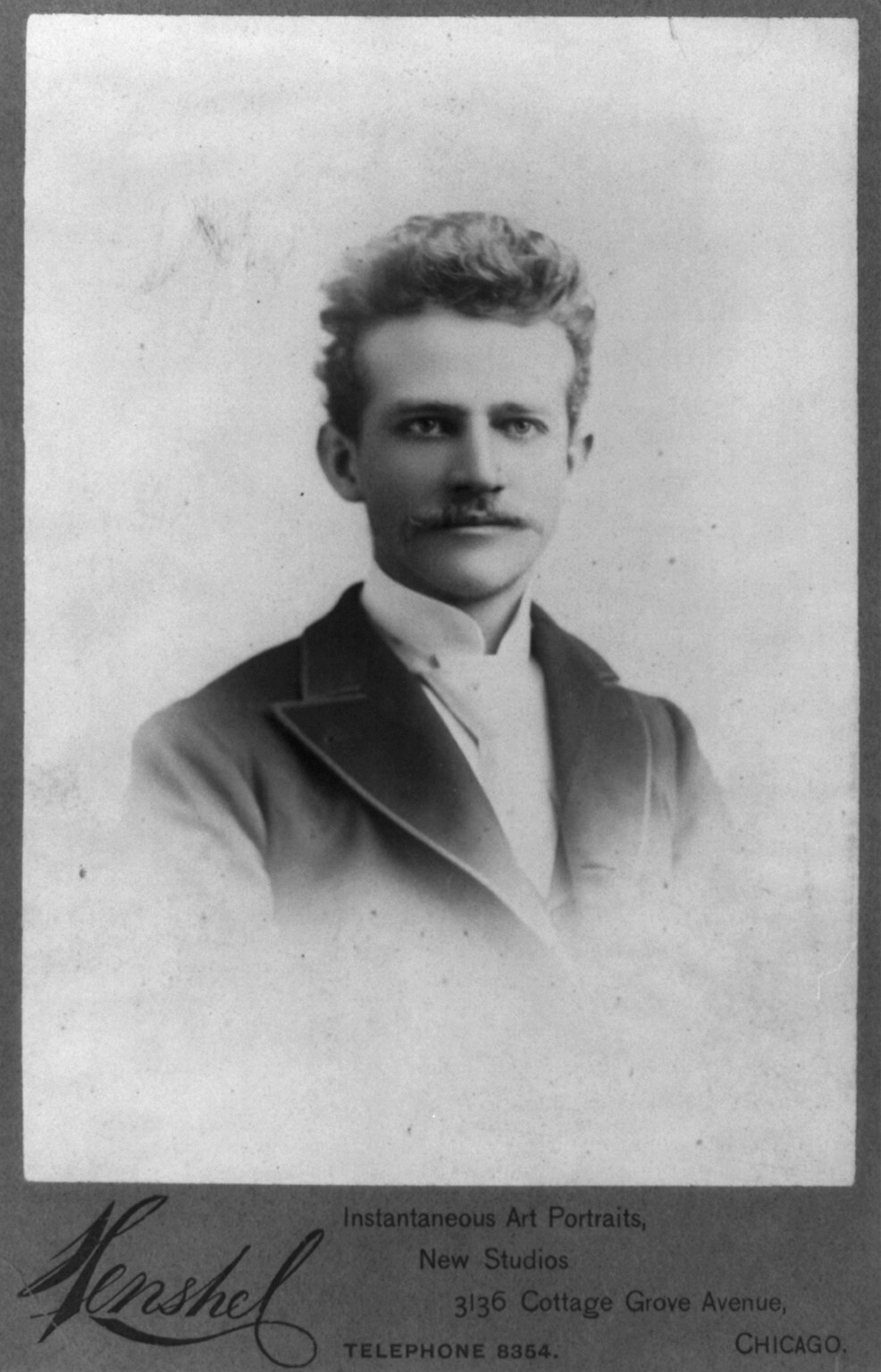
Joseph Lane Hancock
