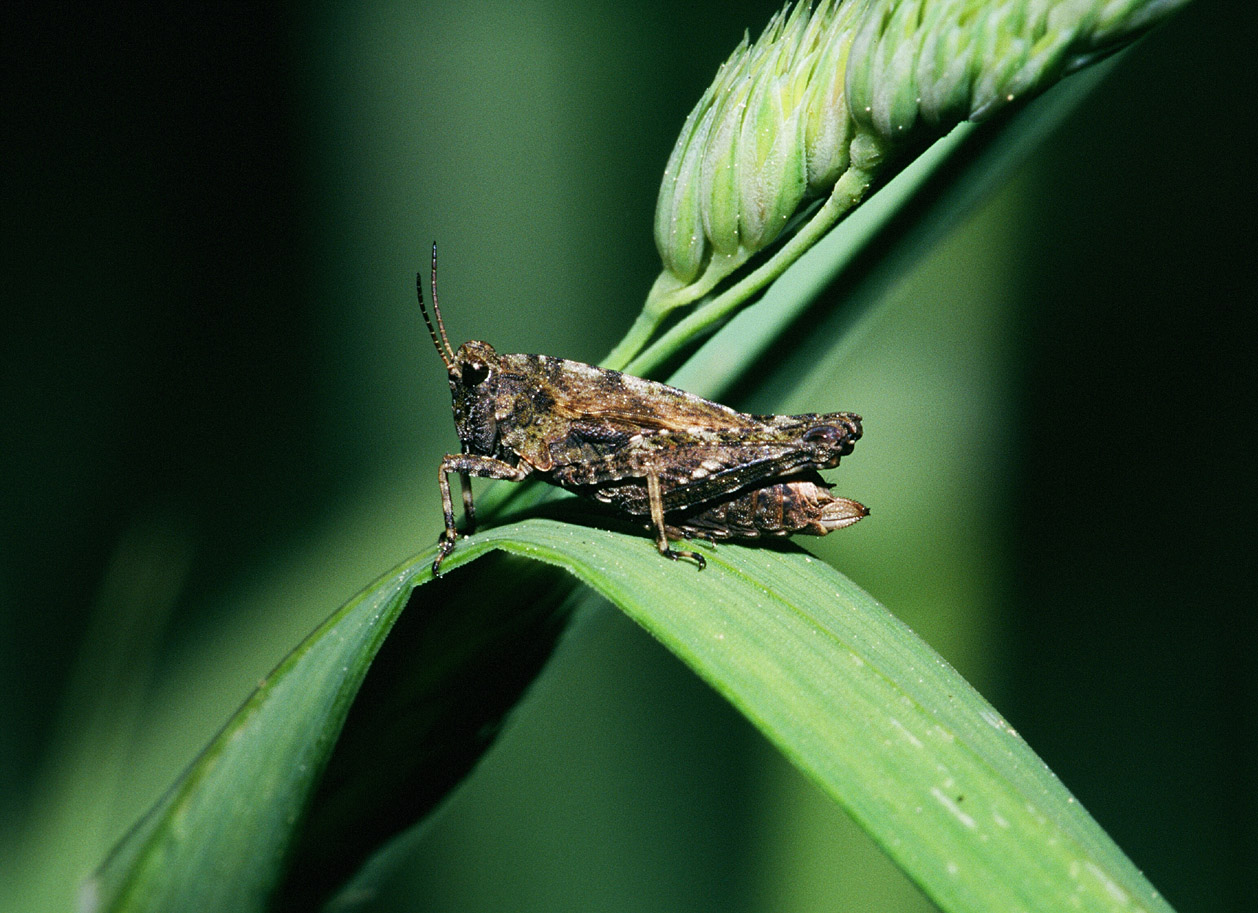
- Tetrix species

Scientific classification
- Kingdom: Animalia
- Phylum: Arthropoda
- Clade: Pancrustacea
- Class: Insecta
- Order: Orthoptera
- Suborder: Caelifera
- Superfamily: Tetrigoidea
- Family: Tetrigidae; Rambur, 1838

Subfamilies
- Batrachideinae; Cladonotinae; Criotettiginae; Guntheritettiginae; Hildegardiinae; Lophotettiginae; Metrodorinae; Scelimeninae (incorporating Discotettiginae); Tetriginae; Tripetalocerinae; unplaced tribes and genera

= Tetrigidae =

Family of Caelifera

Tetrigidae is an ancient family in the order Orthoptera, which also includes similar families such as crickets, grasshoppers, and their allies. Species within the Tetrigidae are variously called groundhoppers, pygmy grasshoppers, pygmy devils or (mostly historical) "grouse locusts".

== Diagnostic characteristics ==
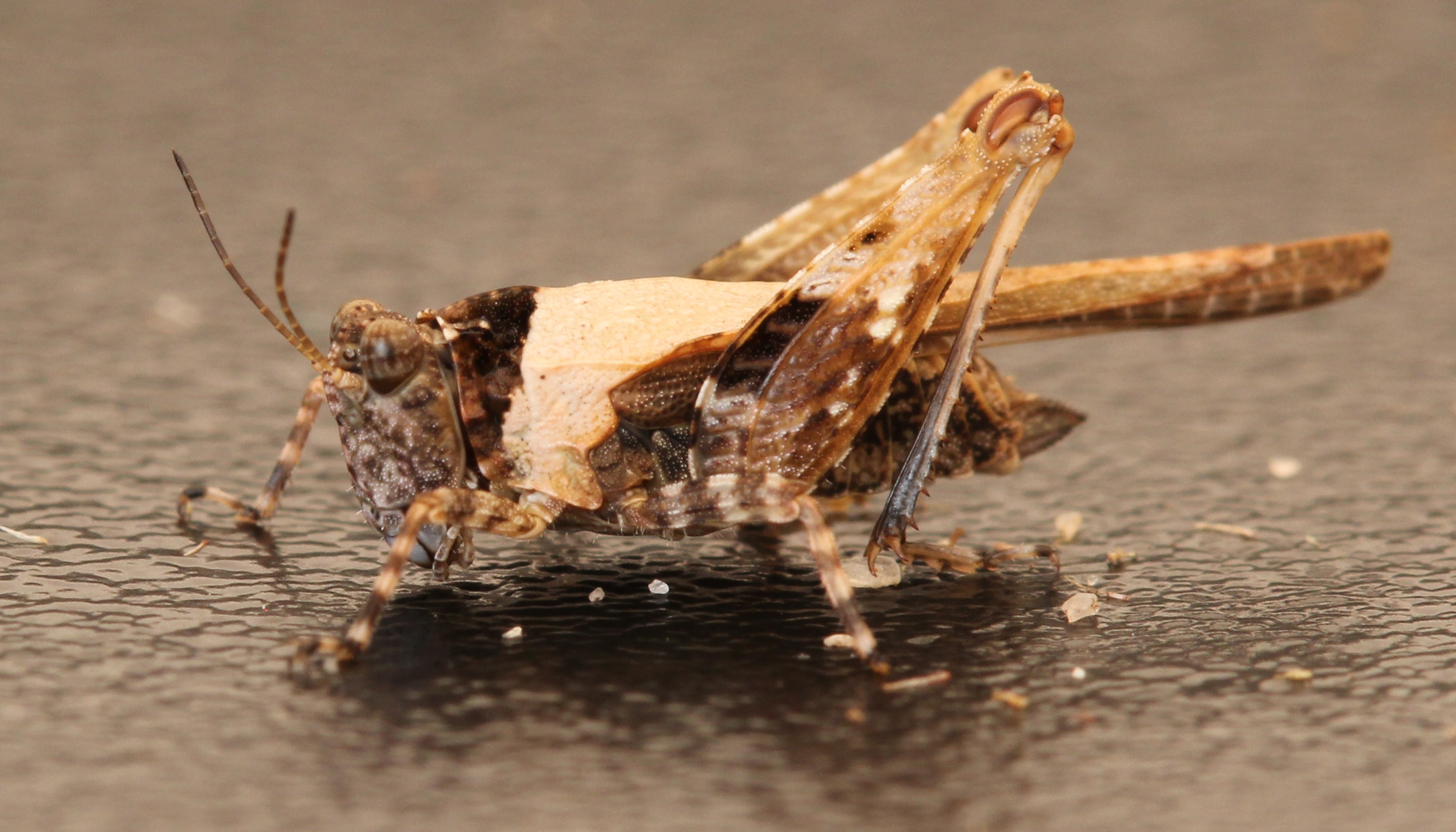
A typical Tetrigid species that commonly inhabits arid banks of water bodies in Southern Africa. Lateral aspect, showing how the pronotum covers the hind-wings. The vestigial tegmen is visible just above the anterior coxa.

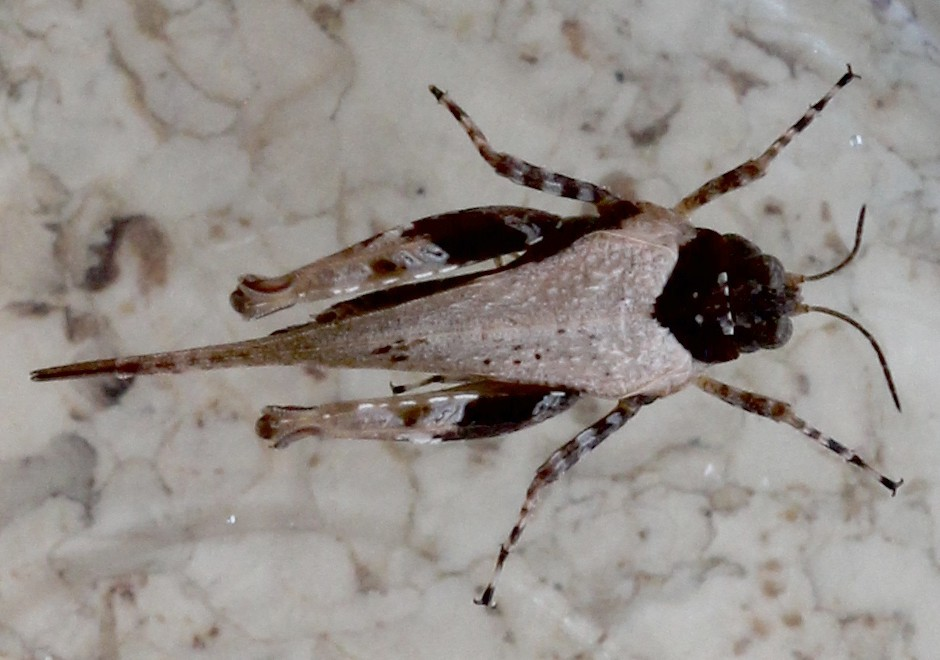
Tetrigidae Dorsal aspect. The same specimen from above. In both pictures note the unusually heavy structure of the posterior femur, and the correspondingly massive pulley-like femoro-tibial joint, similar to the anatomy of the Tridactylidae.

Tetrigidae are typically less than 20 mm (0.79 in) in length and are recognizable by a long pronotum. This pronotum extends over the length of the abdomen, sometimes to the tip of the wings, and ends in a point. In other Orthoptera, the pronotum is short and covers neither the abdomen nor the wings. Tetrigidae are generally cryptic in coloration. Some species have enlarged pronota that mimic leaves, stones or twigs.

Other characteristics pygmy grasshoppers exhibit in comparison to other Orthoptera families are the lack of an arolium between the claws, the first thoracic sternite being modified into collar-like structure called sternomentum, a tarsal formula of 2-2-3, scaly fore -wings, and developed hindwings.

== General biology ==
In temperate regions, Tetrigidae are generally found along streams and ponds, where they feed on algae and diatoms. The North American species Paratettix aztecus and Paratettix mexicanus, for example, depend on aquatic primary production for between 80% and 100% of their diet. Detritus, moss and fungal hyphae also dominates the diet in many species. Riparian species are capable of swimming on the surface of the water, and readily leap into the water when alarmed Some species in the tribe Scelimenini are fully aquatic and capable of swimming underwater.

The highest biodiversity of Tetrigidae is found in tropical forests. Some tropical species are arboreal and live among mosses and lichens in tree buttresses or in the canopy, while others live on the forest floor.

Like other Orthoptera, Tetrigidae have a hemimetabolous development, in which eggs hatch into nymphs. Unlike other temperate Orthoptera, however, temperate Tetrigidae generally overwinter as adults.

Some subfamilies within the Tetrigidae, such as the Batrachideinae, are sometimes elevated to family rank besides the Tetrigidae.

Arulenus miae is a pygmy grasshopper species from the tropical mountainous rainforests of the Philippines. The species was firstly discovered in Facebook post.

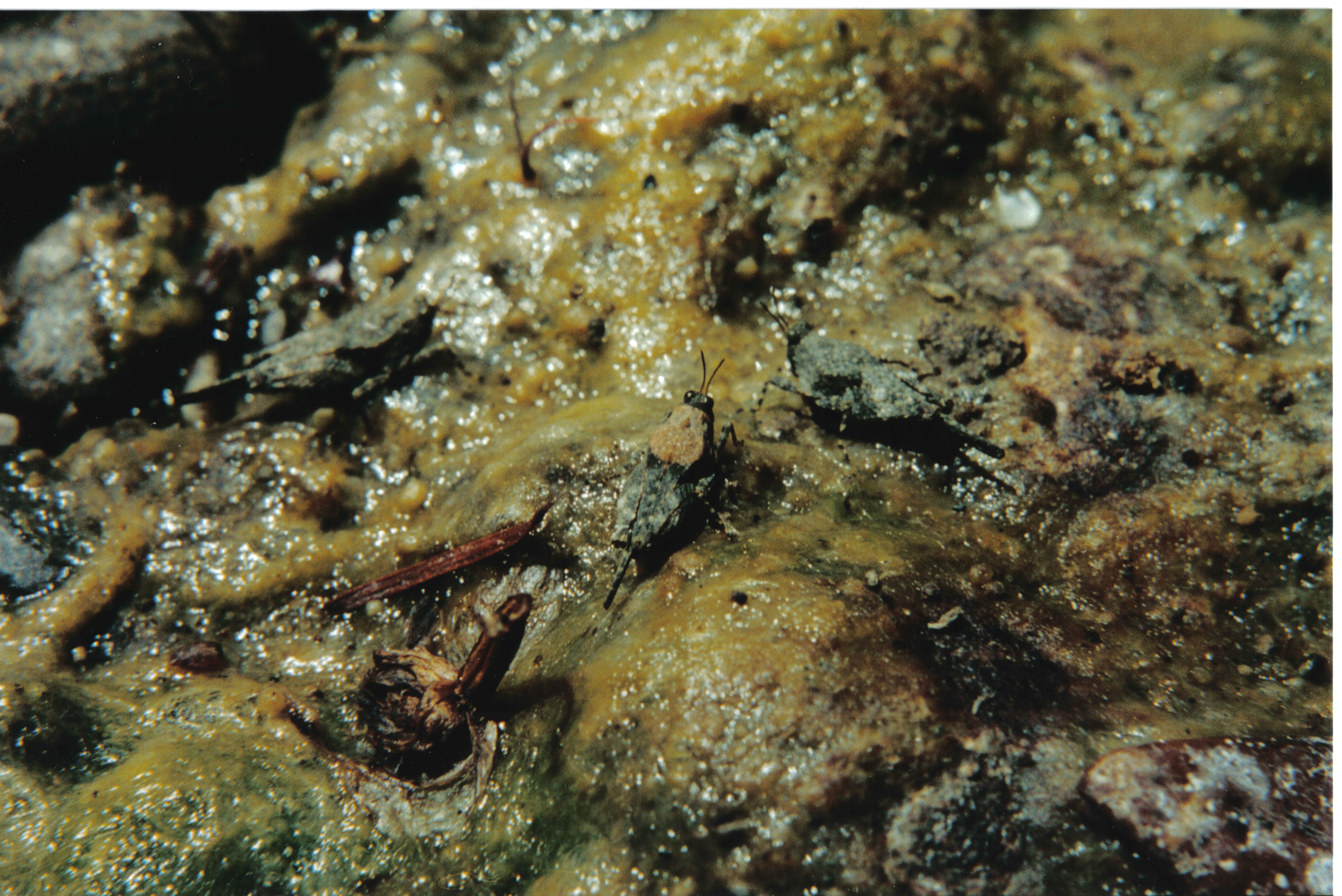
Paratettix aztecus eating algae

== Etymology ==
Origin of the name of the family is not completely clear as there are different sources on its etymology. The name may be derived from Latin tetricus or taetricus, meaning harsh, sour, severe. The name may also originate from the earlier name 'Tettigidae', based on Tettix (synonym of Tetrix), which was preoccupied by Tettigidae (synonym of Cicadidae). Because of the preoccupation by the cicadas' family name, the second 't' in 'tt' was changed into 'r', resulting in the word Tetrigidae.

== Subfamilies, tribes and selected genera ==
More than 320 genera in 10 subfamilies have been described; according to the Orthoptera Species File the following are included:

=== Subfamily Batrachideinae ===
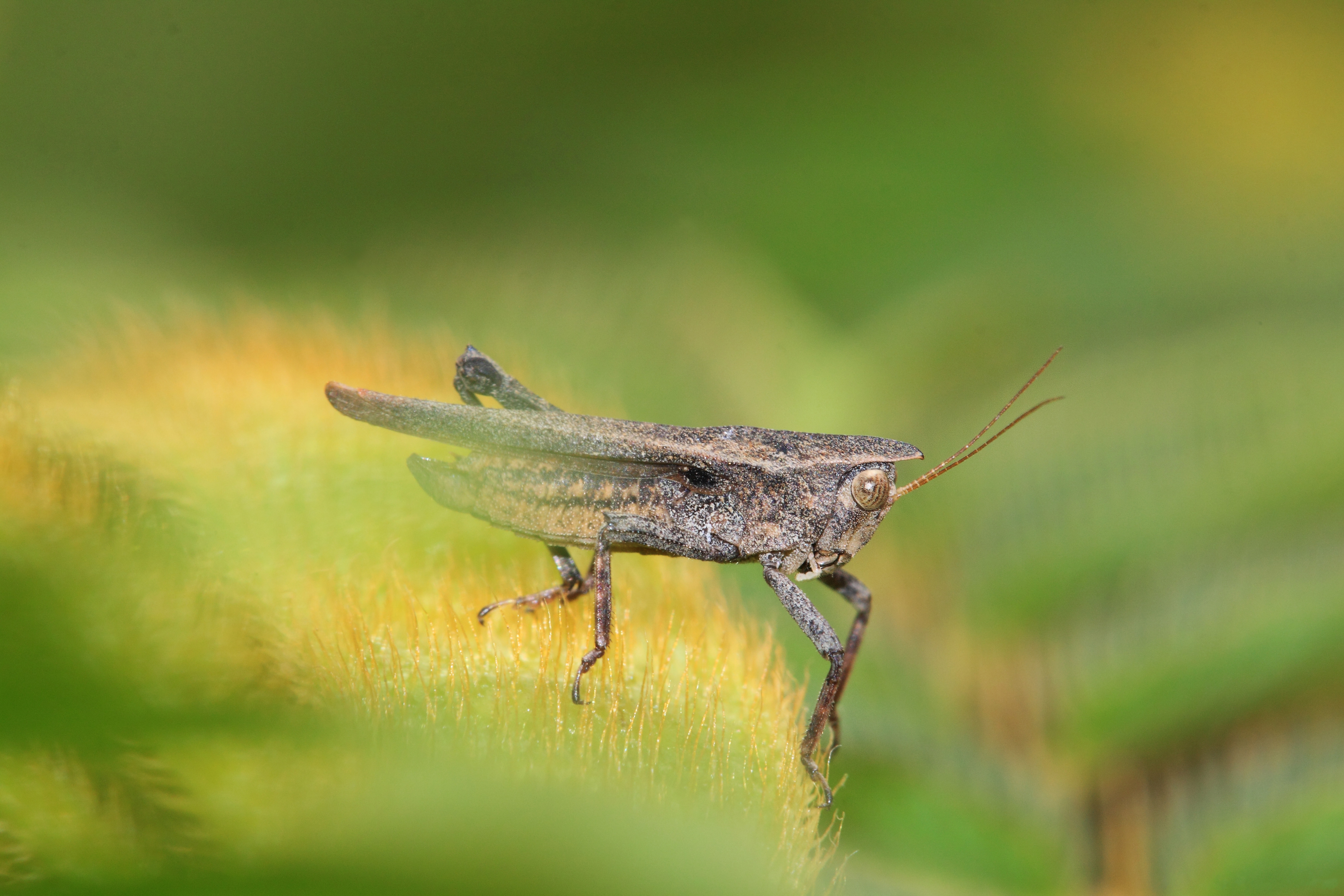
Saussurella cornuta

Auth.: Bolívar, 1887; selected genera:

- Batrachidea Serville, 1838
- Saussurella Bolívar, 1887
- Tettigidea Scudder, 1862

=== Subfamily Cladonotinae ===
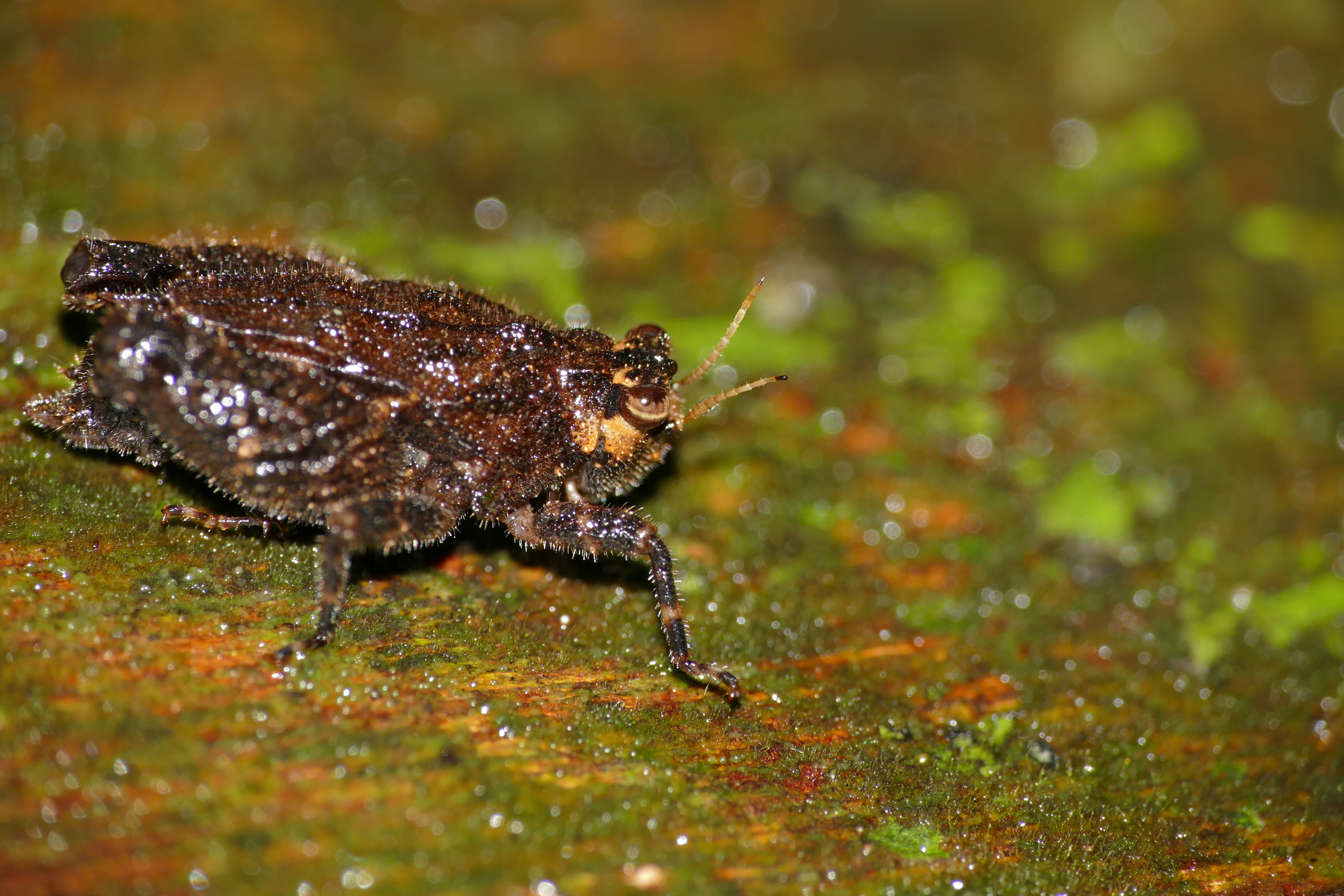
Potua morbillosa (Borneo)

Auth.: Bolívar, 1887; selected genera:

Tribe Cladonotini Bolívar, 1887

- Cladonotus Saussure, 1862
- Deltonotus Hancock, 1904
- Piezotettix Bolívar, 1887

Tribe Choriphyllini Cadena-Castañeda & Silva, 2019

1. Choriphyllum Serville, 1838
2. Phyllotettix Hancock, 1902

Tribe Valalyllini Deranja, Kasalo, Adžić, Franjević & Skejo, 2022

1. Lepocranus Devriese, 1991
2. Valalyllum Deranja, Kasalo, Adžić, Franjević & Skejo, 2022

Tribe Xerophyllini Günther, 1979

SE Asia - selected genera:

- Potua Bolívar, 1887 (genus group)
- Xerophyllum Fairmaire, 1846

Tribe Unassigned

- Austrohancockia Günther, 1938
- Epitettix Hancock, 1907
- Nesotettix Holdhaus, 1909

=== Subfamily Criotettiginae ===
Auth. Kevan, 1966

==== Criotettigini ====
Auth. Kevan, 1966

1. Acanthalobus Hancock, 1904
2. Criotettix Bolívar, 1887
3. Dasyleurotettix Rehn, 1904

==== Thoradontini ====
Auth. Kevan, 1966

1. Aryalidonta Subedi & Kasalo, 2023
2. Eucriotettix Hebard, 1930
3. Loxilobus Hancock, 1904
4. Thoradonta Hancock, 1909
5. Yunnantettix Zheng, 1995

==== Criotettiginae: tribe unassigned ====
1. Afrocriotettix Günther, 1938
2. Amphinotulus Günther, 1939
3. Apterotettix Hancock, 1904
4. Bolivaritettix Günther, 1939
5. Bolotettix Hancock, 1907
6. Cotysoides Zheng & Jiang, 2000
7. Hyboella Hancock, 1915
8. Indomiriatra Tinkham, 1939
9. Miriatroides Zheng & Jiang, 2002
10. Probolotettix Günther, 1939
11. Rhopalina Tinkham, 1939
12. Rostella Hancock, 1913
13. Spadotettix Hancock, 1910
14. Tettitelum Hancock, 1915

=== Subfamily Guntheritettiginae ===
Auth.: Cadena-Castañeda, 2025 - Madagascar & Indian Ocean islands:

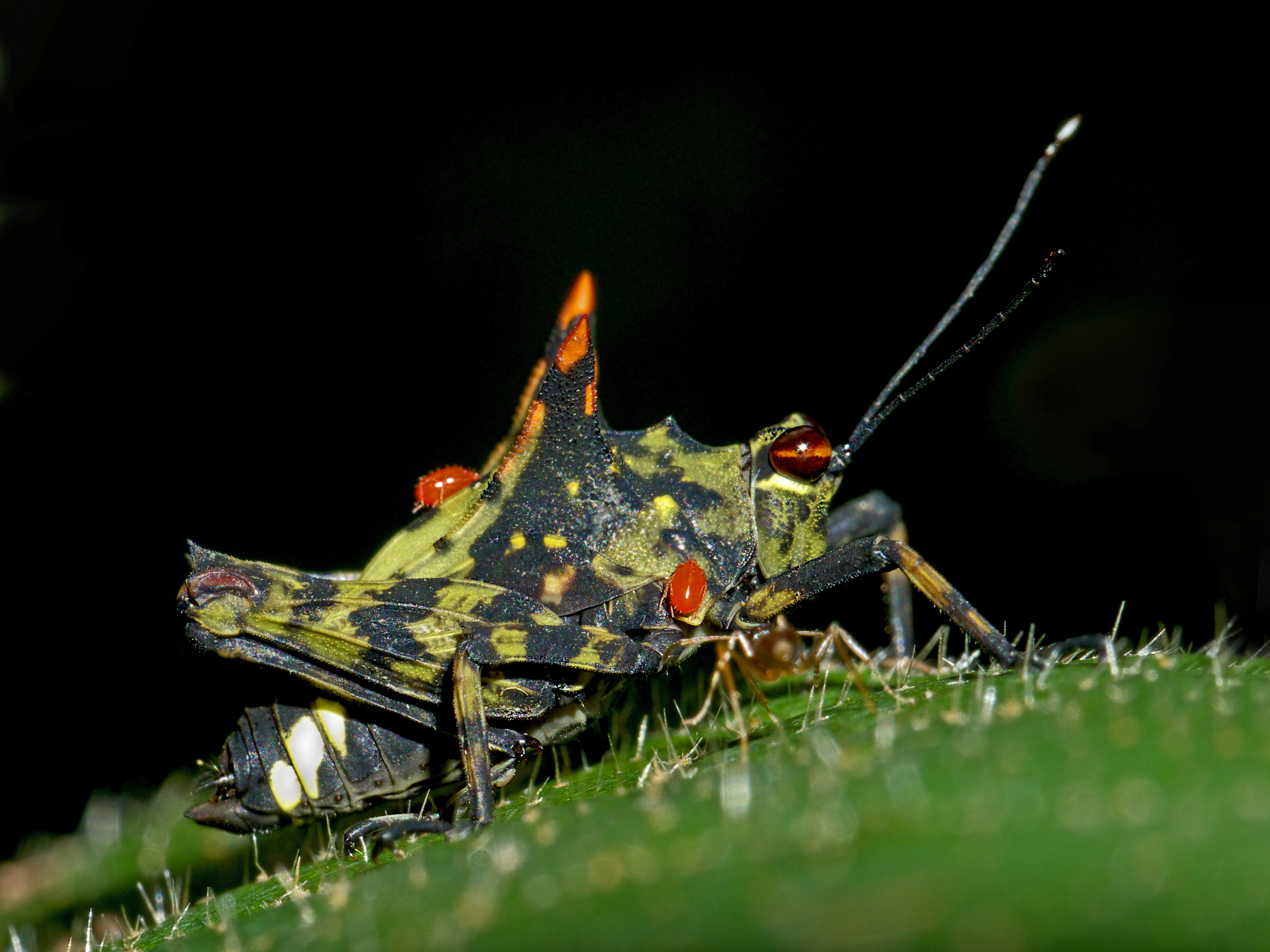
Holocerus (with red mites, Madagascar)

tribe Guntheritettigini Cadena-Castañeda, 2025

- Guntheritettix Cadena-Castañeda & Tavares, 2025: monotypic G. formidabilis (Günther, 1974)
- Holocerus Bolívar, 1887: monotypic Holocerus lucifer (Serville, 1838)

tribe Tumbrinckitettigini Cadena-Castañeda, 2025

- Cryptotettix Hancock, 1900
- Tumbrinckitettix Cadena-Castañeda & Tavares, 2025

Subfamily Hildegardiinae Cadena-Castañeda, 2025 - monogeneric

1. Hildegardia Günther, 1974

=== Subfamily Lophotettiginae ===
Auth.: Hancock, 1909; distribution S. America, genera:

1. Lophotettix Hancock, 1909
2. Phelene Bolívar, 1906

=== Subfamily Metrodorinae ===
Auth.: Bolívar, 1887; selected genera:

Tribe Amorphopini Günther, 1939

- Amorphopus Serville, 1838

Tribe Cleostratini Hancock, 1907

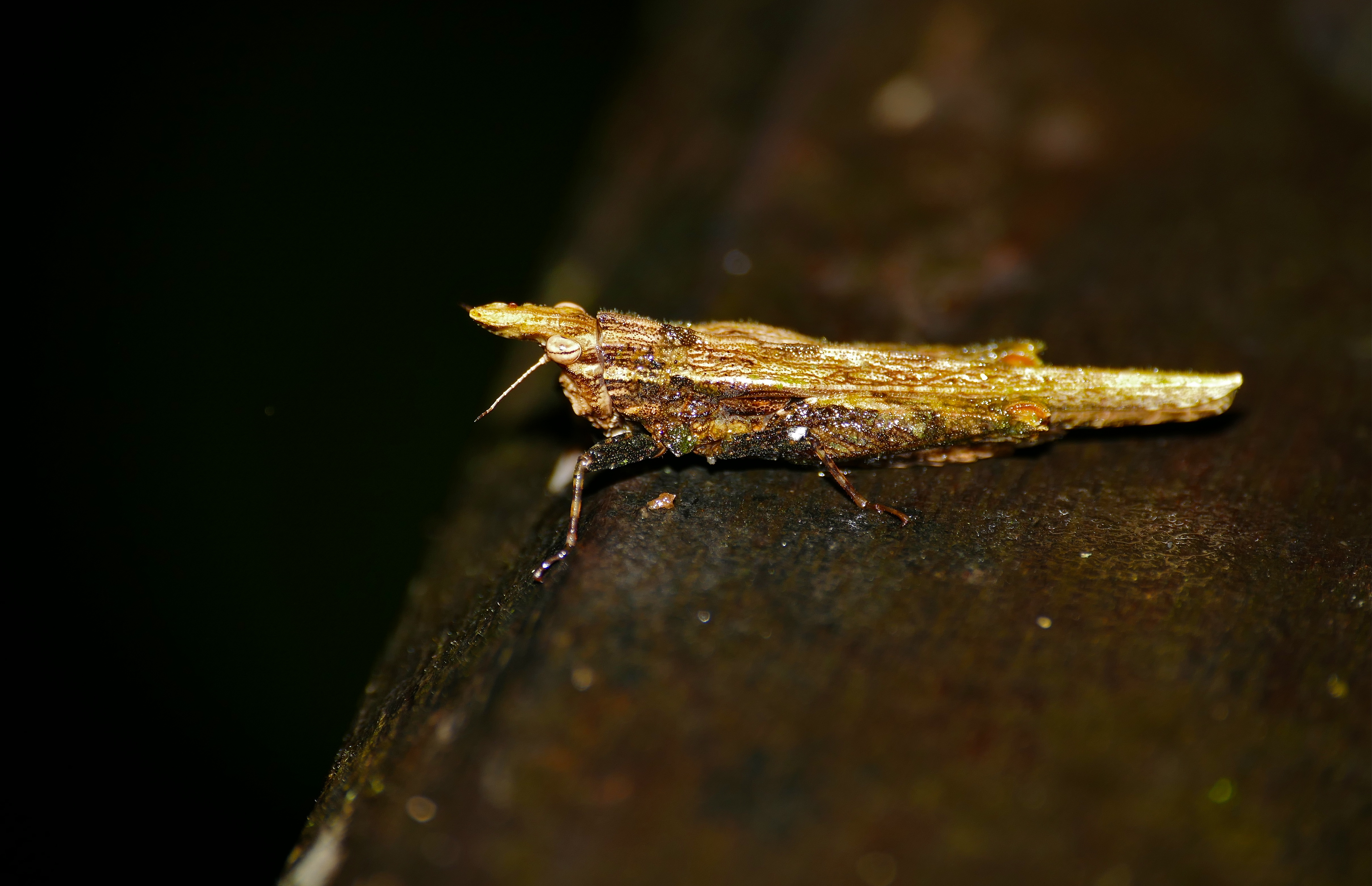
Rostella phyllocera (Borneo)

- Cleostratus Stål, 1877

Tribe Clinophaestini Storozhenko, 2013

- Birmana Brunner von Wattenwyl, 1893
- Clinophaestus Storozhenko, 2013

Tribe Miriatrini Cadena-Castañeda & Cardona, 2015 (monotypic)

- Miriatra Bolívar, 1906

Tribe Metrodorini Bolívar, 1887

- Cota Bolívar, 1887
- Metrodora Bolívar, 1887

Tribe Ophiotettigini Tumbrinck & Skejo, 2017

- Ophiotettix Walker, 1871

Tribe Unassigned

- Cleostratoides Storozhenko, 2013
- Macromotettix Günther, 1939
- Mazarredia Bolívar, 1887
- Pseudoxistrella Liang, 1991
- Vaotettix Podgornaya, 1986

=== Subfamily Scelimeninae ===
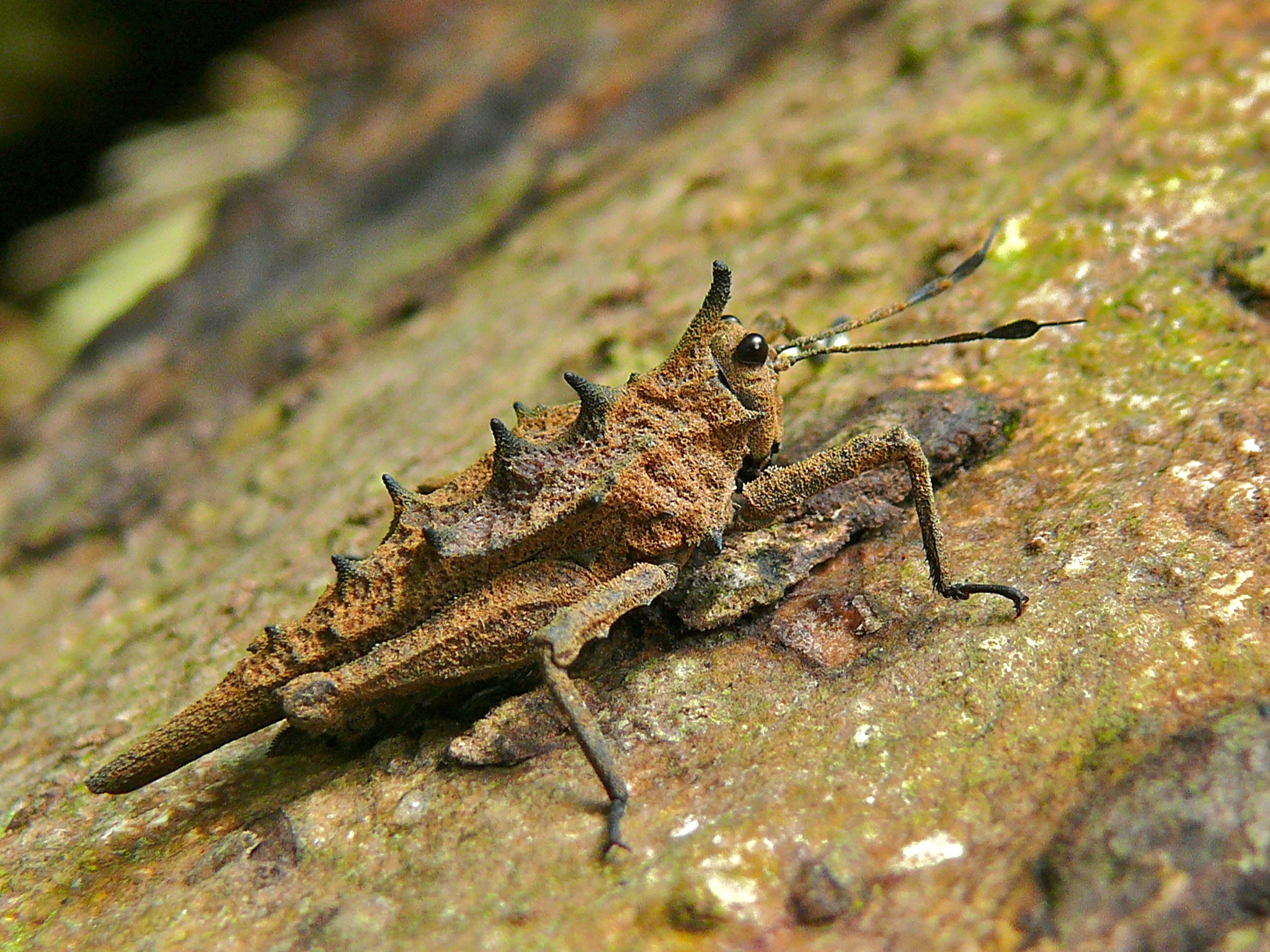
Discotettix belzebuth (Scelimeninae)

Auth.: Hancock, 1907 Tribe Scelimenini Hancock, 1907; selected genera:

- Amphibotettix Hancock, 1906
- Austrohancockia Günther, 1938
- Bidentatettix Zheng, 1992
- Discotettix Costa, 1864
- Gavialidium Saussure, 1862
- Scelimena Serville, 1838

incertae sedis

- Zhengitettix Liang, 1994

=== Subfamily Tetriginae ===
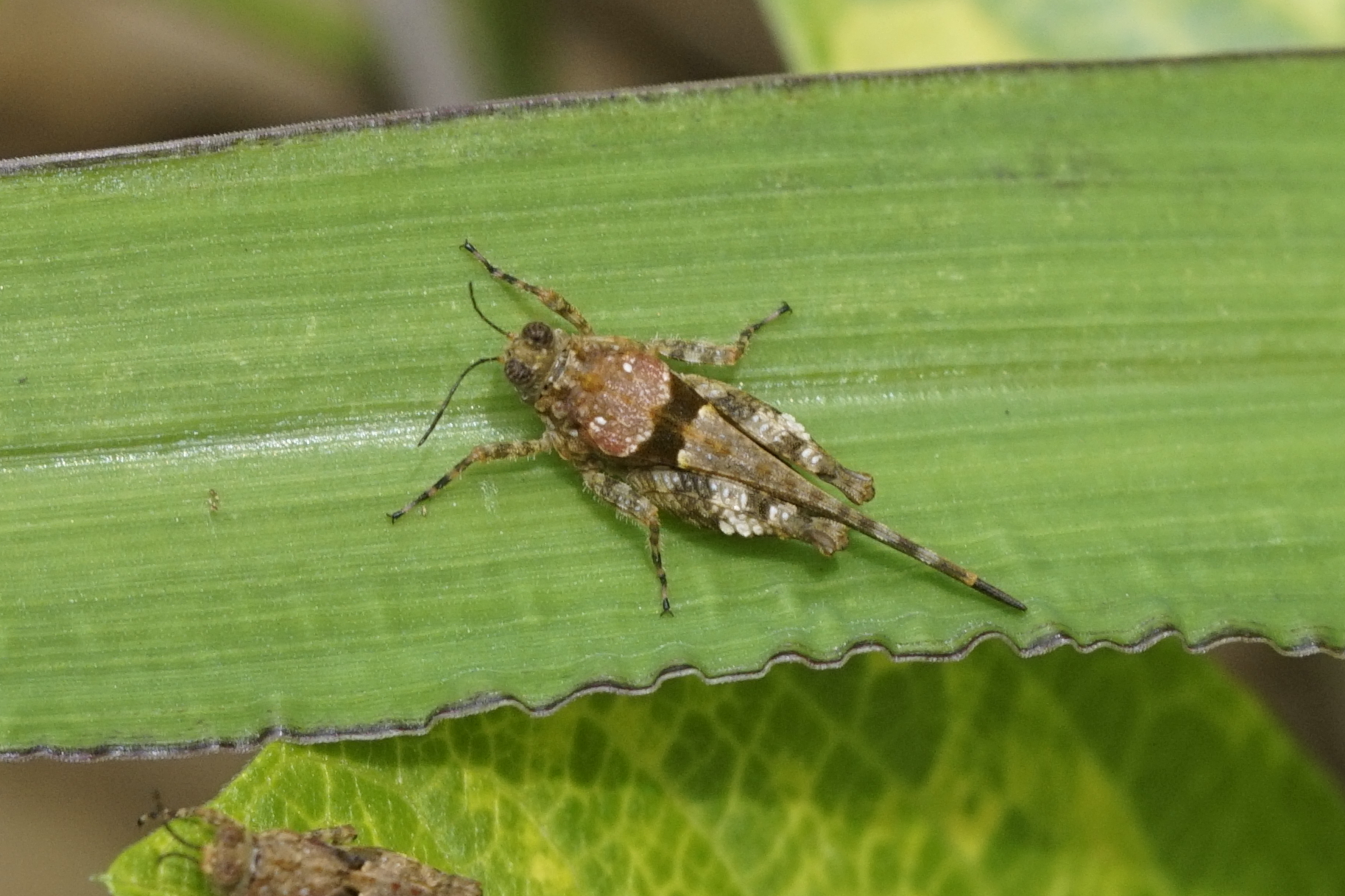
Paratettix sp.

Auth.: Serville, 1838; selected genera

Tribe Dinotettigini Günther, 1979

- Dinotettix Bolívar, 1905
- Ibeotettix Rehn, 1930

Tribe Tetrigini Serville, 1838

- Euparatettix Hancock, 1904
- Paratettix Bolívar, 1887
- Tetrix Latreille, 1802 (synonym Depressotetrix Karaman, 1960)
- Thibron Rehn, 1939

Tribe unassigned

- Aalatettix Zheng & Mao, 2002
- Bienkotetrix Karaman, 1965
- Coptotettix Bolívar, 1887
- Ergatettix Kirby, 1914
- Hedotettix Bolívar, 1887
- Neotettix Hancock, 1898
- Nomotettix Morse, 1894
- Oxyphyllum Hancock, 1909
- Phaesticus Uvarov, 1940
- Sciotettix Ichikawa, 2001

=== Subfamily Tripetalocerinae ===
Auth.: Bolívar, 1887

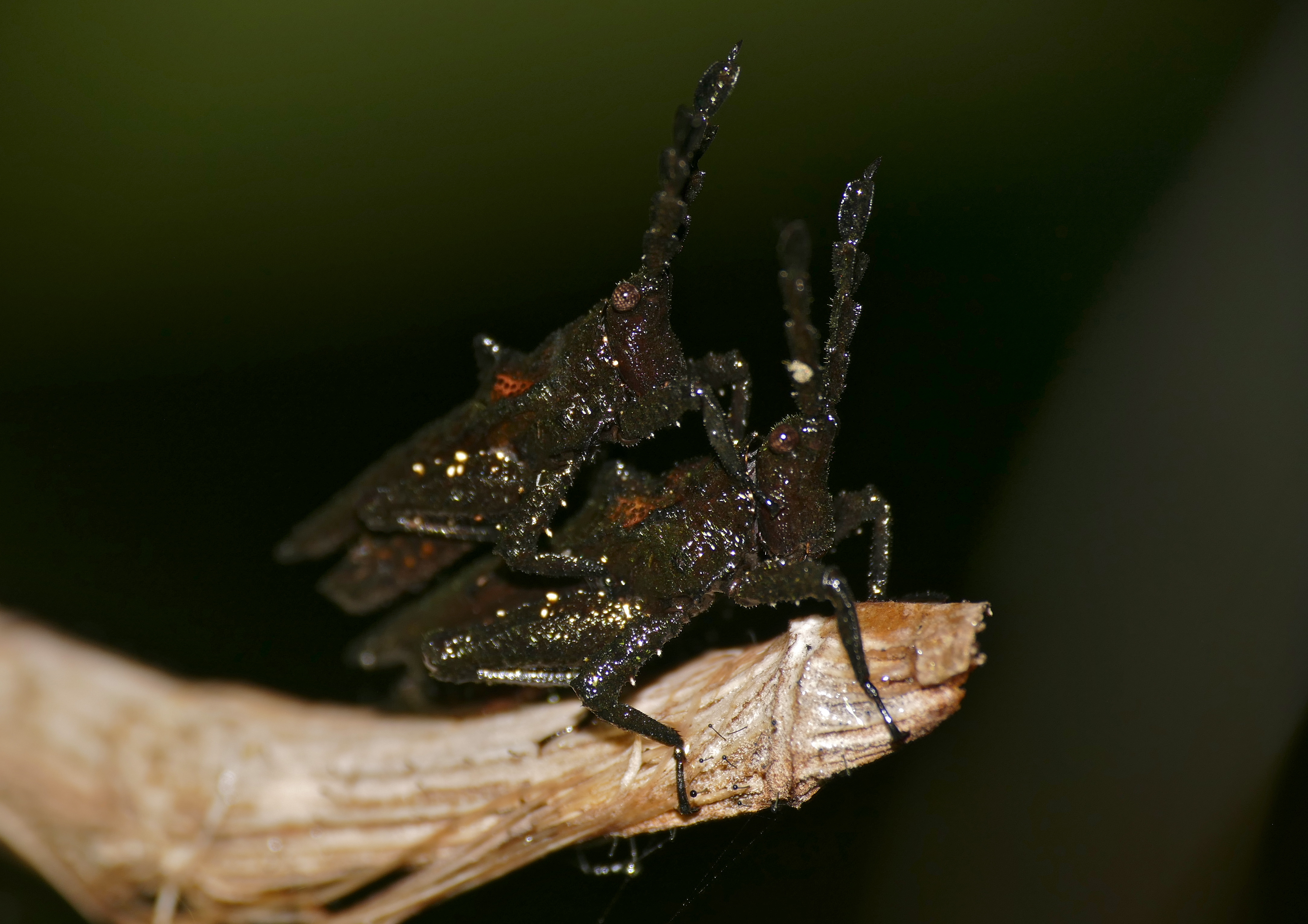
Tripetalocera ferruginea

Tripetalocerinae was originally described by Bolívar in 1887 to gather all the Tetrigidae genera of the old world with widened antennae (e.g. Arulenus, Discotettix, Hirrius, Ophiotettix, Tripetalocera). This subfamily today includes only two species in two genera - Tripetalocera (with one species) from India and Borneo and Tripetaloceroides (with one species) from Vietnam and PR China. Members of the subfamily are characteristic within Tetrigidae by massive antennae built up of only eight segments (other Tetrigidae have usually 11-16, Batrachideinae 18-22). Until recently, the subfamily included two tribes - Tripetalocerini and Clinophaestini (including Clinophaestus and Birmana), but the later was moved to the subfamily Metrodorinae due to similarity to Ophiotettigini.

- Tripetalocera - monotypic Tripetalocera ferruginea Westwood, 1834
- Tripetaloceroides Storozhenko, 2013 - monotypic Tripetaloceroides tonkinensis (Günther, 1938)

=== Subfamily unassigned ===
tribe Echopraxiini Kasalo & Skejo, 2024

1. Echopraxia (insect) Kasalo & Skejo, 2024
2. Eurymorphopus Hancock, 1907
3. Peraxelpa Sjöstedt, 1932
4. Planotettix Tumbrinck, 2014
5. Poseidontettix Kasalo & Skejo, 2025

Exanimini Kasalo, Tumbrinck & Skejo, 2024

1. Exanimus Kasalo, Tumbrinck & Skejo, 2024
2. Fijixistra Kasalo, Tumbrinck & Skejo, 2024
3. Ginixistra Kasalo, Tumbrinck & Skejo, 2025

Fijitettigini Kasalo, Tumbrinck & Skejo, 2024

1. Fijitettix Kasalo, Tumbrinck & Skejo, 2024
2. Salomonotettix Günther, 1939

Nophthini Kasalo & Skejo, 2025

1. Dystopia (insect) Kasalo & Skejo, 2025
2. Nophtha Kasalo & Skejo, 2025

Quasimodini Kasalo & Skejo, 2024

1. Quasimodo (insect) Kasalo & Skejo, 2024
2. Seraph (insect) Kasalo & Skejo, 2024
3. Willemsetettix Tumbrinck, 2014

==== Xistrellini ====
Auth: Skejo, Storozhenko, Tumbrinck & Kasalo, 2025; distribution: India, China, Indochina, western Malesia.

1. Afrosystolederus Devriese & Husemann, 2023
2. Bannatettix Zheng, 1993
3. Kanakacris Kasalo & Skejo, 2025
4. Phaesticus Uvarov, 1940 (synonym Flatocerus Liang & Zheng, 1984)
5. Pseudoparatettix Günther, 1937
6. Pseudosystolederus Günther, 1939
7. Pseudoxistrella Liang, 1991
8. Synalibas Günther, 1939
9. Systolederus Bolívar, 1887
10. Teredorus Hancock, 1907
11. Xistrella Bolívar, 1909

No tribe assigned

1. Almacris Skejo, Patano, Škorput & Kasalo, 2025
2. †Archaeotetrix Sharov, 1968
3. †Eozaentetrix Zessin, 2017
4. Euloxilobus Sjöstedt, 1936
5. Parahirrius Skejo, Patano & Kasalo, 2024
6. †Prototetrix Sharov, 1968
7. Spertor Kasalo & Skejo, 2025
8. Xistra Bolívar, 1887
