= List of Tetrix species =

These roughly 140 species belong to Tetrix, a genus of ground hoppers or pygmy grasshoppers in the family Tetrigidae.

== Tetrix species ==
- Tetrix aelytra Deng, Zheng & Wei, 2009^{c g}
- Tetrix akagiensis Uchida & Ichikawa, 1999^{c g}
- Tetrix arcunota Ingrisch, 2001^{(pending)} (or as malformed "arcunotus") ^{c g}
- Tetrix arenosa Burmeister, 1838^{i c g b} (obscure pygmy grasshopper)
- Tetrix areolata Westwood, 1841^{c g}
- Tetrix barbifemura Zheng, 1998^{c g}
- Tetrix barbipes Zheng, 2004^{c g}
- Tetrix beibuwanensis Zheng & Jiang, 1994^{c g}
- Tetrix beihaiensis Deng & Zheng, 2007^{c g}
- Tetrix bipunctata (Linnaeus, 1758)^{c g} (or as malformed "bipunctatus") ^{i}
- Tetrix bolivari Saulcy, 1901^{c g}
- Tetrix brachynota Zheng & Deng, 2004^{c g}
- Tetrix brevicornis Zheng Lin & Shi, 2012^{c g}
- Tetrix brevipennis Zheng & Ou, 2010^{c g}
- Tetrix brunnerii (Bolívar, 1887)^{b c g} (or as malformed "brunneri") ^{i} (Brunner's pygmy grasshopper)
- Tetrix cangshanensis Deng, Wang & Mao, 2021^{c g}
- Tetrix cavifrontalis Liang, 1998^{c g}
- Tetrix ceperoi (Bolívar, 1887)^{c g} (Cepero's groundhopper)
- Tetrix ceperoides Zheng & Jiang, 1997^{c g}
- Tetrix changbaishanensis Ren, Wang & Sun, 2003^{c g}
- Tetrix changchunensis Wang, Wang & Ren, 2005^{c g}
- Tetrix chichibuensis Uchida & Ichikawa, 1999^{c g}
- Tetrix chongqingensis Zheng & Shi, 2002^{c g}
- Tetrix collina Rehn, 1952^{c g}
- Tetrix condylops Gerstaecker, 1869^{c g}
- Tetrix coronata Fischer von Waldheim, 1833^{(pending)}
- Tetrix curvimarginus Zheng & Deng, 2004^{c g}
- Tetrix dentifemura Zheng, Shi & Luo, 2003^{c g}
- Tetrix depressa Brisout de Barneville, 1848^{c g}
- Tetrix dimidiata Westwood, 1841^{c g}
- Tetrix dongningensis Wang, 2007^{c g}
- Tetrix dorrigensis Rehn, 1952^{c g}
- Tetrix ensifera Westwood, 1841^{(pending)} (or as malformed "enisfer") ^{c g}
- Tetrix erhaiensis Zheng & Mao, 1997^{c g}
- Tetrix ewenkensis Zheng, Shi & Mao, 2010^{c g}
- Tetrix eyouqiensis Liang, 1996^{c (g pending from "equoqiensis")}
- Tetrix fengmanensis Ren, Meng & Sun, 2003^{c g}
- Tetrix fuchuanensis Zheng, 1998^{c g}
- Tetrix fuliginosa (Zetterstedt, 1828)^{c g}
- Tetrix fuliginosaoides Deng, 2016^{c g}
- Tetrix gavoyi Saulcy, 1901^{c g}
- Tetrix gibberosa (Wang & Zheng, 1993)^{c g}
- Tetrix gifuensis Storozhenko, Ichikawa & Uchida, 1994^{c g}
- Tetrix grossifemura Zheng & Jiang, 1997^{c g}
- Tetrix guangxiensis Zheng & Jiang, 1996^{c g}
- Tetrix guibeiensis Zheng, Lu & Li, 2000^{c g}
- Tetrix guibeioides Deng, Zheng & Wei, 2007^{c g}
- Tetrix guilinica Li & Huang, 2000^{c g}
- Tetrix guinanensis Zheng & Jiang, 2002^{c g}
- Tetrix huanjiangensis Zheng, Shi & Mao, 2010^{c g}
- Tetrix hururana Ingrisch, 2001^{(pending)} (or as malformed "arcunotus") ^{c g}
- Tetrix interrupta Zheng, 2004^{c g}
- Tetrix irrupta (Bolívar, 1887)^{c g}
- Tetrix japonica (Bolívar, 1887)^{c g}
- Tetrix jigongshanensis Zhao, Niu & Zheng, 2010^{c g}
- Tetrix jilinensis Ren, Wang & Meng, 2004^{c g}
- Tetrix jinshajiangensis Zheng & Shi, 2001^{c g}
- Tetrix kantoensis Uchida & Ichikawa, 1999^{c g}
- Tetrix kraussi Saulcy, 1888^{c g}
- Tetrix kunmingensis Zheng & Ou, 1993^{c g}
- Tetrix kunmingoides Zheng, 2005^{c g}
- Tetrix laticeps Westwood, 1841^{c g}
- Tetrix latifemuroides Zheng & Xie, 2004^{c g}
- Tetrix latifemurus Zheng & Xie, 2004^{c g}
- Tetrix lativertex Zheng, Li & Wei, 2002^{c g}
- Tetrix longipennis Zheng, 2006^{c g} (homonym of Tetrix longipennis Hancock, 1909 = Paratettix argillaceus (Erichson, 1842))
- Tetrix longipennioides Zheng & Ou, 2010^{c g}
- Tetrix longzhouensis Zheng & Jiang, 2000^{c g}
- Tetrix macilenta Ichikawa, 1993^{c g}
- Tetrix maguanensis Deng, Zheng & Wei, 2007^{c g}
- Tetrix mandanensis Zheng & Ou, 2010^{c g}
- Tetrix minor Ichikawa, 1993^{c g}
- Tetrix montivaga Rehn, 1952^{c g}
- Tetrix morbillosa (Fabricius, 1787)^{c g}(or as malformed "morbillosus") ^{wikis}
- Tetrix munda (Walker, 1871)^{c g}
- Tetrix nanpanjiangensis Deng, Zheng & Wei, 2008^{c g}
- Tetrix nanshanensis (Liang & Jiang, 2014)^{c g}
- Tetrix neozhengi Huang, 2014^{c g}
- Tetrix nigricollis Walker, 1871^{c g}(or as malformed "nigricolle") ^{wikis}
- Tetrix nigrimaculata Zheng & Shi, 2002^{c} (or as malformed and misspelt "nigromaculatus") ^{g, wikis}
- Tetrix nigrimarginis Zheng & Ou, 2004^{c g}
- Tetrix nigristriata Zheng & Nie, 2005^{(pending)} (or as malformed "nigristriatus") ^{c g}
- Tetrix nigrotibialis Chen, Zheng & Zeng, 2010^{c g}
- Tetrix nikkoensis Uchida & Ichikawa, 1999^{c g}
- Tetrix nodulosa (Fieber, 1853)^{c g}
- Tetrix nonmaculata Zheng & Ou, 2004^{c g}
- Tetrix ochronotata Zheng, 1998^{c g}
- Tetrix ornata (Say, 1824)^{i c g b} (ornate pygmy grasshopper)
- Tetrix parabarbifemura Zheng & Ou, 2004^{c g}
- Tetrix parabipunctata Zheng & Ou, 2004^{c g}
- Tetrix parabrachynota Zheng, Wang & Shi, 2007^{c g}
- Tetrix phrynus Rehn, 1952^{c g}
- Tetrix priscus (Bolívar, 1887)^{c g}
- Tetrix pseudodepressa (Ingrisch, 2006)^{(pending)} (or as malformed "pseudodepressus") ^{c g}
- Tetrix pseudosimulans Zheng & Shi, 2010^{c g}
- Tetrix puerensis Zheng, 2007^{c g}
- Tetrix qilianshanensis Zheng & Chen, 2000^{c g}
- Tetrix reducta (Walker, 1871)^{c g}
- Tetrix sadoensis Storozhenko, Ichikawa & Uchida, 1994^{c g}
- Tetrix serrifemoralis Zheng, 1998^{c g} (or as malformed ("serrifemora")^{wikis}
- Tetrix serrifemoroides Zheng & Jiang, 2002^{c g}
- Tetrix shaanxiensis Zheng, 2005^{c g}
- Tetrix shennongjiaensis Zheng, Li & Wei, 2002^{c g}
- Tetrix sierrana Rehn & Grant, 1956^{i c g b} (sierra pygmy grasshopper)
- Tetrix silvicultrix Ichikawa, 1993^{c g}
- Tetrix simingshanensis Chen, Zhang, Li & Yin, 2022^{c g}
- Tetrix simulanoides Zheng & Jiang, 1996^{c g}
- Tetrix simulans (Bey-Bienko, 1929)^{c g}
- Tetrix sinufemoralis Liang, 1998^{c g}
- Tetrix sipingensis Hao, Wang & Ren, 2006^{c g}
- Tetrix subulata (Linnaeus, 1761)^{i c g b} (slender groundhopper or awl-shaped pygmy grasshopper)
- Tetrix tartara (Saussure, 1887)^{c g}
- Tetrix tenuicornis (Sahlberg, 1891)^{c g}
- Tetrix tenuicornoides Wang, Yuan & Ren, 2006^{c g}
- Tetrix tereeshumerus Zheng & Wang, 2005^{c g}
- Tetrix tianensis Zheng, 2005^{c g}
- Tetrix tinkhami Zheng & Liang, 1998^{c g}
- Tetrix torulosinota Zheng, 1998^{c g}
- Tetrix torulosinotoides Zheng & Jiang, 2004^{c g}
- Tetrix totulihumerus Zheng & Nie, 2005^{c g}
- Tetrix transimacula Zheng, 1998^{c g}
- Tetrix transsylvanica (Bazyluk & Kis, 1960)^{c g}
- Tetrix tubercarina Zheng & Jiang, 1994^{c g}
- Tetrix tuerki (Krauss, 1876)^{c g}
- Tetrix undatifemura Zheng, Huo & Zhang, 2000^{c g}
- Tetrix undulata (Sowerby, 1806)^{c g} (common groundhopper)
- Tetrix wadai Uchida & Ichikawa, 1999^{c g}
- Tetrix weishanensis Zheng & Mao, 2002^{c g}
- Tetrix xiangzhouensis Deng, Zheng & Wei, 2008^{c g}
- Tetrix xiaowutaishanensis Zheng & Shi, 2010^{c g}
- Tetrix xinganensis Zheng & Zhou, 1997^{c g}
- Tetrix yangshuoensis Li & Huang, 2000^{c g}
- Tetrix yaoshanensis Liang, 1998^{c g}
- Tetrix yizhouensis Zheng & Deng, 2004^{c g}
- Tetrix yunnanensis Zheng, 1992^{c g}
- Tetrix zayuensis Zheng & Shi, 2009^{c g}
- Tetrix zhengi Jiang, 1994^{c g}
- Tetrix zhengioides Zheng, 2004^{c g}
- Tetrix zhongshanensis Deng, Zheng & Wei, 2007^{c g}

Data sources: i = ITIS, c = Catalogue of Life, g = GBIF, b = Bugguide.net

--- Others (as of 2024), since transferred or synonymised:

- Tetrix albistriatus Yao, Yanping & Zheng, 2006^{c g}
- Tetrix albomaculatus Zheng & Jiang, 2006^{c g}
- Tetrix albomarginis Zheng & Nie, 2005^{c g}
- Tetrix albomarginisoides Deng, 2016^{c g}
- Tetrix albonota Zheng, 2005^{c g}
- Tetrix americana Hancock, 1909^{i c g}
- Tetrix andeanum (Hebard, 1923)^{c g}
- Tetrix baditibialis Deng, 2016^{c g}
- Tetrix baoshanensis Zheng, Wei & Liu, 1999
- Tetrix cenwanglaoshana Zheng, Jiang & Liu, 2005^{c g}
- Tetrix cliva Zheng & Deng, 2004
- Tetrix crassivulva Denis, 1954
- Tetrix cuspidata Hancock, 1907^{c g}
- Tetrix cyaneum (Stoll, C.)^{c g}
- Tetrix dubiosus (Bolívar, 1887)^{c g}
- Tetrix duolunensis Zheng, 1996^{c g}
- Tetrix dushanensis Deng, 2016^{c g}
- Tetrix fuhaiensis Zheng, Zhang, Yang & Wang, 2006^{c g}
- Tetrix glochinota Zhao, Niu & Zheng, 2010^{c g}
- Tetrix gracilis Bruner, 1906^{c g}
- Tetrix granulata (Kirby, 1837)^{i}
- Tetrix grossovalva Zheng, 1994^{c g}
- Tetrix jingheensis Liang, Zheng, 1998^{c g}
- Tetrix jiuwanshanensis Zheng, 2005^{c g}
- Tetrix langshanensis Deng, W.-A., 2016^{c g}
- Tetrix latipalpa Cao & Zheng, 2011^{c g}
- Tetrix lativertexoides Deng, 2016^{c g}
- Tetrix liuwanshanensis Deng, Zheng & Wei, 2007^{c g}
- Tetrix lochengensis Zheng, 2005^{c g}
- Tetrix longipennis Zheng, 2006
- Tetrix mandanensis Zheng & Ou, 2010^{c g}
- Tetrix misera (Walker, 1871)^{c g}
- Tetrix nanus Bruner, 1910^{c g}
- Tetrix qinlingensis Zheng, Huo & Zhang, 2000^{c g}
- Tetrix rectimargina Zheng & Jiang, 2004^{c g}
- Tetrix rongshuiensis Deng, 2016^{c g}
- Tetrix ruyuanensis Liang, 1998^{c g}
- Tetrix sigillatum Bolívar, 1908^{c g}
- Tetrix signatus (Bolívar, 1887)^{c g}
- Tetrix slivae (Kostia, 1993)
- Tetrix subulatoides Zheng, Zhang, Yang & Wang, 2006^{c g}
- Tetrix torulosifemura Deng, 2016^{c g}
- Tetrix tuberculata (Zheng & Jiang, 1997)^{c g}
- Tetrix wagai Bazyluk, 1962^{c g}
- Tetrix xianensis Zheng, 1996^{c g}
- Tetrix xinchengensis Deng, Zheng & Wei, 2007^{c g}
- Tetrix xinjiangensis Zheng, 1996^{c g}
- Tetrix yunlongensis Zheng & Mao, 2002^{c g}
