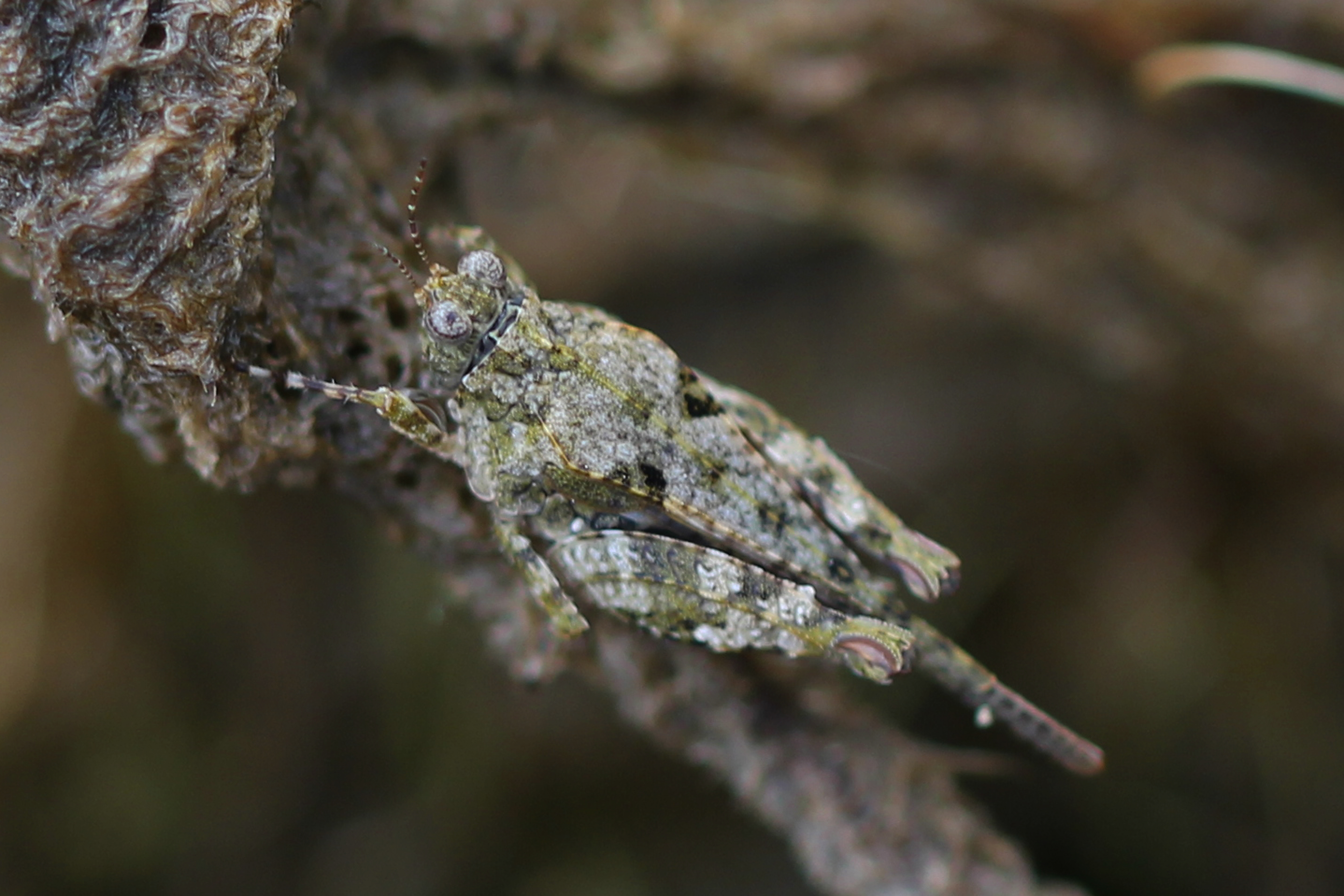

Scientific classification
- Domain: Eukaryota
- Kingdom: Animalia
- Phylum: Arthropoda
- Class: Insecta
- Order: Orthoptera
- Suborder: Caelifera
- Family: Tetrigidae
- Tribe: Tetrigini
- Genus: Paratettix
- Species: P. mexicanus

Binomial name
- Paratettix mexicanus (Saussure, 1861)

= Paratettix mexicanus =

Species of grasshopper

Paratettix mexicanus, the Mexican pygmy grasshopper, is a species of pygmy grasshopper in the family Tetrigidae. It is found in Central America and North America.

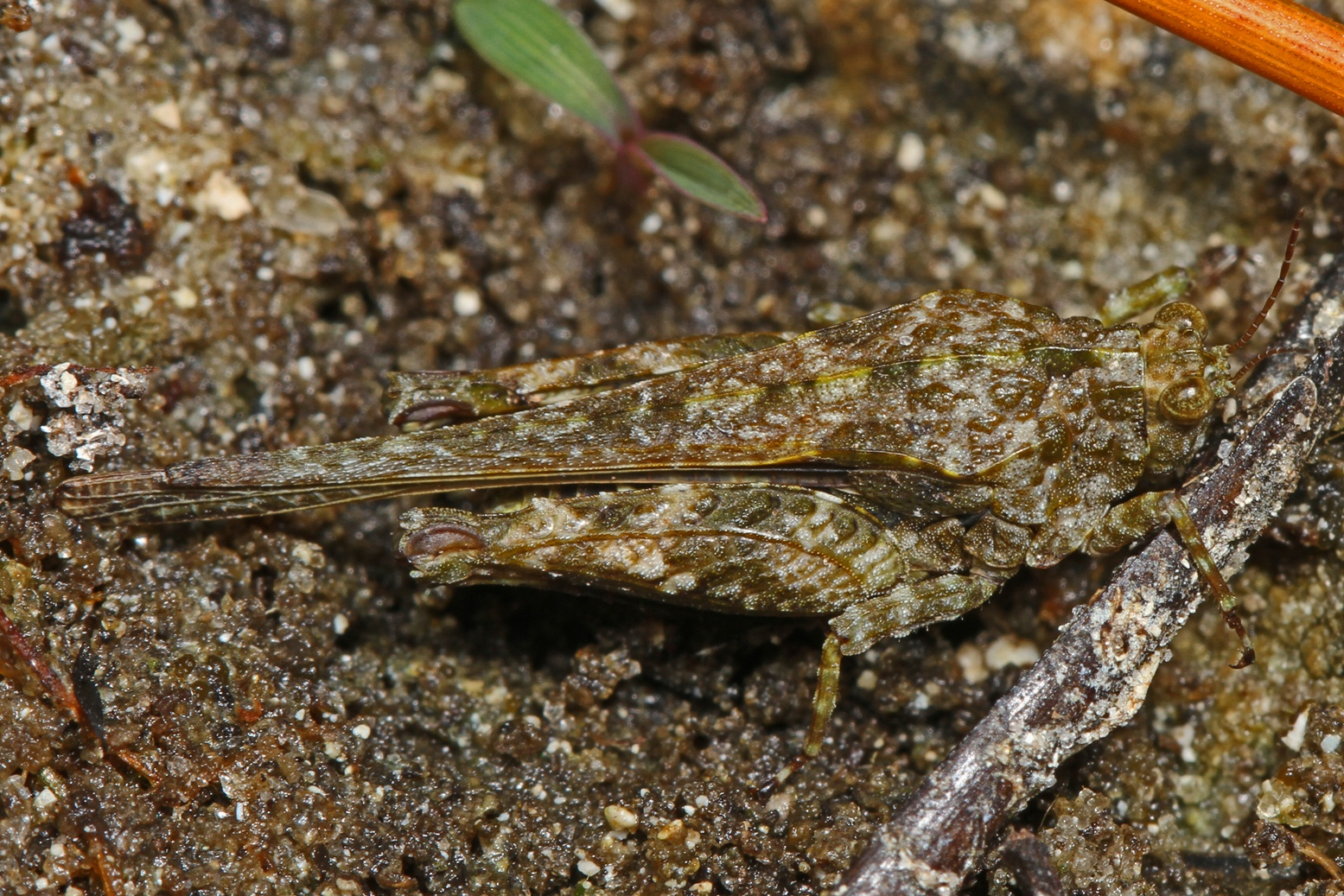
Mexican pygmy grasshopper, Paratettix mexicanus
