= Euparatettix =

Scientific classification
- Kingdom: Animalia
- Phylum: Arthropoda
- Clade: Pancrustacea
- Class: Insecta
- Order: Orthoptera
- Suborder: Caelifera
- Family: Tetrigidae
- Tribe: Tetrigini
- Genus: Euparatettix; Hancock, 1904

Genus of grasshoppers

External image
- Images at iNaturalist

Euparatettix is an Asian genus of ground-hoppers (Orthoptera: Caelifera) in the subfamily Tetriginae and tribe Tetrigini.

== Species ==
The Catalogue of Life lists:

- Euparatettix albomaculatus Zheng & Xu, 2010
- Euparatettix albonemus Zheng & Deng, 2004
- Euparatettix albostriatus Zheng & Deng, 2004
- Euparatettix annulicornis Deng & Zheng, 2006
- Euparatettix apterus Zheng & Ou, 2009
- Euparatettix avellanitibis Zheng & Jiang, 2006
- Euparatettix balteatus Walker, 1871
- Euparatettix barbifemura Zheng & Ou, 2003
- Euparatettix barbifemuraoides Deng, Zheng & Qin, 2008
- Euparatettix bengalensis Hancock, 1912
- Euparatettix bimaculatus Zheng, 1993
- Euparatettix birmanicus Hancock, 1915
- Euparatettix brachynotus Zheng & Jiang, 1996
- Euparatettix brachyptera Zheng & Mao, 2002
- Euparatettix candidistris Zheng & Jiang, 2006
- Euparatettix circinihumerus Wei & Zheng, 2006
- Euparatettix cultratus Bolívar, 1898
- Euparatettix erythronotus Zheng & Jiang, 2000
- Euparatettix euguangxiensis Zheng & Wei, 2005
- Euparatettix fangchengensis Zheng, 2005
- Euparatettix galbustriatus Zheng & Li, 2012
- Euparatettix globivertex Zheng, Shi & Mao, 2010
- Euparatettix gongshanensis Zheng, 1992
- Euparatettix guangxiensis Zheng, 1994
- Euparatettix guinanensis Wei & Zheng, 2006
- Euparatettix histricus Stål, 1861
- Euparatettix indicus Bolívar, 1887
- Euparatettix insularis Bey-Bienko, 1951
- Euparatettix jingdongensis Zheng & Ou, 2003
- Euparatettix jinghongensis Zheng, Zeng & Ou, 2011
- Euparatettix leuconotus Zheng, Lu & Li, 2000
- Euparatettix lijiangensis Zheng & Ou, 2010
- Euparatettix liubaensis Zheng, 2005
- Euparatettix lochengensis Zheng, 2005
- Euparatettix longipennis Zheng & Jiang, 2000
- Euparatettix macrocephalus Günther, 1941
- Euparatettix melanotus Zheng & Jiang, 1997
- Euparatettix menglianensis Zheng & Xu, 2010
- Euparatettix menglunensis Zheng, 2006
- Euparatettix menlunensis Zheng, 2006
- Euparatettix mimus Bolívar, 1887
- Euparatettix nigrifasciatus Zheng & Ou, 2010
- Euparatettix nigrifemurus Deng, Zheng & Wei, 2007
- Euparatettix nigritibis Zheng & Jiang, 2000
- Euparatettix obliquecosta Zheng & Jiang, 2006
- Euparatettix ochronemus Zheng, Shi & Mao, 2010
- Euparatettix parvus Hancock, 1904
- Euparatettix personatus (Bolívar, 1887) - type species (as Paratettix personatus Bolívar)
- Euparatettix planipedonoides Zheng & Jiang, 2003
- Euparatettix planipedonus Zheng, 1998
- Euparatettix prominemarginis Zheng, 2005
- Euparatettix pseudomelanotus Zheng & Jiang, 2004
- Euparatettix rapidus Steinmann, 1964
- Euparatettix rongshuiensis Zheng, 2005
- Euparatettix scabripes Bolívar, 1898
- Euparatettix semihirsutus Brunner von Wattenwyl, 1893
- Euparatettix serrifemoralis Zheng & Xie, 2007
- Euparatettix sikkimensis Hancock, 1915
- Euparatettix similis Hancock, 1907
- Euparatettix sinufemoralis Zheng & Jiang, 2002
- Euparatettix spicuvertex Zheng, 1998
- Euparatettix spicuvertexoides Zheng, 2005
- Euparatettix strimaculatus Zheng, Lu & Li, 2000
- Euparatettix torulosinotus Zheng, 1998
- Euparatettix tricarinatus Bolívar, 1887
- Euparatettix tridentatus Zheng, 2005
- Euparatettix variabilis Bolívar, 1887
- Euparatettix waterstoni Uvarov, 1952
- Euparatettix xinchengensis Zheng, Shi & Luo, 2003
- Euparatettix xizangensis Zheng, 2005
- Euparatettix yunnanensis Zheng & Xie, 2000
- Euparatettix zayuensis Zheng, Zeng & Ou, 2011
