= Paratettix brevipennis =

Scientific classification
- Kingdom: Animalia
- Phylum: Arthropoda
- Clade: Pancrustacea
- Class: Insecta
- Order: Orthoptera
- Suborder: Caelifera
- Family: Tetrigidae
- Tribe: Tetrigini
- Genus: Paratettix
- Species: P. brevipennis

Binomial name
- Paratettix brevipennis (Hancock, 1902)

Species of grasshopper

Paratettix brevipennis, the short-winged pygmy grasshopper, is a species of pygmy grasshopper in the family Tetrigidae. It is found in North America.
