= Paratettix rugosus =

Scientific classification
- Domain: Eukaryota
- Kingdom: Animalia
- Phylum: Arthropoda
- Class: Insecta
- Order: Orthoptera
- Suborder: Caelifera
- Family: Tetrigidae
- Tribe: Tetrigini
- Genus: Paratettix
- Species: P. rugosus

Binomial name
- Paratettix rugosus (Scudder, 1863)

Species of grasshopper

Paratettix rugosus, known generally as the rough-back pygmy grasshopper or rough-backed grouse locust, is a species of pygmy grasshopper in the family Tetrigidae. It is found in North America.
