= Aalatettix longipulvillus =

Scientific classification
- Kingdom: Animalia
- Phylum: Arthropoda
- Class: Insecta
- Order: Orthoptera
- Suborder: Caelifera
- Family: Tetrigidae
- Subfamily: Tetriginae
- Genus: Aalatettix
- Species: A. longipulvillus

Binomial name
- Aalatettix longipulvillus Zheng & Mao, 2002

Species of grasshopper

Aalatettix longipulvillus is a species of pygmy grasshopper in the family Tetrigidae. It is known from Yunnan Province, China.

It was described by Zheng & Mao in 2002 and is the type species of the genus Aalatettix. The holotype male is deposited at the Museum of Flora and Fauna of Shaanxi Normal University.
