= Paratettix curtipennis =

Scientific classification
- Kingdom: Animalia
- Phylum: Arthropoda
- Clade: Pancrustacea
- Class: Insecta
- Order: Orthoptera
- Suborder: Caelifera
- Family: Tetrigidae
- Genus: Paratettix
- Species: P. curtipennis

Binomial name
- Paratettix curtipennis (Hancock, 1912)

Synonyms
- Paratettix crasseipes Karny, 1915; Coptotettix curtipennis Hancock, 1912

Species of grasshopper

Paratettix curtipennis is a species of groundhopper which belongs to the subfamily Tetriginae and tribe Tetrigini. Its distribution includes: India (type locality), southern China, including Tawan, Indo-China and peninsular Malaysia; no subspecies are listed in the Catalogue of Life or the Orthoptera Species File.
