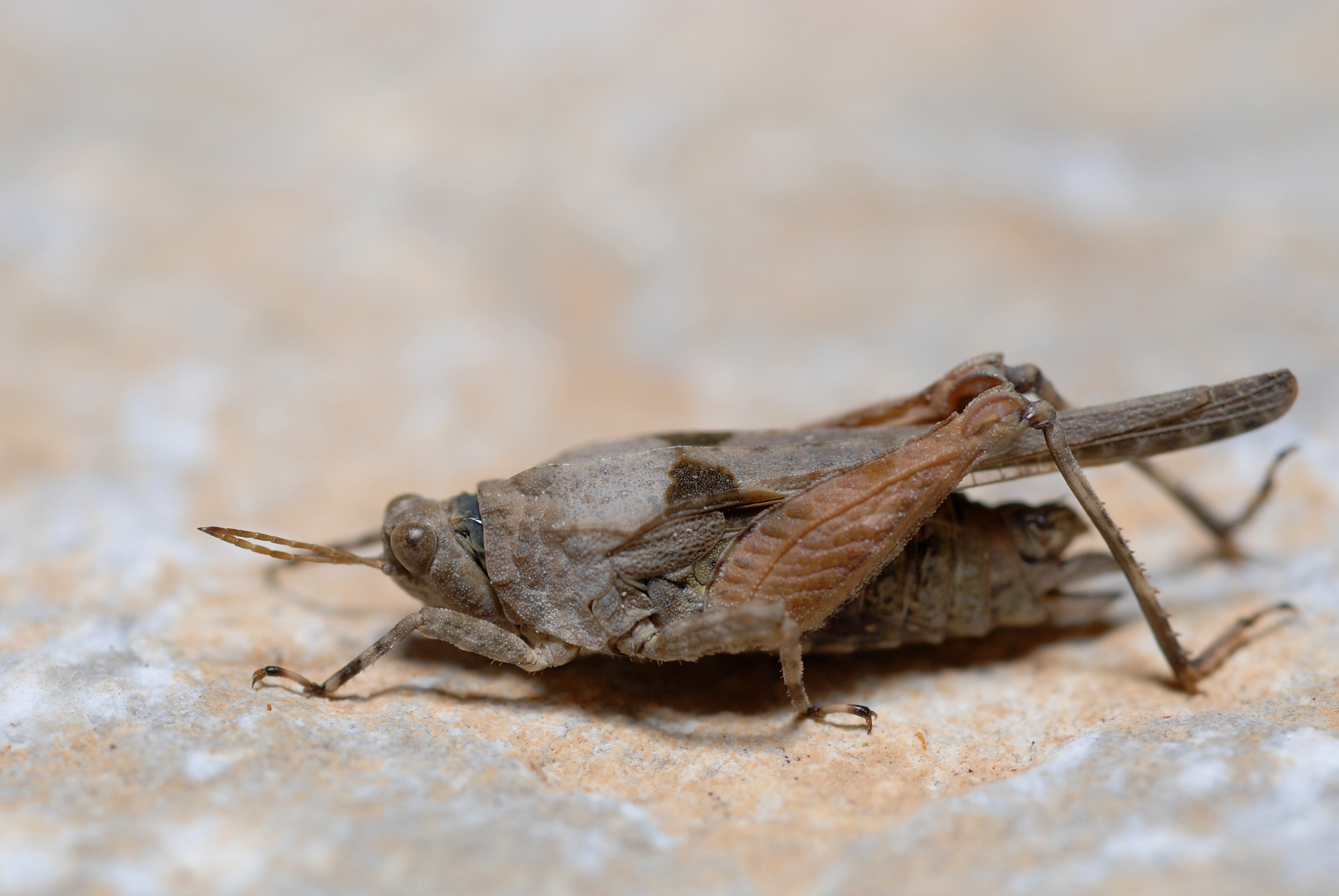

Scientific classification
- Domain: Eukaryota
- Kingdom: Animalia
- Phylum: Arthropoda
- Class: Insecta
- Order: Orthoptera
- Suborder: Caelifera
- Family: Tetrigidae
- Genus: Paratettix
- Species: P. meridionalis

Binomial name
- Paratettix meridionalis (Rambur, 1838)

Synonyms
- Tetrix brachyptera Lucas, H., 1849: Paratettix dorhni (Fieber, 1853); Tettix ophthalmicus Fieber, 1853; Paratettix weidneri Karaman, M.S., 1965

= Paratettix meridionalis =

Species of grasshopper

Paratettix meridionalis is the type species of ground-hopper in its genus, which belongs to the subfamily Tetriginae and tribe Tetrigini. Its distribution includes: southern Europe, northern Africa, Arabian peninsula and records from Mexico and no subspecies are listed in the Catalogue of Life or the Orthoptera Species File.
