= Paratettix toltecus =

Scientific classification
- Domain: Eukaryota
- Kingdom: Animalia
- Phylum: Arthropoda
- Class: Insecta
- Order: Orthoptera
- Suborder: Caelifera
- Family: Tetrigidae
- Tribe: Tetrigini
- Genus: Paratettix
- Species: P. toltecus

Binomial name
- Paratettix toltecus (Saussure, 1861)

Species of grasshopper

Paratettix toltecus, known generally as the toltec pygmy grasshopper or toltecan grouse locust, is a species of pygmy grasshopper in the family Tetrigidae. It is found in Central America, North America, and South America.
