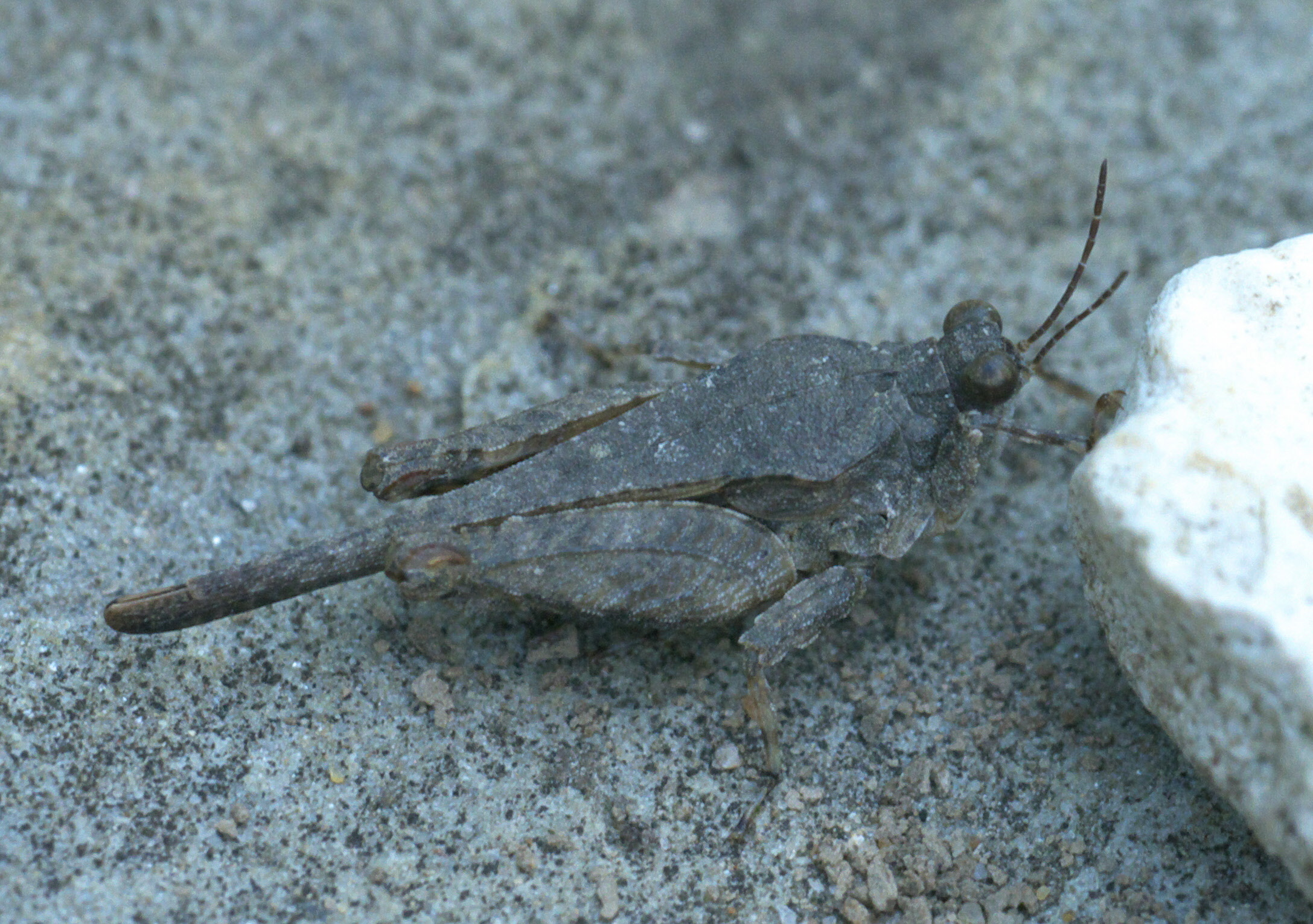

Scientific classification
- Kingdom: Animalia
- Phylum: Arthropoda
- Class: Insecta
- Order: Orthoptera
- Suborder: Caelifera
- Family: Tetrigidae
- Tribe: Tetrigini
- Genus: Paratettix
- Species: P. cucullatus

Binomial name
- Paratettix cucullatus (Burmeister, 1838)

= Paratettix cucullatus =

Species of grasshopper

Paratettix cucullatus, the hooded grouse locust, is a species of pygmy grasshopper in the family Tetrigidae. It is found in North America.
