= Neotettix femoratus =

Scientific classification
- Domain: Eukaryota
- Kingdom: Animalia
- Phylum: Arthropoda
- Class: Insecta
- Order: Orthoptera
- Suborder: Caelifera
- Family: Tetrigidae
- Genus: Neotettix
- Species: N. femoratus

Binomial name
- Neotettix femoratus (Scudder, 1869)

Synonyms
- Neotettix bolteri Hancock, 1898

Species of grasshopper

Neotettix femoratus, known generally as the short-leg pygmy grasshopper or short-legged grouse locust, is a species of pygmy grasshopper in the family Tetrigidae. It is found in North America and Australia.
