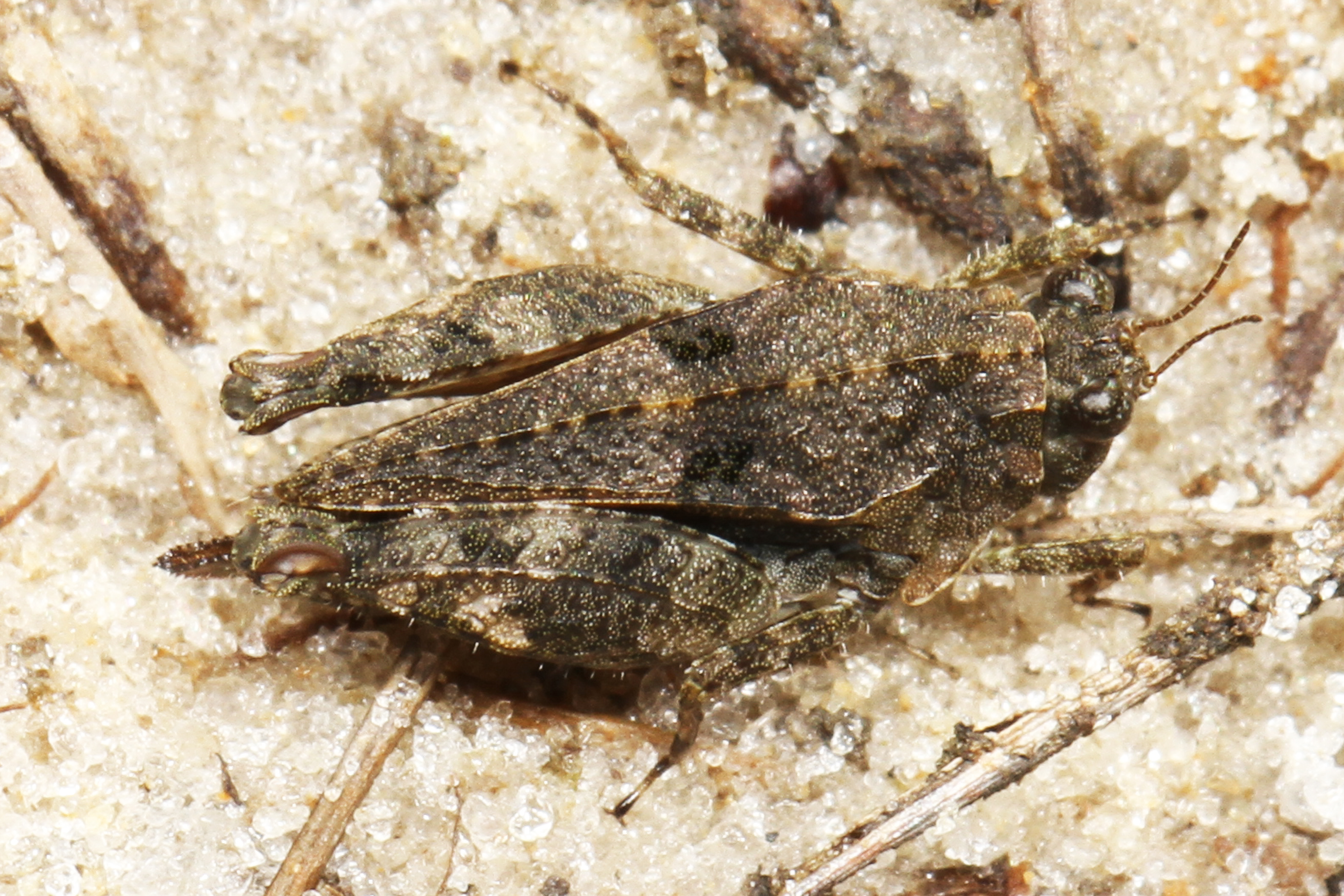

Scientific classification
- Kingdom: Animalia
- Phylum: Arthropoda
- Clade: Pancrustacea
- Class: Insecta
- Order: Orthoptera
- Suborder: Caelifera
- Family: Tetrigidae
- Subfamily: Tetriginae
- Genus: Neotettix; Hancock, 1898

= Neotettix =

Genus of grasshoppers

Neotettix is a genus of pygmy grasshoppers in the family Tetrigidae. There are four described species in Neotettix: all from North America.

== Species ==
These four species belong to the genus Neotettix:

- Neotettix femoratus (Scudder, 1869)^{i c g b} (short-leg pygmy grasshopper)
- Neotettix nullisinus (Hancock, 1919)^{i c g b} (sinusless pygmy grasshopper)
- Neotettix proavus Rehn & Hebard, 1916^{i c g b} (fork-face pygmy grasshopper)
- Neotettix proteus Rehn and Hebard, 1916^{i c g}

Data sources: i = ITIS, c = Catalogue of Life, g = GBIF, b = Bugguide.net
