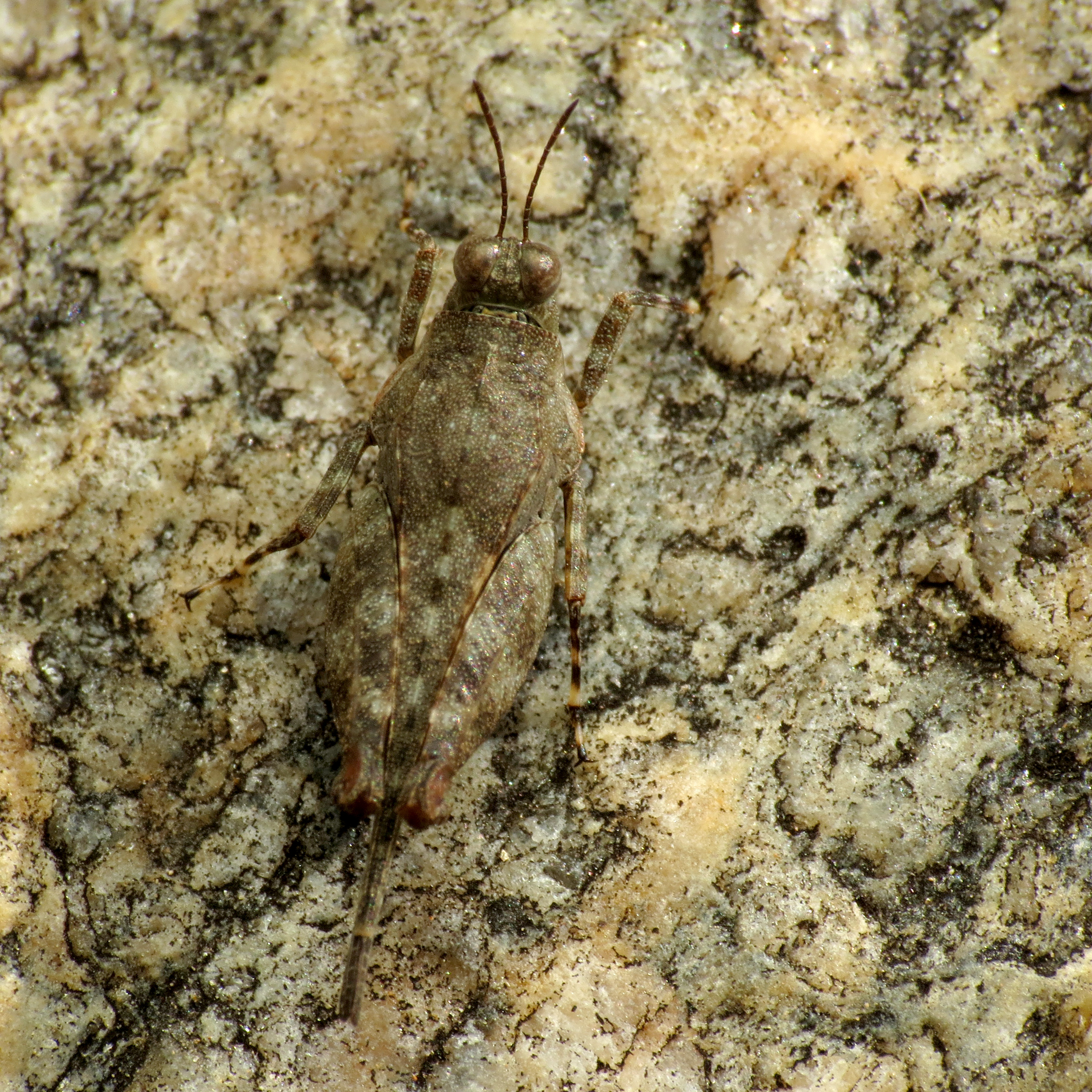
- Paratettix aztecus

Scientific classification
- Domain: Eukaryota
- Kingdom: Animalia
- Phylum: Arthropoda
- Class: Insecta
- Order: Orthoptera
- Suborder: Caelifera
- Family: Tetrigidae
- Subfamily: Tetriginae
- Tribe: Tetrigini
- Genus: Paratettix; I. Bolivar, 1887

Synonyms
- Apotettix Hancock, 1902

= Paratettix =

Genus of grasshoppers

Paratettix is a genus of ground-hoppers or pygmy grasshoppers, with more than 60 described species found worldwide.

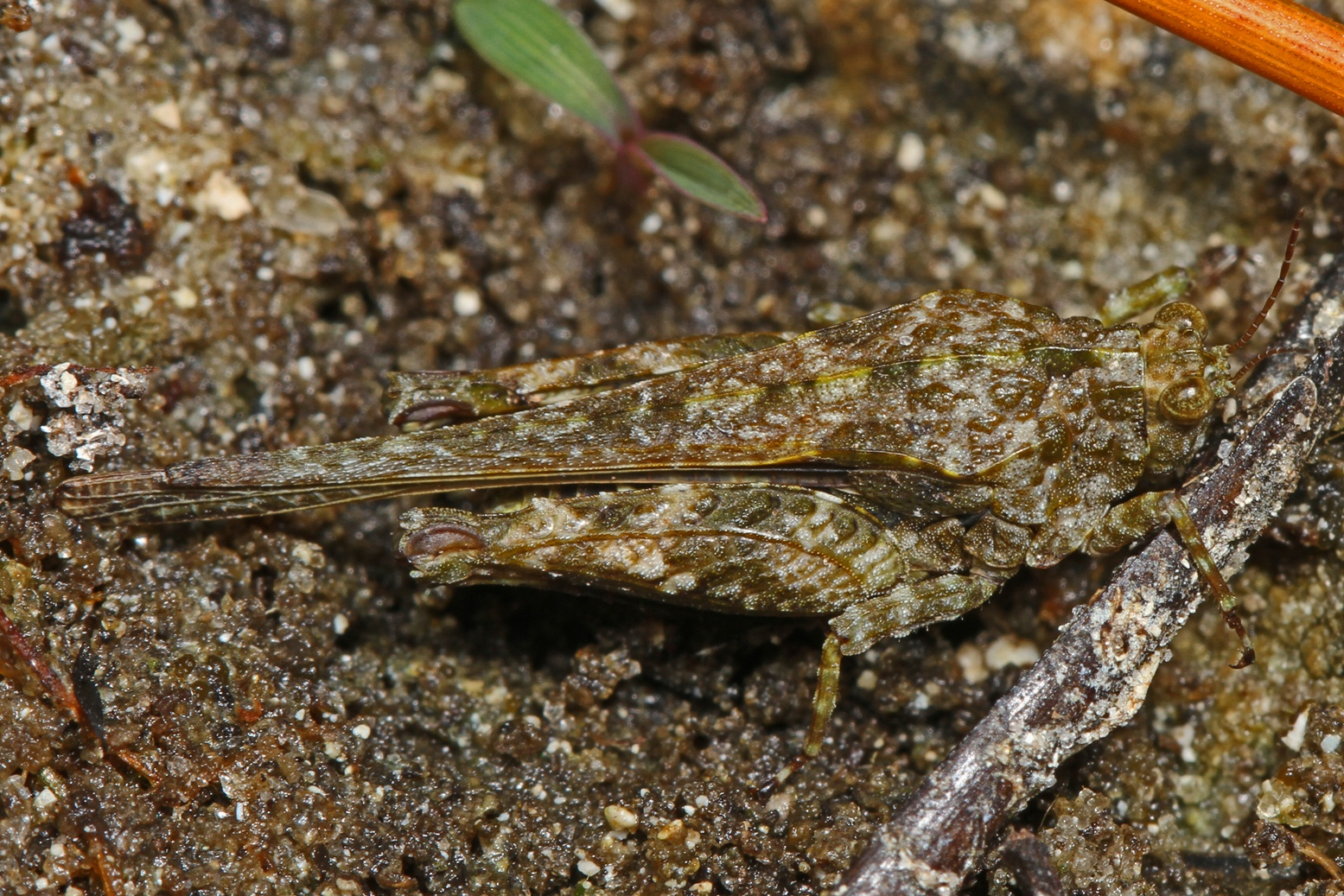
Paratettix mexicanus

== Species ==
These species have been assigned to the genus Paratettix:

- Paratettix africanus Bolívar, I., 1908^{c g}
- Paratettix alatus Hancock, J.L., 1915^{c g}
- Paratettix albescens (Walker, F., 1871)^{c g}
- Paratettix amplus Sjöstedt, 1921^{c g}
- Paratettix antennatus Hebard, 1923^{c g}
- Paratettix argillaceus (Erichson, 1842)^{c g} (synonyms: P. femoralis)
- Paratettix asbenensis Chopard, 1950^{c g}
- Paratettix attenuata (Walker, F., 1871)^{c g}
- Paratettix australis (Walker, F., 1871)^{c g}
- Paratettix austronanus Otte, D., 1997^{c g}
- Paratettix aztecus (Saussure, 1861)^{i c g b} (Aztec pygmy grasshopper)
  - synonym: Paratettix rugosus (Scudder, 1863)^{i c g b} (rough-back pygmy grasshopper)
- Paratettix brevipennis (Hancock, 1902)^{i c g b} (short-winged pygmy grasshopper)
- Paratettix bruneri (Hancock, J.L., 1906)^{c g}
- Paratettix chagosensis Bolívar, I., 1912^{c g}
- Paratettix chopardi Günther, K., 1979^{c g}
- Paratettix cingalensis (Walker, F., 1871)^{c g}
- Paratettix crassus Sjöstedt, 1936^{c g}
- Paratettix cucullatus (Burmeister, 1838)^{i c g b} (hooded grouse locust)
- Paratettix curtipennis (Hancock, J.L., 1912)^{c g}
- Paratettix feejeeanus Bruner, L., 1916^{c g}
- Paratettix freygessneri Saussure, 1887^{i}
- Paratettix freygessnerii Bolívar, I., 1887^{c g}
- Paratettix gentilis Günther, K., 1936^{c g}
- Paratettix gibbosulus Günther, K., 1979^{c g}
- Paratettix gilloni Günther, K., 1979^{c g}
- Paratettix gracilis (Bruner, L., 1906)^{c g}
- Paratettix hachijoensis Shiraki, 1906^{c g}
- Paratettix hastata (Walker, F., 1871)^{c g}
- Paratettix heteropus Bolívar, I., 1896^{c g}
- Paratettix histricus (Stål, 1861)^{c g}
- Paratettix ignobilis (Walker, F., 1871)^{c g}
- Paratettix infelix Günther, K., 1938^{c g}
- Paratettix iranica Uvarov, 1952^{c g}
- Paratettix iranicus Uvarov & Dirsh, 1952^{c}
- Paratettix lamellitettigodes Günther, K., 1979^{c g}
- Paratettix latipennis Hancock, J.L., 1915^{c g}
- Paratettix lippensi Günther, K., 1979^{c g}
- Paratettix macrostenus Günther, K., 1979^{c g}
- Paratettix marshalli Hancock, J.L., 1909^{c g}
- Paratettix meridionalis (Rambur, 1838)^{c g} - type species (as Tetrix meridionalis Rambur)
- Paratettix mexicanus (Saussure, 1861)^{i c g b} (Mexican pygmy grasshopper)
- Paratettix nigrescens Sjöstedt, 1921^{c g}
- Paratettix obesus Bolívar, I., 1887^{c g}
- Paratettix obliteratus Bey-Bienko, 1951^{c g}
- Paratettix obtusopulvillus Günther, K., 1979^{c g}
- Paratettix overlaeti Günther, K., 1979^{c g}
- Paratettix pallipes (Walker, F., 1871)^{c g}
- Paratettix pictus Hancock, J.L., 1910^{c g}
- Paratettix proximus (Hancock, J.L., 1907)^{c g}
- Paratettix pullus Bolívar, I., 1887^{c g}
- Paratettix rotundatus Hancock, J.L., 1915^{c g}
- Paratettix ruwenzoricus Rehn, J.A.G., 1914^{c g}
- Paratettix scaber (Thunberg, 1815)^{c g}
- Paratettix scapularis (Palisot De Beauvois, 1805)^{c g}
- Paratettix schochi Bolívar, I., 1887^{b} (broad-legged pygmy grasshopper)
- Paratettix shelfordi Hancock, J.L., 1909^{c g}
- Paratettix singularis Shiraki, 1906^{c g}
- Paratettix sinuatus Morse, 1900^{c g}
- Paratettix spathulatus (Stål, 1861)^{c g}
- Paratettix striata (Palisot De Beauvois, 1805)^{c g}
- Paratettix subiosum Bolívar, I., 1887^{c g}
- Paratettix subpustulata (Walker, F., 1871)^{c g}
- Paratettix toltecus (Saussure, 1861)^{i c g b} (toltec pygmy grasshopper)
- Paratettix tumidus Günther, K., 1938^{c g}
- Paratettix uvarovi Semenov, 1915^{c g}
- Paratettix variabilis Bolívar, I., 1887^{c g}
- Paratettix vexator Günther, K., 1938^{c g}
- Paratettix villiersi Günther, K., 1979^{c g}
- Paratettix voeltzkowiana Saussure, 1899^{c g}
- Paratettix zonata (Walker, F., 1871)^{c g}

Data sources: i = ITIS, c = Catalogue of Life, g = GBIF, b = Bugguide.net
