= Neotettix nullisinus =

Scientific classification
- Kingdom: Animalia
- Phylum: Arthropoda
- Clade: Pancrustacea
- Class: Insecta
- Order: Orthoptera
- Suborder: Caelifera
- Family: Tetrigidae
- Genus: Neotettix
- Species: N. nullisinus

Binomial name
- Neotettix nullisinus (Hancock, 1919)

Species of grasshopper

Neotettix nullisinus, the sinusless pygmy grasshopper, is a species of pygmy grasshopper in the family Tetrigidae. It is found in North America.
