= Neotettix proavus =

Scientific classification
- Domain: Eukaryota
- Kingdom: Animalia
- Phylum: Arthropoda
- Class: Insecta
- Order: Orthoptera
- Suborder: Caelifera
- Family: Tetrigidae
- Genus: Neotettix
- Species: N. proavus

Binomial name
- Neotettix proavus Rehn & Hebard, 1916

Species of grasshopper

Neotettix proavus, known generally as the fork-face pygmy grasshopper or fork-face grouse locust, is a species of pygmy grasshopper in the family Tetrigidae. It is found in North America.
