= Ergatettix =

Scientific classification
- Domain: Eukaryota
- Kingdom: Animalia
- Phylum: Arthropoda
- Class: Insecta
- Order: Orthoptera
- Suborder: Caelifera
- Family: Tetrigidae
- Subfamily: Tetriginae
- Genus: Ergatettix; Kirby, 1914

Genus of grasshoppers

Ergatettix is an Asian genus of ground-hoppers (Orthoptera: Caelifera) in the subfamily Tetriginae (no tribe assigned).

== Species ==
The Catalogue of Life lists:

- Ergatettix albostriatus Zheng & Li, 2001
- Ergatettix brachynota Zheng & Liang, 1993
- Ergatettix brachyptera Zheng, 1992
- Ergatettix callosus Hancock, 1915
- Ergatettix crassipes Hancock, 1912
- Ergatettix dorsifera Walker, 1871 - type species (as E. tarsalis (Kirby, 1914))
- Ergatettix elevatus Ingrisch, 2001
- Ergatettix guentheri Steinmann, 1970
- Ergatettix interruptus Brunner von Wattenwyl, 1893
- Ergatettix lativertex Zheng & Xu, 2010
- Ergatettix minutus Ingrisch, 2001
- Ergatettix nodulosus Bolívar, 1887
- Ergatettix novaeguineae Bolívar, 1898
- Ergatettix panchtharis Ingrisch, 2001
- Ergatettix paranodulosus Otte, 1997
- Ergatettix serrifemora Deng, Zheng & Wei, 2008
- Ergatettix serrifemoroides Zheng & Shi, 2009
- Ergatettix siasovi Moritz, 1928
- Ergatettix undunotus Ingrisch, 2001
