= Thibron =

Scientific classification
- Kingdom: Animalia
- Phylum: Arthropoda
- Clade: Pancrustacea
- Class: Insecta
- Order: Orthoptera
- Suborder: Caelifera
- Family: Tetrigidae
- Subfamily: Tetriginae
- Tribe: Tetrigini
- Genus: Thibron; Rehn, 1939

Genus of grasshoppers

Thibron is a genus of insect in the family Tetrigidae (the groundhoppers), tribe Tetrigini, from the central part of Africa.

== Species ==
The Orthoptera Species File lists:

- Thibron illepidus (Karsch, 1893)
- Thibron lunda (Rehn, 1930)
- Thibron mendax Rehn, 1939
- Thibron mombuttu Rehn, 1939 - synonym Pseudomitraria breviceps (Günther, 1939) - type species
- Thibron tectatus Günther, 1979
