= Aalatettix =

Scientific classification
- Domain: Eukaryota
- Kingdom: Animalia
- Phylum: Arthropoda
- Class: Insecta
- Order: Orthoptera
- Suborder: Caelifera
- Family: Tetrigidae
- Subfamily: Tetriginae
- Genus: Aalatettix; Zheng, Z. & B. Mao 2002

Genus of grasshoppers

Aalatettix is a genus of groundhopper, in the family Tetrigidae, with species found in southern China (including Hainan island).

The type species, identified in 2002, of this genus is known as Aalatettix longipulvillus. Later more species where identified as belonging to this genus.

== Newly discovered sp. ==
1. Aalatettix bulbosus Deng, 2016
2. Aalatettix cangshanensis Zheng, Z., L.-L. Lin & Hong-Li Zhang, 2013
3. Aalatettix gibbosa Zheng, Z., C. Cao & Shen-Zhi Chen, 2011
4. Aalatettix hupingshanensis Zheng, Z., 2014
5. Aalatettix lativertex Zheng, Z., 2014
6. Aalatettix leshanensis Zheng, Z., C. Cao & Shen-Zhi Chen, 2011
7. Aalatettix lini Cao, C., J. Shi & Z. Yin, 2016
8. Aalatettix longipulvillus Zheng, Z. & B. Mao, 2002 (type species)
9. Aalatettix nyalamensis Zheng, Z. & L.-L. Lin, 2015
10. Aalatettix xiai Zheng, A.-Q., J. Shi & Z. Yin, 2015
11. Aalatettix yangi Zheng, A.-Q., J. Shi & Z. Yin, 2015
