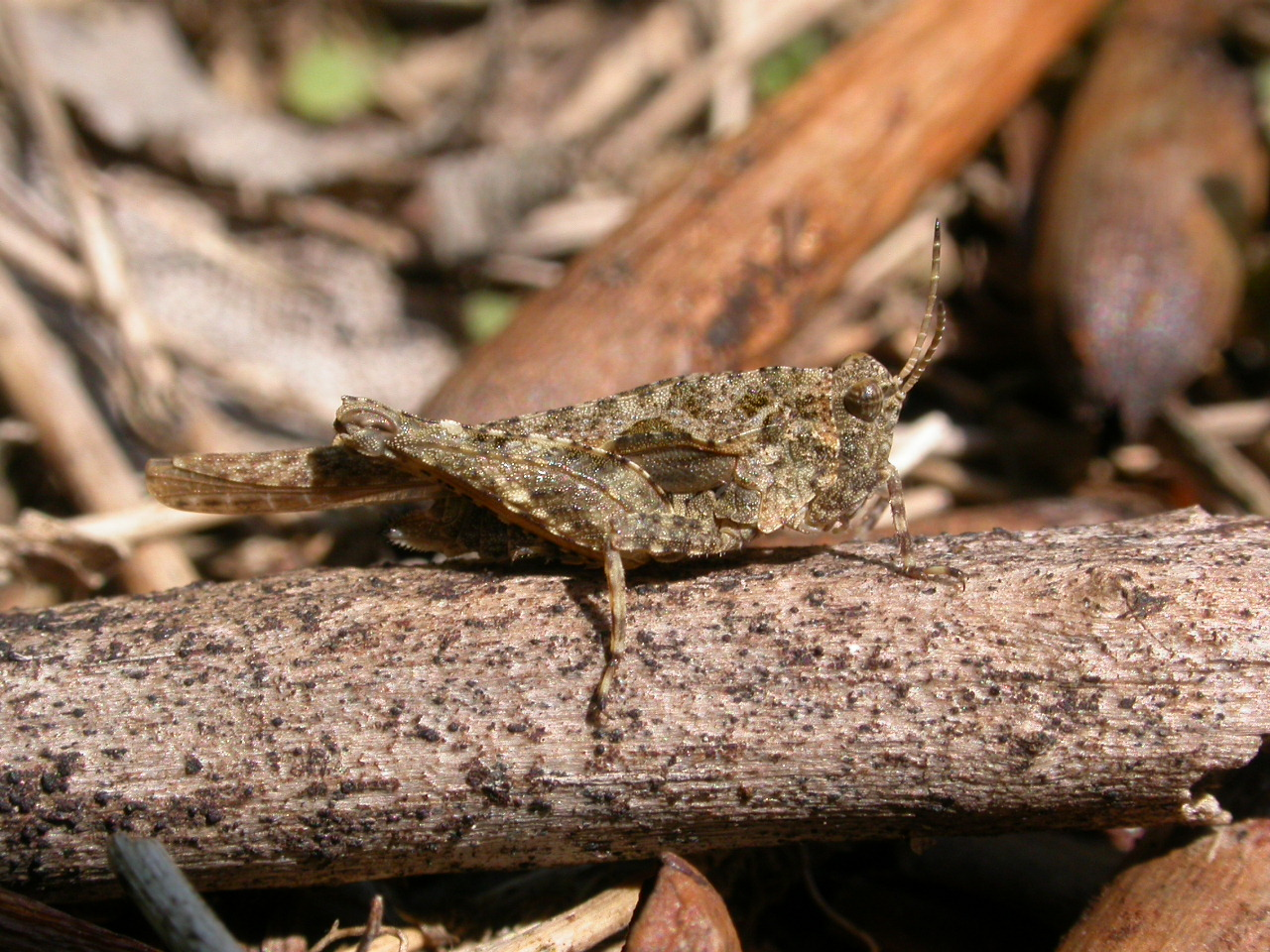

Scientific classification
- Kingdom: Animalia
- Phylum: Arthropoda
- Clade: Pancrustacea
- Class: Insecta
- Order: Orthoptera
- Suborder: Caelifera
- Family: Tetrigidae
- Genus: Tetrix
- Species: T. ceperoi

Binomial name
- Tetrix ceperoi (Bolívar, 1887)

= Tetrix ceperoi =

Species of grasshopper

Tetrix ceperoi, Cepero's groundhopper, is a member of the family Tetrigidae and is very similar to common grasshoppers. Unlike the common grasshopper, the wings of T. ceperoi extend beyond its pronotum (the upper surface of the first segment of the thorax). The front wings have evolved throughout history to be stumps, and the back wings are very well developed and capable of flying. T. ceperoi sports wide shoulders while covering its narrow abdomen beneath the pronotum. T. ceperoi reach an average length of about 10 millimetres (0.39 in). T. ceperoi is a multi-coloured ground dweller with the ability to blend into its surroundings. The ability of T. ceperoi to be different colours makes it able to evolve colour schemes better adapted to specific habitats which provides protection from predators. T. ceperoi is diurnal but can choose to hibernate during late nymphal instar stages and later on in life as adults.

== Habitat ==
T. ceperoi naturally resides in warm places, in damp and bare areas of land. However, due to threatened natural habitats, T. ceperoi also can also be found living in dunes along shore lines, and in low and open vegetations. As T. ceperoi has evolved, it has also become capable of surviving in "floodplains, moist dune slacks, sand pits, drainage ditches or ponds". Adult T. ceperoi are skilled swimmers and therefore are not hindered by the large amounts of water in close proximity in flooded areas.

=== Subspecies: distribution ===
The Orthoptera Species File lists:

1. T. ceperoi ceperoi: from the coasts of the West Mediterranean area, Central Europe, Germany, Southern England and South Wales.
2. T. ceperoi chinensis: records (probably incomplete) from eastern China and Thailand.

=== Conservation ===
T. ceperoi is becoming an endangered species in Central Europe due to "coastal protection and floodplain regulation". Therefore, It can only claim its true natural habitat in areas of the Wadden Sea Islands.

=== Habitat experiments ===
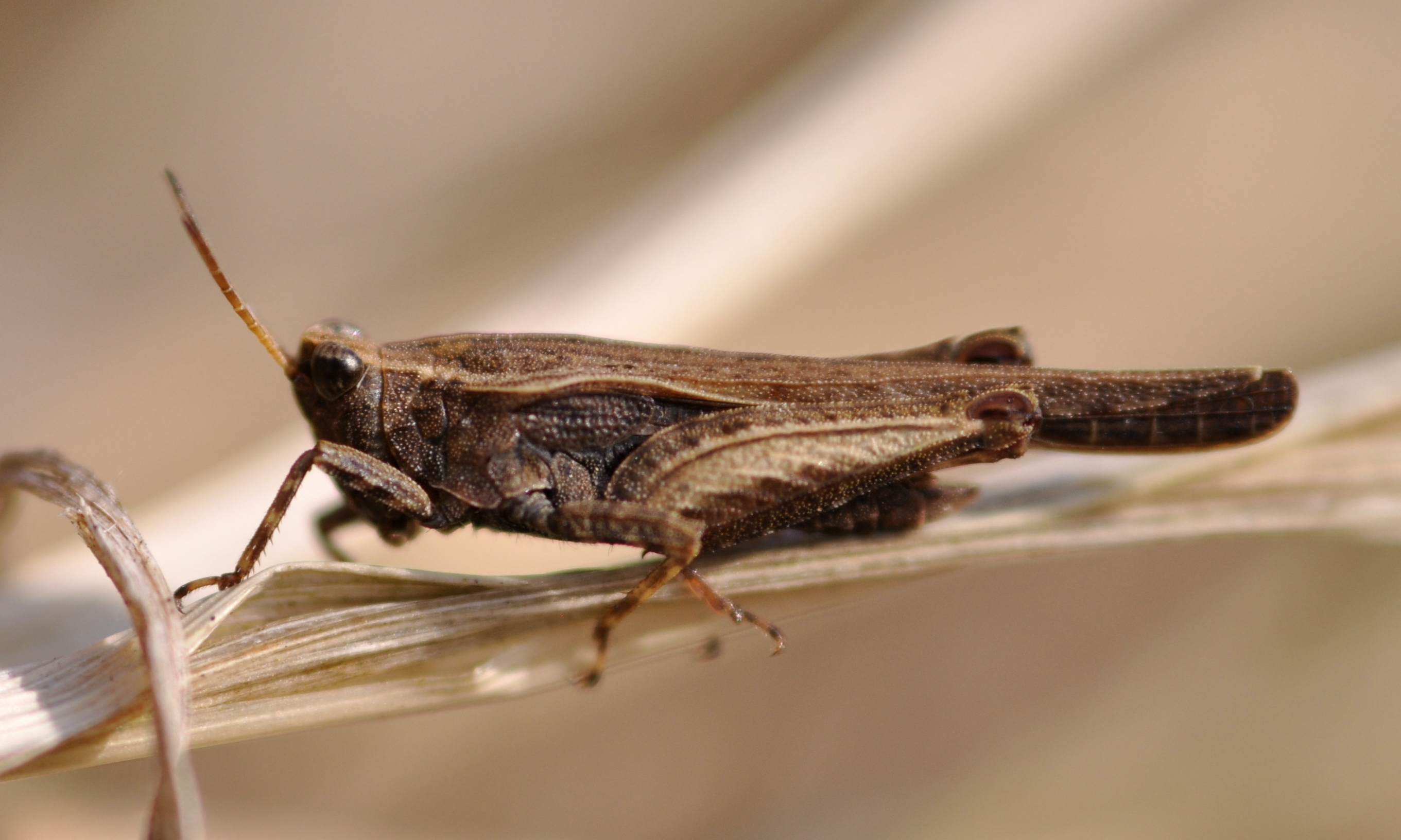
T. subulata interferes with reproduction in T. cepnoi.

The question of the little-known habitat of T. ceperoi has come into greater study recently. Hochkirch et al. observed the reproductive interference between T. ceperoi and T. subulata, a neighbor and closely related species. Often two species that are very similar and share similar habitats are able to coexist, but do so at the cost of one species eventually being displaced by the interaction and experience lower fitness. Before one is displaced, the two species can go through intense competition. Two different ways animals can experience competition could be resource competition and reproductive competition. Resource competition could consist of fighting for food or territorial locations strategically safe from harm whether that be from predators or weather. Reproductive competition is the result of similar species exhibiting similar mating and courting systems. T. ceperoi shares some common territory with T. subulata because of common habitat requirements, however they do not "co-occur locally". Experiments were conducted by based on the mechanisms of coexistence to better understand the interaction because previous "in lab" and "in the wild" experiments disagreed. This study had four primary ways of attacking the question of how reproductive interference was handled. First, they studied wild ground hoppers in order to understand the magnitude and sexual interaction of species in the wild. Second, they analyzed if the species used different micro habitats, which was important because it could lead to "segregation on a micro-scale". Third, they mapped where and in what amounts each species was present in relation to food sources in order to see if there was any type of segregation or aggregation. Lastly, they experimentally changed the different habitats in order to see if the spatial distribution was a reflection of the "micro-habitat preferences".

One theory of temporal segregation was able to be ruled out immediately based on the fact that both species are diurnal. If one had been nocturnal, while the other was diurnal, the temporal patterns of each species could be deemed the way reproductive interference was battled. Next, the species courting actions could be separated based on the movements of their body. T. ceperoi performed "pronotal bobbing", which is basically quick movement of the hind legs and the covering of the first thoracic segment. T. subulata on the other hand must simply swing their body both laterally and frontally, spending less energy than T. ceperoi, to mate. The study conducted in Emsland, Germany, was conducted between 10:30 and 17:00 on 116 individuals for thirty-minute increments. Results showed that males, who are inclined to court anything that is about their size and moves, more often attempted to court females. However, the females that were the receivers of the attention were not limited to the species of the male, indicating heterospecific interactions. Furthermore, from the female standpoint, T. ceperoi females fought off heterospecific interactions more than T. subulata, who performed defensive maneuvers equally towards heterospecific interactions as well as conspecific. Microhabitat preference analysis results yielded T. subulata enjoyed taller vegetation areas with more ground cover than T. ceperoi. This is important because Hochkirch et al. believe although resource and reproductive competition play a huge role in the interspecies interaction, the costs can be offset by different habitat factors such as segregative mechanisms, dilution effects, and life history effects. In accordance with Wertheim et al., the results showed coexistence can be explained by intraspecific aggregations despite the presence or absence of unequally distributed resources.

Lastly, the group was able to determine the reason for difference between testing done in the lab versus testing done in the wild could most likely be accredited with the increased number of forced heterospecific interactions due to small arenas in the lab testing. This conclusion further indicated that reproductive interference is density dependent, which was in accordance with previous studies.

== Sexual dimorphism ==
T. ceperoi males are able to distinguish between similar species, but not between sexes, due to a rather large sexual dimorphism. Sexual dimorphism is the different characteristics present in individuals of the same species, but opposite sexes. The sexual dimorphism between the two sexes is a result of a single additional instar in the female larval stages. This indicates the male emerges sooner than the female and therefore can link the larger size to the additional period of growth.

T. ceperoi is not unique in its apparent sexual dimorphism, as many Orthoptera present the similar traits of females averaging 9% larger than males. T. ceperoi is a member of the Caelifera suborder, in which sexual size dimorphism is about 37% strong and ranges from -20%-140% across the suborder. One important fact to take note of is the females in this suborder are larger than males, while males conserve a comparable height across species, which is different from the Ensifera sexual dimorphism where females are comparable and male size decreases. Sexual dimorphism causes resource competition as a result of "niche breadth and dispersion pattern".

=== Sexual size dimorphism experiments ===
==== Hochkirch et al. ====
The dimorphism in the order could either be a result of intersexual competition or differential equilibrium. Intersexual competition refers to the sexes feeding on different resources in order to reduce the competition within the species, while differential equilibrium refers to the different body sizes as a result of the opposing strategies of each sex to increase fitness. Females tend to lay more eggs and invest more time in those specific eggs directly opposing males who in order to increase their own fitness, spend less time on a specific group of eggs, and attempt to fertilise as many eggs as possible. The differential equilibrium hypothesis is well supported; however it cannot be deemed the clear answer because not enough experiments have tested intersexual competition. One problem with comparing these two different hypotheses comes from the chance that dimorphic niches may have evolved from something in the past that is no longer present today, also known as "ghost of competition past" by Connell. Information was collected from 3 main databases, which spanned 1503 species of Oriental and African Orthoptera, to determine females were larger in the majority of the 99.6% of the species. Another hypothesis was that perhaps the temperature controlled the growth of Orthoptera, which would be in accordance with previous data that Omocestus viridulus had the additional instar stage in only low altitude areas of the Alps. The study concludes with numerous theories, but decides there is not sufficient research to determine the exact cause of sexual size dimorphism in Orthoptera.

==== Krause et al. ====
The sexual dimorphism is believed to be a result of the different niches selected by each sex. The choice between habitats for each sex has been hypothesised by Krause et al. to be a result of the reproductive costs and activities. Krause et al. discovered males flock to brighter areas and are on bare ground (which is used during mating) more than females. Females on the other hand "rest and feed on the vegetation". These different places probably evolved due to the males who put themselves in danger of predation accruing greater chances at mating, while females enjoy nutrients to provide healthier offspring.

== Diet ==
The diet of T. ceperoi is composed of moss and various plants. The common mosses eaten by T. ceperoi include Bryum argenteum, B. caespiticum, Ceratodon purpureus and Barbula sp.. Less common diet choices include grasses, algae, and sometimes animal fragments and organic debris.

== Reproduction ==
Throughout May and June, Male insects of the Orthoptera order lure females to them using mating sounds, and then forcibly insert their sperm directly into the female's abdomen. However, another source notes that Tetrigidae do not have tympanums and are unable to stridulate, but still display courtship behaviours for the female. Since T. ceperoi is both Orthoptera and Tetrigidae, it seems there is some discontinuity and more research must be done to clear up the discrepancy. The sperm packet inserted into the female constitutes about 60% of the males' body weight. Sperm packages are important because they are a nuptial gift given to the female in exchange for mating. Nuptial gifts are packages put together by the male in order to be able to mate with the female. The female has the choice to accept the sperm package and mate, or deny it and wait for a more suitable candidate. The sperm package might seem like an entirely selfless and generous gift of the male in order to mate, but in reality, the nutrients in the sperm package provide nutrition for the female and therefore benefit the male's offspring which increases his fitness. Moreover, nuptial gifts fulfill the selfish nature of most animal behaviours.
