= Tetrix sierrane =

Conservation status
- Vulnerable (IUCN 2.3)

Scientific classification
- Kingdom: Animalia
- Phylum: Arthropoda
- Class: Insecta
- Order: Orthoptera
- Suborder: Caelifera
- Family: Tetrigidae
- Genus: Tetrix
- Species: T. sierrane

Binomial name
- Tetrix sierrane Rehn & Grant, 1956

Synonyms
- Tetrix sierrana Rehn & Grant, 1956 [orth. error]

Species of grasshopper

Tetrix sierrane is a species of grasshopper in the family Tetrigidae. It is endemic to the United States.
