= Tetrix transsylvanica =

Conservation status
- Endangered (IUCN 3.1)

Scientific classification
- Kingdom: Animalia
- Phylum: Arthropoda
- Clade: Pancrustacea
- Class: Insecta
- Order: Orthoptera
- Suborder: Caelifera
- Family: Tetrigidae
- Genus: Tetrix
- Species: T. transsylvanica

Binomial name
- Tetrix transsylvanica (Bazyluk & Kis, 1960)

Synonyms
- Bienkotetrix transsylvanicus; Mishtshenkotetrix transsylvanica; Mesotettix transsylvanica; Uvarovitettix transsylvanicus

Species of grasshopper

Tetrix transsylvanica, the Transsylvanian wingless groundhopper, is a species of insect in the family Tetrigidae. It is found in Romania and Slovenia and was until recently thought to be extinct in Croatia, only for a large population to be found at Siljevec on Ivanščica and small populations on Strahinjčica, Medvednica and Zelniska gora.
