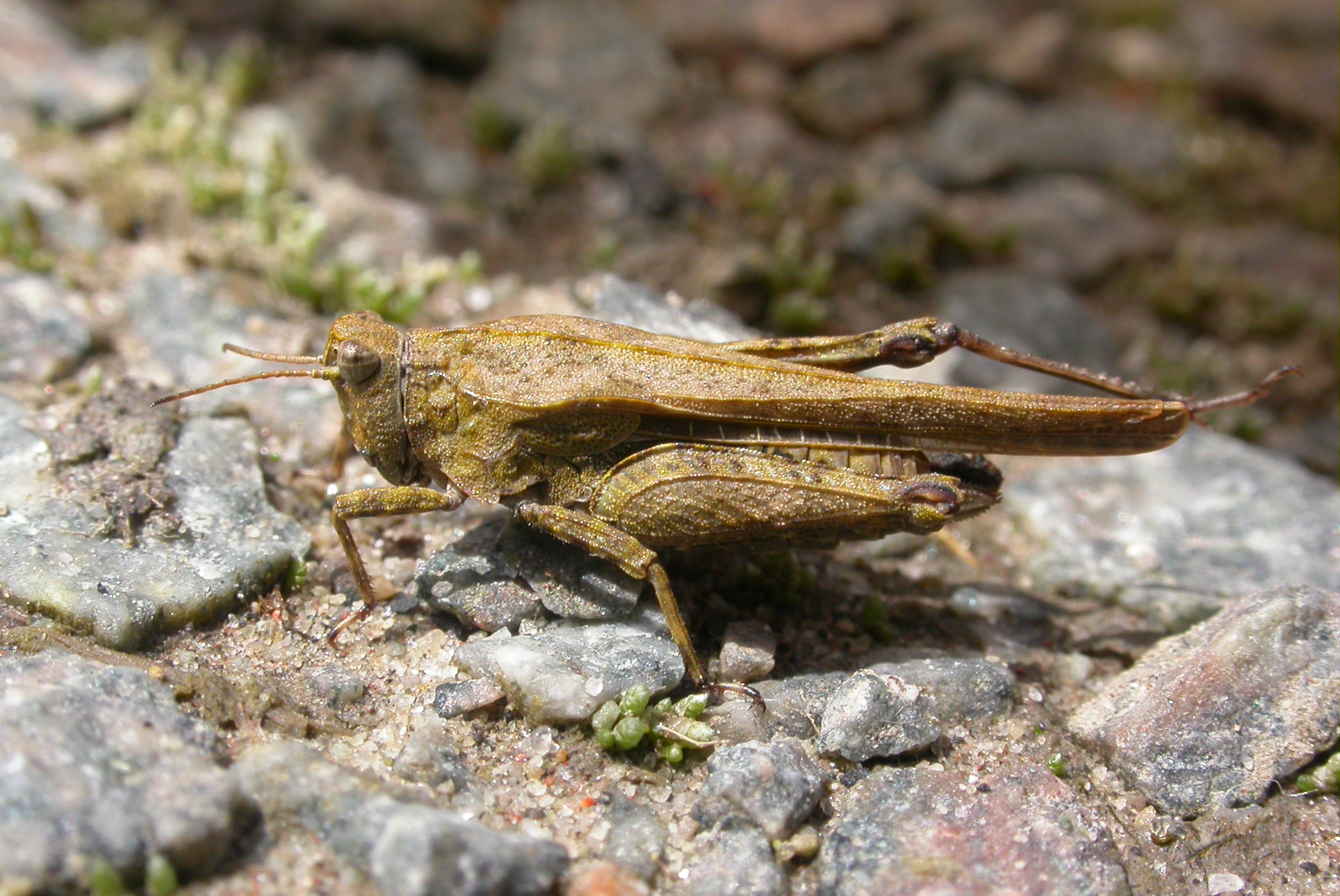
- Tetrix subulata

Scientific classification
- Kingdom: Animalia
- Phylum: Arthropoda
- Class: Insecta
- Order: Orthoptera
- Suborder: Caelifera
- Family: Tetrigidae
- Subfamily: Tetriginae
- Tribe: Tetrigini
- Genus: Tetrix; Latreille, 1802

Diversity
- 136 species.

Synonyms
- Acridium Schrank, 1801; Acridium Schaeffer, 1766; Acrydium Geoffroy, 1762; Acrydium Fabricius, 1775; Bienkotetrix Kis & Vasiliu, 1970; Depressotetrix Karaman, 1960; Macedotetrix Karaman, 1960; Tetix Caulfield, 1887; Tetratetrix Karaman, 1965; Tettis Kittary, 1849; Tettix Berthold, 1827; Uvarovitettix Bazyluk & Kis, 1960

= Tetrix (insect) =

Genus of grasshoppers

Tetrix is the type genus of ground-hoppers or pygmy grasshoppers in the tribe Tetrigini; currently (2026) there are 136 accepted species in the genus Tetrix.

== Selected Species ==
See: List of Tetrix species

- Tetrix arenosa (obscure pygmy grasshopper)
- Tetrix ceperoi (Cepero's ground-hopper)
- Tetrix ornata (ornate pygmy grasshopper)
- Tetrix subulata (slender ground-hopper) - type species
- Tetrix undulata ('common' ground-hopper)

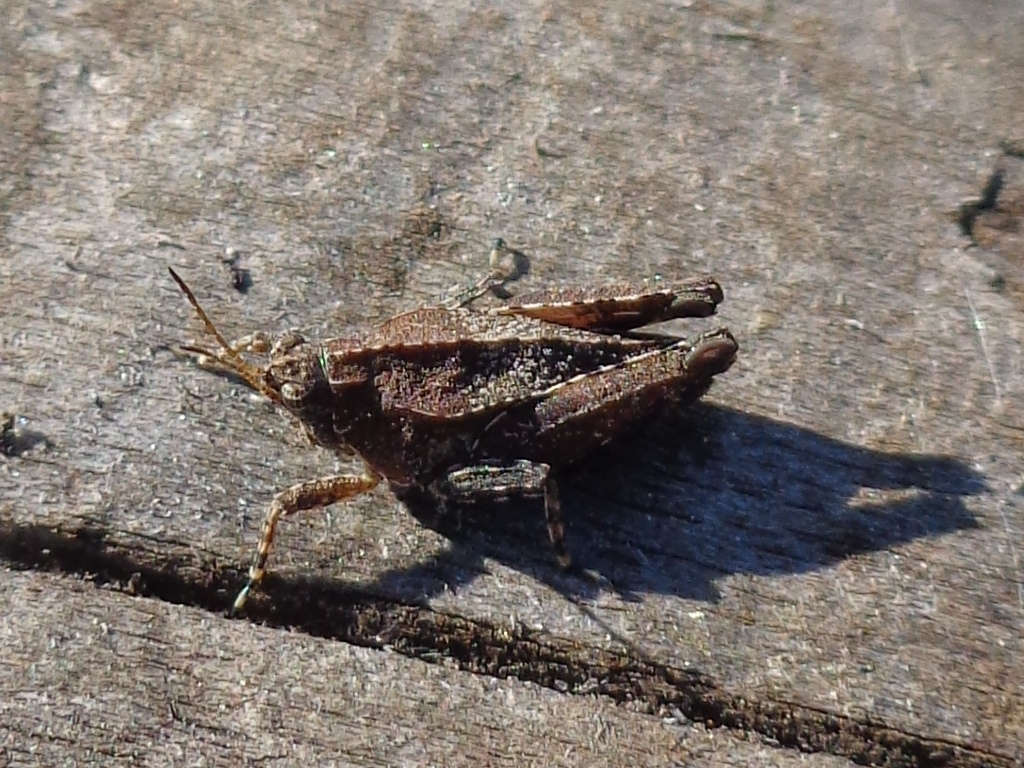
Tetrix undulata: typical brachypterous form

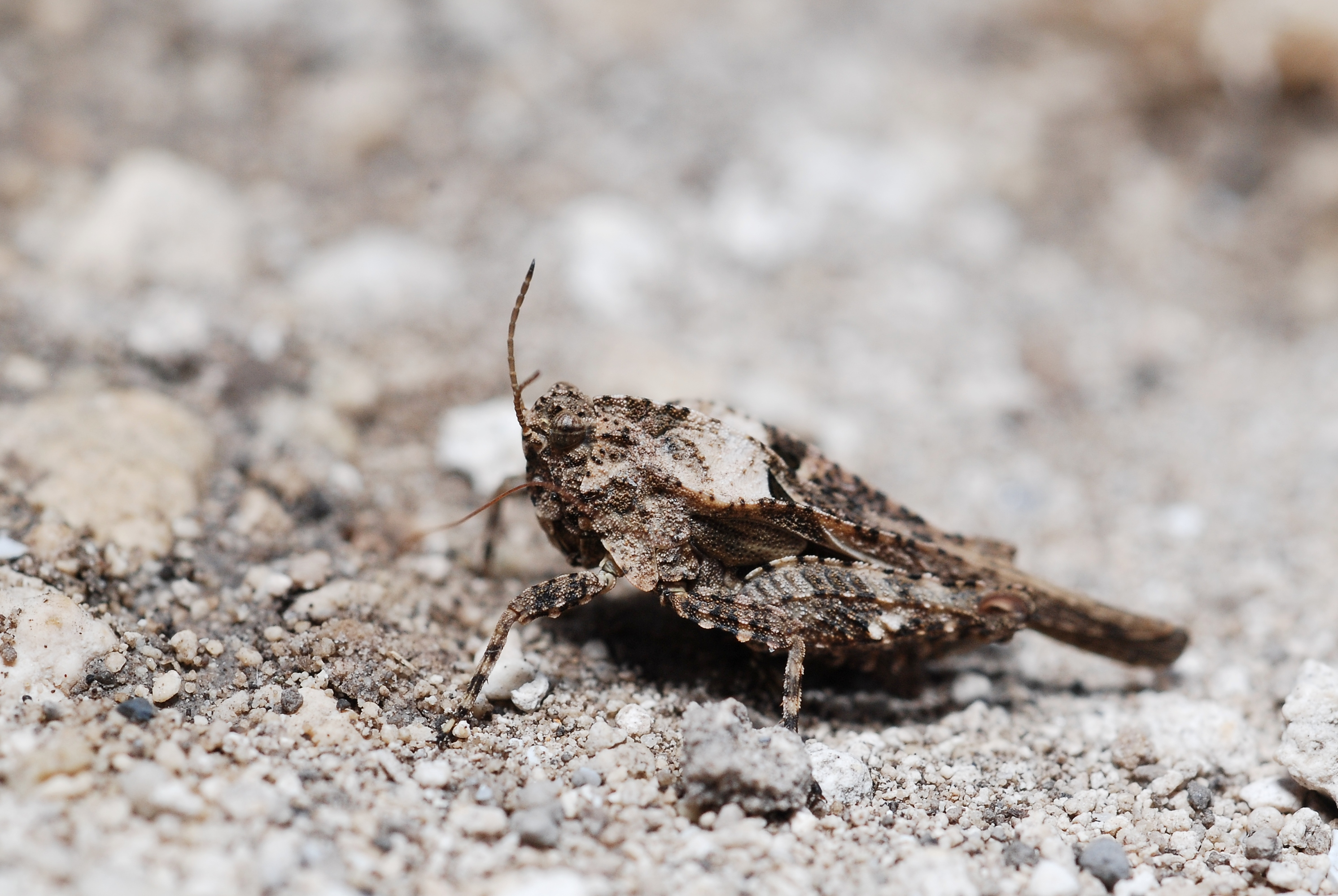
Tetrix (syn. Depressotetrix) depressa: macropronotal form

=== Geographic searches ===
Species records are mostly from the Palaearctic and Nearctic realms, with a few in Africa and Australia. Regional searches include:

Europe

1. Tetrix bipunctata (Linnaeus, 1758)
2. Tetrix bolivari Saulcy, 1901
3. Tetrix ceperoi ceperoi (Bolívar, 1887)
4. Tetrix depressa Brisout de Barneville, 1848
5. Tetrix fuliginosa (Zetterstedt, 1828)
6. Tetrix gavoyi Saulcy, 1901
7. Tetrix kraussi Saulcy, 1888
8. Tetrix nodulosa (Fieber, 1853)
9. Tetrix subulata (Linnaeus, 1758)
10. Tetrix tartara (Saussure, 1887)
11. Tetrix tenuicornis (Sahlberg, 1891)
12. Tetrix transsylvanica (Bazyluk & Kis, 1960)
13. Tetrix tuerki (Krauss, 1876)
14. Tetrix undulata (Sowerby, 1806)

Asia tropical

1. Tetrix arcunotus Ingrisch, 2001
2. Tetrix areolata Westwood, 1841
3. Tetrix bipunctata (Linnaeus, 1758)
4. Tetrix ceperoi chinensis Liang, 1998
5. Tetrix dimidiata Westwood, 1841
6. Tetrix ensifer Westwood, 1841
7. Tetrix hururanus Ingrisch, 2001
8. Tetrix longzhouensis Zheng & Jiang, 2000
9. Tetrix munda (Walker, 1871)
10. Tetrix nigricolle (Walker, 1871)
11. Tetrix pseudodepressus (Ingrisch, 2006)

North America

1. Tetrix arenosa (Hancock, 1896)
2. Tetrix brunnerii (Bolívar, 1887)
3. Tetrix japonica (Bolívar, 1887)
4. Tetrix ornata (Say, 1824)
5. Tetrix sierrana Rehn & Grant, 1956
6. Tetrix subulata (Linnaeus, 1758)
