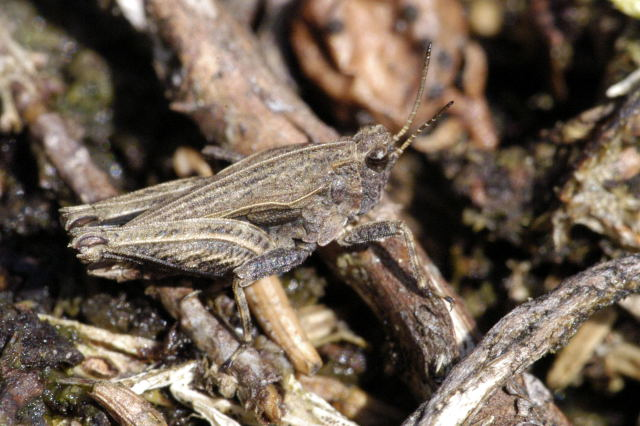
- A common ground-hopper

Scientific classification
- Domain: Eukaryota
- Kingdom: Animalia
- Phylum: Arthropoda
- Class: Insecta
- Order: Orthoptera
- Suborder: Caelifera
- Family: Tetrigidae
- Genus: Tetrix
- Species: T. undulata

Binomial name
- Tetrix undulata (Sowerby, 1806)

Synonyms
- Tetrix bifasciatum (Thunberg, 1815); Tetrix kiefferi Saulcy, 1888; Tetrix ochraceum (Zetterstedt, 1821); Tetrix scriptum (Zetterstedt, 1821); Tetrix variegatum Zetterstedt, 1821; Tetrix vittata (Zetterstedt, 1821); Tetrix nigricans (Sowerby, 1806)

= Tetrix undulata =

Species of grasshopper

Tetrix undulata, the common ground-hopper, is a species of groundhopper in the Orthoptera: Caelifera.

== Description ==
T. undulata has a body length of 6–12 mm (0.24–0.47 in); females are usually slightly larger than the males. The colour scheme varies between different individuals and different morphs are present, from darker brownish to lighter yellow-white. Individuals with predominantly light colour often have a darker pattern.

== Distribution ==
T. undulata is essentially a European species, where it is widespread: distribution ranges from Spain via France, the Benelux countries, most parts of the British Isles, Germany, Denmark, southern Scandinavia, the southwestern tip of Finland and Poland east to the Baltic States, Belarus, Ukraine, Romania and the European part of Russia. The southern boundary of their distribution runs through the Provence, the Jura, the south of Baden-Wuerttemberg, along the northern edge of the Alps and the north of Austria via the west of the Czech Republic and Poland. In the more easterly areas, the species is isolated. It is the most common species of the family in northern Europe.

== Biology ==
The habitat is usually moister grasslands such as meadows and marshes, but it may also occur in drier areas. In dry environments, however, it usually keeps to humid and cooler places, and in wet environments it tends to stick to drier areas. Food consists mainly of mosses and algae.

Development from egg to adult may take one or two years, with over-wintering as nymphs or imagos. As with other ground-hoppers, communication between males and females is largely with visual signals.
