= Tetrix ornata =

Scientific classification
- Domain: Eukaryota
- Kingdom: Animalia
- Phylum: Arthropoda
- Class: Insecta
- Order: Orthoptera
- Suborder: Caelifera
- Family: Tetrigidae
- Genus: Tetrix
- Species: T. ornata

Binomial name
- Tetrix ornata (Say, 1824)

Synonyms
- Acrydium acadicus (Scudder, 1875); Acrydium ornatum Say, 1824

Species of grasshopper

Tetrix ornata, known generally as the ornate pygmy grasshopper or ornate grouse locust, is a species of pygmy grasshopper in the family Tetrigidae. It is native to North America.

== Subspecies ==
These four subspecies belong to the species Tetrix ornata:

- Tetrix ornata hancocki (Morse, 1899)
- Tetrix ornata insolens Rehn and Grant, 1956
- Tetrix ornata occidua Rehn and Grant, 1956
- Tetrix ornata ornata (Say, 1824)
