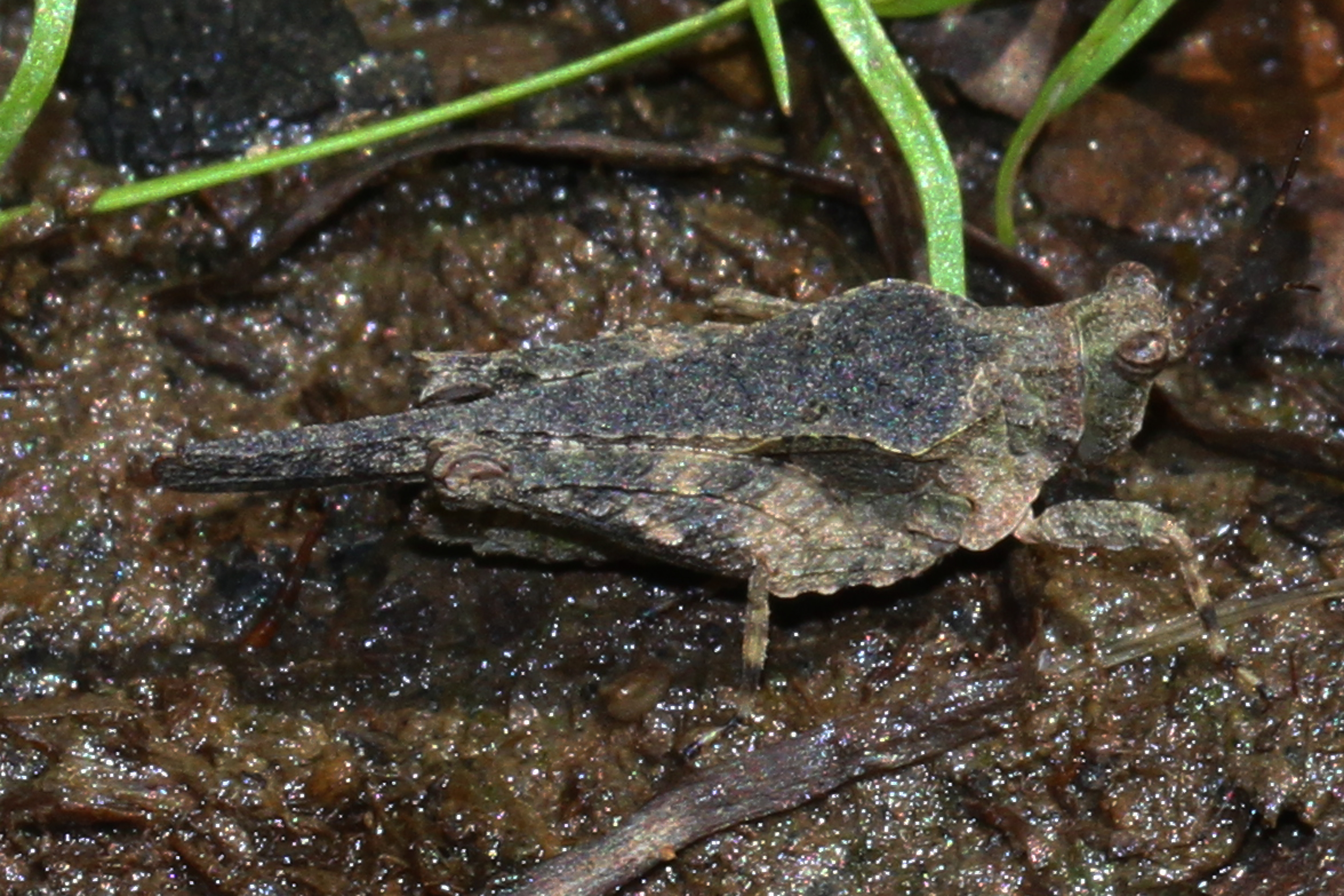

Scientific classification
- Domain: Eukaryota
- Kingdom: Animalia
- Phylum: Arthropoda
- Class: Insecta
- Order: Orthoptera
- Suborder: Caelifera
- Family: Tetrigidae
- Genus: Tetrix
- Species: T. arenosa

Binomial name
- Tetrix arenosa Burmeister, 1838

= Tetrix arenosa =

Species of grasshopper

Tetrix arenosa, known generally as the obscure pygmy grasshopper or obscure grouse locust, is a species of pygmy grasshopper in the family Tetrigidae. It is found in North America.

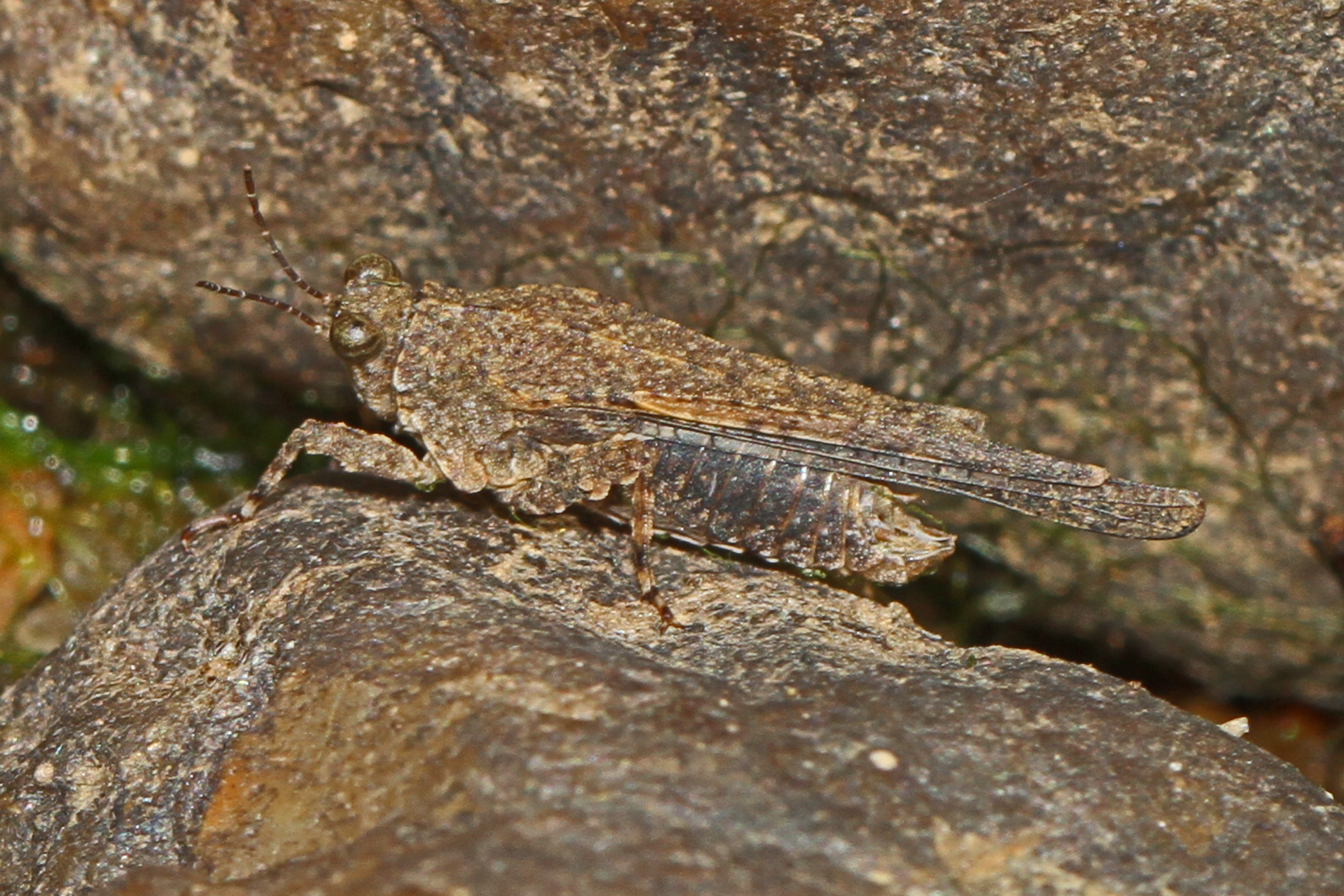
Obscure pygmy grasshopper, Tetrix arenosa

== Subspecies ==
These two subspecies belong to the species Tetrix arenosa:

- Tetrix arenosa angusta (Hancock, 1896)
- Tetrix arenosa arenosa Burmeister, 1838
