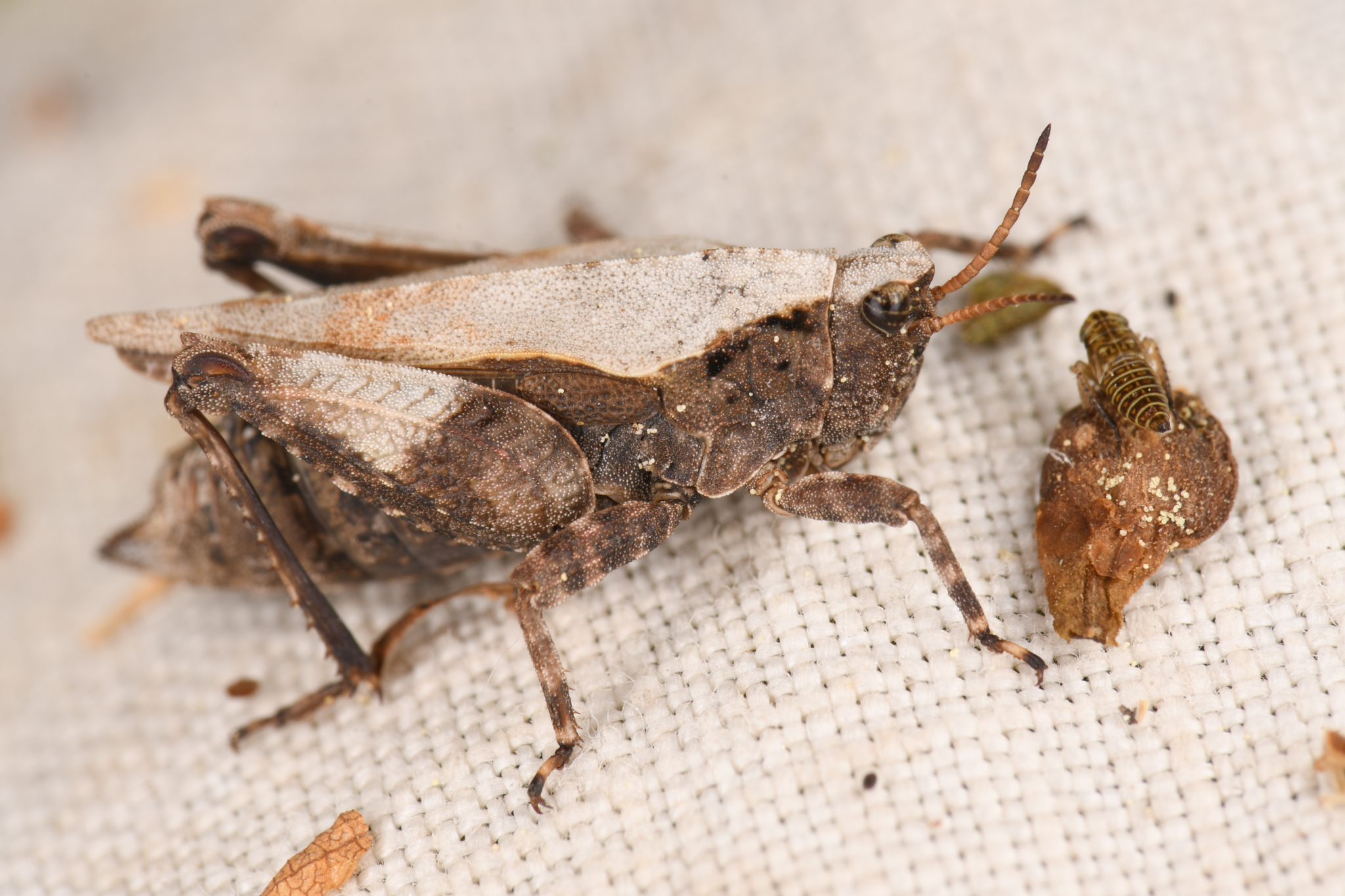

Scientific classification
- Kingdom: Animalia
- Phylum: Arthropoda
- Clade: Pancrustacea
- Class: Insecta
- Order: Orthoptera
- Suborder: Caelifera
- Family: Tetrigidae
- Genus: Tetrix
- Species: T. brunnerii

Binomial name
- Tetrix brunnerii (Bolívar, 1887)

= Tetrix brunnerii =

Species of grasshopper

Tetrix brunnerii, known generally as the Brunner's pygmy grasshopper or Brunner's grouse locust, is a species of pygmy grasshopper in the family Tetrigidae. It is found in North America.
