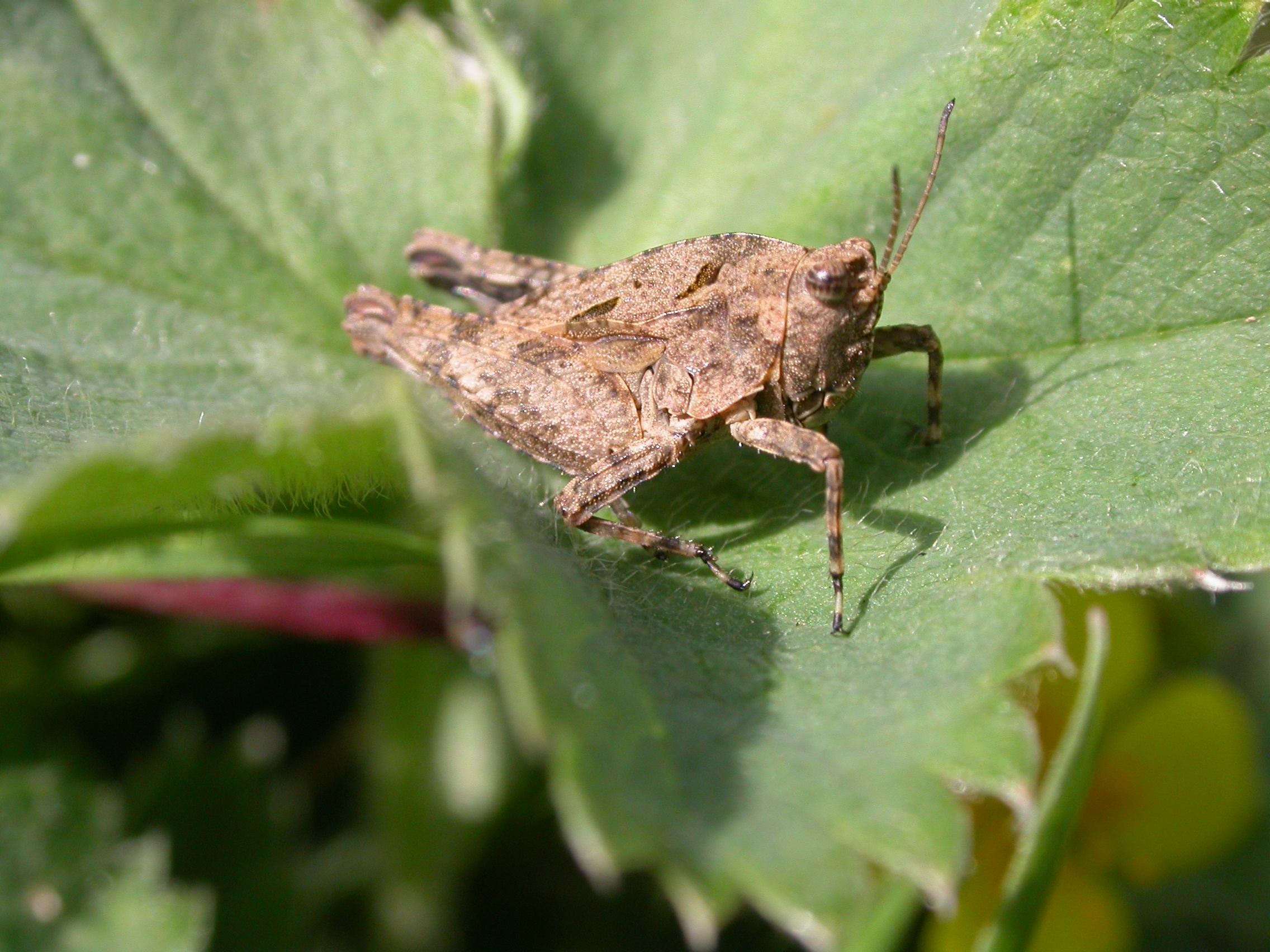

Scientific classification
- Domain: Eukaryota
- Kingdom: Animalia
- Phylum: Arthropoda
- Class: Insecta
- Order: Orthoptera
- Suborder: Caelifera
- Family: Tetrigidae
- Genus: Tetrix
- Species: T. tenuicornis

Binomial name
- Tetrix tenuicornis Sahlberg, 1891

= Tetrix tenuicornis =

Species of grasshopper

Tetrix tenuicornis, the long-horned groundhopper, is a member of the Tetrigidae family.
