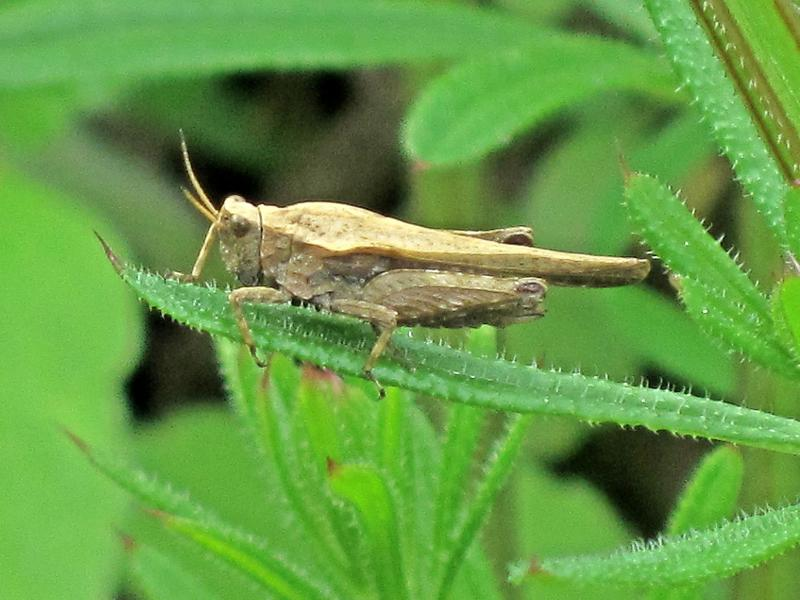
- In the Netherlands

Scientific classification
- Kingdom: Animalia
- Phylum: Arthropoda
- Class: Insecta
- Order: Orthoptera
- Suborder: Caelifera
- Family: Tetrigidae
- Genus: Tetrix
- Species: T. subulata

Binomial name
- Tetrix subulata (Linnaeus, 1761)

Synonyms
- List: Tetrix atrata Voroncovskij, 1928; Tetrix austriaca Schmidt & Devkota, 1989; Tetrix bielawskii Bazyluk, 1963; Tetrix bimaculatum (Herbst, 1786); Tetrix cristatum (Thunberg, 1815); Tetrix dorsale (Thunberg, 1815); Tetrix ephippium (Thunberg, 1815); Tetrix exclamationis Saint-Fargeau & Serville, 1825; Tetrix flavolineata Voroncovskij, 1928; Tetrix granulatum (Kirby, 1837); Tetrix incurvatus (Hancock, 1895); Tetrix luggeri (Hancock, 1899); Tetrix lunulatum (Thunberg, 1815); Tetrix marginata Saint-Fargeau & Serville, 1825; Tetrix morsei (Hancock, 1899); Tetrix oculata (Karny, 1908); Tetrix panzeri Saint-Fargeau & Serville, 1825; Tetrix quadrimaculatum (Thunberg, 1815); Tetrix sahlbergi Saulcy, 1893; Tetrix subalatum (Kirby, 1910); Tetrix thoracicum (Olivier, 1791)

= Tetrix subulata =

Species of grasshopper

Tetrix subulata is the type species of groundhopper in the genus Tetrix, known as the slender ground-hopper, awl-shaped pygmy grasshopper and the slender grouse locust. It is found across the Palearctic: in North America, across much of Europe and Asia, from the British Isles east to Siberia, and to the southern parts of North Africa.

== Description and ecology ==
T. subulata has a body length of around 9 to 15 mm; its colour is varied, from light grey to very dark or reddish brown. It usually has well-developed wings and if scared may fly away readily.

This species frequents mainly wet places: moist grasslands near streams, riverbanks and mudflats, but it is also sometimes found in drier places.

Before mating, the male and female communicate with visual signals. When a male detects a female, he approaches her step by step with a hesitant waggling gait. If the female is mating, she responds to the male's approach by moving her hind legs up and down. Adults lay eggs from August and may be found from June-July of the following year.

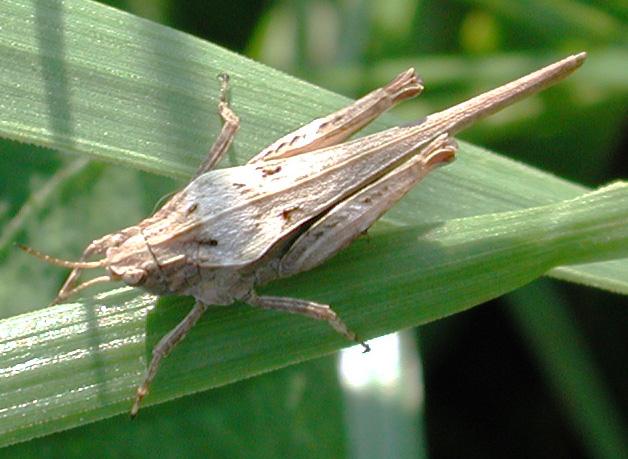

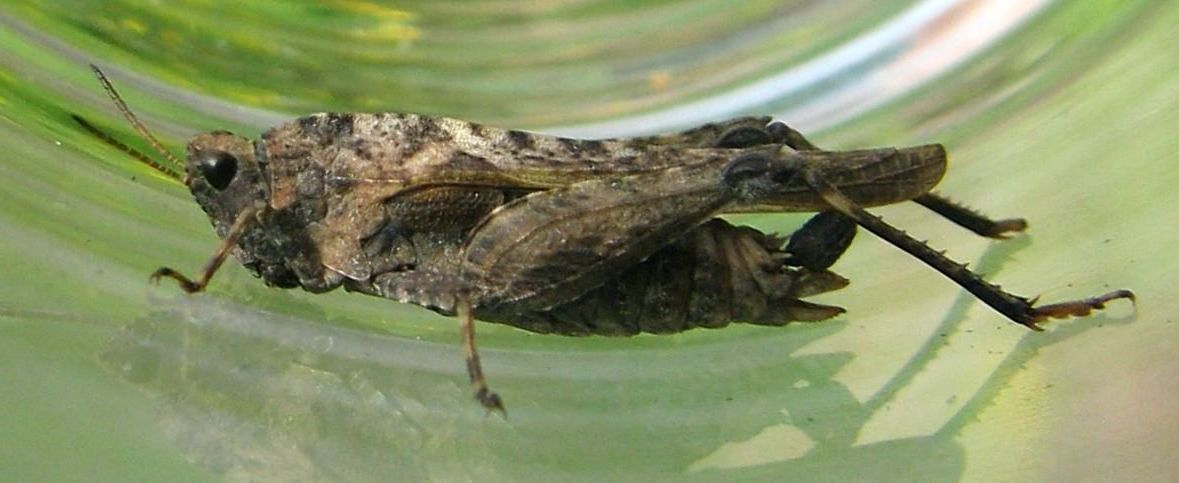
