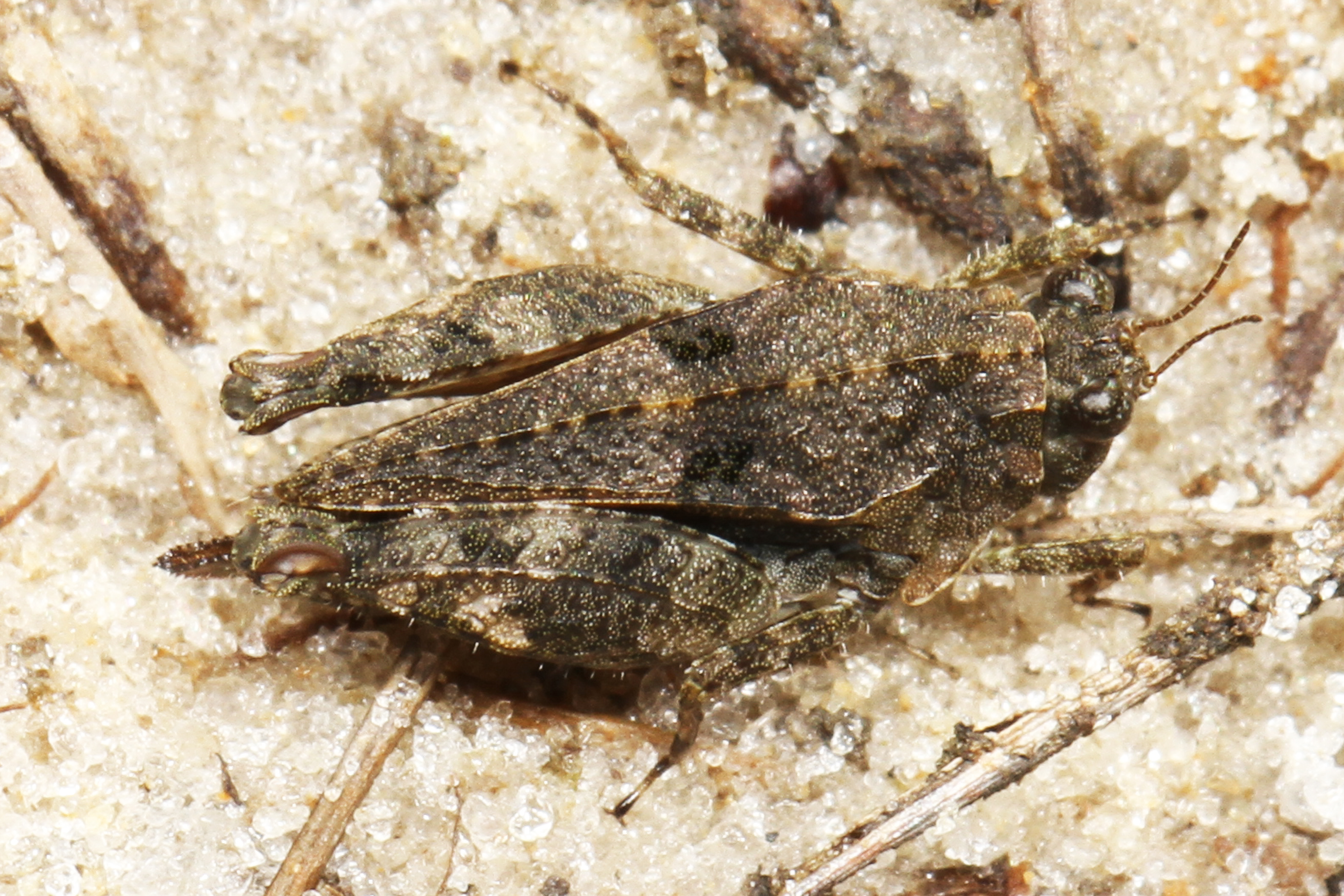
- Neotettix sp.

Scientific classification
- Kingdom: Animalia
- Phylum: Arthropoda
- Class: Insecta
- Order: Orthoptera
- Suborder: Caelifera
- Family: Tetrigidae
- Subfamily: Tetriginae

Type genus
- Tetrix Latreille, 1802

= Tetriginae =

Subfamily of grasshoppers

Tetriginae is a large subfamily of groundhoppers or pygmy grasshoppers. Members of Tetriginae occur on every continent except Antarctica.

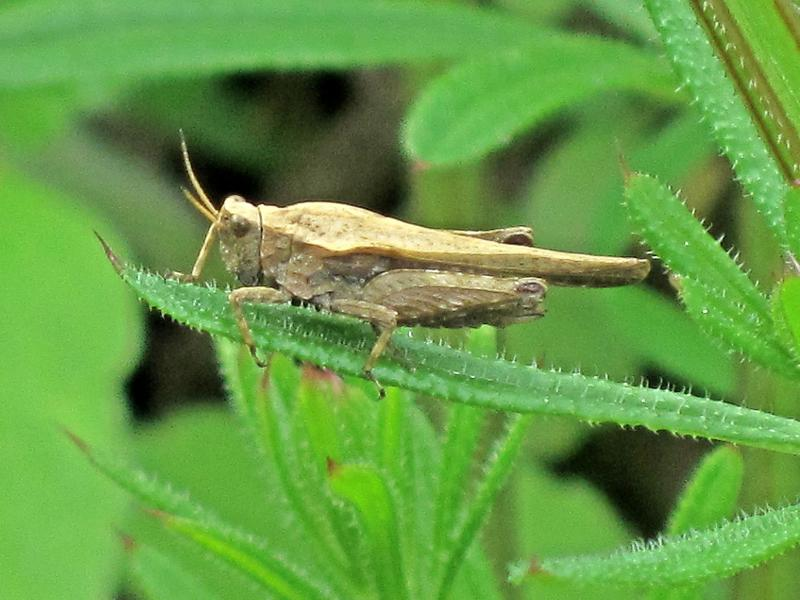
Tetrix subulata

== Tribes and genera ==
Tribes and genera include:

=== Dinotettigini ===
Auth. Günther, 1979; recorded distribution: tropical Africa, India, Philippines.

1. Afrocriotettix Günther, 1938
2. Dinotettix Bolívar, 1905
3. Ibeotettix Rehn, 1930
4. Lamellitettix Hancock, 1904
5. Marshallacris Rehn, 1948
6. Pseudamphinotus Günther, 1979

=== Tetrigini ===
Auth. Rambur, 1838

1. Alienitettix Devriese, Nguyen & Husemann, 2023
2. Clinotettix Bey-Bienko, 1933
3. Euparatettix Hancock, 1904
4. Exothotettix Zheng & Jiang, 1993
5. Hedotettix Bolívar, 1887
6. Hydrotetrix Uvarov, 1926
7. Leptacrydium Chopard, 1945
8. Paratettix Bolívar, 1887
9. Pseudosystolederus Günther, 1939
10. Rectitettix Devriese, Nguyen & Husemann, 2023
11. Tetrix Latreille, 1802
12. Tettiella Hancock, 1909
13. Thibron Rehn, 1938

=== Tribe incertae sedis ===
1. Aalatettix Zheng & Mao, 2002
2. Agkistropleuron Bruner, 1910
3. Alulatettix Liang, 1993
4. Bannatettix Zheng, 1993
5. Bienkotetrix Karaman, 1965
6. Carolinotettix Willemse, 1951
7. Clypeotettix Hancock, 1902
8. Coptottigia Bolívar, 1912
9. Cotys (insect) Bolívar, 1887
10. Crimisodes Hebard, 1932
11. Crimisus Bolívar, 1887
12. Danielatettix Cadena-Castañeda, 2021
13. Ergatettix Kirby, 1914
14. Formosatettix Tinkham, 1937
15. Formosatettixoides Zheng, 1994
16. Lamellitettigodes Günther, 1939
17. Liotettix Bolívar, 1906
18. Macquillania Günther, 1972
19. Micronotus Hancock, 1902
20. Neocoptotettix Shishodia, 1984
21. Neotettix Hancock, 1898
22. Nomotettix Morse, 1894
23. Ochetotettix Morse, 1900
24. Oxyphyllum (insect) Hancock, 1909
25. Sciotettix Ichikawa, 2001
26. Skejotettix Subedi, 2022
27. Stenodorsus Hancock, 1906
28. Teredorus Hancock, 1907
29. Tettiellona Günther, 1979
30. Xiaitettix Zheng & Liang, 1993
31. †Succinotettix Piton, 1938
