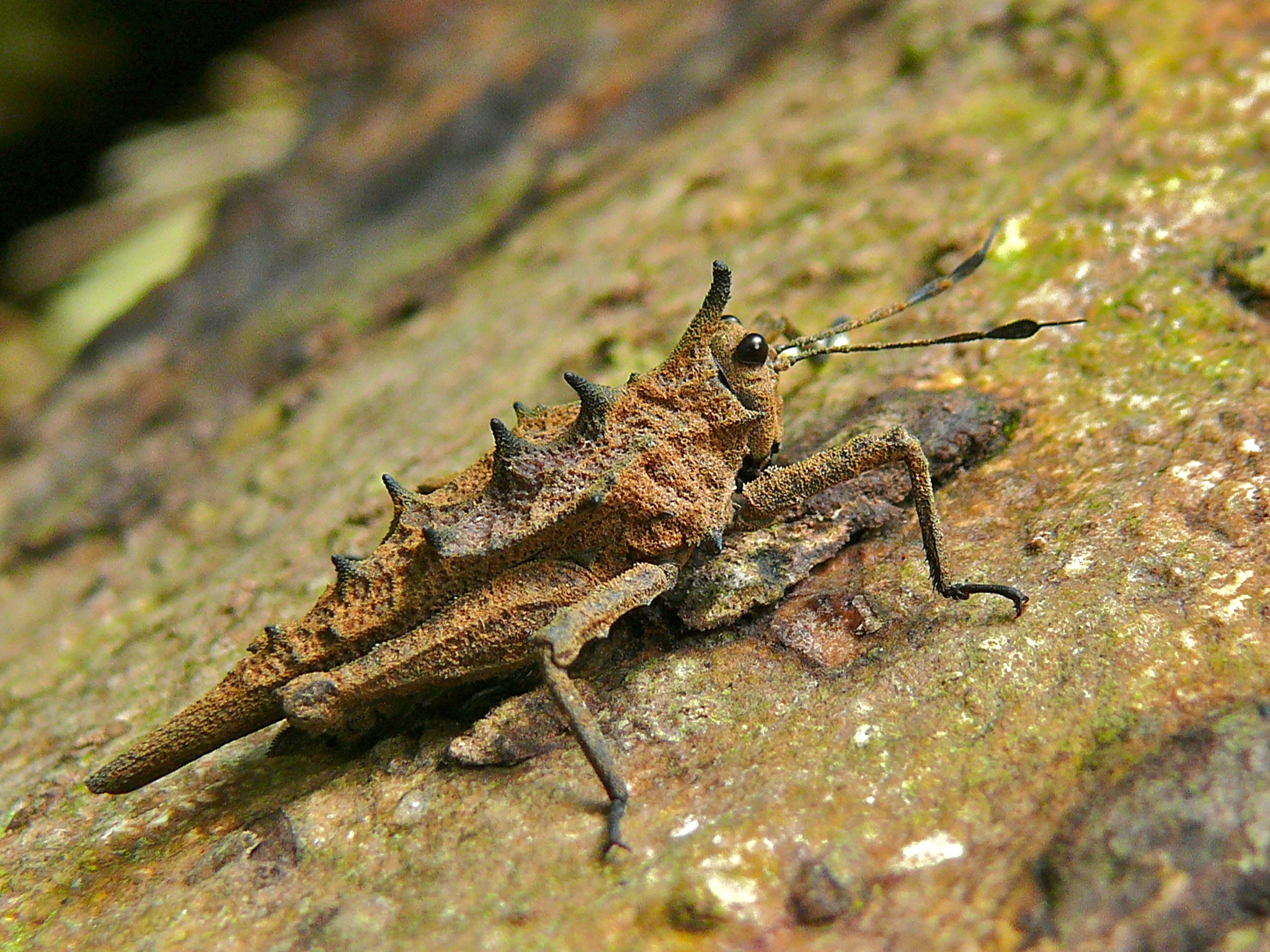

Scientific classification
- Kingdom: Animalia
- Phylum: Arthropoda
- Clade: Pancrustacea
- Class: Insecta
- Order: Orthoptera
- Suborder: Caelifera
- Family: Tetrigidae
- Subfamily: Scelimeninae
- Tribe: Discotettigini
- Genus: Discotettix
- Species: D. belzebuth

Binomial name
- Discotettix belzebuth (Serville, 1838)

Synonyms
- Discotettix adenanii Mahmood, Idris & Salmah, 2007; Discotettix armatus Costa, 1864

= Discotettix belzebuth =

Species of Caelifera

Discotettix belzebuth is a groundhopper species found in western Malesia, belonging to the subfamily Scelimeninae; it is the type species of its genus.

== See also ==
- Phaesticus azemii
- Discotettix selangori
- Scelimena hafizaii
- Scelimena razalii
- Gavialidium phangensum
