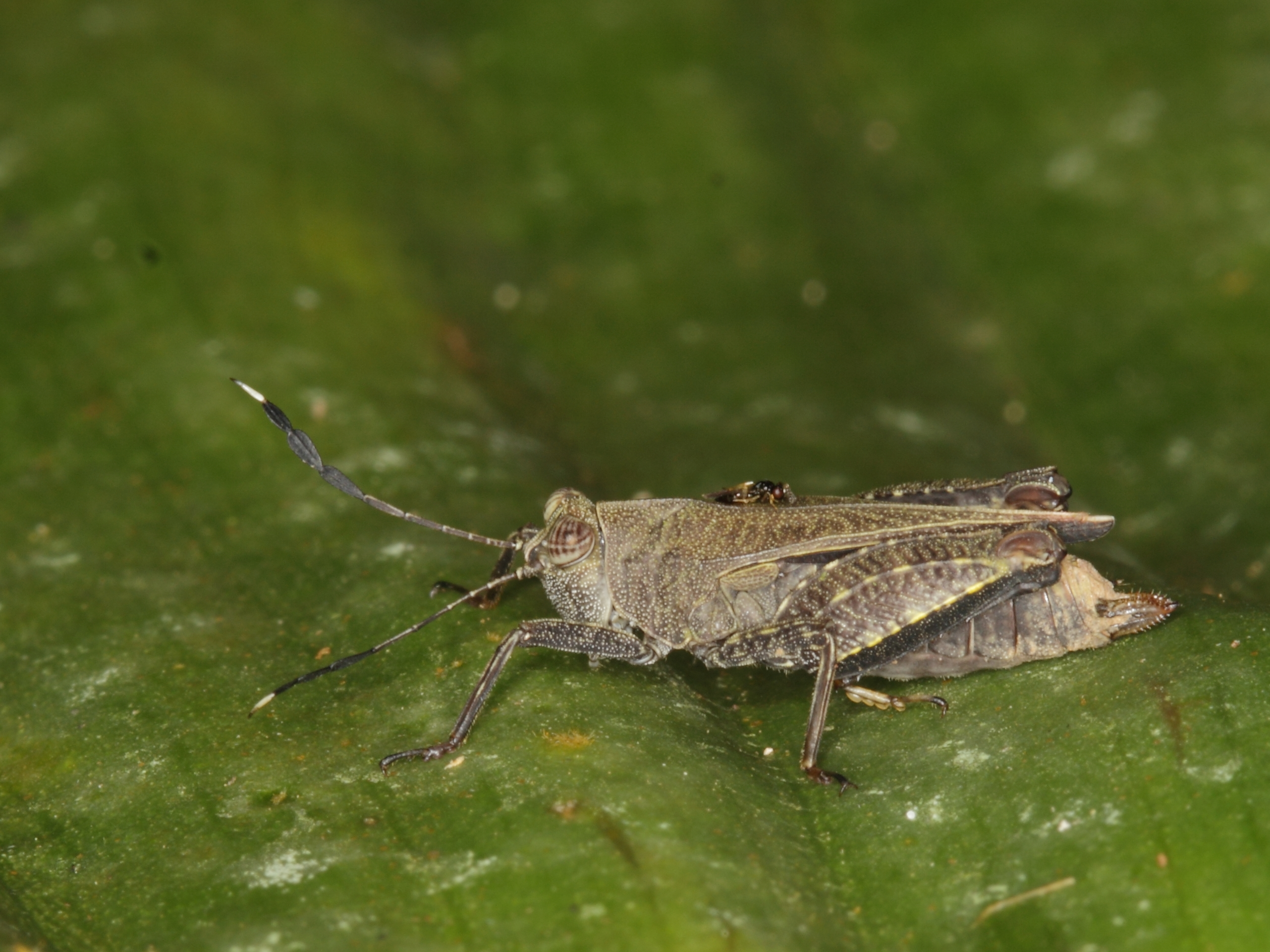

Scientific classification
- Kingdom: Animalia
- Phylum: Arthropoda
- Clade: Pancrustacea
- Class: Insecta
- Order: Orthoptera
- Suborder: Caelifera
- Family: Tetrigidae
- Tribe: Xistrellini
- Genus: Phaesticus
- Species: P. mellerborgi

Binomial name
- Phaesticus mellerborgi (Stål, 1855)

Synonyms
- Phaesticus azemii Mahmood, Idris & Salmah, 2007

= Phaesticus mellerborgi =

Species of Caelifera

Phaesticus mellerborgi is a groundhopper found in China, Indo-China and Malesia, now placed in the tribe Xistrellini.

== See also ==
- Discotettix adenanii
- Discotettix selangori
- Scelimena hafizaii
- Scelimena razalii
- Gavialidium phangensum
