= Eufalconius =

Scientific classification
- Domain: Eukaryota
- Kingdom: Animalia
- Phylum: Arthropoda
- Class: Insecta
- Order: Orthoptera
- Suborder: Caelifera
- Family: Tetrigidae
- Subfamily: Scelimeninae
- Tribe: Discotettigini
- Genus: Eufalconius
- Species: E. pendleburyi

Binomial name
- Eufalconius pendleburyi Günther, 1938

Synonyms
- Hancockitettix Storozhenko & Pushkar, 2017 (genus); Gavialidium phangensum Mahmood, Idris & Salmah, 2007

Species of grasshopper

Eufalconius pendleburyi is a groundhopper species found in Malaysia, belonging to the tribe Scelimenini. It is the only species in the monotypic genus Eufalconius.

== See also ==
- Phaesticus azemii
- Discotettix adenanii
- Discotettix selangori
- Scelimena hafizaii
- Scelimena razalii
