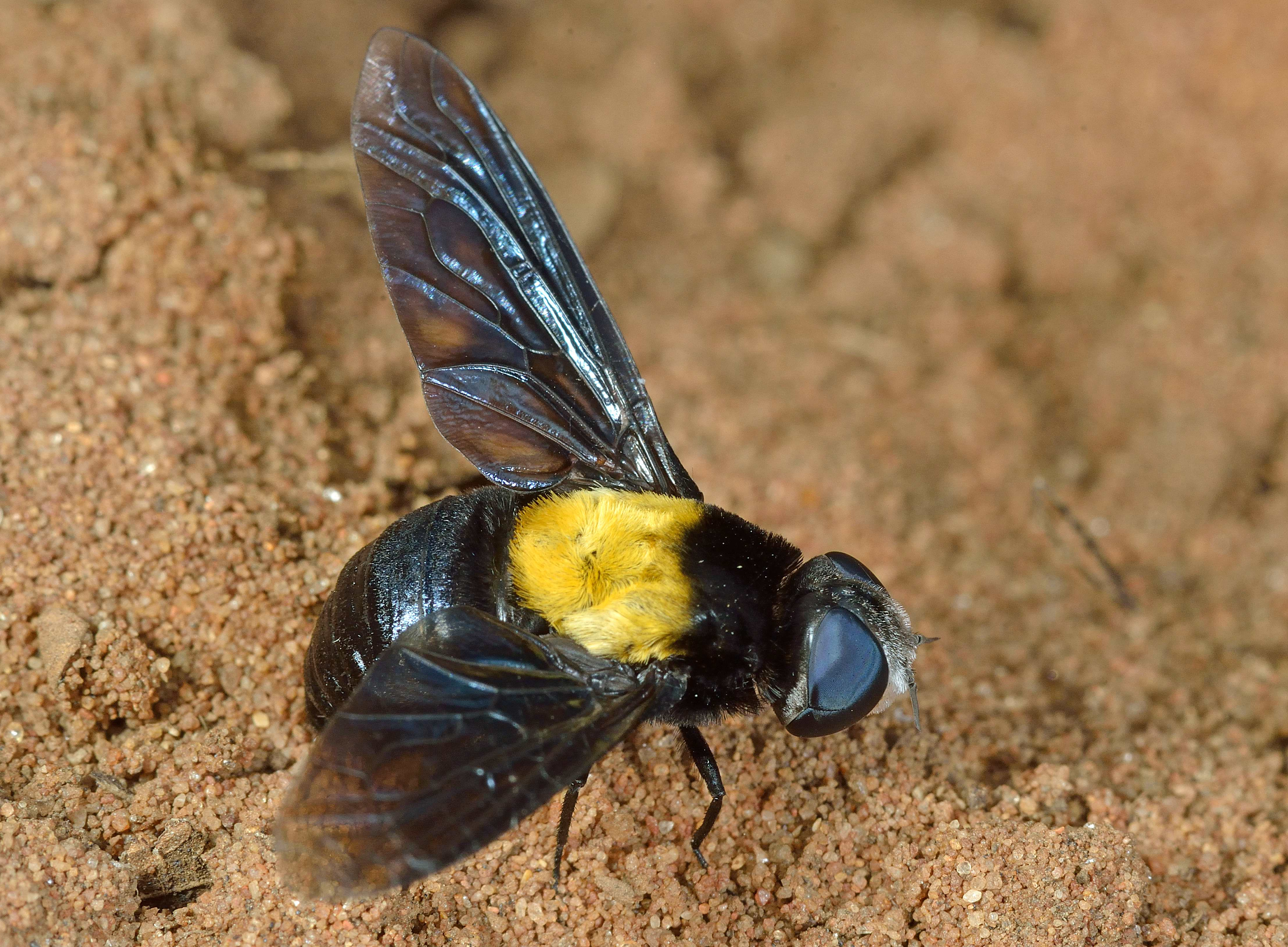
- Female M. xylocopae
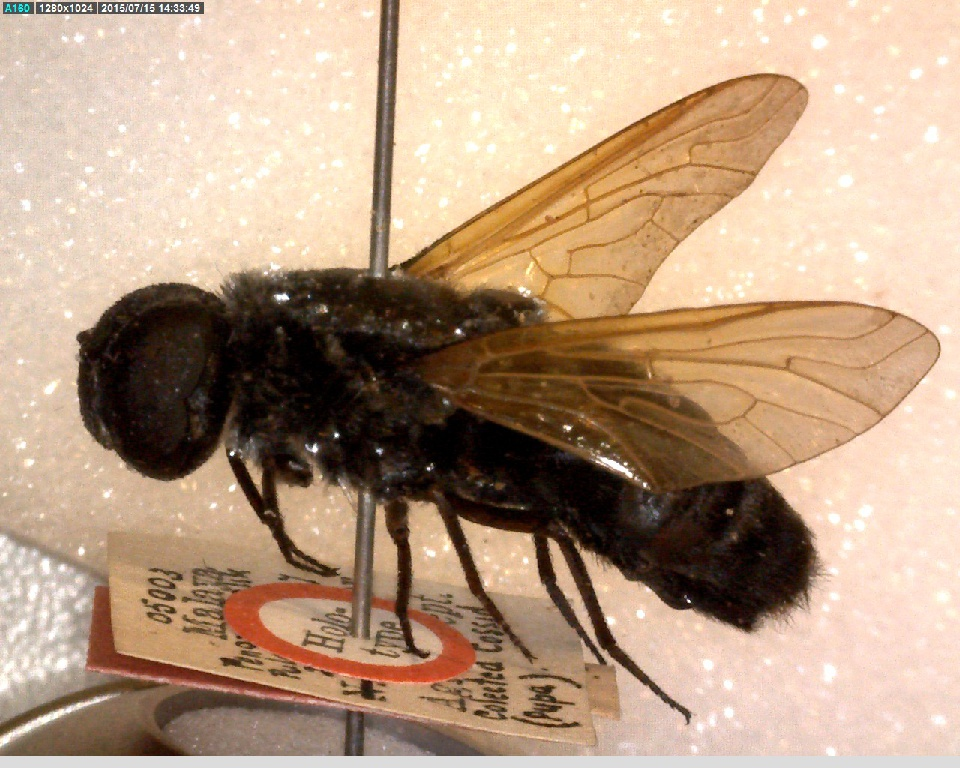
- Female M. goliath

Scientific classification
- Domain: Eukaryota
- Kingdom: Animalia
- Phylum: Arthropoda
- Class: Insecta
- Order: Diptera
- Family: Bombyliidae
- Tribe: Villini
- Genus: Marleyimyia; Hesse, 1956

Type species
- Marleyimyia natalensis Hesse, 1956

= Marleyimyia =

Genus of flies

Marleyimyia is a genus of bee fly. It was named by Albert John Hesse in 1956; the name is in honor of Harold Walter Bell-Marley. As of 2015 it consists of three species:

- M. goliath (Oldroyd, 1951) — Peninsular Malaysia
- M. natalensis Hesse, 1956 — Southern Africa
- M. xylocopae Marshall & Evenhuis, 2015 — Southern Africa
