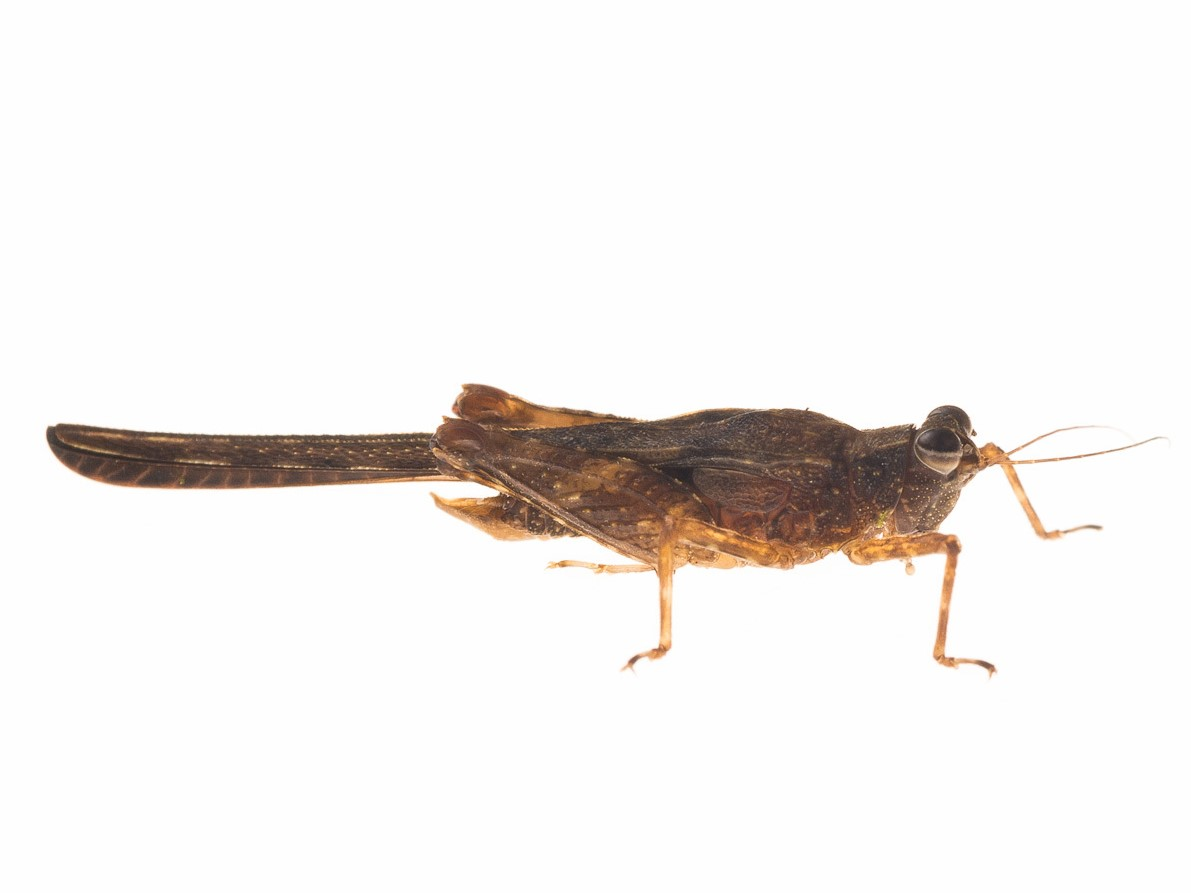
- Falconius dubius

Scientific classification
- Domain: Eukaryota
- Kingdom: Animalia
- Phylum: Arthropoda
- Class: Insecta
- Order: Orthoptera
- Suborder: Caelifera
- Family: Tetrigidae
- Subfamily: Scelimeninae
- Tribe: Scelimenini
- Genus: Falconius; Bolívar, 1898

= Falconius =

Genus of Caelifera

External image
- Images at iNaturalist

Falconius is a genus of Asian groundhoppers (Orthoptera: Caelifera) in the tribe Scelimenini, erected by Ignacio Bolívar in 1898. Species have been recorded from India, Indochina and Malesia.

== Species ==
The Orthoptera Species File lists:

1. Falconius annuliconus Liang, 2000
2. Falconius becvari (Buzzetti & Devriese, 2008)
3. Falconius bedoti (Bolívar, 1909)
4. Falconius bogor Storozhenko, 2020
5. Falconius clavatus Bolívar, 1898
6. Falconius clavitarsis (Bolívar, 1887) - type species (as Criotettix clavitarsis Bolívar)
7. Falconius deceptor Günther, 1938
8. Falconius dubius Günther, 1938
9. Falconius elephant Storozhenko, 2017
10. Falconius gestroi Bolívar, 1898
11. Falconius guangxiensis Zheng & Jiang, 1997
12. Falconius hainanensis Liang, 2000
13. Falconius inaequalis (Brunner von Wattenwyl, 1893)
14. Falconius karnyi Günther, 1938
15. Falconius longicornis Deng, Zheng & Wei, 2009
16. Falconius longidorsalis (Zheng & Yang, 2015)
17. Falconius palawanicus Günther, 1938
18. Falconius planitarsus (Hancock, 1907)
19. Falconius pseudoclavitarsis Günther, 1938
20. Falconius tschernovi Storozhenko, 2014
21. Falconius undatifemura Zheng & Wang, 2006
