= Hebarditettix =

Scientific classification
- Kingdom: Animalia
- Phylum: Arthropoda
- Class: Insecta
- Order: Orthoptera
- Suborder: Caelifera
- Family: Tetrigidae
- Subfamily: Scelimeninae
- Genus: Hebarditettix; Bolívar, 1898

Genus of Caelifera

External image
- Images at iNaturalist

Hebarditettix is a genus of Asian groundhoppers (Orthoptera: Caelifera) in the subfamily Scelimeninae (tribe unassigned), erected by Klaus Günther in 1938. Species have been recorded from India, China and Indochina.

== Species ==
The Orthoptera Species File lists:

1. Hebarditettix armatus (Hancock, 1915)
2. Hebarditettix brachynotus Deng & Zheng, 2013
3. Hebarditettix chamensis Storozhenko, 2017
4. Hebarditettix dolichonota Zheng, 2008
5. Hebarditettix fuscus Storozhenko, 2017
6. Hebarditettix gibbus Storozhenko, 2017
7. Hebarditettix intermedius Storozhenko, 2017
8. Hebarditettix lobatus (Hancock, 1912)
9. Hebarditettix longipennis Deng, Chen & Li, 2017
10. Hebarditettix magnus Storozhenko, 2017
11. Hebarditettix oculatus Storozhenko, 2017
12. Hebarditettix quadratus (Hancock, 1915) – type species (as Bolotettix quadratus Hancock, 1915)
13. Hebarditettix sanduki Subedi, Kasalo & Skejo, 2024
14. Hebarditettix triangularis (Hancock, 1915)
15. Hebarditettix vallis Zha & Wen, 2016
