= Gavialidium =

Scientific classification
- Domain: Eukaryota
- Kingdom: Animalia
- Phylum: Arthropoda
- Class: Insecta
- Order: Orthoptera
- Suborder: Caelifera
- Family: Tetrigidae
- Tribe: Discotettigini
- Genus: Gavialidium; Saussure, 1862

Species
- See text

Genus of grasshoppers

Gavialidium is a genus of insects found in India and Sri Lanka, belonging to the Tetrigidae family of Orthopterans in the tribe Discotettigini.

== Species ==
Gavialidium includes the species:

- Gavialidium carli Hebard, 1930
- Gavialidium crocodilum Saussure, 1862 - type species (as Scelymena crocodilus Saussure)
