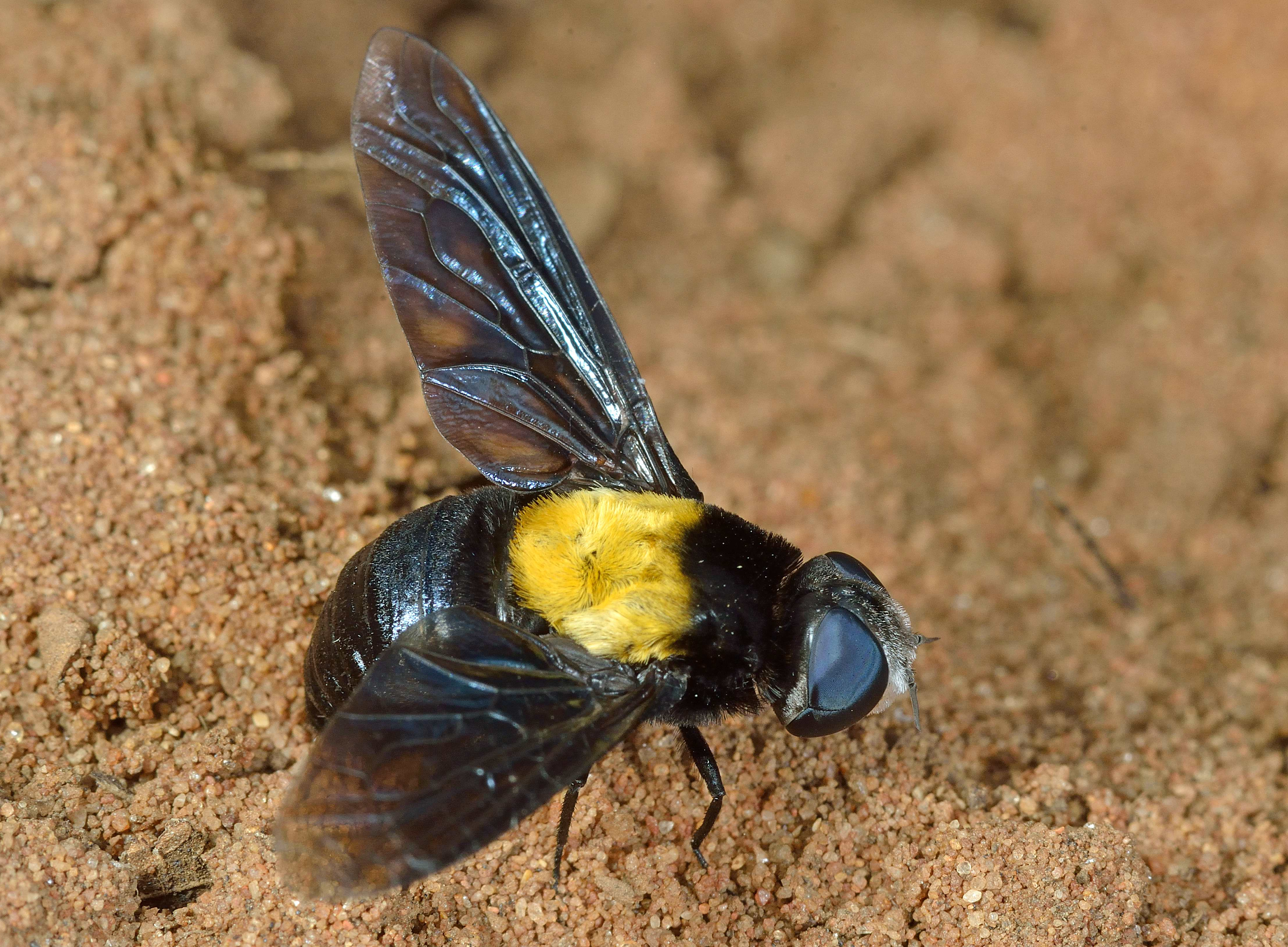
- Female holotype, photographed in Ndumo Game Preserve, South Africa on 1 December 2014

Scientific classification
- Kingdom: Animalia
- Phylum: Arthropoda
- Class: Insecta
- Order: Diptera
- Family: Bombyliidae
- Subfamily: Anthracinae
- Tribe: Villoestrini
- Genus: Marleyimyia
- Species: M. xylocopae

Binomial name
- Marleyimyia xylocopae Marshall & Evenhuis, 2015

= Marleyimyia xylocopae =

Species of fly

Marleyimyia xylocopae is a species of bee fly from South Africa that has a similarity to the patterning of a carpenter bee Xylocopa flavicollis (De Geer, 1778) found in the region. The species is considered to be distinctive and only one of three within the genus Marleyimyia. The other members of the genus are Marleyimyia goliath described from Peninsular Malaysia and M. natalensis from southern Africa. Members in the genus have been presumed to be crepuscular or nocturnal but this species was found to be diurnal.

== Controversy about photography-based taxonomy ==
The species was unusual in being described on the basis of two photographs, without the collection, designation of a holotype specimen and deposition in a suitable repository. This method provoked in 2016 a controversy among taxonomists, with a paper arguing for photography-based taxonomy by Pape (with 34 signatories), quickly followed by papers arguing against it by Krell (with 5 signatories) and Ceríaco et al. (with 496 authors).

In 2017, the ICZN published a declaration, adding recommendations to the ICZN Code. This clarified that it is in fact acceptable to describe a new species without a physical type specimen (for example, describing a species from photos), but "only under strict conditions". This declaration was proposed by a committee on "typeless species" formed in 2016, composed of commissioners Krell (chair), Ballerio and Bouchard.

== See also ==
- Eulophophyllum kirki Ingrisch & Riede, 2016 — a katydid described only from photographs.
