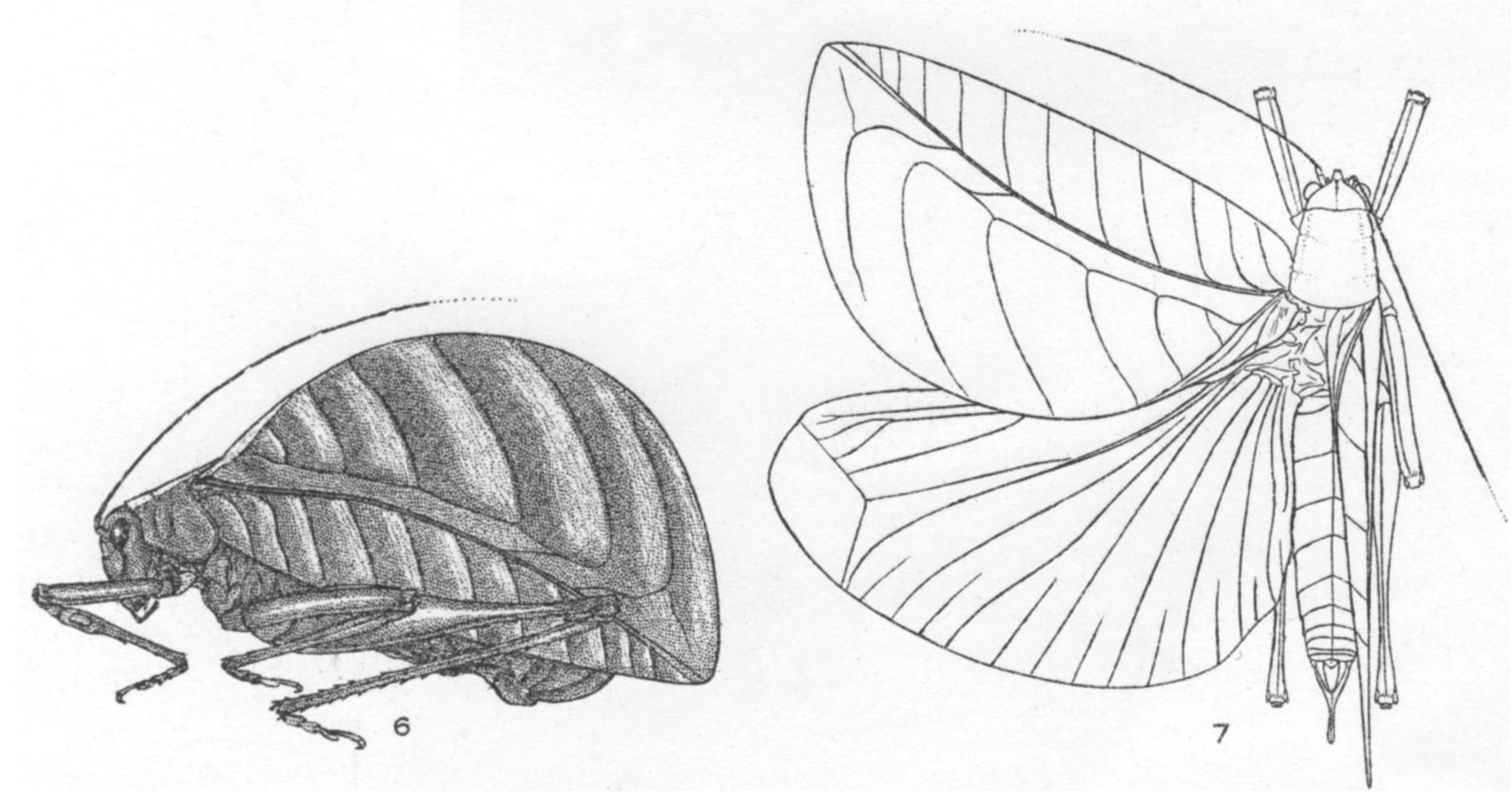
- E. thaumasium ♀.

Scientific classification
- Domain: Eukaryota
- Kingdom: Animalia
- Phylum: Arthropoda
- Class: Insecta
- Order: Orthoptera
- Suborder: Ensifera
- Family: Tettigoniidae
- Subfamily: Phaneropterinae
- Genus: Eulophophyllum; Hebard, 1922

Type species
- Eulophophyllum thaumasium Hebard, 1922

= Eulophophyllum =

Genus of cricket-like animals

Eulophophyllum is a genus of leaf mimicking bush crickets or katydids in the subfamily Phaneropterinae. It was originally circumscribed in 1922 by Morgan Hebard as a monospecific genus for the species E. thaumasium, but two new species were described and added to the genus in 2016.

== Species ==
The type species E. thaumasium was found originally in Labuan island, with the other species recorded from Sabah; E. lobulatum appears to be endemic to Mount Kinabalu where there is National Park protection. The Orthoptera Species File currently lists:

1. Eulophophyllum thaumasium Hebard, 1922
2. Eulophophyllum lobulatum Ingrisch & Riede, 2016
3. Eulophophyllum kirki Ingrisch & Riede, 2016
