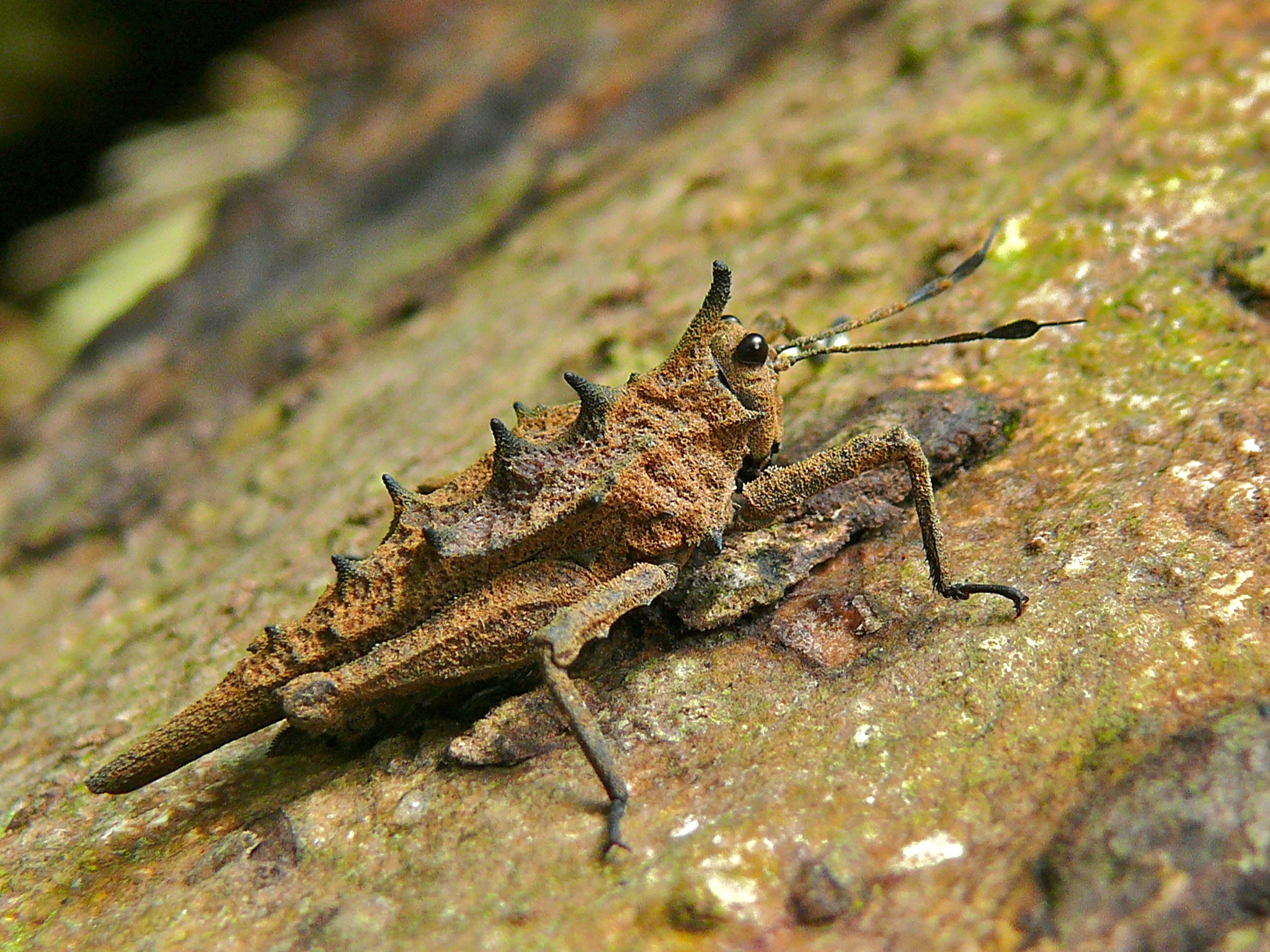
- Discotettix belzebuth

Scientific classification
- Domain: Eukaryota
- Kingdom: Animalia
- Phylum: Arthropoda
- Class: Insecta
- Order: Orthoptera
- Suborder: Caelifera
- Family: Tetrigidae
- Tribe: Discotettigini
- Genus: Discotettix; Costa, 1864

Species
- See text

Synonyms
- Mnesarchus Stål, 1877

= Discotettix =

Genus of Caelifera

Discotettix is a genus of groundhoppers (Orthoptera: Tetrigidae) found in Malesia, Brunei, Indonesia and the Philippines; they may be known as "spiky pygmy devils". After revision, it is the type genus of the tribe Discotettigini and now placed in the subfamily Scelimeninae.

== Species ==
The Orthoptera Species File lists two subgenera:

Discotettix (Discotettix) Costa, 1864

1. Discotettix aruanus Skejo, Pushkar & Tumbrinck, 2022
2. Discotettix belzebuth (Serville, 1838) - type species (as D. armatus Costa, 1864)
  synonym: Discotettix adenanii Mahmood, Idris & Salmah, 2007
3. Discotettix doriae Bolívar, 1898
4. Discotettix kirscheyi Skejo, Pushkar, Tumbrinck & Tan, 2022
5. Discotettix selysi Bolívar, 1887
  synonym: Discotettix selangori Mahmood, Idris & Salmah, 2007
6. Discotettix sumatrensis Skejo, Pushkar & Tumbrinck, 2022

Discotettix (Mnesarchus) Stål, 1877

1. Discotettix scabridus (Stål, 1877)

== Disconius ==
The species Disconius shelfordi (Hancock, 1907) from Borneo, was placed in new genus Disconius Skejo, Pushkar & Tumbrinck, 2022: having previously been described as Discotettix shelfordi Hancock, 1907.

External image
- Images of Disconius at iNaturalist
