= Arulenus =

Scientific classification
- Domain: Eukaryota
- Kingdom: Animalia
- Phylum: Arthropoda
- Class: Insecta
- Order: Orthoptera
- Suborder: Caelifera
- Family: Tetrigidae
- Subfamily: Scelimeninae
- Genus: Arulenus; Stål, 1877

Type species
- Arulenus validispinus Stål, 1877

Genus of grasshoppers

Arulenus is a genus of pygmy grasshopper. As of 2016, it consists of two species:

- Arulenus miae Skejo & Caballero, 2016
- Arulenus validispinus Stål, 1877

Both species are endemic to Mindanao in the Philippines.

== Description ==
Characteristic features of this genus include: the lack of tegmina and of alae, a smooth pronotum with large, slightly wrinkled spines on its discus, and outwardly turned lateral paranotal lobes.

== Taxonomic history ==
Carl Stål circumscribed Arulenus in 1877 for the species A. validispinus and A. punctatus, which Stål described in the same paper. In 1887, Ignacio Bolívar transferred A. punctatus to its own, new genus Hirrius, giving it the name Hirrius punctatus. Arulenus would be considered a monospecific genus until 2016 with Josip Skejo and Joy Honezza S. Caballero's description of Arulenus miae.
