= Zhengitettix =

Scientific classification
- Domain: Eukaryota
- Kingdom: Animalia
- Phylum: Arthropoda
- Class: Insecta
- Order: Orthoptera
- Suborder: Caelifera
- Superfamily: Tetrigoidea
- Family: Tetrigidae
- Subfamily: Scelimeninae
- Genus: Zhengitettix; Liang, 1994

Genus of grasshoppers

External image
- Image at iNaturalist

Zhengitettix is an Asian genus of ground-hoppers (Orthoptera: Caelifera) in the subfamily Scelimeninae and not assigned to any tribe.

== Species ==
Zhengitettix includes the species:

- Zhengitettix albitarsus Storozhenko, 2013
- Zhengitettix curvispinus Liang, Jiang & Liu, 2007
- Zhengitettix extraneus Storozhenko, 2013
- Zhengitettix hainanensis Liang, 1994 - type species
- Zhengitettix hosticus Storozhenko, 2013
- Zhengitettix mucronatus Storozhenko, 2013
- Zhengitettix nigrofemurus Deng, Zheng & Wei, 2010
- Zhengitettix obliquespicula Zheng, Jiang & Liu, 2005
- Zhengitettix palawanensis Storozhenko, 2013
- Zhengitettix ruangsuwani Dawwrueng & Doodduem, 2014
- Zhengitettix spinulentus Storozhenko, 2013
- Zhengitettix taytayensis Storozhenko, 2013
- Zhengitettix transpicula Zheng & Jiang, 2002
- Zhengitettix triangulari Zheng, Zeng & Ou, 2010
