= Eulophophyllum kirki =

Scientific classification
- Domain: Eukaryota
- Kingdom: Animalia
- Phylum: Arthropoda
- Class: Insecta
- Order: Orthoptera
- Suborder: Ensifera
- Family: Tettigoniidae
- Subfamily: Phaneropterinae
- Genus: Eulophophyllum
- Species: E. kirki

Binomial name
- Eulophophyllum kirki Ingrisch & Riede, 2016

Species of cricket-like animal

Eulophophyllum kirki is a katydid found in Danum Valley Conservation Area in the state of Sabah, Malaysia. It is in the genus Eulophophyllum in the subfamily Phaneropterinae. It was described in 2016.

It was highlighted as one of SUNY-ESF's "Top 10 New Species of 2017".

This species was described and named just on photographs, which has been criticized by some experts.

== Description ==
Its body is a pink and reddish brown color with wings, veins, and legs that are light green pastel colors. It is leaf like in appearance with seven to eight dorsal branches across its surface.

== See also ==
- Arulenus miae Skejo & Caballero, 2016 — a pygmy grasshopper described after scientists saw a photograph of it on Facebook.
- Marleyimyia xylocopae Marshall & Evenhuis, 2015 — a bee fly described only from photographs.
