= Amphibotettix =

Scientific classification
- Kingdom: Animalia
- Phylum: Arthropoda
- Clade: Pancrustacea
- Class: Insecta
- Order: Orthoptera
- Suborder: Caelifera
- Family: Tetrigidae
- Subfamily: Scelimeninae
- Tribe: Scelimenini
- Genus: Amphibotettix; Hancock, 1906

Synonyms
- Amphybotettix Steinmann, 1970

Genus of grasshoppers

External image
- Images at iNaturalist

Amphibotettix is an Asian genus of ground-hoppers (Orthoptera: Caelifera) in the subfamily Scelimeninae and the tribe Scelimenini; species have been recorded from Indochina and West Malesia.

== Species ==
Amphibotettix includes the species:

1. Amphibotettix abbotti (Rehn, 1904)
2. Amphibotettix hafizhaii (Mahmood, Idris & Salmah, 2007)
3. Amphibotettix longipes Hancock, 1906 - type species
