= Arulenus miae =

Scientific classification
- Kingdom: Animalia
- Phylum: Arthropoda
- Class: Insecta
- Order: Orthoptera
- Suborder: Caelifera
- Family: Tetrigidae
- Genus: Arulenus
- Species: A. miae

Binomial name
- Arulenus miae Skejo & Caballero, 2016

Species of grasshopper

Arulenus miae is a species of pygmy grasshopper which is found on the island Mindanao in the Philippines. It was described in 2016 by Josip Skejo and Joy Honezza S. Caballero. They became aware of the species' existence through a photograph posted to a Facebook group. Specimens were later collected from Bukidnon Province. It is named in honor of a friend of Skejo, named Mia.

Skejo and Caballero were praised for going through the process of collecting specimens instead of writing their description and naming a new taxon only based on a photograph.

== See also ==
- Eulophophyllum kirki Ingrisch & Riede, 2016 — a katydid described from a photograph posted on Flickr.
