= Tegotettix =

Scientific classification
- Kingdom: Animalia
- Phylum: Arthropoda
- Clade: Pancrustacea
- Class: Insecta
- Order: Orthoptera
- Suborder: Caelifera
- Family: Tetrigidae
- Subfamily: Scelimeninae
- Tribe: Discotettigini
- Genus: Tegotettix; Hancock, 1913

Genus of Caelifera

External image
- Images at iNaturalist

Tegotettix is a genus of Asian groundhoppers (Orthoptera: Caelifera) in the tribe Discotettigini, erected by Joseph Hancock in 1898. Species have been recorded from Indochina, Malesia East of Borneo through to New Guinea.

== Species ==
The Orthoptera Species File lists:

1. Tegotettix armatus Hancock, 1913 – type species (by original designation)
2. Tegotettix bufocrocodil (Storozhenko & Dawwrueng, 2015)
3. Tegotettix celebensis Günther, 1937
4. Tegotettix siebersi Günther, 1938
5. Tegotettix tuberculatus (Bolívar, 1887)
