= Bidentatettix =

Scientific classification
- Domain: Eukaryota
- Kingdom: Animalia
- Phylum: Arthropoda
- Class: Insecta
- Order: Orthoptera
- Suborder: Caelifera
- Family: Tetrigidae
- Subfamily: Scelimeninae
- Tribe: Discotettigini
- Genus: Bidentatettix; Zheng, 1992

Genus of grasshoppers

Bidentatettix is an Asian genus of ground-hoppers (Orthoptera: Caelifera) in the subfamily Scelimeninae and the tribe Discotettigini.

== Species ==
Bidentatettix includes the two species:

- Bidentatettix gorochovi (Podgornaya, 1992)
- Bidentatettix yunnanensis Zheng, 1992 - type species
