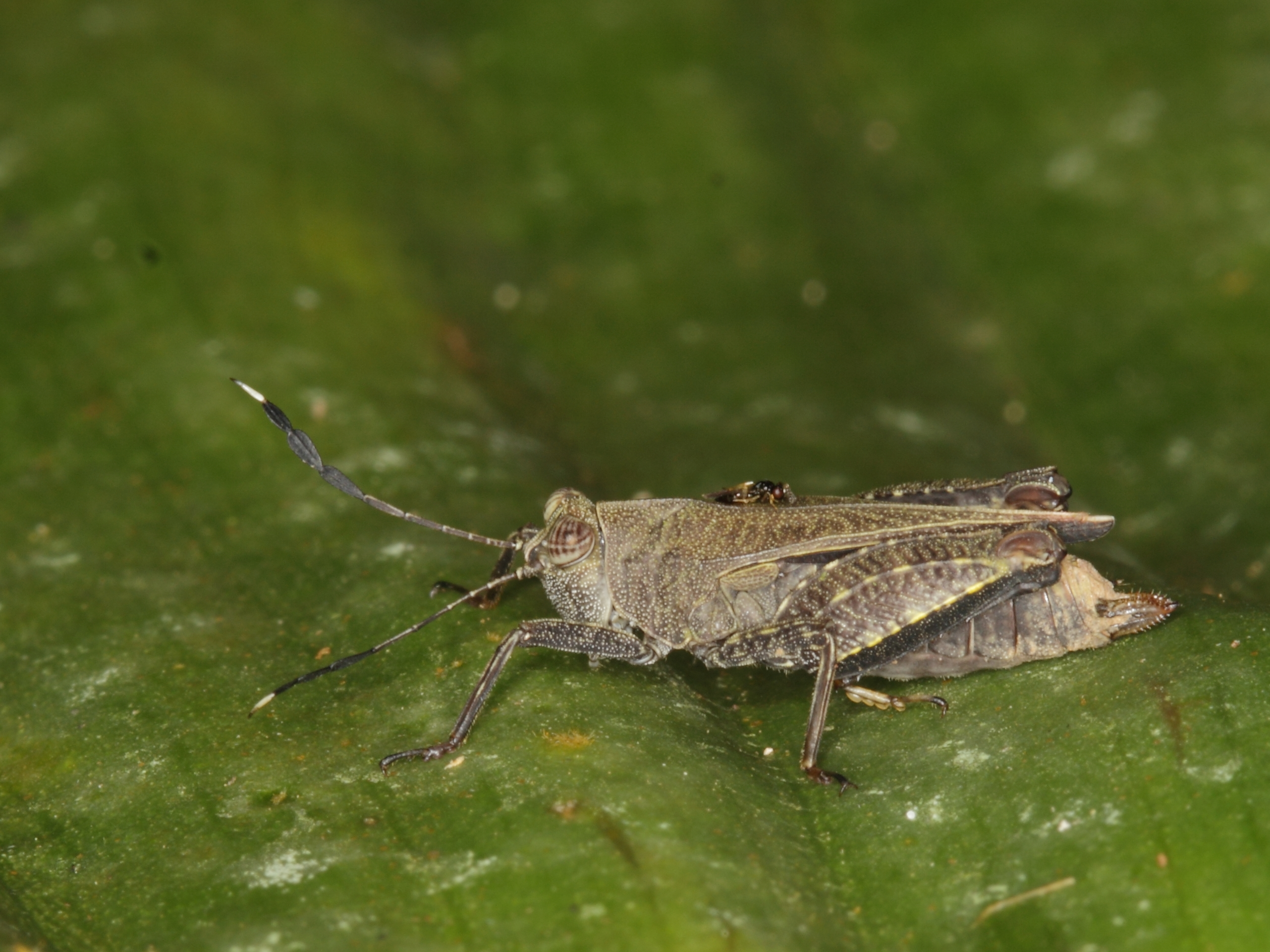
- P. insularis (with parasitoid)

Scientific classification
- Kingdom: Animalia
- Phylum: Arthropoda
- Class: Insecta
- Order: Orthoptera
- Suborder: Caelifera
- Family: Tetrigidae
- Tribe: Xistrellini
- Genus: Phaesticus; Uvarov, 1940

Synonyms
- Lamprauges Blackith, 1992; Flatocerus Liang & Zheng, 1984; Phaestus Bolívar, 1887

= Phaesticus =

Genus of grasshoppers

Phaesticus is a genus of Asian groundhoppers (Orthoptera: Tetrigidae), erected by Boris Uvarov in 1940 and now placed in the new (2025) tribe Xistrellini. Species are found in sourhern China (including Hainan), Indochina and Malesia.

== Species ==
The Orthoptera Species File lists:

1. Phaesticus hainanensis Liang, 1988
2. Phaesticus mellerborgi (Stål, 1855) - type species (as Tettix mellerborgi Stål). Synonyms include: Phaesticus azemii Mahmood, Idris & Salmah, 2007; P. carinatus Zheng, 1998; P. insularis (Hancock, 1907); P. sumatrensis (Willemse, 1928); P. uvarovi Storozhenko & Dawwrueng, 2015; type locality Java.
3. Phaesticus moniliantennatus (Günther, 1940) - China, Vietnam
