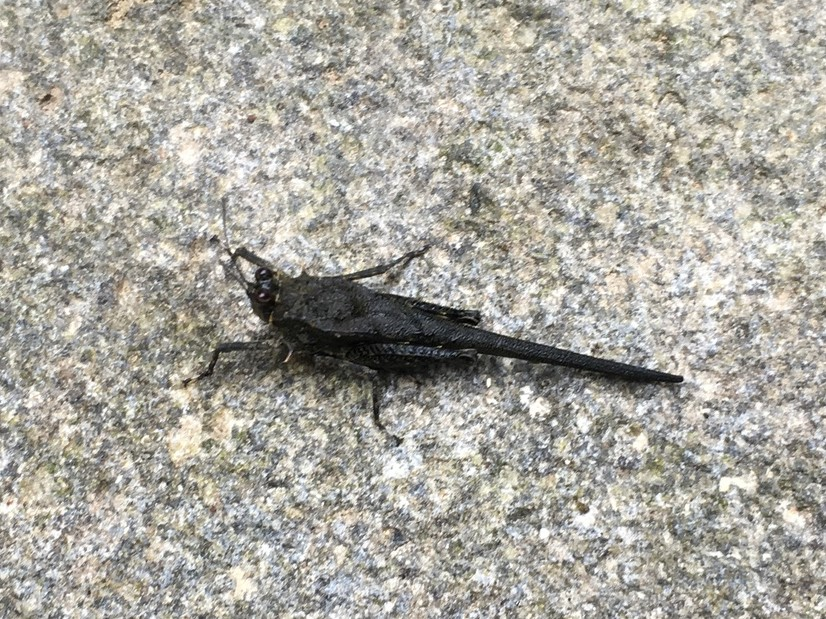
- Scelimena producta

Scientific classification
- Kingdom: Animalia
- Phylum: Arthropoda
- Class: Insecta
- Order: Orthoptera
- Suborder: Caelifera
- Family: Tetrigidae
- Tribe: Scelimenini
- Genus: Scelimena; Serville, 1838

Species
- See text

Synonyms
- Eugavialidium Hancock, 1907; Eufalconoides Zheng, Li & Shi, 2003; Hexocera Hancock, 1915; Paracriotettix Liang, 2002; Scelhymena Bolívar, 1902; Scelymena Saussure, 1862

= Scelimena =

Genus of Caelifera

Scelimena is a type genus of ground hoppers in the subfamily Scelimeninae, with records from India, Indo-China, Malesia and Papua New Guinea.

== Species ==
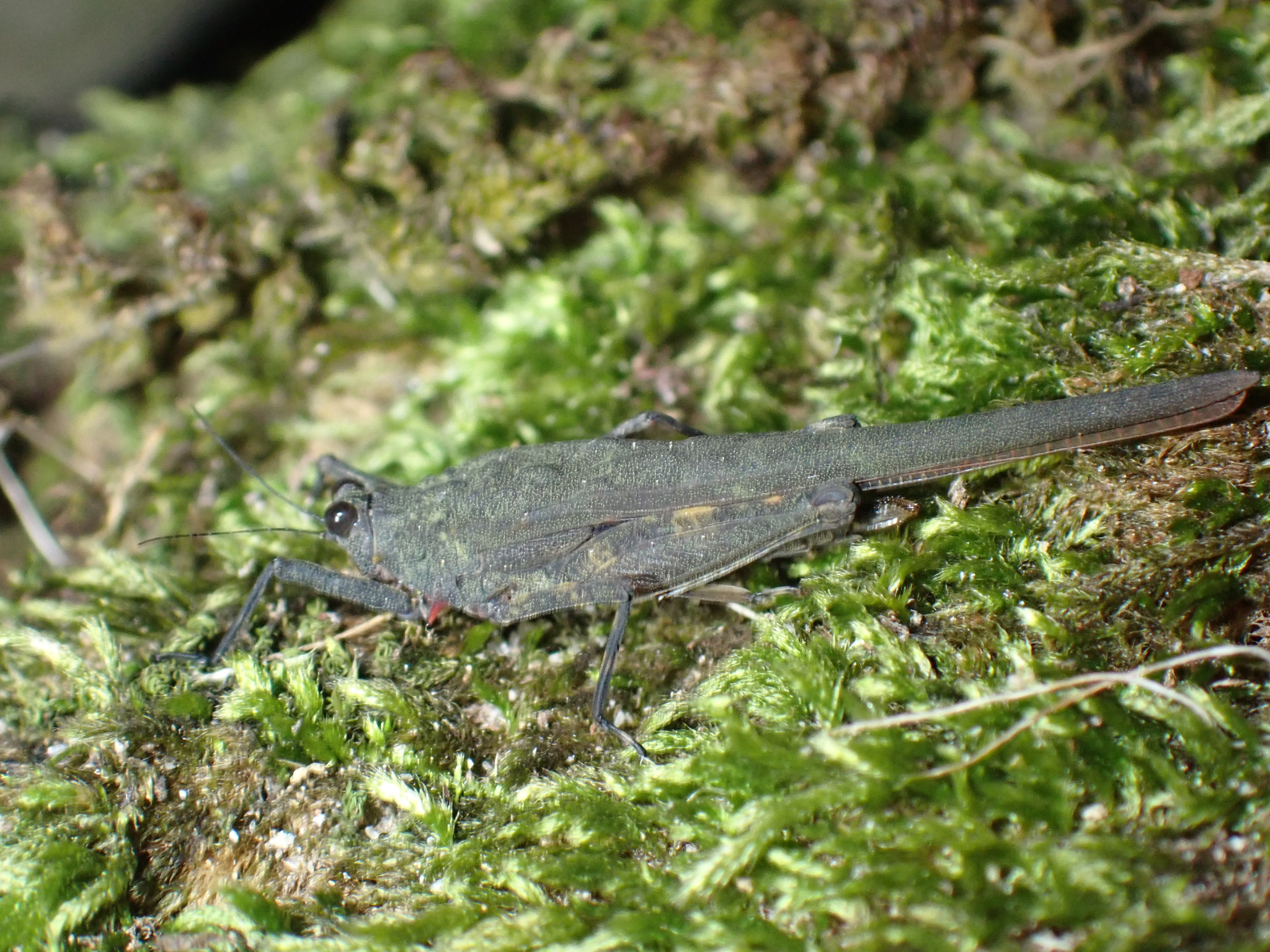
Scelimena bellula

The Orthoptera Species File lists:

- Scelimena bellula species group
  - Scelimena bellula Storozhenko & Dawwrueng, 2015
  - Scelimena guangxiensis Zheng & Jiang, 1994
  - Scelimena melli Günther, 1938
  - Scelimena nitidogranulosa Günther, 1938
  - Scelimena rosacea (Hancock, 1915)
- Scelimena discalis species group
  - Scelimena boettcheri Günther, 1938
  - Scelimena discalis (Hancock, 1915)
  - Scelimena gombakensis Muhammad, Tan & Skejo, 2018
  - Scelimena kempi (Hancock, 1915)
  - Scelimena songkrana Zha & Wen, 2017
- Scelimena hexodon - species group
  - Scelimena hexodon (Haan, 1843)
  - Scelimena marta Skejo & Tan, 2018
- Scelimena novaeguineae species group
  - Scelimena eremita (Günther, 1938)
  - Scelimena floresana Günther, 1955
  - Scelimena novaeguineae (Bolívar, 1898)
- Scelimena producta species group
  - Scelimena celebica (Bolívar, 1887)
  - Scelimena chinensis (Hancock, 1915)
  - Scelimena dammermanni Günther, 1938
  - Scelimena dentiumeris (Hancock, 1907)
  - Scelimena producta (Serville, 1838) - type species
  - Scelimena pyrroma Lao, Kasalo, Gao, Deng & Skejo, 2022
- Scelimena spiculata (Stål, 1877)
- Scelimena spicupennis Zheng & Ou, 2003
