= Albert John Hesse =

South African entomologist (1895–1987)

- Born: 4 November 1895; Potchefstroom, South African Republic
- Died: 11 November 1987 (aged 92); Somerset West
- Education: University of Cape Town; Transvaal University College
- Alma mater: University of Edinburgh
- Known for: Entomology of Bombyliidae and Mydidae
- Spouse: Elizabeth Susanna Hanekom (m.4 October 1927)
- Scientific career
- Fields: Entomology and Parasitology

Albert John Hesse (1895–1987) was a South African entomologist.

He was a curator at the Iziko South African Museum for fifty one years. Hesse worked primarily on Bombyliidae and Mydidae. He wrote the monumental A revision of the Bombyliidae (Diptera) of Southern Africa. Annals of the South African Museum 34:1-1053 (1938)

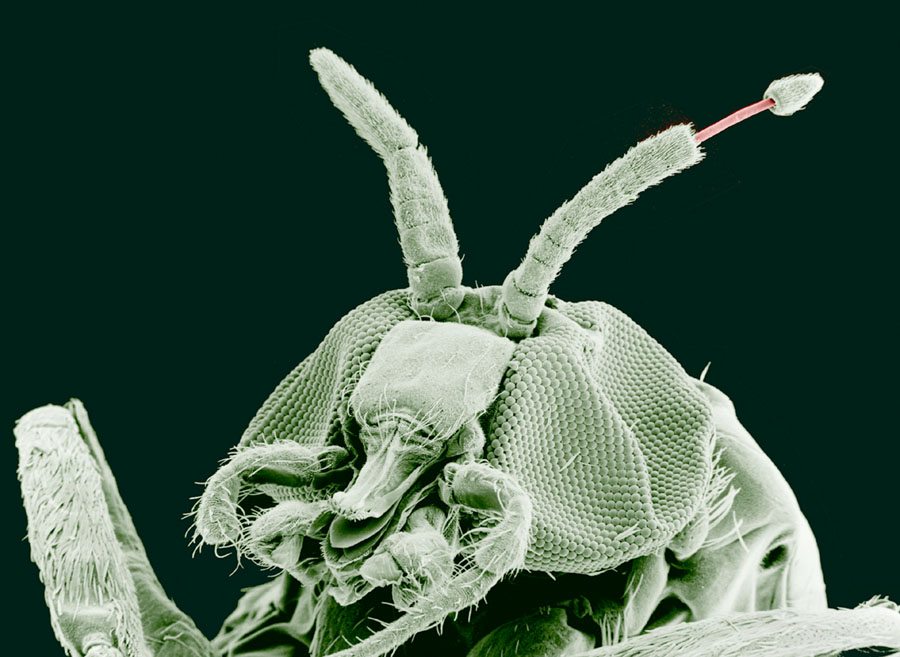
Parasite Onchocerca volvulus emerging from the antenna of a black fly

== Life and career ==
Hesse was born on 4 November 1895 in Potchefstroom, South African Republic where he attended school from 1904 to 1909. He attended high school in Wellington (1909–1913), went to the South African College Schools in Cape Town (1914) and matriculated from Boys' High School in Stellenbosch in 1915.

He started his university education at the South African College in Cape Town in 1916 but moved to the Transvaal University College in Pretoria in 1917 where he majored in Chemistry, Zoology and Geology. He obtained a BSc.Hons degree in 1918 and completed his PhD in Zoology and Parasitology at the University of Edinburgh in 1922.

He conducted post-doctoral research in Parasitology until 1924 when he accepted the post of entomologist at the South African Museum. During his period of service at the museum he went on frequent field trips to South West Africa, the Western and Eastern Cape and the Karoo.

On 4 October 1927 he married Elizabeth Susanna Hanekom in Cape Town.

He retired in 1974 after 51 years of service at the South African Museum. He died in Somerset West on 11 November 1987.
