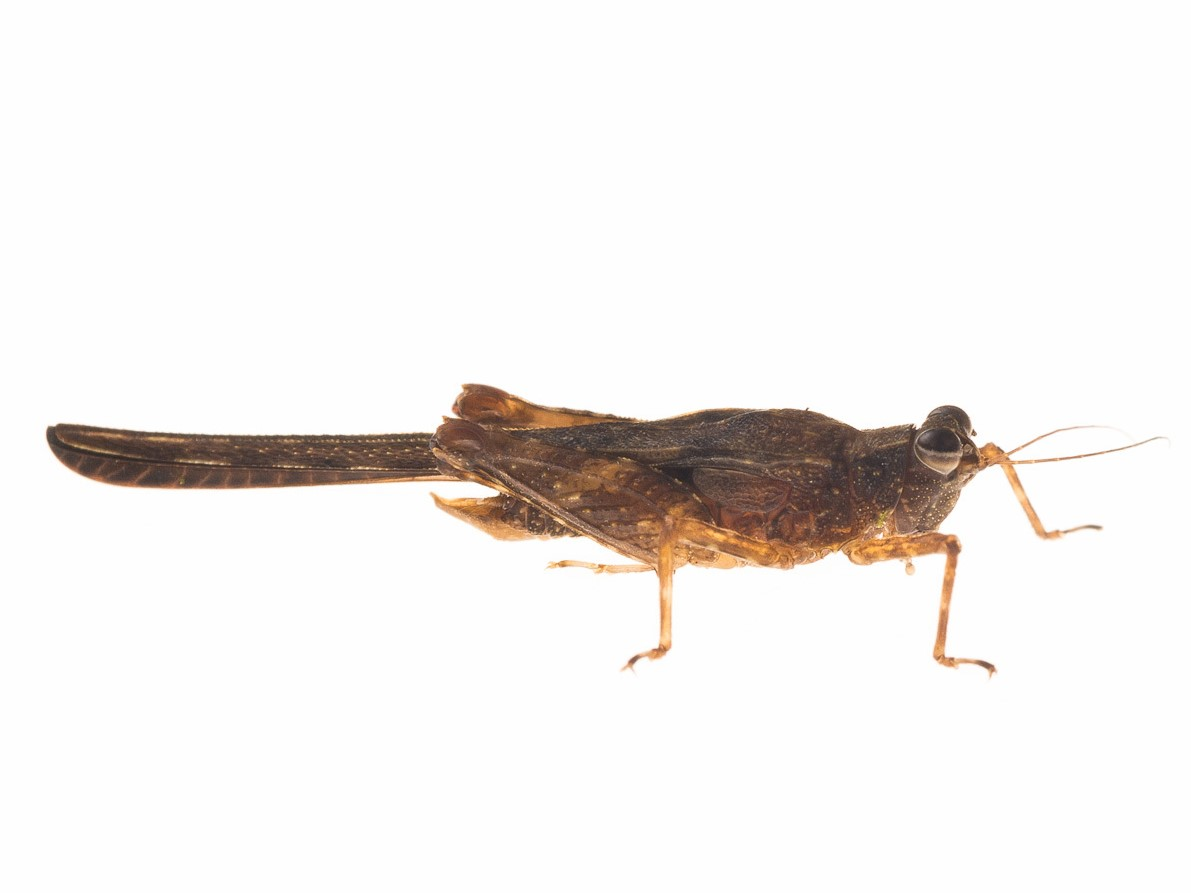
- Male

Scientific classification
- Domain: Eukaryota
- Kingdom: Animalia
- Phylum: Arthropoda
- Class: Insecta
- Order: Orthoptera
- Suborder: Caelifera
- Family: Tetrigidae
- Tribe: Scelimenini
- Genus: Falconius
- Species: F. dubius

Binomial name
- Falconius dubius Günther, 1938

Synonyms
- Scelimena razalii Mahmood, Idris & Salmah, 2007

= Falconius dubius =

Species of grasshopper

Falconius dubius is a species of groundhopper in the family Tetrigidae. It is found in Malaysia.
