= Discotettix selysi =

Scientific classification
- Domain: Eukaryota
- Kingdom: Animalia
- Phylum: Arthropoda
- Class: Insecta
- Order: Orthoptera
- Suborder: Caelifera
- Family: Tetrigidae
- Subfamily: Scelimeninae
- Tribe: Discotettigini
- Genus: Discotettix
- Species: D. selysi

Binomial name
- Discotettix selysi Bolívar, 1887

Synonyms
- Discotettix selangori Mahmood, Idris & Salmah, 2007

Species of Caelifera

Discotettix selysi is a groundhopper species found in Malaysia, belonging to the tribe Discotettigini, originally described by Ignacio Bolívar in 1887; it is a synonym is D. selangori.
