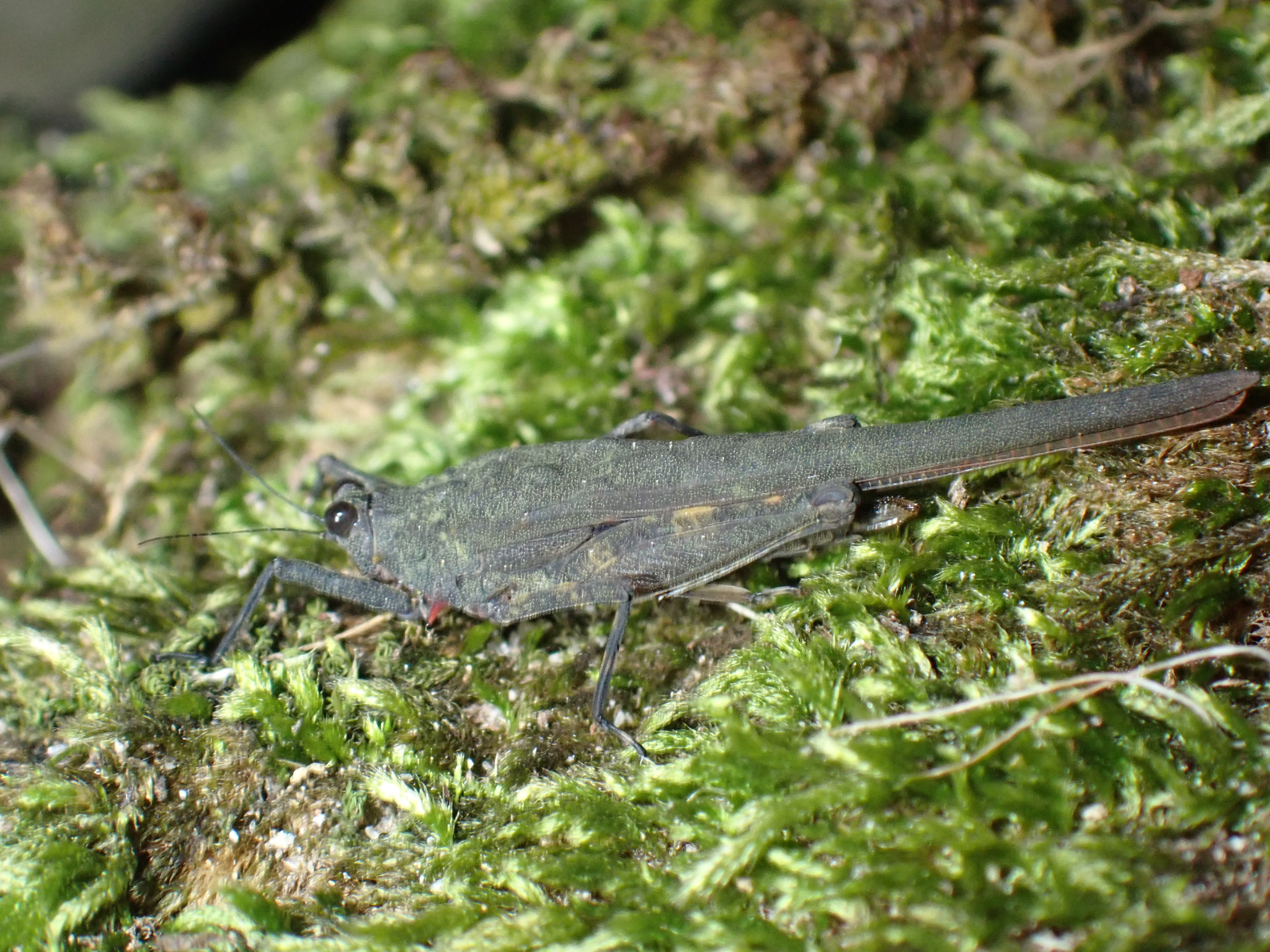
- Scelimena bellula

Scientific classification
- Kingdom: Animalia
- Phylum: Arthropoda
- Class: Insecta
- Order: Orthoptera
- Suborder: Caelifera
- Family: Tetrigidae
- Subfamily: Scelimeninae; Bolívar, 1887

Tribes
- See text

Synonyms
- Discotettigidae Hancock, 1907; Discotettiginae Hancock, 1907; Discotettinae Hancock, 1907; Scelimenae Bolívar, 1887; Scelimenidae Bolívar, 1887; Discotettigiae Hancock, 1907

= Scelimeninae =

Subfamily of Caelifera

Scelimeninae is a subfamily of Asian ground hoppers (Orthoptera: Caelifera).

== Tribes and genera ==
The Orthoptera Species File lists two tribes:

=== Discotettigini ===
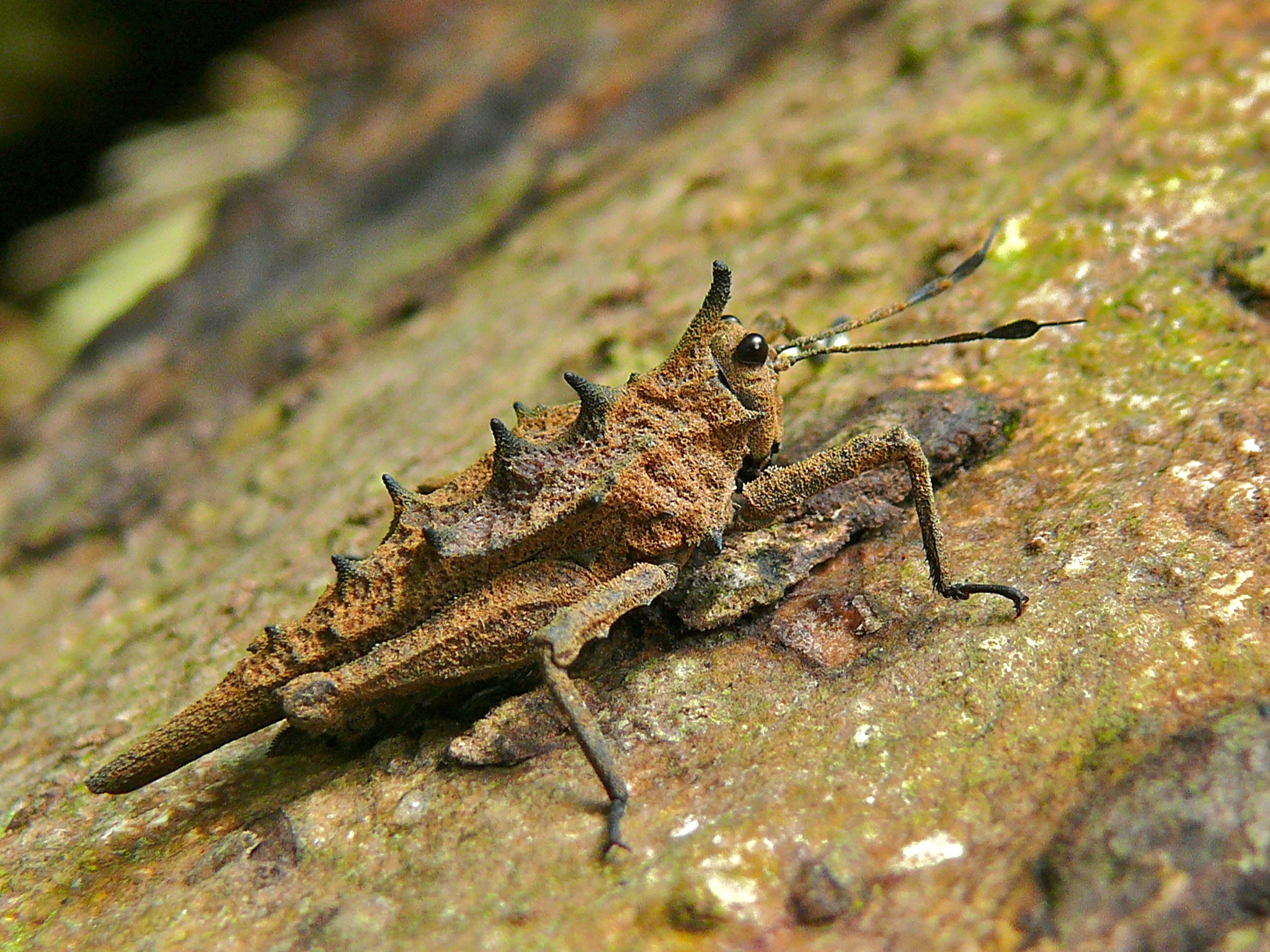
Discotettix belzebuth

Authority: Hancock, 1907

1. Austrohancockia Günther, 1938
2. Bidentatettix Zheng, 1992
3. Disconius Skejo, Pushkar & Tumbrinck, 2022 - monotypic: Borneo
4. Discotettix Costa, 1864
5. Eufalconius Günther, 1938
6. Gavialidium Saussure, 1862
7. Gibbotettix Zheng, 1992 - China
8. Kraengia Bolívar, 1909 - monotypic Kraengia apicalis Bolívar, 1909
9. Paragavialidium Zheng, 1994 - China
10. Tegotettix Hancock, 1913
11. Zvierckia Skejo, Tumbrinck & Pushkar, 2024 - Sulawesi

=== Scelimenini ===
Auth. Hancock, 1907

1. Amphibotettix Hancock, 1906
2. Euscelimena Günther, 1938
3. Falconius Bolívar, 1898
4. Indoscelimena Günther, 1938
5. Paramphibotettix Günther, 1938
6. Platygavialidium Günther, 1938
7. Scelimena Serville, 1838
8. Tagaloscelimena Günther, 1938
9. Tefrinda Bolívar, 1906

=== tribe unassigned ===
1. Arulenus Stål, 1877
2. Dengonius Adžić, Deranja, Franjević & Skejo, 2020
3. Hebarditettix Günther, 1938
4. Zhengitettix Liang, 1994
