= Amphibotettix hafizhaii =

Scientific classification
- Domain: Eukaryota
- Kingdom: Animalia
- Phylum: Arthropoda
- Class: Insecta
- Order: Orthoptera
- Suborder: Caelifera
- Family: Tetrigidae
- Genus: Amphibotettix
- Species: A. hafizhaii

Binomial name
- Amphibotettix hafizhaii (Mahmood, Idris & Salmah, 2007)

Synonyms
- Scelimena hafizhaii Mahmood, Idris & Salmah, 2007

Species of groundhopper

Amphibotettix hafizhaii is a species of groundhopper in the family Tetrigidae. It is found in Malaysia.
