= Epitettix parallelus =

Scientific classification
- Kingdom: Animalia
- Phylum: Arthropoda
- Class: Insecta
- Order: Orthoptera
- Suborder: Caelifera
- Family: Tetrigidae
- Subfamily: Cladonotinae
- Genus: Epitettix
- Species: E. parallelus

Binomial name
- Epitettix parallelus (Podgornaya, 1986)

Synonyms
- Vaotettix parallelus Podgornaya, 1986

Species of ground-hoppers

Epitettix parallelus is a species of ground-hoppers (Orthoptera: Caelifera), from Vietnam and not assigned to any tribe.

This was previously considered a species in the monotypic genus Vaotettix Podgornaya, 1986, in the subfamily Metrodorinae, then V. parallelus was moved to Epitettix in 2021.
