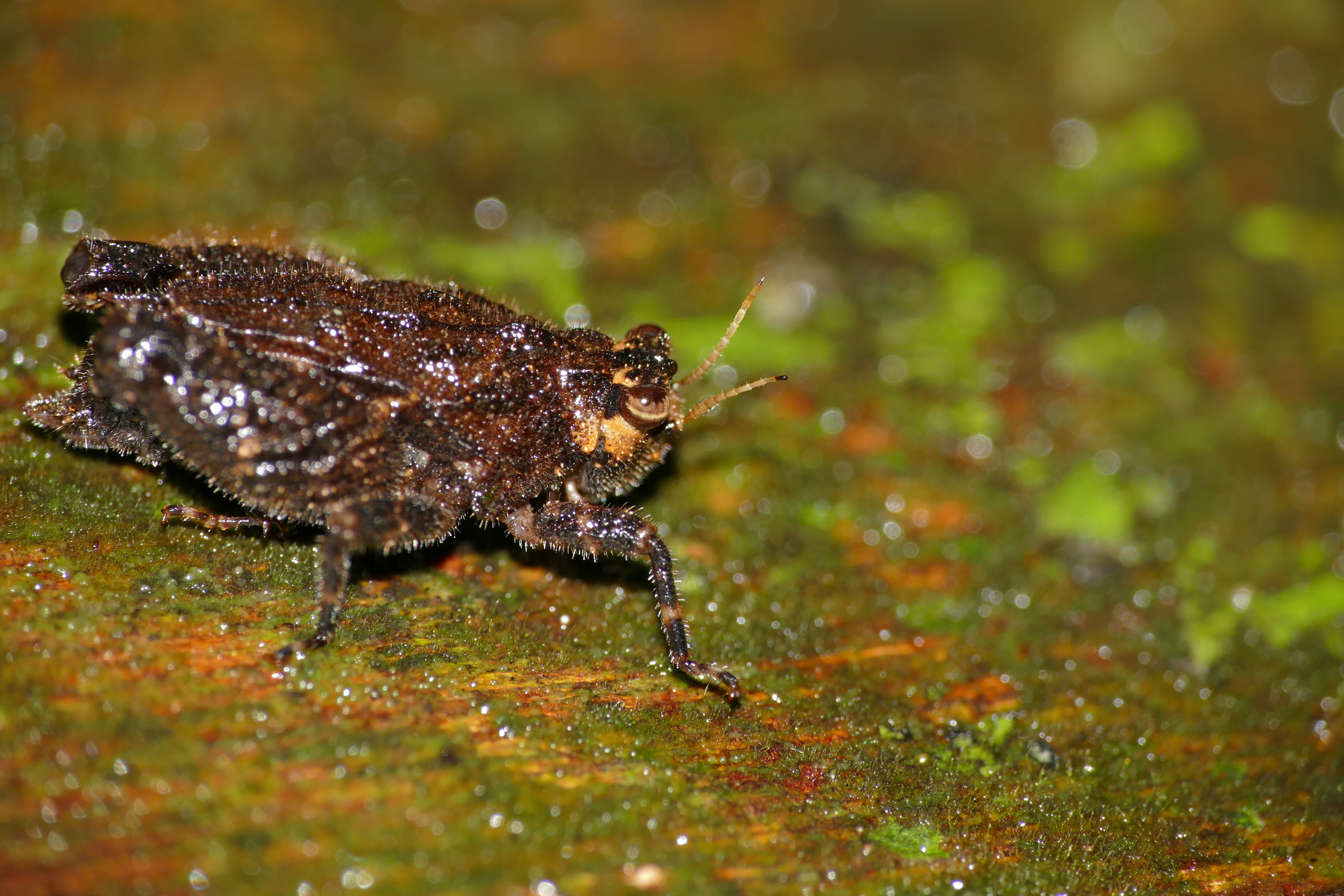
- Potua morbillosa, Borneo

Scientific classification
- Kingdom: Animalia
- Phylum: Arthropoda
- Class: Insecta
- Order: Orthoptera
- Suborder: Caelifera
- Family: Tetrigidae
- Tribe: Xerophyllini
- Genus: Potua; Bolívar, 1887

= Potua =

Genus of insects

Potua is a genus of Asian groundhoppers in the subfamily Cladonotinae and tribe Xerophyllini, erected by Bolívar in 1887; distribution records are discontinuous between India and western Malesia.

== Species ==
The Orthoptera Species File lists:

1. Potua coronata Bolívar, 1887 - type species (2 subspecies)
2. Potua morbillosa (Walker, 1871)
3. Potua sabulosa Hancock, 1915

Note: Potua aptera is a synonym of Deltonotus gibbiceps (Bolívar, 1902)
