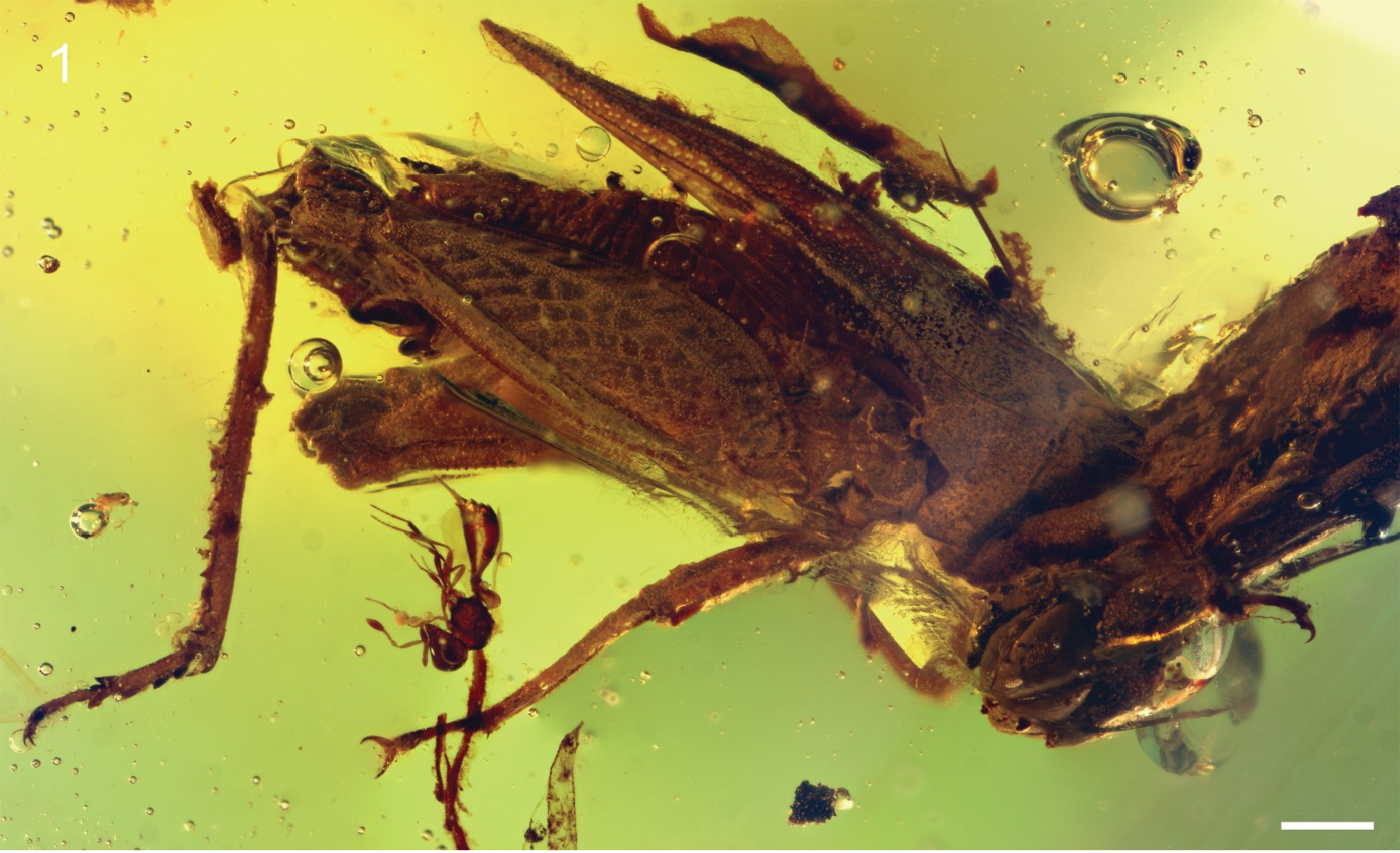
- E. attenboroughi encased in amber

Scientific classification
- Kingdom: Animalia
- Phylum: Arthropoda
- Clade: Pancrustacea
- Class: Insecta
- Order: Orthoptera
- Suborder: Caelifera
- Family: Tetrigidae
- Subfamily: Metrodorinae
- Tribe: Metrodorini
- Genus: †Electrotettix; Heads & Thomas, 2014
- Species: †E. attenboroughi

Binomial name
- †Electrotettix attenboroughi Heads & Thomas, 2014

= Electrotettix =

Electrotettix Temporal range: 20–18 Ma Burdigalian

Extinct genus of grasshoppers

Electrotettix is an extinct genus of pygmy locust found in amber collected in the Dominican Republic. Represented by a single species, Electrotettix attenboroughi, which lived 18-20 million years ago, it fed primarily on moss, fungi, and algae. The genus name is derived from electrum, Latin for "amber", and Greek tettix, meaning "grasshopper". The species was named after Sir David Attenborough. The female measures 8 millimeters in length: the male is unknown. The species is distinguished from modern members of the Cladonotinae subfamily by the fact that it retains vestigial wings, a feature lost somewhere between the ancient specimens and more modern species. E. attenboroughi was identified from a collection of amber at the Illinois Natural History Survey, which had been stored in a cabinet under a sink since it was collected in the 1950s by entomologist Milton Sanderson.

== See also ==
- List of things named after David Attenborough and his works
