= Macromotettix =

Scientific classification
- Domain: Eukaryota
- Kingdom: Animalia
- Phylum: Arthropoda
- Class: Insecta
- Order: Orthoptera
- Suborder: Caelifera
- Superfamily: Tetrigoidea
- Family: Tetrigidae
- Subfamily: Metrodorinae
- Genus: Macromotettix; Günther, 1939

Synonyms
- Mactomotettix Deng, Zheng & Zhan, 2010

Genus of grasshoppers

Macromotettix is an Asian genus of ground-hoppers (Orthoptera: Caelifera) in the subfamily Metrodorinae and not assigned to any tribe.

== Species ==
Macromotettix includes the species:

- Macromotettix brachynotus Zheng, 1998
- Macromotettix compactus Chopard, 1929
- Macromotettix convexa Deng, Zheng & Zhan, 2010
- Macromotettix guangxiensis Deng, Zheng & Wei, 2007
- Macromotettix longipennis Zheng, 1998
- Macromotettix longtanensis Zheng & Jiang, 2003
- Macromotettix luoxiaoshanensis Zheng & Fu, 2000
- Macromotettix nigritibis Zheng & Fu, 2005
- Macromotettix nigritubercula Zheng & Jiang, 2006
- Macromotettix qinlingensis Zheng, Wei & Li, 2009
- Macromotettix quadricarinatus Bolívar, 1898 - type species (as Mazarredia quadricarinata Bolívar I)
- Macromotettix serrifemoralis Zheng & Jiang, 2002
- Macromotettix sokutsuensis Karny, 1915
- Macromotettix solomonensis Günther, 1972
- Macromotettix tianlinensis Liang & Jiang, 2004
- Macromotettix tonkinensis Günther, 1939
- Macromotettix torulisinota Zheng, 1998
- Macromotettix wangxiangtaiensis Zheng & Ou, 2010
- Macromotettix wuliangshana Zheng & Ou, 2003
- Macromotettix xinganensis Zheng, Zhang & Dang, 2009
- Macromotettix yaoshanensis Zheng & Jiang, 2000
