= Xerophyllum =

Xerophyllum is the name of two genera:

- Xerophyllum (plant) a genus of Melanthiaceae
- Xerophyllum (insect) a genus of insects
