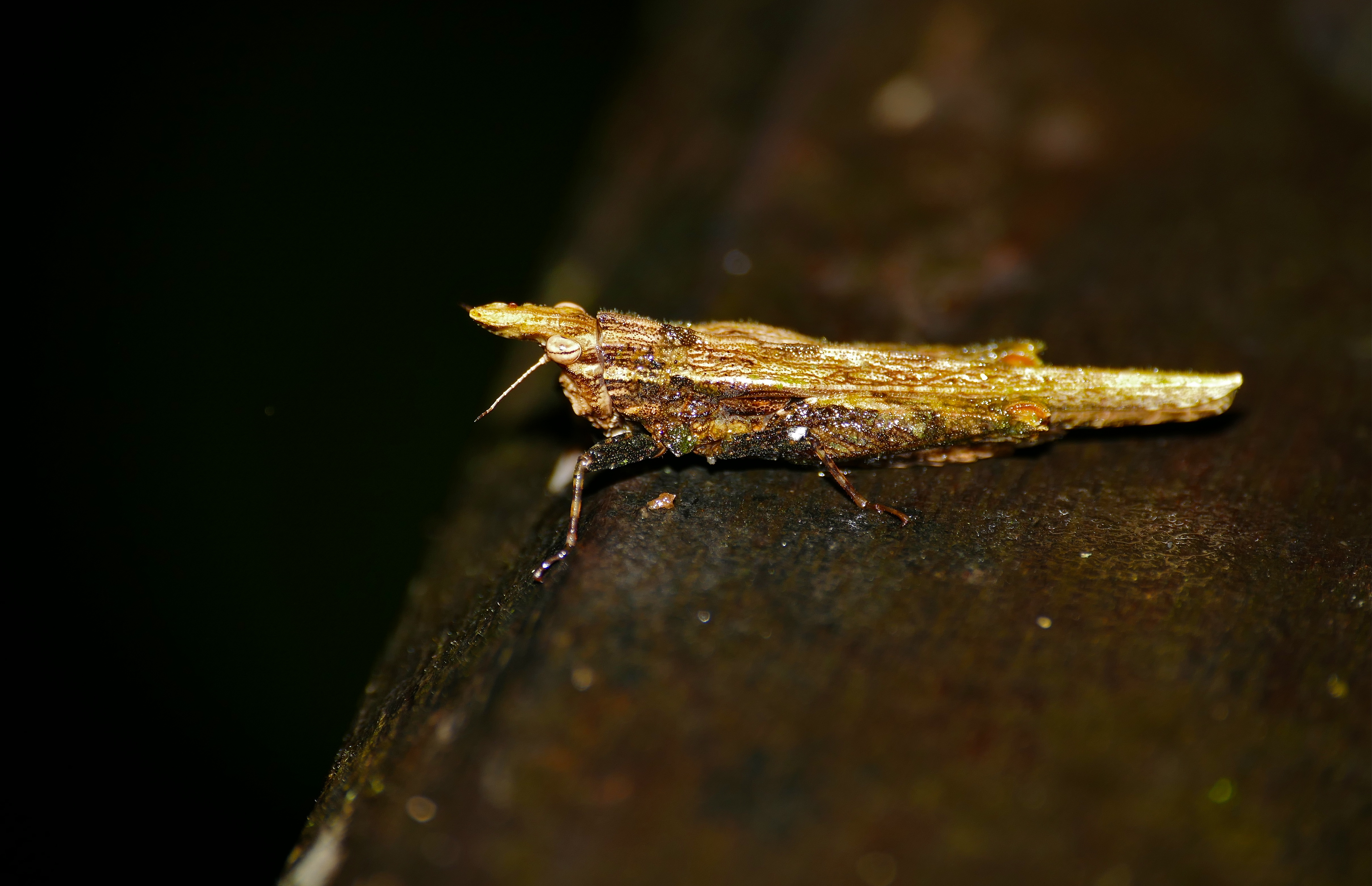
- Rostella phyllocera (Borneo)

Scientific classification
- Kingdom: Animalia
- Phylum: Arthropoda
- Class: Insecta
- Order: Orthoptera
- Suborder: Caelifera
- Infraorder: Acrididea
- Superfamily: Tetrigoidea
- Family: Tetrigidae
- Subfamily: Metrodorinae; Bolívar, 1887

Tribes
- Amorphopini Günther, 1939; Cleostratini Bolívar, 1887; Clinophaestini Storozhenko, 2013; Metrodorini Bolívar, 1887; Ophiotettigini Tumbrinck & Skejo, 2017

Synonyms
- Amorphopinae Günther, 1939; Metrodorae Bolívar, 1887; Metrodoridae Bolívar, 1887; Metrodorini Bolívar, 1887

= Metrodorinae =

Subfamily of grasshoppers

Metrodorinae is a subfamily of groundhoppers or pygmy grasshoppers. There are more than 590 described species, found in South America, Africa and Asia. In a 2025 revision, new tribes were erected and a number of genera were placed in the subfamily Guntheritettiginae.

== Genera ==
The Orthoptera Species File currently (July 2025) lists nine tribes:

Amorphopini Günther, 1939

distribution: S. America

1. Amorphopus Serville, 1838
2. Eomorphopus Hancock, 1900

=== Cleostratini ===
Authority: Bolívar, 1887; distribution: mostly SE Asia, W Africa, Madagascar

1. Cleostratus Stål, 1877 - Philippines
2. Dravidacris Bhaskar & Kasalo, 2022 - S. India
3. Procytettix Bolívar, 1912 - Madagascar
4. Pseudomitraria Hancock, 1907 - W. Africa
5. Rhynchotettix Hancock, 1907 - Madagascar

=== Clinophaestini ===
Authority: Storozhenko, 2013; distribution: western Indochina, Pacific islands

1. Birmana Brunner von Wattenwyl, 1893
2. Clinophaestus Storozhenko, 2013
3. Thyrsus - monotypic Thyrsus tiaratus Bolívar, 1887

Garciaitettigini Cadena-Castañeda, 2025

1. Chiriquia Morse, 1900
2. Devrieseium Cadena-Castañeda & Tavares, 2025
3. Garciaitettix Cadena-Castañeda & Tavares, 2025
4. Stalitettix Cadena-Castañeda & Tavares, 2025
5. Trigonofemora Hancock, 1906

Metopomystrini Cadena-Castañeda, 2025

1. Metopomystrum Günther, 1939 - S. America

=== Metrodorini ===
Authority: Bolívar, 1887; distribution South America;
Note: two tribes previously in the Cladonotinae, Miriatrini Cadena-Castañeda & Cardona, 2015 and Mucrotettigini Cadena-Castañeda & Silva, 2019, are now placed here as subtribes together with the Metrodorina Bolívar, 1887.

1. Antillotettix Perez-Gelabert, 2003
2. Armasius Perez-Gelabert & Yong, 2014
3. †Baeotettix Heads, 2009
4. Bahorucotettix Perez-Gelabert, Hierro & Otte, 1998
5. Cota Bolívar, 1887
6. Cubanotettix Perez-Gelabert, Hierro & Otte, 1998
7. Cubonotus Perez-Gelabert, Hierro & Otte, 1998
8. †Electrotettix Heads & Thomas, 2014
9. Haitianotettix Perez-Gelabert, Hierro & Otte, 1998
10. Hancockiella Cadena-Castañeda & Cardona, 2015
11. Hottettix Perez-Gelabert, Hierro & Otte, 1998
12. Metrodora Bolívar, 1887
13. Miriatra Bolívar, 1906
14. Mucrotettix Perez-Gelabert, Hierro & Otte, 1998
15. Sierratettix Perez-Gelabert, Hierro & Otte, 1998
16. Tiburonotus Perez-Gelabert, Hierro & Otte, 1998
17. Truncotettix Perez-Gelabert, Hierro & Otte, 1998

=== Ophiotettigini ===
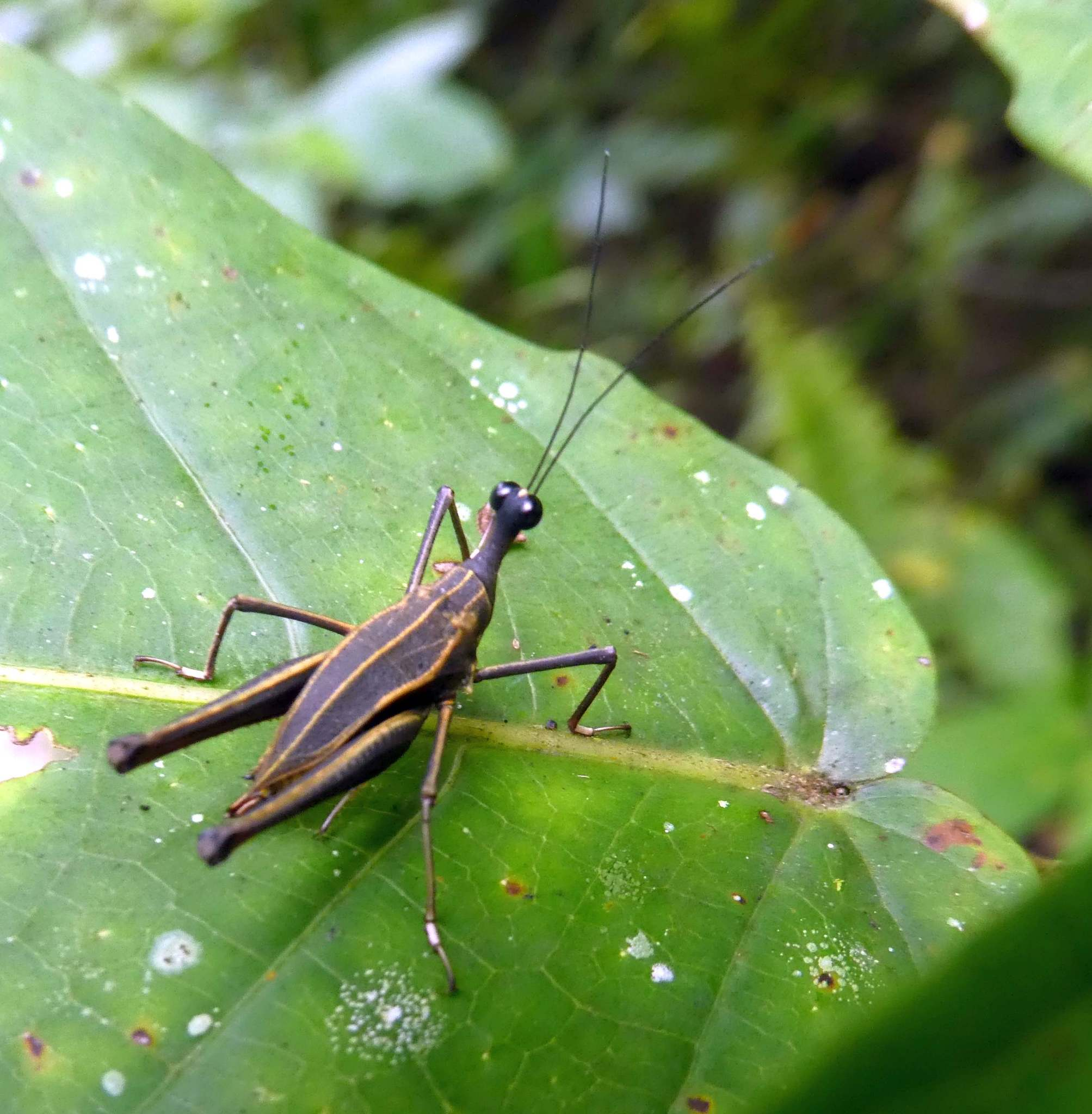
Ophiotettix mountnokensis

Authority: Tumbrinck & Skejo, 2017; distribution: SE Asia

1. Halmahera Storozhenko, 2016 - Maluku Islands
2. Ophiotettix Walker, 1871
3. Paraspartolus Günther, 1939 - Philippines
4. Rhopalotettix Hancock, 1910
5. Spartolus Stål, 1877 (synonym Threciscus Bolívar, 1887) - Philippines
6. Uvarovithyrsus Storozhenko, 2016 - Solomon Islands

Otumbini

Authority: Cadena-Castañeda, 2025; distribution: South America

1. Bruneritettix Cadena-Castañeda & Tavares, 2025
2. Otumba Morse, 1900
3. Platythorus Morse, 1900
4. Plesiotettix Hancock, 1907

Pterotettigini

Authority: Cadena-Castañeda, 2025; distribution: Madagascar

1. Oxytettix Rehn, 1929
2. Pterotettix Bolívar, 1887
3. Tetticerus Hancock, 1900

=== Tribe Unassigned ===
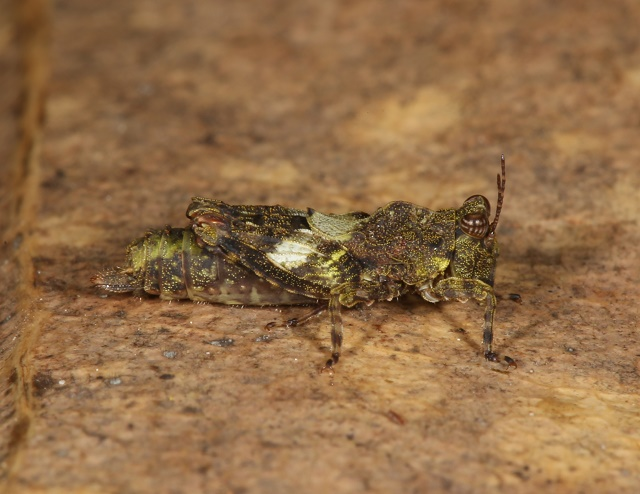
Amphinotus nymphula

1. Amphinotus Hancock, 1915
2. Arexion Rehn, 1929
3. Austrohyboella Rehn, 1952
4. Bermania Storozhenko, 2012
5. Bullaetettix Günther, 1937
6. Calyptraeus Wang, 2001
7. Camelotettix Hancock, 1907
8. Centrosotettix Günther, 1939
9. Cingalina Hebard, 1932
10. Cingalotettix Günther, 1939
11. Cleostratoides Storozhenko, 2013
12. Concavetettix Deng, 2021
13. Edentatettix Deng, 2025
14. Gorochovitettix Storozhenko & Pushkar, 2015
15. Guentheracris Skejo, Tumbrinck & Pushkar, 2024
16. Hirrius Bolívar, 1887
17. Isandrus Rehn, 1930
18. Macromotettix Günther, 1939
19. Macromotettixoides Zheng, Wei & Jiang, 2005
20. Mazarredia Bolívar, 1887
21. Melainotettix Günther, 1939
22. Mixohyboella Shishodia, 1991
23. Moluccasia Rehn, 1948
24. Orthotettix Hancock, 1909
25. Orthotettixoides Zheng, 1998
26. Paraguelus Günther, 1939
27. Paraphyllum Hancock, 1913
28. Peronotettix Rehn, 1952
29. Storozhenkoium Cadena-Castañeda & Tavares, 2025
30. Timoritettix Günther, 1971
31. Xistrellula Günther, 1939
