= Nesotettix =

Scientific classification
- Kingdom: Animalia
- Phylum: Arthropoda
- Class: Insecta
- Order: Orthoptera
- Suborder: Caelifera
- Family: Tetrigidae
- Genus: Nesotettix; Holdhaus, 1909

Genus of grasshoppers

Nesotettix is a genus of groundhoppers belonging to the subfamily Cladonotinae.

The species of this genus are found in Central America.

Species:

- Nesotettix cheesmanae K.Günther, 1938
- Nesotettix samoensis Holdhaus, 1909
