= Cota (insect) =

Scientific classification
- Kingdom: Animalia
- Phylum: Arthropoda
- Class: Insecta
- Order: Orthoptera
- Suborder: Caelifera
- Family: Tetrigidae
- Subfamily: Metrodorinae
- Tribe: Metrodorini
- Genus: Cota; Bolívar, 1887

Genus of grasshoppers

Cota is a genus of pygmy grasshoppers in the family Tetrigidae. There are five described species in Cota. (see also older)

== Species ==
These five species belong to the genus Cota:

- Cota bispina (Saussure, 1861)
- Cota caxiuana Cadena-Castañeda & Cardona, 2025
- Cota saxosa Bolívar, 1887
- Cota strumosa Bolívar, 1887
- Cota undulata (Cadena-Castañeda & Cardona, 2015)
