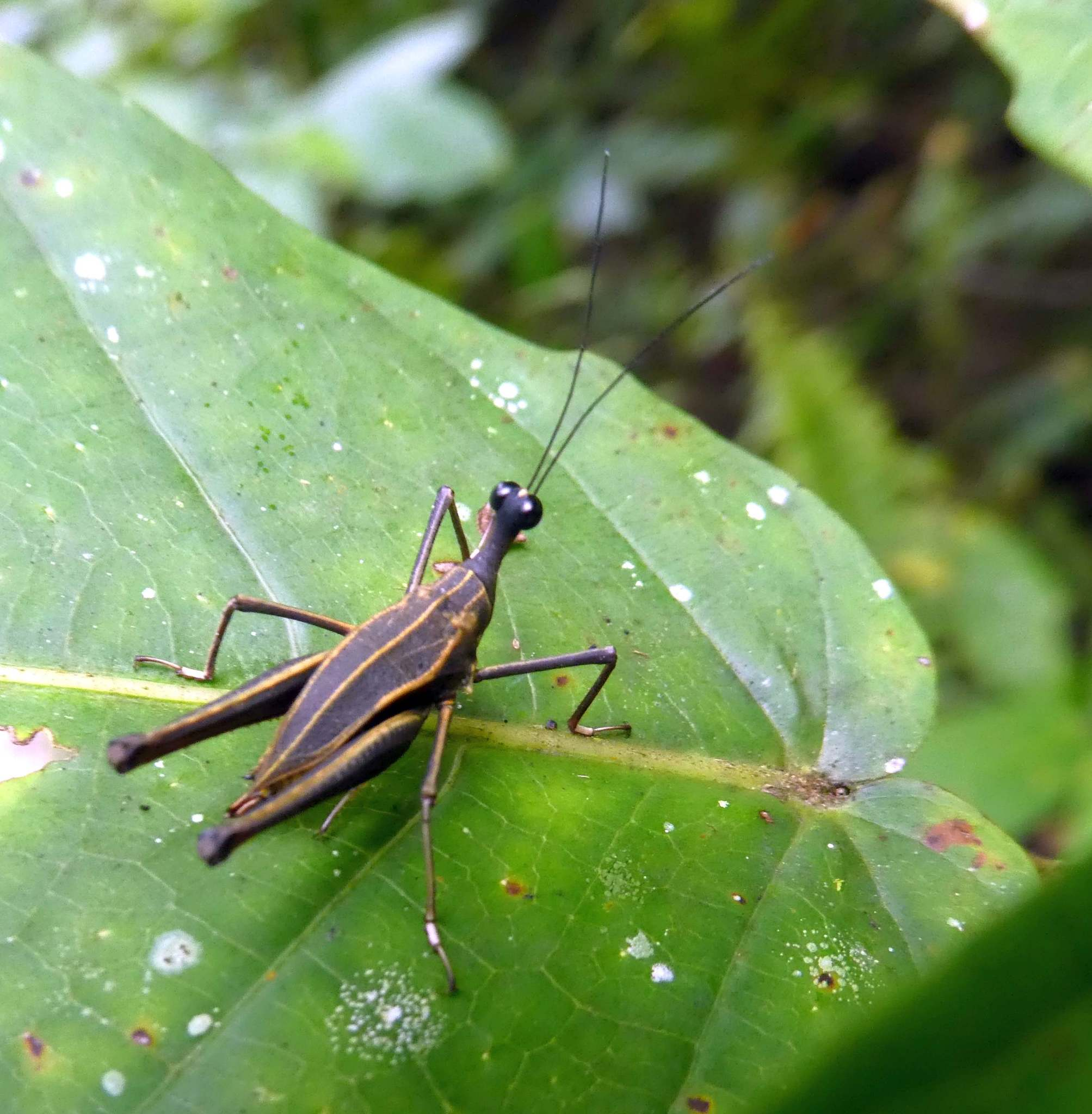
- Ophiotettix mountnokensis

Scientific classification
- Domain: Eukaryota
- Kingdom: Animalia
- Phylum: Arthropoda
- Class: Insecta
- Order: Orthoptera
- Suborder: Caelifera
- Family: Tetrigidae
- Subfamily: Metrodorinae
- Tribe: Ophiotettigini
- Genus: Ophiotettix; Walker, 1871

Synonyms
- Tetricodina Westwood, 1874; Tettigodina Bolívar, 1887

= Ophiotettix =

Genus of Caelifera

Ophiotettix is a genus of ground-hoppers (Orthoptera: Caelifera) in the subfamily Metrodorinae and since 2017 has become the type genus of tribe Ophiotettigini; it was erected by Francis Walker in 1871. The recorded distribution for species in this genus is from New Guinea and surrounding islands.

== Species ==
Twelve species groups or superspecies have been identified; the Orthoptera Species File lists:

species group brevicollis Tumbrinck & Skejo, 2017

1. Ophiotettix brevicollis Tumbrinck & Skejo, 2017
2. Ophiotettix parvicollis Tumbrinck & Skejo, 2017
3. Ophiotettix roesleri Tumbrinck & Skejo, 2017
4. Ophiotettix subbrevicollis Tumbrinck & Skejo, 2017

species group buergersi Tumbrinck & Skejo, 2017

1. Ophiotettix buergersi Bolívar, 1929
2. Ophiotettix imbiana Tumbrinck & Skejo, 2017
3. Ophiotettix modesta Bolívar, 1929
4. Ophiotettix rohwedderi Tumbrinck & Skejo, 2017
5. Ophiotettix sanguinea Tumbrinck & Skejo, 2017
6. Ophiotettix schapinae Tumbrinck & Skejo, 2017
7. Ophiotettix tenuis Tumbrinck & Skejo, 2017

species group cygnicollis Tumbrinck & Skejo, 2017

1. Ophiotettix amberiana Tumbrinck & Skejo, 2017
2. Ophiotettix cygnicollis Walker, 1871
  – type species
3. Ophiotettix pushkari Tumbrinck & Skejo, 2017
4. Ophiotettix storozhenkoi Tumbrinck & Skejo, 2017

species group hansscholteni Tumbrinck & Skejo, 2017

1. Ophiotettix hansscholteni Tumbrinck & Skejo, 2017

species group katharinae Tumbrinck & Skejo, 2017

1. Ophiotettix flyriveriensis Tumbrinck & Skejo, 2017
2. Ophiotettix kaitani Tumbrinck & Skejo, 2017
3. Ophiotettix karimuiensis Tumbrinck & Skejo, 2017
4. Ophiotettix katharinae Tumbrinck & Skejo, 2017
5. Ophiotettix quateorum Tumbrinck & Skejo, 2017

species group limosina (Snellen van Vollenhoven, 1865)

1. Ophiotettix bewana Tumbrinck & Skejo, 2017
2. Ophiotettix bomberaiensis Tumbrinck & Skejo, 2017
3. Ophiotettix depressa Tumbrinck & Skejo, 2017
4. Ophiotettix filiforma Tumbrinck & Skejo, 2017
5. Ophiotettix limosina (Snellen van Vollenhoven, 1865)
6. Ophiotettix luce Tumbrinck & Skejo, 2017
7. Ophiotettix mountnokensis Tumbrinck & Skejo, 2017
8. Ophiotettix projecta Tumbrinck & Skejo, 2017
9. Ophiotettix scolopax Bolívar, 1929

species group lorentzi Bolívar, 1929

1. Ophiotettix lorentzi Bolívar, 1929

species group pulcherrima Tumbrinck & Skejo, 2017

1. Ophiotettix pulcherrima Tumbrinck & Skejo, 2017
2. Ophiotettix rebrinae Tumbrinck & Skejo, 2017

species group stallei Tumbrinck & Skejo, 2017

1. Ophiotettix stallei Tumbrinck & Skejo, 2017

species group telefominensis Tumbrinck & Skejo, 2017

1. Ophiotettix telefominensis Tumbrinck & Skejo, 2017

species group toxopei Tumbrinck & Skejo, 2017

1. Ophiotettix toxopei Tumbrinck & Skejo, 2017

species group westwoodi Bolívar, 1929

1. Ophiotettix cheesmanae Tumbrinck & Skejo, 2017
2. Ophiotettix fritzpahli Tumbrinck & Skejo, 2017
3. Ophiotettix meggy Tumbrinck & Skejo, 2017
4. Ophiotettix westwoodi Bolívar, 1929
