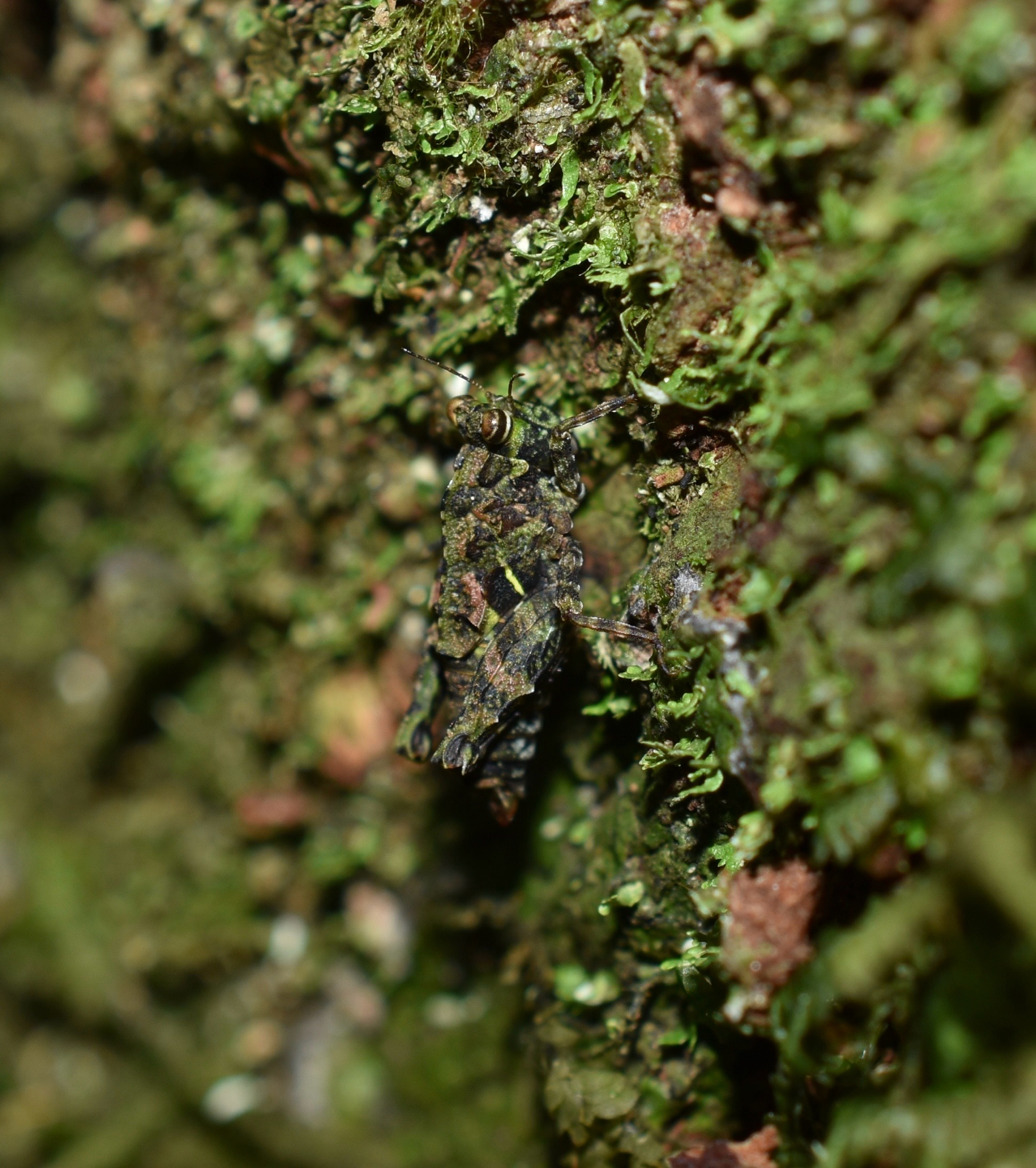
- Amphinotus pygmaeus in Galway's Land National Park, Nuwara Eliya

Scientific classification
- Kingdom: Animalia
- Phylum: Arthropoda
- Clade: Pancrustacea
- Class: Insecta
- Order: Orthoptera
- Suborder: Caelifera
- Family: Tetrigidae
- Genus: Amphinotus
- Species: A. pygmaeus

Binomial name
- Amphinotus pygmaeus Hancock, 1915

= Amphinotus pygmaeus =

Species of groundhopper

Amphinotus pygmaeus is a species of groundhopper found in Sri Lanka. It was described in 1915 by Joseph L. Hancock, and is the type species for the genus Amphinotus.
