= Metrodora (insect) =

Scientific classification
- Domain: Eukaryota
- Kingdom: Animalia
- Phylum: Arthropoda
- Class: Insecta
- Order: Orthoptera
- Suborder: Caelifera
- Family: Tetrigidae
- Subfamily: Metrodorinae
- Tribe: Metrodorini
- Genus: Metrodora; Bolívar, 1887

Genus of Orthoptera

External image
- Images at iNaturalist

Metrodora is a genus of groundhoppers or pygmy grasshoppers that is typical of the subfamily Metrodorinae and tribe Metrodorini; it was erected by Ignacio Bolívar in 1887. Species of Metrodora are recorded from central and South America. Several other species were placed here previously, but have been moved to other genera such as Platytettix (in the same subtribe Metrodorina).

== Species ==
These species belong to the genus Metrodora:

1. Metrodora colombiae Günther, 1939
2. Metrodora rana Bolívar, 1887 - type species

(Note: For Metrodora mollilobata Kasalo & Skejo, 2025 see Hebardidora harroweri (Hebard, 1924) per Cadena-Castañeda et al. 2025).
