= Cleostratoides =

Scientific classification
- Domain: Eukaryota
- Kingdom: Animalia
- Phylum: Arthropoda
- Class: Insecta
- Order: Orthoptera
- Suborder: Caelifera
- Family: Tetrigidae
- Subfamily: Metrodorinae
- Genus: Cleostratoides; Storozhenko, 2013
- Species: C. exoticus

Binomial name
- Cleostratoides exoticus Storozhenko, 2013

Genus of grasshoppers

Cleostratoides is a genus of ground-hoppers (Orthoptera: Caelifera) in the subfamily Metrodorinae and not assigned to any tribe.

The genus is currently considered monotypic, with the species Cleostratoides exoticus Storozhenko, 2013 found in Vietnam: the type locality was Buon Luoi village, Gia Lai Province.
