= Rhopalotettix =

Scientific classification
- Domain: Eukaryota
- Kingdom: Animalia
- Phylum: Arthropoda
- Class: Insecta
- Order: Orthoptera
- Suborder: Caelifera
- Family: Tetrigidae
- Subfamily: Metrodorinae
- Tribe: Ophiotettigini
- Genus: Rhopalotettix; Hancock, 1910

Synonyms
- Paramitraria Willemse, 1928; Rhopalotarsus Hancock, 1913; Sibynae Liang & Zheng, 1985

Genus of Caelifera

External image
- Images at iNaturalist

Rhopalotettix is a genus of Asian ground-hoppers (Orthoptera: Caelifera) in the subfamily Metrodorinae and since 2017 placed in the tribe Ophiotettigini; it was erected by Joseph Hancock in 1910. The recorded distribution for species in this genus is southern China, Indochina and western Malesia.

== Species ==
The Orthoptera Species File lists:

1. Rhopalotettix borneensis Tinkham, 1939
2. Rhopalotettix chinensis Tinkham, 1939
3. Rhopalotettix clavipes Hancock, 1910 - type species
4. Rhopalotettix gracilis (Willemse, 1928)
5. Rhopalotettix guangxiensis Zheng & Jiang, 1998
6. Rhopalotettix hainanensis Tinkham, 1939
7. Rhopalotettix taipeiensis Zhang, Yin & Yin, 2003
8. Rhopalotettix taiwanensis Liang, 1993
9. Rhopalotettix tinkhami Storozhenko, 2016
10. Rhopalotettix uncusivertex Zheng, 2003
11. Rhopalotettix vietnamensis Storozhenko, 2015
