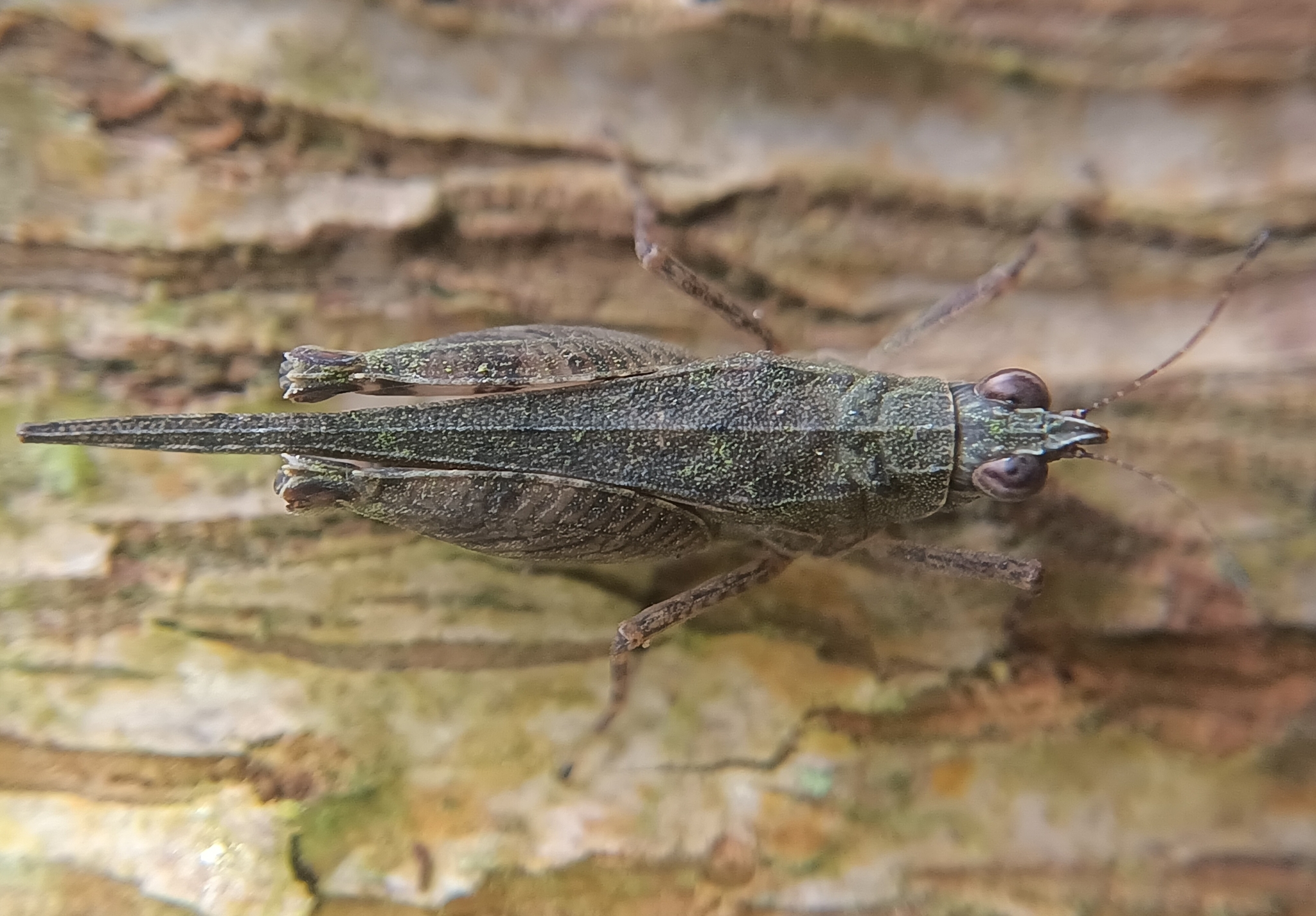
- Cleostratus depauperatus

Scientific classification
- Kingdom: Animalia
- Phylum: Arthropoda
- Clade: Pancrustacea
- Class: Insecta
- Order: Orthoptera
- Suborder: Caelifera
- Family: Tetrigidae
- Subfamily: Metrodorinae
- Tribe: Cleostratini
- Genus: Cleostratus; Stål, 1877

= Cleostratus (insect) =

Genus of grasshoppers

Cleostratus is a genus of Asian groundhoppers (Orthoptera: Caelifera) in the subfamily Metrodorinae and is the type genus of the tribe Cleostratini; it was erected by Carl Stål in 1877. Species in this genus have a recorded distribution only from the Philippines.

== Species ==
The Orthoptera Species File includes:

1. Cleostratus depauperatus Günther, 1938
2. Cleostratus helleri Günther, 1938
3. Cleostratus longifrons Stål, 1877
4. Cleostratus monocerus Stål, 1877 – type species
5. Cleostratus omelkoi Storozhenko, 2025
