= Epitettix =

Scientific classification
- Kingdom: Animalia
- Phylum: Arthropoda
- Clade: Pancrustacea
- Class: Insecta
- Order: Orthoptera
- Suborder: Caelifera
- Superfamily: Tetrigoidea
- Family: Tetrigidae
- Subfamily: Cladonotinae
- Genus: Epitettix; Hancock, 1907

Synonyms
- Pseudepitettix Zheng, 1995; Pseudopitettix Jiang & Liang, 2004; Vaotettix Podgornaya, 1986

Genus of grasshoppers

External image
- Epitettix images at iNaturalist

Epitettix' is a genus of ground-hoppers (Orthoptera: Caelifera) in the subfamily Cladonotinae and typical of the new (2023) tribe Epitettigini; records are from Madagascar and Asia.

== Species ==
Epitettix includes the species:

1. Epitettix convexa (Deng, 2021)
2. Epitettix dammermanni Günther, 1939
3. Epitettix emarginatus (Haan, 1843)
4. Epitettix fatigans Günther, 1938
5. Epitettix guangxiensis (Zheng & Jiang, 1994)
6. Epitettix guibeiensis (Zheng & Jiang, 1995)
7. Epitettix hainanensis (Deng, 2020)
8. Epitettix humilicolus Günther, 1938
9. Epitettix lativertex Günther, 1938
10. Epitettix linaoshanensis (Liang & Jiang, 2004)
11. Epitettix mikhailovi Storozhenko, 2021
12. Epitettix nigritibis (Zheng & Jiang, 2000)
13. Epitettix obtusus Storozhenko & Dawwrueng, 2014
14. Epitettix parallelus (Podgornaya, 1986)
15. Epitettix pimkarnae (Storozhenko & Dawwrueng, 2014)
16. Epitettix punctatus Hancock, 1907 - type species
17. Epitettix spheniscus Günther, 1974
18. Epitettix strictivertex (Deng, 2020)
19. Epitettix striganovae Storozhenko, 2012
20. Epitettix torulosinota Zheng & Lin, 2016
21. Epitettix tumidus Günther, 1938
22. Epitettix yunnanensis (Zheng, 1995)
