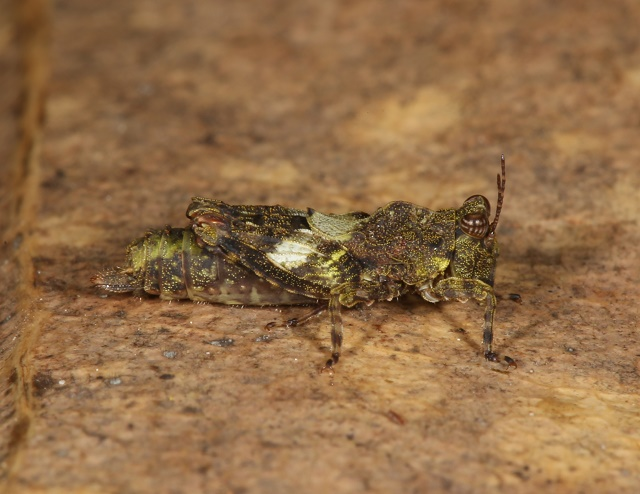
- Amphinotus nymphula

Scientific classification
- Kingdom: Animalia
- Phylum: Arthropoda
- Clade: Pancrustacea
- Class: Insecta
- Order: Orthoptera
- Suborder: Caelifera
- Family: Tetrigidae
- Subfamily: Metrodorinae
- Genus: Amphinotus; Hancock, 1915

Type species
- Amphinotus pygmaeus Hancock, 1915

Species
- A. amamiensis (Ichikawa, 1994); A. grandis Günther, 1938; A. minutus (Bolívar, 1898); A. muscosus Henry, 1933; A. nymphula (Bolívar, 1912); A. okinawaensis Uchida, 2001; A. overbecki Günther, 1939; A. pupulus (Bolívar, 1912); A. pygmaeus Hancock, 1915

= Amphinotus =

Genus of groundhoppers

Amphinotus is a genus of groundhoppers in the subfamily Metrodorinae and not assigned to any tribe. It was described in 1915 by Joseph Hancock.
