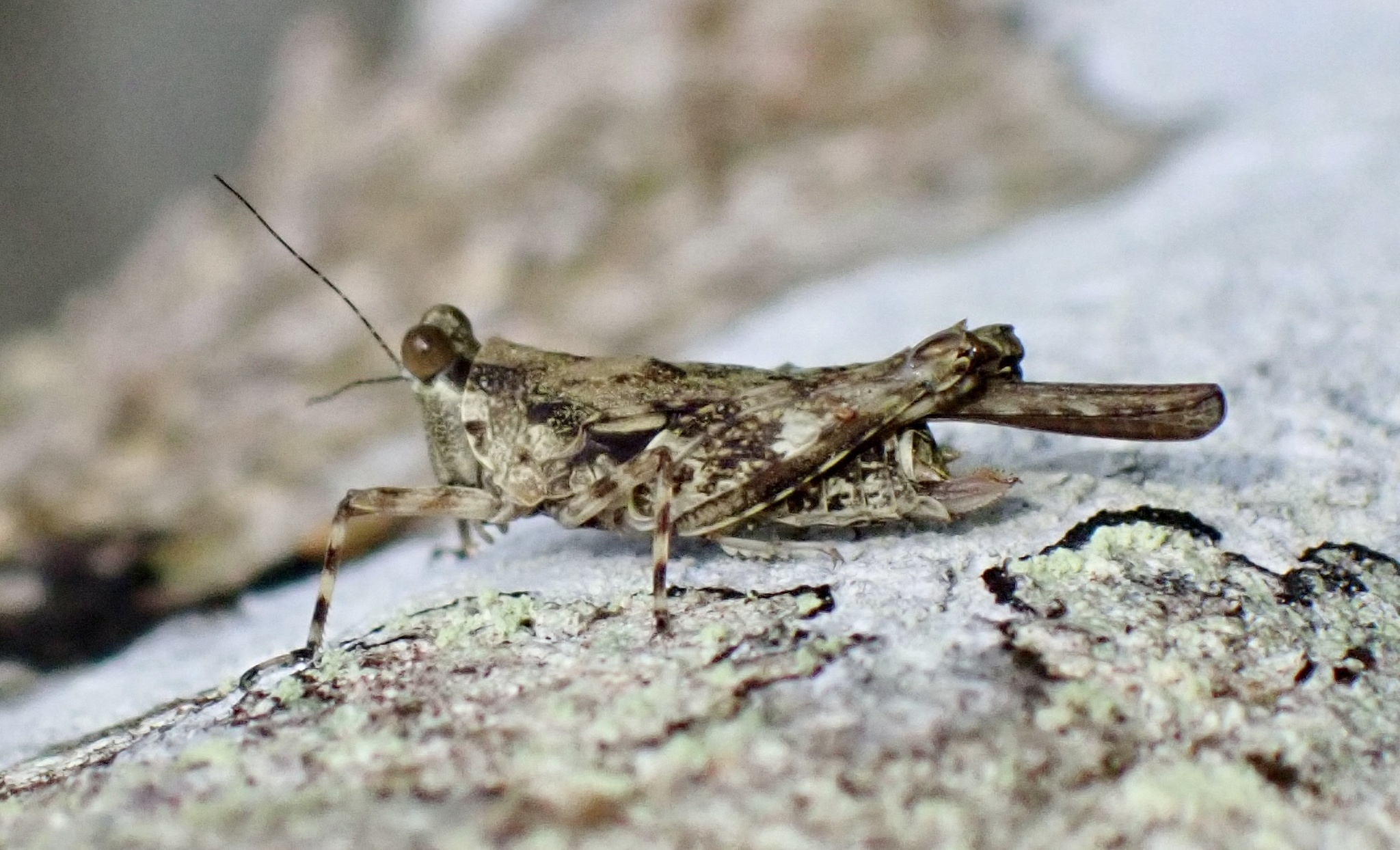
- Mazarredia celebica

Scientific classification
- Kingdom: Animalia
- Phylum: Arthropoda
- Class: Insecta
- Order: Orthoptera
- Suborder: Caelifera
- Superfamily: Tetrigoidea
- Family: Tetrigidae
- Subfamily: Metrodorinae
- Genus: Mazarredia; Bolívar, 1887

= Mazarredia =

Genus of grasshoppers

Mazarredia is an Asian genus of ground-hoppers (Orthoptera: Caelifera) in the subfamily Metrodorinae and not assigned to any tribe.

== Species ==
Mazarredia includes the following species, in two subgenera:

subgenus Mazarredia Bolívar, 1887

- Mazarredia lativertex Deng & Zheng, 2013 [temporary name]
- Mazarredia annamensis Günther, 1939
- Mazarredia arcusihumeralia Zheng, Li & Shi, 2003
- Mazarredia bamaensis Deng, Zheng & Wei, 2007
- Mazarredia bolivari Blackith & Blackith, 1987
- Mazarredia brachynota Zheng, 1998
- Mazarredia cervina (Walker, 1871)
- Mazarredia chishuia Zheng & Li, 2006
- Mazarredia consocia (Walker, 1871)
- Mazarredia convexa Deng, Zheng & Zhan, 2010
- Mazarredia convexaoides Deng & Zheng, 2015
- Mazarredia cristulata Bolívar, 1902
- Mazarredia curvimarginia Zheng, 1998
- Mazarredia gemella Bolívar, 1887 - type species
- Mazarredia gongshanensis Zheng & Ou, 2003
- Mazarredia guangxiensis Deng, Zheng & Wei, 2007
- Mazarredia heishidingensis Zheng, 2005
- Mazarredia huanjiangensis Zheng & Jiang, 1994
- Mazarredia hunanensis Zheng, 2014
- Mazarredia hupingshanensis Zheng, 2014
- Mazarredia interrupta Zheng, 2003
- Mazarredia jiangxiensis Zheng & Shi, 2009
- Mazarredia jinggangshanensis Zheng, 2014
- Mazarredia jinxiuensis Zheng, 2003
- Mazarredia lochengensis Zheng, 2005
- Mazarredia longipennioides Zheng & Ou, 2010
- Mazarredia longipennis Zheng, Jiang & Liu, 2005
- Mazarredia longshengensis Zheng & Jiang, 1998
- Mazarredia maoershanensis Zheng, Shi & Mao, 2010
- Mazarredia medogensis Zheng, 2012
- Mazarredia nigripennis Deng, Zheng & Wei, 2007
- Mazarredia nigritibia Zheng & Ou, 2011
- Mazarredia ophthalmica Bolívar, 1909
- Mazarredia parabrachynota Zheng & Ou, 2010
- Mazarredia planitarsus Hancock, 1907
- Mazarredia platynota Zheng & Ou, 2010
- Mazarredia rufipes Stål, 1877
- Mazarredia serrifenzura Cao & Zheng, 2011
- Mazarredia sfrictivertex Deng, Zheng & Wei, 2007
- Mazarredia singlaensis Hancock, 1915
- Mazarredia sobria Walker, 1871
- Mazarredia torulosinota Zheng & Jiang, 2005
- Mazarredia undulatimarginis Deng & Zheng, 2013
- Mazarredia xizangensis Zheng & Ou, 2010

subgenus Prosoaltus Hancock, 1913

- Mazarredia cephalica (Haan, 1843)
