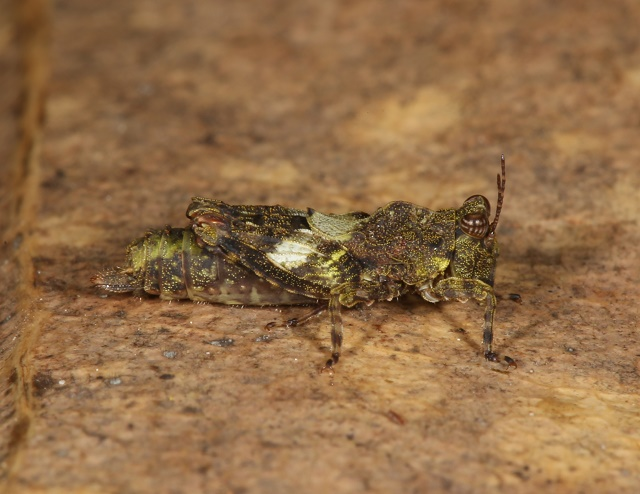
- Amphinotus nymphula in its natural habitat

Conservation status
- Endangered (IUCN 3.1)

Scientific classification
- Domain: Eukaryota
- Kingdom: Animalia
- Phylum: Arthropoda
- Class: Insecta
- Order: Orthoptera
- Suborder: Caelifera
- Family: Tetrigidae
- Genus: Amphinotus
- Species: A. nymphula

Binomial name
- Amphinotus nymphula (Bolivar, 1912)

= Amphinotus nymphula =

Species of grasshopper

Amphinotus nymphula is an insect species endemic to the Seychelles group of islands. It is a restricted range species with an area of occupancy ranging 10 square kilometres (3.9 sq mi), bounded by a protected area. The primary habitat of this species is leaf litter and moss on trees in cloud forests. The species is threatened by habitat deterioration and its sensitivity to climate change. Females of the species are more often found close to the invasive plant Clidemia hirta compared to males. It is hypothesized that the invasive plant species has a negative effect on Tetrigidae as it changes the microclimate in the habitat by changing the habitat's structure and providing more shade. Possibly, the males of the species are more sensitive to any changes, as they are relatively more active than the females and may require more sunlight.
