= Xerophyllum (insect) =

Scientific classification
- Domain: Eukaryota
- Kingdom: Animalia
- Phylum: Arthropoda
- Class: Insecta
- Order: Orthoptera
- Suborder: Caelifera
- Family: Tetrigidae
- Subfamily: Cladonotinae
- Tribe: Xerophyllini
- Genus: Xerophyllum; Fairmaire, 1846

Genus of grasshoppers

External image
- Images at iNaturalist

Xerophyllum is a genus of African groundhoppers in the tribe Xerophyllini. There are at least two described species in Xerophyllum.

== Species ==
These two species belong to the genus Xerophyllum:

- Xerophyllum cortices Buckton, 1903
- Xerophyllum platycorys (Westwood, 1839)
