= Deltonotus =

Scientific classification
- Kingdom: Animalia
- Phylum: Arthropoda
- Clade: Pancrustacea
- Class: Insecta
- Order: Orthoptera
- Suborder: Caelifera
- Superfamily: Tetrigoidea
- Family: Tetrigidae
- Subfamily: Cladonotinae
- Genus: Deltonotus; Hancock, 1904

Species
- See text

Synonyms
- Poecilotettix Bolívar, 1902

Genus of grasshoppers

Deltonotus is an Asian genus of ground-hoppers (Orthoptera: Caelifera) in the subfamily Cladonotinae and tribe Cladonotini.

== Species ==
Deltonotus includes the species:

- Deltonotus gibbiceps (Bolívar, 1902)
- Deltonotus hainanensis Zheng & Liang, 1985
- Deltonotus subcucullatus (Walker, 1871) – type species (as D. tectiformis Hancock)
- Deltonotus vietnamensis Storozhenko, 2011
