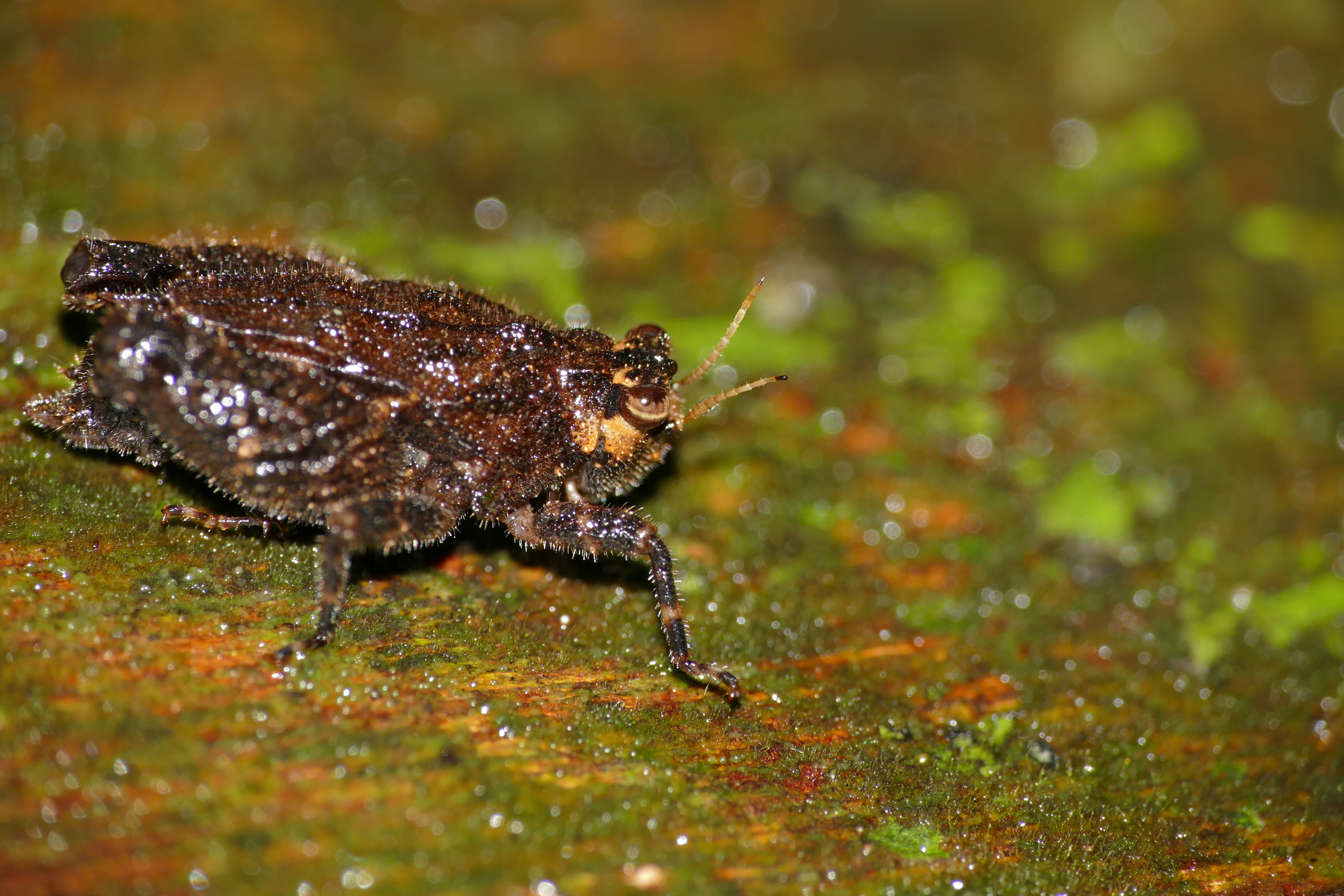
- Potua morbillosa

Scientific classification
- Domain: Eukaryota
- Kingdom: Animalia
- Phylum: Arthropoda
- Class: Insecta
- Order: Orthoptera
- Suborder: Caelifera
- Family: Tetrigidae
- Subfamily: Cladonotinae; Bolívar, 1887

= Cladonotinae =

Subfamily of grasshoppers

Cladonotinae is a subfamily of groundhoppers (Orthoptera: Caelifera) containing more than 70 genera and 260 described species. These insects are found in tropical areas world-wide.

== Tribes and genera ==
The following genera, in four tribes, belong to the subfamily Cladonotinae:

=== Choriphyllini ===
Auth. Cadena-Castañeda & Silva, 2019; central America

1. Choriphyllum Serville, 1838
2. Phyllotettix Hancock, 1902

=== Cladonotini ===
External image
- Cladonotini images at iNaturalist

Auth. Bolívar, 1887; tropical Asia

1. Boczkitettix Tumbrinck, 2014
2. Cladonotus Saussure, 1862
3. Deltonotus Hancock, 1904
4. Diotarus Stål, 1877
5. Dolatettix Hancock, 1907
6. Gignotettix Hancock, 1909
7. Hancockella Uvarov, 1940
8. Holoarcus Hancock, 1909
9. Hymenotes Westwood, 1837
10. Misythus Stål, 1877
11. Piezotettix Bolívar, 1887
12. Yunnantettix Zheng, 1995

=== Epitettigini ===
External image
- Epitettix images at iNaturalist

Authority: Storozhenko, 2023; distribution: Madagascar, SE Asia to New Guinea

1. Epitettix Hancock, 1907
2. Ingrischitettix Tumbrinck, 2014
3. Pseudohyboella Günther, 1938
4. Yunnantettix Zheng, 1995

=== Trusmaditetrigini ===
Authority: Storozhenko, 2023; distribution: Australasia to Borneo

1. Devriesetettix Tumbrinck, 2014
2. Eurymorphopus Hancock, 1907
3. Ichikawatettix Tumbrinck, 2014
4. Planotettix Tumbrinck, 2014
5. Tepperotettix Rehn, 1952
6. Trusmaditetrix Storozhenko, 2023

=== Valalyllini ===
Auth.: Deranja, Kasalo, Adžić, Franjević & Skejo, 2022; Madagascar

1. Lepocranus - monotypic L. fuscus Devriese, 1991
2. Valalyllum - monotypic V. folium Deranja, Kasalo, Adžić, Franjević & Skejo, 2022

=== Xerophyllini ===
External image
- Xerophyllini images at iNaturalist

Auth. Günther, 1979; Africa, southern Asia including Malesia

genus group Potua

1. Cladonotella Hancock, 1909
2. Gestroana Berg, 1898
3. Notredamia Skejo, Deranja & Adžić, 2020
4. Potua Bolívar, 1887

other genera

1. Acmophyllum Karsch, 1890
2. Astyalus Rehn, 1939
3. Cladoramus Hancock, 1907
4. Morphopoides Rehn, 1930
5. Morphopus Bolívar, 1905
6. Pantelia Bolívar, 1887
7. Paulytettix Devriese, 1999
8. Royitettix Devriese, 1999
9. Sanjetettix Devriese, 1999
10. Seyidotettix Rehn, 1939
11. Trachytettix Stål, 1876
12. Trypophyllum Karsch, 1890
13. Xerophyllum Fairmaire, 1846

=== incertae sedis ===
1. Afrolarcus Günther, 1979
2. Aspiditettix Liang, Chen, Li & Chen, 2009
3. Deltonotusoides Deng, 2021
4. Eleleus Bolívar, 1887
5. Fieberiana Kirby, 1914
6. Hainantettix Deng, 2020
7. Hippodes Karsch, 1890
8. Microthymochares Devriese, 1991
9. Nesotettix Holdhaus, 1909
10. Pelusca Bolívar, 1912
11. Peraxelpa Sjöstedt, 1932
12. Stegaceps Hancock, 1913
13. Tetradinodula Zha, 2017
14. Thymochares (insect) Rehn, 1929
15. Tondanotettix Willemse, 1928
16. Tuberfemurus Zheng, 1992
17. Willemsetettix Tumbrinck, 2014
