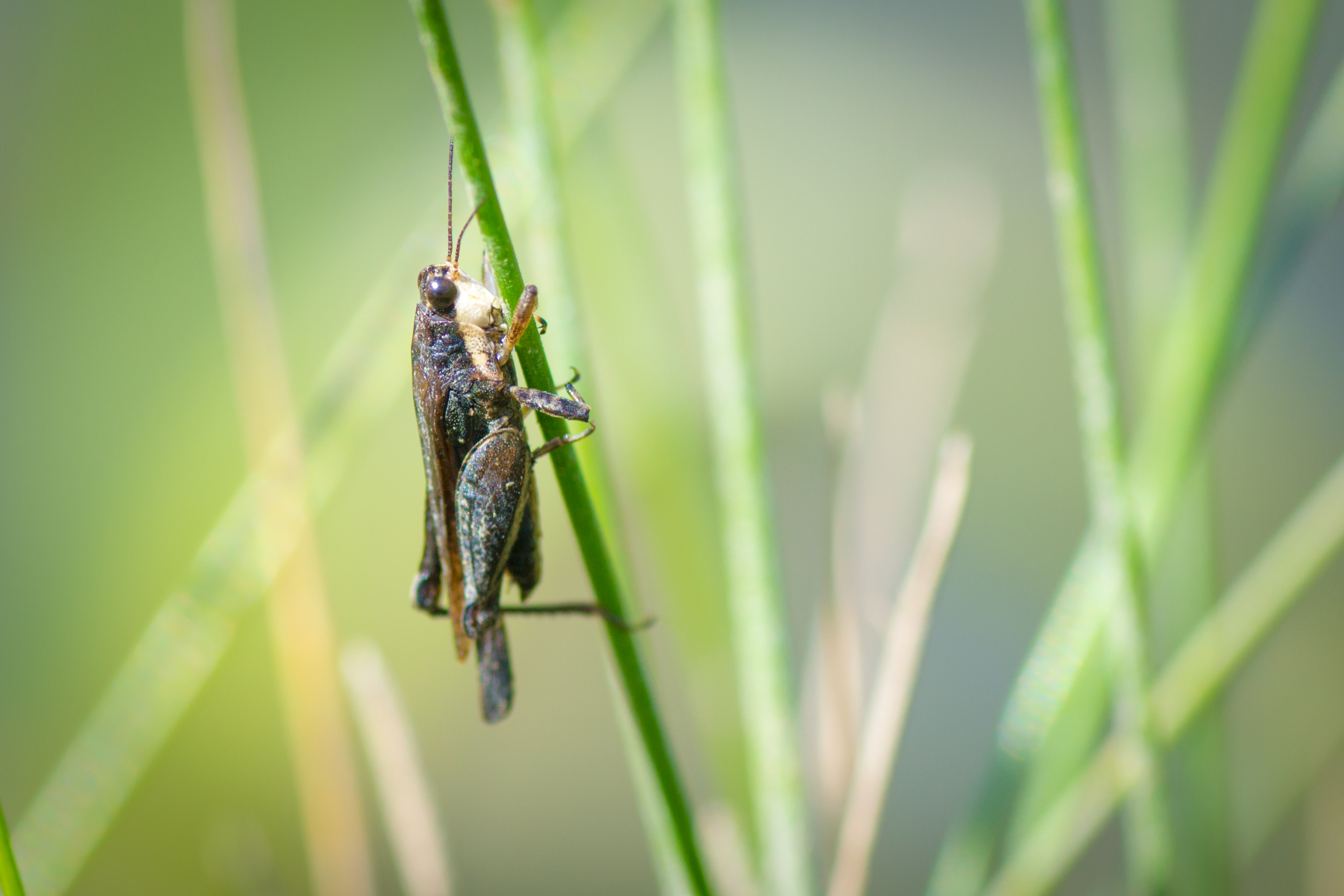

Scientific classification
- Domain: Eukaryota
- Kingdom: Animalia
- Phylum: Arthropoda
- Class: Insecta
- Order: Orthoptera
- Suborder: Caelifera
- Family: Tetrigidae
- Subfamily: Batrachideinae
- Tribe: Batrachideini
- Genus: Tettigidea
- Species: T. lateralis

Binomial name
- Tettigidea lateralis (Say, 1824)

= Tettigidea lateralis =

Species of grasshopper

Tettigidea lateralis, known generally as black-sided pygmy grasshopper, is a species of pygmy grasshopper in the family Tetrigidae. Other common names include the black-sided grouse locust and sedge grouse locust. It is found in the Caribbean Sea, North America, and parts of Central America (including Guatemala, Honduras, Nicaragua, Costa Rica, and Panama).

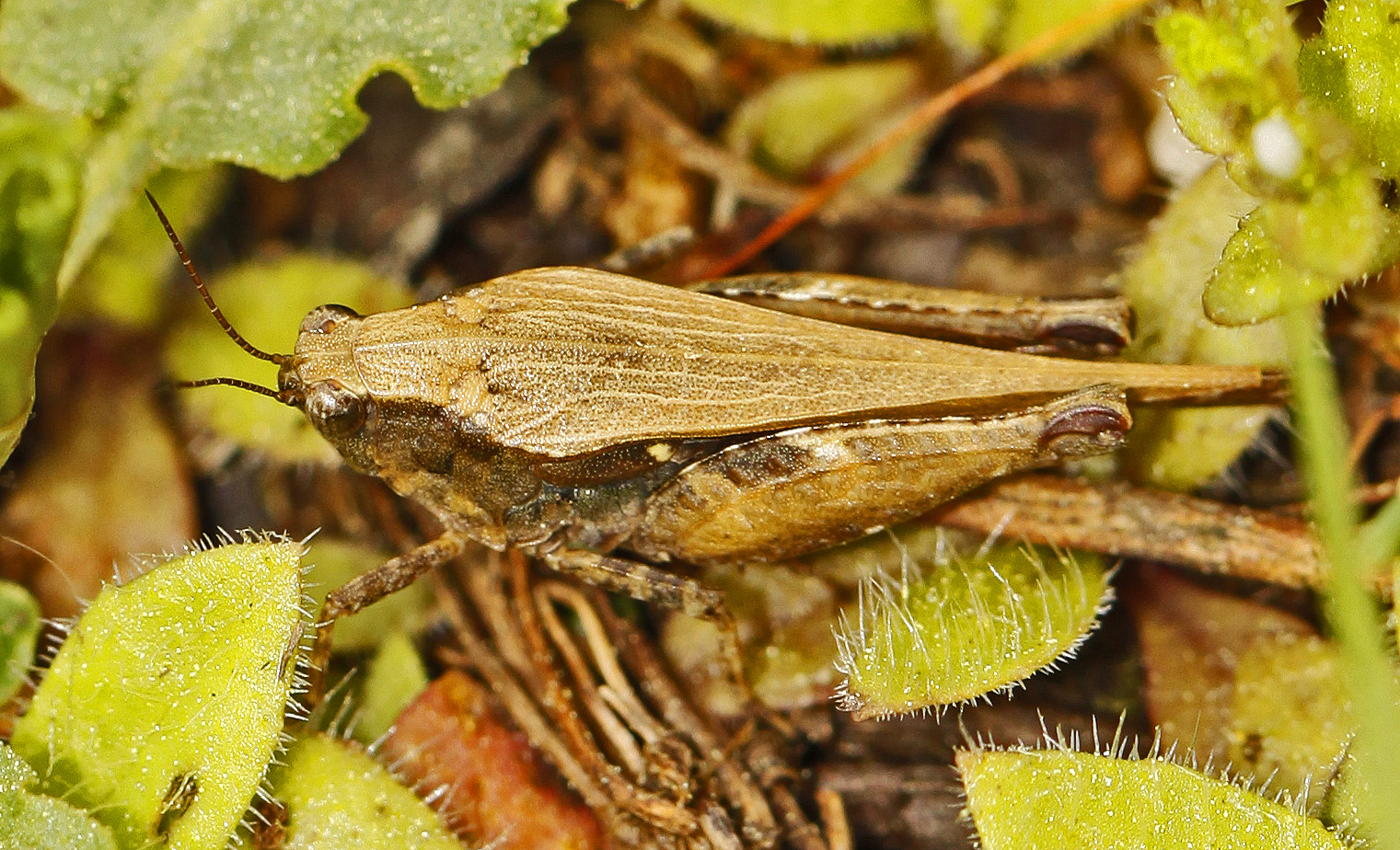
Black-sided pygmy grasshopper, Tettigidea lateralis

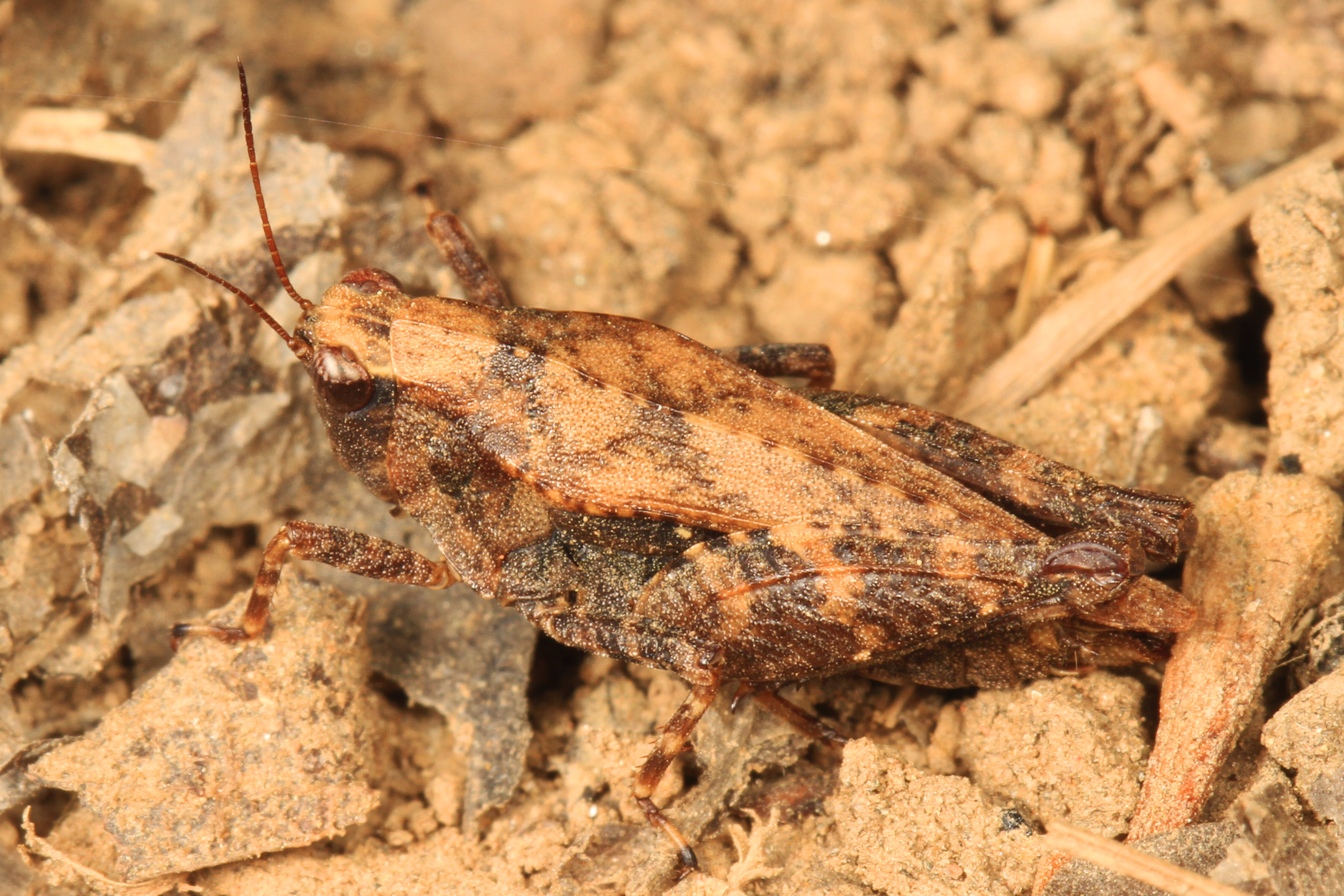
Black-sided pygmy grasshopper, Tettigidea lateralis

== Subspecies ==
These two subspecies belong to the species Tettigidea lateralis:

- Tettigidea lateralis cazieri Rehn & Grant, 1958
- Tettigidea lateralis lateralis (Say, 1824)
