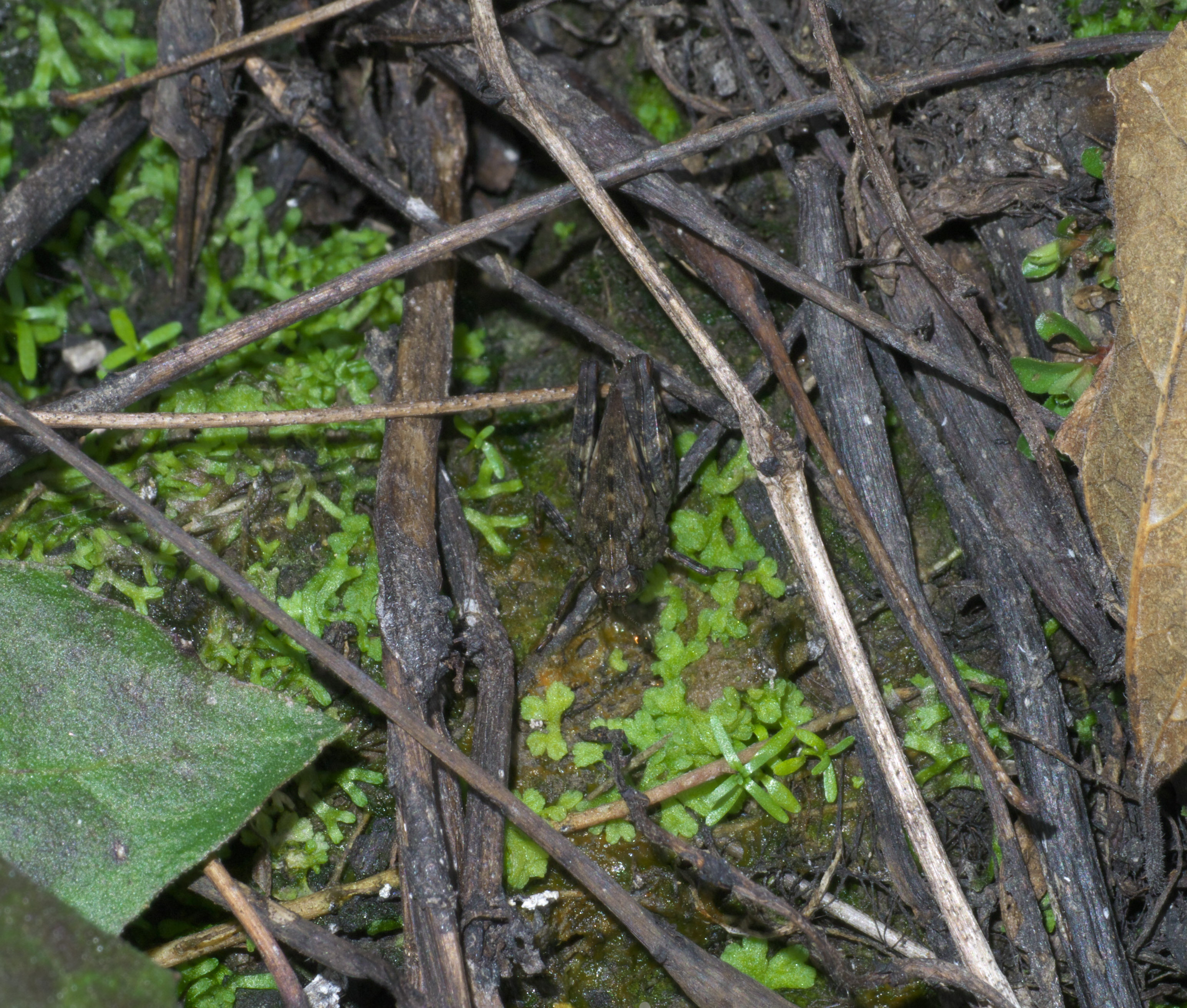

Scientific classification
- Domain: Eukaryota
- Kingdom: Animalia
- Phylum: Arthropoda
- Class: Insecta
- Order: Orthoptera
- Suborder: Caelifera
- Family: Tetrigidae
- Subfamily: Batrachideinae
- Tribe: Batrachideini
- Genus: Tettigidea
- Species: T. armata

Binomial name
- Tettigidea armata Morse, 1895

= Tettigidea armata =

Species of grasshopper

Tettigidea armata is a species in the family Tetrigidae ("pygmy grasshoppers"), in the order Orthoptera ("grasshoppers, crickets, katydids"). The species is known generally as the "armored pygmy grasshopper", "armoured grouse locust", or "spined grouse locust". It is found in North America.

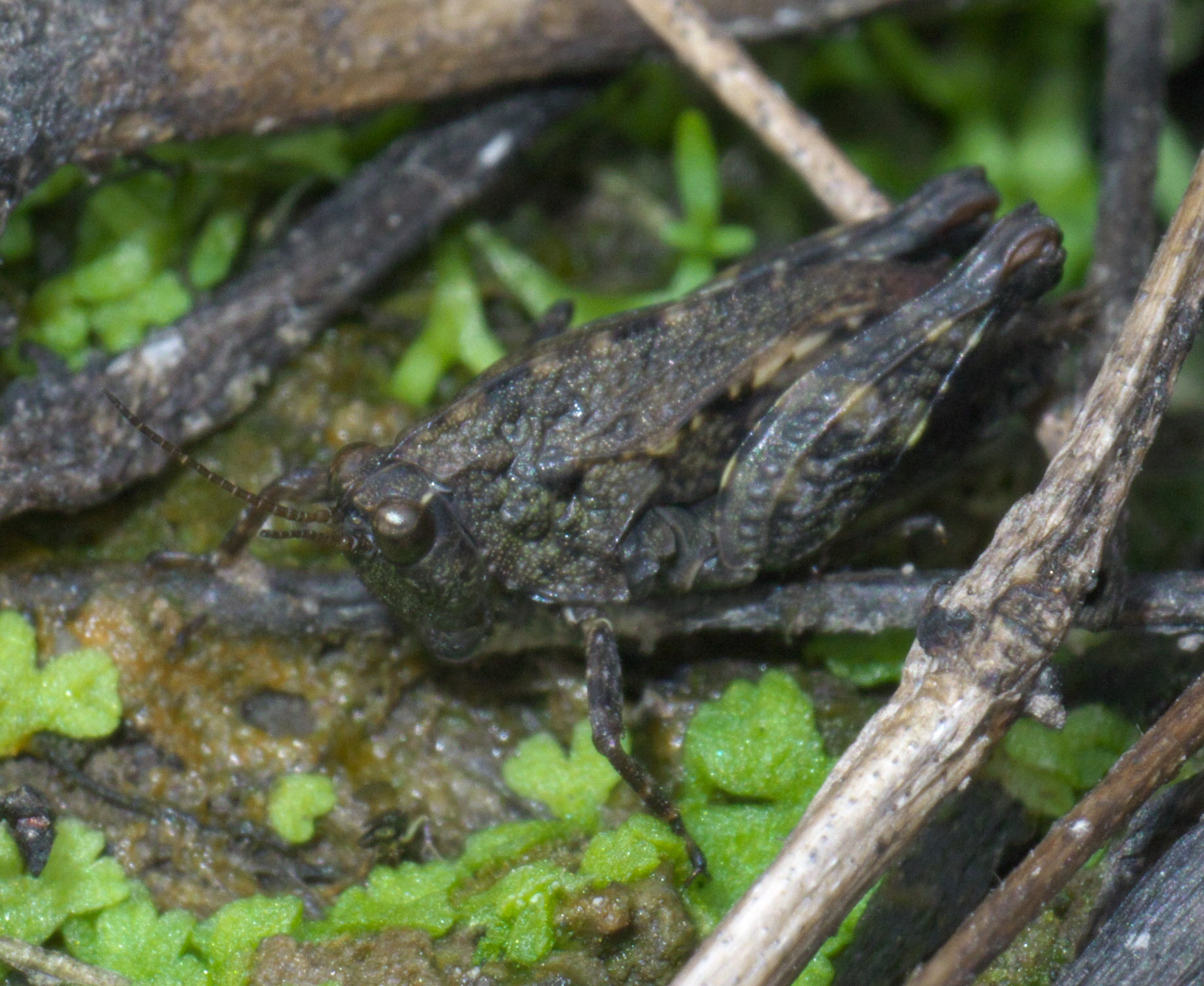
Armored Pygmy Grasshopper, Tettigidea armata, Pryor, OK, USA
