= Tettigidea prorsa =

Scientific classification
- Domain: Eukaryota
- Kingdom: Animalia
- Phylum: Arthropoda
- Class: Insecta
- Order: Orthoptera
- Suborder: Caelifera
- Family: Tetrigidae
- Subfamily: Batrachideinae
- Tribe: Batrachideini
- Genus: Tettigidea
- Species: T. prorsa

Binomial name
- Tettigidea prorsa Scudder, 1877

Species of grasshopper

Tettigidea prorsa, known generally as the cone-head pygmy grasshopper or coneheaded grouse locust, is a species of pygmy grasshopper in the family Tetrigidae. It is found in North America.
