= Tettigidea empedonepia =

Conservation status
- Critically Endangered (IUCN 2.3)

Scientific classification
- Kingdom: Animalia
- Phylum: Arthropoda
- Class: Insecta
- Order: Orthoptera
- Suborder: Caelifera
- Family: Tetrigidae
- Subfamily: Batrachideinae
- Tribe: Batrachideini
- Genus: Tettigidea
- Species: T. empedonepia

Binomial name
- Tettigidea empedonepia Hubbell, 1937

Species of grasshopper

Tettigidea empedonepia, the Torreya pygmy grasshopper, is a species of grasshopper in the family Tetrigidae. The type locality is Camp Torreya in Liberty County, Florida. According to Orthoptera Species File, it has also been found in Cuba.
