= Scaria =

Scaria may refer to:

- A frazione of the comune of Alta Valle Intelvi
- Scaria (grasshopper), a genus of grasshoppers in the family Tetrigidae
- Scaria (surname), surname
