= Scaria (surname) =

Scaria is a surname. Notable persons with that surname include:

- Emil Scaria (1838–1886), Austrian bass-baritone
- Vinod Scaria (born 1981), Indian biologist, medical researcher pioneering in Precision Medicine and Clinical Genomics

== See also ==
- Scaria
