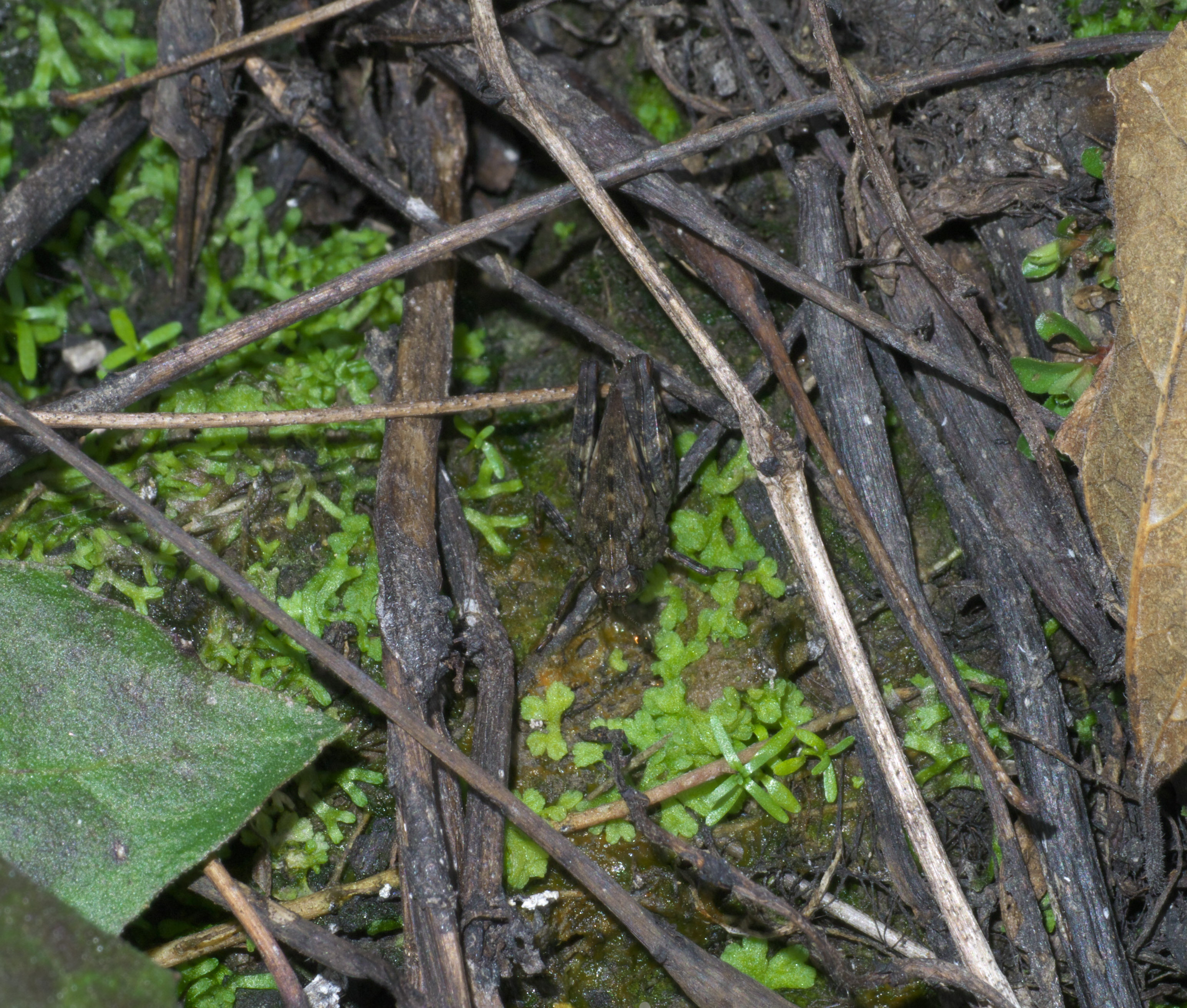
- Tettigidea armata

Scientific classification
- Domain: Eukaryota
- Kingdom: Animalia
- Phylum: Arthropoda
- Class: Insecta
- Order: Orthoptera
- Suborder: Caelifera
- Family: Tetrigidae
- Tribe: Batrachideini
- Genus: Tettigidea; Scudder, 1863

= Tettigidea =

Genus of grasshoppers

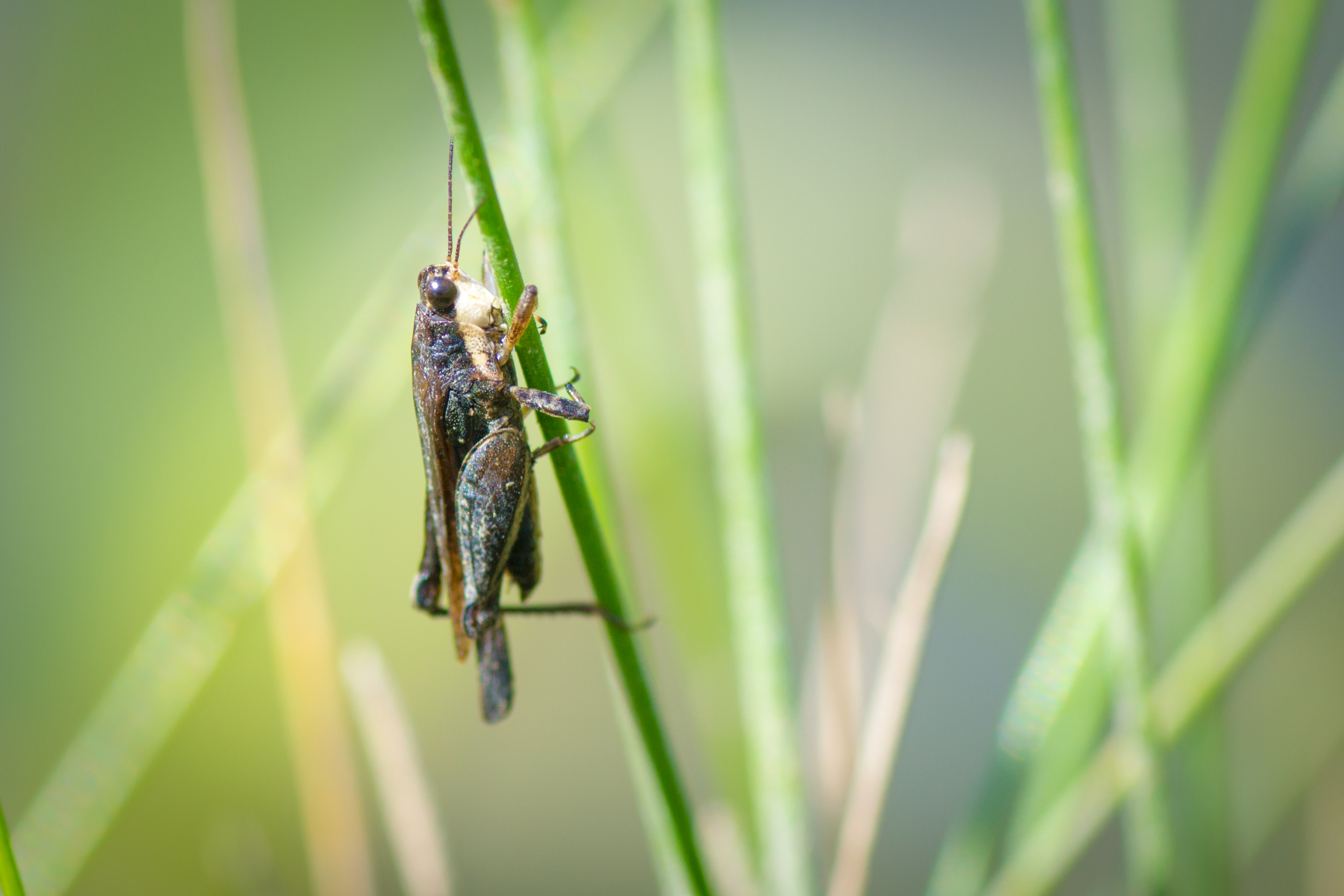
Tettigidea lateralis

Tettigidea is a genus of groundhoppers or pygmy grasshoppers in the tribe Batrachideini from the Americas. There are at least 40 described species in Tettigidea.

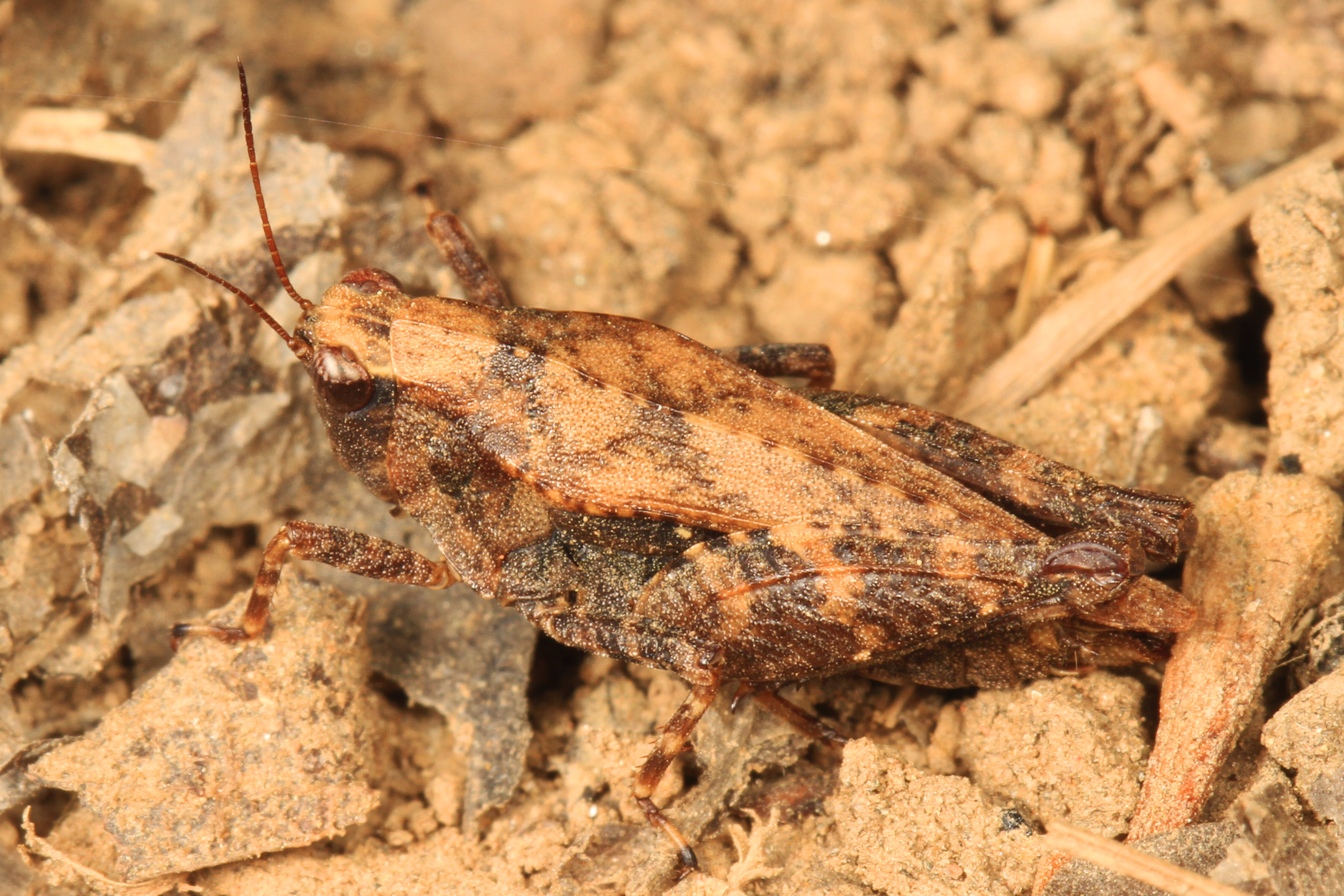
Tettigidea lateralis

== Species ==
- Tettigidea acuta Morse, 1895 (acute pygmy grasshopper)
- Tettigidea angustihumeralis Podgornaya, 1999
- Tettigidea annulipes Bruner, L., 1910
- Tettigidea arcuata Bruner, L., 1910
- Tettigidea armata Morse, 1895 (armored pygmy grasshopper)
- Tettigidea australis Hancock, J.L., 1900
- Tettigidea bruneri Morse, 1900
- Tettigidea chapadensis Bruner, L., 1910
- Tettigidea chichimeca (Saussure, 1861)
- Tettigidea corrugata Bruner, L., 1910
- Tettigidea costalis Bruner, L., 1910
- Tettigidea cuspidata Scudder, S.H., 1875
- Tettigidea empedonepia Hubbell, 1937 (neotenic pygmy grasshopper)
- Tettigidea exigua Kirby, W.F., 1910
- Tettigidea glabrata Bruner, L., 1920
- Tettigidea gracilis (Heer, 1865)
- Tettigidea granulosa Bruner, L., 1913
- Tettigidea guatemalteca Bolívar, I., 1887
- Tettigidea hancocki Bruner, L., 1910
- Tettigidea imperfecta Bruner, L., 1906
- Tettigidea intermedia Bruner, L., 1910
- Tettigidea lateralis (Say, 1824) (black-sided pygmy grasshopper)
- Tettigidea mexicana Hancock, J.L., 1915
- Tettigidea multicostata Bolívar, I., 1887
- Tettigidea neoaustralis Otte, D., 1997
- Tettigidea nicaraguae Bruner, L., 1895
- Tettigidea nigra Morse, 1900
- Tettigidea paratecta Rehn, J.A.G., 1913
- Tettigidea parradae Cadena-Castañeda & Cardona, 2015
- Tettigidea plagiata Morse, 1900
- Tettigidea planovertex Hancock, J.L., 1913
- Tettigidea planus Hancock, J.L., 1907
- Tettigidea prorsa Scudder, 1877 (cone-head pygmy grasshopper)
- Tettigidea pulchella Rehn, J.A.G., 1904
- Tettigidea scudderi Bolívar, I., 1887
- Tettigidea skejoi Cadena-Castañeda & Cardona, 2015
- Tettigidea spicatoides Hebard, 1932
- Tettigidea steinbachi Bruner, L., 1920
- Tettigidea subaptera Bruner, L., 1910
- Tettigidea tecta Morse, 1900
- Tettigidea trinitatis Bruner, L., 1906
