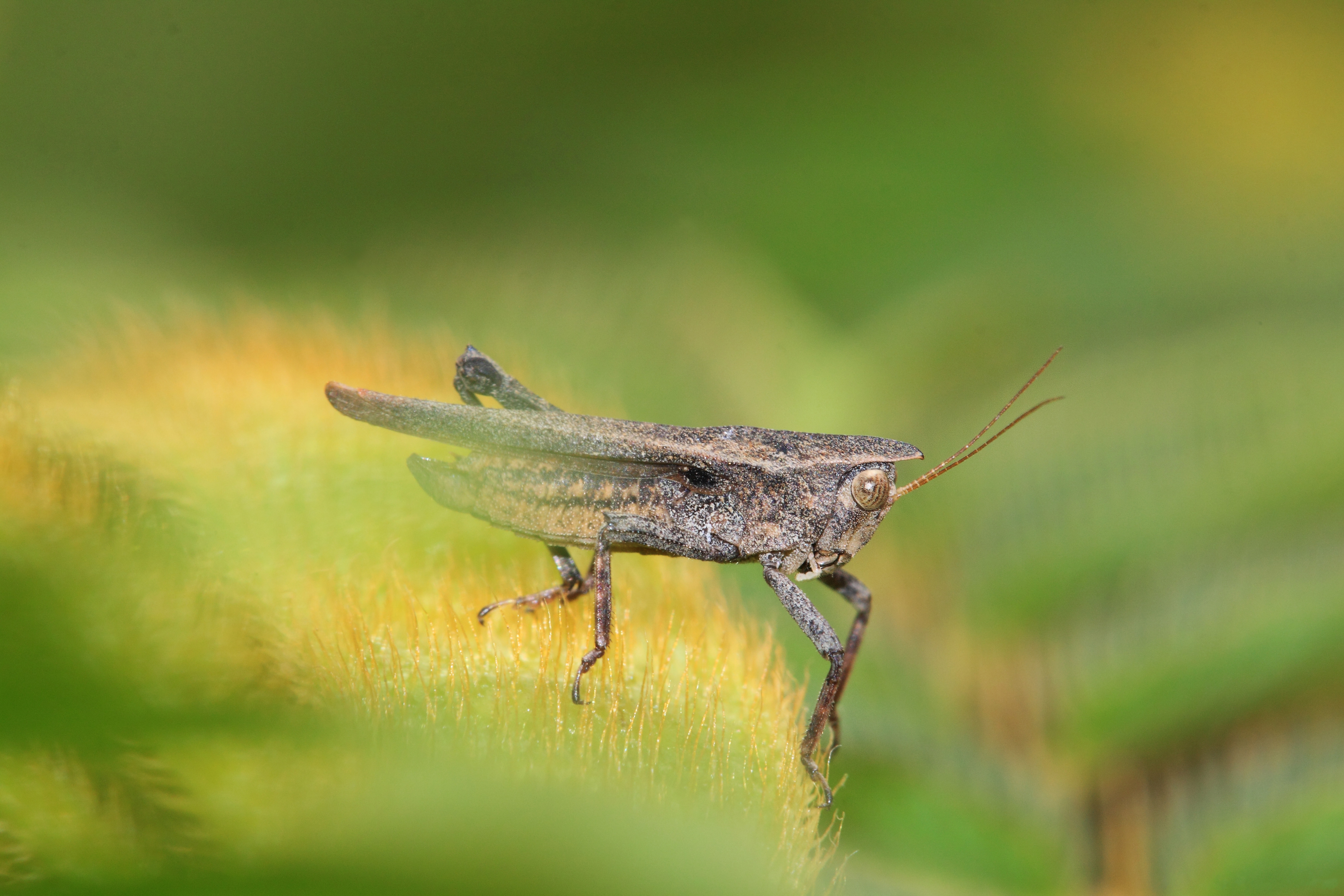
- Saussurella sp.

Scientific classification
- Kingdom: Animalia
- Phylum: Arthropoda
- Class: Insecta
- Order: Orthoptera
- Suborder: Caelifera
- Family: Tetrigidae
- Subfamily: Batrachideinae
- Tribe: Cassitettigini
- Genus: Saussurella; Bolívar, 1887

Synonyms
- Cassitettix Yin, 1984

= Saussurella =

Genus of grasshoppers

Saussurella is an Asian genus of ground-hoppers (Orthoptera: Caelifera) in the subfamily Batrachideinae.

== Species ==
The Catalogue of Life and Orthoptera Species File list:

- Saussurella acuticornis Zheng, 1998
- Saussurella borneensis Hancock, 1912
- Saussurella brachycornis Deng, 2016
- Saussurella cornuta (Haan, 1842) - type species (as Acridium cornutum Haan)
- Saussurella curticornus Hancock, 1912
- Saussurella decurva Brunner von Wattenwyl, 1893
- Saussurella indica Hancock, 1912
- Saussurella inelevata Podgornaya, 1992
- Saussurella javanica Bolívar, 1898
- Saussurella longiptera (Yin, 1984)
- Saussurella xizangensis Zheng, Lin & Shi, 2013
