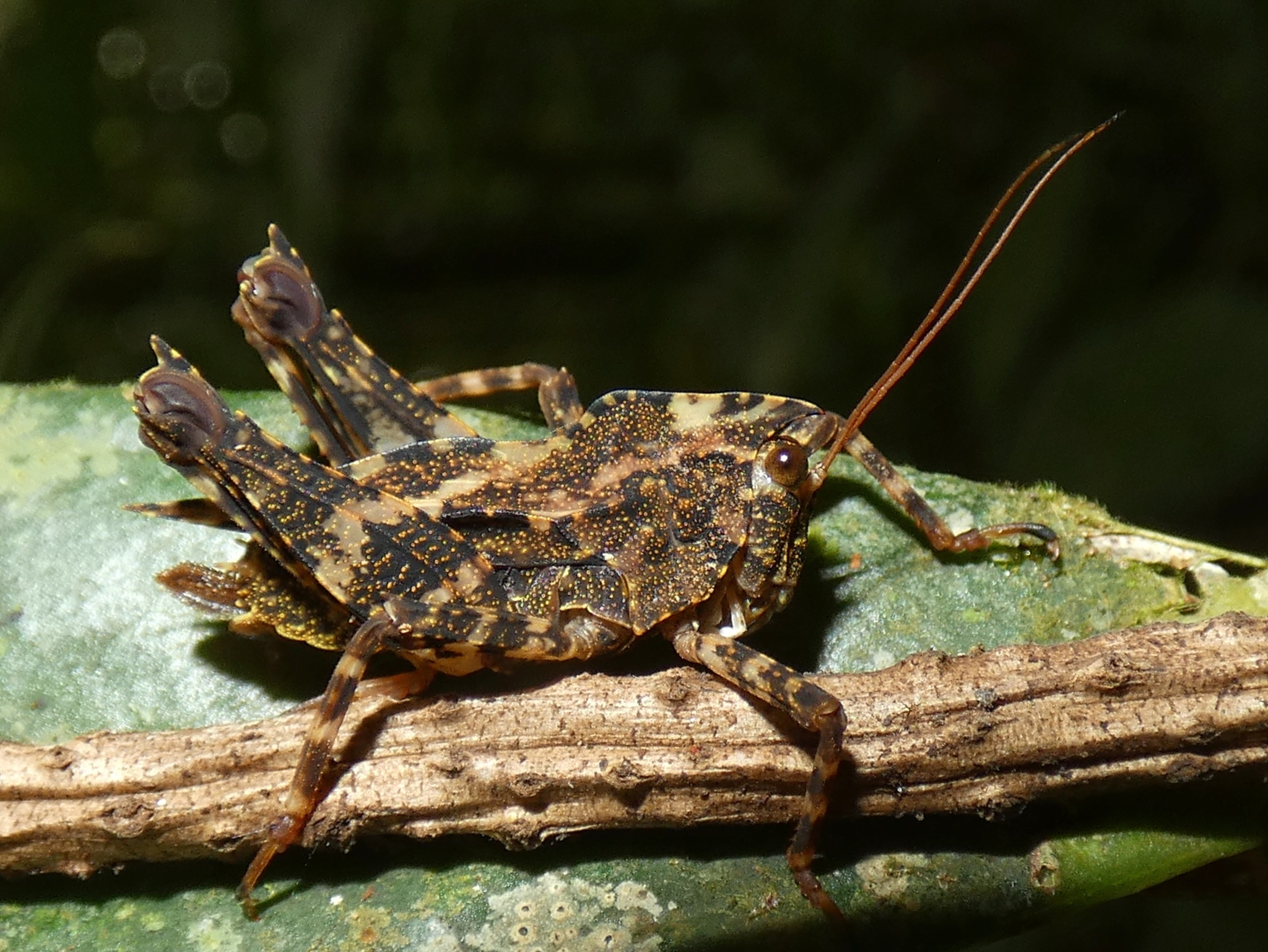
- Adult female

Scientific classification
- Kingdom: Animalia
- Phylum: Arthropoda
- Clade: Pancrustacea
- Class: Insecta
- Order: Orthoptera
- Suborder: Caelifera
- Family: Tetrigidae
- Subfamily: Batrachideinae
- Tribe: Batrachideini
- Genus: Procellator; Kasalo, Skejo & Cambra, 2023
- Species: P. kai

Binomial name
- Procellator kai Kasalo, Skejo & Cambra, 2023

= Procellator =

Genus of grasshoppers

Procellator is a genus of groundhoppers or pygmy grasshoppers in the tribe Batrachideini. It is monotypic, being represented by the single species Procellator kai, which at present has only been found in Panama.
