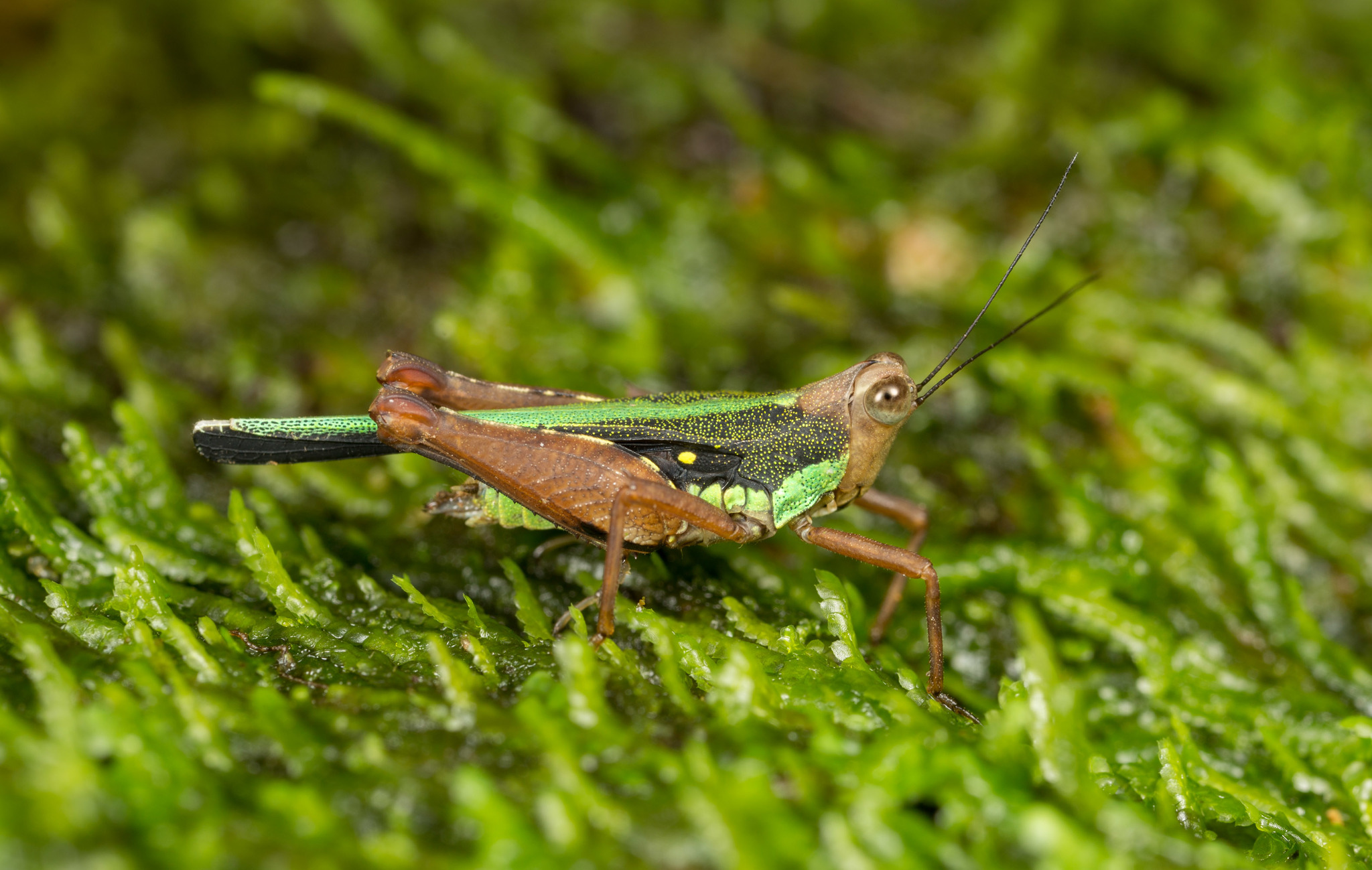
- Scaria hamata

Scientific classification
- Kingdom: Animalia
- Phylum: Arthropoda
- Class: Insecta
- Order: Orthoptera
- Suborder: Caelifera
- Family: Tetrigidae
- Tribe: Batrachideini
- Genus: Scaria; Bolívar, 1887

= Scaria (grasshopper) =

Genus of grasshoppers

Scaria is a genus of groundhoppers or pygmy grasshoppers in the tribe Batrachideini from South America. There are about eight described species in Scaria.

== Species ==
Eight named, and one nameless species belong to the genus Scaria:

- Scaria boliviana Bruner, L., 1920^{c g}
- Scaria brevis Hancock, J.L., 1909^{c g}
- Scaria fasciata Hancock, J.L., 1907^{c g}
- Scaria ferruginea Hancock, J.L., 1909^{c g}
- Scaria hamata (De Geer, 1773)^{c g}
- Scaria lineata Bolívar, I., 1887^{c g}
- Scaria maculata Giglio-Tos, 1898^{c g}
- Scaria producta Hancock, J.L., 1907^{c g}
- "the nameless Scaria"

Data sources: i = ITIS, c = Catalogue of Life, g = GBIF, b = Bugguide.net
