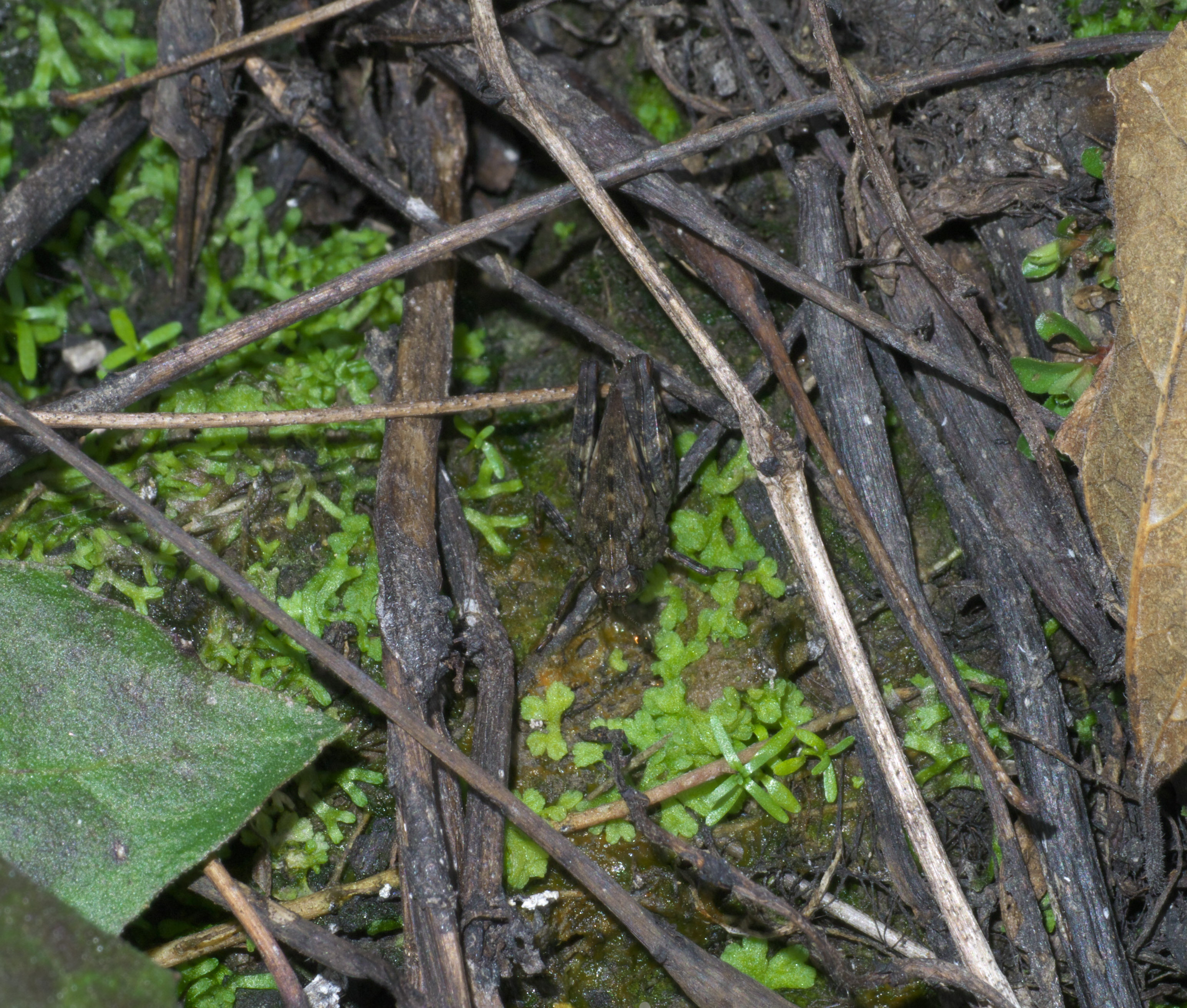
- Tettigidea armata

Scientific classification
- Kingdom: Animalia
- Phylum: Arthropoda
- Clade: Pancrustacea
- Class: Insecta
- Order: Orthoptera
- Suborder: Caelifera
- Family: Tetrigidae
- Subfamily: Batrachideinae; Bolívar, 1887

Synonyms
- Batrachideae, Batrachideidae, Batrachididae, Batrachidiini, Batrachidinae, Batrachinae, Bolívar, 1887; Bufonidae, Bufonidinae, Hancock, 1907; Cassitettiginae, Cassitettinae, Cassitettinini, Yin, 1984

= Batrachideinae =

Subfamily of grasshoppers

Batrachideinae is a subfamily of groundhoppers or pygmy grasshoppers. There are thought to be 20 genera in Batrachideinae, with genera found in the Americas, Africa, (mostly tropical) Asia and Australia.

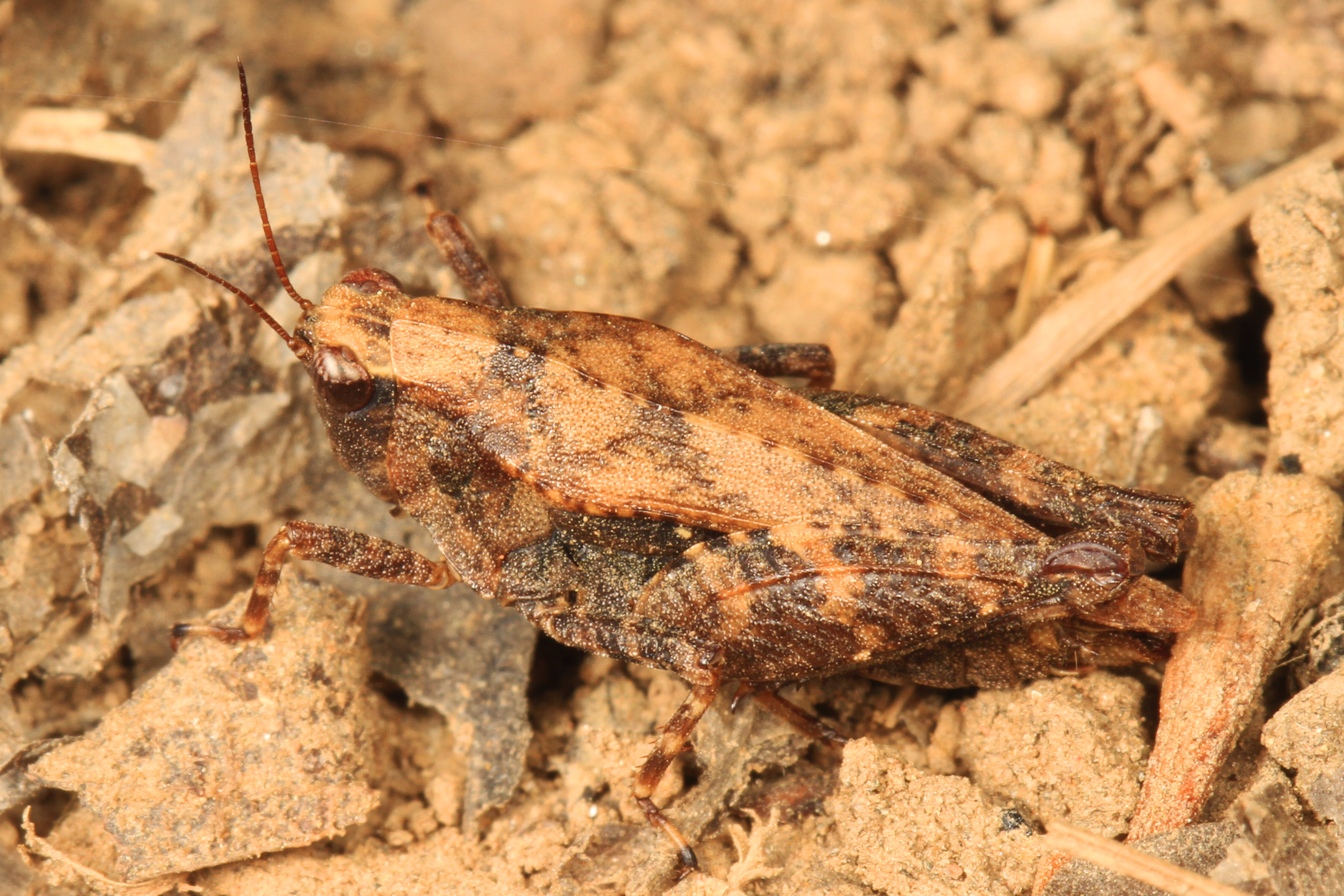
Tettigidea lateralis

== Description ==
Groudhoppers in this subfamily are characterised by having antennae consisting of 18-22 segments (other Tetrigidae have less than 16).

== Genera ==
About 25 genera in three tribes belong to the subfamily Batrachideinae:

=== Batrachideini ===
Auth. Bolívar, 1887 - Americas

- Batrachidea Serville, 1838^{c g}
- Cranotettix Grant, 1955^{c g}
- Danatettix Thomas, Skejo & Heads, 2019
- Eutettigidea Hancock, 1914^{c g}
- Halmatettix Hancock, 1909^{c g}
- Lophoscirtus Bruner, 1910^{c g}
- Paurotarsus Hancock, 1900^{c g}
- Paxilla Bolívar, 1887^{i c g}
- Plectronotus Morse, 1900^{c g}
- Procellator Kasalo, Skejo & Cambra, 2023^{c g}
- Puiggaria Bolívar, 1887^{c g}
- Rehnidium Grant, 1956^{c g}
- Scaria Bolívar, 1887^{c g}
- Tettigidea Scudder, 1862^{i c g b}

=== Bufonidini ===
Auth. Hancock, 1907 - Australasia

- Anaselina Storozhenko, 2019
- Bufonides Bolívar, 1898^{c g}
- Hyperyboella Günther, 1938
- Paraselina Storozhenko, 2019
- Selivinga Storozhenko, 2019
- Vilma Steinmann, 1973^{c g}
- Vingselina Sjöstedt, 1921^{c g}

=== Cassitettigini ===
Auth. Yin, 1984 - Africa, tropical Asia

- Ascetotettix Grant, 1956^{c g}
- Palaioscaria Günther, 1936^{c g}
- Phloeonotus Bolívar, 1887^{c g}
- Saussurella Bolívar, 1887^{c g}
- Wiemersiella Tumbrinck, 2014^{c g}

Data sources: i = ITIS, c = Catalogue of Life, g = GBIF, b = Bugguide.net
