= List of Exoprosopa species =

These 372 species belong to Exoprosopa, a genus of bee flies in the family Bombyliidae.

== Exoprosopa species ==
- Exoprosopa aberrans Paramonov, 1928^{c g}
- Exoprosopa abjecta Nurse, 1922^{c g}
- Exoprosopa abrogata Nurse, 1922^{c g}
- Exoprosopa acrospila Bezzi, 1923^{c g}
- Exoprosopa actites Painter, 1969^{i c g}
- Exoprosopa affinissima Senior-White, 1924^{c g}
- Exoprosopa agassizii Loew, 1869^{i c g b}
- Exoprosopa ahtamara Dils & Hikmet, 2007^{c g}
- Exoprosopa albata Bezzi, 1924^{c g}
- Exoprosopa albicollaris Painter, 1962^{i c g}
- Exoprosopa albida (Walker, 1852)^{c g}
- Exoprosopa albifrons Curran, 1930^{i c g b}
- Exoprosopa albofimbriata Bezzi, 1924^{c g}
- Exoprosopa aldabrae Greathead, 1976^{c g}
- Exoprosopa alexon (Walker, 1849)^{c g}
- Exoprosopa allothyris Bezzi, 1920^{c g}
- Exoprosopa altaica Paramonov, 1925^{c g}
- Exoprosopa ammophila Paramonov, 1931^{c g}
- Exoprosopa amseli Oldroyd, 1961^{c g}
- Exoprosopa ancilla Bezzi, 1924^{c g}
- Exoprosopa andamanica Pal, 1991^{c g}
- Exoprosopa angusta Bezzi, 1924^{c g}
- Exoprosopa annandalei Brunetti, 1909^{c g}
- Exoprosopa anomala Painter, 1934^{i c g b}
- Exoprosopa anthracoidea Jaennicke, 1867^{c g}
- Exoprosopa antica (Walker, 1852)^{c g}
- Exoprosopa aphelosticta Hesse, 1956^{c g}
- Exoprosopa apiformis Hesse, 1956^{c g}
- Exoprosopa arcuata Macquart, 1847^{c g}
- Exoprosopa arenicola Johnson and Johnson, 1959^{i c g}
- Exoprosopa argentifasciata Macquart, 1846^{i c g b}
- Exoprosopa argentifrons Macquart, 1855^{c g}
- Exoprosopa argyrophora Bezzi, 1912^{c g}
- Exoprosopa asiatica Zaitzev, 1972^{c g}
- Exoprosopa asiris Greathead, 1980^{c g}
- Exoprosopa atrata Hesse, 1956^{c g}
- Exoprosopa atrinasis Speiser, 1910^{c g}
- Exoprosopa atripes Cole, 1923^{i c g}
- Exoprosopa atrisquama Hesse, 1956^{c g}
- Exoprosopa aureola Francois, 1967^{c g}
- Exoprosopa auriplena (Walker, 1852)^{c g}
- Exoprosopa aurivestrix Francois, 1962^{c g}
- Exoprosopa aurulans Bezzi, 1924^{c g}
- Exoprosopa aztec Painter, 1969^{i c g}
- Exoprosopa baccha Loew, 1869^{c g}
- Exoprosopa balioptera Loew, 1860^{c g}
- Exoprosopa bangalorensis Zaitzev, 1987^{c g}
- Exoprosopa barnardi Hesse, 1956^{c g}
- Exoprosopa basifascia (Walker, 1849)^{c g}
- Exoprosopa basifiascia (Walker, 1849)^{c g}
- Exoprosopa batrachoides Bezzi, 1912^{c g}
- Exoprosopa bellula Painter, 1969^{i c g}
- Exoprosopa belutschistanica Lindner, 1979^{c g}
- Exoprosopa bengalensis Macquart, 1840^{c g}
- Exoprosopa bifurca Loew, 1869^{i c g b}
- Exoprosopa biguttata (Macquart, 1834)^{c g}
- Exoprosopa bolbocera Hesse, 1956^{c g}
- Exoprosopa bowdeni Sanchez-Terron, 1989^{c g}
- Exoprosopa brachipleuralis Hesse, 1956^{c g}
- Exoprosopa brachycera Bezzi, 1924^{c g}
- Exoprosopa brahma Schiner, 1868^{c g}
- Exoprosopa brevinasis Bezzi, 1924^{c g}
- Exoprosopa brevirostris Williston, 1901^{i c g b}
- Exoprosopa brevistylata Williston, 1901^{i c g}
- Exoprosopa brunettii Zaitzev, 1987^{c g}
- Exoprosopa bucharensis Paramonov, 1929^{c g}
- Exoprosopa bulteri Johnson & Johnson, 1958^{c g}
- Exoprosopa busiris Jaennicke, 1867^{c g}
- Exoprosopa butleri Johnson & Johnson, 1959^{i c g b}
- Exoprosopa caffra (Wiedemann, 1821)^{c g}
- Exoprosopa californiae (Walker, 1852)^{i c g}
- Exoprosopa caliptera (Say, 1823)^{i c b}
- Exoprosopa callima Painter, 1969^{i c g}
- Exoprosopa capnoptera Bezzi, 1912^{c g}
- Exoprosopa capucina (Fabricius, 1781)^{c g}
- Exoprosopa castilla Painter, 1930^{c g}
- Exoprosopa celer Cole, 1916^{i c g}
- Exoprosopa cervina Bezzi, 1921^{c g}
- Exoprosopa chan Paramonov, 1928^{c g}
- Exoprosopa chionea Bezzi, 1924^{c g}
- Exoprosopa circeoides Paramonov, 1928^{c g}
- Exoprosopa claripennis Hesse, 1956^{c g}
- Exoprosopa clarki Curran, 1930^{i c g b}
- Exoprosopa clausina Bezzi, 1924^{c g}
- Exoprosopa cleomene Egger, 1859^{c g}
- Exoprosopa collaris (Wiedemann, 1828)^{c g}
- Exoprosopa conochila Bezzi, 1924^{c g}
- Exoprosopa contorta Bezzi, 1924^{c g}
- Exoprosopa convexa (Walker, 1857)^{c g}
- Exoprosopa costalis Macquart, 1846^{c g}
- Exoprosopa cracens Painter, 1969^{i c g}
- Exoprosopa cubana Loew, 1869^{i c g}
- Exoprosopa curvicornis Bezzi, 1924^{c g}
- Exoprosopa damarensis Hesse, 1956^{c g}
- Exoprosopa decastroi Hesse, 1950^{c g}
- Exoprosopa decipiens Bezzi, 1924^{c g}
- Exoprosopa decolor Bezzi, 1924^{c g}
- Exoprosopa decora Loew, 1869^{i c g b}
- Exoprosopa decrepita (Wiedemann, 1828)^{c g}
- Exoprosopa dedecor Loew, 1871^{c g}
- Exoprosopa dedecoroides Paramonov, 1928^{c g}
- Exoprosopa delicata Greathead, 1967^{c g}
- Exoprosopa dichotoma (Schiner, 1868)^{c}
- Exoprosopa didesma Hesse, 1956^{c g}
- Exoprosopa diluta Bezzi, 1924^{c g}
- Exoprosopa dimidiata Macquart, 1846^{c g}
- Exoprosopa discriminata Bezzi, 1912^{c g}
- Exoprosopa disrupta Walker, 1871^{c g}
- Exoprosopa divisa (Coquillett, 1887)^{i c g b}
- Exoprosopa dodrans Osten Sacken, 1877^{i c g b}
- Exoprosopa dodrina Curran, 1930^{i c g b}
- Exoprosopa dorcadion Osten Sacken, 1877^{i c g b}
- Exoprosopa doris Osten Sacken, 1877^{i c g b}
- Exoprosopa dulcis Austen, 1936^{c g}
- Exoprosopa dux (Wiedemann, 1828)^{c g}
- Exoprosopa eclipis Bezzi, 1924^{c g}
- Exoprosopa efflatounbeyi Paramonov, 1928^{c g}
- Exoprosopa efflatouni Bezzi, 1925^{c g}
- Exoprosopa elongata Ricardo, 1901^{c g}
- Exoprosopa eluta Loew, 1860^{c g}
- Exoprosopa empidiformis Lindner, 1979^{c g}
- Exoprosopa enigma Greathead & Evenhuis, 2001^{c g}
- Exoprosopa eremita Osten Sacken, 1877^{i c g b}
- Exoprosopa eritreae Greathead, 1967^{c g}
- Exoprosopa erronea Bezzi, 1924^{c g}
- Exoprosopa exigua Macquart, 1855^{c g}
- Exoprosopa extensa (Wulp, 1888)^{c g}
- Exoprosopa fasciata Macquart, 1840^{i c g b}
- Exoprosopa fasciolata Painter, 1969^{i c g}
- Exoprosopa fascipennis (Say, 1824)^{i c g b}
- Exoprosopa fastidiosa Bezzi, 1921^{c g}
- Exoprosopa filia Osten Sacken, 1886^{i c g}
- Exoprosopa fissicornis Bezzi, 1924^{c g}
- Exoprosopa flammea Brunetti, 1909^{c g}
- Exoprosopa flammicoma Francois, 1964^{c g}
- Exoprosopa flavicans Bezzi, 1924^{c g}
- Exoprosopa flavinervis (Macquart, 1846)^{c}
- Exoprosopa flexuosus Pal, 1991^{c g}
- Exoprosopa formosula Bezzi, 1921^{c g}
- Exoprosopa fuligosa Painter, 1969^{i c g}
- Exoprosopa fulviops Szilady, 1942^{c g}
- Exoprosopa fumosa Cresson, 1919^{i c g b}
- Exoprosopa fuscescens Bezzi, 1924^{c g}
- Exoprosopa fuscula Bezzi, 1924^{c g}
- Exoprosopa gazophylax (Loew, 1869)^{c g}
- Exoprosopa gentilis Bezzi, 1924^{c g}
- Exoprosopa ghilarovi Zaitzev, 1988^{c g}
- Exoprosopa glossops Greathead, 2001^{c g}
- Exoprosopa goliath Bezzi, 1924^{c g}
- Exoprosopa gracilis Greathead, 2006^{c g}
- Exoprosopa grandis (Wiedemann in Meigen, 1820)^{c g}
- Exoprosopa griqua Hesse, 1956^{c g}
- Exoprosopa grisecens Bezzi, 1924^{c g}
- Exoprosopa grisescens Bezzi, 1924^{g}
- Exoprosopa guerini (Macquart, 1846)^{c g}
- Exoprosopa gujaratica Nurse, 1922^{c g}
- Exoprosopa heros (Wiedemann, 1819)^{c g}
- Exoprosopa heterocera Bezzi, 1912^{c g}
- Exoprosopa hulli Painter, 1930^{i c g}
- Exoprosopa hyalinipennis Cole, 1923^{c g}
- Exoprosopa hyalipennis Cole, 1923^{i c g}
- Exoprosopa hyalodisca Bezzi, 1923^{c g}
- Exoprosopa hyaloptera Hesse, 1956^{c g}
- Exoprosopa hypargyra Bezzi, 1921^{c g}
- Exoprosopa hypargyroides Hesse, 1956^{c g}
- Exoprosopa hypomelaena Bezzi, 1912^{c g}
- Exoprosopa ignifera (Walker, 1849)^{c}
- Exoprosopa inaequalipes Loew, 1852^{c g}
- Exoprosopa indecisa (Walker, 1849)^{c g}
- Exoprosopa infumata Bezzi, 1921^{c g}
- Exoprosopa ingens Cresson, 1919^{i c g b}
- Exoprosopa inornata Loew, 1860^{c g}
- Exoprosopa insignifera Evenhuis & Greathead, 1999^{c g}
- Exoprosopa insulata (Walker, 1852)^{c g}
- Exoprosopa interrupta (Wiedemann, 1828)^{c}
- Exoprosopa iota Osten Sacken, 1886^{i c g b}
- Exoprosopa italica (Rossi, 1794)^{c g}
- Exoprosopa jacchus (Fabricius, 1805)^{c g}
- Exoprosopa jonesi Cresson, 1919^{i c g b}
- Exoprosopa jubatipes Hesse, 1956^{c g}
- Exoprosopa junta Curran, 1930^{i c g}
- Exoprosopa khuzistanica Lindner, 1979^{c g}
- Exoprosopa lankiensis Zaitzev, 1988^{c g}
- Exoprosopa latifrons Bezzi, 1924^{c g}
- Exoprosopa latissima Bezzi, 1924^{c g}
- Exoprosopa leon Painter, 1969^{i c g}
- Exoprosopa lepida Painter, 1969^{i c g}
- Exoprosopa leucopepla Bowden, 1964^{c g}
- Exoprosopa linearis Bezzi, 1924^{c g}
- Exoprosopa litoralis Hesse, 1956^{c g}
- Exoprosopa litorrhynchoides Francois, 1962^{c g}
- Exoprosopa louisae Francois, 1962^{c g}
- Exoprosopa lucidifrons Becker & Stein, 1913^{c g}
- Exoprosopa luctifera Bezzi, 1912^{c g}
- Exoprosopa lugens Paramonov, 1928^{c g}
- Exoprosopa lunulata Bowden, 1964^{c g}
- Exoprosopa luteicincta Hesse, 1956^{c g}
- Exoprosopa luteicosta Bezzi, 1921^{c g}
- Exoprosopa luteocera Hesse, 1956^{c g}
- Exoprosopa lutzi Curran, 1930^{i c g}
- Exoprosopa mackieae Paramonov, 1955^{c g}
- Exoprosopa madagascariensis Macquart, 1850^{c g}
- Exoprosopa maenas Loew, 1869^{c g}
- Exoprosopa magnipennis Bezzi, 1924^{c g}
- Exoprosopa major Ricardo, 1901^{c g}
- Exoprosopa majuscula Hesse, 1956^{c g}
- Exoprosopa mara (Walker, 1849)^{c g}
- Exoprosopa marleyi Hesse, 1956^{c g}
- Exoprosopa masienensis Hesse, 1950^{c g}
- Exoprosopa megaera (Wiedemann in Meigen, 1820)^{c g}
- Exoprosopa meigenii (Wiedemann, 1828)^{i c g b}
- Exoprosopa melaena Loew, 1874^{c g}
- Exoprosopa melanaspis Bezzi, 1924^{c g}
- Exoprosopa melanozona Hesse, 1956^{c g}
- Exoprosopa melanthia Hesse, 1956^{c g}
- Exoprosopa metapleuralis Hesse, 1956^{c g}
- Exoprosopa metopargyra Hesse, 1956^{c g}
- Exoprosopa mimetica Hesse, 1956^{c g}
- Exoprosopa minoana Paramonov, 1928^{c g}
- Exoprosopa minoides Paramonov, 1928^{c g}
- Exoprosopa minois Loew, 1869^{c g}
- Exoprosopa minos (Meigen, 1804)^{c g}
- Exoprosopa minuscula Painter, 1969^{i c g}
- Exoprosopa mira Hesse, 1936^{c g}
- Exoprosopa mongolica Paramonov, 1928^{c g}
- Exoprosopa monticola Hesse, 1956^{c g}
- Exoprosopa morosa Loew, 1860^{c g}
- Exoprosopa mozambica Hesse, 1956^{c g}
- Exoprosopa mudigerensis Zaitzev, 1987^{c g}
- Exoprosopa munda Loew, 1869^{c g}
- Exoprosopa mus Curran, 1930^{i c g}
- Exoprosopa nebulosa Hesse, 1956^{c g}
- Exoprosopa nemesis (Fabricius, 1805)^{c g}
- Exoprosopa nigrifera Walker, 1871^{c g}
- Exoprosopa nigrifimbriata Hesse, 1956^{c g}
- Exoprosopa nigrina Bezzi, 1924^{c g}
- Exoprosopa nigrispina Bezzi, 1924^{c g}
- Exoprosopa nigrita (Fabricius, 1775)^{c g}
- Exoprosopa nigritella Bezzi, 1924^{c g}
- Exoprosopa nigroventris Painter, 1969^{c g}
- Exoprosopa niveiventris Brunetti, 1909^{c g}
- Exoprosopa noctula (Wiedemann, 1830)^{i c g}
- Exoprosopa nonna Becker & Stein, 1913^{c g}
- Exoprosopa nova Ricardo, 1910^{c g}
- Exoprosopa novaeformis Bezzi, 1924^{c g}
- Exoprosopa nubifera Loew, 1869^{c g}
- Exoprosopa nuragasana Hesse, 1956^{c g}
- Exoprosopa obscurinotata Hesse, 1956^{c g}
- Exoprosopa obtusa Bezzi, 1924^{c g}
- Exoprosopa ogilviei Hesse, 1956^{c g}
- Exoprosopa onusta (Walker, 1852)^{c g}
- Exoprosopa orientalis Bezzi, 1924^{c g}
- Exoprosopa ovamboana Hesse, 1956^{c g}
- Exoprosopa painterorum Johnson & Johnson, 1960^{i c g b}
- Exoprosopa pallasii (Wiedemann, 1818)^{c g}
- Exoprosopa pallida Bezzi, 1924^{c g}
- Exoprosopa pallidifacies Hesse, 1956^{c g}
- Exoprosopa pallidipes Hesse, 1956^{c g}
- Exoprosopa pallidisetigera Austen, 1937^{c g}
- Exoprosopa palustris Bezzi, 1924^{c g}
- Exoprosopa panamensis Curran, 1930^{c g}
- Exoprosopa pandora (Fabricius, 1805)^{c g}
- Exoprosopa paramonovi Evenhuis, 1978^{c g}
- Exoprosopa parda Osten Sacken, 1886^{c g b}
- Exoprosopa pardus Osten Sacken, 1886^{i c}
- Exoprosopa paucispina Hesse, 1956^{c g}
- Exoprosopa pauper Walker, 1871^{c g}
- Exoprosopa pavida Williston, 1901^{i c g}
- Exoprosopa pectoralis Loew, 1862^{c g}
- Exoprosopa pelurga Bowden, 1964^{c g}
- Exoprosopa pennata Nurse, 1922^{c g}
- Exoprosopa penthoptera Bezzi, 1912^{c g}
- Exoprosopa perpulchra Bezzi, 1921^{c g}
- Exoprosopa pharaonis Paramonov, 1928^{c g}
- Exoprosopa pictillipennis Austen, 1936^{c g}
- Exoprosopa pilatei (Macquart, 1846)^{c}
- Exoprosopa pleroxantha Hesse, 1936^{c g}
- Exoprosopa pleskei Paramonov, 1928^{c g}
- Exoprosopa porricella Hesse, 1956^{c g}
- Exoprosopa portshinskiji Paramonov, 1928^{c g}
- Exoprosopa povolnyi Zaitzev, 1977^{c g}
- Exoprosopa praefica Loew, 1860^{c g}
- Exoprosopa procne Osten Sacken, 1886^{c g}
- Exoprosopa prometheus (Macquart, 1855)^{c}
- Exoprosopa protuberans Bezzi, 1924^{c g}
- Exoprosopa pterosticha Hesse, 1936^{c g}
- Exoprosopa pueblensis Jaennicke, 1867^{i c g b}
- Exoprosopa puerula Brunetti, 1920^{c g}
- Exoprosopa pulcherrima Paramonov, 1928^{c g}
- Exoprosopa pullata Zaitzev, 1976^{c g}
- Exoprosopa punctifrons Bezzi, 1924^{c g}
- Exoprosopa punctulata Macquart, 1840^{c g}
- Exoprosopa punjabensis Nurse, 1922^{c g}
- Exoprosopa pusilla Macquart, 1840^{c g}
- Exoprosopa rectifascia Bezzi, 1924^{c g}
- Exoprosopa referta Bezzi, 1924^{c g}
- Exoprosopa restricta Bezzi, 1924^{c g}
- Exoprosopa retracta Bezzi, 1924^{c g}
- Exoprosopa retrorsa Brunetti, 1909^{c g}
- Exoprosopa rhea Osten Sacken, 1886^{i c g b}
- Exoprosopa rhodesiensis Hesse, 1956^{c g}
- Exoprosopa richteri Lindner, 1979^{c g}
- Exoprosopa robertii Macquart, 1840^{c g}
- Exoprosopa rostrifera Jaennicke, 1867^{i c g b}
- Exoprosopa rubescens Bezzi, 1924^{c g}
- Exoprosopa rufa Painter, 1962^{i c g}
- Exoprosopa rufina Bezzi, 1924^{c g}
- Exoprosopa rutila (Pallas & Wiedemann, 1818)^{c g}
- Exoprosopa rutiloides Bezzi, 1924^{c g}
- Exoprosopa sackeni Williston, 1901^{i c g}
- Exoprosopa sanctipauli Macquart, 1840^{c g}
- Exoprosopa scaligera Bezzi, 1912^{c g}
- Exoprosopa schmidti Karsch, 1888^{c g}
- Exoprosopa scutellata Bhalla, 1991^{c g}
- Exoprosopa selenops Greathead, 2001^{c g}
- Exoprosopa senegalensis Macquart, 1840^{c g}
- Exoprosopa serva Bezzi, 1924^{c g}
- Exoprosopa sharonae Johnson and Johnson, 1959^{i c g}
- Exoprosopa sigmoidea Bezzi, 1912^{c g}
- Exoprosopa sima Osten Sacken, 1877^{i c g}
- Exoprosopa simillima Hesse, 1956^{c g}
- Exoprosopa simpsoni Bowden, 1964^{c g}
- Exoprosopa siva Nurse, 1922^{c g}
- Exoprosopa socia Osten Sacken, 1886^{i c g}
- Exoprosopa sola Painter, 1939^{c g}
- Exoprosopa sordida Loew, 1869^{i c g}
- Exoprosopa spadix Painter, 1933^{c g}
- Exoprosopa spectrum Speiser, 1910^{c g}
- Exoprosopa stackelbergi Zaitzev, 1972^{c g}
- Exoprosopa stannusi Bezzi, 1912^{c g}
- Exoprosopa stenomelaena Bezzi, 1924^{c g}
- Exoprosopa stevensoni Hesse, 1956^{c g}
- Exoprosopa strenua Loew, 1860^{c g}
- Exoprosopa stylata Brunetti, 1920^{c g}
- Exoprosopa subfascia (Walker, 1849)^{c g}
- Exoprosopa tabanoides Bezzi, 1924^{c g}
- Exoprosopa tamerlan Portschinsky, 1887^{c g}
- Exoprosopa tarikerensis Zaitzev, 1987^{c g}
- Exoprosopa temnocera Bezzi, 1924^{c g}
- Exoprosopa texana Curran, 1930^{i c g}
- Exoprosopa thomae Fabricius, 1805^{c g}
- Exoprosopa thoracica Bezzi, 1924^{c g}
- Exoprosopa tiburonensis Cole, 1923^{i c g}
- Exoprosopa tihamae Greathead, 1980^{c g}
- Exoprosopa titubans Osten Sacken, 1877^{i c g}
- Exoprosopa transcaspica Evenhuis, 1978^{c g}
- Exoprosopa tricolor Macquart, 1840^{c g}
- Exoprosopa trigradata Hesse, 1956^{c g}
- Exoprosopa triloculina Hesse, 1956^{c g}
- Exoprosopa tripartita Hesse, 1956^{c g}
- Exoprosopa triplex Bezzi, 1924^{c g}
- Exoprosopa truquii Rondani, 1863^{c g}
- Exoprosopa tuckeri Bezzi, 1921^{c g}
- Exoprosopa turkestanica Paramonov, 1925^{c g}
- Exoprosopa tursonovi Zaitzev, 1988^{c g}
- Exoprosopa tursunovi Zaitzev, 1988^{c g}
- Exoprosopa unifasciata Ricardo, 1901^{c g}
- Exoprosopa uraguayi Macquart, 1840^{c g}
- Exoprosopa utahensis Johnson and Johnson, 1959^{i c g}
- Exoprosopa varicolor Macquart, 1846^{c g}
- Exoprosopa vassilijevi Paramonov, 1928^{c g}
- Exoprosopa vayssierei Seguy, 1934^{c g}
- Exoprosopa venosa (Wiedemann, 1819)^{c g}
- Exoprosopa villaeformis Bezzi, 1912^{c g}
- Exoprosopa villosa Bezzi, 1924^{c g}
- Exoprosopa virgata Bowden, 1964^{c g}
- Exoprosopa vumbuensis Hesse, 1956^{c g}
- Exoprosopa xanthina Painter, 1934^{i c g}
- Exoprosopa zambesiana Hesse, 1956^{c g}
- Exoprosopa zanoni Bezzi, 1922^{c g}
- Exoprosopa zarudnyji Paramonov, 1928^{c g}
- Exoprosopa zimini Paramonov, 1929^{c g}

Data sources: i = ITIS, c = Catalogue of Life, g = GBIF, b = Bugguide.net
