= Exoprosopa dorcadion =

Scientific classification
- Domain: Eukaryota
- Kingdom: Animalia
- Phylum: Arthropoda
- Class: Insecta
- Order: Diptera
- Family: Bombyliidae
- Genus: Exoprosopa
- Species: E. dorcadion

Binomial name
- Exoprosopa dorcadion Osten Sacken, 1877

Species of fly

Exoprosopa dorcadion is a species of bee fly in the family Bombyliidae. It is widespread in North America.

== Similar species ==
On the wing of Exoprosopa dorcadion, the black mark on its leading edge near the wingtip ends before the outermost vein. The mark on Exoprosopa caliptera extends to outermost vein. The wing trailing edge of Exoprosopa divisa, Exoprosopa doris, and Exoprosopa eremita is clear.
