= Exoprosopa anomala =

Scientific classification
- Domain: Eukaryota
- Kingdom: Animalia
- Phylum: Arthropoda
- Class: Insecta
- Order: Diptera
- Family: Bombyliidae
- Tribe: Exoprosopini
- Genus: Exoprosopa
- Species: E. anomala

Binomial name
- Exoprosopa anomala Painter, 1934

Species of fly

Exoprosopa anomala is a species of bee fly in the family Bombyliidae.
