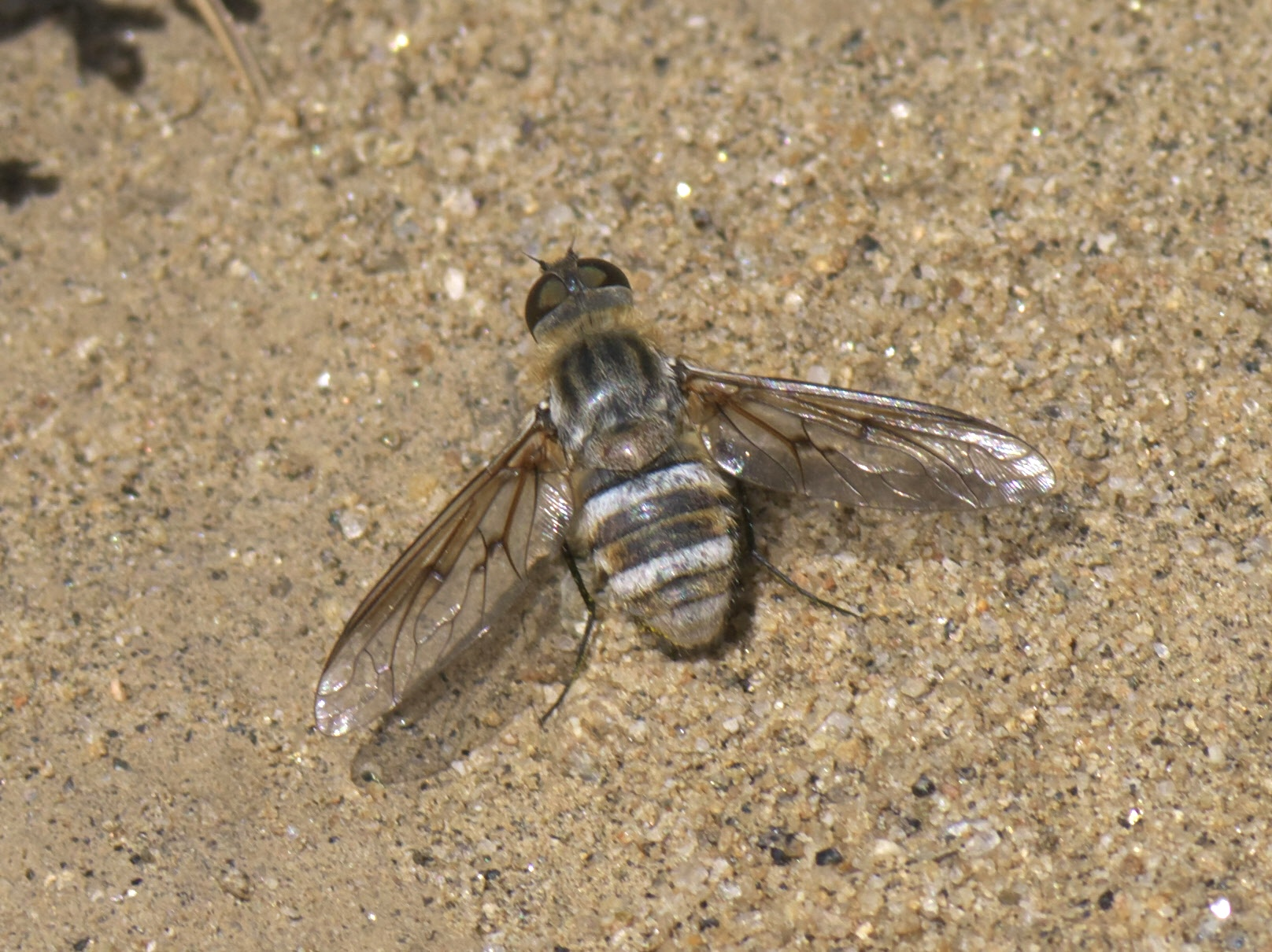
- Exoprosopa agassizii, New Mexico

Scientific classification
- Domain: Eukaryota
- Kingdom: Animalia
- Phylum: Arthropoda
- Class: Insecta
- Order: Diptera
- Family: Bombyliidae
- Tribe: Exoprosopini
- Genus: Exoprosopa
- Species: E. agassizii

Binomial name
- Exoprosopa agassizii Loew, 1869

= Exoprosopa agassizii =

Species of fly

Exoprosopa agassizii is a species of bee fly in the genus Exoprosopa, and the family Bombyliidae. It was first discovered by Friedrich Hermann Loew in 1869.
