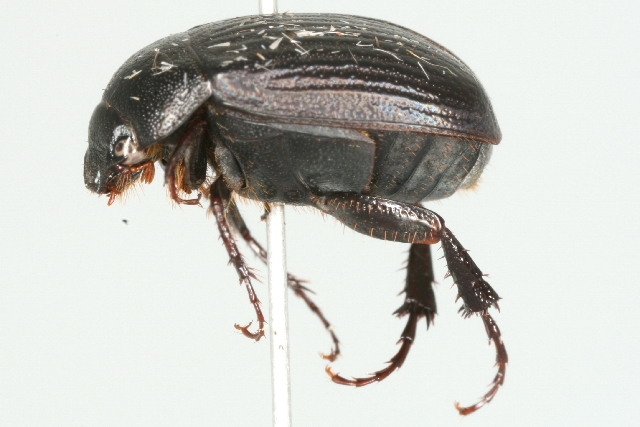

Scientific classification
- Kingdom: Animalia
- Phylum: Arthropoda
- Class: Insecta
- Order: Coleoptera
- Suborder: Polyphaga
- Infraorder: Scarabaeiformia
- Family: Scarabaeidae
- Genus: Serica
- Species: S. tristis

Binomial name
- Serica tristis LeConte, 1850

= Serica tristis =

Species of beetle

Serica tristis is a species of May beetle or junebug in the family Scarabaeidae. It is found in North America (Manitoba, New Brunswick, Nova Scotia, Ontario, Prince Edward Island, Quebec, Illinois, Maine, Massachusetts, Minnesota, New Hamsphire, New York, Wisconsin).

== Description ==
Adults reach a length of about 7–8.5 mm. The colour varies from chestnut to nearly black. The surface is moderately shining with a metallic, iridescent sheen.
