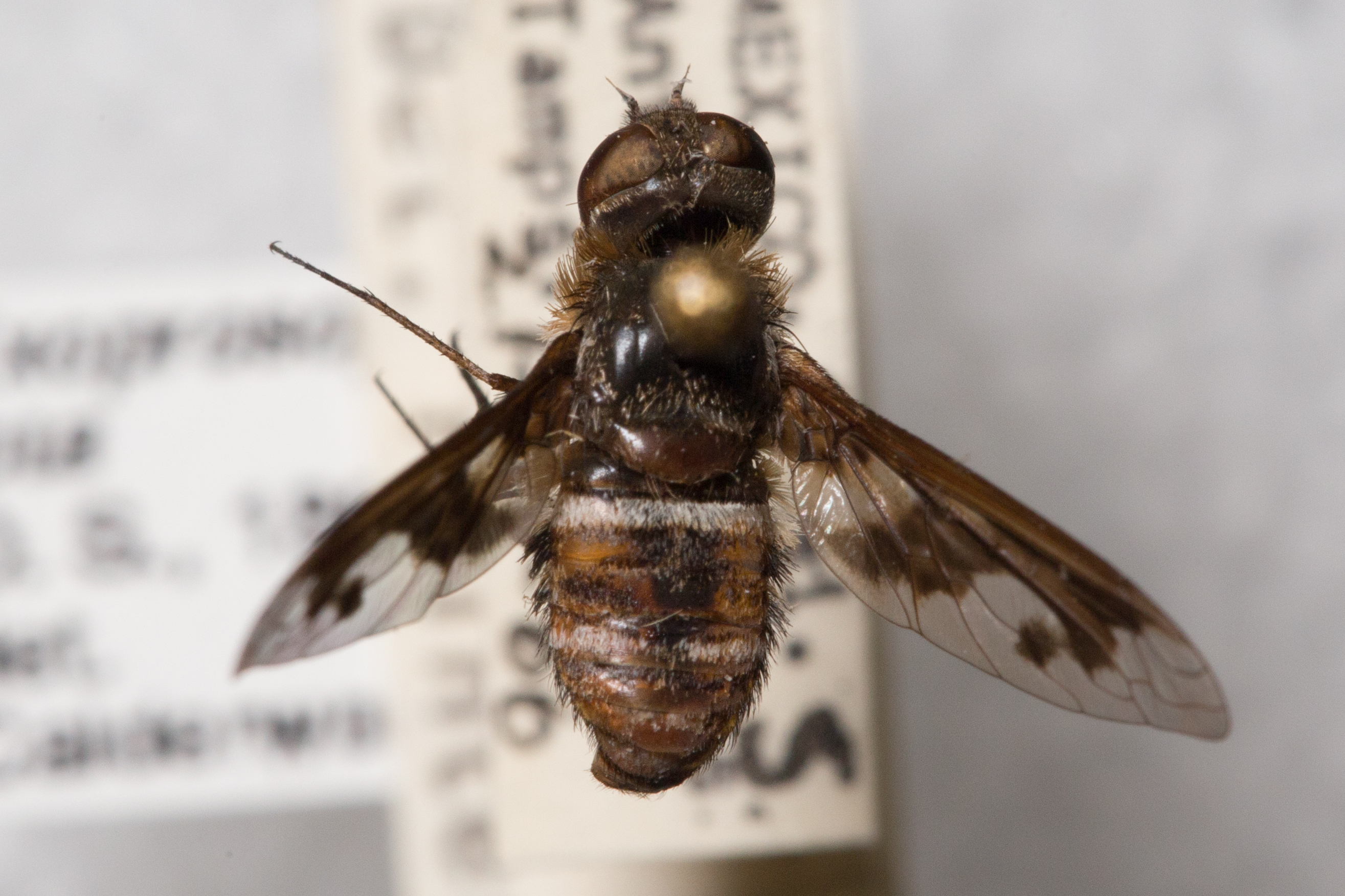
- Specimen in the California Academy of Sciences Entomology collection, collected in Antigua, Morelos, Mexico, 1966-04-21

Scientific classification
- Domain: Eukaryota
- Kingdom: Animalia
- Phylum: Arthropoda
- Class: Insecta
- Order: Diptera
- Family: Bombyliidae
- Tribe: Exoprosopini
- Genus: Exoprosopa
- Species: E. iota

Binomial name
- Exoprosopa iota Osten Sacken, 1886

= Exoprosopa iota =

Species of fly

Exoprosopa iota is a species of bee fly in the family Bombyliidae.
