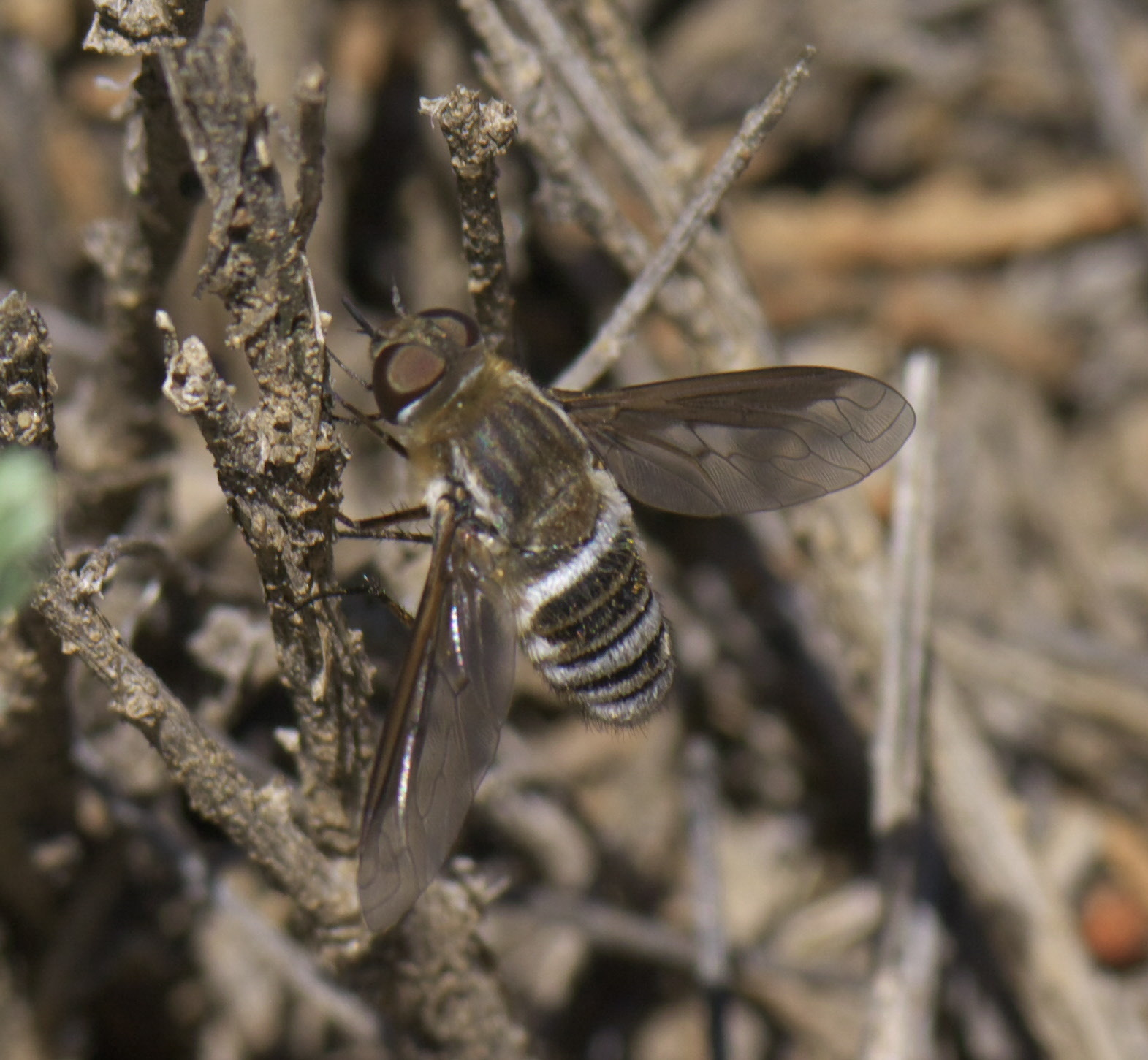
- Exoprosopa dodrans, New Mexico

Scientific classification
- Domain: Eukaryota
- Kingdom: Animalia
- Phylum: Arthropoda
- Class: Insecta
- Order: Diptera
- Family: Bombyliidae
- Tribe: Exoprosopini
- Genus: Exoprosopa
- Species: E. dodrans

Binomial name
- Exoprosopa dodrans Osten Sacken, 1877

= Exoprosopa dodrans =

Species of fly

Exoprosopa dodrans is a species of bee fly in the family Bombyliidae.
