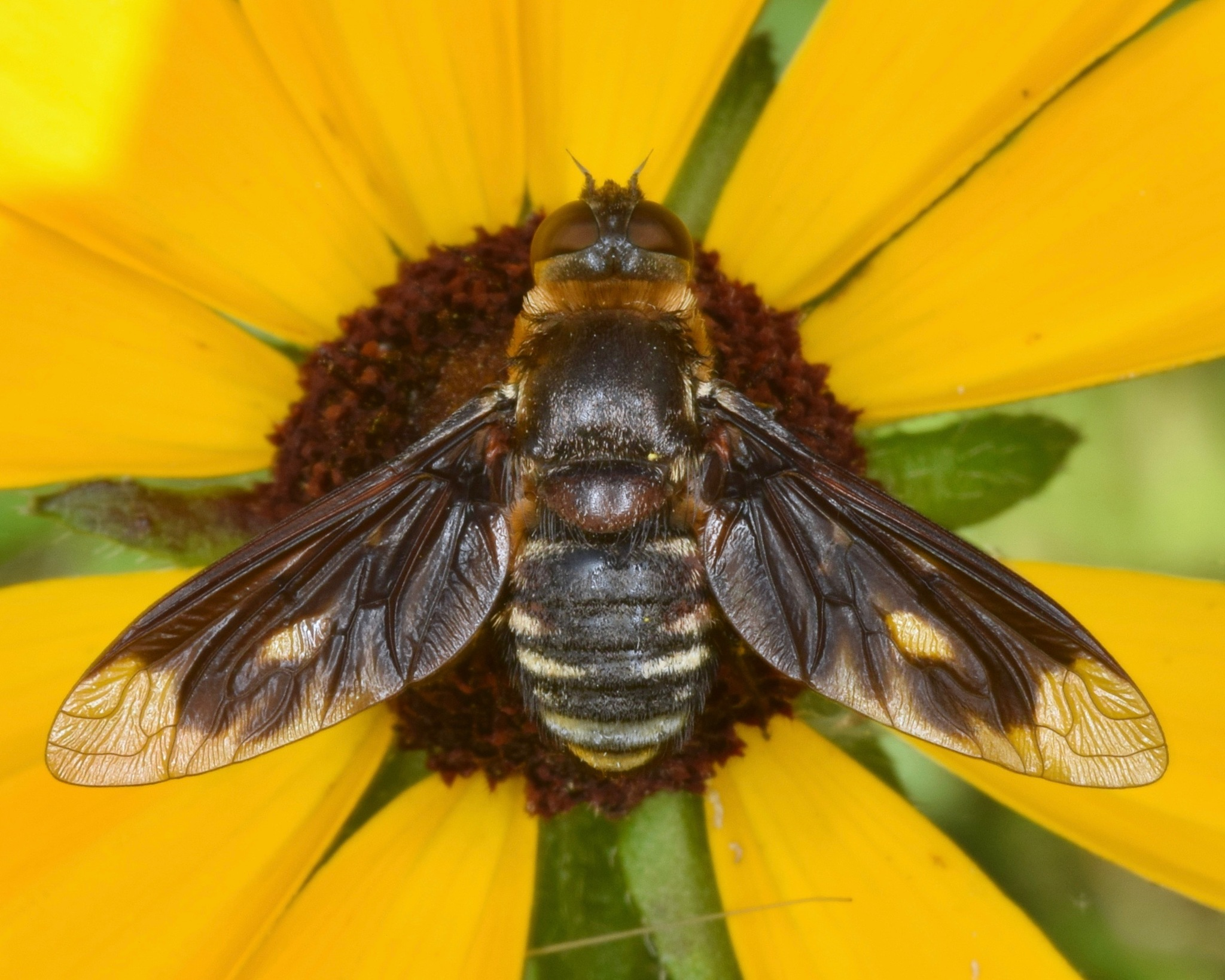

Scientific classification
- Domain: Eukaryota
- Kingdom: Animalia
- Phylum: Arthropoda
- Class: Insecta
- Order: Diptera
- Family: Bombyliidae
- Tribe: Exoprosopini
- Genus: Exoprosopa
- Species: E. meigenii

Binomial name
- Exoprosopa meigenii (Wiedemann, 1828)

Synonyms
- Anthrax meigenii Wiedemann, 1828; Exoprosopa emarginata Macquart, 1840

= Exoprosopa meigenii =

Species of fly

Exoprosopa meigenii is a species of bee fly in the family Bombyliidae.
