= Exoprosopa butleri =

Scientific classification
- Domain: Eukaryota
- Kingdom: Animalia
- Phylum: Arthropoda
- Class: Insecta
- Order: Diptera
- Family: Bombyliidae
- Tribe: Exoprosopini
- Genus: Exoprosopa
- Species: E. butleri

Binomial name
- Exoprosopa butleri Johnson & Johnson, 1959

Species of fly

Exoprosopa butleri is a species of bee fly in the family Bombyliidae.
