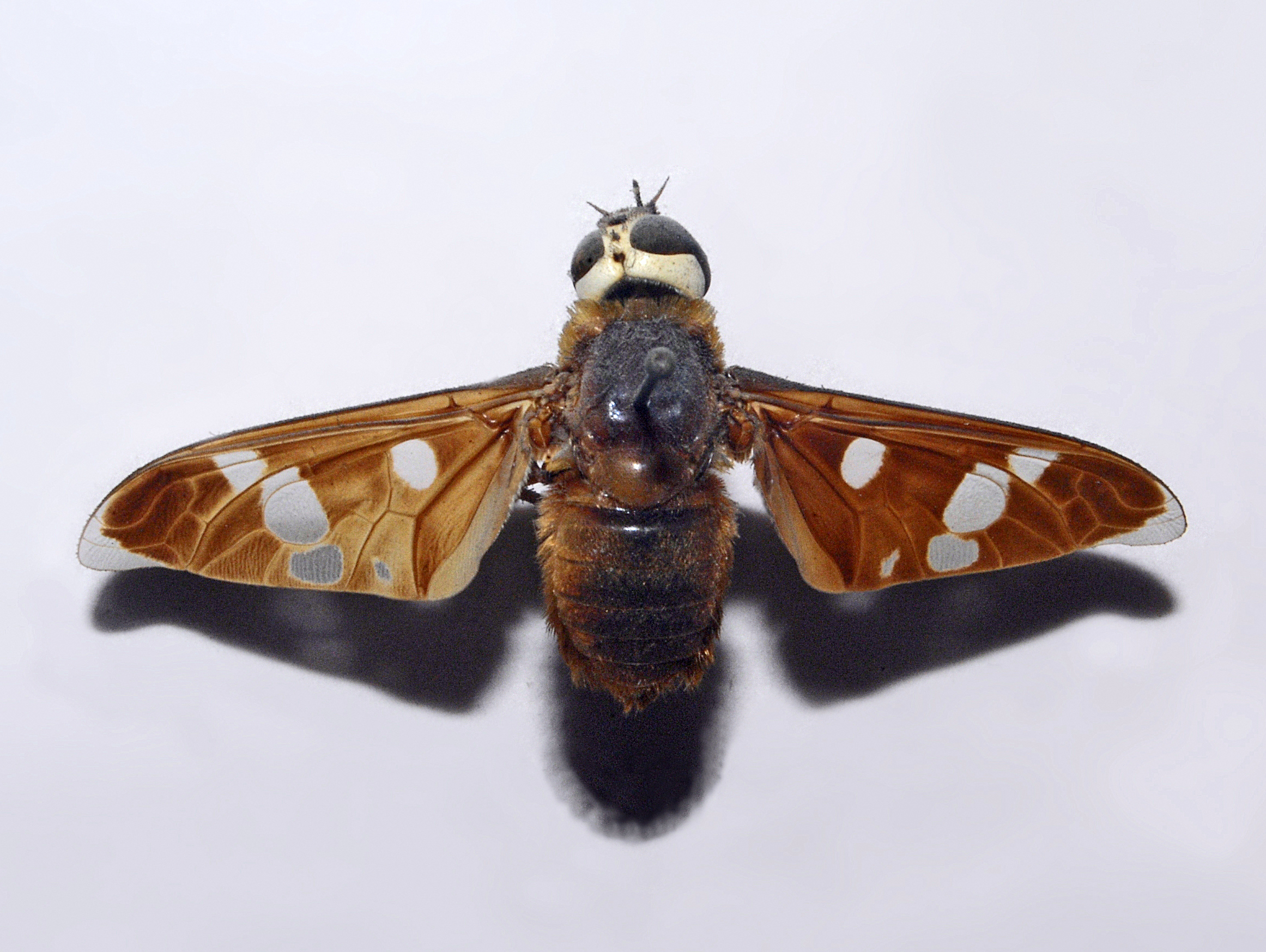
- Hyperalonia morio

Scientific classification
- Domain: Eukaryota
- Kingdom: Animalia
- Phylum: Arthropoda
- Class: Insecta
- Order: Diptera
- Family: Bombyliidae
- Subfamily: Anthracinae
- Tribe: Exoprosopini
- Genus: Hyperalonia; Rondani, 1863

Type species
- Anthrax erythrocephala Fabricius, 1805

= Hyperalonia =

Genus of flies

Hyperalonia is a genus of bee flies in the family Bombyliidae.

Hyperalonia is one of the most striking genera of bee flies that can be found in the Neotropical region. The species included in this genus have a large bluish black body with several tufts of red and white hairs, bluish black wings and a yellow head with dark blue eyes.

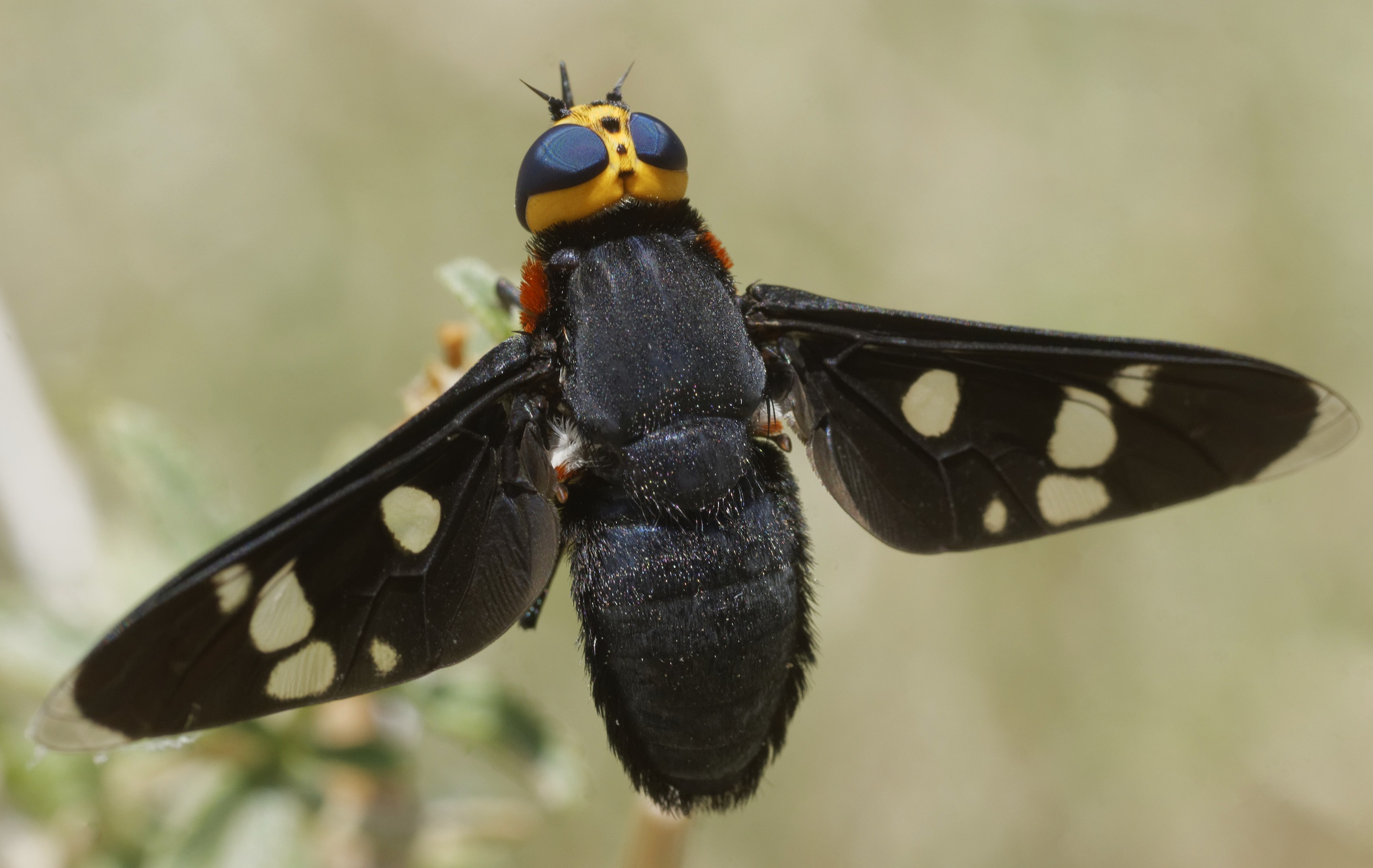
A male of Hyperalonia morio patrolling a patch of vegetation near the visitor center of Quebrada de las Higueritas in Lujan, San Luis, Argentina

== Species ==
These seven species belong to the genus Hyperalonia:

- Hyperalonia atra Painter & Painter, 1968
- Hyperalonia chilensis Rondani, 1863
- Hyperalonia coeruleiventris (Macquart, 1846)
- Hyperalonia diminuta Couri & Lamas, 1994
- Hyperalonia erythrocephala (Fabricius, 1805)
- Hyperalonia morio (Fabricius, 1775)
- Hyperalonia surinamensis Rondani, 1863
