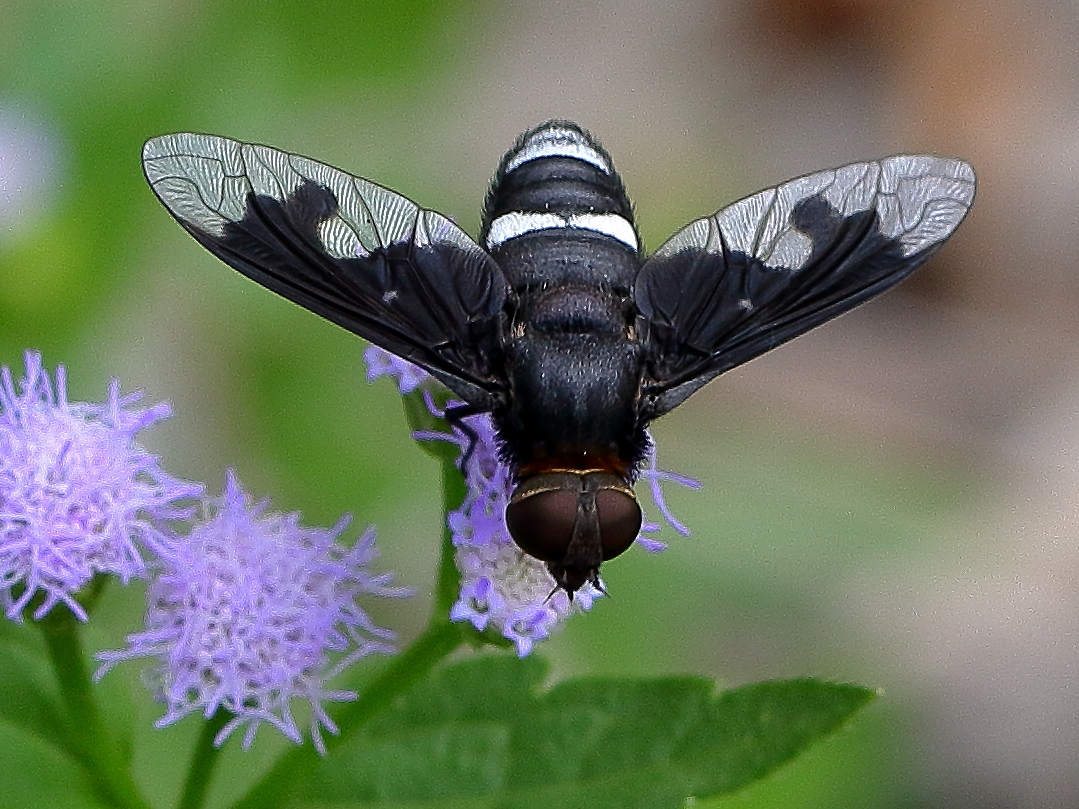
- Balaana bicuspis, Queensland, Australia

Scientific classification
- Kingdom: Animalia
- Phylum: Arthropoda
- Class: Insecta
- Order: Diptera
- Family: Bombyliidae
- Subfamily: Anthracinae
- Tribe: Exoprosopini
- Genus: Balaana; Lambkin & Yeates, 2003

Type species
- Exoprosopa latelimbata Bigot, 1892

= Balaana =

Genus of flies

Balaana is a genus of flies belonging to the family Bombyliidae (bee-flies). There are about seven described species, including three from western Australia. These are robust and very hairy flies with a body length of 10–18 mm (0.4–0.7 in).

== Species ==
These 11 species belong to the genus Balaana:

- Balaana abscondita Lambkin & Yeates, 2003
- Balaana bicuspis Lambkin & Yeates, 2003
- Balaana centrosa Lambkin & Yeates, 2003
- Balaana efflatounbeyi (Paramonov, 1928)
- Balaana gigantea Lambkin & Yeates, 2003
- Balaana grandis (Wiedemann, 1820)
- Balaana kingcascadensis Lambkin & Yeates, 2003
- Balaana latelimbata (Bigot, 1892)
- Balaana obliquebifasciata (Macquart, 1850)
- Balaana onusta (Walker, 1852)
- Balaana tamerlan (Portschinsky, 1887)
