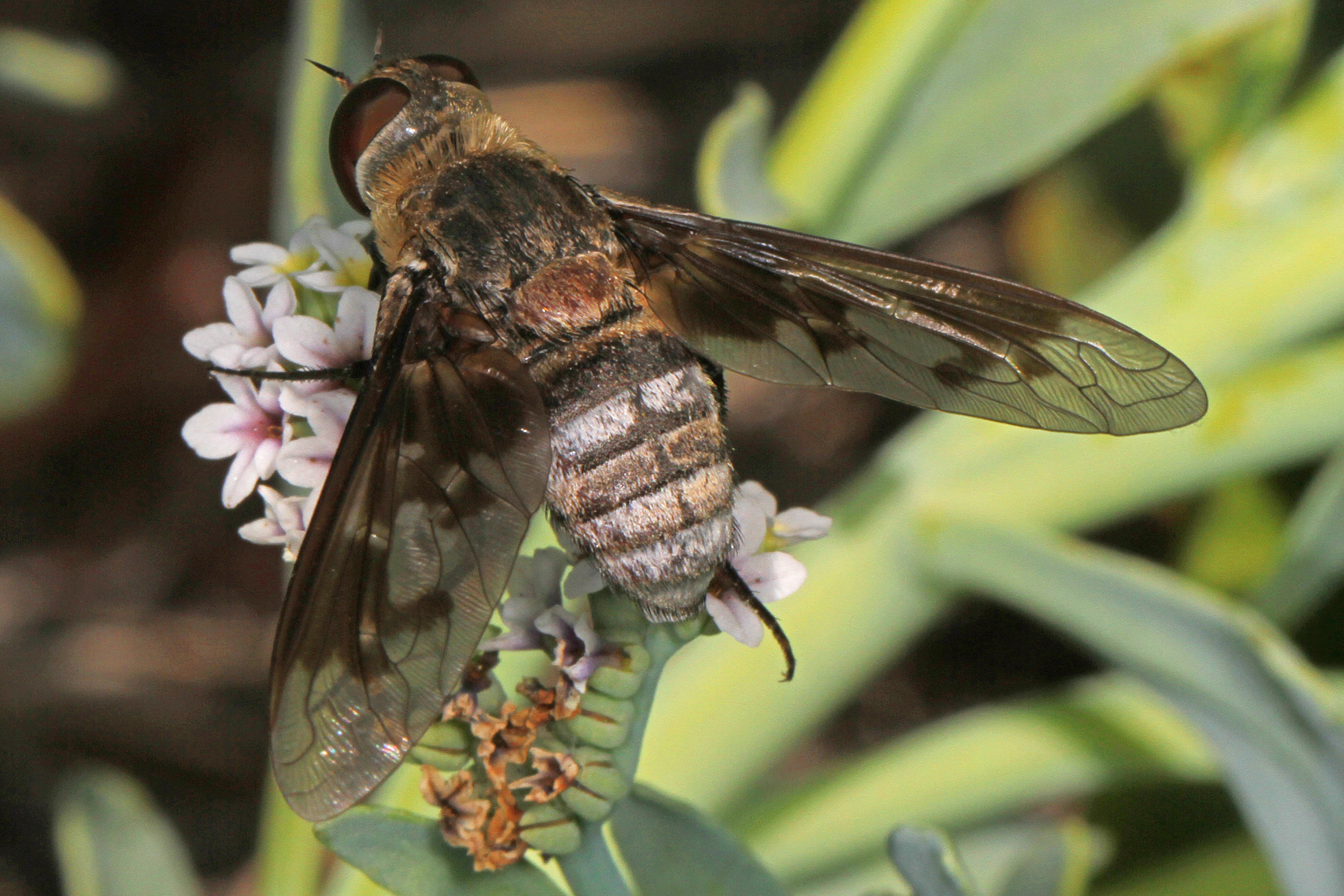

Scientific classification
- Domain: Eukaryota
- Kingdom: Animalia
- Phylum: Arthropoda
- Class: Insecta
- Order: Diptera
- Family: Bombyliidae
- Tribe: Exoprosopini
- Genus: Exoprosopa
- Species: E. divisa

Binomial name
- Exoprosopa divisa (Coquillett, 1887)

Synonyms
- Exoptata divisa Coquillett, 1887

= Exoprosopa divisa =

Species of fly

Exoprosopa divisa is a species of bee fly in the family Bombyliidae.
