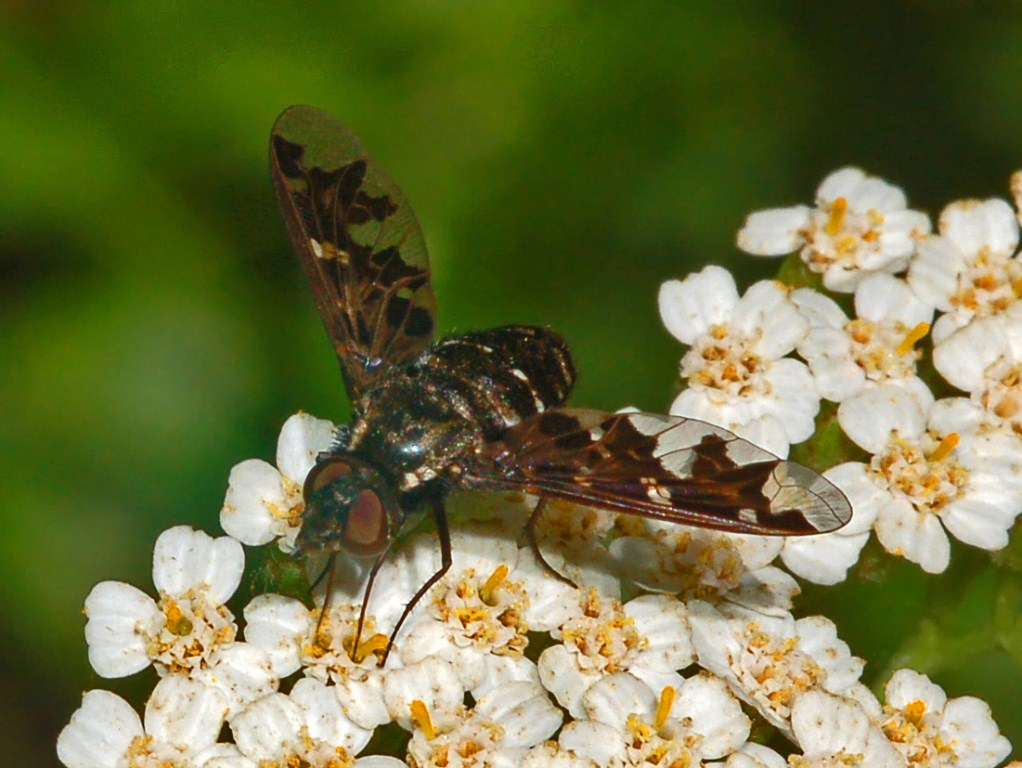

Scientific classification
- Kingdom: Animalia
- Phylum: Arthropoda
- Class: Insecta
- Order: Diptera
- Family: Bombyliidae
- Genus: Exoprosopa
- Species: E. jacchus

Binomial name
- Exoprosopa jacchus (Fabricius, 1805)

= Exoprosopa jacchus =

Species of fly

Exoprosopa jacchus is a species of bee fly belonging to the family Bombyliidae, in subfamily Anthracinae.

Commonly named the silvery bee-fly, this species is present in most of Europe.

The average body length of the adults reaches 12 millimetres (0.47 in). The head and the thorax are dark-brown. The thorax is quite hairy and marked by silvery-white scales. The abdomen is blackish with a few silver hair stripes and it is hairy on the sides. The wings are mottled light and dark-brown, with hyaline patches on the front border cell (R1). The third segment of the antennae is longer than the fourth.
