= Exoprosopa eremita =

Scientific classification
- Domain: Eukaryota
- Kingdom: Animalia
- Phylum: Arthropoda
- Class: Insecta
- Order: Diptera
- Family: Bombyliidae
- Tribe: Exoprosopini
- Genus: Exoprosopa
- Species: E. eremita

Binomial name
- Exoprosopa eremita Osten Sacken, 1877

Synonyms
- Exoprosopa grata Coquillett, 1892

Species of fly

Exoprosopa eremita is a species of bee fly in the family Bombyliidae. It occurs in western North America.
