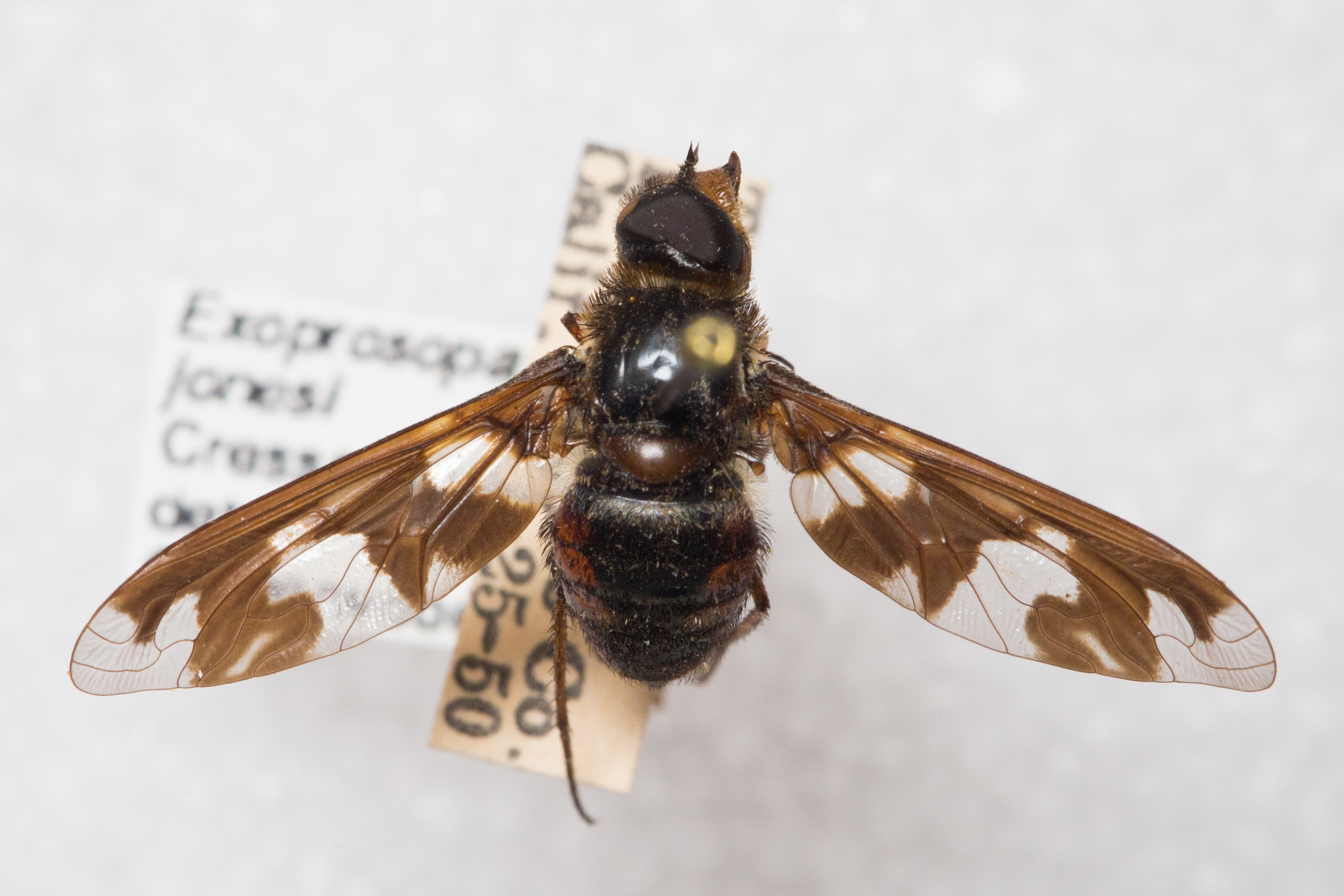
- Exoprosopa Jonesi - Specimen in the California Academy of Sciences Entomology collection, collected in Tanbark Flat, Los Angeles County,

Scientific classification
- Domain: Eukaryota
- Kingdom: Animalia
- Phylum: Arthropoda
- Class: Insecta
- Order: Diptera
- Family: Bombyliidae
- Genus: Exoprosopa
- Species: E. jonesi

Binomial name
- Exoprosopa jonesi Cresson, 1919

= Exoprosopa jonesi =

Species of fly

Exoprosopa jonesi is a species of bee fly in the family Bombyliidae.
