= Exoprosopa fumosa =

Scientific classification
- Domain: Eukaryota
- Kingdom: Animalia
- Phylum: Arthropoda
- Class: Insecta
- Order: Diptera
- Family: Bombyliidae
- Genus: Exoprosopa
- Species: E. fumosa

Binomial name
- Exoprosopa fumosa Cresson, 1919

Species of fly

Exoprosopa fumosa is a species of bee fly in the family Bombyliidae.
