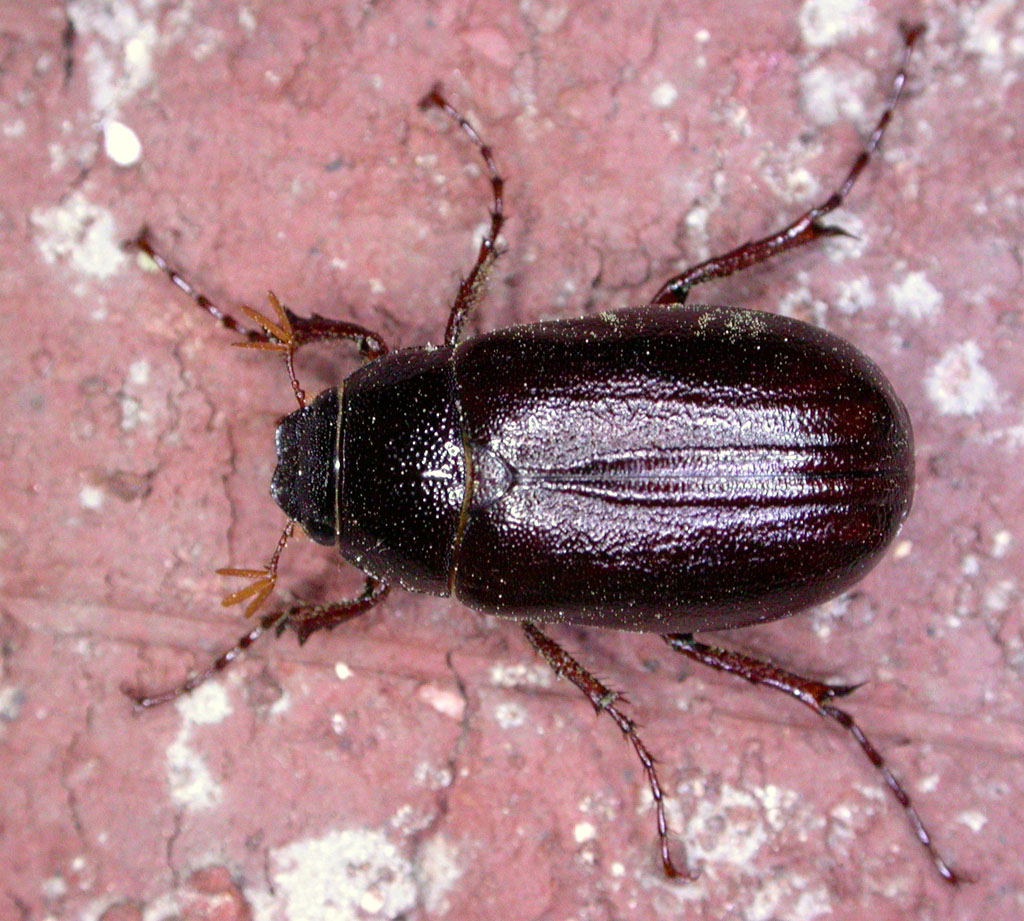
- Phyllophaga
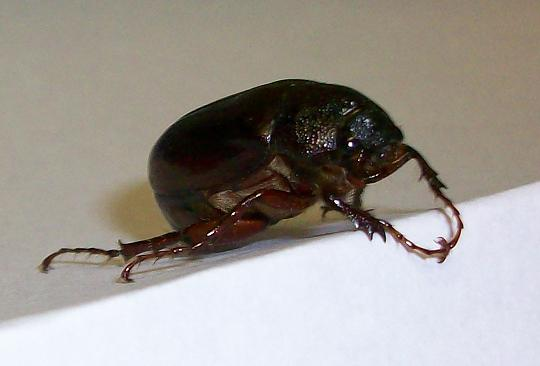
- Common Phyllophaga found in Michigan

Scientific classification
- Kingdom: Animalia
- Phylum: Arthropoda
- Clade: Pancrustacea
- Class: Insecta
- Order: Coleoptera
- Suborder: Polyphaga
- Infraorder: Scarabaeiformia
- Family: Scarabaeidae
- Subfamily: Melolonthinae
- Tribe: Melolonthini
- Genus: Phyllophaga; Harris, 1827

Species
- > 900

= Phyllophaga =

Genus of beetles

Phyllophaga is a very large genus (more than 900 species) of New World scarab beetles in the subfamily Melolonthinae. Common names for this genus and many other related genera in the subfamily Melolonthinae are May beetles, June bugs, and July beetles. They range in size from 12 to 35 mm (0.47 to 1.38 in) and are blackish or reddish-brown in colour, without prominent markings, and often rather hairy ventrally. These beetles are nocturnal, and are attracted to artificial lights in great numbers.

The generic name is derived from the Greek words phyllon (φυλλον), which means "leaf", and phagos (φαγος), which means "eater".

== Life cycle ==
The life cycle takes about one year. Females lay 60 to 75 eggs over a period of about two weeks in midsummer. The white egg at first is elliptical (1.5 mm by 2.1 mm) but becomes more spherical as the larva inside develops. These hatch into white grubs about 18 days after laying. The newly hatched larvae are 8 mm long and grow to a length around 40 mm. Whitish with a brownish-black head, the grubs have conspicuous brown spiracles along the sides of their bodies. They molt twice before winter. The third larval stage lasts nearly nine months, after which they pupate. They hibernate overwinter as grubs that may become active on warm winter days. They increase their activity in the spring.

== Diet ==
The adults are chafers, feeding on foliage of trees and shrubs. They may cause significant damage when emerging in large numbers. The larvae (called white grubs) feed on the roots of grasses and other plants.

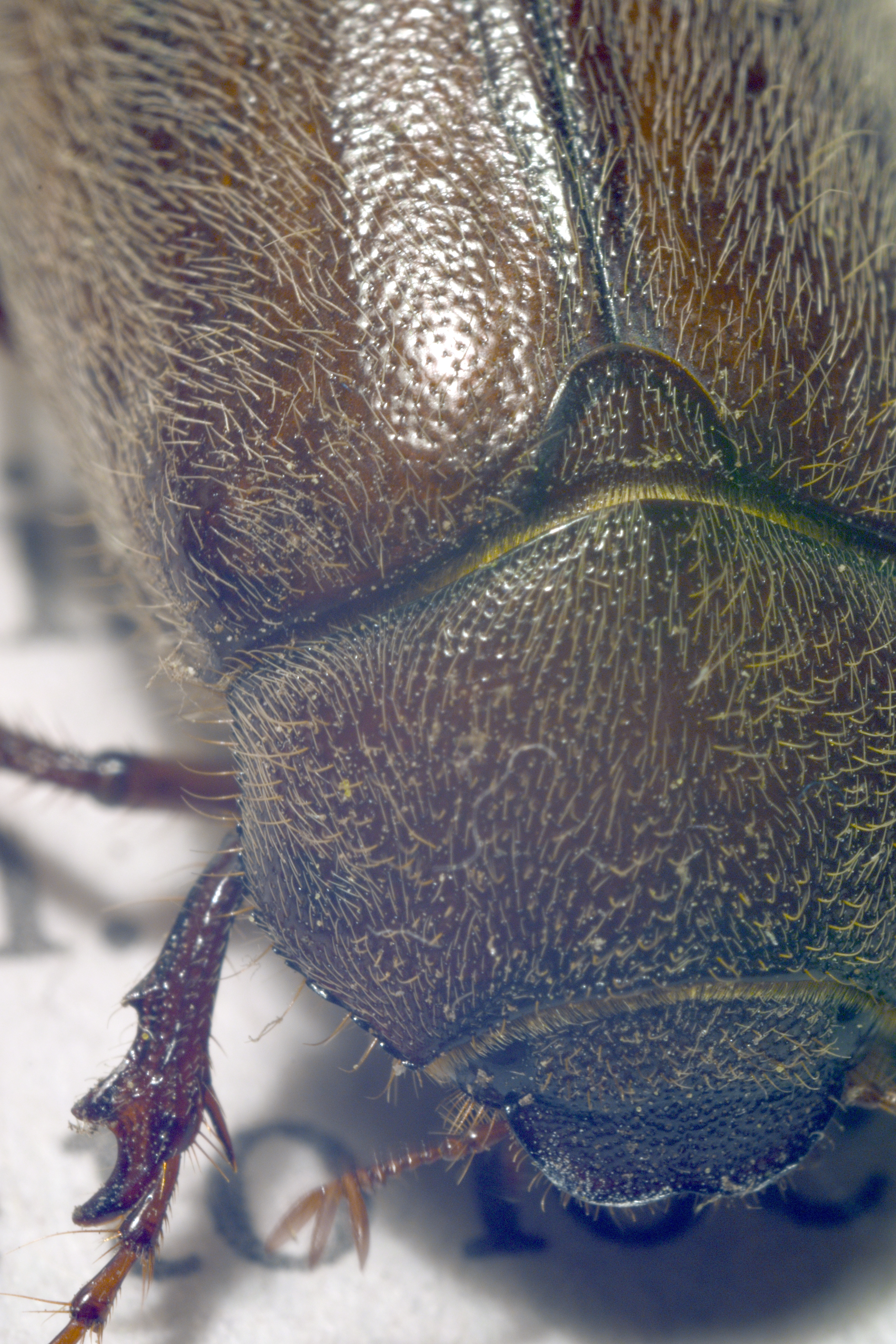
Hairy June Bug found in Ohio, USA

Adult chafers eat the leaves and flowers of many deciduous trees, shrubs, and other plants. However, white grubs (reaching 40–45 mm long when full grown) live in the soil and feed on plant roots, especially those of grasses and cereals, and are occasional pests in pastures, nurseries, gardens, and golf courses. An obvious indication of infestation is the presence of birds, such as crows, peeling back the grass to get to the grubs. The injury consists of poorly growing patches that quickly turn brown in dry weather. The grubs can be found immediately below the surface, usually lying in a characteristic comma-like position.

The grubs sometimes attack vegetables and other garden plants, e.g. lettuce, raspberries, strawberries, potatoes, and young ornamental trees. Injury to the roots and rootstock causes small saplings and tender tap-rooted plants like lettuce to wilt suddenly or to show stunted growth and a tendency to shed leaves prematurely. Plants growing in rows are usually attacked in succession as the grubs move along from one plant to the next. Chafer grubs feed below ground for 3–4 years before changing into adult beetles.

== Predators ==
Some Pyrgotidae flies pursue the beetles in flight to lay an egg on the beetle's back under the elytra where the beetle cannot reach it. The egg hatches and the fly larva enters the body cavity of the beetle, feeding on and eventually killing the host before pupating. A species of bee fly, Exoprosopa fasciata, is also a parasite of this genus. The fly larvae feed on the beetle grub in the ground and pupate in the grub cell where they stay over the winter. Wasps in numerous families, including Pelecinidae, Scoliidae, and Tiphiidae, are parasitoids of Phyllophaga grubs. A variety of amphibians, some small mammals, including skunks and moles, feed on the grubs.

== See also ==
- List of Phyllophaga species
