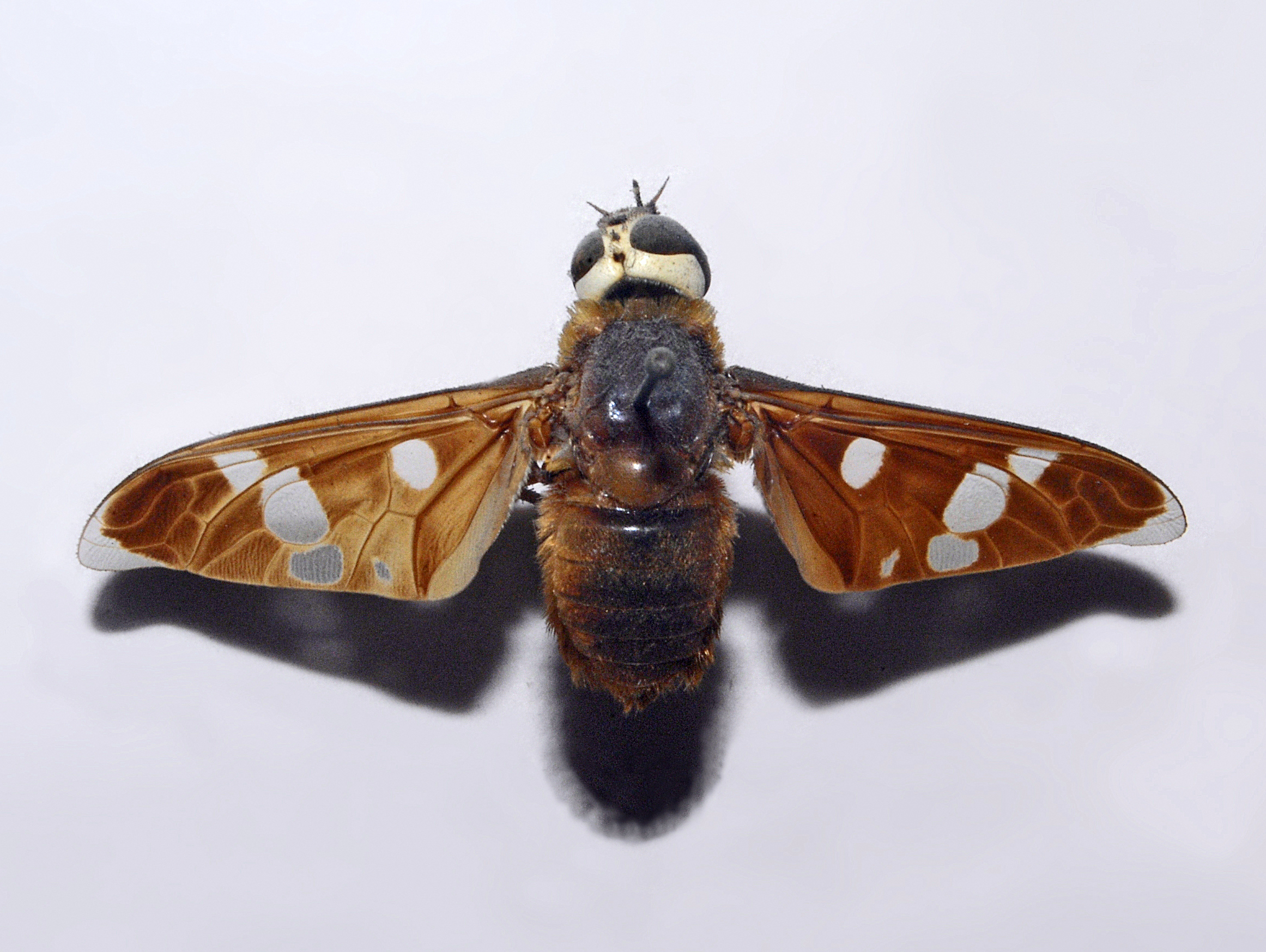
- Museum specimen

Scientific classification
- Kingdom: Animalia
- Phylum: Arthropoda
- Class: Insecta
- Order: Diptera
- Family: Bombyliidae
- Genus: Hyperalonia
- Species: H. morio

Binomial name
- Hyperalonia morio (Fabricius, 1775)

= Hyperalonia morio =

Species of fly

Hyperalonia morio is a species of bee flies in the family Bombyliidae.

== Description ==
Hyperalonia morio is a large bee fly with a bluish black body and a yellow head. Wings are dark bluish, with hyaline areas.

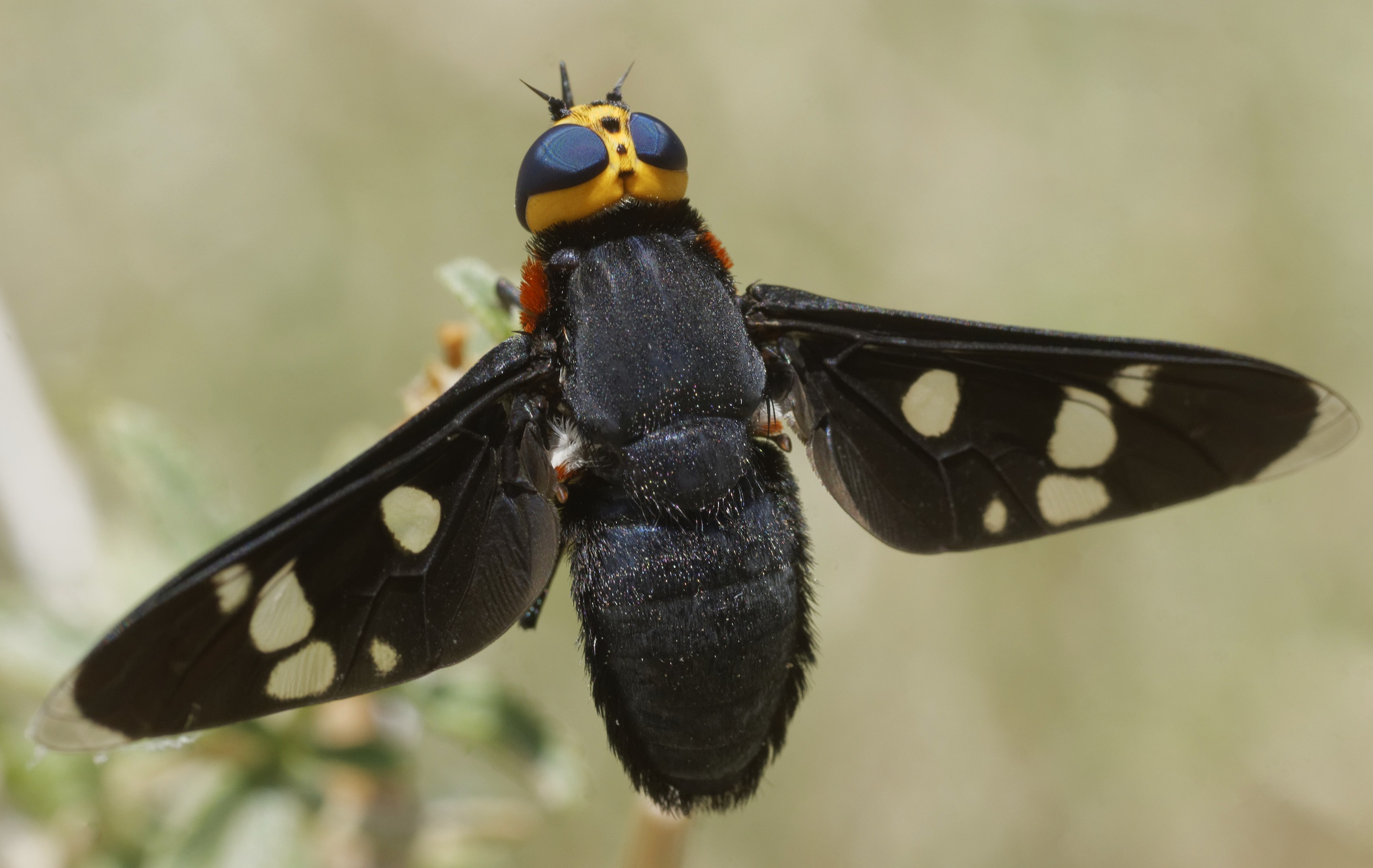
A male of Hyperalonia morio patrolling a patch of vegetation near the visitor center of Quebrada de las Higueritas in Lujan, San Luis, Argentina

== Biology ==
Hyperalonia morio are flower feeders, subsisting on pollen and nectar. These bombyliid flies are only parasitic flies, mainly projecting the eggs into the nest opening of Rubrica nasuta while they are in flight. The 1st instar larvae overwinter feeding on the larvae of their hosts until the following spring.

== Distribution ==
This species is the most widely distributed in South America. It is present in Argentina, Bolivia, Brazil, Chile, Paraguay and Uruguay.
