= Exoprosopa parda =

Scientific classification
- Domain: Eukaryota
- Kingdom: Animalia
- Phylum: Arthropoda
- Class: Insecta
- Order: Diptera
- Family: Bombyliidae
- Genus: Exoprosopa
- Species: E. parda

Binomial name
- Exoprosopa parda Osten Sacken, 1886

Species of fly

Exoprosopa parda is a species of bee fly in the family Bombyliidae.
