= Atrichochira =

Scientific classification
- Kingdom: Animalia
- Phylum: Arthropoda
- Clade: Pancrustacea
- Class: Insecta
- Order: Diptera
- Family: Bombyliidae
- Subfamily: Anthracinae
- Tribe: Exoprosopini
- Genus: Atrichochira; Hesse, 1956

Type species
- Exoprosopa pediformis Bezzi, 1921

Genus of flies

Atrichochira is a genus of flies belonging to the family Bombyliidae (bee-flies). There are four described species, two from Southern Africa and two from western Australia. These are robust and very hairy flies with a body length of 10–13 millimetres (0.4–0.5 in), are yellowish brown with a black mesonotum and the stylate part of the third antennal is thickened.

== Species ==
- Atrichochira commoni Lambkin & Yeates, 2003
- Atrichochira inermis (Bezzi, 1912)
- Atrichochira paramonovi Lambkin & Yeates, 2003
- Atrichochira pediformis (Bezzi, 1921)
