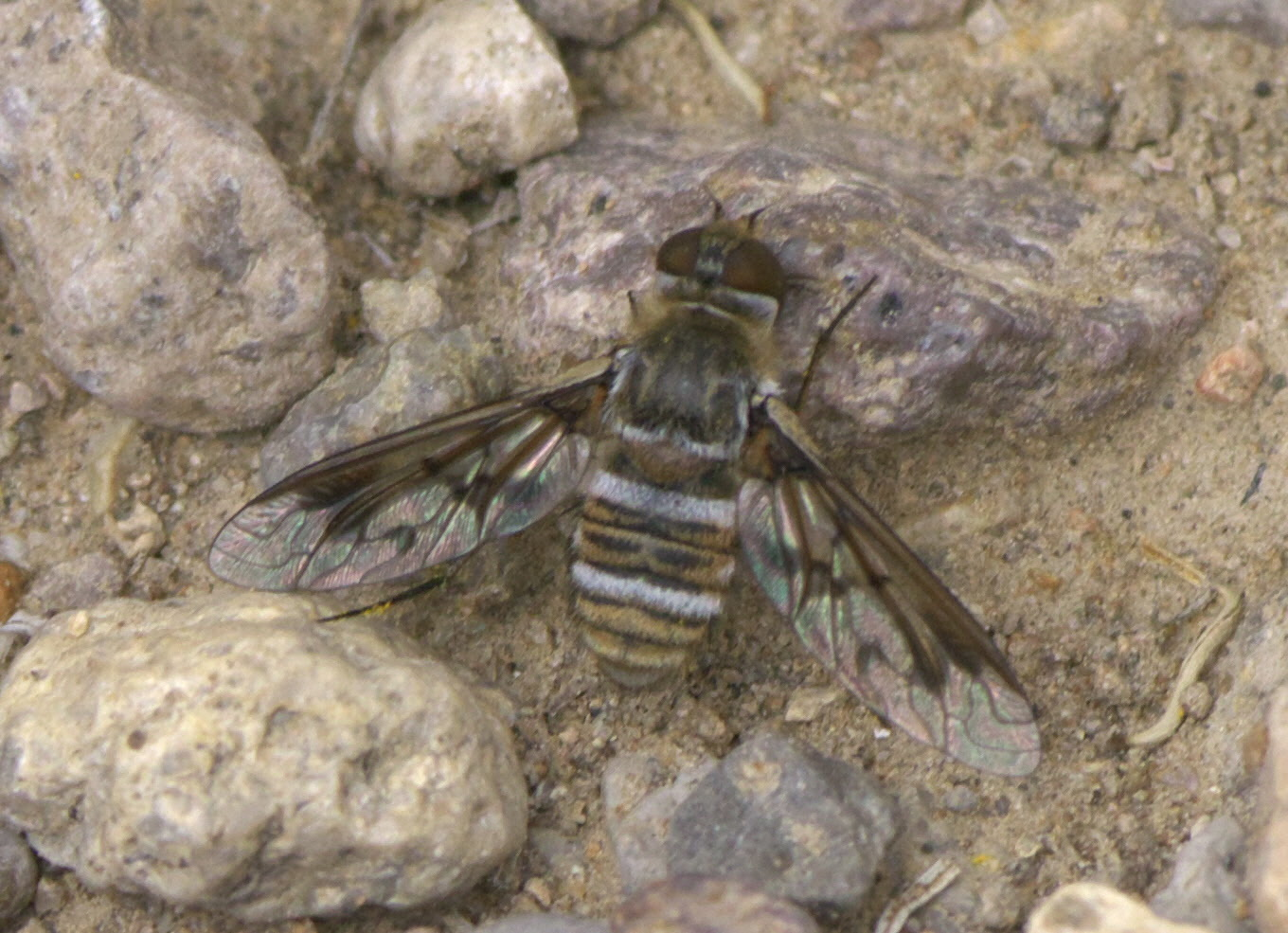
- Exoprosopa doris, Nevada

Scientific classification
- Domain: Eukaryota
- Kingdom: Animalia
- Phylum: Arthropoda
- Class: Insecta
- Order: Diptera
- Family: Bombyliidae
- Tribe: Exoprosopini
- Genus: Exoprosopa
- Species: E. doris

Binomial name
- Exoprosopa doris Osten Sacken, 1877

Synonyms
- Exoprosopa pallens Bigot, 1892

= Exoprosopa doris =

Species of fly

Exoprosopa doris is a species of bee fly in the family Bombyliidae. It occurs in much of western North America.
