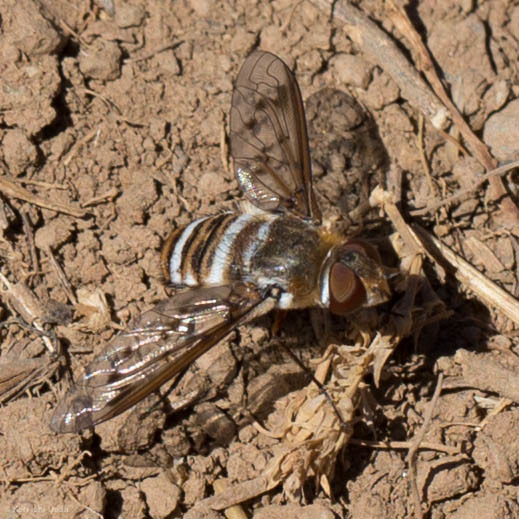

Scientific classification
- Kingdom: Animalia
- Phylum: Arthropoda
- Class: Insecta
- Order: Diptera
- Family: Bombyliidae
- Genus: Exoprosopa
- Species: E. painterorum

Binomial name
- Exoprosopa painterorum Johnson & Johnson, 1960

Synonyms
- Exoprosopa cingulata Johnson and Johnson, 1959

= Exoprosopa painterorum =

Species of fly

Exoprosopa painterorum is a species of bee fly in the family Bombyliidae.
