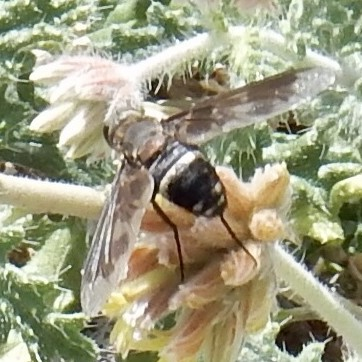

Scientific classification
- Kingdom: Animalia
- Phylum: Arthropoda
- Class: Insecta
- Order: Diptera
- Family: Bombyliidae
- Genus: Exoprosopa
- Species: E. ingens

Binomial name
- Exoprosopa ingens Cresson, 1919

= Exoprosopa ingens =

Species of fly

Exoprosopa ingens is a species of bee fly in the family Bombyliidae.
