= Exoprosopa brevirostris =

Scientific classification
- Domain: Eukaryota
- Kingdom: Animalia
- Phylum: Arthropoda
- Class: Insecta
- Order: Diptera
- Family: Bombyliidae
- Genus: Exoprosopa
- Species: E. brevirostris

Binomial name
- Exoprosopa brevirostris Williston, 1901

Species of fly

Exoprosopa brevirostris is a species of bee fly in the family Bombyliidae.
