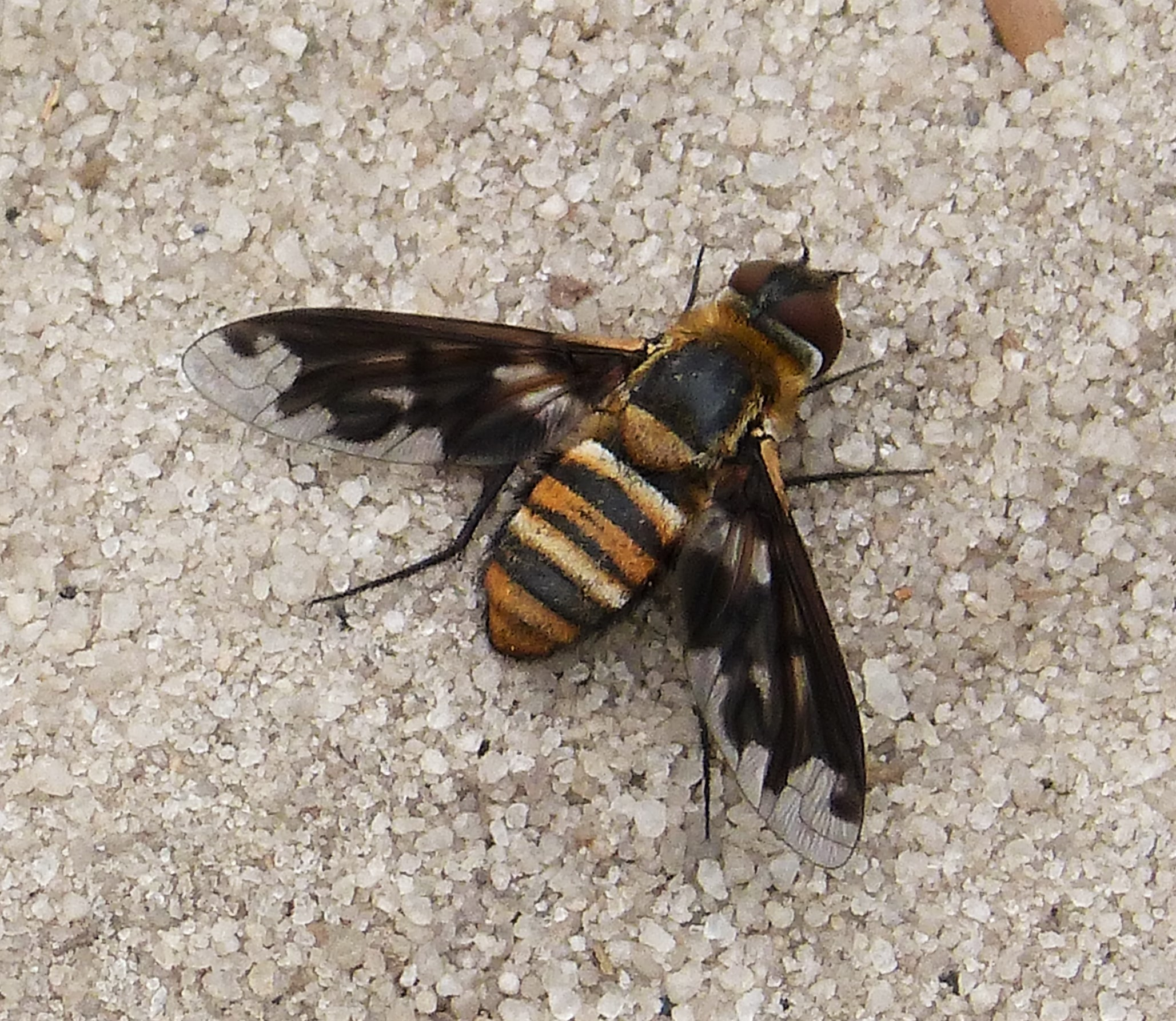

Scientific classification
- Kingdom: Animalia
- Phylum: Arthropoda
- Clade: Pancrustacea
- Class: Insecta
- Order: Diptera
- Family: Bombyliidae
- Genus: Exoprosopa
- Species: E. fascipennis

Binomial name
- Exoprosopa fascipennis (Say, 1824)

Synonyms
- Anthrax fascipennis Say, 1824; Exoprosopa coniceps Macquart, 1850; Exoprosopa melanura Bigot, 1892; Exoprosopa philadelphica Macquart, 1840

= Exoprosopa fascipennis =

Species of fly

Exoprosopa fascipennis is a species of bee fly in the family Bombyliidae. It is widespread in North America, ranging across most of southern Canada and the United States, and is also reported from Cuba. The larvae are ectoparasites of solitary wasp larvae.
