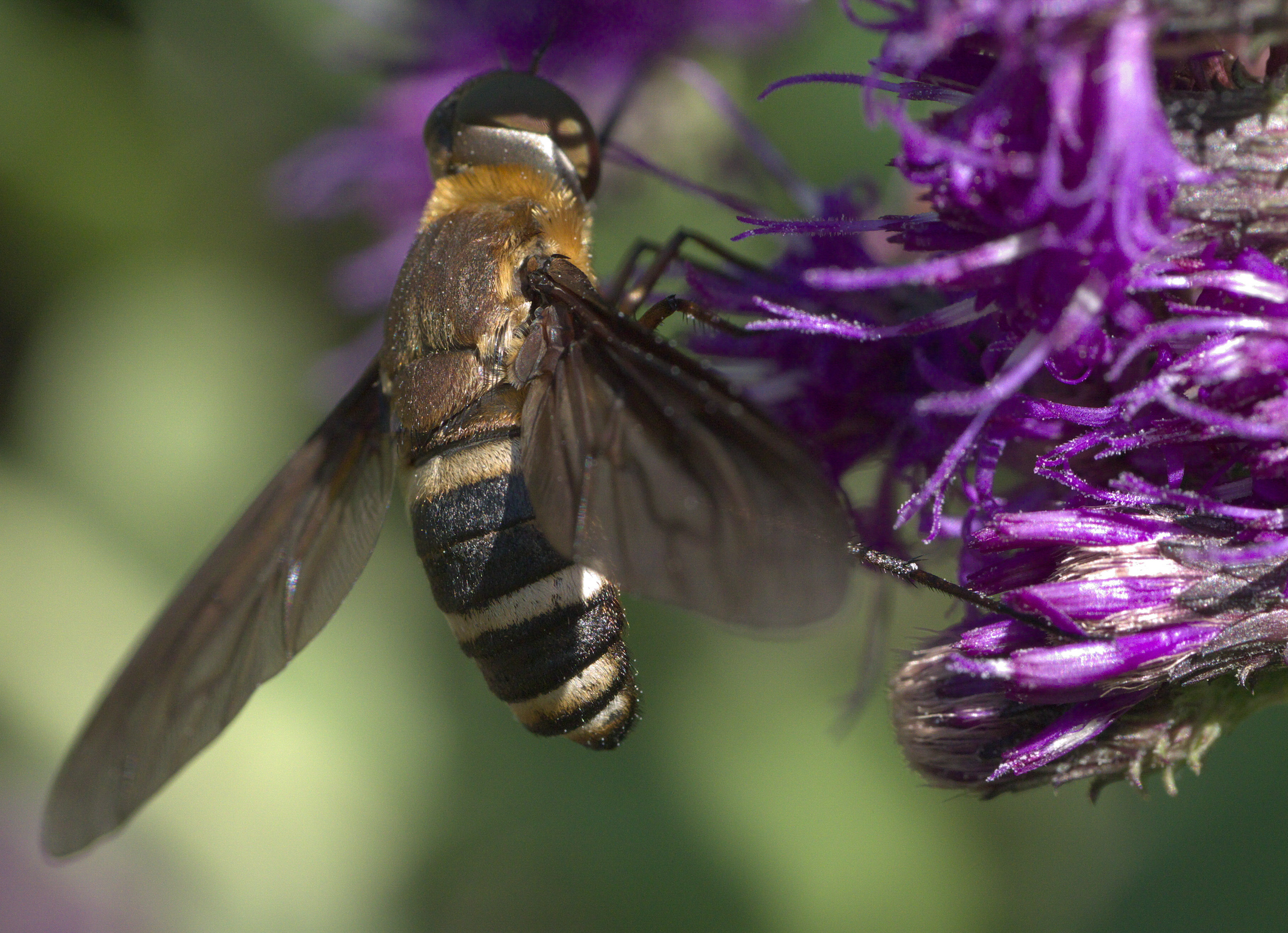

Scientific classification
- Domain: Eukaryota
- Kingdom: Animalia
- Phylum: Arthropoda
- Class: Insecta
- Order: Diptera
- Family: Bombyliidae
- Tribe: Exoprosopini
- Genus: Exoprosopa
- Species: E. fasciata

Binomial name
- Exoprosopa fasciata Macquart, 1840

Synonyms
- Exoprosopa longirostris Macquart, 1850; Exoprosopa rubiginosa Macquart, 1840; Mulio americana Wulp, 1867

= Exoprosopa fasciata =

Species of fly

Exoprosopa fasciata is a species of bee fly in the family Bombyliidae.

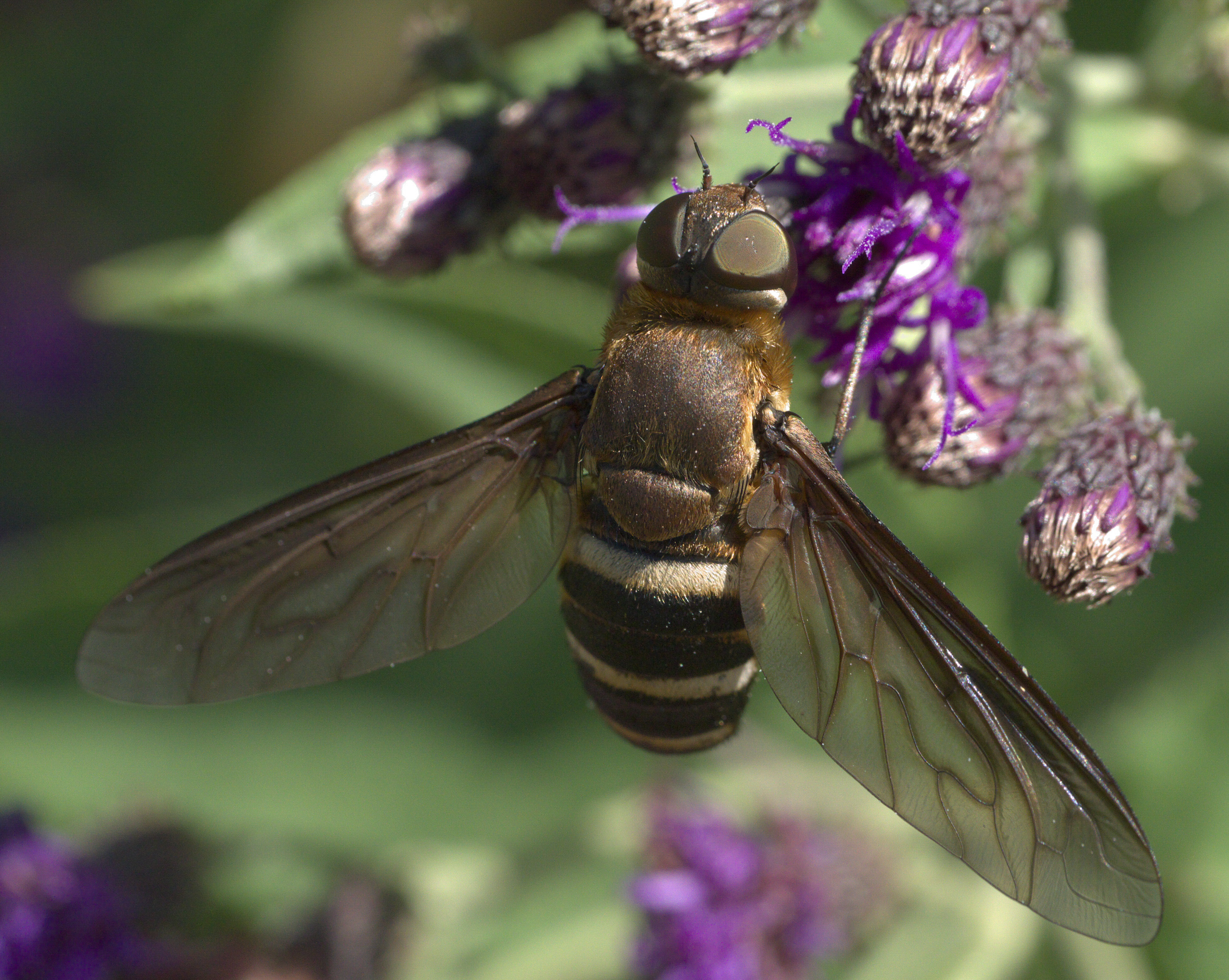

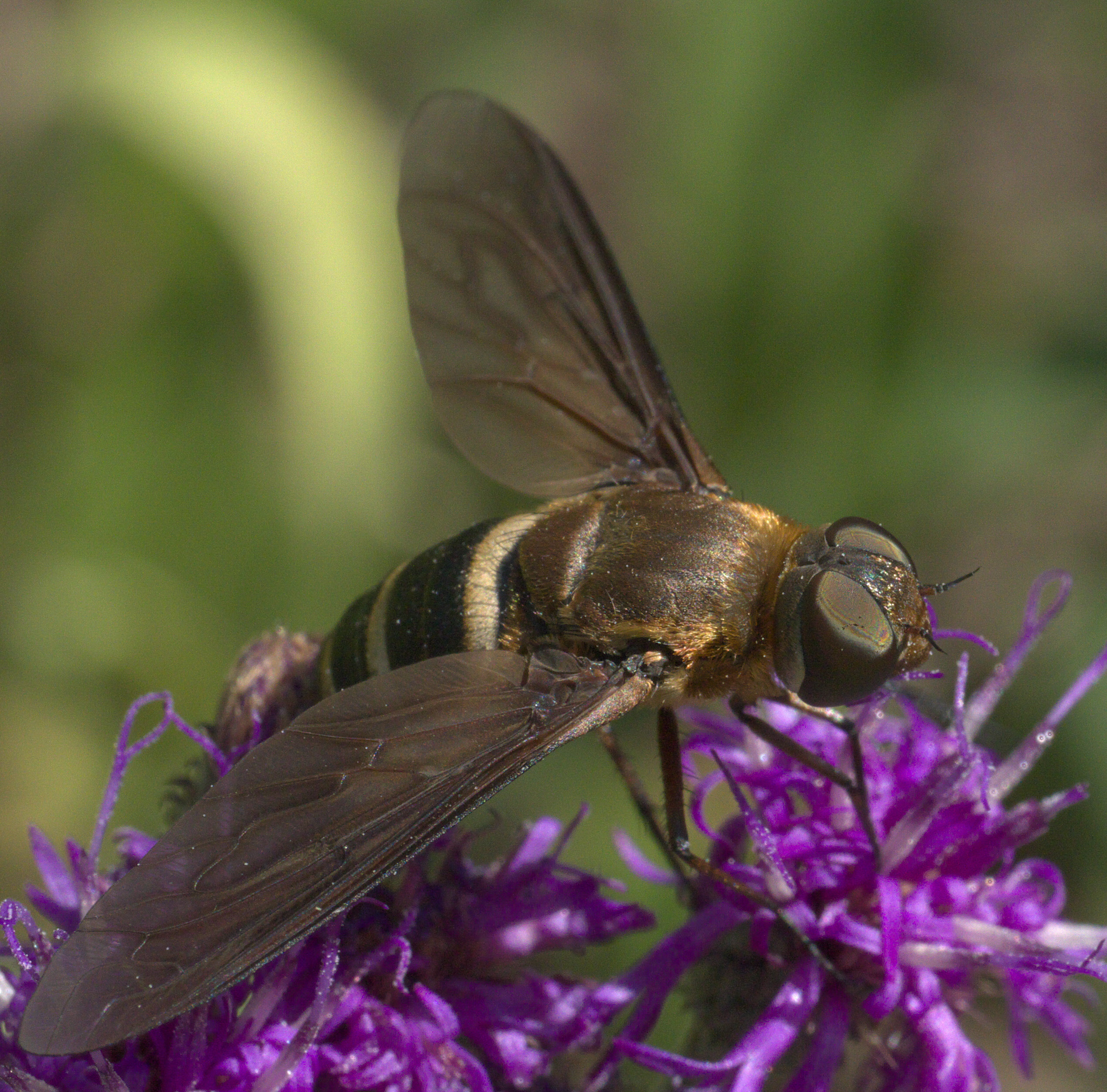
