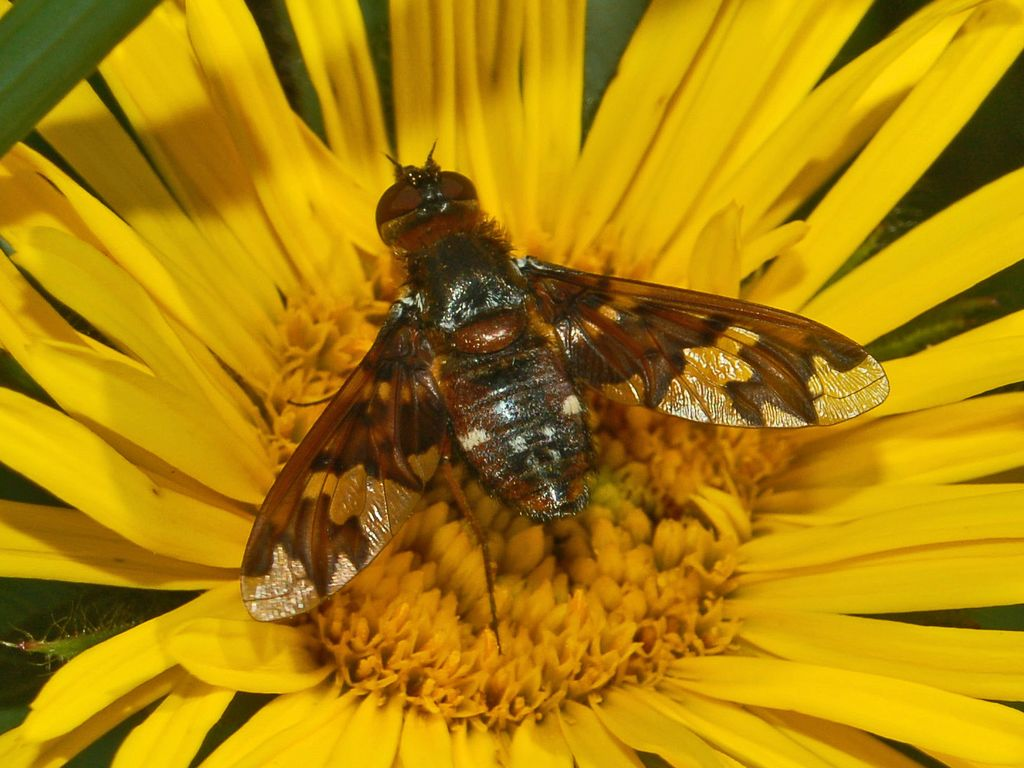

Scientific classification
- Kingdom: Animalia
- Phylum: Arthropoda
- Class: Insecta
- Order: Diptera
- Family: Bombyliidae
- Genus: Exoprosopa
- Species: E. capucina

Binomial name
- Exoprosopa capucina (Fabricius, 1781)

= Exoprosopa capucina =

Species of fly

Exoprosopa capucina is a species of bee fly belonging to the family Bombyliidae, in subfamily Anthracinae.

This bee fly is present in most of Europe and in the Near East.

The average body length of the adults reaches 12 millimetres (0.47 in). The head is quite large, with small antennae. The dark-brown wings are large too, with translucent areas on their margin and a completely dark cell (R1) on the front border, without hyaline spot. The thorax and the abdomen are greyish brown.
