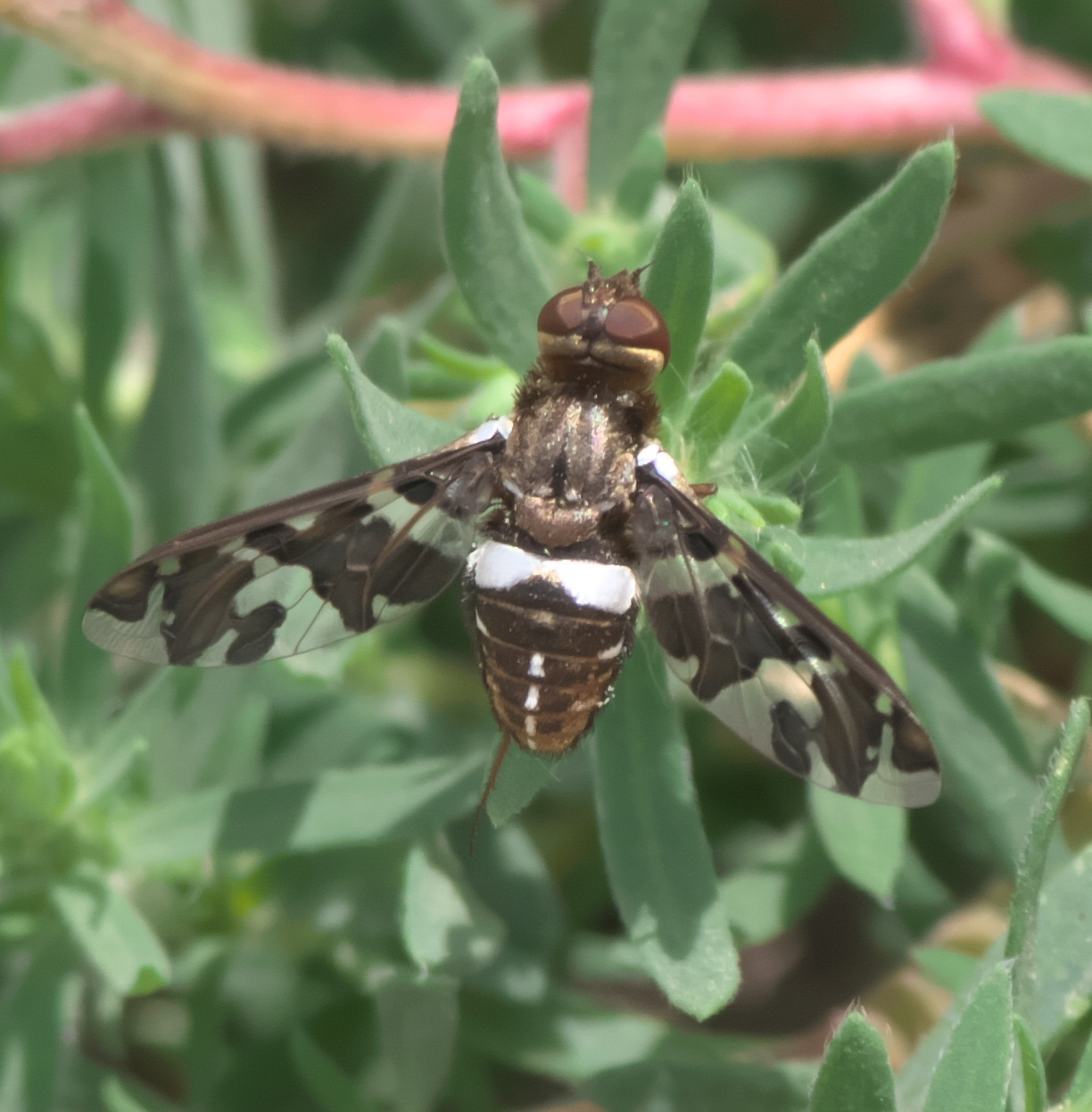

Scientific classification
- Kingdom: Animalia
- Phylum: Arthropoda
- Class: Insecta
- Order: Diptera
- Family: Bombyliidae
- Genus: Exoprosopa
- Species: E. caliptera

Binomial name
- Exoprosopa caliptera (Say, 1823)

Synonyms
- Anthrax caliptera Say, 1823

= Exoprosopa caliptera =

Species of fly

Exoprosopa caliptera is a species of bee flies in the family Bombyliidae. Its range is noted as being in British Columbia, Canada, as well as throughout the Western United States, Arkansas, and South Dakota. It is also found in the Mexican state of Durango.
