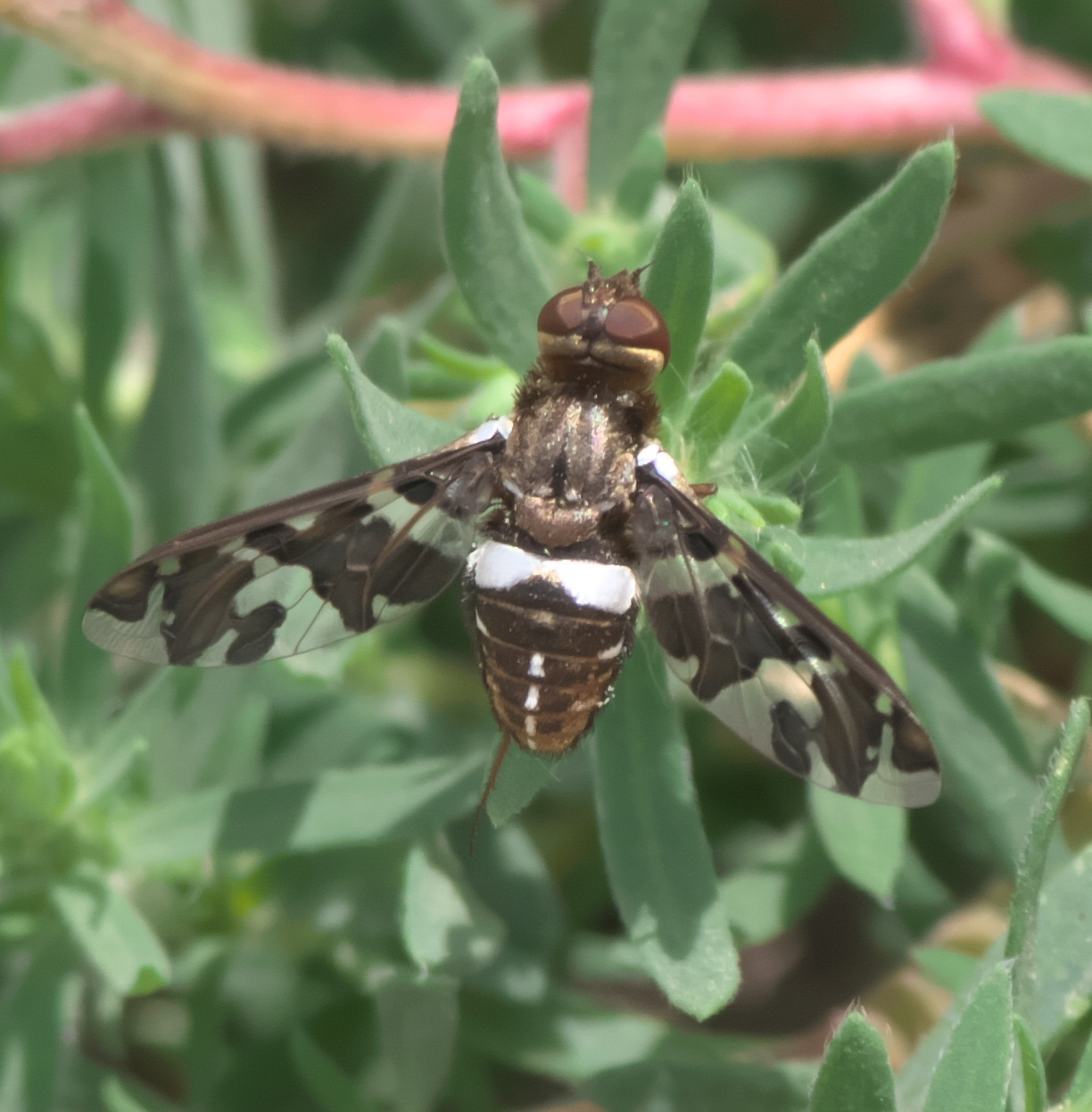
- Exoprosopa caliptera

Scientific classification
- Kingdom: Animalia
- Phylum: Arthropoda
- Clade: Pancrustacea
- Class: Insecta
- Order: Diptera
- Family: Bombyliidae
- Subfamily: Anthracinae
- Tribe: Exoprosopini

= Exoprosopini =

Tribe of flies

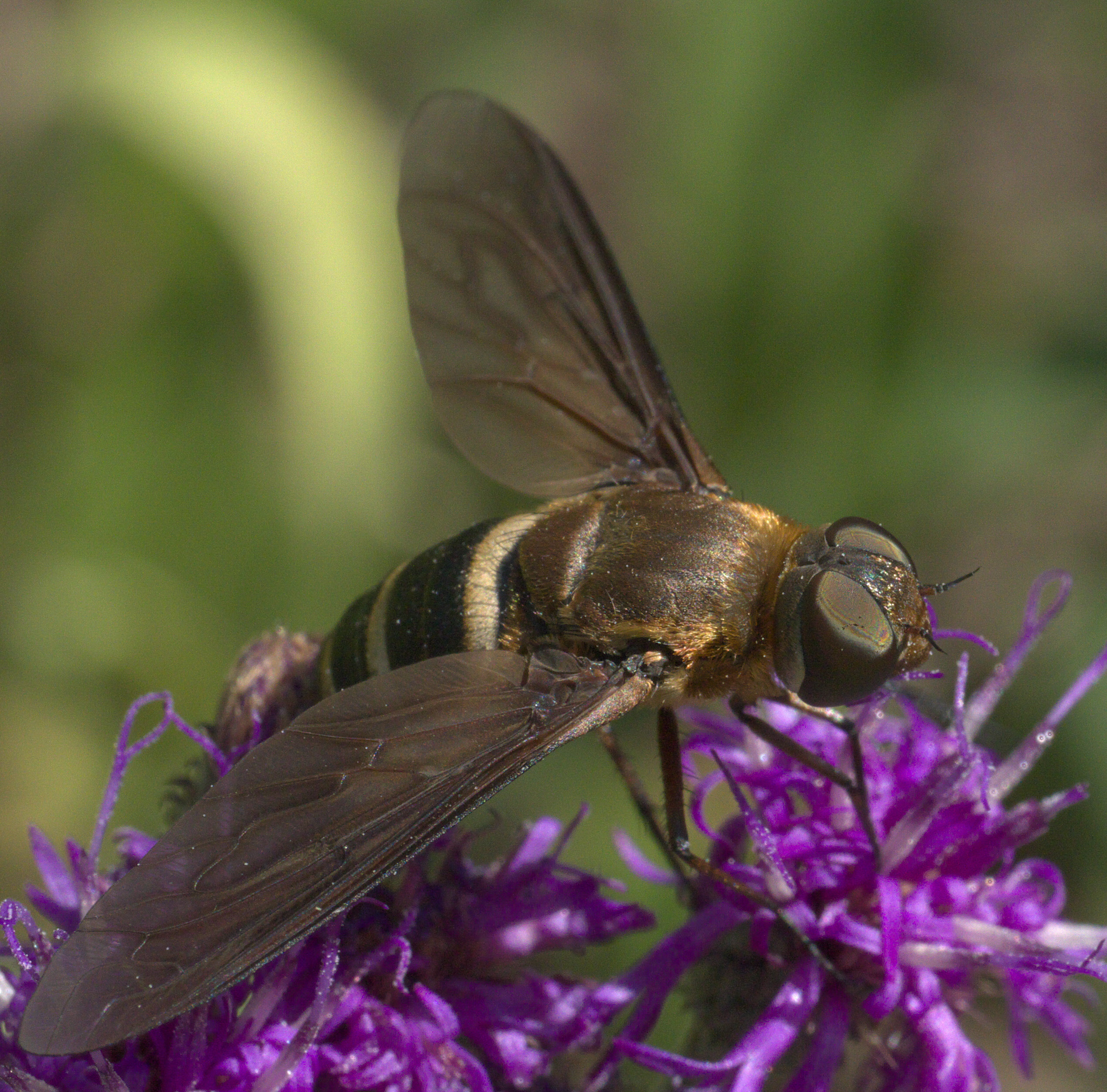
Exoprosopa fasciata

Exoprosopini is a tribe of bee flies in the family Bombyliidae. There are more than 20 genera and 760 described species within the tribe Exoprosopini.

== Genera ==
- Atrichochira Hesse, 1956
- Balaana Lambkin & Yeates, 2003
- Collosoptera Hull, 1973
- Defilippia Lioy, 1864
- Diatropomma Bowden, 1962
- Euligyra Lambkin, 2003
- Exoprosopa Macquart, 1840
- Heteralonia Rondani, 1863
- Hyperalonia Rondani, 1864
- Kapu Lambkin & Yeates, 2006
- Larrpana Lambkin & Yeates, 2003
- Ligyra Newman, 1841
- Litorhina Bowden, 1975
- Micomitra Bowden, 1964
- Munjua Lambkin & Yeates, 2003
- Muwarna Lambkin & Yeates, 2003
- Ngalki Lambkin, 2011
- Nyia Márquez-Acero et al., 2020
- Palirika Lambkin & Yeates, 2003
- Pseudopenthes Roberts, 1928
- Pterobates Bezzi, 1924
- Wurda Lambkin & Yeates, 2003
