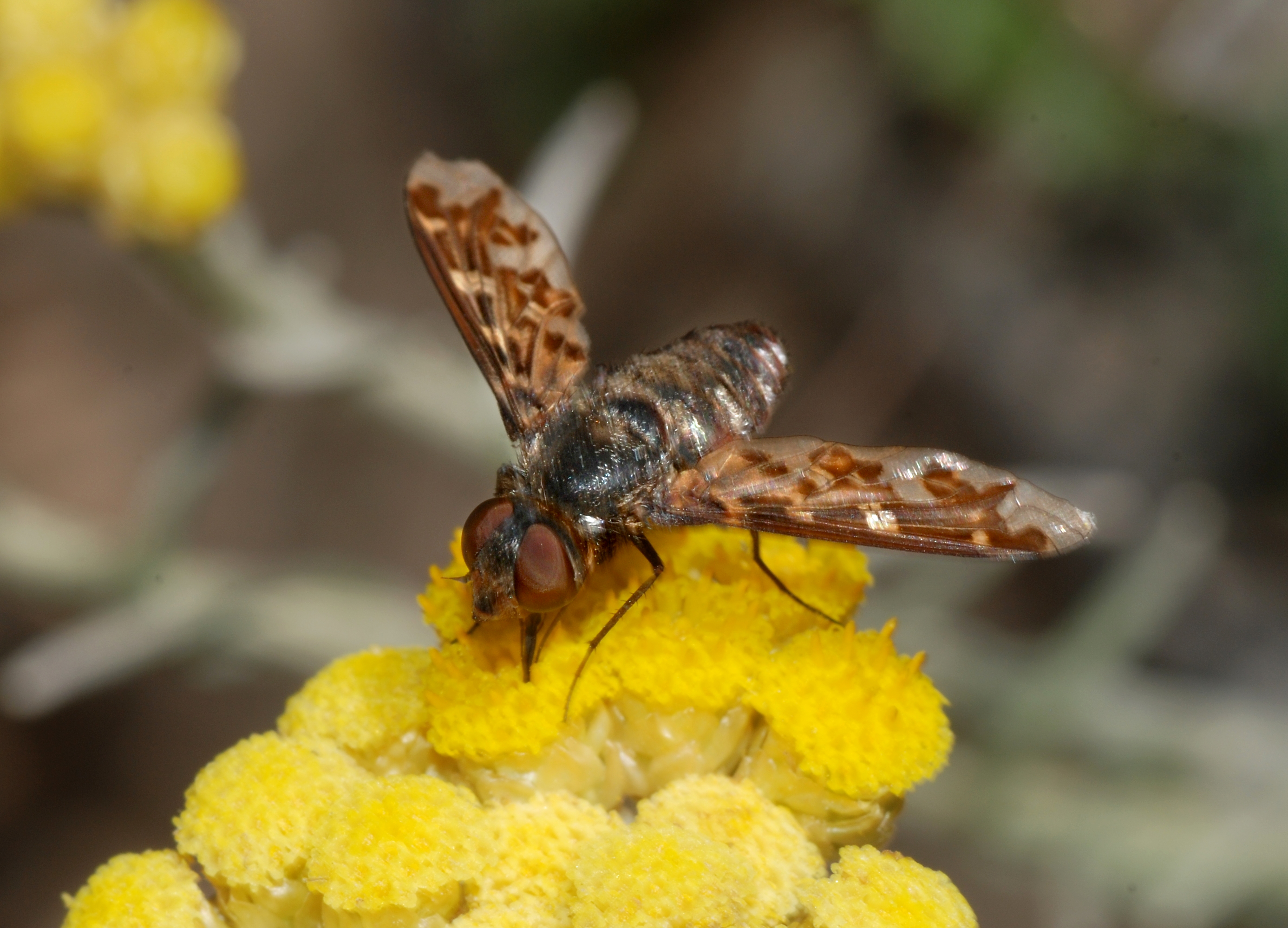
- Exoprosopa italica

Scientific classification
- Kingdom: Animalia
- Phylum: Arthropoda
- Class: Insecta
- Order: Diptera
- Family: Bombyliidae
- Tribe: Exoprosopini
- Genus: Exoprosopa; Macquart, 1840

Type species
- Bibio capucina Fabricius, 1781

Synonyms
- Litorhynchus Macquart, 1840; Trinaria Mulsant, 1852; Argyrospila Rondani, 1856; Defilippia Lioy, 1864; Litorrhynchus Verrall in Scudder, 1882; Exoptata Coquillett, 1887; Cladodisca Bezzi, 1922; Litomyza Hull, 1973

= Exoprosopa =

Genus of flies

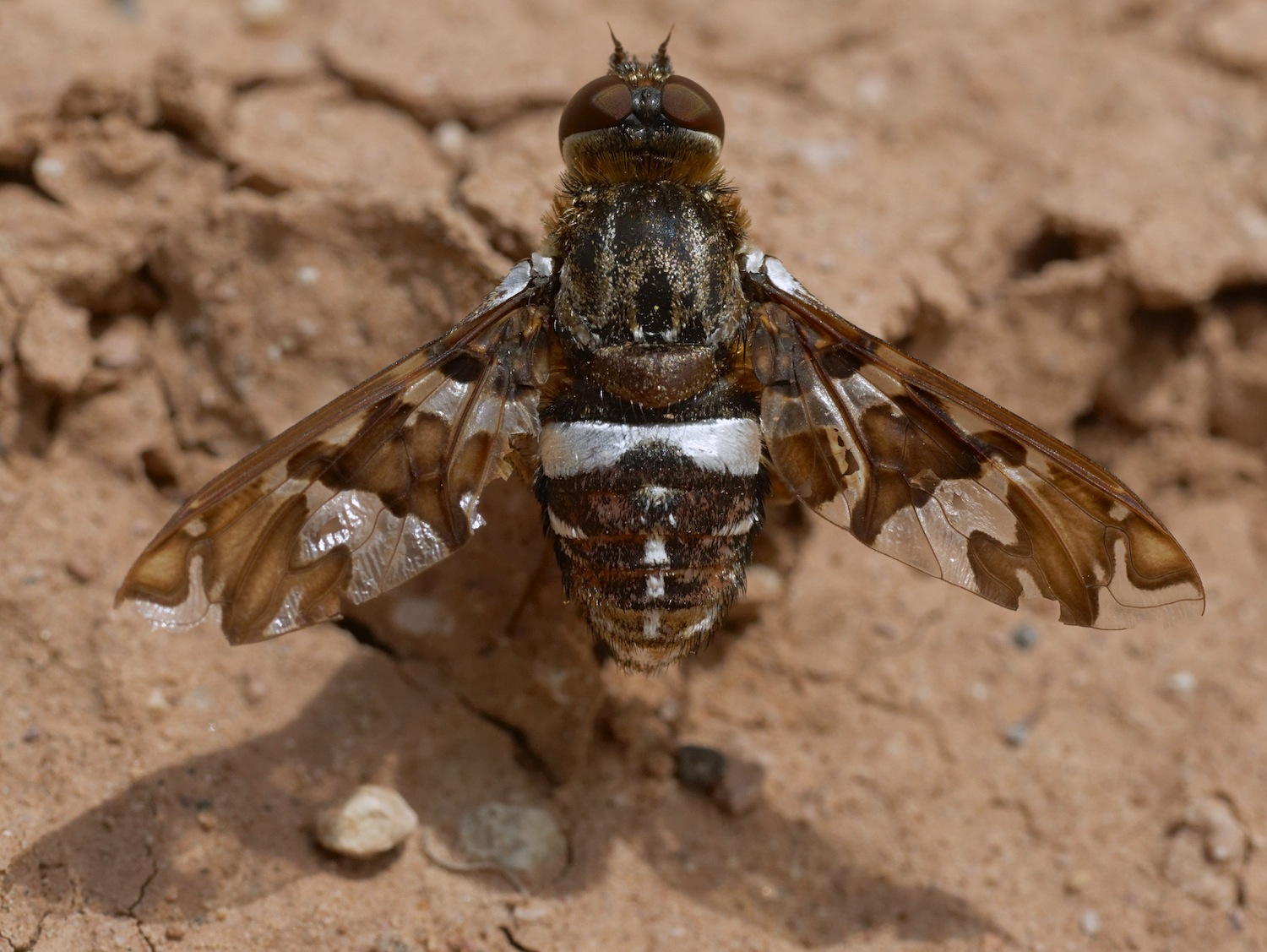
Exoprosopa caliptera in Great Sand Dunes National Park, Colorado, US - note the silvery mirror stripes formed by patches of specialized hairs modified into reflecting scales

Exoprosopa is a large cosmopolitan genus of flies belonging to the family Bombyliidae (bee-flies), with over 325 described species. The genus parasitizes a wide range of insects, including locust and larvae of wasps.

== Description ==
This genus contains the largest bee flies, of about 14 mm, sometimes larger, up to 22 mm, though a few species are as small as 6 mm. The proboscis is short. The head is large and only loosely attached to the thorax. The antenna are small and well separated. Wings are large, with wingspan 40 mm, up to 64 mm in the largest species, nearly always boldly patterned; abdomen patterned (often banded) with white or pale scales on segment 6 and 7 or on each segment. Many species are sexually dimorphic.

== Distribution ==
Species are found worldwide, however Southern Africa is especially species rich with over 135 species.

== See also ==
- List of Exoprosopa species
