= List of Phyllophaga species =

This is a list of 905 species in the genus Phyllophaga, May beetles.

== Phyllophaga species ==
=== A ===
- Phyllophaga abcea Saylor, 1940
- Phyllophaga abdominalis (Moser, 1921)
- Phyllophaga abudantuni Chalumeau & Gruner, 1976
- Phyllophaga acacoyahuana Morón & Blas, 2005
- Phyllophaga acapulca Saylor, 1943
- Phyllophaga acatlanensis Morón & Aragon-Garcia, 2012
- Phyllophaga aceitillar Woodruff, 2005
- Phyllophaga acinosa (Arrow, 1920)
- Phyllophaga acunai Chapin, 1937
- Phyllophaga adjuntas Saylor, 1940
- Phyllophaga adoretoides (Von Dalle Torre, 1912)
- Phyllophaga aegrotus (Bates, 1887)
- Phyllophaga aemula (Horn, 1887)
- Phyllophaga aenea (Moser, 1921)
- Phyllophaga aeneotincta Chapin, 1932
- Phyllophaga aequalis (LeConte, 1854)
- Phyllophaga aequata Bates, 1887
- Phyllophaga aequatorialis (Moser, 1921)
- Phyllophaga aeruginosa (Burmeister, 1855)
- Phyllophaga affabilis (Horn, 1887)
- Phyllophaga afflicta (Blanchard, 1851)
- Phyllophaga aguadita (Saylor, 1942)
- Phyllophaga ahlbrandti Garcia-Vidal, 1988
- Phyllophaga alayoi Garcia-Vidal, 1978
- Phyllophaga albina (Burmeister, 1855)
- Phyllophaga alcoa Woodruff, 2005
- Phyllophaga aliada Sanderson, 1951
- Phyllophaga aliciae Morón & Rivera-Cervantes, 2005
- Phyllophaga almada Saylor, 1941
- Phyllophaga alquizara Chapin, 1932
- Phyllophaga alvareztoroi Morón & Blas, 2005
- Phyllophaga amazonica (Moser, 1918)
- Phyllophaga amplicornis (Reinhard, 1939)
- Phyllophaga analis (Burmeister, 1855)
- Phyllophaga andersoni Smith & Paulsen, 2015
- Phyllophaga androw Woodruff, 2005
- Phyllophaga angulicollis (Bates, 1887)
- Phyllophaga angusta (Blanchard, 1851)
- Phyllophaga anolaminata (Moser, 1921)
- Phyllophaga anomaloides (Bates, 1888)
- Phyllophaga antennalis (Moser, 1921)
- Phyllophaga antennata (Smith, 1889)
- Phyllophaga antiguae (Arrow, 1920)
- Phyllophaga anxia (LeConte, 1850) (cranberry white grub)
- Phyllophaga apicalis (Blanchard, 1851)
- Phyllophaga apicata Reinhard, 1939
- Phyllophaga apolinari Saylor, 1940
- Phyllophaga apolinaria Saylor, 1942
- Phyllophaga approxima Woodruff & Sanderson, 2005
- Phyllophaga aragoni Morón, 2013
- Phyllophaga arcta (Horn, 1887)
- Phyllophaga ardara Saylor, 1943
- Phyllophaga arenicola Howden, 1960
- Phyllophaga arizona Saylor, 1940
- Phyllophaga arkansana (Schaeffer, 1906)
- Phyllophaga arribans Saylor, 1943
- Phyllophaga arrowi Saylor, 1935
- Phyllophaga assmani Saylor, 1936
- Phyllophaga atra (Moser, 1918)
- Phyllophaga atrata (Moser, 1918)
- Phyllophaga atratoides Morón, 2003
- Phyllophaga audanti Wolcott, 1928
- Phyllophaga aurea Luginbill and Painter, 1941
- Phyllophaga austera (Erichson, 1847)
- Phyllophaga avus (Cockerell, 1922)

=== B ===
- Phyllophaga babicora Morón, 2004
- Phyllophaga babis Saylor, 1943
- Phyllophaga bahiana (Saylor, 1935)
- Phyllophaga balacachiana Morón, Lugo-García & Aragón-García, 2015
- Phyllophaga balia (Say, 1825)
- Phyllophaga balli Morón & Woodruff, 2008
- Phyllophaga balsana Morón & Aragon-Garcia, 2012
- Phyllophaga baneta Saylor, 1943
- Phyllophaga baoruco Woodruff, 2005
- Phyllophaga baracoana Chapin, 1932
- Phyllophaga baraguensis Chapin, 1932
- Phyllophaga barda (Horn, 1887)
- Phyllophaga baroni (Bates, 1889)
- Phyllophaga barrerana Aragon & Morón, 2003
- Phyllophaga barrosa Sanderson, 1951
- Phyllophaga batillifer (Bates, 1887)
- Phyllophaga beameri Sanderson, 1958
- Phyllophaga beckeri (Moser, 1921)
- Phyllophaga bellamyi Warner and Morón, 1992
- Phyllophaga benexonana Morón, 2000
- Phyllophaga bicavifrons Chapin, 1932
- Phyllophaga bicolor (Moser, 1921)
- Phyllophaga bilobatata Saylor, 1939
- Phyllophaga bilyi Chalumeau, 1989
- Phyllophaga bimaculata Garcia-Vidal, 1984
- Phyllophaga bimammifrons Saylor, 1940
- Phyllophaga bipartita (Horn, 1887)
- Phyllophaga blackwelderi Saylor, 1940
- Phyllophaga blanchardi (Arrow, 1933)
- Phyllophaga blanda Sanderson, 1958
- Phyllophaga bolacoides (Bates, 1887)
- Phyllophaga boliviensis (Blanchard, 1851)
- Phyllophaga bonfils Woodruff & Sanderson, 2005
- Phyllophaga boruca Morón, 2003
- Phyllophaga bottimeri Reinhard, 1950
- Phyllophaga bowditchi Saylor, 1938
- Phyllophaga brama Saylor, 1943
- Phyllophaga bretti Smith & Paulsen, 2015
- Phyllophaga brevicornis Garcia-Vidal, 1988
- Phyllophaga brevidens (Bates, 1888)
- Phyllophaga brevipilosa (Moser, 1918)
- Phyllophaga brownella Saylor, 1942
- Phyllophaga bruneri Chapin, 1932 (Cuban May beetle)
- Phyllophaga buapae Morón, 2013
- Phyllophaga bucephala (Bates, 1887)
- Phyllophaga bueta Saylor, 1940

=== C ===
- Phyllophaga caanchaki Morón, 1998
- Phyllophaga cahitana Morón, 2001
- Phyllophaga calai Smith & Paulsen, 2015
- Phyllophaga calceata (LeConte, 1856)
- Phyllophaga calculiventris Saylor, 1935
- Phyllophaga calderasa (Saylor, 1937)
- Phyllophaga callosiventris (Moser, 1921)
- Phyllophaga cambeforti Cartwright & Chalumeau, 1977
- Phyllophaga campana Morón & Riley, 2005
- Phyllophaga caneyensis Garcia-Vidal, 1984
- Phyllophaga canipolea Saylor, 1948
- Phyllophaga canoa Sanderson, 1951
- Phyllophaga canoana Morón, 2003
- Phyllophaga capillata (Blanchard, 1851)
- Phyllophaga caraga Saylor, 1943
- Phyllophaga cardini Chapin, 1932
- Phyllophaga carminator (Horn, 1894)
- Phyllophaga carnegie Woodruff, 2005
- Phyllophaga cartaba Sanderson, 1951
- Phyllophaga castaniella (Bates, 1887)
- Phyllophaga castineirasi Garcia-Vidal, 1978
- Phyllophaga catemacoana Morón, 2003
- Phyllophaga cavata (Bates, 1888)
- Phyllophaga caviceps (Moser, 1918)
- Phyllophaga cayennensis (Moser, 1918)
- Phyllophaga caymanensis Sanderson, 1939
- Phyllophaga cazahuata Morón, 2013
- Phyllophaga cazieriana Saylor, 1938
- Phyllophaga cececpana Morón, 2016
- Phyllophaga centralis (Nonfried, 1894)
- Phyllophaga certanca Saylor, 1943
- Phyllophaga chada Saylor, 1948
- Phyllophaga chalumeaui Garcia-Vidal, 1984
- Phyllophaga chamacayoca Morón, 1992
- Phyllophaga chamula Morón, 1999
- Phyllophaga changuena Morón, 2003
- Phyllophaga chapini Saylor, 1940
- Phyllophaga chiapas Saylor, 1943
- Phyllophaga chiapensis Chapin, 1935
- Phyllophaga chiblacana Morón, 2003
- Phyllophaga chimoxtila Morón, 2003
- Phyllophaga chippewa Saylor, 1939
- Phyllophaga chiriquina (Bates, 1887)
- Phyllophaga chlaenobiana Saylor, 1936
- Phyllophaga choixiana Morón, Lugo-García & Aragón-García, 2015
- Phyllophaga cholana Morón, 2003
- Phyllophaga chortiana Morón, 2003
- Phyllophaga ciliatipes Blanchard, 1850
- Phyllophaga cinnamomea (Blanchard, 1851)
- Phyllophaga citarae Morón & Neita-Moreno, 2014
- Phyllophaga ciudadensis (Bates, 1888)
- Phyllophaga clavijeroi Morón, 2015
- Phyllophaga clemens (Horn, 1887)
- Phyllophaga clypeata (Horn, 1887)
- Phyllophaga cneda Saylor, 1940
- Phyllophaga coahuayana Morón, 2006
- Phyllophaga cochisa Saylor, 1940
- Phyllophaga cocleana Morón, 2013
- Phyllophaga colima Saylor, 1943
- Phyllophaga colimana (Moser, 1921)
- Phyllophaga collaris (Moser, 1921)
- Phyllophaga collaroides Morón, Lugo-García & Aragón-García, 2015
- Phyllophaga columbiana (Blanchard, 1851)
- Phyllophaga comaltepecana Morón, 2003
- Phyllophaga cometes (Bates, 1887)
- Phyllophaga complexipennis Garcia-Vidal, 1984
- Phyllophaga conformis (Blanchard, 1851)
- Phyllophaga congrua (LeConte, 1856)
- Phyllophaga conicariana Morón, 2006
- Phyllophaga contaminata Fall, 1932
- Phyllophaga coronadis Saylor, 1941
- Phyllophaga corrosa (LeConte, 1856)
- Phyllophaga costaricensis (Moser, 1918)
- Phyllophaga costura Sanderson, 1951
- Phyllophaga crassa (Burmeister, 1855)
- Phyllophaga crassissima (Blanchard, 1851)
- Phyllophaga crena Saylor, 1941
- Phyllophaga crenaticollis (Blanchard, 1851)
- Phyllophaga crenonycha Saylor, 1943
- Phyllophaga crenulata (Frölich, 1792)
- Phyllophaga cribrosa (LeConte, 1853)
- Phyllophaga crinipennis (Bates, 1889)
- Phyllophaga crinita (Burmeister, 1855)
- Phyllophaga crinitissima Wolcott, 1924
- Phyllophaga cristagalli (Arrow, 1933)
- Phyllophaga cristobala Saylor, 1942
- Phyllophaga cruces Morón & Riley, 2005
- Phyllophaga cubana Chapin, 1932
- Phyllophaga cuicateca Morón & Aragon, 1997
- Phyllophaga culminata Bates, 1887
- Phyllophaga cupuliformis Langston, 1924
- Phyllophaga curialis Reinhard, 1939
- Phyllophaga cushmani Saylor, 1940
- Phyllophaga cuyabana (Moser, 1918)
- Phyllophaga cylindrica (Burmeister, 1855)

=== D–F ===
- Phyllophaga darlingtoni Sanderson, 1940
- Phyllophaga dasypoda (Bates, 1887)
- Phyllophaga davidsoni Woodruff, 2005
- Phyllophaga davisi Langston, 1927
- Phyllophaga debilis (LeConte, 1856)
- Phyllophaga delata (Horn, 1887)
- Phyllophaga deleri Smith & Paulsen, 2015
- Phyllophaga delphinicauda Androw, 2016
- Phyllophaga delplanquei Chalumeau & Gruner, 1976
- Phyllophaga densata (Moser, 1918)
- Phyllophaga densepunctata (Moser, 1918)
- Phyllophaga densicollis (LeConte, 1863)
- Phyllophaga dentex (Bates, 1888)
- Phyllophaga denticulata (Blanchard, 1851)
- Phyllophaga dieteriana Deloya & Morón, 1998
- Phyllophaga diffinis (Blanchard, 1851)
- Phyllophaga diminuta Evans, 2003
- Phyllophaga disca Saylor, 1943
- Phyllophaga discalis Chapin, 1935
- Phyllophaga dispar (Burmeister, 1855)
- Phyllophaga disparilis (Horn, 1878)
- Phyllophaga disrupta Cockerell, 1927
- Phyllophaga dissimilis (Chevrolat, 1865)
- Phyllophaga divertens (Bates, 1888)
- Phyllophaga dominicensis Cartwright & Chalumeau, 1977
- Phyllophaga drakii (Kirby, 1837)
- Phyllophaga dsaimana Morón, 2003
- Phyllophaga dubitata Garcia-Vidal, 1978
- Phyllophaga duenas Saylor, 1941
- Phyllophaga dugesiana Morón & Rivera & Lopez, 2001
- Phyllophaga dulcis (Bates, 1887)
- Phyllophaga duncani (Barrett, 1933)
- Phyllophaga durango Saylor, 1940
- Phyllophaga durangoana (Moser, 1921)
- Phyllophaga durangosa Saylor, 1943
- Phyllophaga ecostata (Horn, 1887)
- Phyllophaga ecuadorae Blackwelder, 1944
- Phyllophaga edrileyi Morón, 2015
- Phyllophaga eladio Woodruff, 2005
- Phyllophaga elegans (Nonfried, 1891)
- Phyllophaga elenans Saylor, 1938
- Phyllophaga eligia Sanderson, 1958
- Phyllophaga elizoria Saylor, 1937
- Phyllophaga elongata (Linell, 1896)
- Phyllophaga emberae Morón, 2015
- Phyllophaga emburyi Saylor, 1938
- Phyllophaga eniba Saylor, 1943
- Phyllophaga ephilida (Say, 1825)
- Phyllophaga epigaea (Wickham, 1903)
- Phyllophaga epulara Sanderson, 1958
- Phyllophaga erota (Saylor, 1942)
- Phyllophaga errans (LeConte, 1860)
- Phyllophaga espina Sanderson, 1951
- Phyllophaga esquinada Sanderson, 1951
- Phyllophaga estacea Saylor, 1943
- Phyllophaga etabatesiana Morón, 1992
- Phyllophaga euryaspis (Bates, 1887)
- Phyllophaga exorata (Horn, 1887)
- Phyllophaga expansa Chapin, 1932
- Phyllophaga explanicollis Chapin, 1935
- Phyllophaga extincta (Wickham, 1916)
- Phyllophaga falcata Smith & Paulsen, 2015
- Phyllophaga falsa (LeConte, 1856)
- Phyllophaga falta (LeConte, 1856)
- Phyllophaga farcta (LeConte, 1856)
- Phyllophaga favosa Saylor, 1941
- Phyllophaga ferrugata (Moser, 1918)
- Phyllophaga ferruginea (Moser, 1918)
- Phyllophaga ferupilis Saylor, 1941
- Phyllophaga fervida (Fabricius, 1775)
- Phyllophaga fesina Saylor, 1948
- Phyllophaga fimbriata Chapin, 1932
- Phyllophaga fimbripes (LeConte, 1856)
- Phyllophaga fissilabris (Bates, 1887)
- Phyllophaga flavidopilosa (Moser, 1921)
- Phyllophaga flavipennis (Horn, 1885)
- Phyllophaga floridana Robinson, 1938
- Phyllophaga foralita Saylor, 1938
- Phyllophaga forbesi Glasgow, 1916
- Phyllophaga forcipata (Burmeister, 1855)
- Phyllophaga forsteri (Burmeister, 1855)
- Phyllophaga fossoria Sanderson, 1951
- Phyllophaga foveicollis (Bates, 1887)
- Phyllophaga foxii Davis, 1920
- Phyllophaga fragilipennis (Blanchard, 1851)
- Phyllophaga franciscana Garcia-Vidal, 1984
- Phyllophaga fraterna Harris, 1842
- Phyllophaga fraternaria Cano & Morón, 2002
- Phyllophaga freeborni Saylor, 1937
- Phyllophaga fucata (Horn, 1887)
- Phyllophaga fulvipennis (Blanchard, 1851)
- Phyllophaga fulviventris (Moser, 1918)
- Phyllophaga fusca (Frölich, 1792) (northern June beetle)
- Phyllophaga fuscipennis (Moser, 1918)
- Phyllophaga futilis (LeConte, 1850) (lesser June beetle)

=== G–I ===
- Phyllophaga gaigei Sanderson, 1948
- Phyllophaga galeanae Saylor, 1943
- Phyllophaga garrota Sanderson, 1951
- Phyllophaga gastonguzmani Morón, 2016
- Phyllophaga gaumeri (Bates, 1889)
- Phyllophaga gentryi (Saylor, 1936)
- Phyllophaga georgiana (Horn, 1885)
- Phyllophaga ghentata (Saylor, 1937)
- Phyllophaga gigantissima Saylor, 1935
- Phyllophaga ginigra Saylor, 1940
- Phyllophaga glaberrima (Blanchard, 1851)
- Phyllophaga glabricula (LeConte, 1856)
- Phyllophaga gloriae Morón, 2013
- Phyllophaga godwini Morón & Riley, 2005
- Phyllophaga gonzalffteri Morón, 2012
- Phyllophaga gracilis (Burmeister, 1855)
- Phyllophaga gracillima (Von Dalle Torre, 1912)
- Phyllophaga gramma Morón & Woodruff, 2014
- Phyllophaga grancha Saylor, 1948
- Phyllophaga granti Saylor, 1940
- Phyllophaga gravidula (Moser, 1921)
- Phyllophaga grossepunctata (Moser, 1918)
- Phyllophaga guanacasteca Morón & Solis, 2000
- Phyllophaga guanicana Smyth, 1917
- Phyllophaga guapilana Saylor, 1935
- Phyllophaga guapiles Saylor, 1941
- Phyllophaga guapilesea Saylor, 1941
- Phyllophaga guapoloides Morón & Solis, 2001
- Phyllophaga guatemala (Saylor, 1940)
- Phyllophaga guerrocans Saylor, 1938
- Phyllophaga haagi Saylor, 1943
- Phyllophaga haitiensis Woodruff, 2005
- Phyllophaga halffteriana Morón, 1992
- Phyllophaga hamata (Horn, 1887)
- Phyllophaga hardyi Garcia-Vidal, 1984
- Phyllophaga hemilissa (Bates, 1887)
- Phyllophaga herminiae Hernández-Cruz, Morón & Sánchez-García, 2015
- Phyllophaga hernandezi Garcia-Vidal, 1984
- Phyllophaga herrerana Morón, 2017
- Phyllophaga heteroclita (Burmeister, 1855)
- Phyllophaga heteronycha (Bates, 1887)
- Phyllophaga hidalgoana Saylor, 1943
- Phyllophaga hintonella Saylor, 1941
- Phyllophaga hintoni Saylor, 1935
- Phyllophaga hirsuta (Knoch, 1801)
- Phyllophaga hirticollis (Moser, 1921)
- Phyllophaga hirticula (Knoch, 1801)
- Phyllophaga hirtifrons (Moser, 1921)
- Phyllophaga hirtiventris (Horn, 1887)
- Phyllophaga hoegei (Bates, 1887)
- Phyllophaga hoegella Saylor, 1943
- Phyllophaga hoffmanitae Morón, 1996
- Phyllophaga hogardi (Blanchard, 1851)
- Phyllophaga holguinensis Smith & Paulsen, 2015
- Phyllophaga hondura Saylor, 1943
- Phyllophaga hondurasana (Moser, 1921)
- Phyllophaga hoogstraali Saylor, 1943
- Phyllophaga hornii (Smith, 1889)
- Phyllophaga howdeniana Morón, 1992
- Phyllophaga howdenryi Morón & Maes, 2014
- Phyllophaga huachuca Saylor, 1940
- Phyllophaga hubbelli Cartwright, 1946
- Phyllophaga huiteaca Morón, 2006
- Phyllophaga humboldtiana Morón, 2003
- Phyllophaga idonea Sanderson, 1948
- Phyllophaga ignava (Horn, 1887)
- Phyllophaga ilicis (Knoch, 1801)
- Phyllophaga imeldae Morón, 2017
- Phyllophaga imitans Frey, 1975
- Phyllophaga imitatrix Chapin, 1932
- Phyllophaga impar Davis, 1920
- Phyllophaga implicita (Horn, 1887)
- Phyllophaga impressipyga Frey, 1975
- Phyllophaga imprima Sanderson, 1951
- Phyllophaga incuria Sanderson, 1942
- Phyllophaga independentista Garcia-Vidal, 1984
- Phyllophaga inepta (Horn, 1887)
- Phyllophaga infidelis (Horn, 1887)
- Phyllophaga inflativentris (Moser, 1918)
- Phyllophaga inflexa Barrett, 1935
- Phyllophaga instabilis Blackwelder, 1944
- Phyllophaga insulaepinora Garcia-Vidal, 1978
- Phyllophaga insulana (Moser, 1918)
- Phyllophaga insularis Smyth, 1917
- Phyllophaga integra (Say, 1835)
- Phyllophaga integriceps (Moser, 1918)
- Phyllophaga inversa (Horn, 1887)
- Phyllophaga invisa Riley & Wolfe, 1997
- Phyllophaga irazuana Saylor, 1936
- Phyllophaga isabellae Morón & Rivera, 2001
- Phyllophaga itsmica Morón, 2000
- Phyllophaga iviei Chalumeau, 1985
- Phyllophaga izabalana Morón, 2003
- Phyllophaga izucarana Morón & Aragon, 1997

=== J–L ===
- Phyllophaga jalisciensis Morón & Rivera & Lopez, 2001
- Phyllophaga jamaicana (Moser, 1918)
- Phyllophaga janzeniana Morón & Solis, 2000
- Phyllophaga jaragua Woodruff, 2005
- Phyllophaga jaronua Chapin, 1932
- Phyllophaga javepacuana Morón, 2003
- Phyllophaga jeanmathieui Morón & Woodruff, 2014
- Phyllophaga jiminezi Woodruff & Sanderson, 2005
- Phyllophaga jorgevaldezi Hernández-Cruz, Morón & Sánchez-García, 2015
- Phyllophaga josepalaciosi Morón & Nogueira, 2012
- Phyllophaga jovelana Morón & Cano, 2000
- Phyllophaga joyana Morón & Rivera & Lopez, 2001
- Phyllophaga jumberea (Saylor, 1942)
- Phyllophaga juquilana Morón, 2000
- Phyllophaga juvenilis (Fall, 1932)
- Phyllophaga karlsioei (Linell, 1898)
- Phyllophaga kayaumariana Morón & Nogueira, 2014
- Phyllophaga kenscoffi Wolcott, 1928
- Phyllophaga kentuckiana Ritcher, 1937
- Phyllophaga knausi (Schaeffer, 1907)
- Phyllophaga knausii (Schaeffer, 1907)
- Phyllophaga knochi (Gyllenhal, 1817)
- Phyllophaga knochii (Schönherr and Gyllenhal, 1817)
- Phyllophaga koehleriana Saylor, 1940
- Phyllophaga kohlmanniana Morón & Solis, 2000
- Phyllophaga kulzeri Frey, 1975
- Phyllophaga kuntzeni (Moser, 1921)
- Phyllophaga laboriosa Garcia-Vidal, 1988
- Phyllophaga labrata Chapin, 1932
- Phyllophaga lacroixi Paulian, 1947
- Phyllophaga laevigata Blanchard, 1851
- Phyllophaga lalanza Saylor, 1941
- Phyllophaga laminata (Moser, 1921)
- Phyllophaga lanata (Blanchard, 1851)
- Phyllophaga lanceolata (Say, 1824)
- Phyllophaga lanepta (Saylor, 1937)
- Phyllophaga laportaei (Blanchard, 1851)
- Phyllophaga laportei Blanchard, 1851
- Phyllophaga larimar Woodruff, 2005
- Phyllophaga latefissa (Moser, 1918)
- Phyllophaga latens (Arrow, 1900)
- Phyllophaga latidens (Schaeffer, 1906)
- Phyllophaga latifrons (LeConte, 1856)
- Phyllophaga latipes Bates, 1887
- Phyllophaga latiungula Wolcott, 1928
- Phyllophaga lebasii (Blanchard, 1851)
- Phyllophaga lempira Morón & Robbins, 2004
- Phyllophaga lenis (Horn, 1887)
- Phyllophaga leonilae Morón, 1995
- Phyllophaga leonina (Bates, 1887)
- Phyllophaga leporina (Erichson, 1848)
- Phyllophaga leprieuri (Blanchard, 1851)
- Phyllophaga leptospica Sanderson, 1951
- Phyllophaga lineata (Bates, 1887)
- Phyllophaga lineatoides Morón, 2000
- Phyllophaga linharesensis Frey, 1975
- Phyllophaga lobata (Fall, 1908)
- Phyllophaga lodingi Sanderson, 1939
- Phyllophaga longicornis (Blanchard, 1851)
- Phyllophaga longifoliata (Moser, 1921)
- Phyllophaga longispina (Smith, 1889)
- Phyllophaga longitarsa (Say, 1824)
- Phyllophaga lorencita Morón & Solis, 2001
- Phyllophaga lota Luginbill, 1928
- Phyllophaga loxichana Morón, 2017
- Phyllophaga luctuosa (Horn, 1887)
- Phyllophaga luginbilli Saylor, 1941
- Phyllophaga lulaana Morón, 2000
- Phyllophaga luridipennis (Moser, 1918)

=== M ===
- Phyllophaga macasana (Moser, 1921)
- Phyllophaga macgregori Morón, 2004
- Phyllophaga macmurryi Saylor, 1940
- Phyllophaga macrocera (Bates, 1887)
- Phyllophaga macrophylla (Bates, 1887)
- Phyllophaga maculicollis (LeConte, 1863)
- Phyllophaga maestrensis Garcia-Vidal, 1984
- Phyllophaga magnicornis (Moser, 1921)
- Phyllophaga mali Wolcott, 1928
- Phyllophaga manantleca Morón & Rivera & Lopez, 2001
- Phyllophaga manaosana (Moser, 1924)
- Phyllophaga manchesterea Saylor, 1940
- Phyllophaga mandevillea Saylor, 1940
- Phyllophaga manibota Smith & Paulsen, 2015
- Phyllophaga marcano Woodruff, 2005
- Phyllophaga marcapatana (Moser, 1918)
- Phyllophaga marginalis (LeConte, 1856)
- Phyllophaga mariaegalante Chalumeau & Gruner, 1976
- Phyllophaga mariana Fall, 1929
- Phyllophaga marilucasana Cano & Morón, 2002
- Phyllophaga marina Garcia-Vidal, 1987
- Phyllophaga martiana Saylor, 1943
- Phyllophaga martincampoi Morón & Aragon-Garcia, 2012
- Phyllophaga martinezi Frey, 1975
- Phyllophaga martinezpalaciosi Morón, 1989
- Phyllophaga matacapana Morón, 2003
- Phyllophaga maxima Bates, 1887
- Phyllophaga meadei Saylor, 1940
- Phyllophaga mella Sanderson, 1951
- Phyllophaga menetriesi (Blanchard, 1851)
- Phyllophaga mentalis Saylor, 1941
- Phyllophaga mesophylla Morón & Rivera, 1992
- Phyllophaga mexicana (Blanchard, 1851)
- Phyllophaga micans (Knoch, 1801)
- Phyllophaga michelbacheri Saylor, 1940
- Phyllophaga microcera (Arrow, 1933)
- Phyllophaga microcerus (Arrow, 1933)
- Phyllophaga microchaeta (Moser, 1924)
- Phyllophaga microphylla (Moser, 1918)
- Phyllophaga micros (Bates, 1888)
- Phyllophaga microsoma Chapin, 1932
- Phyllophaga migratoria Garcia-Vidal, 1984
- Phyllophaga mimicana Saylor, 1938
- Phyllophaga minutissima Wolcott, 1928
- Phyllophaga miraflora Saylor, 1940
- Phyllophaga misteca (Bates, 1888)
- Phyllophaga mitlana Saylor, 1943
- Phyllophaga moei Saylor, 1938
- Phyllophaga molopia (Bates, 1888)
- Phyllophaga monana (Moser, 1921)
- Phyllophaga monrosi Frey, 1975
- Phyllophaga monstrosa (Saylor, 1935)
- Phyllophaga montserratensis (Arrow, 1920)
- Phyllophaga morganella Saylor, 1942
- Phyllophaga morgani Saylor, 1938
- Phyllophaga moserella Morón, 2016
- Phyllophaga moseri Frey, 1965
- Phyllophaga mucorea (LeConte, 1856)
- Phyllophaga munizi Morón, 2008
- Phyllophaga murina (Burmeister, 1855)
- Phyllophaga muwieriana Morón & Nogueira, 2014

=== N–O ===
- Phyllophaga nahui Morón & Solis, 1994
- Phyllophaga nandalumia Morón & Riley, 2005
- Phyllophaga naranjina Morón & Solis, 2001
- Phyllophaga nasalis Chapin, 1935
- Phyllophaga navassa (Woodruff & Steiner, 2011)
- Phyllophaga navidad Morón & Woodruff, 2008
- Phyllophaga nebulosa Polihronakis, 2007
- Phyllophaga necaxa Saylor, 1943
- Phyllophaga neglecta (Blanchard, 1851)
- Phyllophaga neomexicana Saylor, 1940
- Phyllophaga nepida Saylor, 1941
- Phyllophaga nevermannea Saylor, 1941
- Phyllophaga nevermanni Saylor, 1935
- Phyllophaga nevomeana Morón, 2006
- Phyllophaga nigerrima (Bates, 1887)
- Phyllophaga nigrita (Moser, 1918)
- Phyllophaga nigropicea (Walker, 1866)
- Phyllophaga niquirana Moron, 1990
- Phyllophaga nisuens (Saylor, 1937)
- Phyllophaga nitida (LeConte, 1856)
- Phyllophaga nitidicauda (Arrow, 1913)
- Phyllophaga nitidicollis (Blanchard, 1851)
- Phyllophaga nitididorsis Frey, 1975
- Phyllophaga nogales Saylor, 1940
- Phyllophaga nogueirana Morón, 2002
- Phyllophaga nosa Blackwelder, 1944
- Phyllophaga nubipennis Bates, 1887
- Phyllophaga nuda (Moser, 1918)
- Phyllophaga nudipennis Frey, 1975
- Phyllophaga nunezi Woodruff, 2005
- Phyllophaga oaxaca Saylor, 1940
- Phyllophaga oaxena Saylor, 1940
- Phyllophaga obliquestriata Saylor, 1938
- Phyllophaga oblongula Bates, 1887
- Phyllophaga obsoleta (Blanchard, 1851)
- Phyllophaga ocozocuana Morón, 2003
- Phyllophaga odomi Saylor, 1943
- Phyllophaga ohausi (Moser, 1921)
- Phyllophaga okeechobea Robinson, 1948
- Phyllophaga omani Sanderson, 1937
- Phyllophaga ome Morón, 1991
- Phyllophaga omiltemia Bates, 1889
- Phyllophaga onchophora Chapin, 1932
- Phyllophaga onita Saylor, 1941
- Phyllophaga onoreana Morón, 2003
- Phyllophaga opaca (Moser, 1918)
- Phyllophaga opacicollis (Horn, 1878)
- Phyllophaga orosina (Moser, 1918)
- Phyllophaga ortizi Woodruff, 2005
- Phyllophaga ovalis (Cartwright, 1939)

=== P ===
- Phyllophaga pachuca Saylor, 1943
- Phyllophaga pachypyga (Burmeister, 1855)
- Phyllophaga pallida (Horn, 1885)
- Phyllophaga pallidicornis (Moser, 1921)
- Phyllophaga pameana Morón, 2000
- Phyllophaga panamana Chapin, 1935
- Phyllophaga panamensis (Moser, 1921)
- Phyllophaga panicula Sanderson, 1951
- Phyllophaga panorpa Sanderson, 1950
- Phyllophaga papaloana Morón, 2001
- Phyllophaga paraguayana (Moser, 1921)
- Phyllophaga paraguayensis (Moser, 1918)
- Phyllophaga parallela (Blanchard, 1851)
- Phyllophaga parcesetifera Chapin, 1935
- Phyllophaga parilis (Bates, 1888)
- Phyllophaga parumpunctata (Bates, 1887)
- Phyllophaga parvicornis (Moser, 1924)
- Phyllophaga parvidens (LeConte, 1856)
- Phyllophaga parvisetis (Bates, 1887)
- Phyllophaga pastassana (Moser, 1924)
- Phyllophaga paternoi Glasgow, 1925
- Phyllophaga patruelis (Chevrolat, 1865)
- Phyllophaga patrueloides Paulian, 1947
- Phyllophaga pauliani Chalumeau & Gruner, 1976
- Phyllophaga pauloensis Frey, 1975
- Phyllophaga pearliae Davis, 1920
- Phyllophaga peccata Blackwelder, 1944
- Phyllophaga pectoralis (Blanchard, 1851)
- Phyllophaga pedernales Woodruff, 2005
- Phyllophaga penaella Frey, 1975
- Phyllophaga peninsulana (Moser, 1918)
- Phyllophaga peninsularis Saylor, 1940
- Phyllophaga pentaphylla (Bates, 1888)
- Phyllophaga perfidia Smith & Paulsen, 2015
- Phyllophaga perlonga Davis, 1920
- Phyllophaga permagna (Moser, 1918)
- Phyllophaga persimilis Chapin, 1935
- Phyllophaga personata Chapin, 1935
- Phyllophaga peruana (Moser, 1918)
- Phyllophaga picadoana Morón & Solis, 2000
- Phyllophaga picea (Blanchard, 1851)
- Phyllophaga piceola (Bates, 1887)
- Phyllophaga picipennis (Moser, 1918)
- Phyllophaga piligera (Moser, 1918)
- Phyllophaga piliventris (Moser, 1918)
- Phyllophaga pilosipes Saylor, 1940
- Phyllophaga pilositarsis Blackwelder, 1944
- Phyllophaga pilosula (Moser, 1918)
- Phyllophaga pilotoensis Garcia-Vidal, 1987
- Phyllophaga pilula (Moser, 1921)
- Phyllophaga pinophilus Morón & Woodruff, 2014
- Phyllophaga plaei (Blanchard, 1851)
- Phyllophaga plairi (Saylor, 1937)
- Phyllophaga planeta Reinhard, 1950
- Phyllophaga platti Saylor, 1935
- Phyllophaga platyrhina (Bates, 1887)
- Phyllophaga plena (Fall, 1932)
- Phyllophaga pleroma Reinhard, 1940
- Phyllophaga poculifer (Bates, 1887)
- Phyllophaga pokornyiana Morón, 1995
- Phyllophaga polita (Harold, 1869)
- Phyllophaga polyphylla (Bates, 1887)
- Phyllophaga postrema (Horn, 1887)
- Phyllophaga poterillosa Saylor, 1942
- Phyllophaga potosisalta Morón & Woodruff, 2008
- Phyllophaga potrerillo Garcia-Vidal, 1987
- Phyllophaga praesidii (Bates, 1888)
- Phyllophaga praetermissa (Horn, 1887)
- Phyllophaga probaporra Sanderson, 1951
- Phyllophaga profunda (Blanchard, 1851)
- Phyllophaga prolixa (Bates, 1887)
- Phyllophaga propinqua (Moser, 1918)
- Phyllophaga pruinipennis (Moser, 1918)
- Phyllophaga pruinosa (Blanchard, 1851)
- Phyllophaga prunina (LeConte, 1856)
- Phyllophaga prununculina (Burmeister, 1855)
- Phyllophaga pseudoatra Morón, 2003
- Phyllophaga pseudocalcaris Saylor, 1940
- Phyllophaga pseudocarus Morón, 1999
- Phyllophaga pseudofloridana Woodruff and Beck, 1989
- Phyllophaga pseudomicans Chapin, 1935
- Phyllophaga psiloptera Sanderson, 1939
- Phyllophaga puberea (Mannerheim, 1829)
- Phyllophaga puberula (Jacquelin Du Val, 1856)
- Phyllophaga pubescens (Burmeister, 1855)
- Phyllophaga pubicauda (Bates, 1887)
- Phyllophaga pubicollis (Blanchard, 1851)
- Phyllophaga pudorosa Reinhard, 1939
- Phyllophaga puerilis Wickham, 1914
- Phyllophaga pulcher (Linell, 1896)
- Phyllophaga punctipennis (Blanchard, 1851)
- Phyllophaga punctulata (Blanchard, 1851)
- Phyllophaga punctuliceps Bates, 1887
- Phyllophaga punctulicollis (Bates, 1887)
- Phyllophaga puntarenosa Morón & Solis, 2001
- Phyllophaga pusillidens Fall, 1937

=== Q–R ===
- Phyllophaga quadriphylla Saylor, 1943
- Phyllophaga querca (Knoch, 1801)
- Phyllophaga quercus (Knoch, 1801)
- Phyllophaga quetzala Morón, 2001
- Phyllophaga quetzaloides Morón, 2001
- Phyllophaga quetzalpoa Morón, 2015
- Phyllophaga quiana Morón, 2003
- Phyllophaga quituana Morón, 2015
- Phyllophaga rafaelamothei Morón, 2016
- Phyllophaga rangelana Chapin, 1935
- Phyllophaga ratcliffeiana Morón, 1992
- Phyllophaga ravida (Blanchard, 1851)
- Phyllophaga rawlinsi Woodruff, 2005
- Phyllophaga raydoma (Saylor, 1943)
- Phyllophaga recorta Sanderson, 1951
- Phyllophaga reevesi Saylor, 1939
- Phyllophaga regiomontana Morón, 2001
- Phyllophaga reinhardi Saylor, 1940
- Phyllophaga renodis Reinhard, 1939
- Phyllophaga reticulata Frey, 1975
- Phyllophaga reventazona Saylor, 1936
- Phyllophaga rex Woodruff & Sanderson, 2005
- Phyllophaga reyescastilloi Morón, 2013
- Phyllophaga reyesiana Morón, 1992
- Phyllophaga reyesolivasi Morón, Lugo-García & Aragón-García, 2015
- Phyllophaga riverana Morón, 2004
- Phyllophaga riviera Reinhard, 1950
- Phyllophaga roberterroni Morón, 2017
- Phyllophaga rodriguezi Bates, 1889
- Phyllophaga rolbakeri Saylor, 1940
- Phyllophaga rolstoni Riley & Wolfe, 1997
- Phyllophaga romana Saylor, 1946
- Phyllophaga rorida (Burmeister, 1855)
- Phyllophaga rorulenta (Burmeister, 1855)
- Phyllophaga roscida (Burmeister, 1855)
- Phyllophaga rossi Saylor, 1939
- Phyllophaga rostrypyga (Bates, 1888)
- Phyllophaga rubiginosa (LeConte, 1856)
- Phyllophaga rubricosa Reinhard, 1939
- Phyllophaga ruficollis (Moser, 1915)
- Phyllophaga rufipes (Moser, 1924)
- Phyllophaga rufithorax (Moser, 1921)
- Phyllophaga rufiventris (Kirsch, 1885)
- Phyllophaga rufotestacea (Moser, 1918)
- Phyllophaga rugicollis (Bates, 1887)
- Phyllophaga rugipennis (Schaufuss, 1858)
- Phyllophaga rugithorax Saylor, 1938
- Phyllophaga rugosa (Melsheimer, 1845) (rugose June beetle)
- Phyllophaga rugulosa (Blanchard, 1851)
- Phyllophaga rustica Woodruff, 2005
- Phyllophaga rzedowskiana Aragon & Morón, 2003

=== S ===
- Phyllophaga sacoma Reinhard, 1939
- Phyllophaga saginata (Mannerheim, 1829)
- Phyllophaga sahagundinoi Morón, 2015
- Phyllophaga saltana Frey, 1975
- Phyllophaga sanbarthensis Chalumeau & Gruner, 1976
- Phyllophaga sanctipauli (Blanchard, 1851)
- Phyllophaga sandersoni Garcia-Vidal, 1988
- Phyllophaga sandersoniana Morón, 1992
- Phyllophaga sandersoniella Chalumeau & Gruner, 1976
- Phyllophaga santachloe Woodruff, 2005
- Phyllophaga santaclarae Chapin, 1932
- Phyllophaga santiagozai Morón, 2011
- Phyllophaga santiaguensis Garcia-Vidal, 1987
- Phyllophaga sarlacca Smith & Paulsen, 2015
- Phyllophaga saylori Sanderson, 1965
- Phyllophaga sayloriana Morón & Rivera & Lopez, 2001
- Phyllophaga scabrifrons (Bates, 1887)
- Phyllophaga scabripyga Bates, 1887
- Phyllophaga scaramuzzai Garcia-Vidal, 1988
- Phyllophaga schaefferi Saylor, 1937
- Phyllophaga schenklingi Moser, 1918
- Phyllophaga schizorhina (Bates, 1887)
- Phyllophaga schizorhinoides Morón, 2003
- Phyllophaga schneblei Frey, 1975
- Phyllophaga schusteriana (Cano & Morón, 2002)
- Phyllophaga schwarzi Chapin, 1932
- Phyllophaga scissa (Bates, 1887)
- Phyllophaga scitula (Horn, 1887)
- Phyllophaga scoparia (LeConte, 1856)
- Phyllophaga scuticeps (Bates, 1888)
- Phyllophaga secessicola Smith & Paulsen, 2015
- Phyllophaga segregans (Bates, 1888)
- Phyllophaga senex (Horn, 1878)
- Phyllophaga senicula (Bates, 1887)
- Phyllophaga sequoiana Saylor, 1936
- Phyllophaga sericata (Erichson, 1848)
- Phyllophaga serrana Morón & Cano, 2000
- Phyllophaga serratipes Morón & Cano, 2000
- Phyllophaga setifera (Burmeister, 1855)
- Phyllophaga sibonyensis Garcia-Vidal, 1988
- Phyllophaga signaticollis (Burmeister, 1855)
- Phyllophaga sinaloana Saylor, 1935
- Phyllophaga sinicollis Saylor, 1943
- Phyllophaga sinuaticeps (Moser, 1921)
- Phyllophaga skelleyi Woodruff and Beck, 1989
- Phyllophaga smithi (Arrow, 1912)
- Phyllophaga snowi Saylor, 1940
- Phyllophaga sociata (Horn, 1878)
- Phyllophaga sodalis Reinhard, 1940
- Phyllophaga sodialis Reinhard, 1940
- Phyllophaga solanophaga Morón, 1988
- Phyllophaga solavegana Morón, 2000
- Phyllophaga solisiana Morón, 2003
- Phyllophaga sonora Saylor, 1939
- Phyllophaga soror Davis, 1920
- Phyllophaga spaethi (Nonfried, 1891)
- Phyllophaga speculifera (Chevrolat, 1865)
- Phyllophaga spinicola Garcia-Vidal, 1984
- Phyllophaga spinifemora Saylor, 1940
- Phyllophaga spinitarsis (Moser, 1921)
- Phyllophaga spreta (Horn, 1887)
- Phyllophaga squamifera Frey, 1976
- Phyllophaga squamipilosa Saylor, 1937
- Phyllophaga stehlei Chalumeau, 1985
- Phyllophaga stipitalis (Blanchard, 1851)
- Phyllophaga stohleri Saylor, 1938
- Phyllophaga straminea (Bates, 1887)
- Phyllophaga sturmi (Bates, 1887)
- Phyllophaga stzotzilana Morón, 2001
- Phyllophaga submetallica (Bates, 1887)
- Phyllophaga submucida (LeConte, 1856)
- Phyllophaga subnitida (Moser, 1918)
- Phyllophaga subopaca (Moser, 1918)
- Phyllophaga subpruinosa (Casey, 1884)
- Phyllophaga subrugosa (Moser, 1924)
- Phyllophaga subspinosa (Harris, 1826)
- Phyllophaga subtonsa (LeConte, 1856)
- Phyllophaga suriana Morón, 2002
- Phyllophaga suttonana Reinhard, 1939
- Phyllophaga suturalis (Chevrolat, 1865)
- Phyllophaga sylvatica Sanderson, 1942

=== T ===
- Phyllophaga tajimaroana Morón, 2000
- Phyllophaga talamancana Morón & Solis, 2001
- Phyllophaga tamatziana Morón & Nogueira, 2014
- Phyllophaga tancitara Saylor, 1943
- Phyllophaga tapantina Morón & Solis, 2001
- Phyllophaga tarsalis (Schaeffer, 1908)
- Phyllophaga tascatensis Morón, Lugo-García & Aragón-García, 2015
- Phyllophaga taxodii Langston, 1924
- Phyllophaga tecta Cartwright, 1944
- Phyllophaga tegenara Saylor, 1935
- Phyllophaga tegulicollis Saylor, 1934
- Phyllophaga tejupana Morón, 2000
- Phyllophaga tejupilcas Saylor, 1943
- Phyllophaga temascalis Saylor, 1941
- Phyllophaga temascaltepeca Saylor, 1934
- Phyllophaga temaxa Saylor, 1940
- Phyllophaga temora Saylor, 1943
- Phyllophaga tenuipilis (Bates, 1887)
- Phyllophaga teosinteophaga Morón & Rivera, 1992
- Phyllophaga tepanana Saylor, 1938
- Phyllophaga tepequetzala Morón, 2015
- Phyllophaga terezinae Frey, 1965
- Phyllophaga terminalis Saylor, 1935
- Phyllophaga tesorito Vallejo & Wolff, 2013
- Phyllophaga tetracera Chapin, 1932
- Phyllophaga tetraphylla (Moser, 1918)
- Phyllophaga texensis Saylor, 1940
- Phyllophaga thoracica (Burmeister, 1855)
- Phyllophaga tilarana Morón & Solis, 2001
- Phyllophaga timida (Horn, 1878)
- Phyllophaga tlamana Morón, 2016
- Phyllophaga tlanchinolensis Morón, 2000
- Phyllophaga tojolabala Morón, 1999
- Phyllophaga toni Woodruff, 2005
- Phyllophaga torta (LeConte, 1856)
- Phyllophaga totonis Saylor, 1941
- Phyllophaga totoreana Morón, 2006
- Phyllophaga trichoderma (Moser, 1921)
- Phyllophaga trichodes (Bates, 1890)
- Phyllophaga tridens (Bates, 1887)
- Phyllophaga tridilonycha Saylor, 1943
- Phyllophaga trinitariensis Garcia-Vidal, 1987
- Phyllophaga tristis (Fabricius, 1781)
- Phyllophaga triticophaga Morón & Salvadori, 1998
- Phyllophaga trochanter Saylor, 1940
- Phyllophaga tsajumiana Morón, 2001
- Phyllophaga tuberculifrons (Chevrolat, 1865)
- Phyllophaga tumulosa Bates, 1887
- Phyllophaga tusa (Horn, 1887)
- Phyllophaga tuxtleca Morón, 2003
- Phyllophaga tzintzontliana Morón, 1992

=== U–Z ===
- Phyllophaga ueiacayoca Morón, 1992
- Phyllophaga ulkei (Smith, 1889)
- Phyllophaga umbrosa (Erichson, 1847)
- Phyllophaga uniformis (Blanchard, 1851)
- Phyllophaga uruguayana (Saylor, 1935)
- Phyllophaga valeriana Saylor, 1934
- Phyllophaga valia Saylor, 1940
- Phyllophaga vallendensis Morón, 2013
- Phyllophaga vandinei Smyth, 1917
- Phyllophaga vandykei Saylor, 1935
- Phyllophaga varohiana Morón, 2006
- Phyllophaga vazquezae Morón, 1995
- Phyllophaga vehemens (Horn, 1887)
- Phyllophaga velezangeli Morón & Neita-Moreno, 2014
- Phyllophaga venodiola Saylor, 1948
- Phyllophaga vermiculata Chapin, 1932
- Phyllophaga verruciventris (Moser, 1918)
- Phyllophaga vestita (Moser, 1918)
- Phyllophaga vetula (Horn, 1887)
- Phyllophaga vexata (Horn, 1885)
- Phyllophaga vicina (Moser, 1918)
- Phyllophaga vilifrons (LeConte, 1856)
- Phyllophaga villaclarensis Garcia-Vidal, 1987
- Phyllophaga villardoi Morón & Ordóñez-Reséndiz, 2015
- Phyllophaga villifrons (LeConte, 1856)
- Phyllophaga violetae Morón & Aragon-Garcia, 2012
- Phyllophaga vulpes (Arrow, 1913)
- Phyllophaga wickhami Saylor, 1940
- Phyllophaga wittkugeli (Nonfried, 1891)
- Phyllophaga wolcotti Saylor, 1940
- Phyllophaga xalacoatepecana Morón, 2015
- Phyllophaga xanthe (Bates, 1888)
- Phyllophaga xanthocoma (Bates, 1887)
- Phyllophaga xerophila Saylor, 1939
- Phyllophaga xkumuka Morón, 1999
- Phyllophaga yaqui Saylor, 1940
- Phyllophaga yaxbitana Morón, 2000
- Phyllophaga yei Morón, 1991
- Phyllophaga yemasseei Cartwright, 1944
- Phyllophaga yoloxana Morón, 2003
- Phyllophaga youngi Cartwright, 1935
- Phyllophaga yucana Saylor, 1937
- Phyllophaga yunqueana Chapin, 1935
- Phyllophaga zacaquetzala Morón, 2015
- Phyllophaga zaragozana Morón, 2003
- Phyllophaga zarcoana Morón, 2003
- Phyllophaga zavalana Reinhard, 1946
- Phyllophaga zayasi Garcia-Vidal, 1978
- Phyllophaga zeteki Saylor, 1942
- Phyllophaga zunilensis Bates, 1887
- Phyllophaga zunimarioi Morón & Maes, 2014
