= Phyllophaga nebulosa =

Scientific classification
- Kingdom: Animalia
- Phylum: Arthropoda
- Class: Insecta
- Order: Coleoptera
- Suborder: Polyphaga
- Infraorder: Scarabaeiformia
- Family: Scarabaeidae
- Genus: Phyllophaga
- Species: P. nebulosa

Binomial name
- Phyllophaga nebulosa Polihronakis, 2007

Species of beetle

Phyllophaga nebulosa is a species of June beetle endemic to Jones Lake State Park in North Carolina. This species was discovered by Maxi Polihronakis at Jones Lake State Park when she could not recognize some of the beetles she had collected for her research. This beetle is nocturnal and was discovered living in sandy soil near conifers, which is unusual for members of its genus.

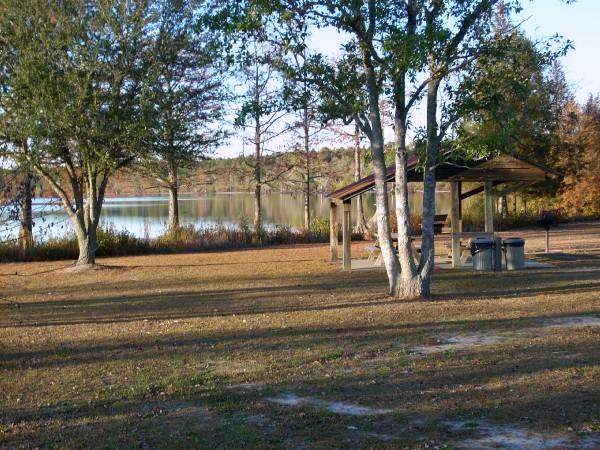
Jones Lake State Park, where the beetle was discovered

The generic name "Phyllophaga" comes from the Greek words phyllon (φυλλον), which means "leaf", and phagos(φαγος), which means "eater", with a feminine ending. The specific name, nebulosa, comes from the Latin "nebul," which means mist. This beetle is a member of the Phyllophaga fraterna species complex and is distinguishable from the other members by its distinctive genitalia in both the male and female specimens.
