= Phyllophaga mucorea =

Scientific classification
- Kingdom: Animalia
- Phylum: Arthropoda
- Class: Insecta
- Order: Coleoptera
- Suborder: Polyphaga
- Infraorder: Scarabaeiformia
- Family: Scarabaeidae
- Genus: Phyllophaga
- Species: P. mucorea

Binomial name
- Phyllophaga mucorea (LeConte, 1856)

Synonyms
- Listrochelus obtusus LeConte, 1856; Listrochelus texanus LeConte, 1856

Species of beetle

Phyllophaga mucorea is a species of scarab beetle in the family Scarabaeidae.
