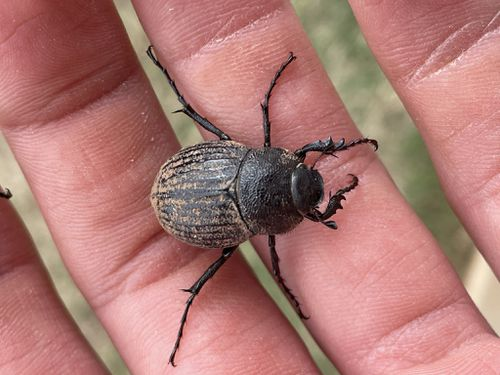

Scientific classification
- Kingdom: Animalia
- Phylum: Arthropoda
- Class: Insecta
- Order: Coleoptera
- Suborder: Polyphaga
- Infraorder: Scarabaeiformia
- Family: Scarabaeidae
- Genus: Phyllophaga
- Species: P. cribrosa

Binomial name
- Phyllophaga cribrosa (LeConte, 1853)

Synonyms
- Tostegoptera ventricosa LeConte, 1854

= Phyllophaga cribrosa =

Species of beetle

Phyllophaga cribrosa is a species of scarab beetle in the family Scarabaeidae. It is found in Central America and North America.
