= Phyllophaga scitula =

Scientific classification
- Kingdom: Animalia
- Phylum: Arthropoda
- Class: Insecta
- Order: Coleoptera
- Suborder: Polyphaga
- Infraorder: Scarabaeiformia
- Family: Scarabaeidae
- Genus: Phyllophaga
- Species: P. scitula

Binomial name
- Phyllophaga scitula (Horn, 1887)

Species of beetle

Phyllophaga scitula is a species of scarab beetle in the family Scarabaeidae. It is found in North America.
