= Phyllophaga apicata =

Scientific classification
- Kingdom: Animalia
- Phylum: Arthropoda
- Class: Insecta
- Order: Coleoptera
- Suborder: Polyphaga
- Infraorder: Scarabaeiformia
- Family: Scarabaeidae
- Genus: Phyllophaga
- Species: P. apicata

Binomial name
- Phyllophaga apicata Reinhard, 1939

Species of beetle

Phyllophaga apicata is a species of scarab beetle in the family Scarabaeidae.
