= Phyllophaga crinita =

Scientific classification
- Kingdom: Animalia
- Phylum: Arthropoda
- Class: Insecta
- Order: Coleoptera
- Suborder: Polyphaga
- Infraorder: Scarabaeiformia
- Family: Scarabaeidae
- Genus: Phyllophaga
- Species: P. crinita

Binomial name
- Phyllophaga crinita (Burmeister, 1855)

Synonyms
- Lachnosterna glabripennis LeConte, 1856; Listrochelus longiclavus Fall, 1922

Species of beetle

Phyllophaga crinita is a species of scarab beetle in the family Scarabaeidae. It is found in Central America.
