= Phyllophaga vilifrons =

Scientific classification
- Kingdom: Animalia
- Phylum: Arthropoda
- Class: Insecta
- Order: Coleoptera
- Suborder: Polyphaga
- Infraorder: Scarabaeiformia
- Family: Scarabaeidae
- Genus: Phyllophaga
- Species: P. vilifrons

Binomial name
- Phyllophaga vilifrons (LeConte, 1856)

Synonyms
- Lachnosterna hirticeps LeConte, 1856

Species of beetle

Phyllophaga vilifrons is a species of scarab beetle in the family Scarabaeidae.
