= Phyllophaga torta =

Scientific classification
- Kingdom: Animalia
- Phylum: Arthropoda
- Class: Insecta
- Order: Coleoptera
- Suborder: Polyphaga
- Infraorder: Scarabaeiformia
- Family: Scarabaeidae
- Genus: Phyllophaga
- Species: P. torta

Binomial name
- Phyllophaga torta (LeConte, 1856)

Synonyms
- Lachnosterna dampfi Arrow, 1933

Species of beetle

Phyllophaga torta is a species of scarab beetle in the family Scarabaeidae. It is found in Central America and North America.
