= Phyllophaga futilis =

Scientific classification
- Kingdom: Animalia
- Phylum: Arthropoda
- Class: Insecta
- Order: Coleoptera
- Suborder: Polyphaga
- Infraorder: Scarabaeiformia
- Family: Scarabaeidae
- Genus: Phyllophaga
- Species: P. futilis

Binomial name
- Phyllophaga futilis (LeConte, 1850)

Synonyms
- Ancylonycha gibbosa Burmeister, 1855; Lachnosterna decidua LeConte, 1856; Lachnosterna serricornis LeConte, 1856

Species of beetle

Phyllophaga futilis, the lesser June beetle, is a species of scarab beetle in the family Scarabaeidae. It is found in North America.
