= Phyllophaga fusca =

Scientific classification
- Kingdom: Animalia
- Phylum: Arthropoda
- Class: Insecta
- Order: Coleoptera
- Suborder: Polyphaga
- Infraorder: Scarabaeiformia
- Family: Scarabaeidae
- Genus: Phyllophaga
- Species: P. fusca

Binomial name
- Phyllophaga fusca (Frölich, 1792)

Synonyms
- Melolontha fervens Gyllenhal, 1817

Species of beetle

Phyllophaga fusca, the northern June beetle, is a species of scarab beetle in the family Scarabaeidae. It is found in North America.
