= Phyllophaga parvidens =

Scientific classification
- Kingdom: Animalia
- Phylum: Arthropoda
- Class: Insecta
- Order: Coleoptera
- Suborder: Polyphaga
- Infraorder: Scarabaeiformia
- Family: Scarabaeidae
- Genus: Phyllophaga
- Species: P. parvidens

Binomial name
- Phyllophaga parvidens (LeConte, 1856)

Species of beetle

Phyllophaga parvidens is a species of scarab beetle in the family Scarabaeidae. It is found in North America.

== Subspecies ==
These two subspecies belong to the species Phyllophaga parvidens:

- Phyllophaga parvidens hysteropyga Davis, 1920
- Phyllophaga parvidens parvidens (LeConte, 1856)
