= Phyllophaga beckeri =

Scientific classification
- Kingdom: Animalia
- Phylum: Arthropoda
- Class: Insecta
- Order: Coleoptera
- Suborder: Polyphaga
- Infraorder: Scarabaeiformia
- Family: Scarabaeidae
- Genus: Phyllophaga
- Species: P. beckeri

Binomial name
- Phyllophaga beckeri (Moser, 1921)

Synonyms
- Phyllophaga inopia Sanderson, 1942

Species of beetle

Phyllophaga beckeri is a species of scarab beetle in the family Scarabaeidae. It is found in Central America and North America.
