= Phyllophaga uniformis =

Scientific classification
- Kingdom: Animalia
- Phylum: Arthropoda
- Class: Insecta
- Order: Coleoptera
- Suborder: Polyphaga
- Infraorder: Scarabaeiformia
- Family: Scarabaeidae
- Genus: Phyllophaga
- Species: P. uniformis

Binomial name
- Phyllophaga uniformis (Blanchard, 1851)

Synonyms
- Lachnosterna carolina Fall, 1912

Species of beetle

Phyllophaga uniformis is a species of scarab beetle in the family Scarabaeidae. It is found in North America.
