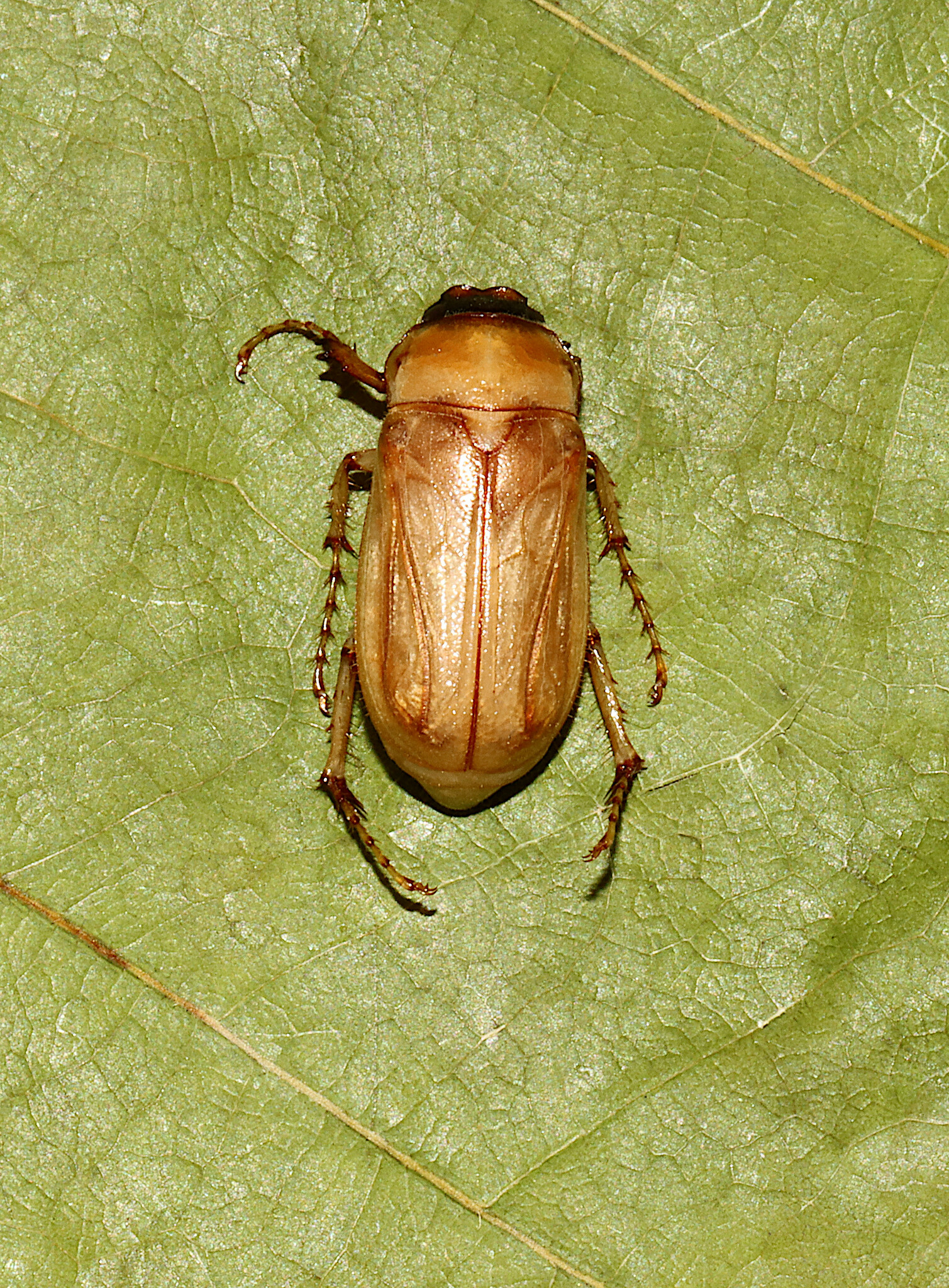

Scientific classification
- Kingdom: Animalia
- Phylum: Arthropoda
- Class: Insecta
- Order: Coleoptera
- Suborder: Polyphaga
- Infraorder: Scarabaeiformia
- Family: Scarabaeidae
- Genus: Phyllophaga
- Species: P. longitarsa

Binomial name
- Phyllophaga longitarsa (Say, 1824)

Synonyms
- Lachnosterna frontalis LeConte, 1856

= Phyllophaga longitarsa =

Species of beetle

Phyllophaga longitarsa is a species of May beetle or junebug in the family Scarabaeidae. It is found in North America.
