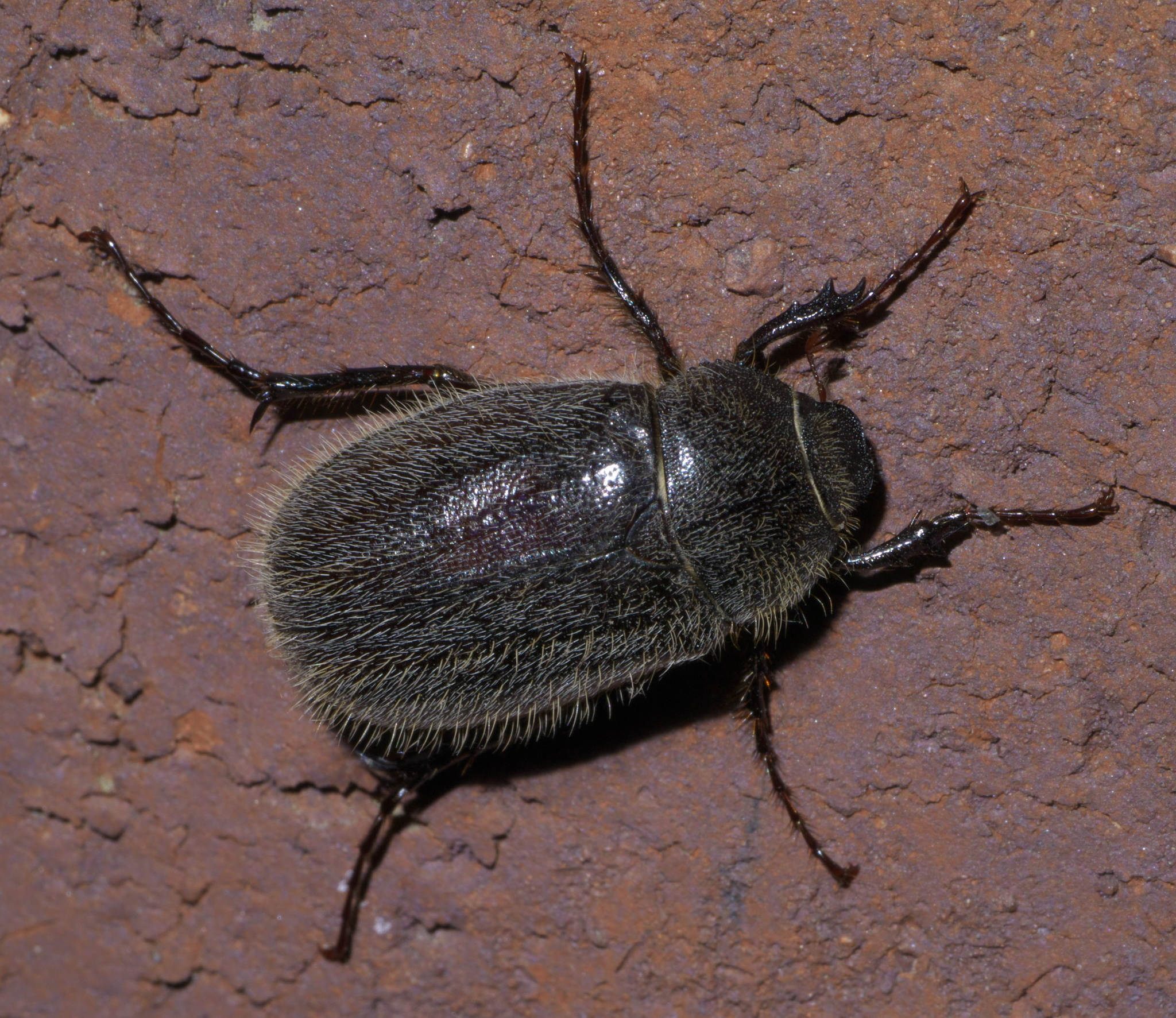
- Phyllophaga crenulata, Oklahoma

Scientific classification
- Kingdom: Animalia
- Phylum: Arthropoda
- Class: Insecta
- Order: Coleoptera
- Suborder: Polyphaga
- Infraorder: Scarabaeiformia
- Family: Scarabaeidae
- Genus: Phyllophaga
- Species: P. crenulata

Binomial name
- Phyllophaga crenulata (Frölich, 1792)

Synonyms
- Melolontha georgicana Gyllenhal, 1817

= Phyllophaga crenulata =

Species of beetle

Phyllophaga crenulata is a species of scarab beetle in the family Scarabaeidae. It is found in North America.

P. crenulata is known for being hairy and most commonly found in the Eastern United States and Canada.
