= Phyllophaga opaca =

Scientific classification
- Kingdom: Animalia
- Phylum: Arthropoda
- Clade: Pancrustacea
- Class: Insecta
- Order: Coleoptera
- Suborder: Polyphaga
- Infraorder: Scarabaeiformia
- Family: Scarabaeidae
- Tribe: Melolonthini
- Genus: Phyllophaga
- Species: P. opaca

Binomial name
- Phyllophaga opaca (Moser, 1918)

Synonyms
- Phyllophaga iroides Fall, 1929

Species of beetle

Phyllophaga opaca is a species of scarab beetle in the family Scarabaeidae. It is found in Central America and North America.
