= Phyllophaga crassissima =

Scientific classification
- Kingdom: Animalia
- Phylum: Arthropoda
- Class: Insecta
- Order: Coleoptera
- Suborder: Polyphaga
- Infraorder: Scarabaeiformia
- Family: Scarabaeidae
- Genus: Phyllophaga
- Species: P. crassissima

Binomial name
- Phyllophaga crassissima (Blanchard, 1851)

Synonyms
- Lachnosterna generosa Horn, 1887; Lachnosterna obesa LeConte, 1856; Lachnosterna robusta LeConte, 1856

Species of beetle

Phyllophaga crassissima is a species of scarab beetle in the family Scarabaeidae. It is found in North America.
