= Phyllophaga gracilis =

Scientific classification
- Kingdom: Animalia
- Phylum: Arthropoda
- Class: Insecta
- Order: Coleoptera
- Suborder: Polyphaga
- Infraorder: Scarabaeiformia
- Family: Scarabaeidae
- Genus: Phyllophaga
- Species: P. gracilis

Binomial name
- Phyllophaga gracilis (Burmeister, 1855)

Synonyms
- Endrosa volvula LeConte, 1856; Lachnosterna inana LeConte, 1856; Phyllophaga angulata Glasgow, 1925

Species of beetle

Phyllophaga gracilis is a species of scarab beetle in the family Scarabaeidae. It is found in North America.

== Subspecies ==
These two subspecies belong to the species Phyllophaga gracilis:

- Phyllophaga gracilis angulata Glasgow, 1925
- Phyllophaga gracilis gracilis
