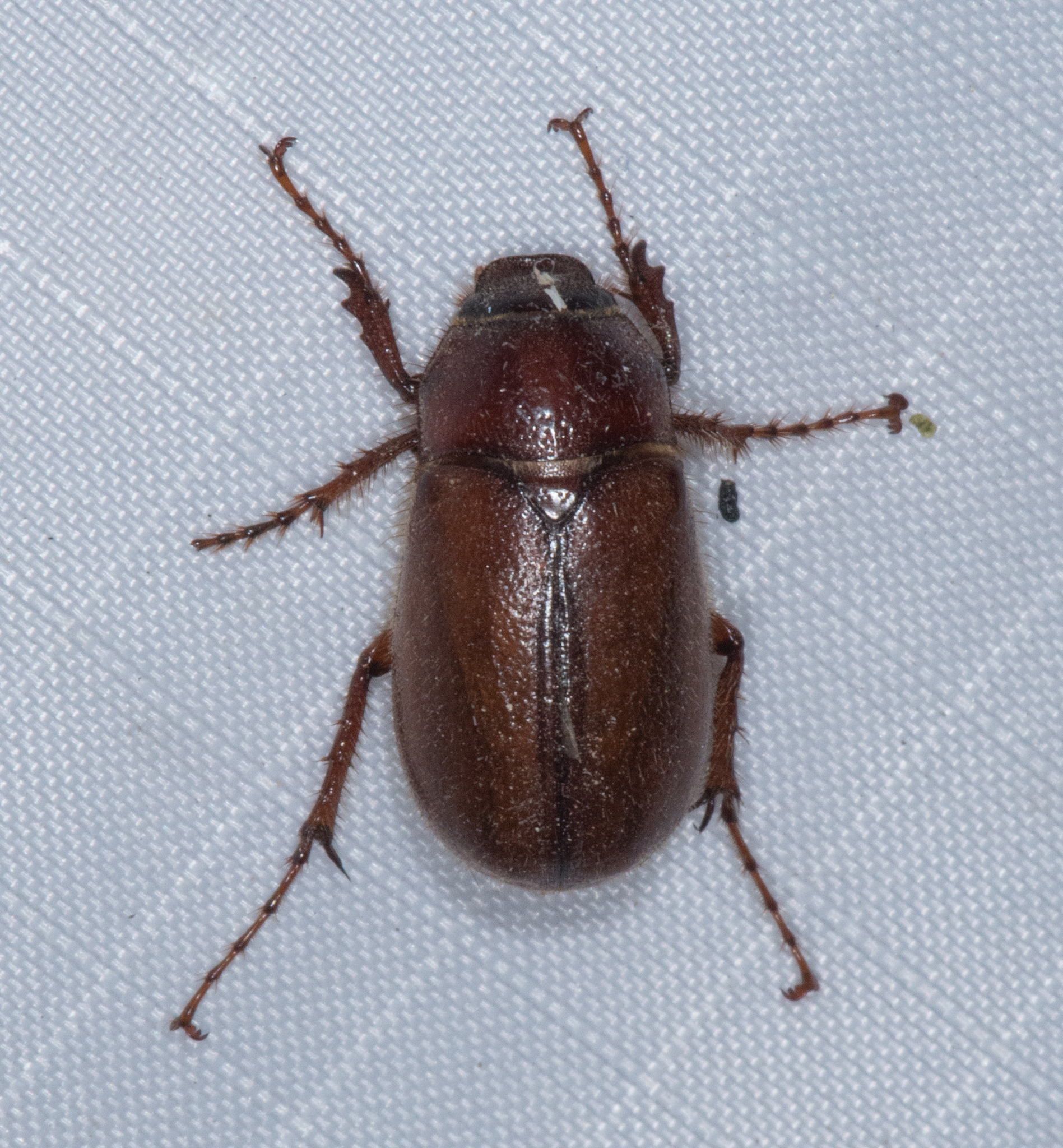

Scientific classification
- Kingdom: Animalia
- Phylum: Arthropoda
- Clade: Pancrustacea
- Class: Insecta
- Order: Coleoptera
- Suborder: Polyphaga
- Infraorder: Scarabaeiformia
- Family: Scarabaeidae
- Genus: Phyllophaga
- Species: P. dentex

Binomial name
- Phyllophaga dentex (Bates, 1888)

= Phyllophaga dentex =

Species of beetle

Phyllophaga dentex is a species of scarab beetle in the family Scarabaeidae. It is found in Central America and North America.
