= Phyllophaga rugosa =

Scientific classification
- Kingdom: Animalia
- Phylum: Arthropoda
- Clade: Pancrustacea
- Class: Insecta
- Order: Coleoptera
- Suborder: Polyphaga
- Infraorder: Scarabaeiformia
- Family: Scarabaeidae
- Genus: Phyllophaga
- Species: P. rugosa

Binomial name
- Phyllophaga rugosa (Melsheimer, 1845)

Species of beetle

Phyllophaga rugosa, the rugose June beetle (commonly known as rugose June bug), is a species of scarab beetle in the family Scarabaeidae. It is found in North America.

It is one of the most common June beetle (also called June bug) species all across North America.
