= Phyllophaga vexata =

Scientific classification
- Kingdom: Animalia
- Phylum: Arthropoda
- Class: Insecta
- Order: Coleoptera
- Suborder: Polyphaga
- Infraorder: Scarabaeiformia
- Family: Scarabaeidae
- Genus: Phyllophaga
- Species: P. vexata

Binomial name
- Phyllophaga vexata (Horn, 1885)

Species of beetle

Phyllophaga vexata is a species of scarab beetle in the family Scarabaeidae.

== Subspecies ==
These two subspecies belong to the species Phyllophaga vexata:

- Phyllophaga vexata unituberculata Bates, 1889
- Phyllophaga vexata vexata (Horn, 1885)
