= Phyllophaga tristis =

Scientific classification
- Kingdom: Animalia
- Phylum: Arthropoda
- Clade: Pancrustacea
- Class: Insecta
- Order: Coleoptera
- Suborder: Polyphaga
- Infraorder: Scarabaeiformia
- Family: Scarabaeidae
- Tribe: Melolonthini
- Genus: Phyllophaga
- Species: P. tristis

Binomial name
- Phyllophaga tristis (Fabricius, 1781)

Species of beetle

Phyllophaga tristis, the tristis complex, is a species of scarab beetle in the family Scarabaeidae.

== Subspecies ==
These three subspecies belong to the species Phyllophaga tristis:

- Phyllophaga tristis amplicornis Reinhard, 1939
- Phyllophaga tristis suttonana Reinhard, 1939
- Phyllophaga tristis tristis (Fabricius, 1781)
