= Phyllophaga vetula =

Scientific classification
- Kingdom: Animalia
- Phylum: Arthropoda
- Class: Insecta
- Order: Coleoptera
- Suborder: Polyphaga
- Infraorder: Scarabaeiformia
- Family: Scarabaeidae
- Genus: Phyllophaga
- Species: P. vetula

Binomial name
- Phyllophaga vetula (Horn, 1887)

Synonyms
- Lachnosterna longipilosa Bates, 1888

Species of beetle

Phyllophaga vetula is a species of scarab beetle in the family Scarabaeidae. It lives in Central America and North America.
