= Phyllophaga ilicis =

Scientific classification
- Kingdom: Animalia
- Phylum: Arthropoda
- Class: Insecta
- Order: Coleoptera
- Suborder: Polyphaga
- Infraorder: Scarabaeiformia
- Family: Scarabaeidae
- Genus: Phyllophaga
- Species: P. ilicis

Binomial name
- Phyllophaga ilicis (Knoch, 1801)

Synonyms
- Ancylonycha fimbriata Burmeister, 1855; Lachnosterna ciliata LeConte, 1856; Melolontha porcina Hentz, 1830; Phyllophaga jonesi Sanderson, 1939

Species of beetle

Phyllophaga ilicis is a species of scarab beetle in the family Scarabaeidae. It is found in North America.
