= Phyllophaga arcta =

Scientific classification
- Kingdom: Animalia
- Phylum: Arthropoda
- Class: Insecta
- Order: Coleoptera
- Suborder: Polyphaga
- Infraorder: Scarabaeiformia
- Family: Scarabaeidae
- Genus: Phyllophaga
- Species: P. arcta

Binomial name
- Phyllophaga arcta (Horn, 1887)

Synonyms
- Phyllophaga opacita Reinhard, 1939

Species of beetle

Phyllophaga arcta is a species of scarab beetle in the family Scarabaeidae. It is normally found in North America.
