= Phyllophaga longispina =

Scientific classification
- Kingdom: Animalia
- Phylum: Arthropoda
- Class: Insecta
- Order: Coleoptera
- Suborder: Polyphaga
- Infraorder: Scarabaeiformia
- Family: Scarabaeidae
- Genus: Phyllophaga
- Species: P. longispina

Binomial name
- Phyllophaga longispina (Smith, 1889)

Species of beetle

Phyllophaga longispina is a species of scarab beetle in the family Scarabaeidae. It is found in North America.
