= Phyllophaga tarsalis =

Scientific classification
- Kingdom: Animalia
- Phylum: Arthropoda
- Class: Insecta
- Order: Coleoptera
- Suborder: Polyphaga
- Infraorder: Scarabaeiformia
- Family: Scarabaeidae
- Genus: Phyllophaga
- Species: P. tarsalis

Binomial name
- Phyllophaga tarsalis (Schaeffer, 1908)

Species of beetle

Phyllophaga tarsalis is a species in the genus Phyllophaga ("May beetles"), in the subfamily Melolonthinae ("May beetles and junebugs"). It is found in North America.
