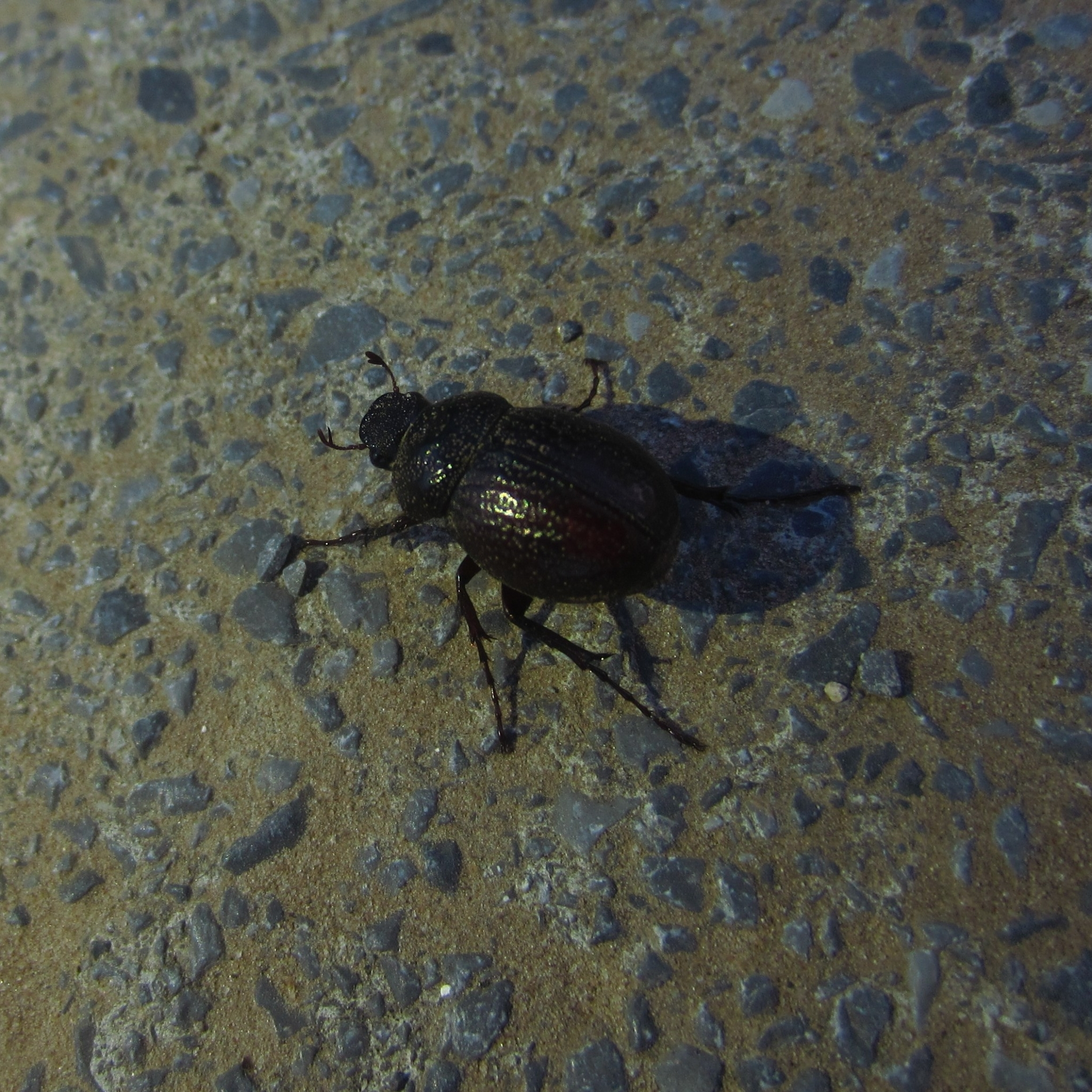

Scientific classification
- Kingdom: Animalia
- Phylum: Arthropoda
- Clade: Pancrustacea
- Class: Insecta
- Order: Coleoptera
- Suborder: Polyphaga
- Infraorder: Scarabaeiformia
- Family: Scarabaeidae
- Tribe: Melolonthini
- Genus: Phyllophaga
- Species: P. zavalana

Binomial name
- Phyllophaga zavalana Reinhard, 1946

= Phyllophaga zavalana =

Species of beetle

Phyllophaga zavalana, the zavala phyllophaga, is a species of scarab beetle in the family Scarabaeidae. It is found in North America.
