= Phyllophaga koehleriana =

Scientific classification
- Kingdom: Animalia
- Phylum: Arthropoda
- Class: Insecta
- Order: Coleoptera
- Suborder: Polyphaga
- Infraorder: Scarabaeiformia
- Family: Scarabaeidae
- Genus: Phyllophaga
- Species: P. koehleriana

Binomial name
- Phyllophaga koehleriana Saylor, 1940

Species of beetle

Phyllophaga koehleriana is a species of scarab beetle in the family Scarabaeidae.
