= Phyllophaga congrua =

Scientific classification
- Kingdom: Animalia
- Phylum: Arthropoda
- Class: Insecta
- Order: Coleoptera
- Suborder: Polyphaga
- Infraorder: Scarabaeiformia
- Family: Scarabaeidae
- Genus: Phyllophaga
- Species: P. congrua

Binomial name
- Phyllophaga congrua (LeConte, 1856)

Species of beetle

Phyllophaga congrua is a species of scarab beetle in the family Scarabaeidae. It is found in North America. The larvae of Phyllophaga congrua contribute to soil aeration and nutrient cycling. This activity, while beneficial for soil structure, can negatively impact crops, making them both beneficial and occasionally harmful in agricultural ecosystems.
