= Phyllophaga hirticula =

Scientific classification
- Kingdom: Animalia
- Phylum: Arthropoda
- Class: Insecta
- Order: Coleoptera
- Suborder: Polyphaga
- Infraorder: Scarabaeiformia
- Family: Scarabaeidae
- Genus: Phyllophaga
- Species: P. hirticula

Binomial name
- Phyllophaga hirticula (Knoch, 1801)

Species of beetle

Phyllophaga hirticula is a species of scarab beetle in the family Scarabaeidae. It is found in North America.

== Subspecies ==
These two subspecies belong to the species Phyllophaga hirticula:

- Phyllophaga hirticula comosa Davis, 1920^{i c g}
- Phyllophaga hirticula hirticula (Knoch, 1801)^{i g}

Data sources: i = ITIS, c = Catalogue of Life, g = GBIF, b = Bugguide.net
