= Phyllophaga juvenilis =

Scientific classification
- Kingdom: Animalia
- Phylum: Arthropoda
- Class: Insecta
- Order: Coleoptera
- Suborder: Polyphaga
- Infraorder: Scarabaeiformia
- Family: Scarabaeidae
- Genus: Phyllophaga
- Species: P. juvenilis

Binomial name
- Phyllophaga juvenilis (Fall, 1932)

Synonyms
- Phyllophaga seri Morón, 2002

Species of beetle

Phyllophaga juvenilis is a species of scarab beetle in the family Scarabaeidae.
