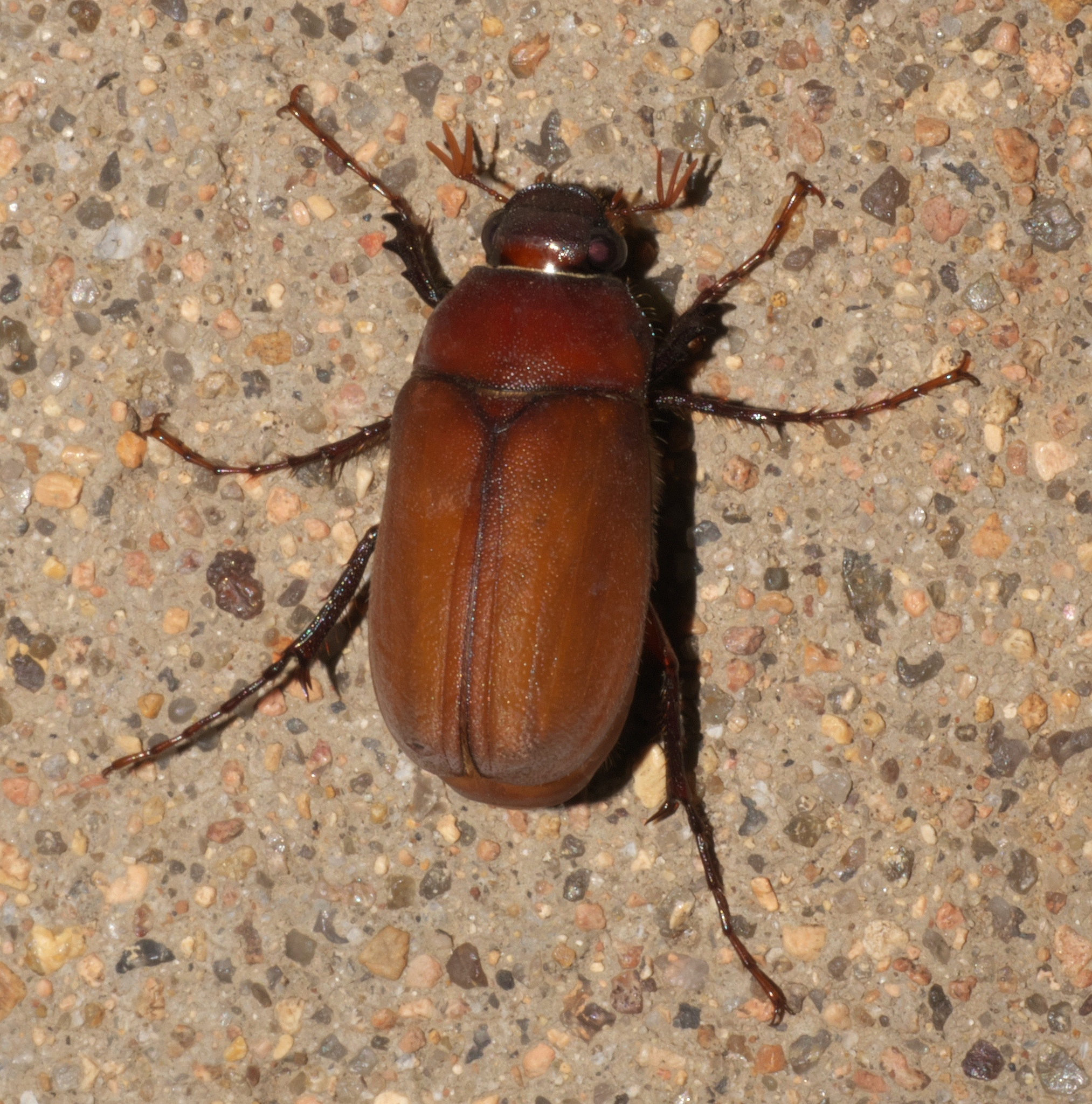
- Phyllophaga submucida, Texas

Scientific classification
- Kingdom: Animalia
- Phylum: Arthropoda
- Class: Insecta
- Order: Coleoptera
- Suborder: Polyphaga
- Infraorder: Scarabaeiformia
- Family: Scarabaeidae
- Genus: Phyllophaga
- Species: P. submucida

Binomial name
- Phyllophaga submucida (LeConte, 1856)

= Phyllophaga submucida =

Species of beetle

Phyllophaga submucida is a species of scarab beetle in the family Scarabaeidae. It is found in Central America and North America.
