= Phyllophaga debilis =

Scientific classification
- Kingdom: Animalia
- Phylum: Arthropoda
- Class: Insecta
- Order: Coleoptera
- Suborder: Polyphaga
- Infraorder: Scarabaeiformia
- Family: Scarabaeidae
- Genus: Phyllophaga
- Species: P. debilis

Binomial name
- Phyllophaga debilis (LeConte, 1856)

Synonyms
- Phyllophaga austricolia Fall, 1929

Species of beetle

Phyllophaga debilis is a species of scarab beetle in the family Scarabaeidae.
