= Phyllophaga luctuosa =

Scientific classification
- Kingdom: Animalia
- Phylum: Arthropoda
- Class: Insecta
- Order: Coleoptera
- Suborder: Polyphaga
- Infraorder: Scarabaeiformia
- Family: Scarabaeidae
- Genus: Phyllophaga
- Species: P. luctuosa

Binomial name
- Phyllophaga luctuosa (Horn, 1887)

Synonyms
- Lachnosterna rugosioides Linell, 1896

Species of beetle

Phyllophaga luctuosa is a species of scarab beetle in the family Scarabaeidae.
