= Phyllophaga reticulata =

Scientific classification
- Kingdom: Animalia
- Phylum: Arthropoda
- Class: Insecta
- Order: Coleoptera
- Suborder: Polyphaga
- Infraorder: Scarabaeiformia
- Family: Scarabaeidae
- Genus: Phyllophaga
- Species: P. reticulata

Binomial name
- Phyllophaga reticulata Frey, 1975

Species of beetle

Phyllophaga reticulata is a species of beetle of the family Scarabaeidae. It is found in Mexico (Jalisco).

== Description ==
Adults reach a length of about 13–14 mm. The upper and lower surfaces are yellowish-brown, with the head and pronotum and sometimes also the elytra darker. The upper surface is slightly shiny, almost dull. The head has very scattered, solitary, erect setae, while the pronotum is fairly densely covered with long, erect, pale setae. The elytra are glabrous.
