= Phyllophaga micans =

Scientific classification
- Kingdom: Animalia
- Phylum: Arthropoda
- Class: Insecta
- Order: Coleoptera
- Suborder: Polyphaga
- Infraorder: Scarabaeiformia
- Family: Scarabaeidae
- Genus: Phyllophaga
- Species: P. micans

Binomial name
- Phyllophaga micans (Knoch, 1801)

Species of beetle

Phyllophaga micans is a species in the family Scarabaeidae ("scarab beetles"), in the order Coleoptera ("beetles"). It is found in North America. Adults are 15–17mm long, dark colored with the appearance of a pale, dust-like coating, and feed on hardwood trees. It ranges from Connecticut and New York in the north, south to Georgia, and west to Kansas and Texas.
