= Phyllophaga implicita =

Scientific classification
- Kingdom: Animalia
- Phylum: Arthropoda
- Class: Insecta
- Order: Coleoptera
- Suborder: Polyphaga
- Infraorder: Scarabaeiformia
- Family: Scarabaeidae
- Genus: Phyllophaga
- Species: P. implicita

Binomial name
- Phyllophaga implicita (Horn, 1887)

Synonyms
- Lachnosterna minor Linell, 1896; Phyllophaga linelli Saylor, 1937

Species of beetle

Phyllophaga implicita is a species of May beetle or junebug in the family Scarabaeidae.
