= Phyllophaga floridana =

Scientific classification
- Kingdom: Animalia
- Phylum: Arthropoda
- Class: Insecta
- Order: Coleoptera
- Suborder: Polyphaga
- Infraorder: Scarabaeiformia
- Family: Scarabaeidae
- Genus: Phyllophaga
- Species: P. floridana

Binomial name
- Phyllophaga floridana Robinson, 1938

Species of beetle

Phyllophaga floridana is a species of scarab beetle in the family Scarabaeidae. It is found in North America, and most commonly in the peninsula of Florida and similar humid climates.
