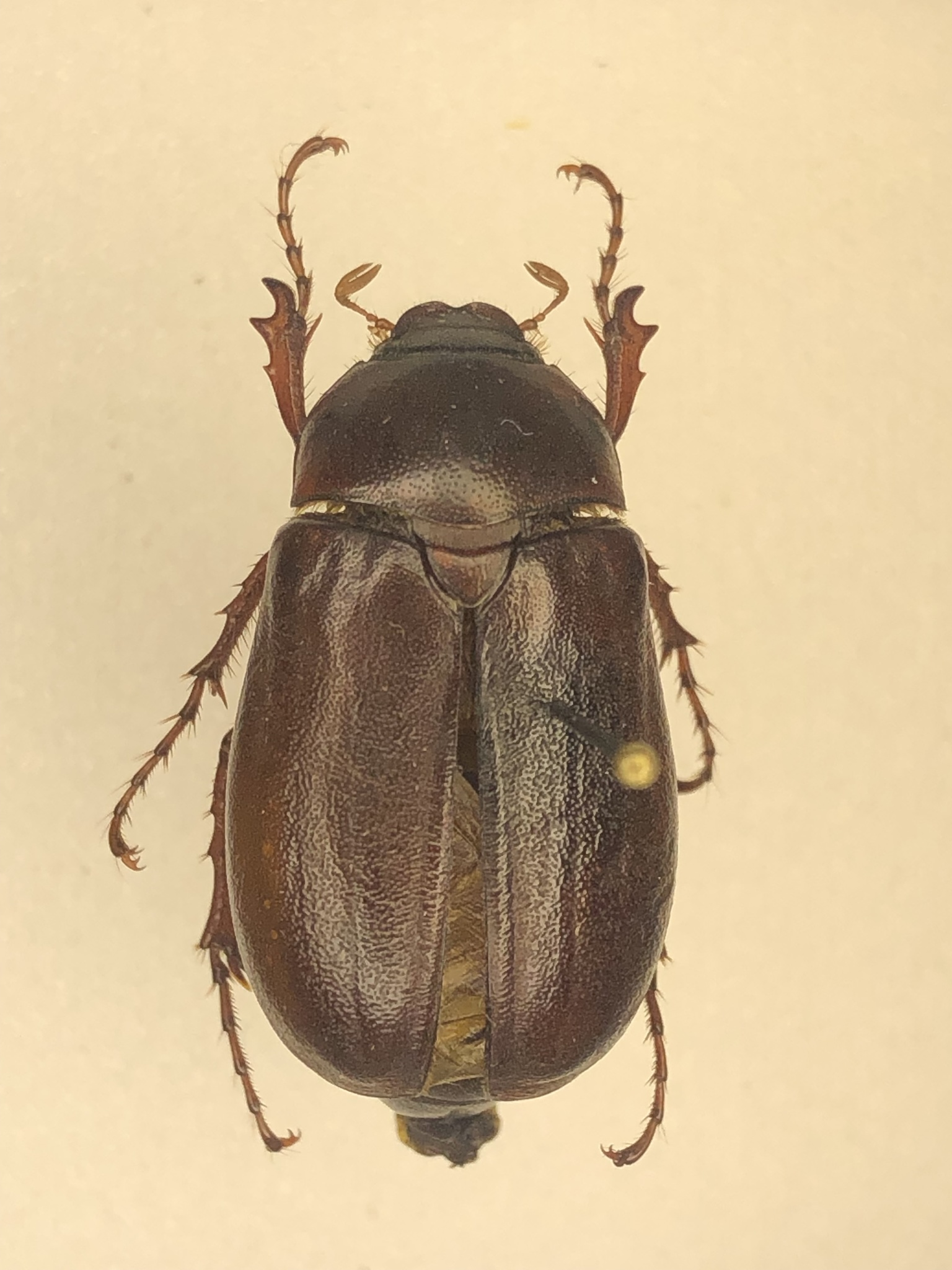

Scientific classification
- Kingdom: Animalia
- Phylum: Arthropoda
- Class: Insecta
- Order: Coleoptera
- Suborder: Polyphaga
- Infraorder: Scarabaeiformia
- Family: Scarabaeidae
- Genus: Phyllophaga
- Species: P. drakii

Binomial name
- Phyllophaga drakii (Kirby, 1837)

Synonyms
- Lachnosterna consimilis LeConte, 1850; Lachnosterna grandis Smith, 1888

= Phyllophaga drakii =

Species of beetle

Phyllophaga drakii is a species of scarab beetle in the family Scarabaeidae. It is found in North America.
