= Phyllophaga anxia =

Scientific classification
- Kingdom: Animalia
- Phylum: Arthropoda
- Class: Insecta
- Order: Coleoptera
- Suborder: Polyphaga
- Infraorder: Scarabaeiformia
- Family: Scarabaeidae
- Genus: Phyllophaga
- Species: P. anxia

Binomial name
- Phyllophaga anxia (LeConte, 1850)

Synonyms
- Ancylonycha brevicollis Blanchard, 1851; Ancylonycha guadulpensis Blanchard, 1851; Ancylonycha puncticollis Blanchard, 1851; Ancylonycha uninotata Walker, 1866; Lachnosterna alpina Linell, 1896; Lachnosterna cephalica LeConte, 1856; Lachnosterna dubia Smith, 1888; Lachnosterna insperata Smith, 1889

Species of beetle

Phyllophaga anxia, the forest-ogre June beetle, or cranberry white grub, is a species of scarab beetle in the family Scarabaeidae. It is found in North America.

== Description ==
Phyllophaga anxia is large (17.2 to 22.5mm) with a dark brown to black exoskeleton with ten antennomeres (the segments of the antennae).

== Habitat and range ==
Phyllophaga anxia is most commonly found in the United States, particularly the eastern half although they appear throughout the country, and parts of southern Canada. Within these areas, forest-ogre June beetle will often be found feeding off of host plants. The most common host plants will include: elm, willow, poplar, apple, cherry, box-elder, hackberry, linden, mountain ash, and oak.
