= Phyllophaga ephilida =

Scientific classification
- Kingdom: Animalia
- Phylum: Arthropoda
- Class: Insecta
- Order: Coleoptera
- Suborder: Polyphaga
- Infraorder: Scarabaeiformia
- Family: Scarabaeidae
- Genus: Phyllophaga
- Species: P. ephilida

Binomial name
- Phyllophaga ephilida (Say, 1825)

Species of beetle

Phyllophaga ephilida is a species of scarab beetle in the family Scarabaeidae. It is found in Central America and North America.

== Subspecies ==
These two subspecies belong to the species Phyllophaga ephilida:

- Phyllophaga ephilida ephilida (Say, 1825)
- Phyllophaga ephilida virilis Reinhard, 1939
