= Phyllophaga nitida =

Scientific classification
- Kingdom: Animalia
- Phylum: Arthropoda
- Class: Insecta
- Order: Coleoptera
- Suborder: Polyphaga
- Infraorder: Scarabaeiformia
- Family: Scarabaeidae
- Genus: Phyllophaga
- Species: P. nitida

Binomial name
- Phyllophaga nitida (LeConte, 1856)

Synonyms
- Lachnosterna innominata Smith, 1889; Lachnosterna limula Horn, 1887

Species of beetle

Phyllophaga nitida is a species of scarab beetle in the family Scarabaeidae. It is found in North America.
