= Phyllophaga forsteri =

Scientific classification
- Kingdom: Animalia
- Phylum: Arthropoda
- Class: Insecta
- Order: Coleoptera
- Suborder: Polyphaga
- Infraorder: Scarabaeiformia
- Family: Scarabaeidae
- Genus: Phyllophaga
- Species: P. forsteri

Binomial name
- Phyllophaga forsteri (Burmeister, 1855)

Synonyms
- Lachnosterna lugubris LeConte, 1856; Lachnosterna lutescens LeConte, 1856; Lachnosterna nova Smith, 1889; Lachnosterna politula Horn, 1887; Lachnosterna semicribrata LeConte, 1856

Species of beetle

Phyllophaga forsteri is a species of scarab beetle in the family Scarabaeidae. It is found in North America.
