= Phyllophaga forbesi =

Scientific classification
- Kingdom: Animalia
- Phylum: Arthropoda
- Class: Insecta
- Order: Coleoptera
- Suborder: Polyphaga
- Infraorder: Scarabaeiformia
- Family: Scarabaeidae
- Genus: Phyllophaga
- Species: P. forbesi

Binomial name
- Phyllophaga forbesi Glasgow, 1916

Species of beetle

Phyllophaga forbesi is a species of scarab beetle in the family Scarabaeidae. It is found in North America.
