= Phyllophaga prununculina =

Scientific classification
- Kingdom: Animalia
- Phylum: Arthropoda
- Class: Insecta
- Order: Coleoptera
- Suborder: Polyphaga
- Infraorder: Scarabaeiformia
- Family: Scarabaeidae
- Genus: Phyllophaga
- Species: P. prununculina

Binomial name
- Phyllophaga prununculina (Burmeister, 1855)

Synonyms
- Lachnosterna cerasina LeConte, 1856

Species of beetle

Phyllophaga prununculina is a species of scarab beetle in the family Scarabaeidae. It is found in North America.
