= Phyllophaga obsoleta =

Scientific classification
- Kingdom: Animalia
- Phylum: Arthropoda
- Class: Insecta
- Order: Coleoptera
- Suborder: Polyphaga
- Infraorder: Scarabaeiformia
- Family: Scarabaeidae
- Genus: Phyllophaga
- Species: P. obsoleta

Binomial name
- Phyllophaga obsoleta (Blanchard, 1851)

Synonyms
- Ancylonycha longicornis Burmeister, 1855; Phyllophaga mecocera Blackwelder, 1944; Phytalus laevigatus Blanchard, 1851; Phytalus longicornis Burmeister, 1855; Phytalus oxypygus Burmeister, 1855; Phytalus vanalleri Schaeffer, 1927

Species of beetle

Phyllophaga obsoleta is a species of scarab beetle in the family Scarabaeidae. It is found in Central America, North America, and South America.

== Subspecies ==
These three subspecies belong to the species Phyllophaga obsoleta:

- Phyllophaga obsoleta obsoleta
- Phyllophaga obsoleta vanalleri (Schaeffer, 1927)
- Phyllophaga obsoleta vanelleri
