= Phyllophaga latifrons =

Scientific classification
- Kingdom: Animalia
- Phylum: Arthropoda
- Class: Insecta
- Order: Coleoptera
- Suborder: Polyphaga
- Infraorder: Scarabaeiformia
- Family: Scarabaeidae
- Genus: Phyllophaga
- Species: P. latifrons

Binomial name
- Phyllophaga latifrons (LeConte, 1856)

Species of beetle

Phyllophaga latifrons is a species of May beetle or junebug in the family Scarabaeidae. It is found in North America.
