= Phyllophaga fervida =

Scientific classification
- Kingdom: Animalia
- Phylum: Arthropoda
- Class: Insecta
- Order: Coleoptera
- Suborder: Polyphaga
- Infraorder: Scarabaeiformia
- Family: Scarabaeidae
- Genus: Phyllophaga
- Species: P. fervida

Binomial name
- Phyllophaga fervida (Fabricius, 1775)

Synonyms
- Lachnosterna arcuata Smith, 1888; Melolontha quercina Knoch, 1801

Species of beetle

Phyllophaga fervida is a species of scarab beetle in the family Scarabaeidae. It is found in the Caribbean Sea and North America.
