= Phyllophaga marginalis =

Scientific classification
- Kingdom: Animalia
- Phylum: Arthropoda
- Class: Insecta
- Order: Coleoptera
- Suborder: Polyphaga
- Infraorder: Scarabaeiformia
- Family: Scarabaeidae
- Genus: Phyllophaga
- Species: P. marginalis

Binomial name
- Phyllophaga marginalis (LeConte, 1856)

Species of beetle

Phyllophaga marginalis is a species of scarab beetle in the family Scarabaeidae. It is found in North America.

== Subspecies ==
These two subspecies belong to the species Phyllophaga marginalis:

- Phyllophaga marginalis insolita Cartwright, 1944
- Phyllophaga marginalis marginalis (LeConte, 1856)
