= Phyllophaga bruneri =

Scientific classification
- Kingdom: Animalia
- Phylum: Arthropoda
- Class: Insecta
- Order: Coleoptera
- Suborder: Polyphaga
- Infraorder: Scarabaeiformia
- Family: Scarabaeidae
- Genus: Phyllophaga
- Species: P. bruneri

Binomial name
- Phyllophaga bruneri Chapin, 1932

Species of beetle

Phyllophaga bruneri, the Cuban May beetle, is a species of scarab beetle in the family Scarabaeidae. It is found in the Caribbean Sea and North America.
