= Phyllophaga fraterna =

Scientific classification
- Kingdom: Animalia
- Phylum: Arthropoda
- Class: Insecta
- Order: Coleoptera
- Suborder: Polyphaga
- Infraorder: Scarabaeiformia
- Family: Scarabaeidae
- Genus: Phyllophaga
- Species: P. fraterna

Binomial name
- Phyllophaga fraterna Harris, 1842

Species of beetle

Phyllophaga fraterna is a species of scarab beetle in the family Scarabaeidae. It is found in North America.

== Subspecies ==
These two subspecies belong to the species Phyllophaga fraterna:

- Phyllophaga fraterna fraterna Harris, 1842
- Phyllophaga fraterna mississippiensis Davis, 1920
