= Mircha =

Mircha Amir Chak, Kusi Khurd
- Village
- Interactive map of Mircha
- Coordinates: 25.403°N 83.650°E
- Country: India
- State: Uttar Pradesh
- District: Ghazipur
- Established: 1685; 341 years ago
- Founder: Diler Khan

Area
  - Total: 306 ha (760 acres)

Population (2011)
  - Total: 6,136
  - Density: 2,010/km^{2} (5,190/sq mi)

Languages
  - Official: Hindi, Urdu, Farsi
- Time zone: UTC+5:30 (IST)
- Vehicle registration: UP 61

Amir Chak is a village in Kamsaar in the Indian state of Uttar Pradesh.

== History ==
Kamsar-O-Bar is a region in Tehsil Zamania Dist Ghazipur (U.P.). There is one of the village named "AMIRCHAK". Village Amir Chak was inhabited in the end of seventeenth century by Diler Khan with the help of Janab Deendar Khan ( Dildarnagar is after him) . The pathans of Amir Chak are the descendants of Diler Khan, (Army Chief of Emperor Aurangzeb), came from Delhi. The ancestors of Diler Khan was Bahlol Lodi, Sikander Lodi and Ibrahim Lodi(last sultan of India). In past Amir Chak was the part of Mauza KUSI but in 2015 it became separate mauza. It comes in "BAR" sub region of "KAMSAR-O-BAR". Following villages come in KAMSAR sub region e.g. Usia, Rakasaha, Tajpur Kurrah, Gorasara, Mania, Khajuri, Kusi, Bhaksi, Jaburna, Dewaitha, Fufuao, Bahuara, Saraila, Chitarkoni, Akhini and following villages come in "BAR" sub region e.g. Dildarnagar, Mircha, Bara, Dildarnagar, Ramaval, Khiddipur-Mathare, Sikandarpur, Mahend, Pakhanpura, Machhti, Dumri, Beur etc. .The pathans of Amir Chak are converted from Hinduism. Pathans of Other village of Bar sub region are converted from Hindus ancestors.

Deendarnagar is mentioned in land records till 1839, due to some linguistic error, it got mentioned as Dildar Nagar which is till day.

The matter of fact is whole region of Kamsar O Bar consist of converted Muslims and the families of Amir Chak have good relationship with them.

== Historical population ==
Population Growth of Mircha
Year	Pop.	±%
1861	900	—
1871	990	+10.0%
1881	1,088	+9.9%
1891	1,200	+10.3%
1901	1,317	+9.7%
1911	1,448	+9.9%
1921	1,593	+10.0%
1931	1,790	+12.4%
1941	2,058	+15.0%
1951	2,070	+0.6%
1961	2,380	+15.0%
1971	2,737	+15.0%
1981	3,270	+19.5%
1991	4,250	+30.0%
2001	5,843	+37.5%
2011	6,136	+5.0%
2024	6,865	+11.9%
Source:Census of India
