= Jaburna =

Coordinates: 25°23′N 83°39′E

Jaburna Chandpur
- Village
- Farms of Jaburna during Winters
- Interactive map of Jaburna
- Country: India
- State: Uttar Pradesh
- District: Ghazipur
- Established: 1590; 436 years ago
- Founder: Zamindar Chand Khan

Government
  - Body: Gram panchayat

Area
  - Total: 320 ha (790 acres)
  - Land: 311.011 ha (768.52 acres)
  - Water: 8.989 ha (22.21 acres)

Population (2011)
  - Total: 3,894
  - Density: 1,252/km^{2} (3,243/sq mi)

Languages
  - Official: Hindi
- Time zone: UTC+5:30 (IST)

Jaburna is a village in Kamsaar in the Indian state of Uttar Pradesh.

== History ==
During the time of Mughal emperor Akbar there was a wealthy zamindar named Chand Khan who was a grandson of Narhar Khan, founder of Kamsar, who established Zaburna in 1580s. During the land distribution in year 1570, Narhar Khan gave twice the land to Bahbal Khan (his second son) than the rest of his sons. Bahbal Khan had five sons named as Khizir Khan, Mubarak Khan, Miya Khan, Naseer Khan and Chand Khan. Bahbal Khan distributed the property among his children then on that land Bahbal's eldest son named as Khizir Khan established Khizirabad, his second son named as Mubarak Khan established Mubarakabad and built a fort there. His fourth son established Naseerabad. Miya Khan (third son) received the Northern part of Kamsar and got a large amount of land near Tajpur Kurrah Miya's descendants established Sihani, Saraila, Chitrakoni, Gorasara, Seorai, and Baksara village on that land. The youngest son of Bahbal was Chand Khan who received the southern Kamsar and got 16,450 Bighas of land. He established Zaburna village (then known as Chandpur). He later distributed his property among his five sons name as Daud Khan, Heteem Khan, Tajat Khan, Kasim Khan, and Taj Khan in 1605.

Daud Khan established Dewaitha and built a fort, Hateem Khan and Tajat Khan settled at Zaburna only, Kasim Khan established Kasimpur and he also had land in bihar on which his descendants established Baraura and Taj Khan established Kesruva. Taj Khana did without issue so his property was given to Hateem Khan and Tajat Khan of Zaburna after his death. However, after, some years of land distribution Daud Khan bought more land near to Dewaitha and increased his property till Zamania. It is also said that one of Daud's granddaughters got married in Sihani and received a large part of land, on which land the family of Sihani shifted and established Fufuaon. During 1765 the descendants of Kasim Khan who lived at Kasimpur and Baraura shifted to Bihar bought land and established 12 villages including Mohammadganj and Haidernagar in present-day Palamu District of Jharkhand. It is said that there was a descendant of Kasim Khan from Kasimpur named Nawab Hidayat Ali Khan, who was nominated as the jagirdar of japla by Mughal emperor Muhammad Shah, in year 1740 on whose influence the family of Kasimpur shifted to Palamu in 1740 and bought land. They wanted to shift to Bengal subah. Nawab Hidyat Ali Khan's wife was Azmat-ul-Zohra Begum. Nawab Hidayat Ali Khan and Azamat-ul-Zohra Begum had one son named as Nawab Ghulam Hussain Khan who established Hussainabad (after his name) and fortified the place in 1768. The families in Zaburna still have good relationships with the family of Hidayt Ali Khan.

== Economy ==
Industry in Jaburna includes agriculture, brick manufacturing, fish farming and milling.

== Infrastructure ==
The village has two mosques and an Eidgah, and one temple. The village has one madarsa, two English private schools, and one government school. As of 2011 census the main population of the village lived in an area of 67.7 acres and had 418 households.

== Historical population ==
Zaburna was before a part of Daud pur Pargana. Then it was taken in Kusi in 1875. But till 1952 it was a part of Daudpur estate.

Population Growth of Dildarnagar Kamsar
Year	Pop.	±%
1861	2,200	—
1871	2,420	+10.0%
1881	2,665	+10.1%
1891	2,932	+10.0%
1901	3,283	+12.0%
1911	3,612	+10.0%
1921	3,970	+9.9%
1931	4,370	+10.1%
1941	4,894	+12.0%
1951	4,448	−9.1%
1961	3,177	−28.6%
1971	3,494	+10.0%
1981	3,560	+1.9%
1991	3,916	+10.0%
2001	3,900	−0.4%
2011	3,894	−0.2%
Source:Census of India
