= Dildarnagar Kamsar =

Dildarnagar Kamsar Kamsar-O-Bar
- Group of villages
- Kamsar
- Image of a Market Street in Dildarnagar, which is often referred as the capital or the main market hub of Kamsar.
- Interactive map of Dildarnagar Kamsar
- Country: India
- State: Uttar Pradesh
- District: Ghazipur
- Established: 1542; 484 years ago
- Founder: Raja Narhar Khan

Area
  - Total: 132.6659 km^{2} (51.2226 sq mi)

Population (2011)
  - Total: 160,433
  - Density: 1,209.30/km^{2} (3,132.08/sq mi)

Languages
  - Official: Hindi
- Time zone: UTC+5:30 (IST)
- Vehicle registration: UP61

Dildarnagar Kamsar (also known as Ahl-e-Kamsar or Kamsar-O-Bar) is a pargana (region) and a mashra comprising 34 settlements located around the Karamnasa River in the Ghazipur district of Uttar Pradesh and the Kaimur district of Bihar, India. Of these, 18 mouzas are the primary settlements. It is a prominent settlement of Khanzadas, also known as Kamsari Pathans, as well as Afghan Pathans, primarily of the Niazi and Yusufzai clans. The original name of the region was Kamsar, but due to close and historical ties with the family of Bara Pathans, the region is often referred to as Kamsar-O-Bar. Historically, this region was predominantly under the control of Bhumihar zamindars. Over time, a section of them embraced Islam and later came to be known as the Kamsari Pathans.

== History ==
Dildarnagar Kamsar, also known as Kamsar-O-Bar, is a fertile region located on the banks of the Ganges and Karamnasa rivers. Its original name, Kamsar, is derived from Kamesaradih, the area where its founder, Raja Narhar Khan, lived in a small fort. The name was later expanded to Kamsar-O-Bar. The history of the region dates back to the time of the Mughal emperor Babur in 1530, when two rulers, Raja Kam Dev and Raja Dham Dev who were of Bhumihar Bramhin origin brought their armies to settle here. Kam Dev was the ruler of Pahargah estate which consisted, present-day Gwalior, Morena, Shivpuri, and Jhansi, and later became the ruler of Fatehabad in Fatehpur, during Babur's reign. They came to the region after their defeat in the Battle of Khanwa and then the Battle of Madarpur against Babur. Initially, the family settled at Sakardih near, Gahmar, and later, Kam Dev's family shifted to a place called Dalpatpur, which is now known as Reotipur. From there, the family spread across Zamania and the surrounding areas, establishing more than a hundred villages in the Ghazipur, Buxar, Kochas, and present-day Kaimur districts. Meanwhile, Dham Dev's family established Gahmar, Chausa, Bhabua, Chainpur, Kudra and 84 other villages in the vicinity of Gahmar.

Ancestry of Kam Dev's descendants and Kamsar Pathans, from Sankrit Bhumihar Gotra, as different gotras have different ancestry of Kam Dev.

=== After the early settlement ===
In Kam Dev's or Rao Dalpat's family, one of his fourth-generation grandsons, named Raja Narhar Dev Rao, was converted to Islam and became a Muslim in 1542 keeping his name Raja Narhar Khan. He was the eldest and most responsible member of his family and was entrusted with the management of the jagir and Sarkar of the region, which elevated him to the status of a nobleman. His father, Puranmal Rao Sakarwar, had seven sons, of whom Narhar was the eldest. However, after Narhar's mother's death, Puranmal married two other women after coming to Ghazipur and had six more sons. As a result, Narhar was neglected from his childhood, and due to disputes, he did not get along with his stepmothers.

The legend says that Narhar and his wife were childless. One day, while his wife was sitting sadly on the veranda of her house, she saw a Sufi saint named Makhdoom Syed Shah Junaid Qadri. The saint asked for rotis (flatbreads) and inquired about her problem. After hearing about their childlessness, she gave him five rotis, and he blessed them with the gift of five children. His prayer and blessing worked, and they later had five sons in the 1540s, named Jahangir Khan, Barbal Khan, Baran Khan, Usman Khan, and Khan Jahan Khan. They witnessed many other miracles performed by the Sufi saint, which inspired them to explore Islam.

Narhar recited the "Kalma" at Sher Shah Suri's court, where he had gone to pay the lagan (revenue) of his realm. He adopted Islam and was given the title of Khan-e-Alam for his bravery in 1542, and he became Raja Narhar Khan. This decision, however, was not well received by his father and brothers. Due to a dispute between Narhar and his younger brothers, his father, Puranmal, gave Narhar a share of land near Kamesaradih and effectively disowned him. Along with this, a fact that 300 yrs back a beef piece was thrown in a well in Bhumihar dominated Ghazipur dist's Bara taluka. Those who drunk water 4m the well were expelled from the Bhumihar community. They later became Kamsar pathans. (Got pathan status in islam bcs of being high in social hierarchy)

Later, Raja Narhar Khan established a new jagir and regained control over his ancestral areas. He build his fort at Kamesaradih, from which the place and the Kamsar Pathans and Kamsar derived their name. He also retained his title of Raja. Raja Narhar Khan was greatly influenced by Islam and the Sufis, and his elder son, Jahangir Khan, also became a revered Sufi saint. His dargah (tomb) is located at Akhini village in Kamsar. Narhar's descendants went on to establish many villages along the banks of the Karamnasa and Ganga rivers. One of his descendants, Qasim Khan, founded Karmahari, but his descendants later migrated to the Daltonganj and Palamu regions, founding 11 villages there. They are known as Kamisara Pathans, a subgroup of the Kamsar Pathans. The second son of Puranmal from his second wife, Ratan Deo Rao, founded Basuka, while his other five sons established Reotipur, Sherpur, Semra, and many other nearby villages.

=== Zamindari Estate (1540s-late 1600s) ===
The Kamsaar Jagir was established in the early 16th century, initially consisting of the mauzas of Reotipur, Sherpur,(Qariat Reotipur)and Bara, along with other villages in the region that now form Dildarnagar Kamsar and nearby. The jagir’s origins trace back to Puranmal, a descendant of Kam Dev, who was a prominent figure in the area. His son, Raja Narhar Khan, succeeded him as the chief of the region. Despite converting to Islam, Raja Narhar Khan served as the leader of the Kamsaar Jagir under the Sur Empire and continued to hold power after the Mughal Empire's rise. The Kamsar realm was significant because its location near Sasaram, then the capital of Sur empire. His leadership marked a period of consolidation, and the jagir became an important center of administration, although the Kamsar jagir in Ain-i-Akbari was still, marked as a Bhumihar possession as majority of the people were Sakarwar Rajputs ( Bhumihars who married to Rajput women became Sakarwar Rajputs) and Bhumihars who belonged to the family of Kam Dev.

The estate as per Ain-i-Akbari had a cultivation area of 66,548 bighas with a revenue demand of 2,760,000 dams, providing 50 horse and 5,000 foot soldiers. Ali Quli Khan Zaman of Zamania, got the Subah of Jaunpur and Ghazipur Sarkar, he made Asad Ullah Khan his deputy at Zamania, while Kamsaar being an important zamindari, although because of Zaman's rebellions against Akbar he was killed in 1567, and then the Sarkar was given to Munim Khan. Raja Narhar Khan's descendants expanded the jagir, with his great-grandson Quttul Khan establishing the Taluka of Seorai, which encompassed 52 villages. He was a Dewan of the Subah, He constructed a fort and an Eidgah, making Seorai a central hub during Akbar. Following his death in a dispute with Man Singh Rai of Reotipur, his cousin Raja Daud Khan avenged him and assumed control of Dewaitha (then Daudpur) and the Kamsar region succeeding Quttul. Daud Khan strengthened the estate's political influence, and at its height, Kamsar-O-Bar extended across half of Zamania tehsil and parts of Ramgarh and Nuaon tehsils. Prominent villages like Mircha and Dildarnagar, also emerged. The family had strong ties with Hetam Khan of Hetampur, the jagirdar of Chandauli, leading to the settlement of Hetam's descendants in Mania. During later years all the parganas, of jagir seem to have good relationships.

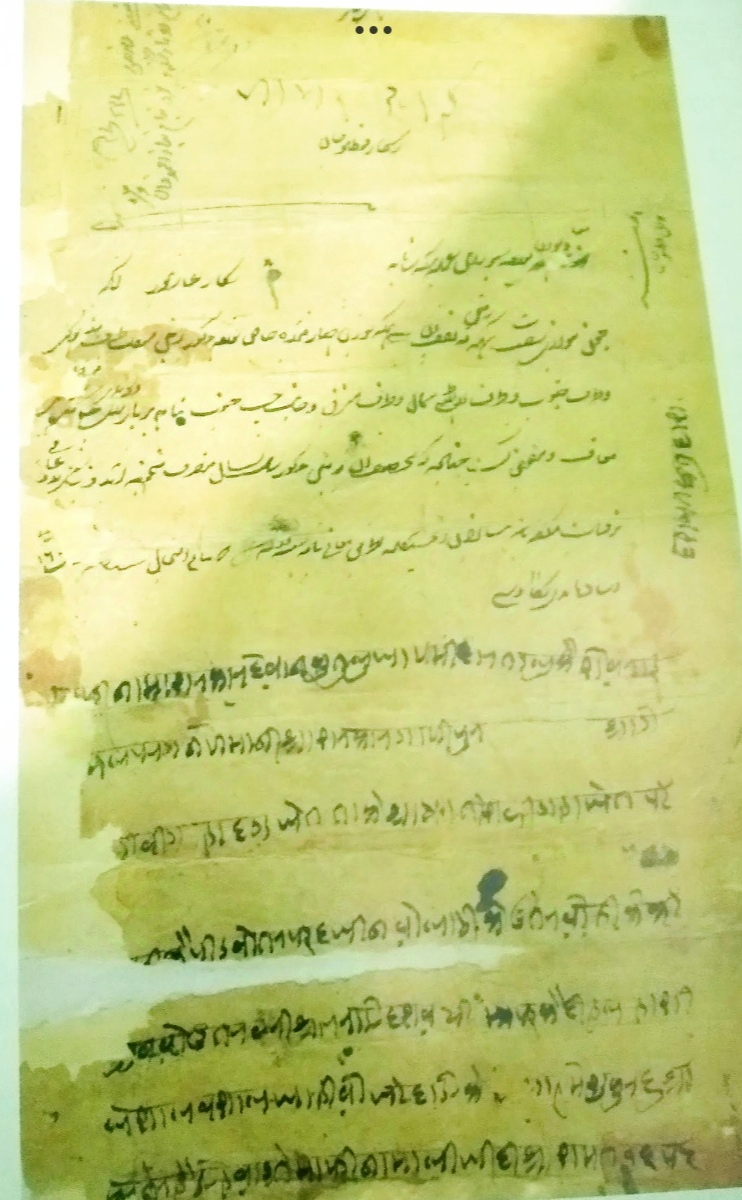
A letter in farsi, of Mughal era, written by Raja Quttul Khan to Man Singh Rai of Reotipur, in 1601 AD, some days before his murder

By the late 17th century, however, the centralized authority of the Kamsaar Jagir began to decline. The jagir fragmented into smaller estates, each governed by individual villages, including those in Dildarnagar Kamsar. Kamsaries became, notable people of the region establishing small Zamindari estates during Mughals such as Dewaitha (Daudpur) or Khizirpur (Umarganj). During later rules of Shahjahan & then Aurangzeb, Sufi bahadur & later Anik-ullah Khan was the incharge of Ghazipur Sarkar, while many positions being held by Deendar khan of Diladarnagar. The area of also gained more importance during, the time Nawabs of Ghazipur, Nawab Sheikh Abdullah & then Fazl Ali Khan. There were also some small battles fought in this region (at Seorai, Dildarnagar) during the time of foreign invasions in the area or any big robbery.

=== British era ===
During British Raj, the area lost much of its importance, as the estate was already fragmented. Some of the important zamindaries during British Raj of the old estate were Qariat Reotipur (Sherpur & Reotipur pargana), Dewaitha (Daudpur), Khizirpur (Umarganj), & Usia. Bara, Gahmar and Nawali being large villages.Although during British, the liability of the revenue payment was through, British representatives, such as a part belonged to, Deokinandan of Anapur in Allahabad. Kamsaries during British Raj seemed to be annoyed, by the rule, they also took part in the rebellion of 1857, started by Kunwar Singh, ruler of Jagdishpur estate, which consisted chiefs and many zamindars of Kamsaar region. Whereas Sakarwars Rajputs of Gahmar & Reotipur were led by Meghar Singh.

== Social Reforms in Dildarnagar Kamsar ==
Khan Bahadur Mansur Ali Khan (1873–1934)

Dildarnagar Kamsar has been historically shaped by the contributions of notable leaders like Khan Bahadur Mansur Ali Khan of Gorasara, Deputy Muhammad Syed Khan and Haroon Rashid of Usia, and Maulvi Suleman Khan of Dewaitha. Khan Bahadur Mansur Ali Khan championed the anti-dowry movement through the "Anjuman Islah Kamsar-o-Bar" in 1910, promoting simplicity in weddings and other cultural practises.

Deputy Muhammad Sayed Khan (1894–1966)

Deputy Muhammad Sayed Khan, a distinguished administrator and educator, established the Syed Kamsar-O-Bar Muslim Degree College at Dildarnagar in 1936, Known for his integrity, he also upheld justice as a Deputy Collector and supported Mahatma Gandhi during the freedom struggle. Their efforts in education, social reforms, and community development laid the foundation for progress in Dildarnagar Kamsar. Haroon Rashid' of Usia was famous for his Urdu inquilab.

== Towns and villages ==
It consists of these places.

- Akhini
- Arangi
- Bahuwara
- Baksara
- Bhaksi
- Chitarkoni
- Dewaitha
- Dildarnagar
- Faridpur
- Fufuao
- Gorasara
- Jaburna
- Kadirpur
- Karmahari
- Kharaicha
- Kamesaradih
- Khajuri
- Khizirpur
- Kurrah
- Kusi
- Mahana
- Mania
- Mircha
- Muhammadpur
- Palia
- Rakasaha
- Rasulpur
- Saraila
- Sendura
- Seorai
- Sihani
- Usia

=== Other places with significant Kamsari pathan populations ===
Mahend, Karimuddinpur, Bara, Bahadurganj, Ikhlaspur.

== Notable people ==
- Nazir Hussain, Indian film actor
- Badruddin Khan, cricketer known as iqbal Badruddin khan
- Mohan Rathore, Singer

== See also ==
- Reotipur
- Sherpur
- Zamania
