= Dewaitha =

Dewaitha Daudpur
- Village
- Location in Uttar Pradesh, India
- Coordinates: 25.364°N 83.644°E
- Country: India
- State: Uttar Pradesh
- District: Ghazipur
- Established: 1605; 421 years ago
- Founder: Raja Daud Khan

Government
  - Type: Panchayati Raj (India)
  - Body: Gram Pradhan

Area
  - Total: 525.84 ha (1,299.4 acres)
- Elevation: 70 m (230 ft)

Population (2011)
  - Total: 7,104
  - Density: 1,351/km^{2} (3,499/sq mi)
- Demonym: Kamsari

Languages
  - Official: Bhojpuri, Hindi
- Time zone: UTC+5:30 (IST)
- PIN: 232326
- Telephone code: 05497
- Vehicle registration: UP 61

Dewaitha (also written as Diwaitha, Divaitha or Deoitha) is a village of Dildarnagar Kamsar, in Zamania tehsil of Ghazipur, India, located on the banks of the Karmanasa River and it's tributary Eknaiya, The village had a population of 7,104 as of the 2011 Census of India. The place is inhabited by Kamsar Pathans. .

== History ==
Dewaitha, formerly known as Daudpur is a historic village established by Dewan Sarkar Raja Daud Khan Zamindar a great-grandson of Narhar Khan the founder of Kamsar region. Narhar's third son, Bahbal Khan had five sons who founded several villages in the Kamsar region. His youngest son Chand Khan receiving his share of estate, established Jaburna. He later distributed his estate among his five sons name as Daud Khan, Hateem Khan, Tajat Khan, Qasim Khan, and Taj Khan .His sons, Hateem & Tajat Khan settled at Jaburna, Qasim Khan founded, nearby Karmahari and Baraura, although his descendants moved to Daltonganj and founder 11 villages there, abandoning the place, they are known as Kamisara Pathans. Taj Khan founded the hamlet, Kesruva. Taj Khan was without issue so his estate was transferred to his brothers. Daud Khan founded Dewaitha in 1605 AD.

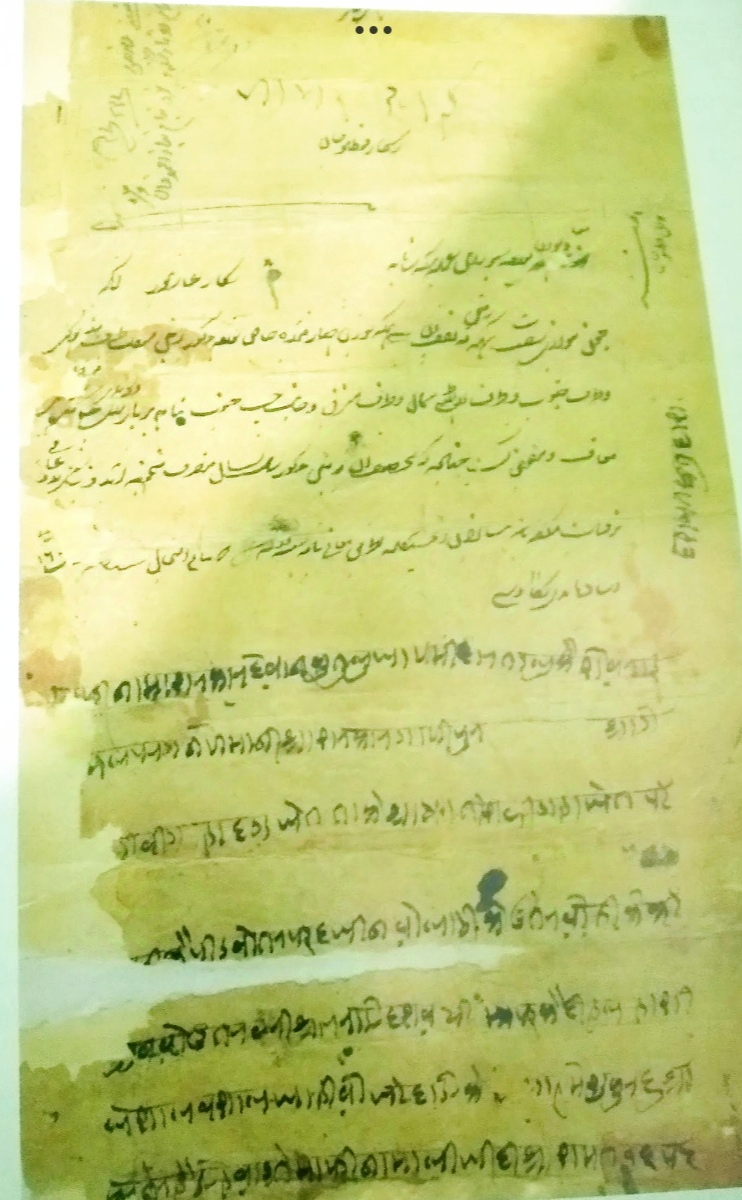
A letter of Mughal era, written by Raja Kuttul Khan in farsi, to Man singh Rai of Reotipur, in 1601 AD, some months before his murder.

Daud Khan's cousin, Raja Sarkar Dewan Quttul Khan, Zamindar of Taluka Seorai, re-established the jagir of his great-grandfather, Raja Narhar Khan, known as Kamsar Jagir, comprising 52 villages, and built a fort at Seorai during Akbar's reign. He was later killed in a conflict with Man Singh Rai of Reotipur. Daud Khan avenged his cousin's death and succeeded him as Dewan of the Subah under Jahangir, consolidating his position as jagirdar of the pargana. He expanded his ancestral lands, forming the Daudpur Zamindari estate from Dewaitha to Zamania, with its administrative center fort (Kot) at Dewaitha. In the early 1600s, he built a mosque, Eidgah, and an orchard with thousands of trees, naming the nearby mouza Daudpur. His eldest son, Mahmud Khan, founded Rasulpur, while his second son, Kabir Khan, gave his name to Kabirpur (Rohura), though most of Kabir's descendants later migrated to Akhlashpur due to family ties. Only part of Daud Khan's kot remains today in Kot Muhalla. The estate flourished under successive generations, notably Raja Yad Ali Khan a sixth-generation descendant, who solidified its prominence. He received a title of Nawab and rais, by the British, which continued in his family. Yad Ali's elder brother, Qadir Khan, is remembered through the nearby hamlet of Qadirpur. During his time estate boundaries touched the borders of zamindari of Amil Chaudhary Azmal of Zamania, he died in 1837AD giving the estate to his eldest grandson Khuda Bhaksh. During the 1857 rebellion, led by Kunwar singh, Raja Khuda Bhaksh Khan, taluqdar of estate, also led the Kamsaries in the uprising, with his brothers, one of whom, Akbar Khan attaining martyrdom. During the rebellion there was outrage between the zamindars of the region regarding forced cultivation of Opium. After Khuda Bhaksh, his younger brother Amir Khan succeeded him. Dewaitha being a junction of two places, Zamania and Dildarnagar, got name Dewaitha, derived from "Dwi (द्वि): Means "two" or "dual."Aitha: related to something like "coming" or "arrival."Together, "Diwaitha" could meant "a place of two arrivals" or "a junction of two paths and so, the name was registered as Diwaitha.

1990 view showing Dewaitha Jama masjid build by Daud Khan, although it has renovated many times, latest rebuild took during the time of Khuda Bhaksh.

Under British rule, some parts of the Kamsar region fell under the jurisdiction of Amil Deokinandan (Kusi &Usia) and 37 villages taluka to Gaighat, under, Vizianagaram Estate. The Daudpur estate, became small consisting 18 mouzas nearby Dewaitha, but remained under the chieftaincy control of the family with co-operation, till zamindari abolishment in 1956. Muhammad Wasil Khan, the estate's last chief and taluqdar, became the first pradhan of Dewaitha. He established the village's first primary school and a private medical centre which was operated by a trust of Yad's descendants, Yad Ali's family is known as Athoghar. "In 1940, 502 gold coins were excavated from the village of whom 96 were of Gupta dynasty. The village also celebrates the Urs of a Sufi saint, named Sabir Shah, every year, in the old kot where he lived, Sabir Shah was from Beenapara, though he and his brother lived at Dewaitha, his mazar is at Biur, near Chainpur, while his brother is buried at the Eidgah here.

An image of the old primary school, at Dewaitha, constructed in the 1930s, although in 1974 it was renamed after Sufi saint Sabir Shah.

== Demographics ==
Devaitha, a prominent village in Zamania Tehsil, Ghazipur district, Uttar Pradesh, has a population of 7,104 across 917 families (2011 Census). Males number 3,685 and females 3,419, with a sex ratio of 928 females per 1,000 males, higher than the state average of 912. The child population (0–6 years) is 1,131 (15.92% of the total), with a child sex ratio of 988, exceeding the state average of 902. The village has a literacy rate of 76.04%, above the state average of 67.68%, with male literacy at 87.20% and female literacy at 63.88%. Governed by an elected Pradhan, Devaitha includes several mohallas like Kot Muhallah, Haji Muhallah, Athoghar, Vichli patti, Purab, Pachim, Uttar, and Dakhin. The Scheduled Caste population is 1,203, with 25 from Scheduled Tribes

In Devaitha, 1,381 residents are involved in various work activities. Among them, 43.74% are engaged in primary employment (work lasting more than six months in a year), while 56.26% participate in marginal work, providing livelihood for less than six months annually. Of those engaged in primary employment, 130 are cultivators (either owners or co-owners of land), and 30 work as agricultural laborers.

== Geography ==
Dewaitha is located in Zamania Tehsil, Ghazipur district, Uttar Pradesh, about 30 kilometers from Ghazipur, 12 kilometers from Zamania and 8.5 km from the nearby market town of Dildarnagar. The village lies in the fertile Gangetic plains near the Karmanasa River, with a natural water channel or stream called Eknaiya, connecting the Karmanasa to the Ganges.

A view of Karmanasa River.

The village's climate is typical of the Gangetic plains, featuring hot summers, monsoon rains, and cool winters. The fertile soil supports the cultivation of crops such as wheat, rice, and sugarcane, with this the village is located in mango belt, the fruits which are native like Blackberry, lychee, Guava, Coconuts, and Mangoes including famous native varieties like Chaunsa and langra, making agriculture a livelihood.

== See also ==
- Dildarnagar Kamsar
- Karmahari
- Jaburna
- Fufuao
