= Zamania Canal =

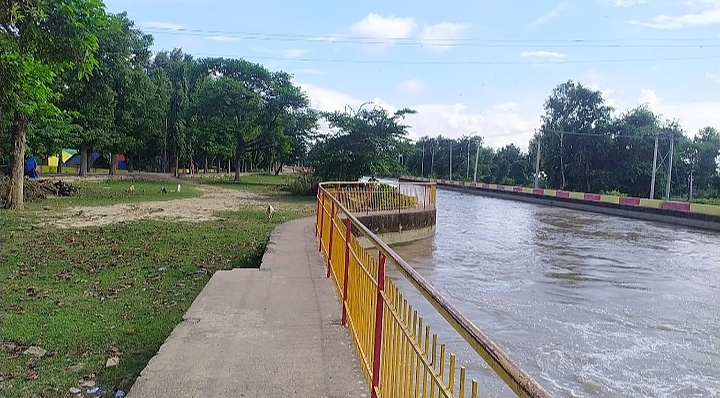

- Location within Uttar Pradesh
- Country: India
- Coordinates: 25.3884423°N 83.5361230°E

Specifications
- Length: 40.5 km (25.2 miles)
- Maximum height AMSL: 73 m (240 ft)

History
- Former names: Chaudhari Caharan Singh Zamania Canal
- Construction began: 1912
- Date completed: 1918
- Date restored: 1980

Geography
- Start point: Chakkah Barrage

Zamania Canal (also known as Chaudhari Caharan Singh Zamania Canal) is one of the largest canals located in Ghazipur District. The idea for the canal was given in 1910 and the plan was passed in 1911, but the canal was established in year 1912 for the better irrigation of Zamania tehsil. It starts from Chakkah Bandh and ends on the banks of Karmanasa River near Bara Village of Seorai Teshsil. It irrigates about 61,863 acres of land in Zamania tehsil. Its average width is 110 ft.

It was built as Zamania Canal but was renamed in 1984, after the death of Chaudhari Charan Singh. It passes through the towns of Zamania, Dildarnagar, Seorai and the Parganas of Kamsar, Seorai, Reotipur and Zamania.

Zamania Canal also has other canals such as Phooli Canal (length 17.5 km) built in 1932, Dewaitha distributary (length 15 km) which was built in 1922, and Paras Dih Minor (length 59 km) which is now in Chandauli District. Paras Dih Minor ends in Latif Shah Dam. Paras Dih Minor was constructed in 1922.

== See also ==
- Deokali Canal,
