= Arangi =

Arangi may refer to:

- Arangi, Ghazipur - a village in Ghazipur district, Uttar Pradesh, India.
- Arangi, Chandauli - a village in Chandauli district, Uttar Pradesh, India.
