= Faridpur, Usia =

Faridpur Usia Khurd Fareedpur Faridabad
- village
- Location in Uttar Pradesh, India
- Coordinates: 25.4472598°N 83.7186514°E
- Country: India
- State: Uttar Pradesh
- District: Ghazipur
- Established: 1720; 306 years ago
- Founder: Zamindari Farid Khan

Government
  - Body: Gram panchayat

Area
  - Total: 32.2 ha (80 acres)

Population (2011)
  - Total: 873
  - Density: 2,710/km^{2} (7,020/sq mi)

Languages
  - Official: Hindi
- Time zone: UTC+5:30 (IST)
- Vehicle registration: UP

Faridpur is a hamlet, in Dildarnagar Kamsar located in Ghazipur District of Uttar Pradesh, India. Faridpur was part of Usia village but was later separated from Usia and was made a new village in 2016, when Seorai tehsil was made. Almost 200 Kamsaar Pathans Live in the villages as of 2011.
