= Saidabad, Ghazipur =

Saidabad
- Village
- Country: India
- State: Uttar Pradesh
- District: Ghazipur
- Established: 1710; 316 years ago
- Founder: Zamindar Said Khan

Government
  - Type: Panchayati Raj (India)
  - Body: Gram Pradhan

Area
  - Total: 102.77 ha (254.0 acres)
- Elevation: 70 m (230 ft)

Population (2011)
  - Total: 1,622
  - Density: 1,578/km^{2} (4,088/sq mi)
- Demonym: Saidabadi

Languages
  - Official: Bhojpuri, Hindi, Urdu
- Time zone: UTC+5:30 (IST)
- Telephone code: 05497
- Vehicle registration: UP 61

Saidabad is in Zamania tehsil of Ghazipur District, Uttar Pradesh, India. It has a population of 1622 and a geographical area of 102.77 hectares. As of 2011 the Literacy rate of Saidabad is 83%, where 93% is for men and 73% for women.
