= Dumri, Dildarnagar =

Dumri
- village
- Interactive map of Dumri
- Country: India
- State: Uttar Pradesh
- District: Ghazipur
- Established: 1660s

Government
  - Body: Gram panchayat

Area
  - Total: 260 ha (640 acres)

Population (2011)
  - Total: 4,158
  - Density: 1,600/km^{2} (4,100/sq mi)

Languages
  - Official: Hindi
- Time zone: UTC+5:30 (IST)
- Vehicle registration: UP
- Website: up.gov.in

Dumri is a village in Dildarnagar kamsar located in Durgawati tehsil of the Indian state of Bihar. Dumri is large village and have svetalaana small villages or hamlets which are relative villages of Dumri which makes it the largest Gram Panchayat of Durgawati tehsil.

As of 2011 Census the main Population of Dumri village was 4158 and the geographical area of the village was 260 hectares. Dumri's Gram Panchayaat had a total Population of 18457 as of 2011 census report and had a total geographical area of 1976 hectares. The Dumri was before a part of Daudpur parhana of Kamsar-o-Bar jagir During Mughal and early British Raj. Many Kamsar pathans from Dewaitha, and nearby villages settled in a region in 1600s and established Dumri Later some families also migrated to nearby villages and name as Mansurpur, Nuaon, Kabilaspur, Firozpur, etc. Which know come in Dumri Gram Panchayat. Many family's also migrated to a village near Dumri name as Karari. All the villages which come in Dumri Gram Panchaat are the part of Dildarnagar Kamsar.
