= Muhammadpur T Chaudhari Azmal =

Muhammadpur T Chaudhari Azmal sultanpur
- Village
- Location in Uttar Pradesh, India
- Coordinates: 25.407475°N 83.5679999°E
- Country: India
- State: Uttar Pradesh
- District: Ghazipur
- Established: 1740; 286 years ago
- Founder: Chaudhari Muhammad Azmal

Government
  - Type: Panchayat
  - Body: Gram Pradhan (Aarti yadav)

Area
  - Total: 573 ha (1,420 acres)
- Elevation: 70 m (230 ft)

Population (2011)
  - Total: 4,194
  - Density: 732/km^{2} (1,900/sq mi)

Languages
  - Official: Bhojpuri
- Time zone: UTC+5:30 (IST)
- PIN: 232326
- Telephone code: 05497
- Vehicle registration: up-61
- Sex ratio: male 51.90% female 42.10% ♂/♀

Muhammadpur T Chaudhari Azmal is a village of Kamsaar in Zamania Block of Ghazipur District of Uttar Pradesh, India. It is 24 km south from District headquarters Ghazipur. 6 km from Zamania. 363 km from the state capital Lucknow. As of 2011 census the main population of the village lived in an area of 70 acres and had 576 households.

== Historical population ==
Population Growth of Muhammadpur
Year	Pop.	±%
1861	420	—
1871	460	+9.5%
1881	510	+10.9%
1891	558	+9.4%
1901	614	+10.0%
1911	675	+9.9%
1921	742	+9.9%
1931	816	+10.0%
1941	900	+10.3%
1951	980	+8.9%
1961	2,058	+110.0%
1971	3,700	+79.8%
1981	3,920	+5.9%
1991	4,116	+5.0%
2001	4,000	−2.8%
2011	4,194	+4.8%
Source:Census of India
