= Gorasara =

Gorasara chota Kashmir
- village

- Location in Uttar Pradesh, India Gorasara (India)
- Coordinates: 25.43°N 83.74°E
- Country: India
- State: Uttar Pradesh
- Division: Varanasi
- District: Ghazipur
- Established: 1655; 371 years ago
- Founder: Raja Zamindar Bhikham Khan Alias Raja Feqan Khan

Government
  - Body: Gram panchayat

Area
  - Total: 397.96 ha (983.4 acres)
  - Land: 380.227 ha (939.56 acres)
  - Water: 17.733 ha (43.82 acres)

Population (2011)
  - Total: 4,684
  - Density: 1,232/km^{2} (3,191/sq mi)
- Demonym: Kamsari

Language
  - Official: Hindi
  - Additional official: Urdu
- Time zone: UTC+5:30 (IST)
- PIN: 232333
- Telephone code: +91-0548
- Vehicle registration: up-61
- Nearest city: Dildarnagar
- Sex ratio: 1000/937 ♂/♀
- Lok Sabha constituency: Ghazipur
- Vidhan Sabha constituency: Zamania
- Website: up.gov.in

Gorasara is a village located in Dildarnagar Kamsar, Uttar Pradesh, India. Gorasara village was established by Zamindar Bhikham Khan Urf Feqan khan in 1650 AD, who was the grandson of Sarkar Diwan Kutlu Khan Zamindar Jagirdar Taluka Sewarai. Kutlu Khan was a great-grandson of Narhar Khan, founder of Dildarnagar Kamsar.

According to some old records and sources in the village, Mughal minister came to this place during the rule of the Mughal emperor Shahjahan rule and witnessed that all the people living in the village had white skin, which led to its name Goresara, A village of white people, later during the British rule due to wrong pronunciation the name was changed to Gorasara.

As of the 2011 Census of India, the main population of the village lived in an area of 87.5 acres of land with 637 households.

== History ==
Gorasara is a village located in Dildarnagar Kamsar, Uttar Pradesh, India. Gorasara village was established by Bhikham Khan, son of Fateh Bahadur Khan, and great-great-grandson of Narhar Khan.

The place was of Kamsaar estate, actually Kamsar jagir already existed during the time of Narhar Khan founder of Kamsar and revenue was paid to Sur empire. But later during Mughals it was reestablished by Raja Quttul Khan a jagirdar of the pargana and Sarkar, and the divan of the subah, he build a fort here in early 1600s and dug a canal around it for security, during the time of later years of Akbar's rule. Still some parts of the canal can be seen around the village

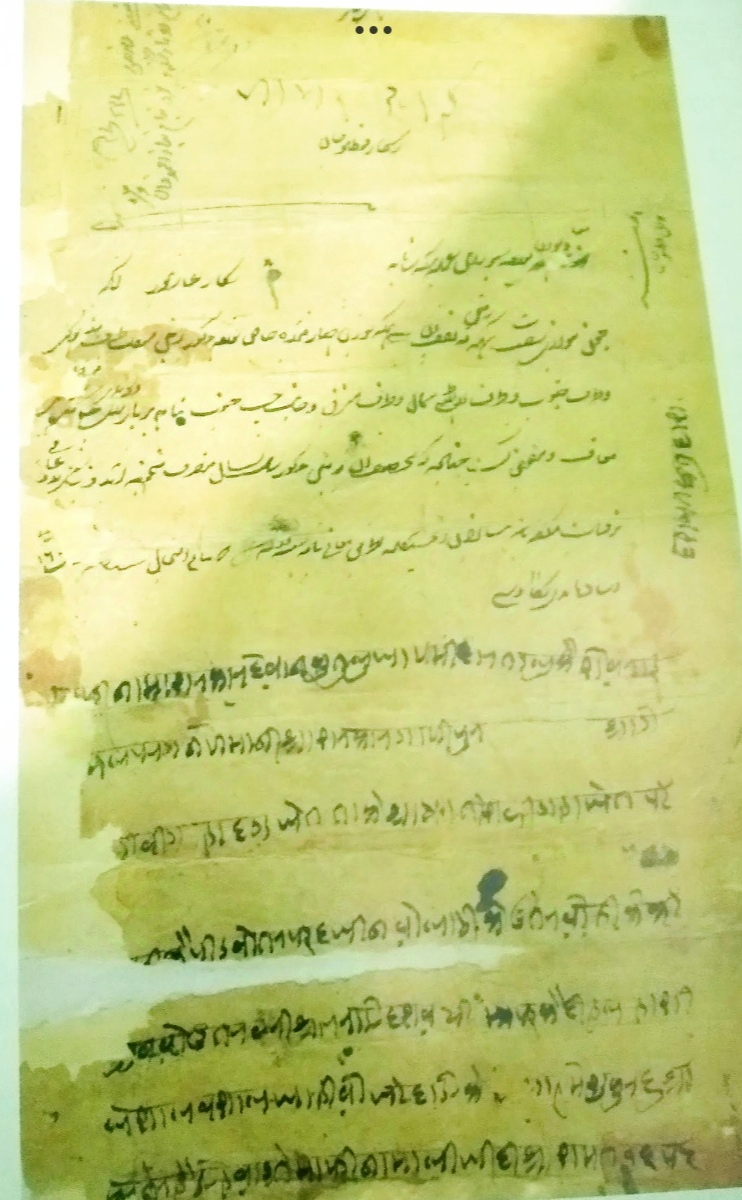
The letter in farsi, of Mughal era, written by Raja Kuttul Khan to Man singh Rai of Reotipur, in 1601 AD, somedays before his murder.

During his time, Kamsaar jagir's main administrative centre was Seorai and Kuttul Khan was its governor. Kamsaar jagir was spread over 52 nearby villages granted by Akbar. He also build a fort and a Mosque, and Eidgah in the village of Seorai. Although he was killed in a dispute by Man Singh Rai of Reotipur, then his cousin Daud Khan of Dewaitha, took revenge of his death and succeeded him. During the 1860s a large number of people belonging to Kushwaha families settled in the village. The name Seorai was kept because there was also a large population of Sevri families who had settled here during the time of Babur. After the death of Quttul Khan one of his grand sons name as Zamindar Fulan Khan settled here with his family in year 1630. While seorai was established as a taluka of Kamsaar, Reotipur, Sherpur region. Which were large villages, among the 52 villages taluka. The Sakarwars of Seorai, settled here from the family of Shubhsen Rao, who was a great-grandson of Raja Dham Dev Rao of Gahmar. Where as the Kamsaries were from Fulan Khan a grandson of Quttul Khan. Fulan Khan's family lived here for many years. But, the population of Zamindar Fulan Khan family decreased and most of them migrated to Gorasara & Mania

Gorasara, located in the Zamania pargana of Ghazipur, witnessed a tragic historical event during the reign of Mughal Emperor Shah Alam I. On 16th Muharram (Tuesday, 1710-11 CE), Kunwar Dheer Singh (Muhammad Bahrmand Khan), the faujdar of Chainpur and the son of zamindar Muhammad Deendar Khan of Dildarnagar, was martyred while defending the region against a rebellious former faujdar of Chausa. The attack was orchestrated due to animosity from Moatsim Khan, the faujdar of Ghazipur.

The rebels looted villages like Seorai, Bareji, Gorasara, and Maniya, destroying property and desecrating Seorai's old mosque. Bahrmand Khan and his companions, including Sheikh Dayanatullah, Muhammad Hamza, and Muhammad Sultan, sacrificed their lives to protect the region.

The event deeply grieved Muhammad Dindar Khan, who documented the incident in a Persian "Mahzarnama" addressed to the emperor. Today, the Deendar Shamsi Museum and Library preserves this document, along with the legacy of Bahrmand Khan's bravery, as reflected in the five graves at Seorai's Kuttul Khan Mosque.

== Agriculture ==
The soil of the village is rich in minerals. The water level of the village is less than 100 feet deep. The village land extends to the banks of Karmansa River. As of the 2011 census, the area of the village is 983.38 acres. ponds cover 18 acres, with the rest of the land dedicated to other crop production. Many types of crops that grow in the nearby Ghazipur and Buxar districts are grown in the village.

Gorasara has been known for its sunflower farming for more than 300 years. During the summer, sunflowers are planted on a large scale in the village, usually on more than 500 acres of land. Flowers are sent to other cities, states and countries. Sunflowers were used to make sunflower oil in the village during the Mughal and British eras. Rose farming is also done on a large scale. The village is known for its rose plantation done every year to make rose water. Every year different breeds of sunflower and rose are planted on a large scale in the village.

== Plantation ==
When Goarasar village was established by Bhikham Khan (a descendant of Narhar Khan of Kamsar), his son Fateh Bahadur Khan build a large orchard in the village which was named Hazara Bagh. The orchard built by Fateh took over an area of hundreds of bigha and thousands of trees. Now the orchard is owned by his descendants who are Kamsar Pathans.

== Historical population ==
Population Growth of Dildarnagar Kamsar
Year	Pop.	±%
1861	1,205	—
1871	1,446	+20.0%
1881	1,807	+25.0%
1891	2,170	+20.1%
1901	2,495	+15.0%
1911	2,994	+20.0%
1921	3,743	+25.0%
1931	4,117	+10.0%
1941	4,325	+5.1%
1951	4,303	−0.5%
1961	4,098	−4.8%
1971	3,884	−5.2%
1981	4,200	+8.1%
1991	4,372	+4.1%
2001	4,500	+2.9%
2011	4,684	+4.1%
Source:Census of India

== Notable people ==
Khan Bahadur Mansur Ali Khan (1873–1934)

Dildarnagar Kamsar has been historically shaped by the contributions of notable leaders like Khan Bahadur Mansur Ali Khan of Gorasara, Deputy Muhammad Syed Khan and Haroon Rashid of Usia, and Maulvi Suleman Khan of Dewaitha. Khan Bahadur Mansur Ali Khan championed the anti-dowry movement through the "Anjuman Islah Kamsar-o-Bar" in 1910, promoting simplicity in weddings and other cultural practises.

- Badruddin Khan, cricketer known as iqbal Badruddin khan

== Gallery ==
Farms in Gorasara

Image of a sunflower farm in Gorasara

Image of a rose farm in Gorasara.

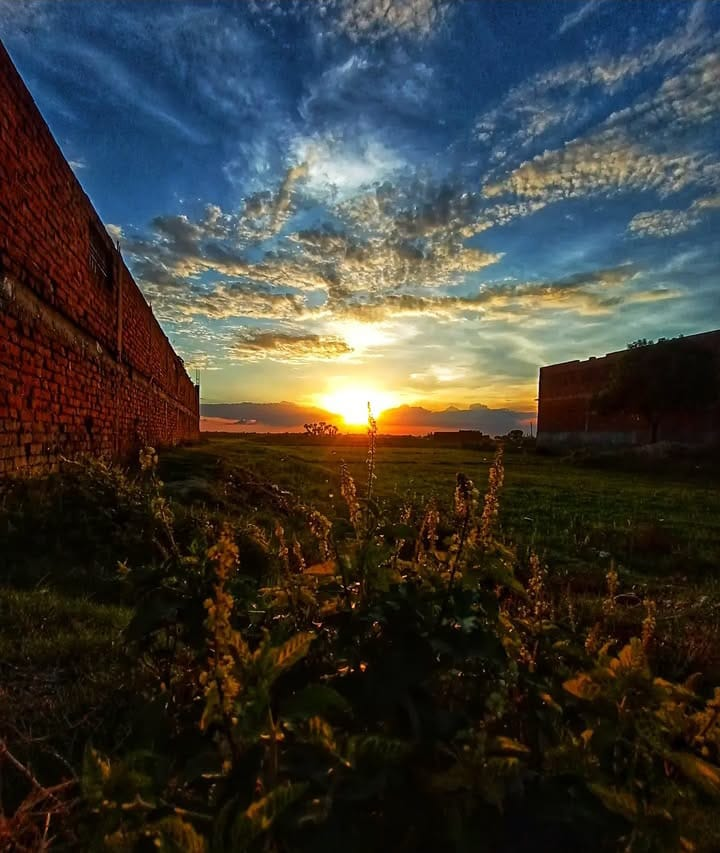
West farms of Gorasara.

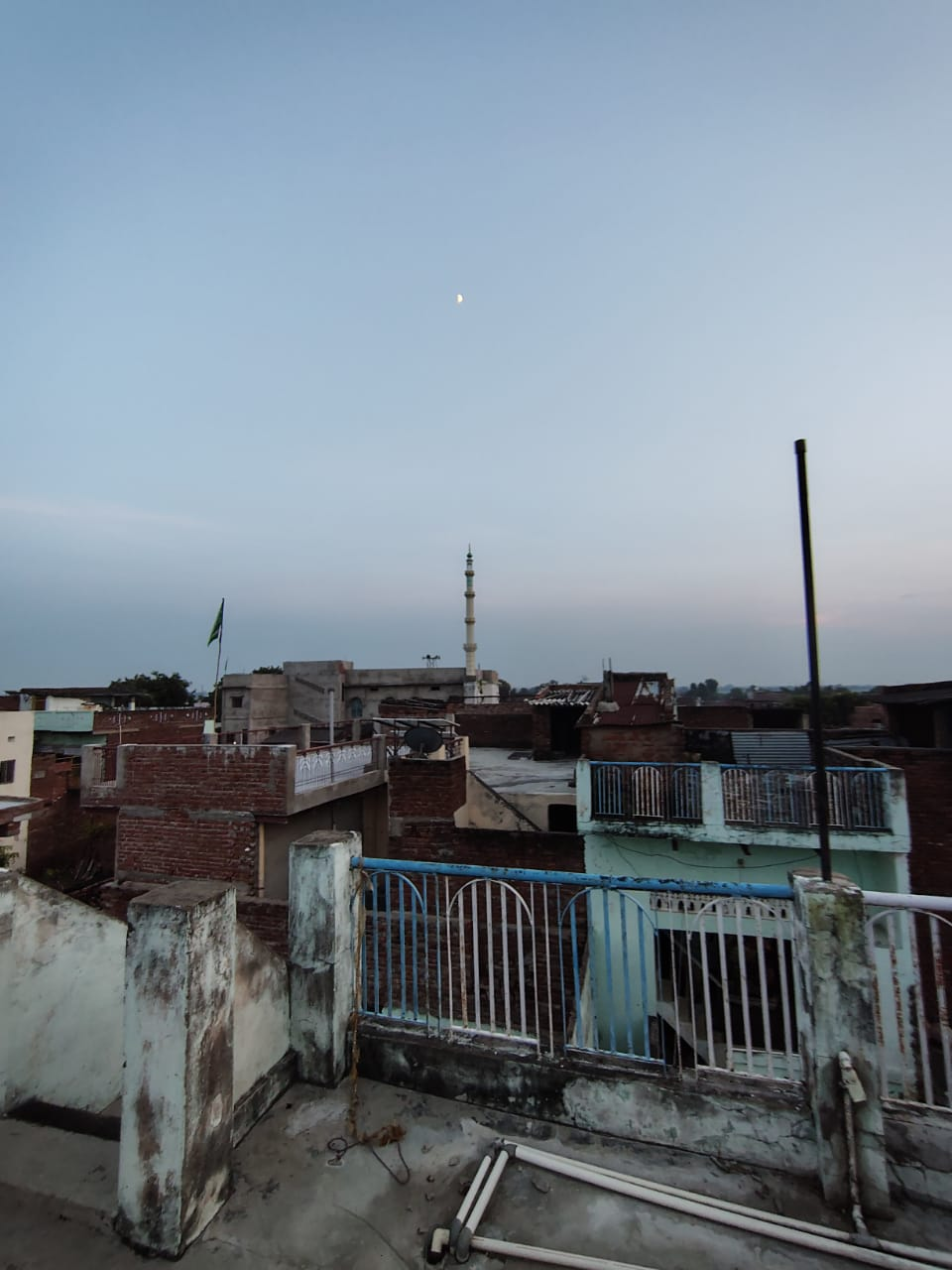
jama masjid of Gorasara
