= Palia (disambiguation) =

Palia is a massively multiplayer online video game.

Palia may also refer to:

- Palia, Pakistan, a village
- Palia Assembly constituency, Uttar Pradesh, India
- Palia Kalan, a city in Uttar Pradesh, India
- Palia, Dildarnagar, a village in India
- A performer of Dasakathia
