= Eknaiya River =

Eknaiya

Location
- Country: India
- State: Uttar Pradesh
- District: Ghazipur

Physical characteristics
- Mouth: Karmanasa River
- Length: 19 km
- Width
  - average: 106 feet (32 m)

The Eknaiya is a small river or a natural tributary of Karmanasah River. Eknaiya is located in Ghazipur District of Uttar Pradesh, India. It plays its role in connecting Ganga River to Karmanasa River. It starts from Zamania and ends at Dewaitha village. Previously it was a large river including many tributaries but as time passed the river started drying up. Now it is often referred to as a natural canal.
