= Kabirpur, Ghazipur =

Kabirpur Rohura
- Village
- Location in Uttar Pradesh, India
- Coordinates: 25.3351118°N 83.6144526°E
- Country: India
- State: Uttar Pradesh
- District: Ghazipur
- Established: 1650; 376 years ago
- Founder: Raja Kabir Khan

Government
  - Type: Panchayati Raj (India)
  - Body: Gram Pradhan

Area
  - Total: 246.1 ha (608 acres)
- Elevation: 70 m (230 ft)

Population (2011)
  - Total: 1,559
  - Density: 633.5/km^{2} (1,641/sq mi)

Languages
  - Official: Bhojpuri, Hindi, Urdu
- Time zone: UTC+5:30 (IST)
- PIN: 232326
- Telephone code: 05497
- Vehicle registration: UP 61

Kabirpur also known as Rohura is a village in Zamania tehsil of Ghazipur District Uttar Pradesh, India. It was a part of Dewaitha but later was made another village in 1953. Kabirpur was established by Raja Kabir Khan (second son of Raja Daud Khan founder of Dewaitha).

== Historical population ==
Population Growth of Dehriya
| Year | Pop. | ±% |
|---|---|---|
| 1861 | 380 | — |
| 1871 | 418 | +10.0% |
| 1881 | 460 | +10.0% |
| 1891 | 505 | +9.8% |
| 1901 | 555 | +9.9% |
| 1911 | 610 | +9.9% |
| 1921 | 672 | +10.2% |
| 1931 | 738 | +9.8% |
| 1941 | 812 | +10.0% |
| 1951 | 800 | −1.5% |
| 1961 | 1,036 | +29.5% |
| 1971 | 1,140 | +10.0% |
| 1981 | 1,208 | +6.0% |
| 1991 | 1,360 | +12.6% |
| 2001 | 1,500 | +10.3% |
| 2011 | 1,559 | +3.9% |
Source:Census of India
