= Sendura =

- village
- Location in Uttar Pradesh, India
- Country: India
- State: Uttar Pradesh
- District: Ghazipur
- Established: 1800; 226 years ago

Government
  - Type: Sarpanch
  - Body: Gram panchayat

Area
  - Total: 279.61 ha (690.9 acres)

Population (2011)
  - Total: 2,315
  - Density: 827.9/km^{2} (2,144/sq mi)

Languages
  - Official: Hindi, Urdu, and Bhojpuri
- Time zone: UTC+5:30 (IST)
- Vehicle registration: UP
- Website: up.gov.in

Sendura is a village in Kamsaar of Ghazipur District in Uttar Pradesh, India. It was a part of Mircha village and its Gram Panchayat but was later, made a separate village. Most of the people living in Sendura are Hindus but it also has large communities of Muslim Pathans from Mircha village and nearby villages. As of the 2011 census the main village of 27 acres and had 371 house holds.

== Historical population ==
Population Growth of Dildarnagar Kamsar
Year	Pop.	±%
1861	258	—
1871	285	+10.5%
1881	325	+14.0%
1891	365	+12.3%
1901	402	+10.1%
1911	462	+14.9%
1921	530	+14.7%
1931	584	+10.2%
1941	642	+9.9%
1951	710	+10.6%
1961	914	+28.7%
1971	1,073	+17.4%
1981	1,190	+10.9%
1991	1,322	+11.1%
2001	1,983	+50.0%
2011	2,315	+16.7%
Source:Census of India
