= Baksara =

Baksara Lalpur
- Village
- Baksara
- Location of Bakainia in Uttar Pradesh
- Country: India
- State: Uttar Pradesh
- District: Ghazipur
- Established: 1660; 366 years ago
- Founder: Zaminadar Lal Khan

Government
  - Type: Gram panchayat
  - Body: Gram pradhan

Area
  - Total: 231.79 ha (572.8 acres)
- Elevation: 72 m (236 ft)

Population (2011)
  - Total: 2,476

Languages
  - Official: Hindi/Urdu
- Time zone: UTC+5:30 (IST)
- PIN: 232326 to** (** area code)
- Vehicle registration: UP 61
- Climate: BW (Köppen)

Baksara or Baksarah is a village of Ghazipur, Uttar Pradesh, India. Baksara village was established by Kamsar Pathans but later most of them migrated from Baksara to Gorasara and Mania village.

== Historical population ==
Population Growth of Baksara
Year	Pop.	±%
1861	623	—
1871	560	−10.1%
1881	500	−10.7%
1891	483	−3.4%
1901	454	−6.0%
1911	432	−4.8%
1921	392	−9.3%
1931	393	+0.3%
1941	357	−9.2%
1951	738	+106.7%
1961	1,325	+79.5%
1971	1,670	+26.0%
1981	1,836	+9.9%
1991	2,020	+10.0%
2001	2,225	+10.1%
2011	2,476	+11.3%
Source:Census of India
