= Gaighat, Ghazipur =

Gaighat
- Village
- Location in Uttar Pradesh, India
- Coordinates: 25.58052°N 83.58058°E
- Country: India
- State: Uttar Pradesh
- District: Ghazipur

Population (2011)
  - Total: 2,281
- PIN: 232331

Gaighat is an Indian village in the town of Zamania within the Ghazipur district of Uttar Pradesh.

== Geography ==
Gaighat is located 35 km south of the district headquarters Ghazipur, 12 km from Zamania, and 363 km from the state capital Lucknow.

Nearby villages include Dhuska (3 km), Deorhi (5 km), Baruin Rural (8 km), Baresar (9 km), and Burhadih (9 km). Gaighat is surrounded by Ramgarh Tehsil and Nuaon Tehsil to the east, Zamania Tehsil to the north, and Durgawati Tehsil to the south.

Gaighat is on the border of the Ghazipur, Kaimur, and Chandauli districts. It is also near the Karamnasha and Ganga rivers, which sometimes causes flooding.

== Demographics ==
As of the 2011 Census of India, there were 2,281 people and 294 houses in the village, including 1,210 males and 1,071 females. There were 326 children aged 0–6, including 186 males and 140 females, making up 14.29% of the total population.

In 2011, the literacy rate among the population was 76.01%, which was above the state-wide rate of 67.68%. The male literacy rate was 88.57% while the female literacy rate was 52.19%.

== Education ==
The main college in Gaigaht is Baudh Sukhnanadan Inter College. Colleges near Gaighat include Hindu Inter College and Hindu P.G. College.

There is also a government-run primary school which teaches through 8th grade.

== Transportation ==
Zamania Railway Station and Bahora Chandil Railway Station are the nearest railway stations to Gaighat. Mughalsarai Junction railway station is a major railway station, located 49 km from Gaighat.
