= Saraila =

Saraila Daulahabad
- village
- Green Farms of Saraila village.

- Location in Uttar Pradesh, India
- Coordinates: 25.3926504°N 83.6663587°E
- Country: India
- State: Uttar Pradesh
- District: Ghazipur
- Established: 1640; 386 years ago
- Founder: Zamindar Mohammed Yar khan

Government
  - Body: Gram panchayat

Area
  - Total: 778.25 ha (1,923.1 acres)
  - Land: 773.462 ha (1,911.27 acres)
  - Water: 4.788 ha (11.83 acres)

Population (2011)
  - Total: 4,465
  - Density: 577.3/km^{2} (1,495/sq mi)

Languages
  - Official: Hindi
- Time zone: UTC+5:30 (IST)
- Vehicle registration: UP
- Website: up.gov.in

Saraila is a village in Kamsaar in the Indian state of Uttar Pradesh.Saraila is a village in Seorai Tehsil in Ghazipur District of Uttar Pradesh, India. It belongs to Varanasi Division . It is located 30 km to the south of District headquarters Ghazipur. 11 km from Seorai. 372 km from State capital Lucknow. The village (or region of the village) was also a part of Daudpur Estate which had its capital at Dewaitha during Mughal and early British era.

Saraila Pin code is 232326 and postal head office is Dildarnagar .

Tajpur Kurra (2 km), Arangi (4 km), Nirahukapura (4 km), Devaitha (4 km), Kajuri ( 4 km), chitarkoni(3 km), Mircha(1.5 km) are the nearby villages to Saraila . Saraila is surrounded by Sevrai Tehsil towards North, Ramgarh Tehsil towards South, Zamania Tehsil towards west.

Zamania, Mohania, Ghazipur, Buxar are the nearby Cities to Saraila

== History ==
Eid Gah of Saraila, built in 1650.

Saraila village was established by Muhammed Yar Khan in 1640 AD, who was the grandson of Sarkar Diwan Kuttul Kan Zamindar Jagirdar taluka Sawerai. Kuttul khan was a great-grandson of Narhar khan founder of kamsar pathans and Dildarnagar kamsar. Kuttul Khan had two sons, Zamindar Hussain Khan and Zamindar Daulah Khan. His second son Zamindar Daulah Khan also had two sons, Muhammad Yar Khan and Muhammad Saleem Khan. Muhammad Yar Khan got the ancestral zamindari of the place and there he established Saraila village. Saleem Khan established Chitarkoni village. When Muhammad Yar Khan established the village he build a Mosque in the village name as Jama Masjid. He also built an Eidgah in the 1650s. Name as Badi eid gah of Saraila. Zamindar Muhammad Yar Khan also built a mosque in the village name as Badi Jumma Masjid later, after 2-3 generations (say, early 1700s) his family made one more mosque in the village name as Choti Jama Masjid. Choti Jama masjid or Nai masjid was later renovated in 2008 by his descendants and village people.

== Agriculture ==
According information village is located in Zamania Tehsil of Ghazipur district in Uttar Pradesh, India. It is situated 15 km away from sub-district headquarter Zamania and 35 km away from district headquarters Ghazipur. Saraila has a total population of 4,465 peoples. There are about 644 houses in Saraila village. Crops which grow in Purvanchal and eastern Bihar are grown in the village. The total area of the village is 1923 acres and crop production area of village is 1890 acres. The village have harvesters and tractors for harvesting activities The village also have mosque, temple and Eidgah. The village also have one English medium private school and government school and Madarsa. The village also have pond and located on the banks of karamnasa river. As of 2011 census the main population of the village lived in an area of 76 acres and had 644 households.

== Historical population ==
Population Growth of Saraila
Year	Pop.	±%
1861	1,600	—
1871	2,008	+25.5%
1881	2,080	+3.6%
1891	2,210	+6.2%
1901	2,320	+5.0%
1911	2,452	+5.7%
1921	2,595	+5.8%
1931	2,756	+6.2%
1941	2,932	+6.4%
1951	3,025	+3.2%
1961	3,022	−0.1%
1971	3,325	+10.0%
1981	3,560	+7.1%
1991	3,942	+10.7%
2001	4,200	+6.5%
2011	4,465	+6.3%
Source:Census of India
