= Umar Ganj, Ghazipur =

Umar Ganj Nariyaon Urf Umar Ganj
- Village
- Location in Uttar Pradesh, India
- Country: India
- State: Uttar Pradesh
- District: Ghazipur
- Established: 1680; 346 years ago
- Founder: Zamindar Umar Khan

Government
  - Type: Panchayati Raj (India)
  - Body: Gram Pradhan

Area
  - Total: 536.56 ha (1,325.9 acres)
- Elevation: 70 m (230 ft)

Population (2011)
  - Total: 7,816
  - Density: 1,457/km^{2} (3,773/sq mi)
- Demonym: Umarganji

Languages
  - Official: Bhojpuri, Hindi, Urdu
- Time zone: UTC+5:30 (IST)
- PIN: 232326
- Telephone code: 05497
- Vehicle registration: UP 61

Umar Ganj (formally known as Nariyaon Urf Umar Ganj) is a village in Zamania tehsil of Ghazipur District, Uttar Pradesh, India. As of the 2011 census, Umar Ganj had a total population of 7,816 and a geographical area of 536.56 hectares.

Umar Ganj was established as a market area by local zamindars and banias. It was a seat of zamindari of Umarganj urf Khizirpur, also known as Khizri shaheed.
