= Kahraicha =

Kaharaicha Kadirpur
- village
- Interactive map of Kaharaicha
- Coordinates: 25.3636081°N 83.6171388°E
- Country: India
- State: Uttar Pradesh
- District: Ghazipur
- Settled: 1780; 246 years ago

Government
  - Body: Gram panchayat

Area
  - Total: 327.36 ha (808.9 acres)
  - Land: 319.605 ha (789.76 acres)
  - Water: 7.755 ha (19.16 acres)

Population (2011)
  - Total: 1,145
  - Density: 358.3/km^{2} (927.9/sq mi)

Languages
  - Official: Hindi
- Time zone: UTC+5:30 (IST)
- Vehicle registration: UP
- Website: up.gov.in

Kahraicha is a village of Kamsaar in Ghazipur district of Uttar Pradesh, India. The village Raimala also is a lart of Khraicha making it a village of hectares. As of 2011 census the main population of the village lived in an area 12 acres and 165 house holds.

== Historical population ==
Population Growth of Kahriacha
Year	Pop.	±%
1861	50	—
1871	55	+10.0%
1881	62	+12.7%
1891	61	−1.6%
1901	65	+6.6%
1911	70	+7.7%
1921	78	+11.4%
1931	102	+30.8%
1941	134	+31.4%
1951	430	+220.9%
1961	903	+110.0%
1971	900	−0.3%
1981	870	−3.3%
1991	880	+1.1%
2001	1,100	+25.0%
2011	1,145	+4.1%
Source:Census of India
