= Rasulpur newada =

Rasulpur Rasulpur, Mahmudpur, Dewaitha Khurd
- Village
- Rasulpur Newada
- Frams of Rasulpur Newada

- Location of Rasupur Newada in Uttar Pradesh
- Coordinates: 25.3737362°N 83.6324100°E
- Country: India
- State: Uttar Pradesh
- District: Ghazipur
- Established: 1660; 366 years ago
- Founder: Zamindar Mahmud Khan

Government
  - Type: Gram panchayat
  - Body: Sarpanch

Area
  - Total: 263.03 ha (650.0 acres)
  - Land: 255.013 ha (630.15 acres)
  - Water: 8.017 ha (19.81 acres)
- Elevation: 72 m (236 ft)

Population (2011)
  - Total: 1,181

Languages
  - Official: Hindi/Urdu
- Time zone: UTC+5:30 (IST)
- PIN: 232326 to** (** area code)
- Vehicle registration: UP 61
- Sex ratio: 926 (2011) ♂/♀
- Climate: BW (Köppen)

Rasulpur newada is a village of Kamsaar in Ghazipur district, Uttar Pradesh, India. As of 2011 census the main population of Rasulpur lived in an area of 7.5 acres.

== Historical population ==
Population Growth of Dildarnagar Kamsar
Year	Pop.	±%
1861	850	—
1871	935	+10.0%
1881	1,028	+9.9%
1891	886	−13.8%
1901	975	+10.0%
1911	1,072	+9.9%
1921	1,170	+9.1%
1931	1,298	+10.9%
1941	1,427	+9.9%
1951	1,359	−4.8%
1961	1,130	−16.9%
1971	1,070	−5.3%
1981	996	−6.9%
1991	1,096	+10.0%
2001	1,105	+0.8%
2011	1,181	+6.9%
Source:Census of India
