= Machhti =

Coordinates: 25°36′N 83°51′E

Machhti Murtazapur
- village
- Interactive map of Machhti
- Country: India
- State: Uttar Pradesh
- District: Ghazipur
- Founder: Murtaza Khan

Government
  - Body: Gram panchayat

Area
  - Total: 522 ha (1,290 acres)

Population (2001)
  - Total: 1,680
  - Density: 322/km^{2} (834/sq mi)

Languages
  - Official: Hindi
- Time zone: UTC+5:30 (IST)

Machhti is a village in Mohammadabad Tehsil in the Ghazipur in the Indian state of Uttar Pradesh.
