= Palia, Dildarnagar =

Palia Tajpur Palia
- village
- Interactive map of Palia
- Country: India
- State: Uttar Pradesh
- District: Ghazipur
- Established: 1750; 276 years ago

Government
  - Body: Gram panchayat

Area
  - Total: 264.35 ha (653.2 acres)

Population (2011)
  - Total: 1,777
  - Density: 672.2/km^{2} (1,741/sq mi)

Languages
  - Official: Hindi
- Time zone: UTC+5:30 (IST)
- Vehicle registration: UP

Palia is a village of Dildarnagar Kamsar located in Ghazipur District of Uttar Pradesh, India.

== Historical population ==
Population Growth of Palia
Year	Pop.	±%
1861	31	—
1871	34	+9.7%
1881	38	+11.8%
1891	43	+13.2%
1901	48	+11.6%
1911	56	+16.7%
1921	78	+39.3%
1931	87	+11.5%
1941	106	+21.8%
1951	678	+539.6%
1961	1,256	+85.3%
1971	1,309	+4.2%
1981	1,350	+3.1%
1991	1,460	+8.1%
2001	1,680	+15.1%
2011	1,777	+5.8%
Source:Census of India
