= Arangi, Ghazipur =

Arangi Kurrah Khurd
- Village
- Farms of Arangi village of Kamsar

- Location in Uttar Pradesh, India Arangi (India)
- Coordinates: 25.400°N 83.706°E
- Country: India
- State: Uttar Pradesh
- District: Ghazipur
- First Settled: 1700; 326 years ago
- Founded: 1780; 246 years ago

Government
  - Body: Gram panchayat

Area
  - Total: 278.16 ha (687.3 acres)

Population (2011)
  - Total: 3,006
  - Density: 1,081/km^{2} (2,799/sq mi)

Languages
  - Official: Hindi
  - Others: Bhojpuri, Urdu
- Time zone: UTC+5:30 (IST)
- PIN: 232330
- Vehicle registration: UP
- Literacy: 20%
- Website: up.gov.in

Arangi is a small village of Kamsaar located in Seorai tehsil of Ghazipur district, Uttar Pradesh, India. The village is located in the eastern parts Varanasi division, situated almost at the border of Uttar Pradesh and Bihar, on the left bank of the river Karmnasha. Arangi contains an old monument to Buddha.

== Demography ==
As of 2011 Census, the village has a population of 3,006 of whom 1565 are males while 1441 are females. A total of 425 families reside here. The population of children in the 0-6 age group is 536 which makes up 17.83% of total population of the village. The average sex ratio is 921, which is higher than the Uttar Pradesh state average of 912. The child sex ratio for the Arangi as per the census is 928, higher than the Uttar Pradesh average of 902. The literacy rate in the village was 70.40%, which higher than the Uttar Pradesh state average of 67.68%. The male literacy was recorded 83.29% and the female literacy rate was 56.38%. As of 2011 census the main population of the village lived in an area 36.5 acres and 425 house holds.

=== Historical population ===
Population Growth of Arangi
Year	Pop.	±%
1861	200	—
1871	220	+10.0%
1881	245	+11.4%
1891	268	+9.4%
1901	295	+10.1%
1911	325	+10.2%
1921	356	+9.5%
1931	392	+10.1%
1941	432	+10.2%
1951	658	+52.3%
1961	1,020	+55.0%
1971	1,085	+6.4%
1981	1,462	+34.7%
1991	1,733	+18.5%
2001	2,600	+50.0%
2011	3,006	+15.6%
Source:Census of India
