= Sihani =

- Village
- Sihani
- Nickname: Chitrakoni Khurd
- Location of Sihani in Uttar Pradesh
- Coordinates: 25°22′30″N 83°39′52″E
- Country: India
- State: Uttar Pradesh
- District: Ghazipur
- Established: 1780; 246 years ago

Government
  - Type: Gram panchayat
  - Body: Gram pradhan

Area
  - Total: 244.73 ha (604.7 acres)
- Elevation: 72 m (236 ft)

Population (2011)
  - Total: 1,307

Languages
  - Official: Hindi/Urdu
- Time zone: UTC+5:30 (IST)
- PIN: 232326 to** (** area code)
- Vehicle registration: UP 61
- Climate: BW (Köppen)

Sihani is a village in Kamsaar, in Ghazipur district, Uttar Pradesh, India. As of the 2011 census, the main population of the village lived on 18.7 acres and had 220 households.

== Historical population ==
Population growth
Year	Pop.	±%
1861	153	—
1871	168	+9.8%
1881	182	+8.3%
1891	205	+12.6%
1901	225	+9.8%
1911	248	+10.2%
1921	272	+9.7%
1931	300	+10.3%
1941	320	+6.7%
1951	400	+25.0%
1961	520	+30.0%
1971	610	+17.3%
1981	672	+10.2%
1991	738	+9.8%
2001	812	+10.0%
2011	1,307	+61.0%
Source:Census of India
