= Arangi, Chandauli =

Arangi
- Village
- Interactive map of Arangi
- Country: India
- State: Uttar Pradesh
- District: Chandauli

Population (2011)
  - Total: 3,049

Arangi is a village in Chandauli district, Uttar Pradesh, India.

== Demography ==
As of the 2011 census, this village had a total population of 3,049 of which 1,512 are male while 1,537 are female. A majority is part of the Rajput population known as nagvanshi rajputs. Arangi comes under Chandauli tehsil, Barahani block and Kandwa police station in Chandauli district. Arangi village is situated on the banks of Karmnasa river. Most of the population is dependent on agriculture but now people are also getting employed in government jobs. Ramleela of Arangi is very famous. Thakurbari temple, Shankar bhagwan temple, Satti mata temple and Shayar mata templeare the famous temples here. For studies, in Arangi, there are primary, middle and high schools along with college for intermediate and graduation. There is a beautiful Panchayat building here. Arangi produces abundant paddy and wheat crops and cultivates a wide variety of cereals and vegetables. The government purchases grain for farmers at the MSP. Arangi is now rapidly developing and its people are becoming increasingly aware. Arangi village is playing a strong role in Chandauli as well as Uttar Pradesh development.
