= Kadirpur, Ghazipur =

Kadirpur
- Hamlet
- Interactive map of Kadirpur
- Coordinates: 25.376°N 83.624°E
- Country: India
- State: Uttar Pradesh
- District: Ghazipur
- Established: 1765; 261 years ago
- Founder: Zamindar Kadir Khan

Government
  - Body: Gram panchayat

Area
  - Total: 117.89 ha (291.3 acres)

Languages
  - Official: Hindi
- Time zone: UTC+5:30 (IST)
- Vehicle registration: UP

Kadirpur is a hamlet of Dildarnagar Kamsar located in Ghazipur District of Uttar Pradesh, India.
