= Kamesaradih, Dildarnagar =

Kamesaradih Kamsaar, Kamsaar Kot
- Hamlet
- Interactive map of Kamesaradih
- Coordinates: 25.3782322°N 83.6812332°E
- Country: India
- State: Uttar Pradesh
- District: Ghazipur
- Established: 1542; 484 years ago
- Founder: Narhar Khan

Government
  - Body: Gram panchayat

Area
  - Total: 72.33 ha (178.7 acres)

Population (2011)
  - Total: 0
  - Density: 0.0/km^{2} (0.0/sq mi)

Languages
  - Official: Hindi
- Time zone: UTC+5:30 (IST)
- Vehicle registration: UP

Kamesarahdih is a hamlet of Dildarnagar Kamsar located in Ghazipur District of Uttar Pradesh, India. Kamesaradih is the main and a historical place of Dildarnagar Kamsar from where Kamsaar Pathans emerged and got their name Kamsaar. Kamesaradih have a kot which was built by Raja Narhar Khan in 1542s. The kot present in Kamesaradih is now under Archaeological Survey of India.
