= Khizirpur Mathare =

Khiddipur-Mathare Ali Nagar
- village
- Interactive map of Khiddipur-Mathare
- Coordinates: 25.4492388°N 83.5759867°E
- Country: India
- State: Uttar Pradesh
- District: Ghazipur
- Established: 1630; 391 years ago
- Founder: Zamindar Wasim Khan & Zamindar Numan Khan

Government
  - Body: Gram panchayat

Area
  - Total: 305.05 ha (753.8 acres)

Population (2011)
  - Total: 6,814
  - Density: 2,234/km^{2} (5,785/sq mi)

Languages
  - Official: Hindi
- Time zone: UTC+5:30 (IST)
- Vehicle registration: UP
- Website: up.gov.in

Khizirpur-Alinagar is a village in Dildarnagar kamsar founded by Zamindaar Imran Khan & Zamindaar Numan Khan who came from Usia, Dildarnagar village of kamsar-o-bar Dildarnagar in the Indian state of Uttar Pradesh.

== Historical population ==
Population Growth of Khizirpur-Mathere
Year	Pop.	±%
1861	2,277	—
1871	2,505	+10.0%
1881	2,750	+9.8%
1891	3,031	+10.2%
1901	3,335	+10.0%
1911	3,665	+9.9%
1921	4,035	+10.1%
1931	4,438	+10.0%
1941	4,882	+10.0%
1951	5,126	+5.0%
1961	5,100	−0.5%
1971	5,620	+10.2%
1981	6,171	+9.8%
1991	6,680	+8.2%
2001	6,790	+1.6%
2011	6,814	+0.4%
Source:Census of India
