= Kurrah =

Kurrah Dildarnagar Tajpur Usmanabad
- village
- Lawishely Green farms of Tajpur Kurrah village during Monsoon.
- Nickname: Coconut village of the North India
- Location in Uttar Pradesh, India
- Coordinates: 25.3876048°N 83.6880159°E
- Country: India
- State: Uttar Pradesh
- District: Ghazipur
- Established: 1570; 456 years ago
- Founder: Zamindar Usman khan

Government
  - Body: Gram panchayat

Area
  - Total: 450.34 ha (1,112.8 acres)
  - Land: 440.025 ha (1,087.33 acres)
  - Water: 10.315 ha (25.49 acres)

Population (2011)
  - Total: 7,368
  - Density: 1,674/km^{2} (4,337/sq mi)

Languages
  - Official: Hindi
- Time zone: UTC+5:30 (IST)

Kurrah or Tajpur Kurrah is a village in Dildarnagar Kamsar region of Zamania tehsil in Ghazipur district. It is a village of pathan Kamsaari pathans in the Indian state of Uttar Pradesh. Almost 3900 Kamsaar Pathans lived in the village as of 2011.

== History ==
The Tajpur kurrah village was founded by Zamindar Usman khan a son of Narhar Khan founder of kamsar pathans and founder of Dildarnagar kamsar. Before Usman established this village his father Narhar Khan lived at a place in village name as Kamesardih. According to the old records of village it is said the village would be founded in late 1500 ADs. This village also consists of Naresh ka Dera which is named after Chowdhary Naresh Yadav.

== Agriculture ==
The village is situated at the banks of durgavati and karamnasa river and have good crop producing soil.

A view of Karmanasa River during early Summers.

The Kramnasa river passes 3.2 kilometer from the village. The total area of the village is 1112 acres out of which the total crop production area of the village is 1000 acres. A variety of crops grow in Purvanchal and Bihar. The village has tractors, harvester etc. The village also have one Eidgah.

Coconut trees in Tajpur Kurrah village.

As of 2011 census, the main population of the village lives in an area of 111 acres with the total number of 976 house holds.

== Historical population ==
Population Growth of Tajpur-Kurrah
Year	Pop.	±%
1861	2,535	—
1871	2,788	+10.0%
1881	3,066	+10.0%
1891	3,374	+10.0%
1901	3,712	+10.0%
1911	4,082	+10.0%
1921	4,490	+10.0%
1931	4,940	+10.0%
1941	5,435	+10.0%
1951	5,434	−0.0%
1961	5,400	−0.6%
1971	5,940	+10.0%
1981	6,534	+10.0%
1991	7,100	+8.7%
2001	6,910	−2.7%
2011	7,316	+5.9%
Source:Census of India

Dr irshad khan Dr nawaz khan Dr tarannum khan Drx nusrat khan
