= Usia, Dildarnagar =

Usia
- Village
- Farms in Usia

- Location of Usia in Uttar Pradesh
- Coordinates: 25.4309°N 83.7075°E
- Country: India
- State: Uttar Pradesh
- District: Ghazipur
- Established: 1570; 456 years ago
- Founder: zamindarJahangir Khan and zamindar Barbal khan

Government
  - Type: Gram Pradhan
  - Body: Gram Panchayat

Area
  - Total: 2,077 ha (5,130 acres)
  - Land: 2,037.534 ha (5,034.86 acres)
  - Water: 39.466 ha (97.52 acres)

Population (2011)
  - Total: 24,786
  - Density: 1,216.5/km^{2} (3,150.6/sq mi)
- Demonym: Kamsaari

Languages
  - official language: Hindi, Bhojpuri
- Time zone: UTC+5:30 (IST)
- Postal code: 232330
- ISO 3166 code: IN-UP
- Vehicle registration: UP 61

Biggest Masjid of Usia, originally built in 1580 and renovated in 1960 (side view).

Usia is a village in Kamsaar, Uttar Pradesh, India. It is located southeast of Ghazipur and east of Dildarnagar, near the Bihar State border. The village has a population of 24,786 residents living in 3,471 households. Usia is approximately 7 km from Dildarnagar. Around 8500 Kamsar Pathans lived here as of 2011.

== History ==
The village of Usia was founded by Zamindar Jahangir Khan and Zamindar Barbal Khan, sons of Raja Narhar Khan, the founder of Dildarnagar Kamsar in late 1500s. The Pathans of Usia, who are descendants of Jahangir Khan and Barbal Khan, are known as Kamsar Pathans. They built the old Jama Masjid and Eidgah in the village.

The largest mosque in Usia was constructed in the 1500s. Although it has undergone multiple renovations, an image from 1985 provides a glimpse of its historical structure. Historically, the Kamsar region encompassed a significant tract of land near the Karamnasa River. Following the early settlement of Usia, some descendants of Jahangir Khan established Khajuri village. In the 1800s, Khizirpur village was founded by Zamindar Numan Khan and Zamindar Wasim Khan, who hailed from Usia and shared the same lineage.

The land of Usia was once held by the Musalman Rajputs of the Sikarwar clan, known as Kamsari Pathans. However, in 1810, it was acquired by Deokinandan Singh, a Bhumihar from Allahabad and an Amil (revenue collector). Using a combination of revenue farming and legal tactics, Deokinandan, the ruler of the Anapur estate, amassed vast properties across Ghazipur, Ballia, Gorakhpur, and Allahabad. As an Amil, he collected land revenue from zamindars and paid it to the British, keeping a share as his interest. These acquisition methods caused deep resentment among the dispossessed zamindars, particularly during British rule.

This resentment culminated in an incident in 1855 when Lakshmi Narayan, the agent of Deokinandan's grandson, was murdered by Faujdar Ali Khan of Usia. The villagers had long harbored discontent with British rule and the humiliation caused by the Anapur estate. When a British officer interrogated Faujdar Ali Khan, asking how many people he could rally for a revolt if freed, he boldly replied, "Twenty thousand." To suppress potential rebellion, Faujdar Ali Khan was executed by hanging.

Two years later, in the 1857, under the leadership of Major Salamat Ali Khan, Subedar Alam Shah Khan, and Ibrahim Khan of Usia, the former zamindars joined the Indian Rebellion of 1857, led by Kunwar Singh of Jagdishpur. Eventually, the zamindars of Usia regained their ancestral estate, marking a pivotal moment in the region's history. According to the Gazetteer of Ghazipur, Usia in 1901 covered an area of 6,799 acres (10,888 bighas) and paid a revenue of Rs. 4,771.

After the dispute between the Anapur estate and the people of Usia, the estate decided to appoint representatives from Usia to mediate conflicts. The last such representative was Maulvi Zamir Ahmad Nuhi (1892–1973), a writer and poet. He served as the manager of the Anapur estate until 1947. Following his retirement, he founded Jamia Arabia Makhzanul Uloom in 1952, which is now recognized as the largest madarsa in Ghazipur.

The village is also home to the Dildarnagar Fatehpur bazaar, established in 1874 near the Dildarnagar railway station by the zamindars of Usia. This contributed significantly to the area's economic development. Usia has also produced notable figures, including Sir Deputy Muhammad Sayed Khan, a social reformer who established SKBM Degree College and worked tirelessly for the upliftment of the Kamsar region. Additionally, Nazir Hussain Khan, a renowned Indian film actor and director, hailed from Usia.

=== Historical population ===
Population Growth of Usia
| Year | Pop. | ±% |
|---|---|---|
| 1865 | 5,689 | — |
| 1881 | 5,439 | −4.4% |
| 1891 | 6,054 | +11.3% |
| 1901 | 6,016 | −0.6% |
| 1911 | 6,612 | +9.9% |
| 1921 | 7,275 | +10.0% |
| 1931 | 8,050 | +10.7% |
| 1941 | 8,855 | +10.0% |
| 1951 | 9,228 | +4.2% |
| 1961 | 10,715 | +16.1% |
| 1971 | 11,787 | +10.0% |
| 1981 | 12,965 | +10.0% |
| 1991 | 15,038 | +16.0% |
| 2001 | 18,562 | +23.4% |
| 2011 | 24,786 | +33.5% |
Source:Census of India

== Notable people ==
- Nazir Hussain, actor
- Saima Khan, Indian Revenue Service (IRS)
- Syed Ahmad Khan, deputy
- Haroon Rasheed Alig (Journalist)
- Mohammad Haider Ali Khan (Journalist, ASST Editor National Herald)
