= Bhaksi =

Coordinates: 25°25′N 83°39′E

Bhaksi Sarwar pur
- village
- Interactive map of Bhaksi
- Country: India
- State: Uttar Pradesh
- District: Ghazipur
- Established: 1630; 396 years ago
- Founder: Zamindar Sarwar Khan

Government
  - Body: Gram panchayat

Area
  - Total: 2.1533 km^{2} (0.8314 sq mi)
  - Land: 205.628 ha (508.12 acres)
  - Water: 9.702 ha (23.97 acres)

Population (2011)
  - Total: 3,057
  - Density: 1,420/km^{2} (3,677/sq mi)

Languages
  - Official: Hindi
- Time zone: UTC+5:30 (IST)

Bhaksi is a village in Kamsaar in the Indian state of Uttar Pradesh. As of 2011 census the main population of the village lived in an area of 27.2 acres and had 426 households.

== Historical population ==
Population Growth of Bhaksi
Year	Pop.	±%
1861	2,600	—
1871	2,860	+10.0%
1881	3,140	+9.8%
1891	3,460	+10.2%
1901	3,806	+10.0%
1911	4,187	+10.0%
1921	4,610	+10.1%
1931	5,170	+12.1%
1941	5,700	+10.3%
1951	3,850	−32.5%
1961	3,472	−9.8%
1971	3,300	−5.0%
1981	3,205	−2.9%
1991	3,030	−5.5%
2001	3,035	+0.2%
2011	3,057	+0.7%
Source:Census of India
