= Mohammadganj =

Mohammadganj Mohsinnagar
- Block / Village / Panchayat /
- Location in jharkhand, India
- Coordinates: 24.20°N 84.17°E
- Country: India
- State: Jharkhand
- District: Palamu

Government
  - MLA: Kamlesh Kumar Singh; Nationalist Congress Party

Population (2011)
  - Total: 47,315

Languages
  - Official: Magahi, Hindi
- Time zone: UTC+5:30 (IST)
- PIN: 822120
- Website: palamu.nic.in/Mohammadganj.html

Mohammadganj is a community development block located in Palamu district of Jharkhand state in India. There are total 43 revenue villages in Mohammadganj Block. Mohammadganj alias Mohsin Nagar is also a gram panchayat in the list of these villages. There is tourist palace called Bhim Chulha, located on the banks of North Koel River. The nearby barrage on North Koel River is named as Bheem Barrage.

Schools in Mohammadganj

1. Upgraded High School, Station Road
2. N K P High School, Colony
3. Shishu Shiksha Mandir School, Mohammadganj

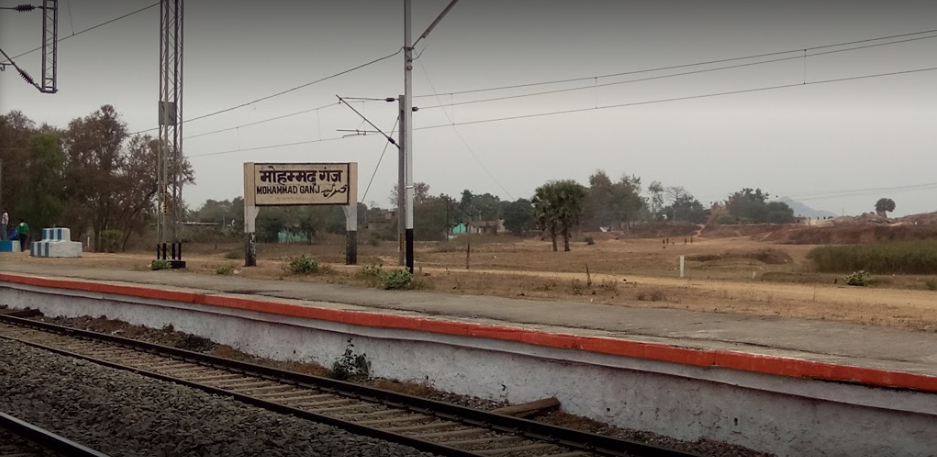
Muhammad ganj station
