= Bara, Ghazipur =

Bara
- Village
- Aerial view
- Interactive map of Bara
- Coordinates: 25°30′41″N 83°51′17″E
- Country: India
- State: Uttar Pradesh
- District: Ghazipur
- Established: 1400s

Government
  - Type: Indian government
  - Body: Gram panchayat

Area
  - Total: 12.33 km^{2} (4.76 sq mi)

Population (2011)
  - Total: 21,405
  - Density: 1,736/km^{2} (4,496/sq mi)

Languages
  - Official: Hindi
  - Native: Bhojpuri Language
- Time zone: UTC+5:30 (IST)
- 232325: 232325
- ISO 3166 code: IN-UP
- Vehicle registration: UP 61
- Website: up.gov.in

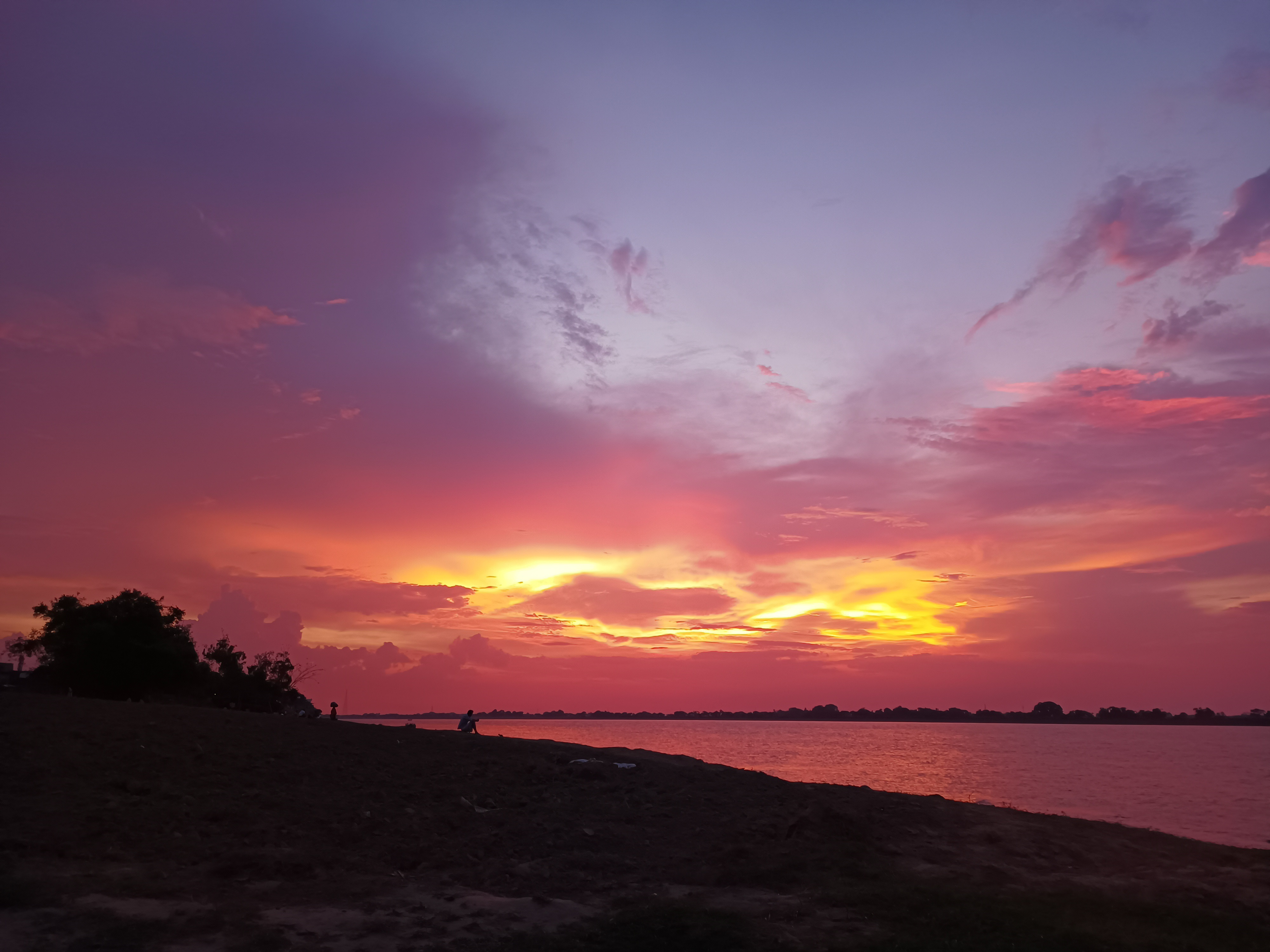
Bara -Evening view at Ganga River

Bara is a village located in the Dildarnagar Kamsar region of Ghazipur district, in the Indian state of Uttar Pradesh. It is situated along the banks of the holy river Ganges, offering a scenic and culturally rich environment.

The village has a predominantly Muslim (Pathan) population and is known for its communal harmony and active participation in sports. Local sports are an integral part of village life, with teams such as the Bara Cricket Club and Bara Football Club regularly engaging in regional tournaments.

The village hosts a higher secondary educational institution, Bara Inter College, which serves students from Bara and nearby villages.

Bara is particularly noted for its traditional horse racing events, which are held annually and attract nearly 500 participants from across the region, making it a prominent cultural attraction in eastern Uttar Pradesh. Every year nearly 500 participants attend. The race is done with fifty horses.

== History ==
an old monument, a tomb of an army chief in who died during the Battle of Chausa

According to the old books and sayings it is said that the Bara village was established by the family Cherus. Tikam deo was a King of chero Dynasty and a ruler of Birpur estate. Later Kam dev and Dham dev came to this region and Tikam deo Lost the power and Birpur came in direct control of them and later Kamsar jagir. After Tikam deo Lost his estate his descendants name as Rajdhar Rai, Mukund Rai, and Pithaur Rai out of three brothers, one brother settled at Birpur, and one brother established Narayanpur and Ujjar villages. Later their family established many villages near Birpur.

One brother adopted Islam in early 16th century, on getting influenced by a Sufi Saint and established bara. The brother who adopted Islam and his descendants were in a good relationship from Kamsar because of which many Kamsar pathans settled at Bara and family from bara settled in different villages of Kamsar. Originally the land on which bara stands was a part of Kamsar Jagir . Bara was also a pargana of Kamsaar. The desendets of the old family of Raizada after adopting Islam are known as Bar pathans,. At Birpur, Where one brother In the Mughal period and subsequently to the British Imperialism, it lies on an important route of Delhi to Kolkata, and there were constant movement of businessmen and traders.

The village has a railway station known as Bara kalan station. During Mughals the Bara was also a trade centre because of its distance from the ganga river. An old port in Bara was built in the early 1600s. Bara witnessed the Battle of Chausa, a military engagement between the Mughal Emperor Humayun, and the Pathan Sher Shah Suri, fought on 26 June 1539, 2 km away.

=== Historical population of Bara ===
Population Growth of Bara village
Year	Pop.	±%
1851	6,675	—
1861	5,401	−19.1%
1871	5,424	+0.4%
1881	5,360	−1.2%
1891	5,954	+11.1%
1901	5,260	−11.7%
1911	6,049	+15.0%
1921	6,956	+15.0%
1931	8,020	+15.3%
1941	9,200	+14.7%
1951	10,166	+10.5%
1961	11,232	+10.5%
1971	13,020	+15.9%
1981	15,621	+20.0%
1991	18,105	+15.9%
2001	19,916	+10.0%
2011	21,405	+7.5%
Source:Census of India

== Agriculture ==
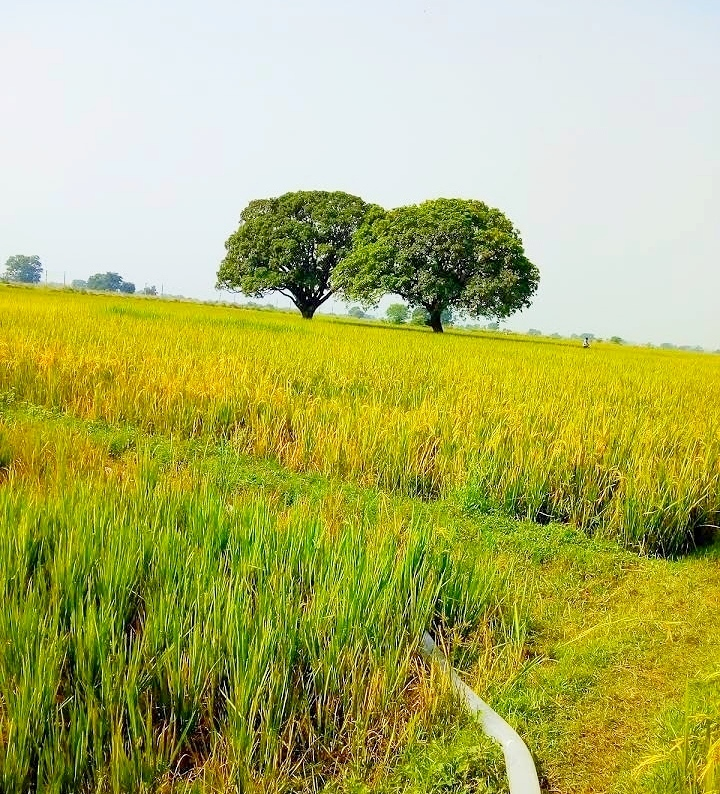
A farm in Bara.

Agriculture is the main employment in the village. More than 2500 acres of land are used for agriculture. All kinds of machinery like tractors, combine harvesters, balers etc. are used in the village. The village has a good water supply for irrigation purposes. Most people have their own tube wells or other things for irrigation. The village is near to Dildarnagar and Chausa which are some of the main markets for agriculture. The village is surrounded by two river name as Karmanasa and Ganges. The soil of the village is good for farming. All kinds of crops which are grown in Purvanchal and Buxar district are grown in the village.

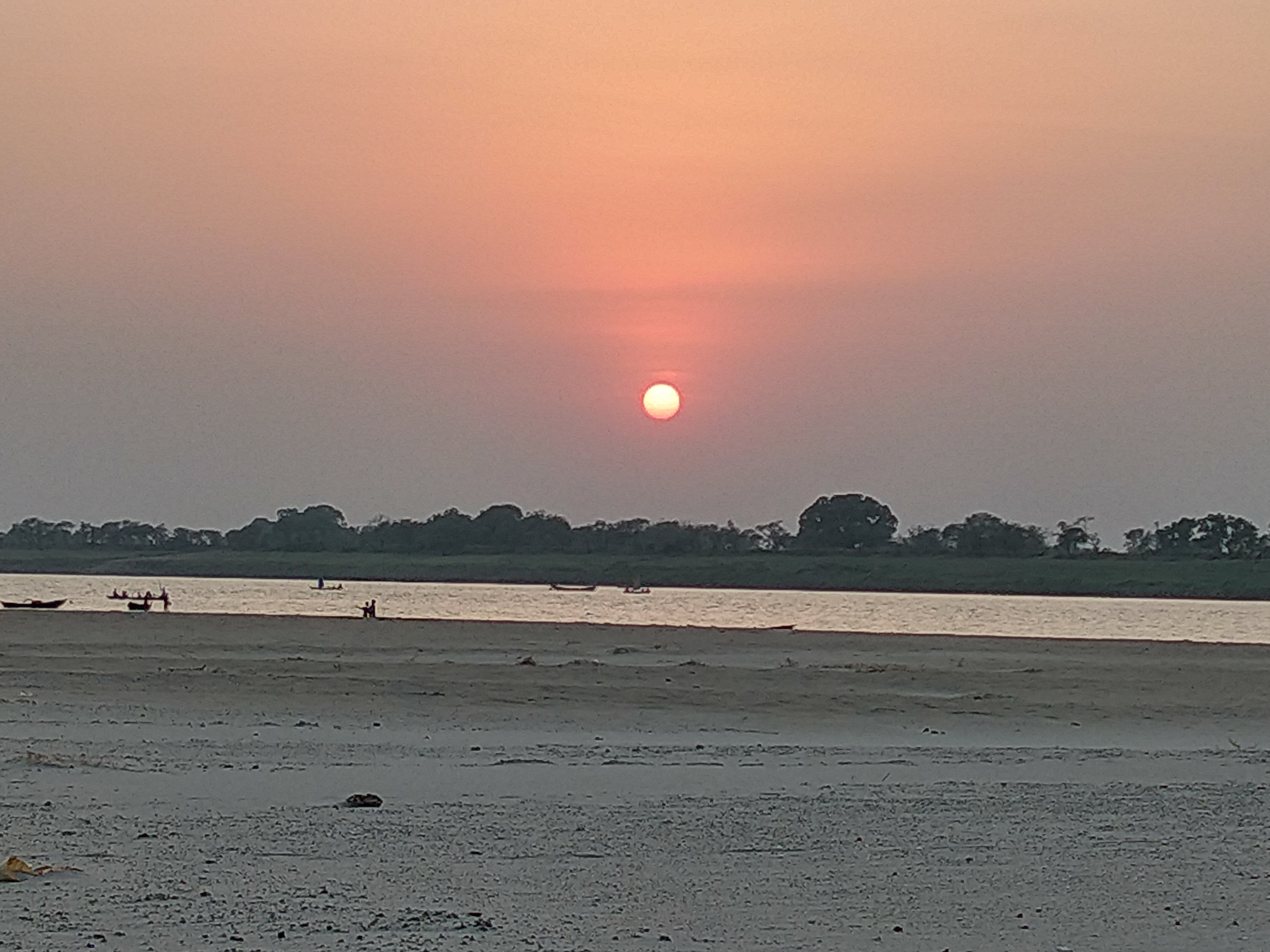
Ganga River sunset view

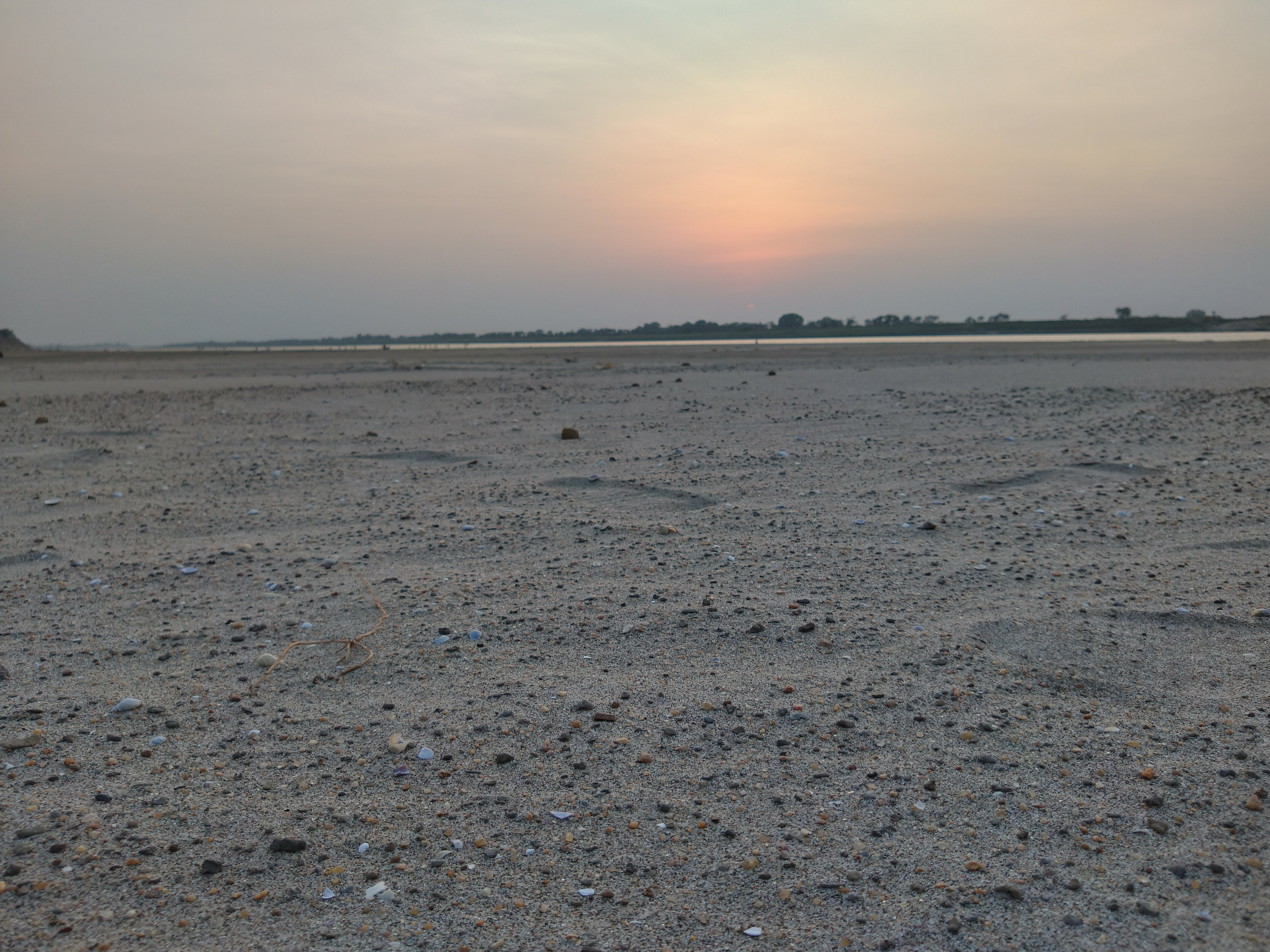
Ganga River beach at Bara

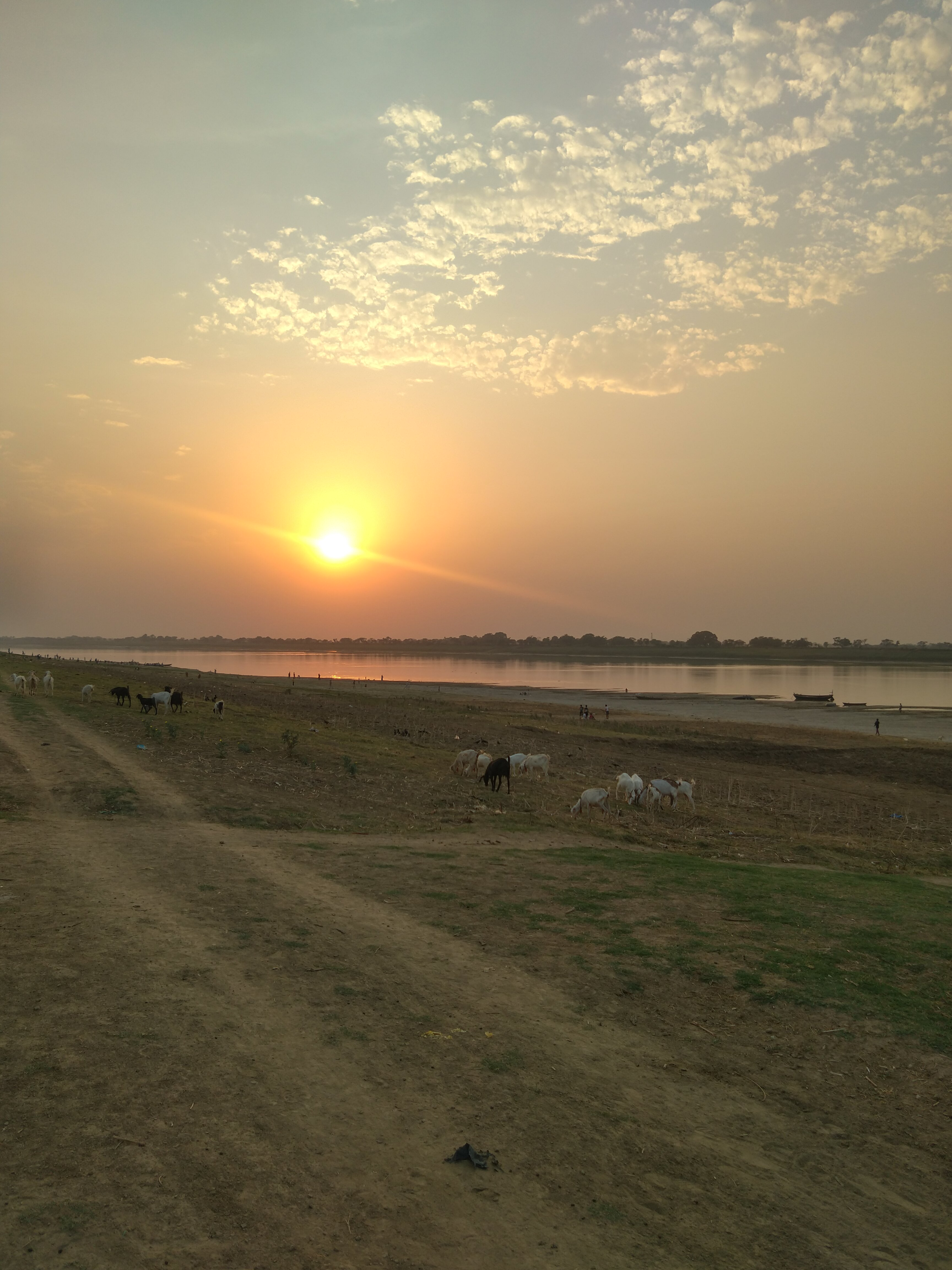
Sunset at Bara

Watermelon is grown at a large scale in the village as Ganges river passes about 4.8 kilometres from the village. The village has many ponds.

== Transport ==
Barakalan Halt railway station, Gahmar railway station, Dildarnagar junction and Buxar junction are the closest railway stations to Bara. The nearest airport is in Varanasi, Lal Bahadur Shastri International Airport and Sri Rajendra Nagar Patna Airport.
