= Anapur =

Anapur is a village in Jaunpur, Uttar Pradesh, India.

Anapur village is located 12 mahrajganj block distance 12 km.
