= Khajuri, Dildarnagar =

Khajuri Kamsar Khajuri Dildarnagar
- village
- A view of Khajuri village

- Location in Uttar Pradesh, India
- Country: India
- State: Uttar Pradesh
- District: Ghazipur
- Established: 1630; 396 years ago
- Founder: Zamindar Hesam Khan

Government
  - Body: Gram panchayat

Area
  - Total: 291.56 ha (720.5 acres)
  - Land: 286.493 ha (707.94 acres)
  - Water: 5.067 ha (12.52 acres)

Population (2011)
  - Total: 3,771
  - Density: 1,316/km^{2} (3,409/sq mi)

Languages
  - Official: Hindi, Bhojpuri
- Time zone: UTC+5:30 (IST)
- Postal code: 232330
- ISO 3166 code: IN-UP
- Vehicle registration: UP 61
- Website: up.gov.in

Khajuri Kamsar is a village in Dildarnagar Kamsar in the Indian state of Uttar Pradesh. Its situated on the bank of Karamsaha. As of 2011 census the main population of the village lived in an area of 44 acres with 531 households.

== Historical population ==
Population Growth of Khajuri
Year	Pop.	±%
1861	1,043	—
1871	1,137	+9.0%
1881	1,240	+9.1%
1891	1,355	+9.3%
1901	1,480	+9.2%
1911	1,642	+10.9%
1921	1,800	+9.6%
1931	1,970	+9.4%
1941	2,160	+9.6%
1951	2,190	+1.4%
1961	2,257	+3.1%
1971	2,565	+13.6%
1981	2,789	+8.7%
1991	3,238	+16.1%
2001	3,512	+8.5%
2011	3,771	+7.4%
Source:Census of India
