= Deokinandan Singh =

Deokinandan Singh, an Indian politician and trade unionist.

As of 1973, Singh was a member of the General Council of the All India Trade Union Congress.

Singh was elected to the Bihar Legislative Assembly in an 18 March 1979 by-election in the Matihani seat. Singh obtained 25,660 votes, defeating the Indian National Congress (I) candidate Vashishth Narayan Singh and Mithilesh Kumar Singh of the Janata Party. The by-election had been called following the murder of communist legislator Sitaram Mishra in 1978.

Singh contested the Matihani seat again in the Legislative Assembly elections of 1980 and 1985. He finished in second place both times, with 23,796 votes (36.18%) in 1980 and 30,542 votes (44.15%) in 1985.
