= Badruddin Khan =

Indian cricketer (born 1968)

Personal information
- Full name: Badruddin Iqbal Khan
- Born: 4 June 1968 (age 58); Bombay, Maharashtra, India
- Source: ESPNcricinfo, 17 March 2020

Badruddin Khan (born 4 June 1968) is an Indian cricketer. He played in 37 first-class and 18 List A matches for Assam and Mumbai between 1986 and 1999. In February 2020, he was named in India's squad for the Over-50s Cricket World Cup in South Africa. However, the tournament was cancelled during the third round of matches due to the COVID-19 pandemic.
