= Bahuara, Dildarnagar =

Bahuara, Dildarnagar Bahuara Naseerpur
- village
- Location of Bahuara in Uttar Pradesh
- Coordinates: 25.4416279°N 83.6702104°E
- Country: India
- State: Uttar Pradesh
- District: Ghazipur
- Established: 1610; 416 years ago
- Founder: Zamindar Naseer khan

Government
  - Type: Pradhan
  - Body: Gram Panchayat

Area
  - Total: 256.95 ha (634.9 acres)
  - Land: 254.304 ha (628.40 acres)
  - Water: 2.646 ha (6.54 acres)

Population (2011)
  - Total: 4,060
  - Density: 1,600/km^{2} (4,130/sq mi)

Languages
  - Official: Hindi, Urdu & Bhojpuri
- Time zone: UTC+5:30 (IST)
- Postal code: 232326
- Website: up.gov.in

Bahuara is a village in Kamsaar in the Indian state of Uttar Pradesh. Bahuara is a village with a population of almost 5000. It is surrounded by others Kamsar villages. Bahuara is well connected with the town of Dildarnagar which is hardly 2-3 kilometres away from the village. People of Bahuara are scattered throughout the world. Ancestrally, the people of bahuara have been a land-owning (Zamindar) community divided into two colonies Westside & Eastside. Neighbouring villages are Rakhsaha, Dildarnagar, and others.

== History ==
Image of the Eid gah build by Zamindar Naseer Khan in year 1600.

Bahuwara village was founded by Zamindar Naseer khan in 1590 AD, who was a grand son of Narhar khan founder of Dildarnagar kamsar. Naseer Khan had two sons who established West side and East Side in the village. Later their family established some hamlets and Muhallahs in and near the village. When Naseer Khan established the village he also build a Eid Gah in the village in 1600. Later his descendants made one more Eid Gah in the village known as Qasmi Eid gah. Know the Eid Gah made by Zamindar Naseer Khan is known as Purana Eid Gah.

== Agriculture ==
Image of a farm in Bahuwara.

In terms of agriculture, Bahuara stands on a good position. The soil of the village is full of minerals. Most of the families in the village belong to zamindar community. People are doing farming in the village for more than three hundred years and are very much skild. The total area of that village is 634.94 acres out of which nearly 600 acres of land is crop production area of the village. Crops which grow in Gazipur district are grown in the village. The village machinery like tractors and combine harvesters are used for farming. Mostly mustard, wheat, rice farming is done in the village. Rice is one of the main crops in the region. Rice farming is done two times in a year, if the rainfall is good then it is done three times.

== Historical population ==
Population Growth of Bahuara
Year	Pop.	±%
1861	2,399	—
1871	2,538	+5.8%
1881	2,768	+9.1%
1891	2,945	+6.4%
1901	3,140	+6.6%
1911	3,355	+6.8%
1921	3,589	+7.0%
1931	3,848	+7.2%
1941	4,134	+7.4%
1951	4,160	+0.6%
1961	4,056	−2.5%
1971	4,040	−0.4%
1981	4,020	−0.5%
1991	4,000	−0.5%
2001	3,800	−5.0%
2011	4,060	+6.8%
Source:Census of India
