= Kusi, Dildarnagar =

Kusi Mustafabad
- village
- Aerial view of the village Kusi, winter 2015
- Nickname: Cleanest village of Ghazipur
- Location in Uttar Pradesh, India
- Coordinates: 25°24′33″N 83°38′05″E
- Country: India
- State: Uttar Pradesh
- District: Ghazipur
- Established: 1610; 416 years ago
- Founder: Zamindar Azam Khan

Government
  - Body: Gram Panchayat

Area
  - Total: 436.91 ha (1,079.6 acres)
  - Land: 428.822 ha (1,059.64 acres)
  - Water: 8.088 ha (19.99 acres)

Population (2011)
  - Total: 5,710
  - Density: 1,330/km^{2} (3,450/sq mi)
- Demonym: Kamsari

Local language Bhojpuri
  - Official: Hindi Urdu
- Time zone: UTC+5:30 (IST)
- Vehicle registration: UP
- Website: up.gov.in

Kusi (previously known as Mustafabad) is a village of Kamsaar in Ghazipur district in the Indian state of Uttar Pradesh. The village has also Jama masjid Kusi. The nearest railway station is Dildar nagar. As of 2011 census the main population of the village lived in an area of 62 acres and had 796 households. The family of Kusi were one of the largest zamindars of Ghazipur and their zamindari was known as Kusi Kusi zamindari it became a Zamindari chieftaincy in year 1858 which was ruled by the family of Kusi and Bhaksi, it had 15 villages with an area of 94 km² in year 1901.

== Historical population ==
Population Growth of Kusi
Year	Pop.	±%
1861	2,550	—
1871	2,863	+12.3%
1881	3,024	+5.6%
1891	3,156	+4.4%
1901	3,205	+1.6%
1911	3,280	+2.3%
1921	3,300	+0.6%
1931	3,525	+6.8%
1941	3,650	+3.5%
1951	3,200	−12.3%
1961	2,980	−6.9%
1971	3,378	+13.4%
1981	3,905	+15.6%
1991	4,966	+27.2%
2001	5,463	+10.0%
2011	5,710	+4.5%
Source:Census of India
