= Karmahari, Ghazipur =

Karmahari Qasimpur
- Village
- Location in Uttar Pradesh, India
- Coordinates: 25.350°N 83.642°E
- Country: India
- State: Uttar Pradesh
- District: Ghazipur
- Established: 1606 (by Shahab chaudhary); 1780 (by some other families)
- Founder: Zamindar Shahab Chaudhary

Government
  - Type: Panchayati Raj (India)
  - Body: X Gram Pradhan Shahab Chaudhary

Area
  - Total: 472.34 ha (1,167.2 acres)
- Elevation: 70 m (230 ft)

Population (2020)
  - Total: 5,544
  - Density: 1,174/km^{2} (3,040/sq mi)

Languages
  - Official: Bhojpuri, Hindi, Urdu
- Time zone: UTC+5:30 (IST)
- PIN: 232326
- Telephone code: 05497
- Vehicle registration: UP 61

Karmahari (also known as Qasimpur) is a village in Zamania Tehsil's Ghazipur district, Uttar Pradesh, India. Zamindar Shahab Chaudhary established it in 1606. In 1763, most of Badhu Chaudhary family relocated to Chaudhary and almost emptied the village. The family of Shahab Chaudhary had 1542 Hectares of ancestral land, which they gave to other people and established Baraura, Karmahari, and Nonar village when they relocated to Daltonsganj. Later, some of his friends and family also relocated to Daltonsganj. The village is a part of Dewaitha Gram Panchayat.

== Demographics ==
Population Growth of Karmahari
Year	Pop.	±%
1861	533	—
1871	597	+12.0%
1881	657	+10.1%
1891	736	+12.0%
1901	809	+9.9%
1911	890	+10.0%
1921	970	+9.0%
1931	1,020	+5.2%
1941	1,009	−1.1%
1951	1,110	+10.0%
1961	2,665	+140.1%
1971	2,980	+11.8%
1981	3,576	+20.0%
1991	3,933	+10.0%
2001	4,230	+7.6%
2011	4,535	+7.2%
Source:Census of India
