= Mahend =

Mahend Nasrabad
- Village
- Interactive map of Mahend
- Country: India
- State: Uttar Pradesh
- District: Ghazipur
- Established: 1526

Government
  - Type: Sarpanch
  - Body: Gram panchayat

Area
  - Total: 691.14 ha (1,707.8 acres)

Population (2011)
  - Total: 9,878
  - Density: 1,429/km^{2} (3,702/sq mi)
- Time zone: UTC+5:30 (IST)
- Postal code: 233228

Mahend (also known as Nasrabad) is a village of in Mohammdabad of Ghazipur in the Indian state of Uttar Pradesh.
