= Akhini, Kaimur =

Akhini Tajpur Akhini
- village
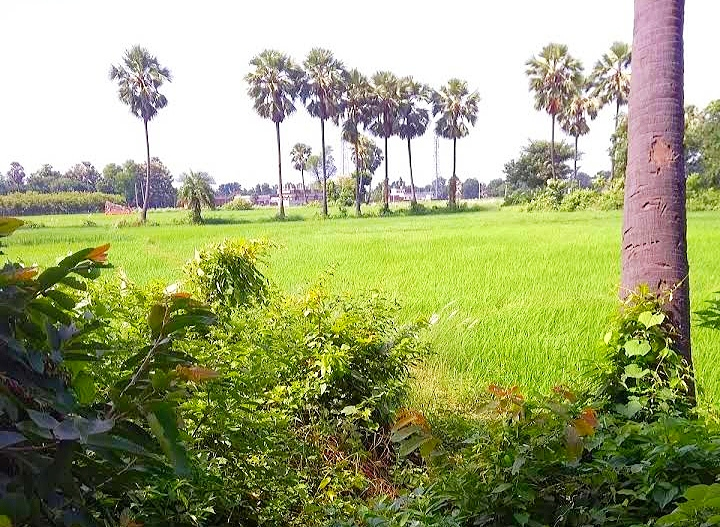
- Farms of Akhini village
- Interactive map of Akhini
- Coordinates: 25.38°N 83.70°E
- Country: India
- State: Bihar
- District: Kaimur
- Established: 1600; 426 years ago

Area
  - Total: 418 ha (1,030 acres)

Population (2011)
  - Total: 3,950
  - Density: 945/km^{2} (2,450/sq mi)

Languages
  - Official: Hindi
- Time zone: UTC+5:30 (IST)
- Postal code: 802132 area_code_type = Telephone code
- Area code: 6187
- ISO 3166 code: IN-BR

Akhini, on the banks of the Karmanasa River, is a village in the Kaimur district of Bihar. It shares border with Ghazipur district of UttarPradesh. As of 2011 census the population of this village is 4,954. Historical records suggest that these of Kaimur were initially settled by indigenous groups such as the Bhars, Cheros, and Savars during prehistoric and early historic periods, with an agrarian lifestyle centered on the fertile lands.

== Agriculture and Plantation ==
According to the 2011 census, the village spans 418 hectares, with 362.4 hectares under net sown area, primarily irrigated by wells and tube-wells covering 323.6 hectares now canals too. The main crops cultivated include rice, wheat, and pulses such as lentils and chickpeas, with rice being the dominant kharif crop due to the region's suitability for paddy cultivation. Kaimur district is also called as Rice bowl of Bihar.

== Literacy and Education ==
According to the 2011 Census of India, Akhini village records an overall literacy rate of 74.34%, with male literacy at 82.69% and female literacy at 64.39%. There is an improvement as compared to the 2001 census, reflecting efforts to enhance educational access in rural Bihar. The village supports basic education through one pre-primary school, one primary school, and one middle school. Secondary and senior secondary schools are available within 5-10 km like Jaiswal High School, Nuaon, GB College, Ramgarh.

== Festivals and traditions ==
In Akhini, major festivals such as Diwali and Holi are celebrated with enthusiasm, reflecting the broader cultural practices of the region. Holi, typically in March, features vibrant colors and folk music on instruments like the dholak across the village. Kali mandir, Brahma devta, Brahma Chaura, Roza are the shrine places. At Saint Jahangir Dargah many people come to visit especially on Thursday.

== Historical population ==
Population Growth of Akhini
Year	Pop.	±%
1861	1,890	—
1871	2,079	+10.0%
1881	2,286	+10.0%
1891	2,515	+10.0%
1901	2,780	+10.5%
1911	3,045	+9.5%
1921	3,348	+10.0%
1931	3,684	+10.0%
1941	4,052	+10.0%
1951	4,050	−0.0%
1961	4,080	+0.7%
1971	4,488	+10.0%
1981	3,816	−15.0%
1991	3,805	−0.3%
2001	3,900	+2.5%
2011	3,950	+1.3%
Source:Census of India
