= Rakasaha =

Rakasaha Rakasahan Sharif
- Village
- Rakasahan
- Location of Rakasaha in Uttar Pradesh
- Coordinates: 25.4444496°N 83.6873446°E
- Country: India
- State: Uttar Pradesh
- District: Ghazipur
- Established: 1585; 441 years ago
- Founder: Zamindar Aquif Khan

Government
  - Type: Gram Pradhan
  - Body: Gram Panchayat

Area
  - Total: 1,893.88 ha (4,679.9 acres)
  - Land: 1,879.766 ha (4,645.00 acres)
  - Water: 14.114 ha (34.88 acres)

Population (2011)
  - Total: 11,125
  - Density: 591.83/km^{2} (1,532.8/sq mi)

Languages: Hindi, Urdu, English, Bhojpuri
  - Official: Hindi
- Time zone: UTC+5:30 (IST)
- Website: up.gov.in

Rakasaha is a village in Kamsaar in the Indian state of Uttar Pradesh. Almost 6500 Kamsaar Pathans (NAWABS) lived in the village as of 2011.

== History ==
Rakasaha was established by Mubarak Khan in the late 1500s. Zamindar Mubarak Khan was a Grandson of Narhar Khan, founder of Dildarnagar Kamsar.

The founders were Zamindars (landholders) who held administrative and social power during the late Mughal period. While specific medieval records of Raksaha itself are limited, the broader Ghazipur region was a significant territory during the Sultanate and Mughal eras. Ghazipur’s recorded history goes back to dense ancient forests, ashrams, and early settlements mentioned in regional lore and early travel accounts.

During British colonial rule, rural land administrations and Zamindari Systems influenced Raksaha’s Land Ownership and social structures. The village, like many in Ghazipur, continued as an agrarian society.

After Indian independence in 1947, the zamindari system was gradually abolished, and governance shifted to democratic Panchayati Raj institutions (village councils). The Gram Pradhan (village head) now administers local governance.

== Transport ==
Regular transport facilities connect Raksaha to nearby towns like Dildarnagar, which is about 3 km away and serves as the nearest hub for economic activities.

== Demographics ==
Total population (2011): 11,125 people in around 1,387 families.

Sex Ratio: 897 females per 1,000 males.

Literacy Rate: Higher than the state average — around 77.46%. Male literacy is about 87.69%, and female literacy is about 65.93%.

Children (0–6 years): Around 1,834 children, which is approximately 16% of the total population.

Population Growth of Raksaha
Year	Pop.	±%
1861	4,816	—
1871	5,200	+8.0%
1881	5,617	+8.0%
1891	6,078	+8.2%
1901	6,580	+8.3%
1911	7,142	+8.5%
1921	7,756	+8.6%
1931	8,431	+8.7%
1941	8,675	+2.9%
1951	8,170	−5.8%
1961	8,150	−0.2%
1971	8,970	+10.1%
1981	9,865	+10.0%
1991	10,852	+10.0%
2001	11,050	+1.8%
2011	11,125	+0.7%
Source:Census of India
