= Chitarkoni =

Chitarkoni Saleempur
- Village
- Saraila Chitarkoni
- A farm in Chitarkoni

- Location in Uttar Pradesh, India
- Coordinates: 25.3678449°N 83.6763355°E
- Country: India
- State: Uttar Pradesh
- District: Ghazipur
- Established: 1640; 386 years ago
- Founder: Zamindar Saleem khan

Government
  - Body: Gram panchayat

Area
  - Total: 701.46 ha (1,733.3 acres)
  - Land: 692.684 ha (1,711.66 acres)
  - Water: 8.776 ha (21.69 acres)

Population (2011)
  - Total: 2,377
  - Density: 343.2/km^{2} (888.8/sq mi)

Languages
  - Official: Hindi
- Time zone: UTC+5:30 (IST)
- Vehicle registration: UP
- Website: up.gov.in

Chitarkoni is a village in Kamsaar in the Indian state of Uttar Pradesh.

== History ==
Image of Jama Masjid of Chitarkoni build in year 1641.

Chitarkoni was founded by Zamindar Saleem Khan in middle 1640AD, a great-grandson of Narhar Khan, founder of Kamsar. When zamindar Saleem Khan established Chtarkoni he build a mosque in Chitarkoni name as Chitarkoni Jama Masjid. Chitarkoni Jama Masjid when made had silver on the walls. The lines of Quran was pasted on the walls of the mosque which was made up of silver. The Mosque still has silver on the wall. During 1857 most of the Silver was taken by the Britsihshers. Later some was taken by thieves but after the independence the Indian government allotted some security near the Mosque and handed the mosque to the family of Chitarkoni village. The Jama Masjid of Chitarkoni was renovated in 1960s by the villagers. It is also said that the Jama Masjid of Chtarkoni is the largest mosque in terms of area in Kamsar-o-Bar region of Ghazipur. When Masjid was made in 1641 its minarets were 45 foot High which was the second tallest in Kamsar. There are many Muhallahs in the village but the main are said As. Purabh Muhalla, and Pachim Muahallah. As of 2011 census, the main population of the village lived in an area of 37.5 acres and had 644 house holds.

Population Growth of Dildarnagar Kamsar
Year	Pop.	±%
1861	802	—
1871	885	+10.3%
1881	972	+9.8%
1891	1,069	+10.0%
1901	1,176	+10.0%
1911	1,293	+9.9%
1921	1,422	+10.0%
1931	1,565	+10.1%
1941	1,722	+10.0%
1951	1,808	+5.0%
1961	1,800	−0.4%
1971	1,980	+10.0%
1981	2,178	+10.0%
1991	2,395	+10.0%
2001	2,200	−8.1%
2011	2,377	+8.0%
Source:Census of India
