= Fufuao =

Fufuao Firozpur
- village
- Rampur Phuphuaon
- Interactive map of Fufuao
- Coordinates: 25°22′33″N 83°36′32″E
- Country: India
- State: Uttar Pradesh
- District: Ghazipur
- Established: 1640; 386 years ago
- Founder: Zamindar Firoz Khan

Government
  - Body: Gram panchayat

Area
  - Total: 443 ha (1,090 acres)
  - Land: 433.894 ha (1,072.18 acres)
  - Water: 9.106 ha (22.50 acres)

Population (2011)
  - Total: 3,095
  - Density: 713.3/km^{2} (1,847/sq mi)

Language
  - Official: Hindi
  - Additional official: Urdu
- Time zone: UTC+5:30 (IST)
- Vehicle registration: UP
- Website: up.gov.in

Fufuao or Rampur Phuphuaon is a village in Dildarnagar Kamsar in the Indian state of Uttar Pradesh.

== History ==
The village was established by Zamindar Firoz Khan in 1640, who was a grandson of Sarkar diwan Raja Quttul Khan Zamindar Jagirdar Taluka Sawerai and great-grandson of Narhar Khan founder of Dildarnagar Kamsar. The village is also known as Rampur because when Firoz Khan build his house many Hindu families came and build their houses and named three colonies as Rampur. After a couple of centuries population increased and both the village Fufuaon and Rampur started looking same and Rampur was made a part of Fufuaon village.

== Demographics ==
As of 2011 Indian Census, Fufuao had a total population of 3,095, of which 1,574 were males and 1,521 were females. Population within the age group of 0 to 6 years was 507. The total number of literates in Fufuao was 1,998, which constituted 64.6% of the population with male literacy of 72.6% and female literacy of 56.3%. The effective literacy rate of 7+ population of Fufuao was 77.2%, of which male literacy rate was 87.9% and female literacy rate was 66.4%. The Scheduled Castes and Scheduled Tribes population was 797 and 6 respectively. Fufuao had 452 households in 2011. The main population of the village lived in an area of more than 60 acres.

Population Growth of Fufuaon
Year	Pop.	±%
1861	972	—
1871	1,000	+2.9%
1881	1,020	+2.0%
1891	1,070	+4.9%
1901	1,150	+7.5%
1911	1,265	+10.0%
1921	1,392	+10.0%
1931	1,532	+10.1%
1941	1,715	+11.9%
1951	1,700	−0.9%
1961	1,545	−9.1%
1971	2,318	+50.0%
1981	2,596	+12.0%
1991	2,865	+10.4%
2001	2,900	+1.2%
2011	3,095	+6.7%
Source:Census of India
