= Seorai =

Seorai Kamsar jagir seorai
- Subdistrict
- Sewrai
- Nickname: Kamsar Jagir Seorai
- Location in Uttar Pradesh, India
- Country: India
- State: Uttar Pradesh
- District: Ghazipur
- First established: 1600
- Second established: 1790
- Founder: Diwan kuttul khan kamsar SEORAI
- Named for: Sevrai

Government
  - Type: Gram Pradhan
  - Body: Gram Panchaayat

Area
  - Total: 1,082.83 ha (2,675.7 acres)

Population (2011)
  - Total: 20,530 (Town); 12,550(village)
- Demonym: Seorai Chaurasi Sikarwar

Bhojpuri
  - Hindi: Hindi English Bhojpuri
- Time zone: UTC+5:30 (IST)
- PIN: 232333
- Vehicle registration: UP-61

Seorai is a village of Chaurasi Sikarwar, and Kamsar Pathan also serve as the headquarters of Seorai in mugahl era of Kamsar jagir under Diwan Kuttul khan and modern era as Seorai Tahsil in region of Ghazipur District of Uttar Pradesh, India. The Seorai tehsil was made a tehsil of the Ghazipur District in year 2016. It consists of 142 villages and one town. Seorai main village has a total area of 878.02 hectares (2,169.6 acres) and a population of 20000 but its total area is 1,082.83 hectares (2,675.7 acres) and a population of 20,530 which also includes Bhadaura. Seorai tehsil has the total area of 366.62 km^{2} (141.55 sq mi).

== History ==
Once a village of the historic Jamnia Pargana, Sevrai is now a tehsil with rich historical, geographical, and political significance. It is the birthplace of Shri Omprakash Singh—former MP, ex-minister in the Uttar Pradesh government, and current MLA from Ghazipur.

Sevrai's origins trace back to Shubhasain Dev Rao, one of the six sons of Sainumal Rao, as documented in Evolution and Spatial Organization of Clan Settlement. His descendants—Nihal Rao, Maniyar Rao, and Bakhtaur Rao—expanded their influence across Dharkandha, Sarna, Nauwa, and Itadhi. Even today, their legacy remains visible in the temples and forts of these regions.

Revolted by this tyranny, Nihal Rao, a Sikarwar Rajput, led a rebellion with support from Dheer Singh's queen and Mandev Rai of Revatipur. The decisive battle took place near Giddha pond in Sevrai, ending with the death of Kutulu Khan.

Later, Ummed Rao, a descendant of Sevrai, was betrayed and killed during an arms-worship ceremony in Kasera. Since then, the people of Sevrai have upheld a tradition of not drinking Kasera's water—a living symbol of historical memory and honor.

Today, Sevrai comprises three pattis, inhabited by the descendants of Nihal Rao, Maniyar Rao, and Bakhtaur Rao. Families also reside in nearby villages like Sarna, Nauwa, Mathila, Khudra, and Itadhi. The legacy of Sevrai continues to inspire pride, valor, and deep-rooted cultural identity among its people.

Sevrai has many ponds dug by Kutulu Khan because he used to rule tyrannically by staying safe between the ponds and stepwells.

The place was of Kamsaar estate, actually Kamsar jagir already existed during the time of Narhar Khan founder of Kamsar and revenue was paid to Sur empire. But later during Mughals it was reestablished by Raja Quttul Khan a jagirdar of the pargana and Sarkar, and the divan of the subah. He built a fort here in the early 1600s and dug a canal around it for security during the time of the later years of Akbar's rule. Still some parts of the canal can be seen around the village.

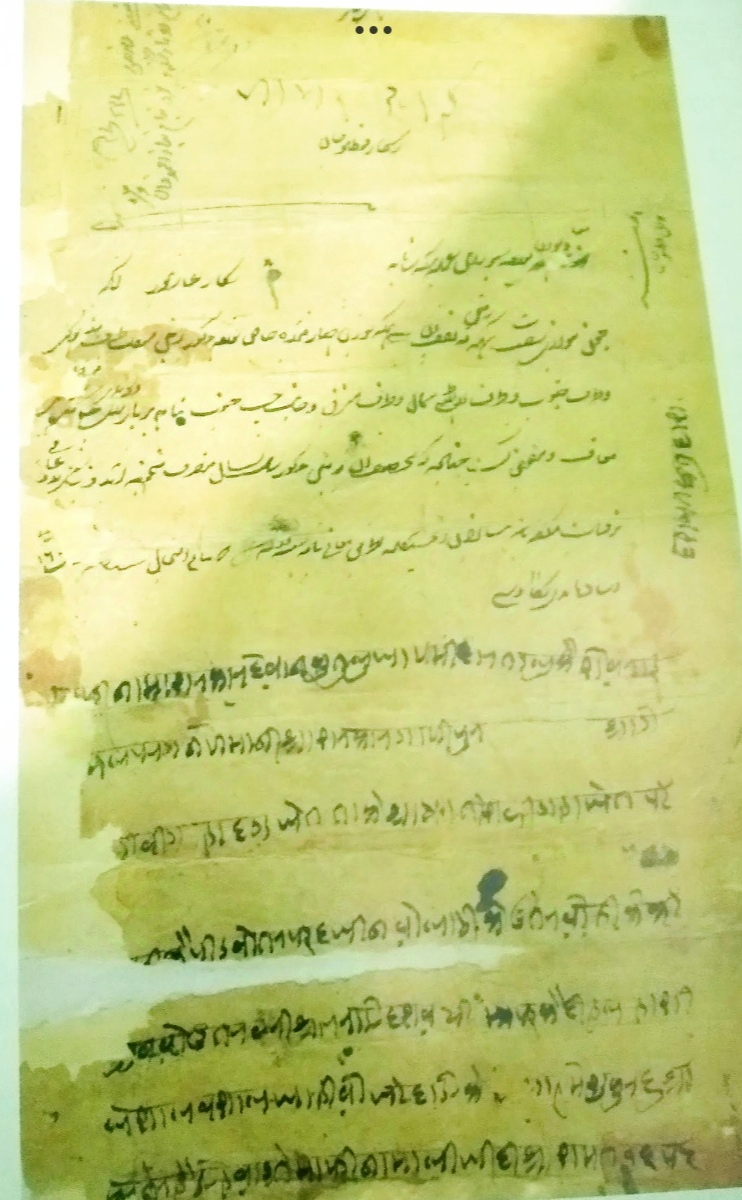
The letter in farsi, of Mughal era, written by Raja Kuttul Khan to Man singh Rai of Reotipur, in 1601 AD, somedays before his murder.

During his time, Kamsaar jagir's main administrative centre was Seorai, and Kuttul Khan was its governor. Kamsaar jagir was spread over 52 nearby villages granted by Akbar. He also built a fort, a Mosque, and Eidgah in the village of Seorai. Although he was killed in a dispute by Man Singh Rai of Reotipur, then his cousin Daud Khan of Dewaitha, took revenge of his death and succeeded him. During the 1860s, a large number of people belonging to Kushwaha families settled in the village. The name Seorai was kept because there was also a large population of Sevri families who had settled here during the time of Babur. After the death of Quttul Khan, one of his grandsons named Zamindar Fulan Khan settled here with his family in the year 1630.

While Seorai was established as a taluka of Kamsaar, Reotipur, Sherpur region, which were large villages, among the 52 villages taluka, The Sakarwars of Seorai, settled here from the family of Shubhsen Rao, who was a great-grandson of Raja Dham Dev Rao of Gahmar. Whereas the Kamsaries were from Fulan Khan, a grandson of Quttul Khan.

Fulan Khan's family lived here for many years. However, the population of the Zamindar Fulan Khan family decreased, and most of them migrated to Gorasara & Mania Seorai, located in the Zamania pargana of Ghazipur, witnessed a tragic historical event during the reign of Mughal Emperor Shah Alam I. On 16th Muharram (Tuesday, 1710-11), Kunwar Dheer Singh (Muhammad Bahrmand Khan), the faujdar of Chainpur and the son of zamindar Muhammad Deendar Khan of Dildarnagar, was martyred while defending the region against a rebellious former faujdar of Chausa. The attack was orchestrated due to animosity from Moatsim Khan, the faujdar of Ghazipur.

The rebels looted villages like Seorai, Bareji, Gorasara, and Maniya, destroying property and desecrating Seorai's old mosque. Bahrmand Khan and his companions, including Sheikh Dayanatullah, Muhammad Hamza, and Muhammad Sultan, sacrificed their lives to protect the region.

The event deeply grieved Muhammad Dindar Khan, who documented the incident in a Persian "Mahzarnama" addressed to the emperor. Today, the Deendar Shamsi Museum and Library preserves this document, along with the legacy of Bahrmand Khan's bravery, as reflected in the five graves at Seorai's Kuttul Khan Mosque.
