= Mania, Dildarnagar =

Mania Khizirpur
- Village
- Location in Uttar Pradesh, India Mania (India)
- Coordinates: 25°27′23″N 83°46′42″E
- Country: India
- State: Uttar Pradesh
- District: Ghazipur
- Established: 1590; 436 years ago
- Founder: Zamindar Khizir Khan

Government
  - Body: Gram panchayat

Area
  - Total: 428.68 ha (1,059.3 acres)

Population (2011)
  - Total: 5,736
  - Density: 1,338/km^{2} (3,466/sq mi)
- Demonym: Kamsari

Language
  - Urdu, bhojpuri, hindi, english: Hindi
- Time zone: UTC+5:30 (IST)
- Pin code: 232333
- Vehicle registration: Mania
- Website: up.gov.in

Mania is a village in Kamsaar in the Indian state of Uttar Pradesh. It is located in Seorai Tehsil in the Ghazipur district. It is situated 22 km (14 mi) from the sub-district headquarters Seorai ( 4km ) and from the district headquarters Ghazipur. Its total area is 428.68 hectares (1,059.3 acres) and a total population of 5736. Mania village was established in the early 1590 a.d. by Khizir Khan, who was a grandson of Narhar Khan.

Mania's Old and famous house name is lal koth(lal ghar) near jama masjid.

== History ==
The Mania village was established by Khizir Khan who was a grandson of Raja Narhar Khan, the founder of Kamsar. Khizir Khan was the eldest son of Bahbal Khan and a grand son of Narhar Khan. His father when Distributed the land he got land near Gahmar on which he established Mania in year in later 1500s.

== Agriculture ==
Mania has a strong agricultural industry. The village has a total area of 1,412 acres (571 hectares) acres of which the total crop production area of the village is 1,380 acres (560 hectares). Nearly all kinds of crops grown in Uttar Pradesh and western Bihar are grown in the village. The village has all the necessary machinery for farming activity, including 30,000 tractors, 5,000 combine harvesters and many more machines. The soil of the village is good for crop production. Fish farming, cattle rearing, poultry farming, fertilizer and pesticide production are undertaken in the village. The village also has two brick kilns and one rice mill. The village also has solar panels and solar tube wells. The water level of the village is not more than 100 feet deep and the village also has many ponds and trees.

== Demographics ==
The village is home to 5000 people; among them 53% are male and 47% are female. 88% of the population is from general caste; 12% are from schedule caste. The child (aged under 6 years) population of Mania village is 20%; among them 56% are boys and 44% are girls. There are 317 households in the village and an average of 5 persons live in every family. As of 2011 census the main population of the village lives in an area of 82.8 acres and had 717 households.

=== Historical population ===
Population Growth of Mania
Year	Pop.	±%
1861	2,400	—
1871	2,530	+5.4%
1881	2,694	+6.5%
1891	2,864	+6.3%
1901	3,050	+6.5%
1911	3,357	+10.1%
1921	3,590	+6.9%
1931	3,852	+7.3%
1941	4,137	+7.4%
1951	4,200	+1.5%
1961	4,198	−0.0%
1971	4,451	+6.0%
1981	4,796	+7.8%
1991	5,175	+7.9%
2001	5,593	+8.1%
2011	5,713	+2.1%
Source:Census of India

=== Literacy ===
A total of 1002 people in the village are literate, among them 639 male and 363 female. The literacy rate (children under 6 are excluded) of Mania is 55%. 65% of the male population and 43% of the female population is literate here. The overall literacy rate in the village has increased by 26%. Male literacy has gone up by 25% and female literacy rate has gone up by 26%.

=== Workers profile ===
Mania has 37% (836) of its population engaged in either full-time or part-time work. 46% of the male and 26% of the female population are employed. 24% of the total male population is employed full-time and 22% are employed part-time. For women, 5% of the total female population are in full-time work and 21% are in part-time work.

== Plantation ==
When Mania was established by Zamindar Khizir Khan, his sons established an orchard named Hazara Bagh. The orchard was spread over a large area and had more than 10,000 trees. Many of Khizir Khan's descendants have built farms in the area, causing the orchard to be small and scattered.
