= Zamania =

Town in Uttar Pradesh, India

Zamania Madan Banaras
- Town
- Location in Uttar Pradesh, India
- Coordinates: 25°25′10″N 83°33′25″E
- Country: India
- State: Uttar Pradesh
- District: Ghazipur
- Established: 1560; 461 years ago
- Founder: Ali Quli Khan Zaman

Area
  - Total: 936 ha (2,310 acres)
- Elevation: 56 m (184 ft)

Population
  - Total: 33,253
  - Density: 3,550/km^{2} (9,200/sq mi)

Languages
  - Official: Hindi, Bhojpuri, English, Urdu
- Time zone: IST
- PIN: 232329
- Vehicle registration: UP-61
- Website: https://ghazipur.nic.in/public-utility/nagar-palika-parishad-zamania/

Zamania is a town in the Indian state of Uttar Pradesh. Its municipal council is subordinate to the Ghazipur District. It is also the administrative head of Zamania tehsil. It is also a very historical town, it derives its name from Ali Quli Khan Zaman, who was also known as Khan Zaman or Zaman Khan, he was a governor of Jaunpur, and Ghazipur during the time of Akbar.

== History ==
=== Early Hindu mythology ===
According to Hindu mythology, Zamania was the place where Rishi Jamadagni (father of Lord Parashurama) had his ashrama. Jamadagni Ashram was located near the banks of the Ganges, a few miles from the town of Zamania, where a tributary of the Ganges joins the river after covering parts of Gang Barar.

=== The establishment of the town ===
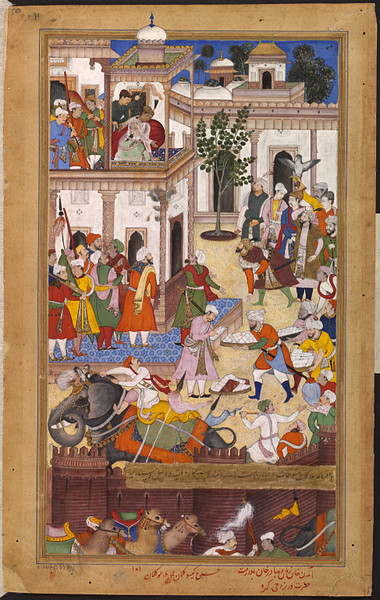
A painting of Ali Quli Khan and Bahadur Khan made in 1561, from Akbarnama

During the reign of Akbar the Afghan Pathan, Ali Quli Khan Zaman alias Khan Zaman took command of Ghazipur and founded Zamania. Ali Quli Khan's decedents later established Nasratpur and Sarai Murad Ali villages near Zamania. In 1750s the importance of the town was removed by Nawab Fazl Ali Khan, a Nawab of Ghazipur, but later, a notable zamindar of Zamania, Chaudhari Muhammad Azmal reestablished its importance and redeveloped the town. Chaudhary Azmal, was an Amil of the Pargana in 1770-1790 taluka to Zamania, with a zamindari holding of 11,767 acres, many of the villages in the tehsil still hold his name. Although during Mughal era much of the places in current day tehsil of a part of Diladarnagar Kamsar, home of Kamsari pathans who had a strong hold over this area, with its administrative head being at Sewrai, but when the town of Zamania was made a subdistrict many of the places in Diladarnagar Kamsar was added in here. Although, later Sewrai was again made a tehsil. After the attack of Warren Hastings, the then Governor-General of the British, this area was ruled over by other British rulers. Lord Cornwallis, who was known for land reforms, came to visit here, and died of fever on October 5, 1805. A tomb built in his memory is a tourist attraction in Ghazipur City.

This area gave birth to freedom fighters. The hero of the first Freedom Movement (popularly referred to as Sepoy Mutiny) Mangal Pandey was born here. The Nilha Sahib Revolt, where the farmers revolted against the British and set fire to various Indigo godowns, took place here. Ghazipur has played a major role in India's struggle for freedom. The Sepoy Mutiny in 1857 was a violent uprising against British rule over India. The British did eventually put down the uprising, but not without tarnishing their reputation by using offensive techniques against the mutineers. The people here also took great part in the revolt of 1857 led by Kunwar Singh of Jagdishpur.

== Demographics ==
As per the 2011 Census, Zamania had a population of 33,423, with males comprising 52.1% and females 47.89%. The town recorded an average literacy rate of 64.56%, which is slightly above the national average of 59.5%. Male literacy stood at 72%, while female literacy was 56.46%. Additionally, 15.72% of Zamania’s population was under the age of six.

== Tehsil ==
Zamania Tehsil is a Tehsil in the Ghazipur District of Uttar Pradesh. According to Census information in 2011, the sub-district code of Zamania Tehsil is 00991. There are about 383 villages in the Zamania Tehsil.

== See also ==
- Arangi, Gazipur, Uttar Pradesh
- Mednipur, Gazipur
- Zamania Canal
- Dildarnagar Kamsar
- Seorai, Ghazipur
