= List of villages in Araria district =

Araria District is one of the thirty-eight districts of Bihar state, India, and has the following villages:

== A-G ==
- Ahmadpur
- Ahmadpur Pahi
- Ajhwa
- Ajitnagar
- Akarthappa
- Amauna
- Amgachhi, Araria
- Amgachhi Milik Arazi
- Amhara
- Amrori
- Anchraand Hanuman nagar
- Arraha
- Arraha Madarganj
- Artia
- Asabhag
- Asura Kalan Khola
- Asuri
- Aulabari
- Aurahi
- Azamnagar
- Azmatpur
- Bagdahara
- Bagesari
- Baghmara
- Baghua
- Baghua Dibiganj
- Bagmara
- Bagnagar
- Bagulaha
- Baharbari
- Bahgi
- Baija Patti
- Baija Patti
- Baijnathpur
- Baijnathpur
- Baijnathpur
- Baiju Patti Milik
- Bairgachhi
- Bairgachhi
- Bairgachhi
- Bakainia
- Bakhri Milik
- Bakhri Milik
- Balchanda
- Balua
- Balua
- Balua
- Banbhag
- Bangawan
- Bangawan
- Bankora
- Banmali
- Bansbari
- Bara
- Bara Istamrar
- Baradbata
- Barahmasia
- Barahmasia Istamrar
- Barahmasia Ranikatta
- Barahmasia Simalbani
- Baraili
- Barakamatchistipur
- Barantpur
- Barbana
- Bardaha
- Bardaha
- Bardenga
- Bargaon
- Barhara
- Barhara
- Barhepara
- Barhepara
- Barhmotar Chakla
- Barhuwa
- Bariarpur Urf Bazidpur
- Barkumba
- Barmotara
- Barmotara Hingua
- Barmotra Arazi
- Basaithi
- Basaithi Math
- Basantpur
- Basgara
- Basgara
- Basmatiya
- Bathnaha
- Batraha
- Baturbari
- Bausi bazar
- Bazidpur
- Behari
- Bela
- Belai
- Belbari
- Belbari
- Belbari
- Belbari
- Belgachhi
- Belsandi
- Belsara
- Belsari
- Belwa
- Benga
- Beni
- Bhadauna
- Bhadesar
- Bhadwar
- Bhag Parasi
- Bhag Turkaili
- Bhagchaura
- Bhaghal Halia
- Bhagkohilia
- Bhagmohabbat
- Bhagparwaha
- Bhagphasia
- Bhagpuraini
- Bhagsadullah Gachh Kola
- Bhagtira
- Bhagwanpur
- Bhairoganj
- Bhaloa
- Bhanghi
- Bhansia
- Bhantabari
- Bhantabari
- Bhaptia
- Bharaili
- Bhargama
- Bhargama
- Bhargama
- Bhargaon
- Bhargaon
- Bhatania
- Bhatauja
- Bhatgaon Chakla
- Bhatiahi
- Bhattaon Kamat
- Bhatwara
- Bhawani Nagar Bausi
- Bhawanipur
- Bhikha
- Bhima
- Bhimpur Khar
- Bhirbhiri
- Bhishunpur
- Bhorha
- Bhorha
- Bhorhar
- Bhujwdupie
- Bhuna
- Bhuna Majgawan
- Binodpur
- Binodpur
- Birban
- Birnagar
- Birnagar Milik
- Bisaria
- Bisaria Patti
- Bishunpr Bhaiaram
- Bishunpur
- Bishunpur
- Bishunpur
- Bistaria
- Bitauna
- Bochi
- Bochi
- Bokantari
- Bokra
- Bualdanti
- Budhi
- Chahatpur
- Chainpur
- Chaita
- Chakai
- Chakorwa
- Chanderdai
- Chandipur. Araria
- Chandni Ghasi
- Chandni Ghasi
- Chandni Ghasi
- Chanrarni
- Charbana
- Chatar
- Chaukta
- Chaura
- Chauri
- Chhapania
- Chhaparia
- Chhatiauna
- Chikania
- Chikni
- Chikni
- Chikni
- Chilhania
- Chirah
- Chiraiya
- Dabhara Jagir
- Dabhra
- Dabhra
- Dahgawan
- Dahipura
- Dahrahra
- Dainia
- Dak
- Dakaita
- Dakaita
- Dala
- Damadighi
- Damiya
- Dargahiganj
- Darha Pipra
- Darhua
- Daria Rai
- Darsana
- Daua
- Daulatpur
- Deghli
- Dehti
- Denga
- Deopura
- Deoria
- Deothal
- Dhakia
- Dhama
- Dhanesri
- Dhanesri
- Dhangawan
- Dhaniain
- Dhanpura
- Dhanpura
- Dhanpura
- Dhantola
- Dharamganj Baghua
- Dharmeshwar Gachh
- Dhengri
- Dhobinia
- Dhobinia
- Dholbaja
- Dhowabari
- Dhurgaon
- Diari
- Dipaul
- Dipnagar
- Dipnagar
- Dithaura
- Doargawan
- Dogachhi
- Domahana
- Domai
- Domaria
- Dombana
- Doria
- Doria Sonaur and Purandaha
- Duba
- Dumari
- Dumaria
- Dumra
- Durgapur
- Eidgah
- Erischan
- Farasat
- Fatehpur
- Gachh Mahadewa
- Gadaha
- Gadhgawan
- Gaiyari
- Gainrha
- Gamharia
- Gamharia Milik
- Gang Jhali
- Ganj Bhag
- Garha
- Garhara
- Garuha Bishunpur
- Gausnagar
- Gelhabari
- Gerari
- Gerki
- Ghaghri
- Gharakhal
- Ghiwba
- Ghoraghat
- Ghormara
- Ghurna
- Gidhwas
- Girda
- Goarpuchhri
- Gogi
- Gogra
- Gohans
- GokhulPur
- Gopalnagar
- Gopalpur
- Gopipur
- Goshainpur
- Goshainpur
- Gunwanti, Bihar
- Gurmahi
- Gyaspur

== H ==
- Halhalia
- Halhalia jagir
- Hansa
- Hanskosa
- Hanumannagar
- Hardar
- Hardia
- Haria
- Haribhasa
- Haripur
- Harira
- Harpur
- Harpur Kalan
- Harwa
- Hasanpur
- Hasanpur Khurd
- Hasanpura
- Hatgaon
- Hingna
- Hingua Jot
- Hingua Patti
- Hirdepur
- Hyatpur

== I-J ==
- Ikra
- Indarpur
- Itahara
- Itahi
- Jahanpur
- Jahanpur
- Jainagar
- Jamghatti
- Jamua
- Jasodapur
- Jhamta
- Jhirwa Pachhiari
- Jhirwa Purwari
- Jitwarpur
- Jitwarpur
- Jogta
- Jokihat
- Jokihat
- Jokihat
- Jokihat
- Jurail
- pathrabari
- pathrabari

== K ==
- Kabaia
- Kachnahar
- Kadwa
- Kahbara Bishunpur
- Kajleta
- Kajra
- Kakan
- Kakorha
- Kala Balua
- kalahi
- Kamaldaha
- Kamalpur
- Kamalpur
- Kamat Pathraha
- Kamladorha
- Kanhaily
- Kankhudia
- Karahara
- Karahbari
- Karahia
- Karahia
- Karankia
- Karhara Chhaprail
- Kariat
- Karor
- Karor Deghli
- Kasaila Gachh Garha Bhagkasail
- Kashibari
- Kathora
- Katpahar
- Kauakoh
- Kesarra
- Khair Khan
- khaira
- Khajurbari
- Khajuri
- Khajuri Milik
- Khamgara
- Khamkol
- Khapdeh
- Khapra
- Kharhar
- Kharhat
- Kharsahi
- Khawaspur
- Khirdaha
- Khoragachhi
- Khoragachhi
- Khoragachhi Milik
- Khutha Baijnath
- Khuthara Mashragi
- Khuthura Magrabi
- Khuti Kharia
- Khutti
- Kirkichia
- Kishunpur
- Kismat Khawaspur
- Kochgaon
- Kochgawan
- Kolhua
- Kopari
- Korhaili
- koskapur
- Koskapur
- Kotahpur
- Kuan Pokhar
- Kuari
- Kuchaha
- Kuchgaon
- Kujri
- Kulharia Jagir
- Kumaripur
- Kumhra
- Kursail
- Kursakatta
- Kursakatta
- Kursakatta
- Kursakatta
- Kurwa
- Kurwa Lachhmipur
- Kusamaha
- Kusiargaon
- Kusmaul

== L ==
- Lachhmipur
- Lachhmipur Gachh
- Lahna
- Lahsunganj
- Lahtora
- Lalia
- Laruabari
- Latahri
- Lodipur
- Lohtora
- Lokhra
- Lolokhur
- Lutraha Bari

== M ==
- Machhaila
- Madanpur
- Madhail
- Madhepura
- Madhubani
- Madhura
- Mahachanda
- Mahadeokol
- Mahadewa
- Mahalgaon
- Mahasaili Gidhwas
- Mahesh Khunt
- MaheshKhunt Jagir
- Maheshpatti
- Mahisakol
- Mahjaili
- Mahsaili
- Maigara
- Maina, Bihar
- Majgawan
- Majgawan
- Majhua
- Majkuri
- Majlispur
- Majrahi Chakla
- Majrakh
- Mal Parasi
- Malchhari
- Maldoar
- Malharia
- Malhepura
- Manbodhtanda
- Manikpur
- Manikpur Halhalia
- Manullahpatti
- Maratibpur
- Marichgaon
- Marua
- Masuria
- Masuria
- Matiari
- Maya Khori
- Mehadinagar
- Metan
- Meta Letohuj
- Miapur
- Miapur Gachh
- Milik
- Milik Arazi
- Mirdaul
- Mirganj
- Mirzapur
- Mohania
- Mohiuddinpur
- Mohni
- Motiari
- Mundmala
- Muraripur
- Murbala
- Musahari
- Musanda
- Musapur
- Nakta
- Nakta Khurd
- Nananpur
- Naraenpur
- Naranga
- Narhewa Diara
- Narpatganj
- Nathpur
- Naua Nankar
- Nawabganj
- Nawalgang Manpur
- Nawalganj Pitamber
- Newa Lal Chakla
- Nijkulharia
- Nirpur
- Pachera
- Padampur
- Padaria
- Pahara
- Pahara Sikti
- Pahasra
- Paik Para
- Paik Tola
- Paikdara
- Pakri
- Pakri
- Palasbani
- Palasi
- Palasi
- Palasmani
- Pandubi
- Paraia
- Pararia
- Pararia Ranikatta
- Parasi
- Parbata
- Parha
- Parihari
- Parmanpur
- Parsahat
- Parshadpur
- Parshadpur
- Parwaha
- Parwaha
- Parwakhori
- Pategna
- Patehpur Arazi
- Pathrabari
- Pathraha
- Pathraha
- Pechaili
- Pechaili
- Pharhi
- Pharkia
- Phasimagrabi and Phasimashraqi
- Phena
- Phulbari
- Phulbari
- Phulpur Pachhiari
- Phulpur Purwari
- Phulsara
- Pipra
- Pipra
- Pipra
- Pipra Bijwara
- Pipra Pachhiari
- Pirganj
- Pithaura
- Pokharia
- Posdaha
- Pothia
- Pothia
- Pothia
- Potri
- Pranpath Patti
- Purandaha
- Raghopur
- Raghunath Pur
- Raghunathpur
- Rahatmina
- Rahikpur
- Rahikpur Thila Mohan
- Rahua
- Rajaula
- Rajbaili
- Rajganj
- Rajokhar
- Ramai
- Ramganj
- Ramganj
- Ramnagar
- Rampur
- Rampur Kudarkatti
- Rampur Mohanpur
- Rampuradi
- Rangbaha
- Rangdaha
- Rangdaha
- Rani
- Rani Istamrar
- Raniganj
- Raniganj
- Raniganj
- Raniganj
- Rewahi
- Rupail
- Rupauli

== S ==
- Saguna
- Sahabganj
- Sahasmal
- Saida Pokhar
- Saidabad
- Saidpur
- Saifullah Tola
- Sakraili
- Salaigarh
- Samaul
- Samda
- Sandalpur
- Sanjhaili
- Sapa
- Saranpur
- Satbhita
- Satbhita Kamat
- Satghara
- Sawaldeh
- Semaria
- Seyampur
- Shahbazpur
- Shahpur
- Shaifganj
- Shaikhpura
- Shankarpur
- Shankarpur
- Shankarpur
- Shankapur
- Shijhua
- Shoirgaon
- Shyamnagar
- Sikti
- Sikti
- Sikti
- Sikti
- Siktia
- Simarbani
- Simraha
- Singar Mohani
- Singhia
- Sinwari
- Sirsia
- Sirsia Hanumanganj
- Sirsia Kalan
- Sisabari
- Sisauna
- Sisauna
- Siswa
- Sobagmara
- Sohagmara
- Sohandar
- Sohdi
- Soksanand Bhag Khutpur
- Sonakandar
- Sonapur
- Sonapur
- Sukela
- Sukhi
- Sukhirampur
- Sukhsaina
- Sundari
- Surjapur

== T ==
- Tamganj, Bihar
- Tamganj Toufir
- Tamkura
- Tarabari
- Taran
- Tarauna
- Tarbi
- Tera Khurdah
- Tharia Bakia
- Tharua Patti
- Thengapur Pipra Milik Arazi
- Thengpur Pipra
- Tirakharda
- Tiraskund
- Tirhutbita
- Tirhutbita
- Tonha Israin
- Tope Nawabganj
- Twojastara
- Turkaili, Bihar

== U ==
- Uda, Bihar
- Ukhwa, Bihar
- Uphrail
- Urlaha

== See also ==
- Araria District
- Hatgaon
- List of villages in Bihar
