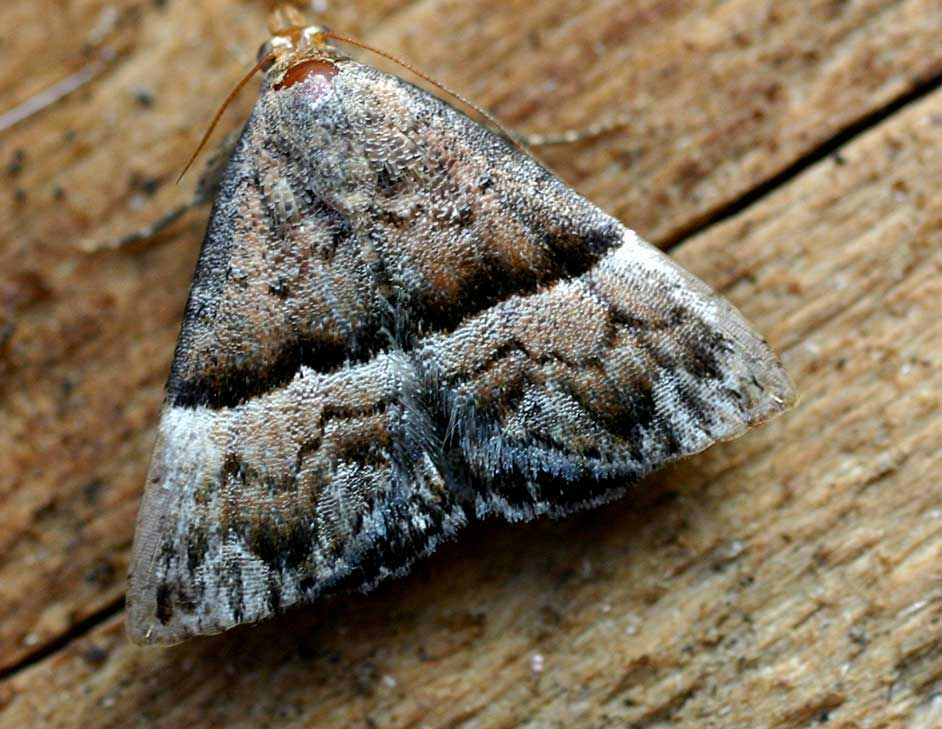
- Odice jucunda, the delightful marbled

Scientific classification
- Kingdom: Animalia
- Phylum: Arthropoda
- Clade: Pancrustacea
- Class: Insecta
- Order: Lepidoptera
- Superfamily: Noctuoidea
- Family: Noctuidae
- Subfamily: Acontiinae
- Tribe: Eublemmini; Forbes, 1954

Synonyms
- Eublemminae Forbes, 1954

= Eublemmini =

Tribe of moths

The Eublemmini are a tribe of noctuid ("owlet") moths, of the subfamily Acontiinae native to western Eurasia. The tribe was erected by William Trowbridge Merrifield Forbes in 1954.

While this tribe at present does not hold a large number of genera, many acontiines have not yet been assigned to tribes and thus this list should be considered preliminary.

== Genera ==
- Araeopteron
- Calymma
- Coccidiphaga
- Eublemma
- Eumestleta
- Eumicremma
- Glossodice
- Metachrostis
- Odice
- Proroblemma
- Rhypagla
- Trisateles
