= Mirdaul =

Rural village in Bihar

Coordinates: 26°13′16″N 87°08′01″E

- Rural village
- Interactive map of Mirdaul
- Country: India
- State: Bihar
- District: Araria

Government
  - Type: Panchayat
  - Sarpanch: Asharfi Ram

Area
  - Total: 1,260 ha (3,100 acres)

Population
  - Total: 11,381
- Time zone: Indian Standard Time
- Literacy rate: 41.6%
- Pincode: 854335
- Languages: Maithili, Hindustani

Mirdaul is a rural village in Araria district, Bihar. It is located in the Mithila region. Mirdaul has a total population of 11,381, of which 6,216 are male and 5,615 are female. The sarpanch of the village panchayat is Asharfi Ram, while their MLA constituency, Narpatganj assembly constituency, is represented by Devanti Yadav, and Mirdaul’s MP constituency, Araria parliamentary constituency, is represented by Pradeep Kumar Singh.

Location map of Araria district in Bihar, India, where Mirdaul is located.

Mirdaul’s total area is around 1,260 hectares, which is 3,110 acres. The literacy rate of the village is 41.6%, with common languages spoken including Maithili, Hindi, Urdu and Thethi.

The village of Mirdaul follows IST (Indian Standard Time), and the village’s pin-code is 854335. Nearby towns and villages include Belwa, Ajitnagar, Belsandi, Gokhulpur, Pithaura and Mirzapur. The nearest city to Mirdaul is Forbesganj, which is approximately 34 kilometres away.

Notable people include Amit Kumar Das, the founder of Moti Babu Institute of Technology, NRI businessman, Bihar Asmita Samman awardee, and software entrepreneur residing in Sydney, Australia.

== See also ==
List of villages in Araria district

Araria District
