= Siswa =

Siswa may refer to:

- Siswa, Araria, a village in Araria district, Bihar, India
- Siswa, East Champaran, a village in East Champaran district, Bihar, India
- Siswa, Purnia, a village in Purnia district, Bihar, India
- Siswa Assembly constituency, a constituency of the Uttar Pradesh Legislative Assembly
- Siswa River, a river and valley in Sankhuwasabha District, Nepal

== See also ==
- Siswa Bazar, a village in Uttar Pradesh, India
- Siswanto (disambiguation)
