= Phoenicophanta =

Scientific classification
- Kingdom: Animalia
- Phylum: Arthropoda
- Class: Insecta
- Order: Lepidoptera
- Superfamily: Noctuoidea
- Family: Noctuidae
- Subfamily: Eustrotiinae
- Genus: Phoenicophanta; Hampson, 1910

Synonyms
- Callostolis Dyar, 1928

Genus of moths

Phoenicophanta is a genus of moths of the family Noctuidae. The genus was erected by George Hampson in 1910.

== Species ==
- Phoenicophanta bicolor Barnes & McDunnough, 1916
- Phoenicophanta flavifera Hampson, 1910
- Phoenicophanta modestula Dyar, 1924
