= Siswanto =

Siswanto may refer to:

- Siswanto (footballer) (born 1984), Indonesian footballer
- Siswanto (serial killer) (born 1963), Indonesian serial killer
- Hendro Siswanto (born 1990), Indonesian footballer
- Siswanto Haidi (born 1972), Malaysian cricketer
- Fajar Legian Siswanto (born 1987), Indonesian footballer

== See also ==
- Siswa (disambiguation)
