= Thethi =

Thethi may refer to:

- Thēthi, a dialect of the Maithili language, spoken in parts of India and Nepal
- Theth, a small village within Shkodër County, Albania
