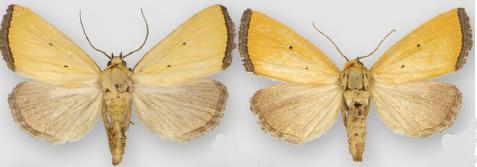
- Female (left) and male Marimatha nigrofi

Scientific classification
- Kingdom: Animalia
- Phylum: Arthropoda
- Class: Insecta
- Order: Lepidoptera
- Superfamily: Noctuoidea
- Family: Noctuidae
- Subfamily: Eustrotiinae
- Genus: Marimatha; Walker, [1866]

Synonyms
- Xanthoptera Guenée, 1852 (preocc. Xanthoptera Sodoffsky, 1837); Krugia Möschler, 1890; Thioptera Franclemont, 1950; Flavala Berio, 1966 (unnecessary replacement name for Xanthoptera)

= Marimatha =

Genus of moths

Marimatha is a genus of moths of the family Noctuidae. The genus was erected by Francis Walker in 1866.

== Selected species ==
- Marimatha aurifera (Walker, [1858]) southern US to Brazil, Antilles
- Marimatha auruda (Schaus, 1898) Brazil (São Paulo)
- Marimatha furcata (Walker, [1858]) Brazil
- Marimatha intensifica (Dyar, 1914) Panama
- Marimatha nigrofimbria (Guenée, 1852) southern and eastern US
- Marimatha obliquata (Herrich-Schäffer, 1868) Cuba
- Marimatha piscimala Ferris & Lafontaine, 2010 Texas, Arizona, Mexico, Panama, Costa Rica
- Marimatha quadrata Ferris & Lafontaine, 2010 Texas, Arizona, Mexico
- Marimatha rufescens (Hampson, 1910) Brazil (Bahia)
- Marimatha squala Ferris & Lafontaine, 2010 Arizona to Costa Rica
- Marimatha tripuncta (Möschler, 1890) Puerto Rico, southern Florida, Cuba, Dominican Republic, Haiti, Saint Croix, Virgin Islands, Trinidad
