= Tera Khurdah =

Darha Pipra डाढ़ापीपर
- village
- Nickname: दरहा पिपरा
- Location in Bihar, India Darha Pipra (India)
- Coordinates: 26.371775°N 87.484214°E
- Country: India
- State: Bihar
- District: Araria

Languages
  - Official: Hindi, Urdu, Thēthi
- Time zone: UTC+5:30 (IST)
- Postal code: 854331
- Vehicle registration: BR-

डाढ़ापीपर is an Indian village in Araria District, Bihar.
