= Pseudozarba mianoides =

Scientific classification
- Domain: Eukaryota
- Kingdom: Animalia
- Phylum: Arthropoda
- Class: Insecta
- Order: Lepidoptera
- Superfamily: Noctuoidea
- Family: Noctuidae
- Genus: Pseudozarba
- Species: P. mianoides

Binomial name
- Pseudozarba mianoides Hampson, 1893

Synonyms
- Ozarba mianoides Hampson, 1893

Species of insect

Pseudozarba mianoides is a moth of the family Noctuidae first described by George Hampson in 1893. It is found in Sri Lanka.
