= Brahmani, Raebareli =

Brahmani
- Village
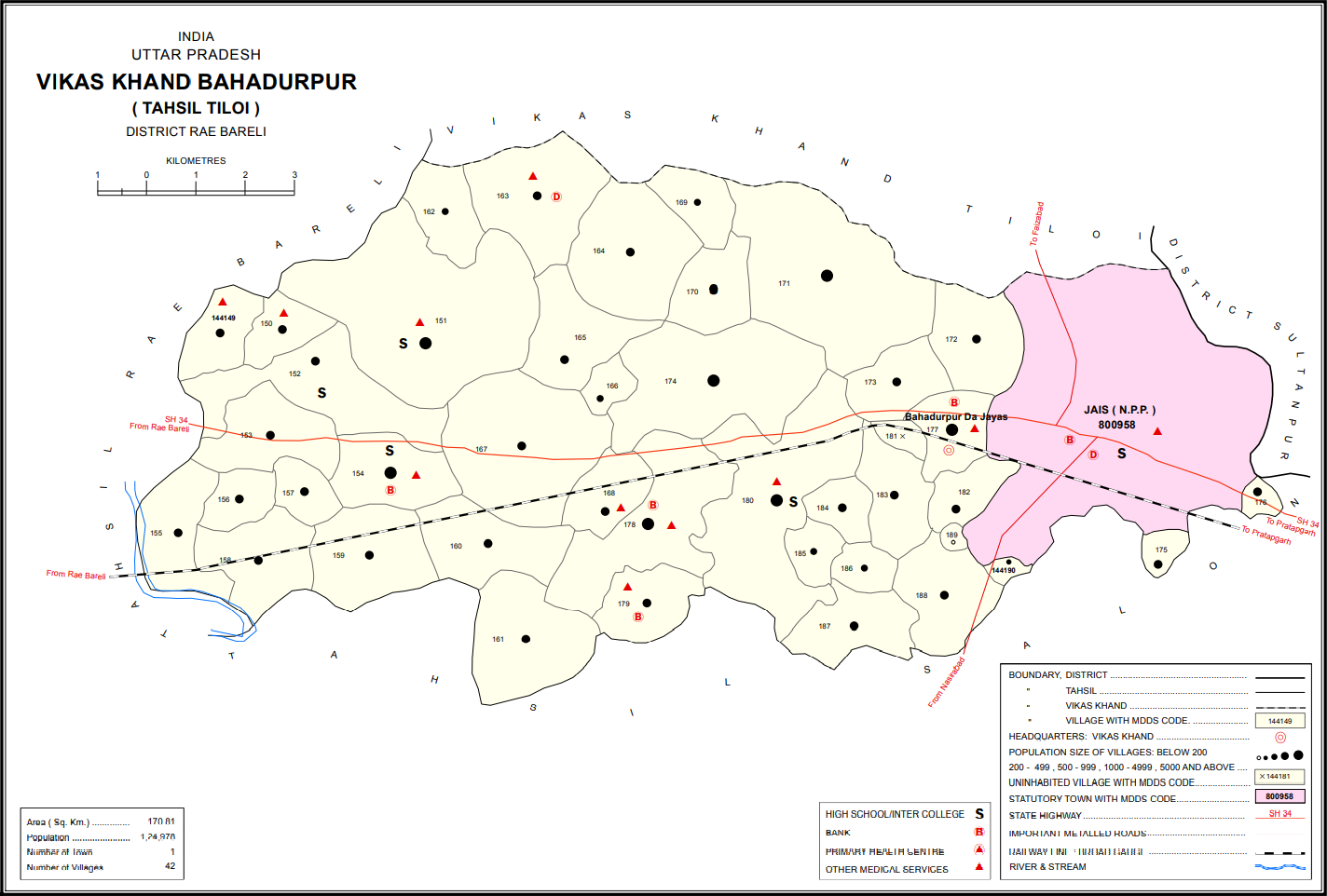
- Map showing Brahmani (#154) in Bahadurpur CD block

- Location in Uttar Pradesh, India
- Coordinates: 26.254893°N 81.400106°E
- Country India: India
- State: Uttar Pradesh
- District: Raebareli

Area
  - Total: 5.72 km^{2} (2.21 sq mi)

Population (2011)
  - Total: 6,163
  - Density: 1,080/km^{2} (2,790/sq mi)

Languages
  - Official: Hindi
- Time zone: UTC+5:30 (IST)
- PIN: 229308
- Vehicle registration: UP-35

Brahmani is a village in Bahadurpur block of Rae Bareli district, Uttar Pradesh, India. It includes the important bazar and railway station of Fursatganj. Fursatganj holds markets twice per week, on Thursdays and Sundays, where grain, vegetables, and cloth are the main items of trade. The place also hosts a large Dussehra festival annually on Asvina Sudi 15.

As of 2011, the total population of Brahmani is 6,163, in 1,087 households. It has 6 primary schools and 1 medical clinic. The main staple foods are wheat and juwar.

== History ==
Brahmani was historically part of the taluqdari estate belonging to the Rajas of Tiloi. Its commercial importance grew with the opening of the railway station at Fursatganj. At the turn of the 20th century, it also had a small school and a post office. The population in 1901 was 1,690, including a large number of Ahirs and Banias.

An aerodrome was constructed at Fursatganj in 1941–42.

The 1961 census recorded Brahmani (here spelled "Barhmani") as comprising 8 hamlets, with a total population of 1,928 people (980 male and 948 female), in 425 households and 423 physical houses. The area of the village was given as 1,381 acres. Average attendance of the Fursatganj biweekly market was about 3,000 people, and average of the annual Dussehra festival was about 9,000.

The 1981 census recorded Brahmani (again as "Barhmani") as having a population of 3,238 people, in 506 households, and having an area of 560.09 hectares.

== See also ==
- Fursatganj Airfield
