= Marimatha obliquata =

Scientific classification
- Kingdom: Animalia
- Phylum: Arthropoda
- Class: Insecta
- Order: Lepidoptera
- Superfamily: Noctuoidea
- Family: Noctuidae
- Genus: Marimatha
- Species: M. obliquata

Binomial name
- Marimatha obliquata (Herrich-Schäffer, 1868)

Synonyms
- Xanthoptera obliquata Herrich-Schäffer, 1868; Thioptera obliquata

Species of moth

Marimatha obliquata is a moth of the family Noctuidae first described by Gottlieb August Wilhelm Herrich-Schäffer in 1868. It is found on Cuba.
