= Eumestleta =

Scientific classification
- Domain: Eukaryota
- Kingdom: Animalia
- Phylum: Arthropoda
- Class: Insecta
- Order: Lepidoptera
- Superfamily: Noctuoidea
- Family: Noctuidae
- Subfamily: Eustrotiinae
- Genus: Eumestleta; Butler, 1892

Genus of moths

Eumestleta is a genus of moths of the family Erebidae. The genus was erected by Arthur Gardiner Butler in 1892.

It is considered by several sources to be a synonym of Eublemma Hübner, 1829.

== Former species ==
- Eumestleta cinnamomea Herrich-Schäffer, 1868
- Eumestleta irresoluta Dyar, 1919
- Eumestleta recta Guenée, 1852
