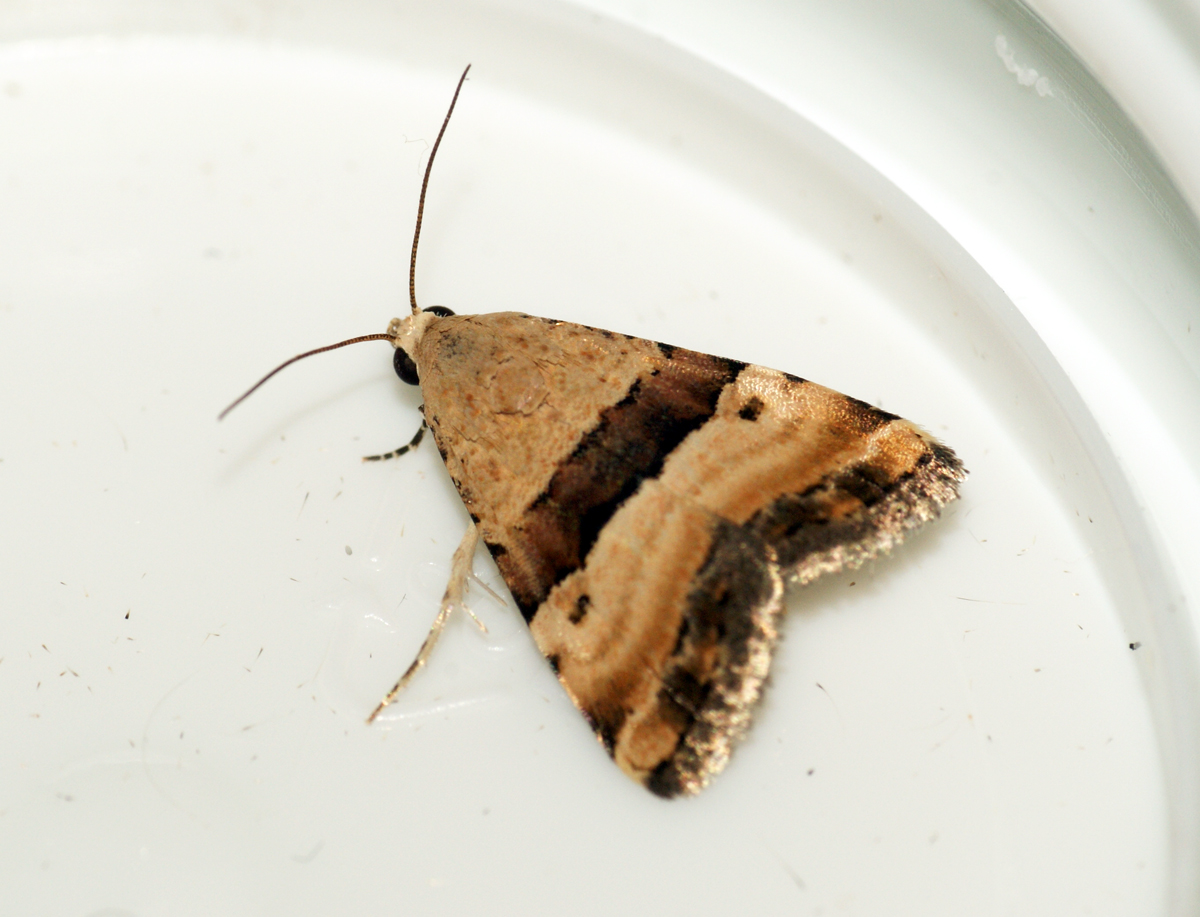
- Pseudozarba bipartita

Scientific classification
- Domain: Eukaryota
- Kingdom: Animalia
- Phylum: Arthropoda
- Class: Insecta
- Order: Lepidoptera
- Superfamily: Noctuoidea
- Family: Noctuidae
- Subfamily: Eustrotiinae
- Genus: Pseudozarba; Warren in Seitz, 1913

Synonyms
- Euthytoma Turner, 1920

= Pseudozarba =

Genus of moths

Pseudozarba is a genus of moths in the subfamily Eustrotiinae of the family Noctuidae. The genus was described by Warren in 1913.

== Species ==
- Pseudozarba abbreviata Rothschild, 1921 Niger
- Pseudozarba aethiops (Distant, 1898) Arabia, Sudan, Ethiopia, Kenya, Tanzania, Malawi, Botswana, Zambia, Zimbabwe, South Africa, Angola, Zaire, Gambia, Niger, Nigeria, Madagascar, Seychelles
- Pseudozarba bella Rothschild, 1921 Niger
- Pseudozarba bipartita (Herrich-Schäffer, [1850]) northern Africa, southern Europe, Sicily, Iran, Israel
- Pseudozarba carnibasalis (Hampson, 1918) Ghana, Ethiopia, Kenya, Uganda, Malawi, Tanzania
- Pseudozarba cupreofascia (Le Cerf, 1922) Burkina Faso, Yemen, Ethiopia, Kenya, Tanzania
- Pseudozarba excavata (Walker, 1865) southern India
- Pseudozarba expatriata (Hampson, 1914) Cape Verde, Senegal, Burkina Faso, northern Nigeria, Gambia
- Pseudozarba featheri Hacker, 2016 Kenya
- Pseudozarba fornax Hacker, 2016 Yemen, Oman
- Pseudozarba hemiplaca (Meyrick, 1902)
- Pseudozarba kaduna Hacker, 2016 Burkina Faso, northern Nigeria
- Pseudozarba leucopera (Hampson, 1910)
- Pseudozarba marmoreata Hacker, 2016 northern Nigeria
- Pseudozarba mesozona (Hampson, 1896) Arabia, Egypt, Djibouti, Eritrea, Sokotra
- Pseudozarba mianoides (Hampson, 1893) Sri Lanka
- Pseudozarba morosa Wiltshire, 1970 Burkina Faso, Nigeria, Gambia, Sudan
- Pseudozarba nilotica Hacker, 2016 Ethiopia
- Pseudozarba ochromaura Hacker, 2016 Namibia, South Africa, Ethiopia
- Pseudozarba opella (Swinhoe, 1885) Cape Verde, Ghana, Nigeria, Niger, Sudan, Eritrea, Somalia, Kenya, Zimbabwe, South Africa, India, Australia
- Pseudozarba orthopetes Meyrick, 1897
- Pseudozarba ozarbica (Hampson, 1910)
- Pseudozarba plumbicilia (Draudt, 1950) Sichuan
- Pseudozarba poliochlora Hacker, 2016 Tanzania
- Pseudozarba reducta Warren, 1913 Mumbai
- Pseudozarba regula (Gaede, 1916) Togo, Ghana, Kenya, Burundi, Zaire, South Africa
- Pseudozarba rufigrisea Warren, 1913 Sumba
- Pseudozarba schencki (Strand, 1912) Angola, Namibia, South Africa, Arabia
