= Naranga diffusa =

Rice green semilooper

Scientific classification
- Kingdom: Animalia
- Phylum: Arthropoda
- Clade: Pancrustacea
- Class: Insecta
- Order: Lepidoptera
- Superfamily: Noctuoidea
- Family: Noctuidae
- Genus: Naranga
- Species: N. diffusa

Binomial name
- Naranga diffusa Walker, 1865

Species of moth

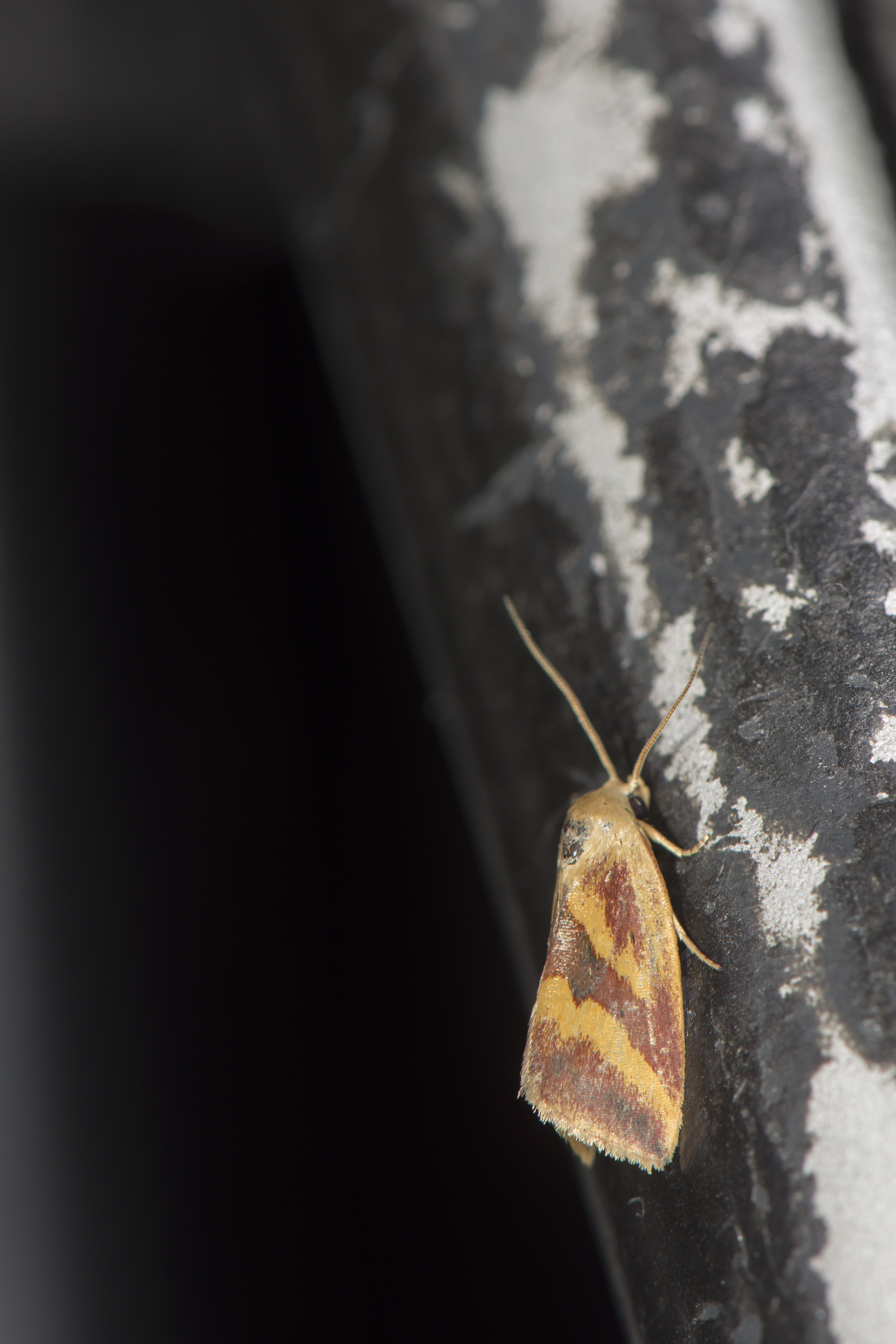
N. diffusa

Naranga diffusa, the rice green semilooper, is a moth of the family Noctuidae. The species was first described by Francis Walker in 1865. It is found in many agricultural based countries such as Bangladesh, India, Sri Lanka, China, Hong Kong, Iran, Japan, the Korean Peninsula, Malaysia, Myanmar, the Philippines, Thailand, Taiwan and Vietnam.

== Description ==
Palpi with second joint reaching above vertex of head and smoothly scaled, and third joint minute. Antennae somewhat thickened, annulate and minutely ciliated in male. Thorax and abdomen tuftless. Forewings with stalked veins 7, 8 and 9. Hindwings with veins 3 and 4 from cell or on a short stalk.

Adult has creamy coloured wings with two distinctive oblique bars of brown on the forewing. At the time the eggs are laid, they are yellowish, however the eggs develop purple markings when mature. Caterpillars are green or yellow green. There are narrow white lines which run along the body.

== Biology ==
The caterpillars are considered to be pests that attack crops such as Echinochloa colona, Echinochloa crus-galli, Eleusine indica, Leersia hexandra, Leptochloa chinensis, Oryza sativa, Paspalum conjugatum, Paspalum distichum and Sorghum bicolor. They feed on external tissues of leaves and never bore into the internal tissues. Heavy infestation leads to defoliation and leaf blades appear whitish.

== Controlling ==
Hand picking and light traps are useful to remove adults. For the caterpillars, crop sanitation, crop rotation and removal of weeds from the cultivation field is important. Land should be well fertilized and adequately irrigated. Many countries practise biological control measures to remove the pests. Caterpillars are highly susceptible for many strains of Bacillus thuringiensis. Therefore, many countries plant rice varieties which are genetically engineered with Bt genes. Natural enemies like wasps and other parasitoids provide control against pupal and larval stages.

Chemical sex attractants and pheromones are used in Japan, which provided good results. However, the best strategy to minimize the impact of green semiloopers is to ensure that the crop is well managed agronomically and monitored for the presence of pests on a weekly basis. This is known as integrated pest management.

Parasites such as Brachymeria lasus, Charops bicolor and Charops brachypterum can be used to control larva and pupa. Apanteles species can be used as parasites against larva. Predators such as Chlaenius bioculatus and Coccinella hieroglyphica also used in some countries. Eggs and larva can be eradicated by using Ophionea species. Many species of Trichogramma are effective against the eggs.
