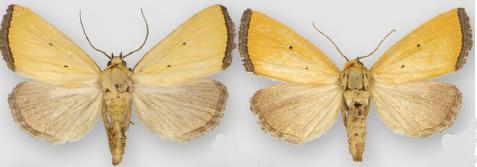
- Female (left) and male
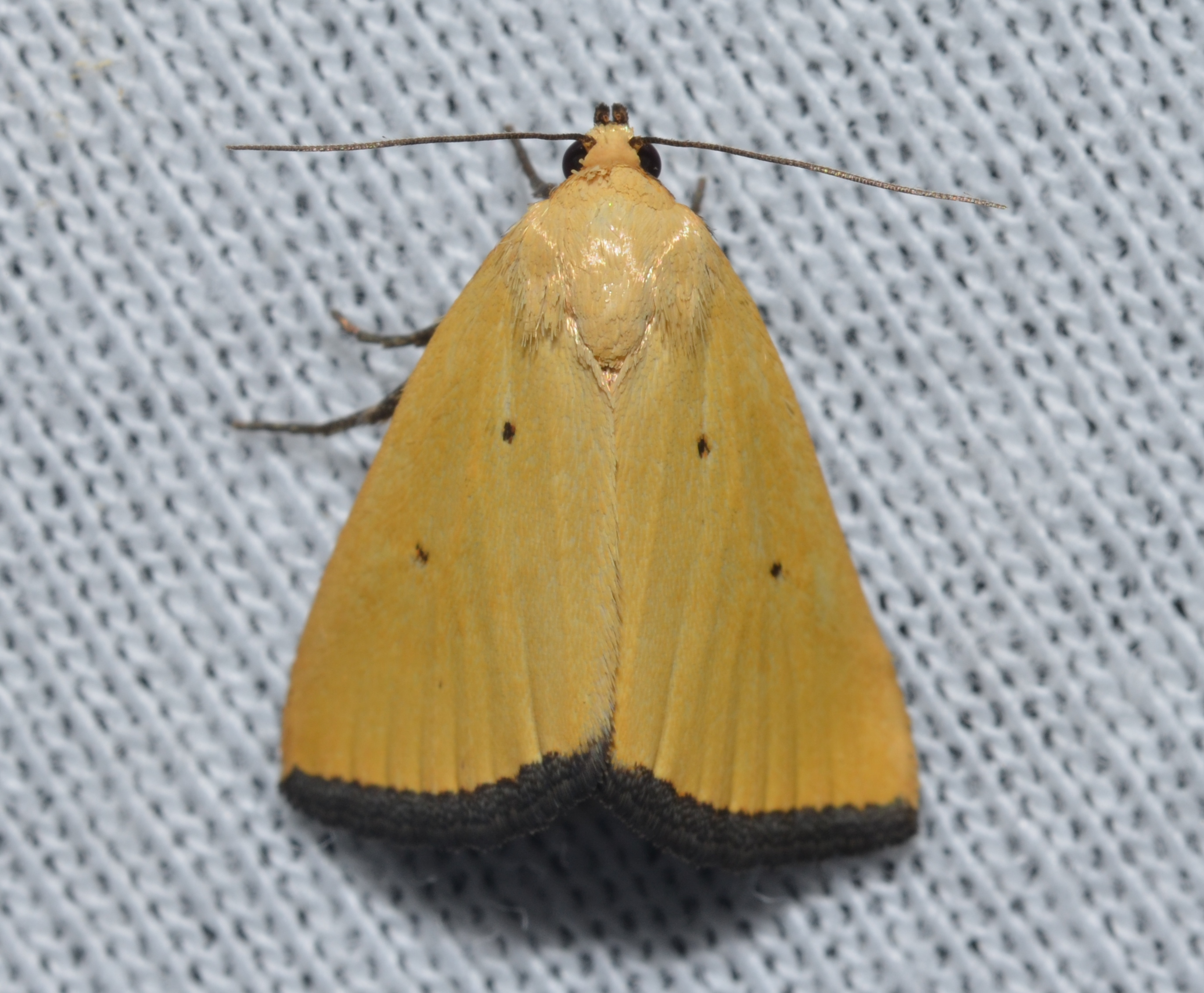

Scientific classification
- Kingdom: Animalia
- Phylum: Arthropoda
- Class: Insecta
- Order: Lepidoptera
- Superfamily: Noctuoidea
- Family: Noctuidae
- Genus: Marimatha
- Species: M. nigrofimbria

Binomial name
- Marimatha nigrofimbria (Guenée, 1852)

Synonyms
- Xanthoptera nigrofimbria Guenée in Boisduval and Guenée, 1852; Thioptera nigrofimbria (Guenée, 1852)

= Marimatha nigrofimbria =

Species of moth

Marimatha nigrofimbria, the black-bordered lemon moth, is a moth of the family Noctuidae. The species was first described by Achille Guenée in 1852. It is found in North America east of the Rocky Mountains and in Arizona and California.

The wingspan is 18–22 mm (0.71–0.87 in). Adults are on wing from May to September in the northern part of the range and from March to November in the south.

The larvae feed on Digitaria ischaemum and Ipomoea sagittata.

== Conservation ==
This species is listed as "Critically Imperiled" in New York State based on NY sitting at the Northern range limit.
