= Tahirpur, Raebareli =

Tahirpur
- Village
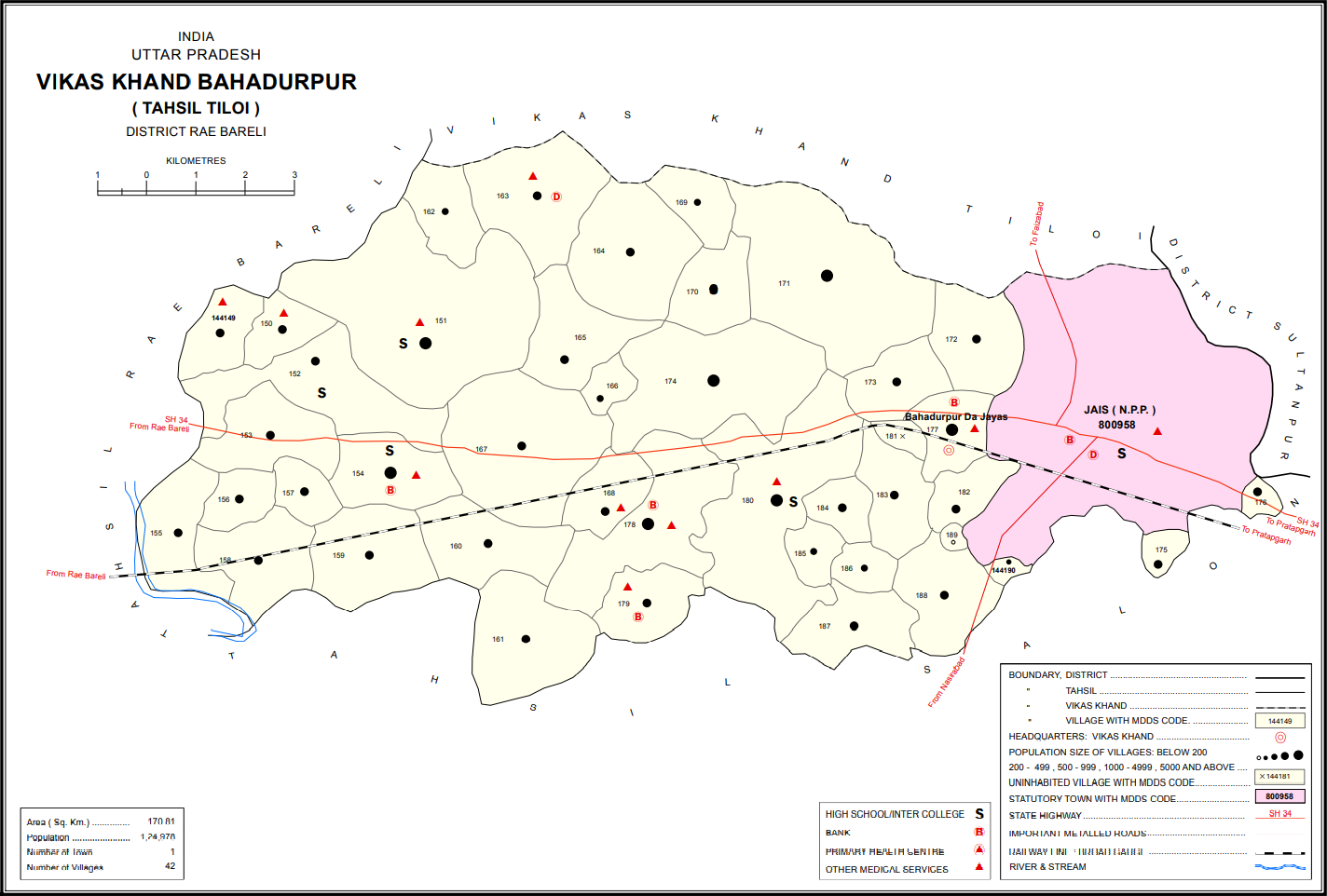
- Map showing Tahirpur (#144190) in Bahadurpur CD block

- Location in Uttar Pradesh, India
- Coordinates: 26.238823°N 81.529181°E
- Country India: India
- State: Uttar Pradesh
- District: Raebareli

Area
  - Total: 0.261 km^{2} (0.101 sq mi)

Population (2011)
  - Total: 327
  - Density: 1,250/km^{2} (3,240/sq mi)

Languages
  - Official: Hindi
- Time zone: UTC+5:30 (IST)
- Vehicle registration: UP-35

Tahirpur is a village in Bahadurpur block of Rae Bareli district, Uttar Pradesh, India. As of 2011, its population is 327, in 65 households. It has no schools and no healthcare facilities.

The 1961 census recorded Tahirpur as comprising 1 hamlet, with a total population of 65 people (37 male and 28 female), in 14 households and 14 physical houses. The area of the village was given as 86 acres.
