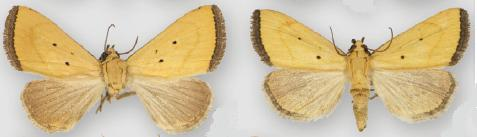
- Female (left) and male

Scientific classification
- Domain: Eukaryota
- Kingdom: Animalia
- Phylum: Arthropoda
- Class: Insecta
- Order: Lepidoptera
- Superfamily: Noctuoidea
- Family: Noctuidae
- Genus: Marimatha
- Species: M. quadrata

Binomial name
- Marimatha quadrata Ferris & Lafontaine, 2010

= Marimatha quadrata =

Species of moth

Marimatha quadrata is a moth of the family Noctuidae first described by Clifford D. Ferris and J. Donald Lafontaine in 2010. It is found from western Texas and Arizona and southward to southern Mexico (Sinaloa).

Adults are on wing from mid-May to mid-September.

== Etymology ==
The species name is derived from quadratus (four-cornered) in reference to the quadrangular process on the dorsal margin of the male valva.
