= Dehti =

Village in Bihar, India

Coordinates: 26.218°N 87.546°E

Dehti is a village in Araria district, Bihar, India. The majority of the population belong to Shaikh biradari (predominantly landlords), whilst others are Shaikhra and speak the Shaikhra dialect. The majority of literate persons speak Urdu and Hindustani also. It is the largest village in the block Palasi.
