= Bhikha =

Bhikha is a surname. Notable people with the surname include:

- Husmukh Bhikha (born 1958), New Zealand hockey player
- Zain Bhikha, South African singer-songwriter
