= Sarwan, Raebareli =

Sarwan
- Village
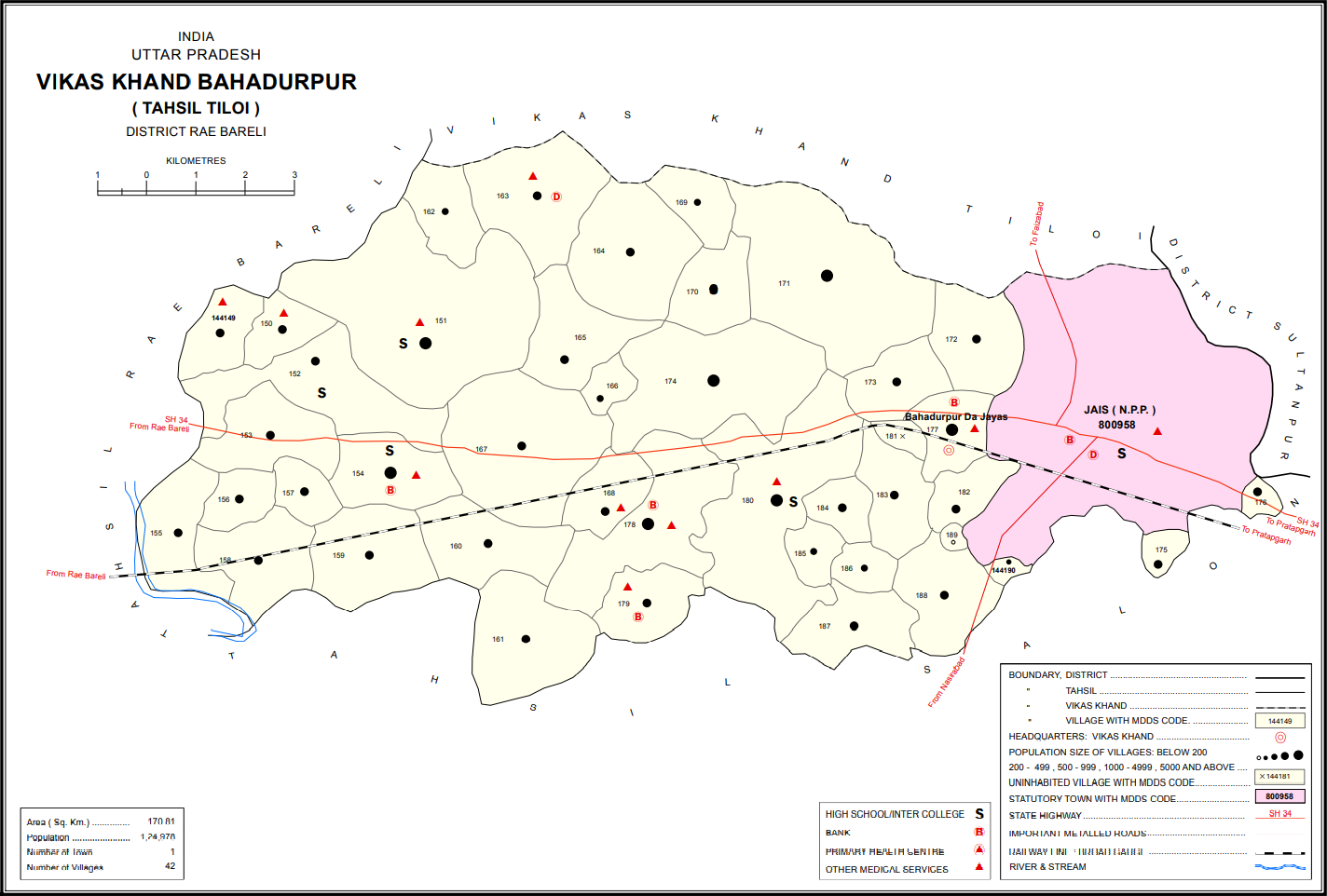
- Map showing Sarwan (#158) in Bahadurpur CD block

- Location in Uttar Pradesh, India
- Coordinates: 26.237537°N 81.37087°E
- Country India: India
- State: Uttar Pradesh
- District: Raebareli

Area
  - Total: 3.59 km^{2} (1.39 sq mi)

Population (2011)
  - Total: 3,009
  - Density: 838/km^{2} (2,170/sq mi)

Languages
  - Official: Hindi
- Time zone: UTC+5:30 (IST)
- Vehicle registration: UP-35

Sarwan is a village in Bahadurpur block of Rae Bareli district, Uttar Pradesh, India. As of 2011, its population is 3,009, in 574 households. It has one primary school and no healthcare facilities.

The 1961 census recorded Sarwan as comprising 6 hamlets, with a total population of 1,318 people (670 male and 648 female), in 293 households and 293 physical houses. The area of the village was given as 896 acres.

The 1981 census recorded Sarwan as having a population of 1,895 people, in 467 households, and having an area of 358.96 hectares.
