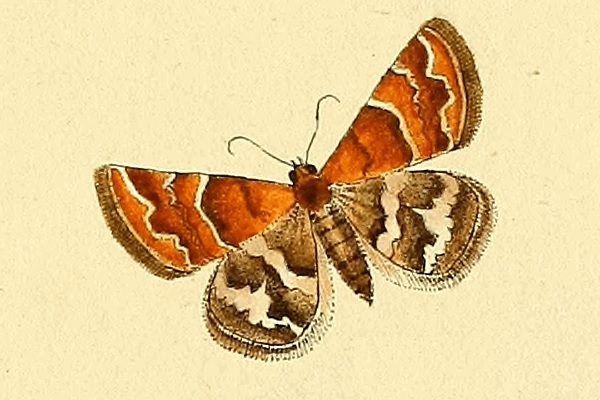

Scientific classification
- Kingdom: Animalia
- Phylum: Arthropoda
- Class: Insecta
- Order: Lepidoptera
- Superfamily: Noctuoidea
- Family: Erebidae
- Genus: Odice
- Species: O. suava

Binomial name
- Odice suava (Hübner, 1813)

Synonyms
- Noctua suava Hübner, 1813; Eublemma suava var. atlantica Schawerda & Stättermayer, 1934; Eublemma suava bithynica Schwingenschuss, 1939

= Odice suava =

Species of moth

Odice suava is a species of moth of the family Erebidae. It was described by Jacob Hübner in 1813. It is found in southern Europe, Algeria, Turkey and the Middle East.
