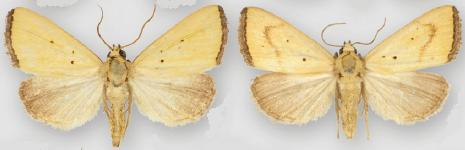
- Female (left) and male

Scientific classification
- Domain: Eukaryota
- Kingdom: Animalia
- Phylum: Arthropoda
- Class: Insecta
- Order: Lepidoptera
- Superfamily: Noctuoidea
- Family: Noctuidae
- Genus: Marimatha
- Species: M. tripuncta

Binomial name
- Marimatha tripuncta (Möschler, 1890)

Synonyms
- Xanthoptera tripuncta Möschler, 1890; Thioptera aurifera of authors, not (Walker, [1858])

= Marimatha tripuncta =

Species of moth

Marimatha tripuncta is a moth of the family Noctuidae first described by Heinrich Benno Möschler in 1890. It is found in the Caribbean and southern Florida.

Adults are on wing from late April to mid-October.
