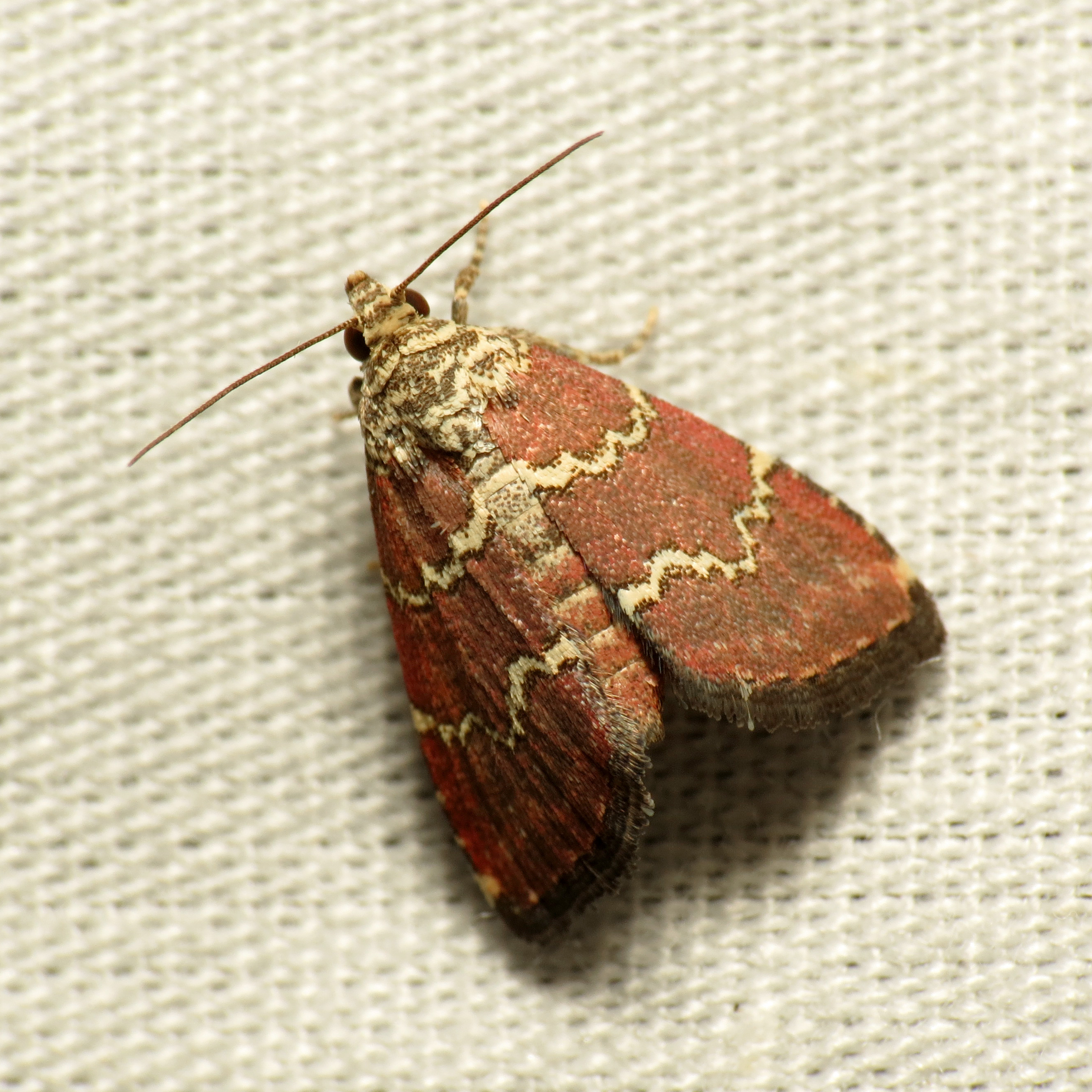

Scientific classification
- Kingdom: Animalia
- Phylum: Arthropoda
- Class: Insecta
- Order: Lepidoptera
- Superfamily: Noctuoidea
- Family: Noctuidae
- Genus: Phoenicophanta
- Species: P. modestula

Binomial name
- Phoenicophanta modestula Dyar, 1924

= Phoenicophanta modestula =

Species of moth

Phoenicophanta modestula is a moth in the family Noctuidae (the owlet moths) first described by Harrison Gray Dyar Jr. in 1924. It is found in North America.

The MONA or Hodges number for Phoenicophanta modestula is 9029.
