= Khalispur, Raebareli =

Khalispur Khālispur
- Village
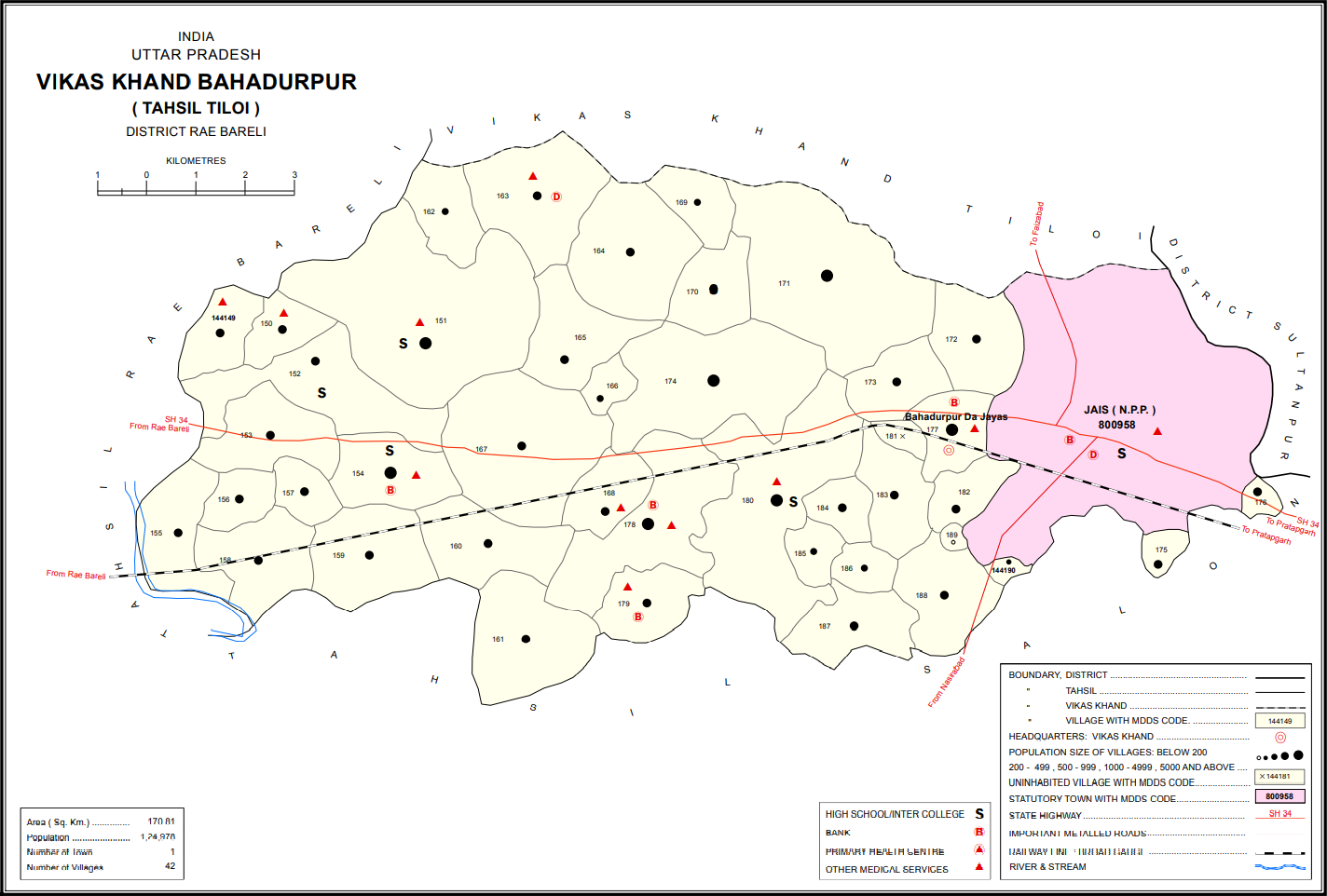
- Map showing Khalispur (#152) in Bahadurpur CD block

- Location in Uttar Pradesh, India
- Coordinates: 26.267373°N 81.381087°E
- Country India: India
- State: Uttar Pradesh
- District: Raebareli

Area
  - Total: 4.693 km^{2} (1.812 sq mi)

Population (2011)
  - Total: 3,554
  - Density: 757.3/km^{2} (1,961/sq mi)

Languages
  - Official: Hindi
- Time zone: UTC+5:30 (IST)
- Vehicle registration: UP-35

Khalispur is a village in Bahadurpur block of Rae Bareli district, Uttar Pradesh, India. As of 2011, its population is 3,554, in 607 households. It has one primary school and no healthcare facilities.

The 1961 census recorded Khalispur as comprising 10 hamlets, with a total population of 1,232 people (655 male and 577 female), in 278 households and 276 physical houses. The area of the village was given as 1,168 acres.

The 1981 census recorded Khalispur as having a population of 2,001 people, in 384 households, and having an area of 469.44 hectares.
