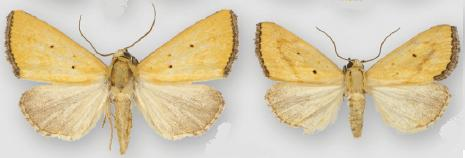
- Female (left) and male

Scientific classification
- Domain: Eukaryota
- Kingdom: Animalia
- Phylum: Arthropoda
- Class: Insecta
- Order: Lepidoptera
- Superfamily: Noctuoidea
- Family: Noctuidae
- Genus: Marimatha
- Species: M. piscimala

Binomial name
- Marimatha piscimala Ferris & Lafontaine, 2010

= Marimatha piscimala =

Species of moth

Marimatha piscimala is a moth of the family Noctuidae first described by Clifford D. Ferris and J. Donald Lafontaine in 2010. It is found from south-eastern Texas to Arizona southward to Panama.

Adults are on wing from mid-April to mid-October, probably in several generations.
