= Pidhi =

Pidhi Pīḍhī
- Village
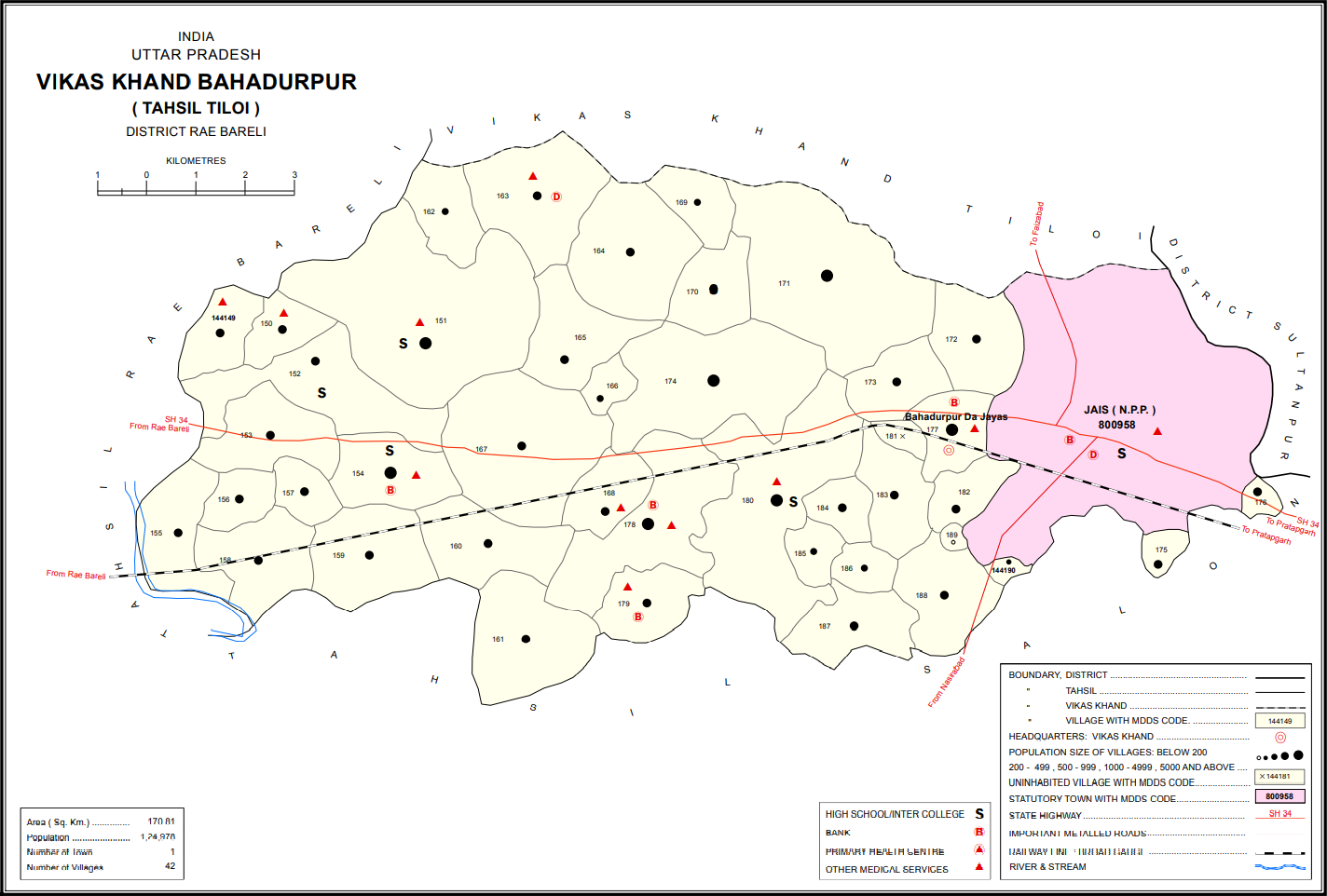
- Map showing Pidhi (#151) in Bahadurpur CD block

- Location in Uttar Pradesh, India
- Coordinates: 26.285026°N 81.407723°E
- Country India: India
- State: Uttar Pradesh
- District: Raebareli

Area
  - Total: 12.961 km^{2} (5.004 sq mi)

Population (2011)
  - Total: 8,580
  - Density: 662/km^{2} (1,710/sq mi)

Languages
  - Official: Hindi
- Time zone: UTC+5:30 (IST)
- Vehicle registration: UP-35

Pidhi (Pīḍhī) is a village in Bahadurpur block of Rae Bareli district, Uttar Pradesh, India. As of 2011 its population was 8,580, in 1,561 households. It has 5 primary schools and no healthcare facilities.

The 1961 census recorded Pidhi (as "Pirhi") as comprising 22 hamlets, with a total population of 3,579 people (1,871 male and 1,708 female), in 819 households and 789 physical houses. The area of the village was given as 3,317 acres.

The 1981 census recorded Pidhi (also as "Pirhi") as having a population of 4,612 people, in 976 households, and having an area of 130.31 hectares.
