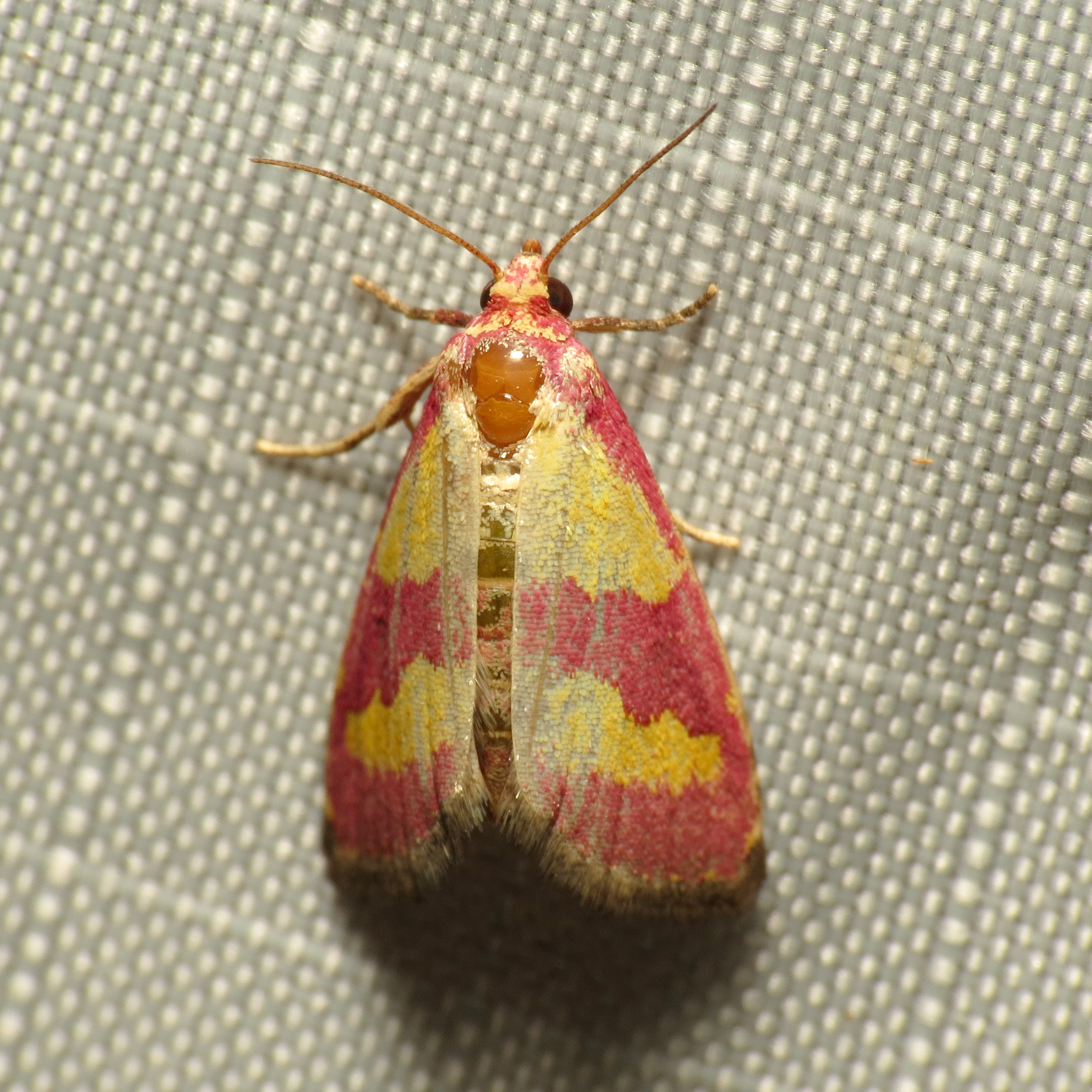

Scientific classification
- Domain: Eukaryota
- Kingdom: Animalia
- Phylum: Arthropoda
- Class: Insecta
- Order: Lepidoptera
- Superfamily: Noctuoidea
- Family: Noctuidae
- Genus: Phoenicophanta
- Species: P. bicolor

Binomial name
- Phoenicophanta bicolor Barnes & McDunnough, 1916

= Phoenicophanta bicolor =

Species of moth

Phoenicophanta bicolor is a species of moth in the family Noctuidae (the owlet moths). It was first described by William Barnes and James Halliday McDunnough in 1916 and it is found in North America.

The MONA or Hodges number for Phoenicophanta bicolor is 9028.
