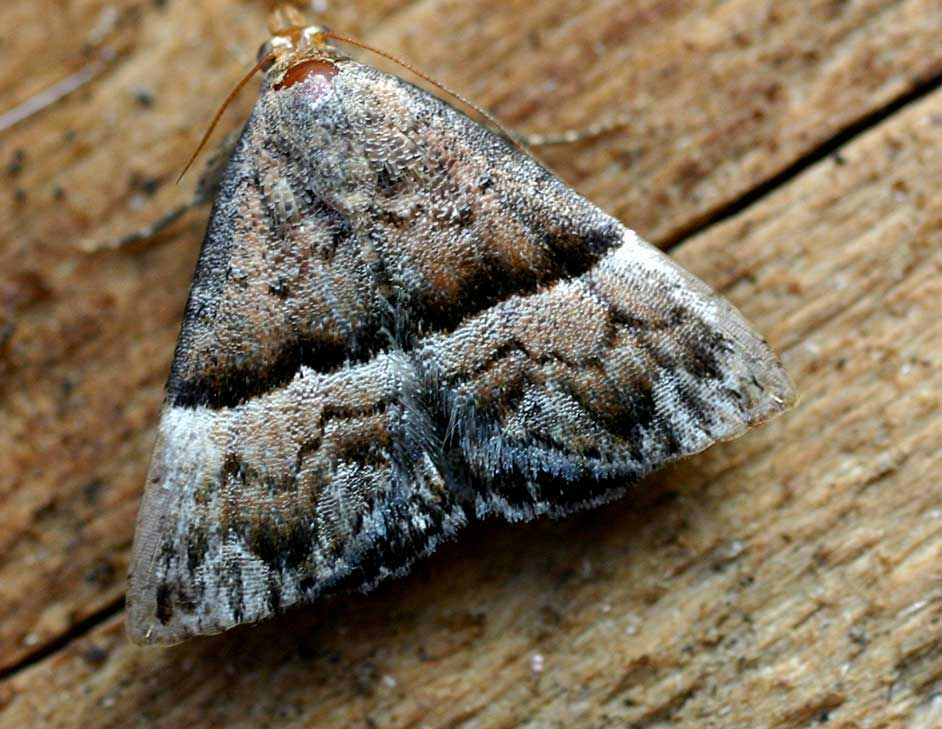
- Odice jucunda

Scientific classification
- Kingdom: Animalia
- Phylum: Arthropoda
- Clade: Pancrustacea
- Class: Insecta
- Order: Lepidoptera
- Superfamily: Noctuoidea
- Family: Erebidae
- Subfamily: Boletobiinae
- Genus: Odice; Hübner, [1823]

= Odice =

Genus of moths

Odice is a genus of moths of the family Erebidae. The genus was erected by Jacob Hübner in 1823.

== Taxonomy ==
The genus has previously been classified in the subfamily Eublemminae of Erebidae or the subfamily Eustrotiinae of the family Noctuidae.

== Species ==
- Odice arcuinna Hübner, 1790
- Odice blandula Rambur, 1858
- Odice jucunda Hübner, [1813] – delightful marbled moth
- Odice pergrata Rambur, 1858
- Odice suava Hübner, [1813]
