= Chak Mamha =

- Village
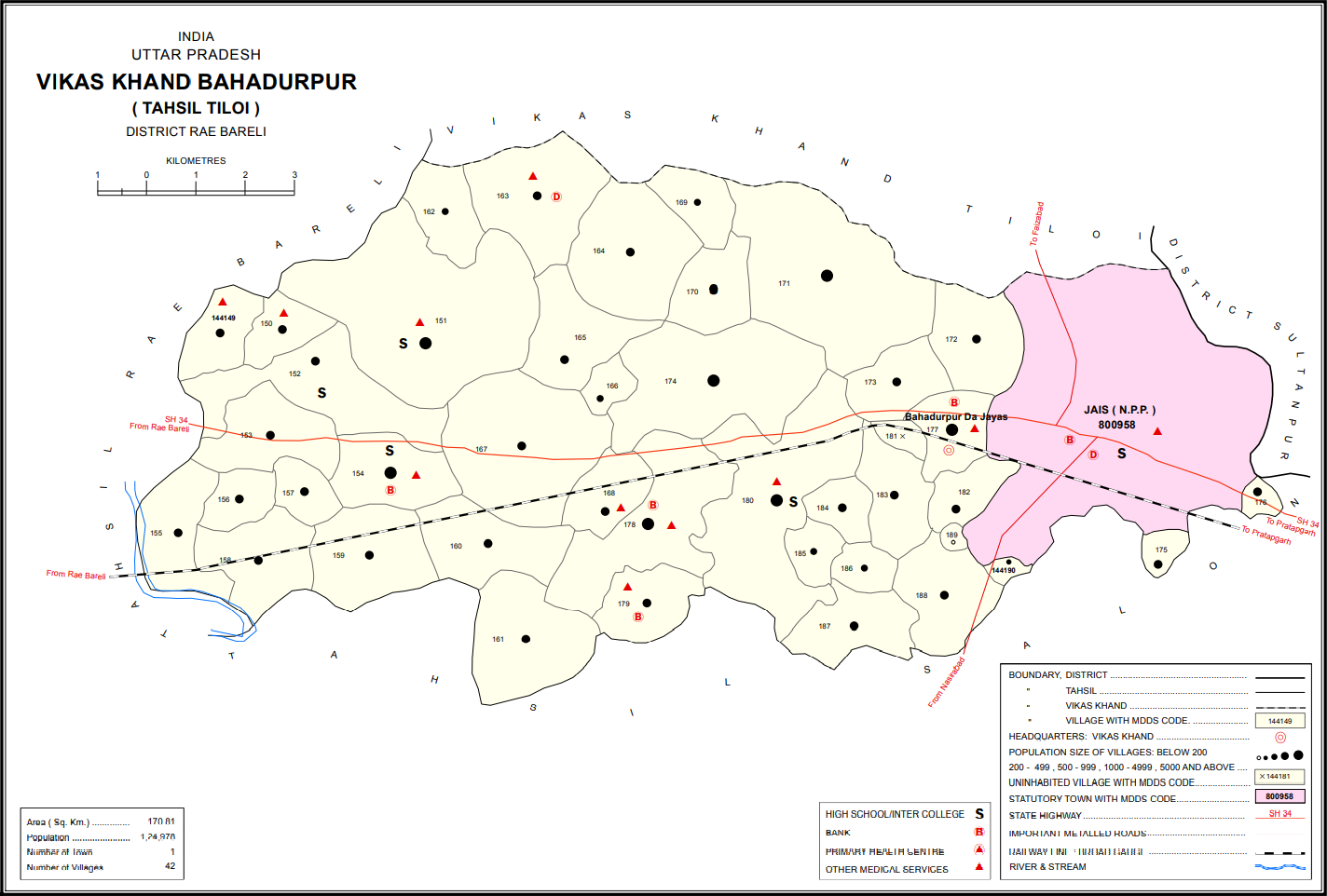
- Map showing Chak Mamha (#186) in Bahadurpur CD block

- Location in Uttar Pradesh, India
- Coordinates: 26.240156°N 81.502767°E
- Country India: India
- State: Uttar Pradesh
- District: Raebareli

Area
  - Total: 0.832 km^{2} (0.321 sq mi)

Population (2011)
  - Total: 663
  - Density: 797/km^{2} (2,060/sq mi)

Languages
  - Official: Hindi
- Time zone: UTC+5:30 (IST)
- PIN: 229308
- Vehicle registration: UP-35

Chak Mamha is a village in Bahadurpur block of Rae Bareli district, Uttar Pradesh, India. As of 2011, its population is 663, in 99 households. It has one primary school and no healthcare facilities.

The 1961 census recorded Chak Mamha as comprising 2 hamlets, with a total population of 221 people (122 male and 99 female), in 32 households and 32 physical houses. The area of the village was given as 287 acres.

The 1981 census recorded Chak Mamha as having a population of 320 people, in 56 households, and having an area of 111.29 hectares.
