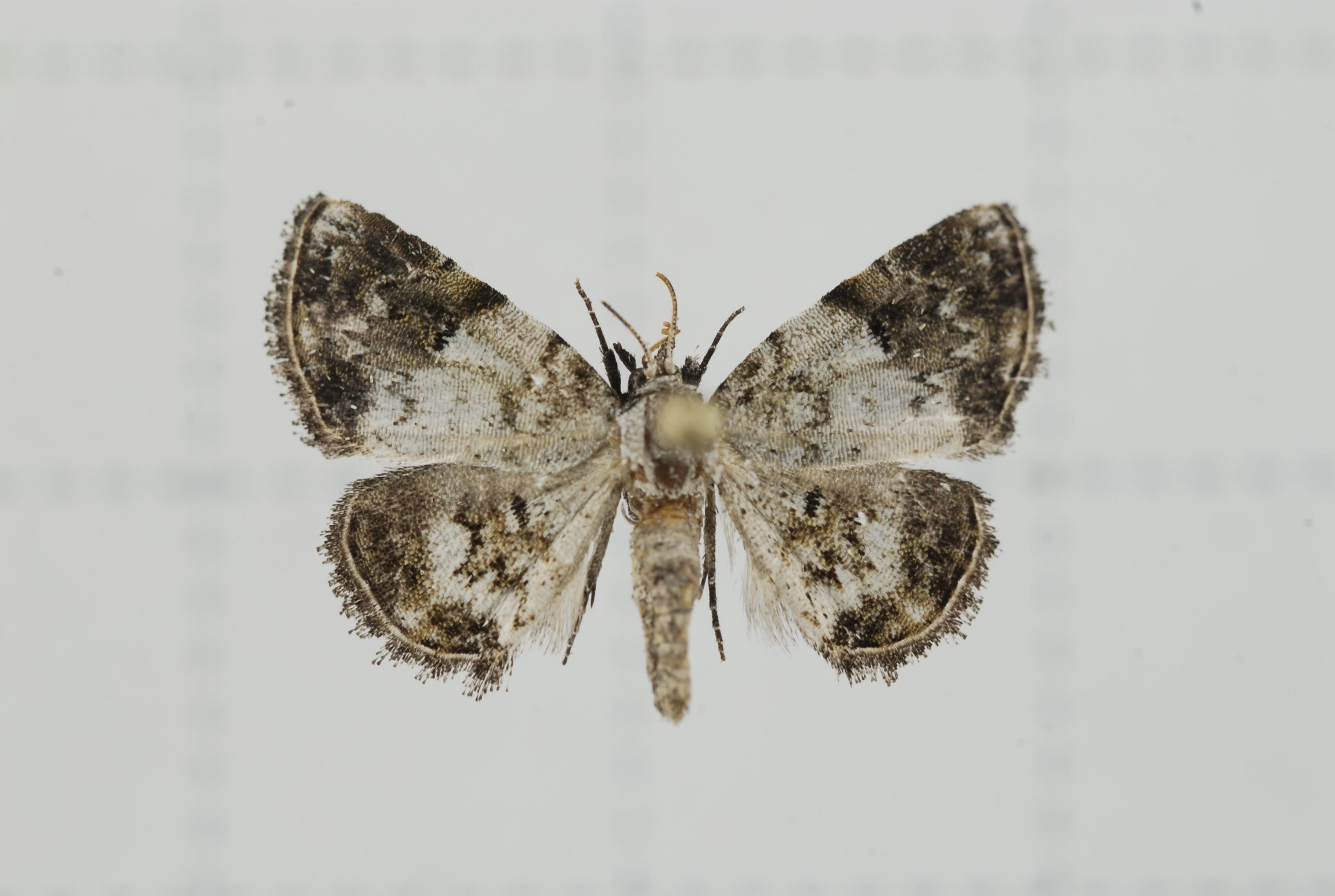
- Catoblemma semialba

Scientific classification
- Domain: Eukaryota
- Kingdom: Animalia
- Phylum: Arthropoda
- Class: Insecta
- Order: Lepidoptera
- Superfamily: Noctuoidea
- Family: Noctuidae
- Subfamily: Eustrotiinae
- Genus: Catoblemma

= Catoblemma =

Genus of moths

Catoblemma is a genus of moths of the family Noctuidae.
