= Bahadurpur, Raebareli =

Bahadurpur
- Village
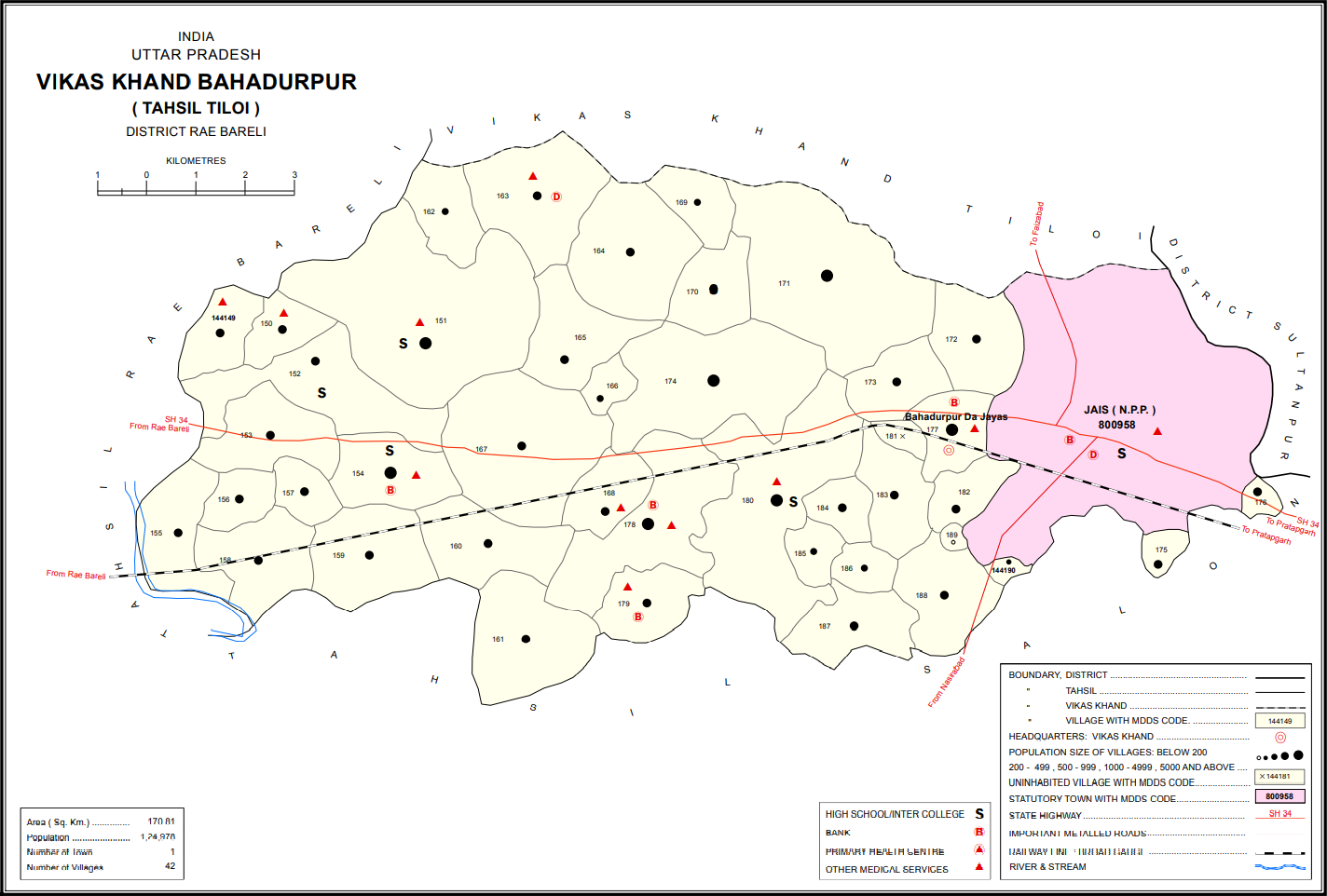
- Map of Bahadurpur CD block
- Country India: India
- State: Uttar Pradesh
- District: Raebareli

Area
  - Total: 24.44 km^{2} (9.44 sq mi)

Population (2011)
  - Total: 17,595
  - Density: 719.9/km^{2} (1,865/sq mi)

Languages
  - Official: Hindi
- Time zone: UTC+5:30 (IST)
- PIN: 229308
- Vehicle registration: UP-35

Bahadurpur, also called Bahadurpur Da Jayas, is a village and corresponding community development block in Tiloi tehsil of Rae Bareli district, Uttar Pradesh, India. It is located 3 km from the town of Jais. As of 2011, its population is 17,595, in 2,951 households. The main staple foods are wheat and rice.

The 1961 census recorded Bahadurpur as comprising 4 hamlets, with a total population of 539 people (315 male and 224 female), in 135 households and 133 physical houses. The area of the village was given as 592 acres.

The 1981 census recorded Bahadurpur as having a population of 969 people, in 332 households, and having an area of 62.32 hectares.

== Villages ==
Bahadurpur CD block has the following 42 villages:

Village name	Total land area (hectares)	Population (in 2011)
Kotwar Mau	198.9	1,616
Mahmoodpur	177.9	1,510
Pidhi	1,296.1	8,580
Khalispur	469.3	3,554
Jamalpur Rampur	301.6	2,792
Brahmani	572	6,163
Kisunpur Kewae	327	2,515
Saimbasi	163.5	1,371
Tarauna	143.6	1,077
Sarwan	359	3,009
Mohaiya Kesariya	503.9	3,247
Bhadaiya Mahmoodpur	405.4	3,483
Khairahana	413.4	2,829
Bhadehara	177.2	938
Nawawan	486.4	3,543
Urwa	566.1	4,071
Kesariya Salimpur	307.4	2,539
Chak Dahira Mau	68.6	532
Nigohan	330.5	3,584
Basauni	198.7	1,898
Daulatpur Sidhariya	188.6	895
Fareedpur Parwar	268.4	1,917
Mohana	963.4	8,073
Pure Badyrai	295.9	1,769
Mubarakpur Mukhatiya	219.1	2,263
Sarai Mahesha	777.8	5,706
Nakdaiyapur	84.5	1,375
Kasimpur	118.5	1,860
Bahadurpur Da Jayas (block headquarters)	2,444	17,595
Tendva	1,476.2	5,137
Fatehpur Mawaiya	358.4	2,133
Odaree	5,991	1,054
Chak Baisana	55.6	0
Mawai Alampur	261.4	3,069
Kharauli	165.3	1,946
Baghail	182.3	1,373
Chak Bhoor	74.6	670
Chak Mamha	83.2	663
Bojhi Mula Mau	471.9	1,468
Behta Murtajapur	110.6	1,856
Chak Malehra	7.1	41
Tahirpur	26.1	327
