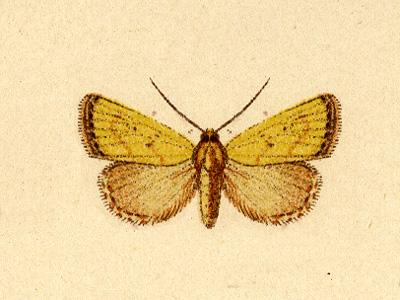

Scientific classification
- Kingdom: Animalia
- Phylum: Arthropoda
- Class: Insecta
- Order: Lepidoptera
- Superfamily: Noctuoidea
- Family: Noctuidae
- Genus: Marimatha
- Species: M. aurifera

Binomial name
- Marimatha aurifera (Walker, [1858])

Synonyms
- Xanthoptera aurifera Walker, [1858]; Thioptera aurifera

= Marimatha aurifera =

Species of moth

Marimatha aurifera is a moth of the family Noctuidae first described by Francis Walker in 1858. It is found in Brazil, and other countries in South America. The species has been listed erroneously as occurring in the Caribbean and in North America (Florida and Texas).
