= Chak Dahiramau =

Chak Dahiramau Chak Dahirāmau
- Village
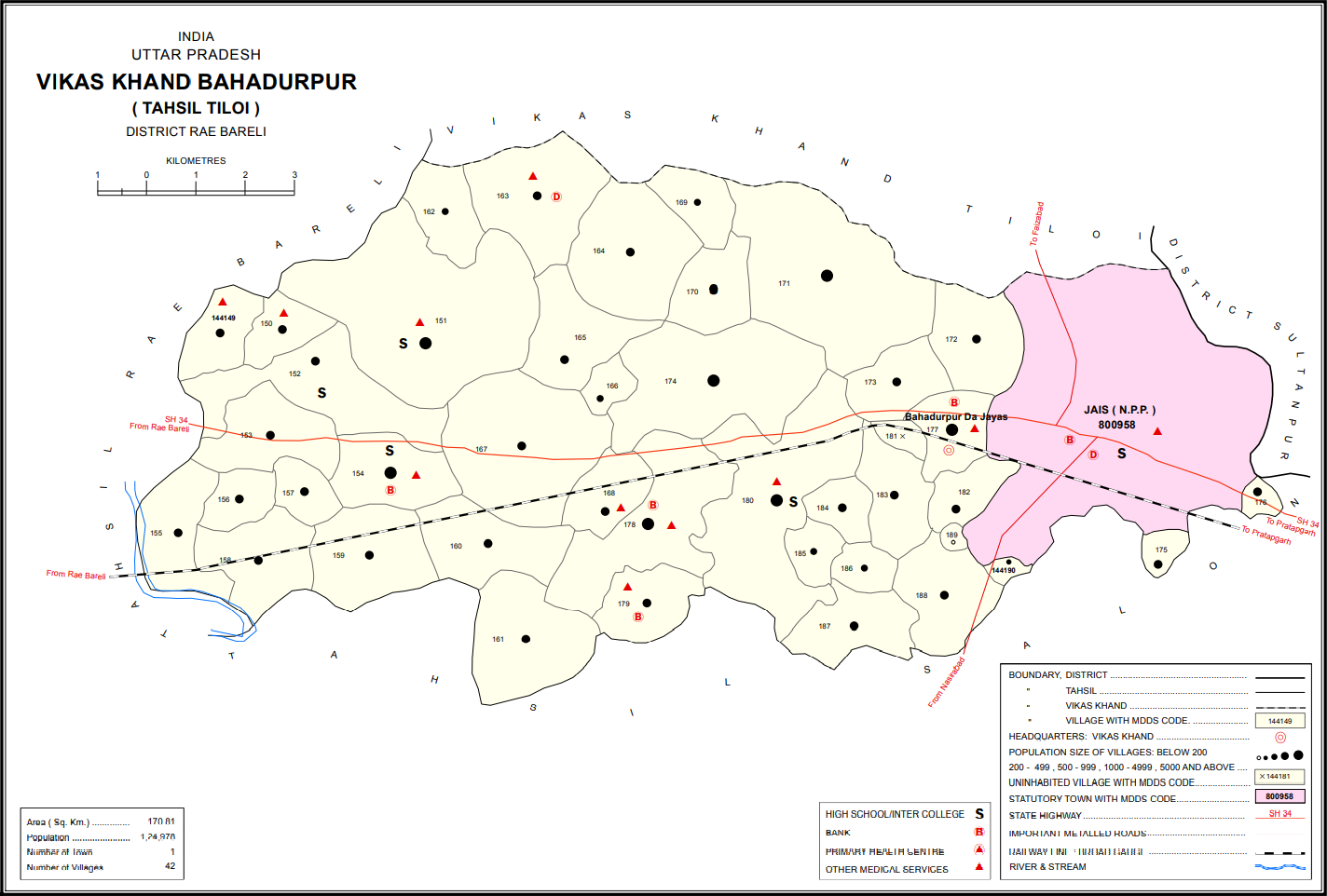
- Map showing Chak Dahiramau (#166) in Bahadurpur CD block

- Location in Uttar Pradesh, India
- Coordinates: 26.271106°N 81.448004°E
- Country India: India
- State: Uttar Pradesh
- District: Raebareli

Area
  - Total: 0.686 km^{2} (0.265 sq mi)

Population (2011)
  - Total: 532
  - Density: 776/km^{2} (2,010/sq mi)

Languages
  - Official: Hindi
- Time zone: UTC+5:30 (IST)
- PIN: 229308
- Vehicle registration: UP-35

Chak Dahiramau is a village in Bahadurpur block of Rae Bareli district, Uttar Pradesh, India. As of 2011, its population is 532, in 106 households. It has one primary school and no healthcare facilities.

The 1961 census recorded Chak Dahiramau as comprising 1 hamlet, with a total population of 173 people (95 male and 78 female), in 41 households and 41 physical houses. The area of the village was given as 178 acres.

The 1981 census recorded Chak Dahiramau as having a population of 302 people, in 59 households, and having an area of 69.61 hectares.
