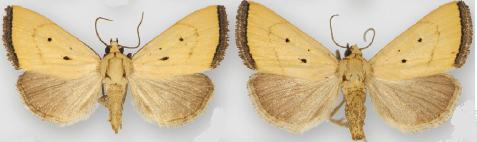
- Female (left) and male

Scientific classification
- Domain: Eukaryota
- Kingdom: Animalia
- Phylum: Arthropoda
- Class: Insecta
- Order: Lepidoptera
- Superfamily: Noctuoidea
- Family: Noctuidae
- Genus: Marimatha
- Species: M. squala

Binomial name
- Marimatha squala Ferris & Lafontaine, 2010

= Marimatha squala =

Species of moth

Marimatha squala is a moth of the family Noctuidae first described by Clifford D. Ferris and J. Donald Lafontaine in 2010. It is found from Arizona, southward to Costa Rica.

Adults are on wing from mid-July to mid-August in Arizona and from late May in Costa Rica.
