= Bangawan =

- Census town
- Location in Madhya Pradesh, India Bangawan (India)
- Coordinates: 23°11′24″N 82°7′26″E
- Country: India
- State: Madhya Pradesh
- District: Shahdol

Population (2001)
  - Total: 20,719

Languages
  - Official: Hindi
- Time zone: UTC+5:30 (IST)
- ISO 3166 code: IN-MP
- Vehicle registration: MP

Bangawan is a census town in Shahdol district in the state of Madhya Pradesh, India.

== Demographics ==
As of a 2001 India census, Bangawan had a population of 20,719. Males constitute 53% of the population and females 47%. Bangawan has an average literacy rate of 63%, higher than the national average of 59.5%; with 61% of the males and 39% of females literate. 14% of the population is under 6 years of age.
