= Siswa, East Champaran =

Village in East Champaran district, Bihar, India

Siswa is a village and a notified area in East Champaran district in the state of Bihar, India. Siswa is divided into two Panchayat (or Notified Area Councils), Siswa-pashchmi (West-Siswa) and Siswa-Pusvi (East-Siswa). It comes under Banjariya block and Motihari subdivision. In the last 10–15 years Dhaka emerged as the market place for its nearby area. The population was 23,136 as of the 2011 Indian census.
