= Hatgaon =

Hatgaon hatgaon
- village
- Country: India
- State: Bihar
- District: Araria
- Established: o4/01/1950
- Founder: Salimuddin

Population 10000
  - Total: 10,000

Languages
  - Official: Hindi, Urdu, English
- Time zone: UTC+5:30 (IST)
- Postal code: 854329
- Vehicle registration: Bihar
- Coastline: 0 kilometres (0 mi)
- Nearest city: Denga chowk
- Lok Sabha constituency: Araria
- Website: @hatgaon.ac.in

Hatgaon is a hamlet in western Bihar, India. The main religion is Muslim. The village contributed to the Indian freedom struggle. In 1857, its people were persecuted by the British for participating in the rebellion and lynching five horse driven British officers, who came to the village during the rebellion. In retribution, and not knowing who were actual killers, British rulers imposed harsh sanctions and severe hardships for the inhabitants of Hatgaon and four surrounding villages, Kumehia, Gyaspur, Sangora? and Marichgaon. The people of the village suffered a lot as a result for nearly a century till the country gained independence.

A madarsa is there named Madarsa islamia hasmi hatgaon founder of it was Munsi Salimuddin.

There is a cricket field named kawwa mari stadium.
