= Tarauna =

- Village
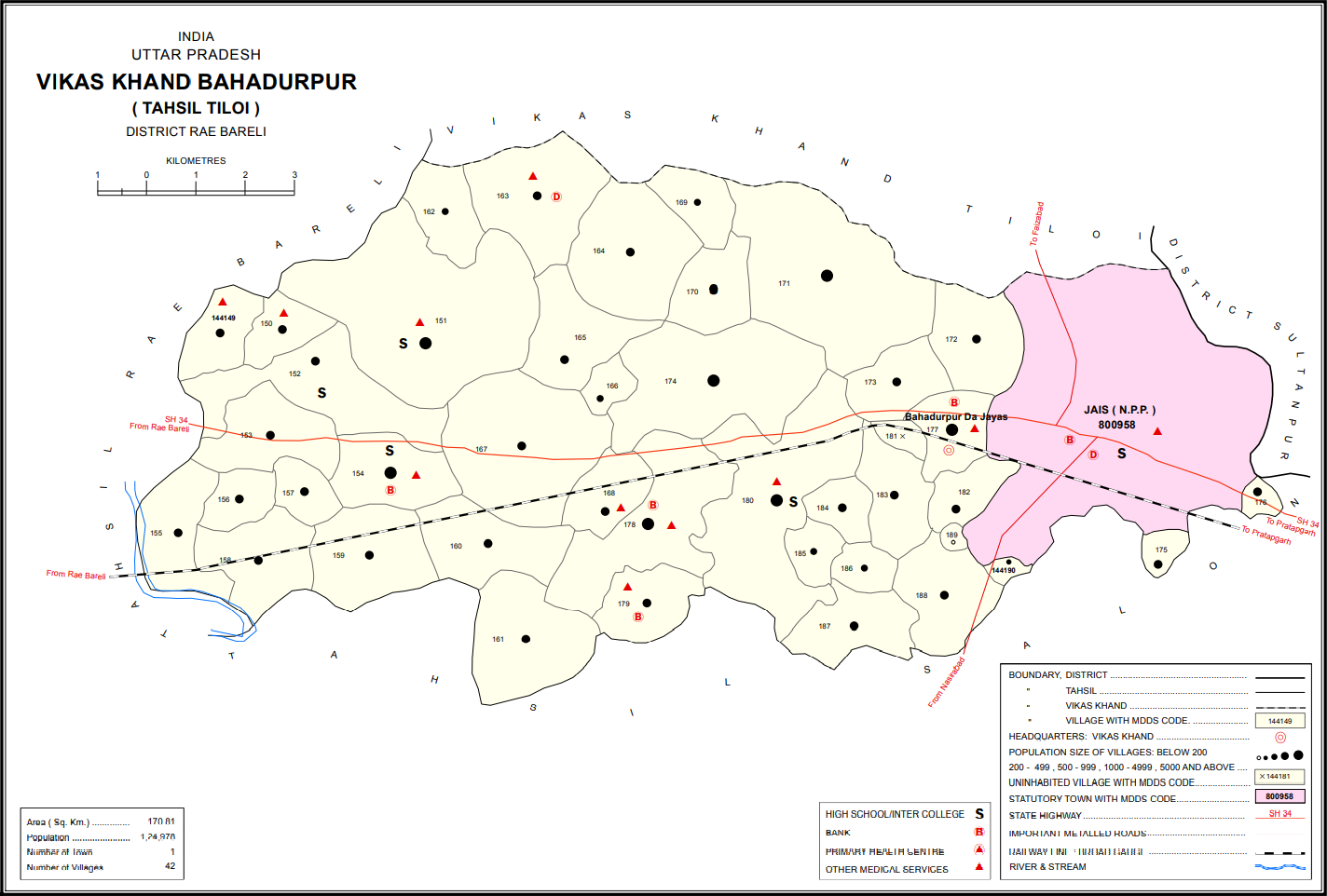
- Map showing Tarauna (#157) in Bahadurpur CD block

- Location in Uttar Pradesh, India
- Coordinates: 26.251334°N 81.38291°E
- Country India: India
- State: Uttar Pradesh
- District: Raebareli

Area
  - Total: 1.436 km^{2} (0.554 sq mi)

Population (2011)
  - Total: 1,077
  - Density: 750.0/km^{2} (1,942/sq mi)

Languages
  - Official: Hindi
- Time zone: UTC+5:30 (IST)
- PIN: 229308
- Vehicle registration: UP-35

Tarauna is a village in Bahadurpur block of Rae Bareli district, Uttar Pradesh, India. As of 2011, its population is 1,077, in 194 households. It has one primary school and no healthcare facilities.

The 1961 census recorded Tarauna as comprising 5 hamlets, with a total population of 499 people (252 male and 247 female), in 101 households and 101 physical houses. The area of the village was given as 363 acres.

The 1981 census recorded Tarauna as having a population of 730 people, in 164 households, and having an area of 143.67 hectares.
