= Karahara =

- Village
- Location in Uttar Pradesh, India Karahara (India)
- Coordinates: 27°06′21.38″N 77°50′54.87″E
- Country: India
- State: Uttar Pradesh
- District: Agra
- Time zone: UTC+5:30 (IST)

Karahara is a village in Agra, in the Indian state of Uttar Pradesh.

== Location ==
This village is 8 km (5 mi) from NH-11 Agra, Jaipur Highway. Fatehpur Sikari is 21 km (13 mi) from Karahara. Seven communities make up the village. It is surrounded by Dalsa Ka Nagla, Sagunapur, Dabla, Dabli Akhwai, Aladdin, and other villages.

There is a traditional system of haath on Monday and Thursday in which people get fresh vegetables. Karahara has small shops selling kirana and fertilizer. The State Bank of India provides financial services. A government hospital is located there.

The population is 10,000. The people speak Hindi and Urdu.

The main crop is wheat.

The village has primary schools, Junior Highschool, Intermediate college and a private degree college affiliated to Bhim Rao Ambedkar University. Present Pradhan Of Village is Mr. Cheetar singh jatav Pin code of karahara 283105.
