= Shahbazpur, Bihar =

Village in Bihar, India

Coordinates: 26.3080°N 87.2880°E

Shahbazpur, also known as Khurd-Dhanpura, is a village located in Araria district of the Indian state of Bihar. This village is located near the border of India and Nepal.

== Location ==
This village is located nearly 30 kilometres (19 mi) north west of Araria town and 3 kilometres (1.9 mi) from Forbesganj. The international border at Jogbani is 10 kilometres (6.2 mi) from the village.

== People ==
The majority of people living here are Hindus, mostly Maithil Brahmans (mool Pagulwar) and Yadavs. The main occupation is agriculture as the area is highly fertile. The population of the village is around 7000. There is nearly 90% literacy rate among Brahmans. It is significantly less in other castes. There is a minority Muslim population.

== The organisation ==
Village has a main tola, i.e., the Brahman tola. The yadavs live south to them and there is another Tola to the north of the main settlement. This Village has a total of 7 big ponds and many smaller ponds. The river Parman, a tributary to the River Fulhar, flows nearby.

== Connectivity ==
The village is directly connected to NH-54 via a metaled road. The nearest town is Forbesganj, once a thriving jute producing town. The nearest airport is Bagdogra which is almost 150 km (3.5 hour) from the village.

== Religion ==
The main and thriving religion of the village is Hinduism with a Muslim minority. This village is claimed to be one of the Shakti peethas (places where body parts of Mata Sati's burnt body fell) by the local people. Mata Chhinnamastika is the village deity. A big temple is currently under construction in the village. There is one mosque in the village.
