= Husmukh Bhikha =

New Zealand field hockey player (born 1958)

Husmukh Bhikha (born 28 April 1958 in Wellington) is a male former field hockey player from New Zealand, who was a member of the national team that finished seventh at the 1984 Summer Olympics in Los Angeles.
