= Naranga =

Scientific classification
- Domain: Eukaryota
- Kingdom: Animalia
- Phylum: Arthropoda
- Class: Insecta
- Order: Lepidoptera
- Superfamily: Noctuoidea
- Family: Noctuidae
- Subfamily: Eustrotiinae
- Genus: Naranga

Genus of moths

Naranga is a genus of moths of the family Noctuidae.

== Description ==
Palpi with second joint reaching above vertex of head and smoothly scaled, and third joint minute. Antennae somewhat thickened, annulate and minutely ciliated in male. Thorax and abdomen tuftless. Forewings with stalked 7, 8, 9 veins. Hindwings with veins 3 and 4 from cell or on a short stalk.

== Species ==
- Naranga aenescens Moore, 1881
- Naranga brunnea Hampson, 1910
- Naranga diffusa Walker, 1865
