= Moti Babu Institute of Technology =

Engineering college in Bihar

Moti Babu Institute of Technology, Forbesganj
- Type: Private
- Established: 2013
- Affiliations: Aryabhatta Knowledge University
- Chairman: Amit Kumar Das
- Chancellor: Dr. J. S. Dhaliwal
- Vice-Chancellor: Dr. H. S. Batth
- Principal: Prof.Dhrub Yadav
- Faculty: 25
- Administrative staff: 80
- Undergraduates: 150
- Location: (India) Araria district, Bihar, India near Nepal
- Campus: Rural
- Nicknames: MBIT, Forbesganj
- Website: www.mbit.in

Moti Babu Institute of Technology is a private engineering college in Araria, Bihar. MBIT was established with a view to impart technical and professional education in the periphery of Forbesganj in Araria district. MBIT is situated in an area of 18 acres in the Rampur village, Araria district and is 300 km from Patna. It is near to Nepal's second largest city Biratnagar (10 km). Bihar Industrial Area Development Authority (BIADA) was instrumental in allotting land in Araria district. Inaugurated on 22 July 2013, MBIT is affiliated with Aryabhatta Knowledge University, Patna. Moti Babu Institute of Technology is the brainchild of Amit Kumar Das, a NRI billionaire from Bihar, who currently resides in Sydney, Australia. A number of national and international agencies have been instrumental in assisting MBIT to create an academic alliance with TAFE, South Australia. MBIT foundation stone was laid in 2010. MBIT was named after Amit Kumar Das’ father, Moti Lal Das, lovingly called 'Moti Babu'.

== Admission ==
The admission procedure for different courses is as prescribed by the Government of Bihar and Aryabhatta Knowledge University, Patna, Bihar.

=== Courses offered ===
MBIT offers B.Tech. courses in following streams with 300 seats (60 seats in each of 5 streams).

- Computer Science and Engineering - 60
- Electronics and Communications Engineering - 60
- Mechanical engineering - 60
- Civil engineering - 60
- Electrical engineering - 60

== See also ==
- Aryabhatta Knowledge University
- Education in Bihar
- Nitish Kumar
- Forbesganj
