= Ukhwa, Bihar =

- village
- Location in Bihar, India Ukhwa, Bihar (India)
- Coordinates: 26.076047°N 87.593020°E
- Country: India
- State: Bihar
- District: Araria

Languages
  - Official: Hindi, Urdu
- Time zone: UTC+5:30 (IST)
- Vehicle registration: BR-

Ukhwa is a village located in Araria district of Indian state of Bihar.
