= Siswa, Purnia =

Siswa
- Village
- Interactive map of Siswa
- Country: India
- State: Bihar
- District: Purnia
- Subdistrict: Krityanand Nagar

Population (2011)
  - Total: 422
- Time zone: UTC+05:30 (IST)
- Telephone code: 06454
- ISO 3166 code: IN-BR

Siswa is a village in Krityanand Nagar block, Purnia district, Bihar, India. The population was 422 at the 2011 Indian census.
