= Tope Nawabganj =

Tope Nawabganj, Bihar
- village
- Location in Bihar, India Tope Nawabganj, Bihar (India)
- Coordinates: 26.380156°N 87.128515°E
- Country: India
- State: Bihar
- District: Araria

Languages
  - Official: Hindi, urdu
- Time zone: UTC+5:30 (IST)
- Vehicle registration: BR-

Tope Nawabganj is an Indian village in Araria district, Bihar.
