= Dogachhi =

- City
- Location in West Bengal, India Dogachhi (India)
- Coordinates: 24.367430°N 88.136450°E
- Country: India
- State: West Bengal
- District: Murshidabad
- Established: 1874

Government
  - Type: Government of India
- Elevation: 35 m (115 ft)

Population (2011)
  - Total: 2,562

Languages
  - Official: Bengali, English
- Time zone: UTC+5:30 (IST)
- PIN: 742237 (Dogachhi)
- Telephone/STD code: 03842
- Lok Sabha constituency: Jangipur
- Vidhan Sabha constituency: Sagardighi
- Website: murshidabad.gov.in

Dogachhi (also spelled Dogachhi) is a village and in Manigram gram panchayat in Sagardighi CD Block in Jangipur subdivision of Murshidabad district in the state of West Bengal, India.

== Geography ==
Cities, towns and locations in the southern portion of Jangipur subdivision, Murshidabad district (including Suti I, Raghunathganj I, Raghunathganj II, Sagardighi CD blocks)
M: municipal town, CT: census town, R: rural/ urban centre, F: Facility
Abbreviation- TPS: Thermal Power Station, AMU: Aligarh Muslim University
Owing to space constraints in the small map, the actual locations in a larger map may vary slightly

=== Location ===
Dogachhi is located at 24.2200°N 88.0111°E.

Villages Dogachhi in Monigram gram panchayat are: Arazi Balarambati, Balarambati, Bhumihar, Chandpara, Dogachhi, Harirampur, Hatpara, Kantanagar, Karala, Kherur, Kismatgadi and Manigram.

=== Area overview ===
Jangipur subdivision is crowded with 52 census towns and as such it had to be presented in two location maps. One of the maps can be seen alongside. The subdivision is located in the Rarh region that is spread over from adjoining Santhal Pargana division of Jharkhand. The land is slightly higher in altitude than the surrounding plains and is gently undulating. The river Ganges, along with its distributaries, is prominent in both the maps. At the head of the subdivision is the 2,245 m long Farakka Barrage, one of the largest projects of its kind in the country. Murshidabad district shares with Bangladesh a porous international border which is notoriously crime prone (partly shown in this map). The subdivision has two large power plants - the 2,100 MW Farakka Super Thermal Power Station and the 1,600 MW Sagardighi Thermal Power Station. According to a 2016 report, there are around 1,000,000 (1 million/ ten lakh) workers engaged in the beedi industry in Jangipur subdivision. 90% are home-based and 70% of the home-based workers are women. As of 2013, an estimated 2.4 million people reside along the banks of the Ganges alone in Murshidabad district. Severe erosion occurs along the banks.

Note: The two maps present some of the notable locations in the subdivision. All places marked in the maps are linked in the larger full screen maps.

== Demographics ==
As per the 2011 Census of India, Dogachhi had a total population of 2,565, of which 1,297 (50%) were males and 1,271 (49%) were females. There are about 538 houses in Dogachhi village.

== Economy ==
=== Sagardighi Thermal Power Station ===
The Sagardighi Thermal Power Station of West Bengal Power Development Corporation, at Manigram, initially had a capacity of 2 x 300 MW, commissioned in 2008. It was subsequently expanded by 2 x 500 MW. The expansion units were commissioned in 2015 and 2017

== Transport ==
Manigram is a station on the Barharwa-Azimganj-Katwa loop line.

== Education ==
Sagardighi Teachers’ Training College was established at Manigram in 2009. Affiliated with the University of Kalyani, it offers B Ed and D El Ed courses.

Dogachhi Junior High School at Dogachhi was established in 2008 at Dogachhi. It is a Bengali medium coeducational school teaching from class VI to XII.

Sagardighi Thermal Power School was established at Manigram in 2009. It is a coeducation institution with Bengali and English medium. It has classes from V to XII.

Don Bosco English Medium School Monigram was established at Manigram in 2005.
