= Siswa, Araria =

Siswa
- Village
- Country: India
- State: Bihar
- District: Araria
- Subdistrict: Jokihat

Population (2011)
  - Total: 1,835
- Time zone: UTC+05:30 (IST)
- ISO 3166 code: IN-BR

Siswa is a village in Araria district, Bihar, India. The population was 1,835 at the 2011 Indian census.

== Education ==
UMS Siswa School, a coeducational primary school, is located in Siswa.

== See also ==
- List of villages in Araria district
