= Musapur =

- Village
- Location in Punjab, India Musapur (India)
- Coordinates: 31°8′4.27″N 76°2′40.03″E
- State: Punjab
- District: Shaheed Bhagat Singh Nagar district

Languages
  - Official: Punjabi
- Time zone: UTC+5:30 (IST)
- PIN: 144513
- Area code: 01823
- Vehicle registration: PB-32
- Website: www.musapur.space

Musapur is an agricultural village in the Shaheed Bhagat Singh Nagar district of Punjab in India.
