= Balua, Ghazipur =

Balua, Ghazipur Balua - Tapa Shahpur
- Village
- Location in Uttar Pradesh, India Balua, Ghazipur (India)
- Coordinates: 25.541°N 83.850°E
- Country: India
- State: Uttar Pradesh
- District: Ghazipur
- Talukas: Mohammadabad

Government
  - Body: Gram panchayat
  - Gram Pradhan: Ramlal Prajapati

Population (2011)
  - Total: 1,054

Languages
  - Official: Hindi
  - Other: Bhojpuri, Hindi
- Time zone: UTC+5:30 (IST)
- PIN: 23 32 31
- Telephone code: 0548
- Vehicle registration: UP
- Sex ratio: 1.99 : 1 ♂/♀
- Distance from Buxar: 58 kilometres (36 mi)
- Police Station: Bhanwarkol
- Post Office: Tarawan
- Website: up.gov.in

Balua - Tapa Shahpur or commonly known as Balua is a small village located on the north bank of river Ganges, near Birpur in Ghazipur district, Uttar Pradesh. The village is mainly a farmland with a small set of population. It is well connected to the NH 19.

== Demographics ==
Most of the population of the village consists of farmers. The total population is 1054 of which around 702 are males and 352 are females. The principal religion followed is Hinduism as can be seen from very few Muslims in the village. A majority of the population are scheduled castes, which live in the southern side of the village.

== Culture ==
=== Temples ===
The village has numerous temples and a mosque.
