= Sisauna =

Village in Bihar, India

Coordinates: 26.13487°N 87.61473°E

Sisauna is a village in Jokihat, Araria district of Bihar, India, with a population of 6,149 in 2011. It comes under Jokihat Vidhan Sabha. Mohammed Taslimuddin belonged from Sisauna and his younger son Mohammed Shahnawaz Alam also lives in Sisauna. Sisauna has one Government Middle school.
