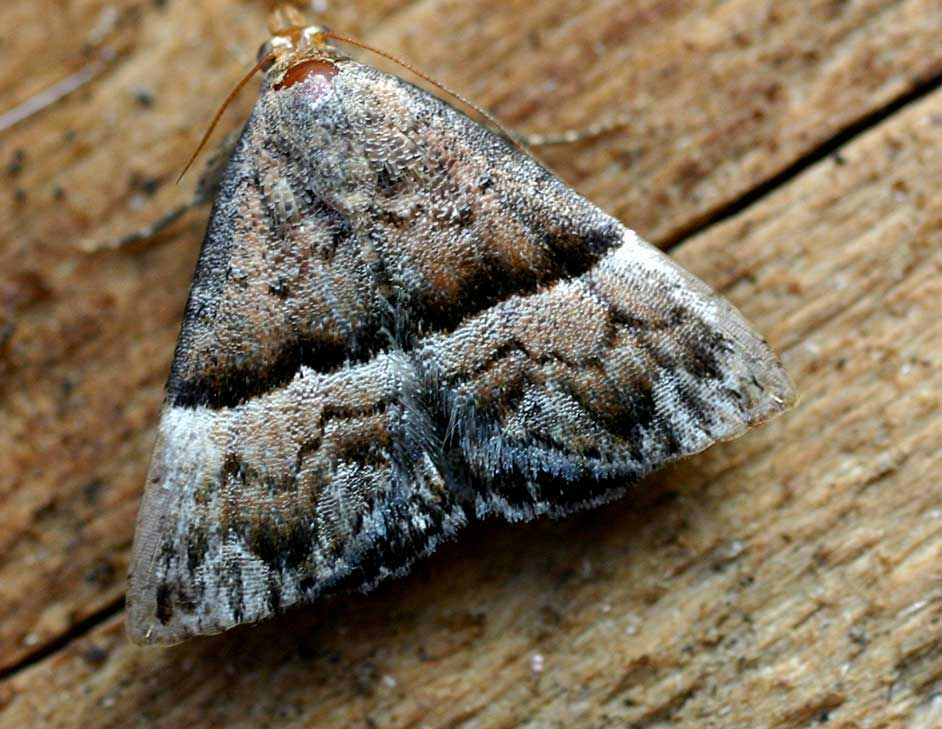

Scientific classification
- Domain: Eukaryota
- Kingdom: Animalia
- Phylum: Arthropoda
- Class: Insecta
- Order: Lepidoptera
- Superfamily: Noctuoidea
- Family: Erebidae
- Genus: Odice
- Species: O. jucunda

Binomial name
- Odice jucunda (Hübner, 1813)

Synonyms
- Ecthetis jucunda; Eublemma jucunda

= Odice jucunda =

Species of moth

Odice jucunda, the delightful marbled, is a species of moth of the family Erebidae. It is found on the Iberian Peninsula and the southern France.
