= Gopipur =

- Village

Languages
  - Official: Hindi
- Time zone: UTC+5:30 (IST)

Gopipur is a village in Suriyawan block Bhadohi district in the Indian state of Uttar Pradesh.

== Geography ==
It situated at bank of Varuna River. Main occupation of people here is agriculture.
