= Tamganj, Bihar =

- village
- Location in Bihar, India Tamganj, Bihar (India)
- Coordinates: 26.239527°N 87.155647°E
- Country: India
- State: Bihar
- District: Araria

Languages
  - Official: Hindi, Urdu
- Time zone: UTC+5:30 (IST)
- Vehicle registration: BR-

Tamganj is an Indian village in Araria district, Bihar.
