= Bariarpur Urf Bazidpur =

Village in Bihar, India

- Village
- Location within Bihar Location within India
- Coordinates: 26°17′58″N 85°10′22″E
- Country: India
- State: Bihar
- District: Muzaffarpur
- Block: Baruraj (Motipur)
- Near City: Mehsi

Government
  - Type: Village Panchayat

Area
  - Total: 33.15 km^{2} (12.80 sq mi)
- Elevation: 60 m (200 ft)

Population (2011)
  - Total: 42,775
  - Density: 1,290/km^{2} (3,342/sq mi)

Languages
  - Official: Hindi, Maithili
- Time zone: UTC+5:30 (IST)
- PIN: 843102
- STD code: 0621
- Vehicle registration: BR-06

'Bariarpur Urf Bazidpur is a village in Baruraj (Motipur) Block, Muzaffarpur District, Bihar, India. It is located on the northern edge of the district, about 29 kilometres northwest of the district seat Muzaffarpur, and 7 kilometres northeast of the block seat Baruraj. The village is situated near Mehsi, a prominent town and commercial centre of the surrounding region, which serves as an important market and service centre for nearby rural areas. In 2011, there are a total of 42,775 inhabitants within the village.

== Tourism and Ecology ==
=== Bhimalpur Forest & Biodiversity Park ===
Located approximately 7 km from the Mehsi Town along the Burhi Gandak River, the Bhimalpur Forest has been successfully developed into a prominent eco-tourism destination. Spanning over 302 acres, this man-made forest originated through the "Jal Jeevan Haryali Mission" and "Didi Ki Paudhshala" community initiatives.

The Government of Bihar is actively upgrading the site into the Gandak Biodiversity Park, featuring modern tourist attractions including:

- A scenic Hanging Bridge over the Burhi Gandak river.
- River boating, nature trails, and a dedicated 'Butterfly Park and Nakshatra Van.
- A natural sanctuary harboring local wildlife such as nilgais, and diverse bird species.

== Geography ==
Bariarpur Urf Bazidpur is located on the south of the Burhi Gandak River. The National Highway 27 passes through the south of the village. It is located near the town of Mehsi, which is an important urban and commercial centre of the surrounding region. The village covers an area of 3315 hectares.

== Demographics ==
According to the 2011 Indian Census, Bariarpur Urf Bazidpur has 8,681 households. Among the 42,775 inhabitants, 22,730 are male and 20,045 are female. The overall literacy rate is 42.11%, with 11,232 of the male population and 6,781 of the female population being literate. The census location code of the village is 228145.
