= Harpur Kalan =

Coordinates: 25°57′N 87°10′E

- Village
- Interactive map of Harpur Kalan
- Country: India
- State: Bihar
- District: Sitamarhi
- Block: Majorganj

Population (2011)
  - Total: 5,510
- ISO 3166 code: IN-BR

Harpur Kalan is a small village of 1269 families located in Majorganj, Sitamarhi, Bihar, India. The Harpur Kalan village has a population of 5510 of which 2990 are males while 2520 are females as per Population Census 2011. In Harpur Kalan village the population of children between the ages of 0-6 is 1027, which makes up 18.64% of the total population. The average sex ratio of Harpur Kalan village is 843, lower than the Bihar state average of 918. The child sex ratio for Harpur Kalan as per census is 824, lower than the Bihar average of 935.

Harpur Kalan village has a lower literacy rate compared to Bihar. In 2011, the literacy rate of Harpur Kalan village was 61.77% compared to 61.80% of Bihar. In Harpur Kalan Male literacy stands at 69.92% while the female literacy rate was 52.14%.

As per the Constitution of India and Panchyati Raaj Act, Harpur Kalan village is administrated by a Sarpanch (Head of Village) who is an elected representative of the village. In Harpur Kalan village out of the total population, 1838 were employed, of these 63.82% of workers describe their work as "main work" (employment or earning more than 6 months) while 36.18% were involved in "marginal activities" providing livelihood for less than 6 months. Of 1838 workers engaged in main work, 427 were cultivators (owner or co-owner) while 610 were agricultural labourers.
