= Nathpur =

- Village
- Country: India
- State: Punjab
- District: Gurdaspur
- Tehsil: Batala
- Region: Majha

Government
  - Type: Panchayat raj
  - Body: Gram panchayat

Area
  - Total: 159 ha (390 acres)

Population (2011)
  - Total: 2,025; 1,089/936 ♂/♀
  - Scheduled Castes: 1,217; 654/563 ♂/♀
  - Total Households: 380

Languages
  - Official: Punjabi
- Time zone: UTC+5:30 (IST)
- Telephone: 01871
- ISO 3166 code: IN-PB
- Vehicle registration: PB-18
- Website: gurdaspur.nic.in

Nathpur is a village in Batala in Gurdaspur district of Punjab State, India. It is located 18 kilometres (11 mi) from sub district headquarter, 27 kilometres (17 mi) from district headquarter and 2 kilometres (1.2 mi) from Sri Hargobindpur. The village is administrated by Sarpanch an elected representative of the village.

== Demography ==
As of 2011, the village has a total number of 380 houses and a population of 2025 of which 1089 are males while 936 are females. According to the report published by Census India in 2011, out of the total population of the village 1217 people are from Schedule Caste and the village does not have any Schedule Tribe population so far.

== See also ==
- List of villages in India
