= Thengpur Pipra =

- village
- Location in Bihar, India Thengpur Pipra (India)
- Coordinates: 26.345172°N 87.486187°E
- Country: India
- State: Bihar
- District: Araria

Languages
  - Official: Hindi, urdu
- Time zone: UTC+5:30 (IST)
- Vehicle registration: BR-

Thengpur Pipra is an Indian village in Araria district, Bihar.
