= Turkaili, Bihar =

- village
- Location in Bihar, India Turkaili, Bihar (India)
- Coordinates: 26.113938°N 87.527022°E
- Country: India
- State: Bihar
- District: Araria

Languages
  - Official: Hindi, urdu
- Time zone: UTC+5:30 (IST)
- Vehicle registration: BR-

Turkaili is an Indian village in Araria district, Bihar State.
