= Rhypagla =

Scientific classification
- Kingdom: Animalia
- Phylum: Arthropoda
- Clade: Pancrustacea
- Class: Insecta
- Order: Lepidoptera
- Superfamily: Noctuoidea
- Family: Erebidae
- Genus: Rhypagla; Nye, 1975
- Species: R. lacernaria

Binomial name
- Rhypagla lacernaria Hübner, [1813]

Genus of moths

Rhypagla is a monotypic genus of moths in the family Erebidae erected by Ian W. B. Nye in 1975. Its only species, Rhypagla lacernaria, was first described by Jacob Hübner in 1813. It is found in northern Africa, southern Europe, Cyprus, Transcaucasia, the Middle East and Iran.

== Taxonomy ==
The genus has previously been classified in the subfamily Eublemminae of Erebidae or the subfamily Eustrotiinae of the family Noctuidae.
