= Siswanto (serial killer) =

Indonesian serial killer (1963–2007)

- Born: Siswanto; 1963; Indonesia
- Died: 26 March 2007 (aged 43–44); Nusa Kambangan, Indonesia
- Other name: Robot Gedek
- Conviction: Murder
- Penalty: Death

Details
- Victims: 12
- Span of crimes: December 1994 – 1996
- Country: Indonesia
- Date apprehended: 6 August 1996

Siswanto (1963 – 26 March 2007), also known as Robot Gedek, was an Indonesian serial killer who killed and mutilated twelve boys.

== Biography ==
Siswanto was born in 1963 in Indonesia. He was homeless during his crimes.

Siswanto sexually molested and killed 12 boys, aged 9 to 15, from December 1994 to when the last body was found on 5 July 1996. Police reported that he had slashed open the stomachs of all his victims, with most being found naked. He also told police that he enjoyed drinking his victims' blood and kept pieces of their skin.

On 6 August 1996, Siswanto confessed to 8 murders in Jakarta, and 2 in Pekalongan in Central Java.

Siswanto was sentenced to death for 12 murders on 21 May 1997. Serial killer Baekuni, who also sexually molested, murdered, and mutilated young boys, was suggested to have been a key witness in Siswanto's trial. He died in prison of cardiac arrest on 26 March 2007 at the Nusakambangan prison on Nusa Kambangan Island. Judge Sartono of the Central Jakarta State Court said Siswanto's "crimes sent shock waves through the community because he sadistically killed underage boys. What he did can never be forgiven."
