= Gunwanti, Bihar =

- village
- Location in Bihar, India Gunwanti, Bihar (India)
- Coordinates: 26.060769°N 87.325017°E
- Country: India
- State: Bihar
- District: Araria

Languages
  - Official: Hindi, Urdu
- Time zone: UTC+5:30 (IST)
- Vehicle registration: BR-

Gunwanti is an Indian village located in Raniganj Block of Araria District, Bihar.
