= Parmanpur =

Village in Uttar Pradesh, India

Parmanpur is a place in Mirzapur district, near Kollapur, in Uttar Pradesh state in northern India.
