= Shaikhda =

Muslim community in india

The Shaikhda or Shaikhra are a Muslim community found in the states of Gujarat and Bihar in India.

== Present circumstances ==
The community is found mainly in Ahmedabad and Baroda districts and Purnea and Kishanganj districts . They have abandoned many of their syncretic practices, and are now fairly orthodox Sunni Muslims. The Shaikhda are mainly an urban community, and many are now petty traders. They are endogamous, marrying close kin.
