= Gaiyari =

Village in Bihar, India

Coordinates: 26.105°N 87.475°E

Gaiyari is a village and panchayat in Araria district in Bihar.
