= Bardaha =

- Village
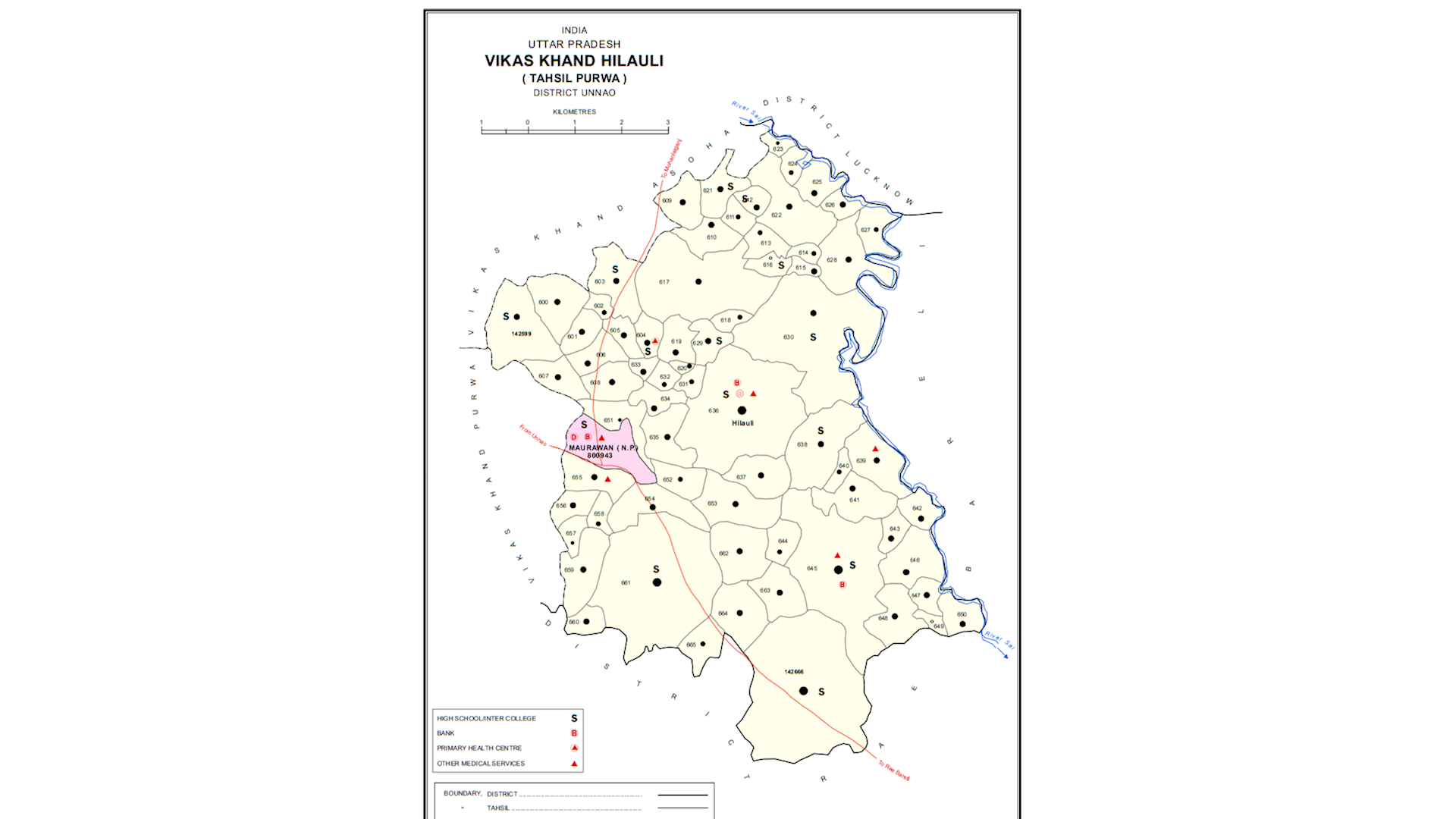
- Map showing Bardaha (#637) in Hilauli CD block

- Location in Uttar Pradesh, India
- Coordinates: 26.424733°N 80.952706°E
- Country India: India
- State: Uttar Pradesh
- District: Unnao

Area
  - Total: 4.595 km^{2} (1.774 sq mi)

Population (2011)
  - Total: 2,529
  - Density: 550.4/km^{2} (1,425/sq mi)

Languages
  - Official: Hindi
- Time zone: UTC+5:30 (IST)
- Vehicle registration: UP-35

Bardaha is a village in Hilauli block of Unnao district, Uttar Pradesh, India. As of 2011, its population is 2,529, in 469 households, and it has one primary school and no healthcare facilities.

The 1961 census recorded Bardaha as comprising 5 hamlets, with a total population of 1,086 (556 male and 530 female), in 210 households and 152 physical houses. The area of the village was given as 1,183 acres.
