= Tharia Bakia =

- village
- Location in Bihar, India Tharia Bakia (India)
- Coordinates: 26.168000°N 87.391879°E
- Country: India
- State: Bihar
- District: Araria

Languages
  - Official: Hindi, urdu
- Time zone: UTC+5:30 (IST)
- Vehicle registration: BR-

Tharia Bakia is an Indian village in Araria district, Bihar.
