= Kursail =

Village in Bihar, India

Coordinates: 20°01′N 81°08′E

Kursail is a small village inhibited on the shore of river Bakara under Araria district in the Indian state of Bihar. It has two middle schools and two primary schools.

== Culture ==
=== Language ===
Hindi and Urdu are the main languages of the people of Kursail, however some people speak Maithili as well.

=== Cuisine ===
The main food is rice (boiled) and roti (flatbread) with dal (Pulses) and locally available vegetables (cabbages, gourds, pumpkins, lady's finger etc.). Dahi (curd), cheura (flattened rice) are also very popular among people. People are fond of non-vegetarian food as well. Kursail being near to Bakra river and lake Futung, fishes are readily available. Even people has their own ponds to culture fish. In sweet dishes jalebis and rasgullas, laddu and pedas are very much liked by people.

=== Festivals ===
Eid, Chhatt Pooja, Durga Pooja, Kali Pooja, Lakshami Pooja, Muharram are the main festivals of residents of Kursail. All festivals are celebrated by both Hindu and Muslim communities without any discrimination.

== Population ==
The population of Kursail is approximately two thousand.

== Nearest railway station ==
- Araria Court
- Kishanganj

== Nearest Airport ==
- Bagdogra International Airport

== Nearest national highways ==
NH-57(15 km approx), NH 31 (30 km approx.), NH 34 (32 km approx)
