= Uda, Bihar =

- village
- Location in Bihar, India Uda, Bihar (India)
- Coordinates: 25.783919°N 86.310858°E
- Country: India
- State: Bihar
- District: Araria

Languages
  - Official: Hindi, Urdu
- Time zone: UTC+5:30 (IST)
- Vehicle registration: BR-

Uda is an Indian village located in Darbhanga District of Bihar state.
