= Ajitnagar =

- Village
- Location in Bihar, India
- Coordinates: 26.2392425°N 87.1059586°E
- Country: India
- State: Bihar
- Region: Mithila
- District: Araria
- Post office: Narpatganj

Area
  - Total: 0.78 km^{2} (0.30 sq mi)

Population (2011)
  - Total: 957
  - Density: 1,200/km^{2} (3,200/sq mi)

Languages
  - Local: Maithili
- Time zone: UTC+5:30 (IST)
- PIN: 854335
- Telephone code: 06453
- Location code: 221,531
- Sex ratio: 1.190 ♂/♀
- Literacy rate: 70.92
- Female literacy rate: 66.11
- Male literacy rate: 74.78

Ajitnagar is a village located in the Araria district of the state of Bihar in India. According to the 2011 Indian census, the village has a total population of 957. The literacy rate at the village is relatively high and stand at 70.92%. The village is led by an elected Sarpanch.
