= Thēthi =

Maithili dialect of India and Nepal

- ठेठी मैथिली • Thethi Maithili
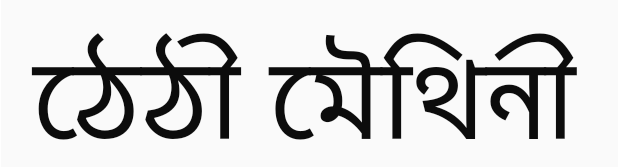
- The name of Thēthi written in Tirhuta
- Native to: India, Nepal
- Region: Mithila
- Ethnicity: Maithils
- Native speakers: 1,65,420
- Language family: Indo-European: Indo-Iranian; Indo-Aryan; Eastern; Maithili; Thēthi

Language codes
- ISO 639-3: –
- Glottolog: tati1242 Tati (Maithili)

Thēthi, also known as Koshi Maithili, is a Maithili dialect, mainly spoken in the Mithila region of Nepal and India. It is spoken mainly in Koshi division of India (Begusarai, Samastipur, Khagaria and Lakhisarai districts of Bihar) and in Koshi Province of Nepal. It has 165,000 speakers in India according to the 2011 census.

== Distinction from Central Maithili ==
In the Eastern Indo-Aryan languages—Bangla, Maithili, Assamese, and Oriya—The vowel অ underwent a historical shift to [ɔ] (a rounded “aw/o” sound, like in English off). Linguists explain this as the Eastern Indo-Aryan vowel shift, likely caused by substrate influence from pre-Indo-Aryan languages in Bengal and Mithila that lacked [ə], along with the natural tendency for [ə] to drift into a clearer [ɔ] in rapid speech. As a result, speakers of Thēthi Maithili pronounce অ as “O” like, while Hindi and related languages kept it as “A/uh.

Name (Spelling) Maithili Pronunciation

Amit → pronounced Omit [ɔmit]

Ajay → pronounced Ojoy [ɔdʒɔj]

Amar → pronounced Omar [ɔmər]

Jay → pronounced Joy [dʒɔj]

Speakers of Central Maithili (Darbhanga–Madhubani belt) often describe Thēthi as a plainer or rougher form and also the purest form of Maithili. Linguistically, Thēthi retains the core features of Maithili, including its Indo-Aryan roots derived from Magadhi Apabhramsha through Abahattha. However, it exhibits unique phonetic and lexical traits. For instance, Thethi tends to preserve traditional Maithili phonetic links but may show variations in pronunciation and vocabulary influenced by its geographic proximity to other regional languages like Bengali. For example, the phrase (it was done) will be pronounced as bha gēlaī in Central Maithili. Whereas, in Thēthi, it will be pronounced as bhæy gēlaī.

Some of the verb forms that are used in Central Maithili are also dropped in Thēthi. For example, instead of (Achhi/Aichh, meaning 'is'), a more colloquial variant (Chhai/Chhiyai) is preferred.
