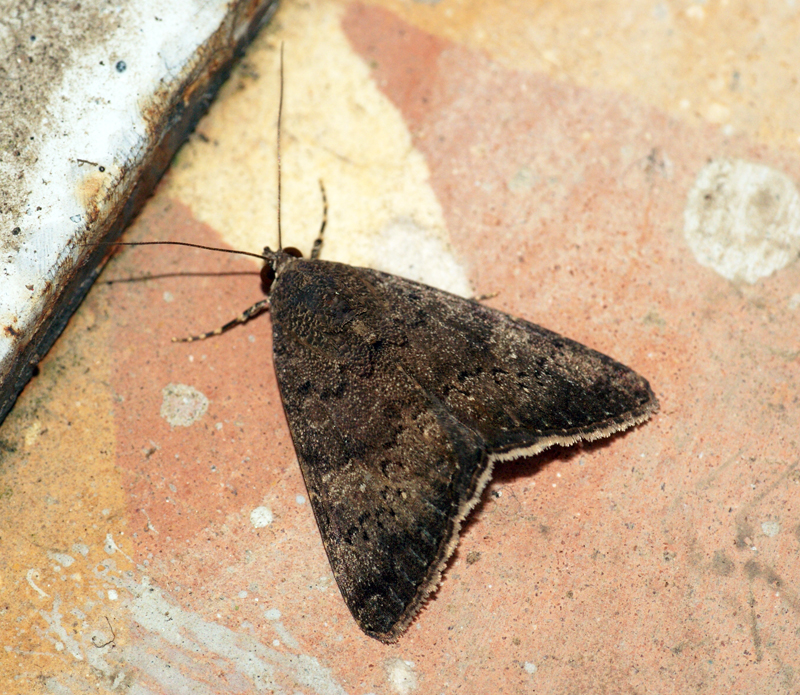
- Amyna punctum

Scientific classification
- Kingdom: Animalia
- Phylum: Arthropoda
- Class: Insecta
- Order: Lepidoptera
- Superfamily: Noctuoidea
- Family: Noctuidae
- Subfamily: Eustrotiinae; Grote, 1882

Genera
- Amyna; Autoba; Catoblemma; Enispa; Eublemma; Eumicremma; Eustrotia; Gyophora; Lithacodia; Naranga; Polyorycta; Porphyrinia; Pseudozarba; Rhypagla

= Eustrotiinae =

Subfamily of moths

The Eustrotiinae are a subfamily of moths, under family Noctuidae.
