= List of villages in Ghazipur district =

This is an alphabetical list of villages in Ghazipur district, Uttar Pradesh, India.

== A–C ==
- Abhaipur
- Amarupur
- Arangi
- Asaichandpur
- Asawar
- Athahatha
- Awathahi Basant
- Bakainia
- Baksara
- Balua
- Bara
- Basuka
- Bhaksi
- Bhimapar
- Bhurkura
- Birpur
- Chitarkoni

== D–F ==
- Dehriya
- Deorhi
- Deva Village
- Dewaitha
- Dhamupur
- Dumri
- Faridpur, Usia
- Firozpur
- Fufuao

== G–J ==
- Gagran
- Gahmar
- Gaighat
- Gaura
- Gondaur
- Gorasara
- Hasanpura
- Holipur Village
- Jaburna
- Jalalabad
- Jalalpur
- Jangipur
- Jevpur
- Joga Musahib

== K–M ==
- Kabirpur
- Kadirpur
- Kamesaradih
- Kanuan
- Karimuddinpur
- Karmahari
- Khanpur
- Khardiha
- Khizirpur Mathare
- Kudva
- Kundesar
- Lathudih
- Mahali
- Mahend
- Medinipur
- Mircha
- Mirzabad
- Muhammadpur T Chaudhari Azmal

== N–R ==
- Nagsar
- Narsinghpur
- Nawali
- Nirahukapura
- Pakhanpura
- Pakri
- Palia
- Parsa
- Patakaniya
- Phooli
- Raipur
- Rajapur
- Rakasaha
- Reotipur

== S–Z ==
- Sadhopur
- Saraila
- Sarhuja
- Semra
- Sherpur
- Sonwani
- Suhwal
- Sukhdehri
- Sultanpur
- Tajpur Manjha
- Tajpur
- Taraon
- Thanaipur
- Tilwa
- Tiyari
- Tokawa
- Umar Ganj
- Usia
- Usra
- Zabran Pur
- Zahurabad
