= Lathudih, Ghazipur =

Lathudih
- Village
- Location in Uttar Pradesh, India Lathudih (India)
- Coordinates: 25.709539°N 83.883291°E
- District: Ghazipur
- Tehsil: Mohammadabad

Government
  - Type: Panchayati raj (India)
  - Body: Gram panchayat

Languages
  - Official: Hindi
  - Other spoken: Bhojpuri
- Time zone: UTC+5:30 (IST)
- Pin code: 233225
- Telephone code: 05493
- Vehicle registration: UP-61
- Website: up.gov.in

Lathudih is a village located in Mohammadabad tehsil of Ghazipur district of Uttar Pradesh in India. It has total 646 families residing. Lathudih has population of 4,080 as per government records. It is located at a distance of 18 km towards east from tehsil headquarter Mohammadabad and 41 km from district headquarter Ghazipur.The total geographical area of village is approximately 440 hectares.

== Administration ==
Lathudih village is administered by Gram Pradhan through its Gram Panchayat, who is elected representative of village as per constitution of India and Panchyati Raj Act. Lathudih comes under Bhawarkol block.

Particulars	Total	Male	Female
Total No. of Houses	646		
Population	4080	2162	1918

== Nearby places ==
- Karimuddinpur
- Mohammadabad, Ghazipur
- Ghazipur
- Ballia
- Varanasi
- Gondaur
- Parsa, Ghazipur
- Rajapur, Ghazipur
