= Khardiha =

Khardiha Khaira Deeh Kharhiyan
- Village
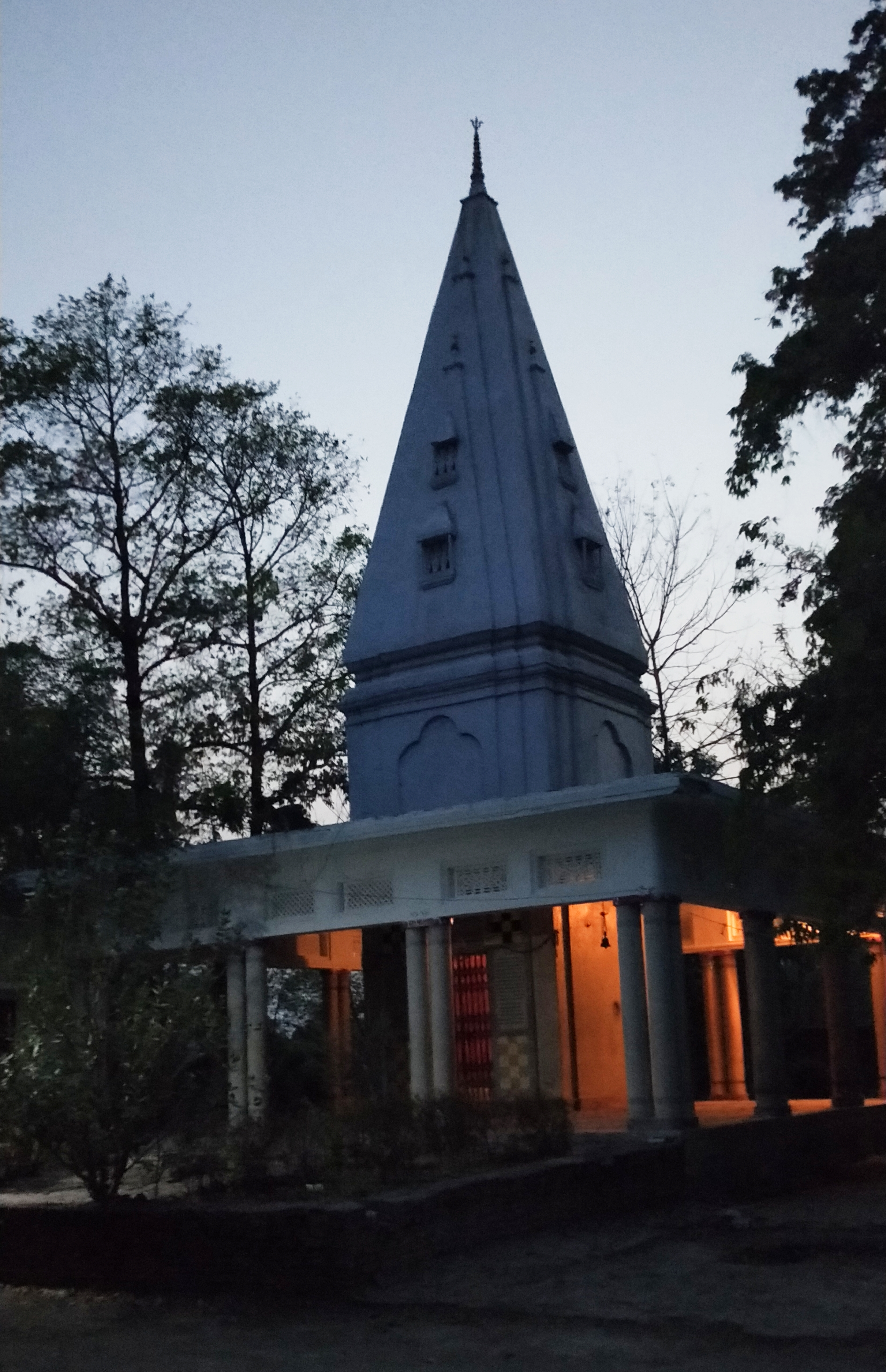

- Location in Uttar Pradesh, India Khardiha (India)
- Coordinates: 25.648769°N 83.884880°E
- Country: India
- State: Uttar Pradesh
- District: Ghazipur

Government
  - Body: Gram panchayat

Population (2011)
  - Total: 1,896

Languages
  - Official: Hindi
- Time zone: UTC+5:30 (IST)
- PIN: 233233
- Telephone code: 05493
- Vehicle registration: UP-61
- Distance from New Delhi: 895 kilometres (556 mi) NW (land)
- Distance from Mumbai: 1,550 kilometres (960 mi) SW (land)
- Distance from Chennai: 1,894 kilometres (1,177 mi) SE (land)
- Distance from Kolkata: 711 kilometres (442 mi) (land)
- Climate: Cfa (Köppen)
- Precipitation: 980 millimetres (39 in)
- Avg. annual temperature: 32.0 °C (89.6 °F)
- Avg. summer temperature: 33.0 °C (91.4 °F)
- Avg. winter temperature: 05 °C (41 °F)

Khardiha is a village in the Karail area of the Mohammadabad tehsil in Ghazipur district, Uttar Pradesh, India. It has population of 1896 as per 2011 Census. It has its own local administration under Panchayati Raj system, with Gram Pradhan as head of local administration. Since the very beginning this village has been an important center of education and cultural activities.

== History ==
In 1541 ce, when Sultan Sher Shah Suri was ruling the country after defeating the Moghul emperor Nasir ud-din Muhammad Humayun in the battle of Chausa, the foundation of village KHAIRA DEEH was laid down by Babu Madhav Rai, elder son of Kunwar Narayan Shah of Kuresar-Naraianpur branch of Mulhan Dikshit family.

Khardiha belongs to Tallukedar Babu Madhav Rai's family. In sixth generation of Babu Madhav Rai's descendant elder brother Babu Ugrasen Rai got the zamindari of Kundesar and younger brother Babu Vikram Rai moved to 'Kharhiyan'. In spite of being a small village compared to the nearby Joga Musahib, Awathahi, Gondaur, Kanuaan, Amarupur and Siyadeeh, Khardiha is considered an important place by neighbouring villages.

== Local administration ==
Before 1995 Kardiha had Musardeva, Shahpura, Gyanpur, Lalapur, Alapur and Navpura village under its panchayat. But now only one village comes under Khardiha panchayat. Khardiha gram sabha had people from every social strata as its Pradhan. List of former Pradhans of this village after independence is mentioned below :

- Late Shivshwaroop Rai
- Late Keshav Prasad Rai
- Late Kapildev Rai
- Late Rajnarain Ram (1983–1988)
- Shri Ramchandra Rai (1988–2006)
- Shrimati Maya Kharwar

Particulars	Total	Male	Female
Total No. of Houses	344		
Population	1,897	1,070	826

== Schools and temples ==
Temples such as Mahavir Ji, Brahma baba shrine, Budhva Shivji and Durgaji are famous. The village has three primary schools, one government added Shri Sarvodaya Inter college and Khardiha Degree College. Late Brij Mangal Rai established both the colleges. There was a time when Khardiha was an education center for neighboring villages. However situation has deteriorated. Khardiha's past glory is faded with the passage of time.

== Transport ==
The village is at a distance of nearly 36 km from Ghazipur city Railway station and UP Roadways Ghazipur depot. Other nearby railway stations are Karimuddinpur, Yusufpur and Buxar railway station. Khardiha can be reached through road transport by mean of private vehicles or rented vehicles, such as buses and Taxies.

== Administration ==
Khardia comes under Bhanwarkol block, and Mohammadabad vidhansabha of Ballia Lok Sabha constituency. Although the Tehsil under which it is administered is Mohammadabad, comes under Ghazipur district.

== Agriculture ==
Agriculture is the main source of income and living for the residents, nearly all type of food grains which are cultivated in eastern UP are also produced here, popular crops include wheat, paddy and potatoes, though other crops such as mustard, lentils, grams are also produced in large quantities, the village has privately owned rice mills and oil mills. Farmers often sell their products either in the local market or in the anaj mandi (government food grains store house) located in yusufpur. Farming is done with semi modern and semi classical techniques, tractors electrical water pumping sets are used for farming but bigger machines like harvesters are also used in the village.

== Language and culture ==
Language spoken by majority in the village is a mix of Bhojpuri and Hindi, though Urdu has also a great influence on it. Culturally the area is much influenced by Varanasi which is a major cultural center nearby.

== Notable people ==
- Indian Independence activist Brij Mangal Rai was born in this village on 14 January 1914.
- Renowned literary figure Viveki Rai started his career in Khardiha Inter College.

== Nearby places ==
- Ghazipur
- Ballia
- Buxar
- Varanasi
- Mughalsarai
- Patna
- Mohammadabad, Ghazipur
- Rajapur, Ghazipur
- Sherpur, Ghazipur
