= Besu River =

River in India

Location
- Country: India
- State: Uttar Pradesh
- District: Ghazipur District

Physical characteristics
- Mouth: Ganges
- Length: 128 km (80 mi)
- Width
  - average: 67 metres (220 ft)

Besu is a river located in Ghazipur District of Uttar Pradesh, India.

Besu river starts from Birpur village located in Ghazipur District. Its mouth is located between Hariharpur and Delawalpur village. Most of the land near to the river is governed by Birpur and Sherpur villages. Sherpur village is located on the banks of the Ganges and the Besu.

== See also ==
- Meghai River
