= Kanuan =

Kanuwan
- Village
- Kanuan
- Location in Uttar Pradesh, India Kanuwan (India)
- Coordinates: 25.595826°N 83.920284°E
- Country: India
- State: Uttar Pradesh
- District: Ghazipur
- Tehsil: Mohammadabad

Government
  - Type: Panchayati raj (India)
  - Body: Gram panchayat

Population (2011)
  - Total: 3,667

Languages
  - Official: Hindi, Bhojpuri
- Time zone: UTC+5:30 (IST)
- Pin code: 233231
- Telephone code: 05493
- Vehicle registration: UP-61
- Website: up.gov.in
- According to historical records, kanuwan was established around 1420 A.D.

Kanuan Also known as kanuwan is a village located in Mohammadabad Assembly constituency tehsil of Ghazipur, Uttar Pradesh. It is situated 45 km from Ghazipur district. It has total 440 families residing. Kanuan has population of 3,112 as per Population Census 2011. As of 2011, Kanuan has a post office with the PIN code 233231, and the village comes under the jurisdiction of the bhawarkol police station.

== Village Speciality ==
The Jai Bajrang Ramlila Committee has been organizing the Ramlila (a folk re-enactment of the life of Lord Rama) in Kanuan village for 50 years.

Current Management and Community Support The Ramlila is currently managed by a core group including Manish Rai, Gopal Rai, Shailesh Rai, Shubham Rai, Avinash Rai, and Pavan Rai, along with several other dedicated workers. The event receives full support from the entire village.

== Dussehra Tradition ==
A significant part of the celebration is the burning of an effigy of Ravana on the day of Dussehra (Vijayadashami).

== History ==
According to historical records, Kanuwan was established around 1420 A.D. It was Kunwar Bhairo Shah who moved from 'Saharmadih' to this place and built a Kot (fort). He was the last person of Raja Mulhan Dikshit's family who left the old habitat of Kinwars near Ooki river. It was a period when sultan Khizr Khan was sitting on the throne of Delhi. Kunwar Bhairav Shah had four sons, Satan Shah, Bisen Shah, Karmsen Shah and Narayan Shah. Elder son Satan Shah established Pidroi, second son Bisen Shah established Amarupur, third son Karmsen Shah established Kanuan and youngest of them Narayan Shah stayed at Gondaur. Kunwar Narayan Shah also had four sons, Madhav Rai, Mahesh Rai, Sarangdhar Rai and Purushottam Rai. Eldest of them Taluqdar Madhav Rai established village Kundesar on the bank of river Ganges, second son Mahesh Rai established Narayanpur on the name of his father Narayan Shah, third son Sarangdhar Rai stayed at Gondaur while youngest Purushottam Rai moved to Musurdeva. Its narrated in 'Shri Pothi Bansauri' in these verses:

Narayen sut chari pratham Madho kahi gayo,
Sur sarita tat gram Kundesari nam kahayo,
Dujo bhaye Mahesh nam jehi param ujagar,
Narayanpur gram base subh gun ke agar,
Teejo Gondaur me base Sarangdhar jo naav,
Chautho Purusotim kahi basev Mushurdev gaav.

(English translation: Narayan Shah had four sons, eldest of them Madhav Rai established village Kundesar on the bank of river Ganges. Second son Mahesh Rai established Narayanpur. Third son Sarangdhar Rai stayed at Gondaur, while fourth and youngest of them Purushottam Rai shifted to chhawani Musurdeva.)

== Population details ==
Total No. of Houses	585	-	-
Population	3,667	1,876	1,791
Child (0-6)	641	324	317
Schedule Caste	387	211	176
Schedule Tribe	0	0	0
Literacy	70.56 %	79.32 %	61.33 %
Total Workers	1,321	905	416
Main Worker	1,053	-	-
Marginal Worker	268	155	113
