= Gondaur =

- Village
- Location in Uttar Pradesh, India Gondaur (India)
- Coordinates: 25.6168558°N 83.7531057°E
- Country: India
- State: Uttar Pradesh
- District: Ghazipur
- Tehsil: Mohammadabadl

Government
  - Type: Panchayati raj (India)
  - Body: Gram panchayat

Languages
  - Official: Hindi
  - Other spoken: Bhojpuri
- Time zone: UTC+5:30 (IST)
- Pin code: 223225
- Telephone code: 05493
- Vehicle registration: UP-61
- Website: up.gov.in

Gondaur is a village located in ‘Karail Kshetra’ of Mohammadabad tehsil of Ghazipur district, Uttar Pradesh. It had 590 families and a population of 3712 in the 2011 census.

== History ==
According to historical records, Gondaur was established around 1420 A.D. It was Kunwar Bhairo Shah who moved from 'Saharmadih' to this place and built a Kot (fort). He was the last person of Raja Mulhan Dikshit's family who left the old habitat of Kinwars near Ooki river. It was a period when sultan Khizr Khan was sitting on the throne of Delhi. Kunwar Bhairav Shah had four sons, Satan Shah, Bisen Shah, Karmsen Shah and Narayan Shah. Elder son Satan Shah established Pidroi, second son Bisen Shah established Amarupur, third son Karmsen Shah established Kanuan and youngest of them Narayan Shah stayed at Gondaur. Kunwar Narayan Shah also had four sons, Madhav Rai, Mahesh Rai, Sarangdhar Rai and Purushottam Rai. Eldest of them Taluqdar Madhav Rai established village Kundesar on the bank of river Ganges, second son Mahesh Rai established Narayanpur on the name of his father Narayan Shah, third son Sarangdhar Rai stayed at Gondaur while youngest Purushottam Rai moved to Musurdeva. Its narrated in 'Shri Pothi Bansauri' in these verses:

Narayen sut chari pratham Madho kahi gayo,
Sur sarita tat gram Kundesari nam kahayo,
Dujo bhaye Mahesh nam jehi param ujagar,
Narayanpur gram base subh gun ke agar,
Teejo Gondaur me base Sarangdhar jo naav,
Chautho Purusotim kahi basev Mushurdev gaav.

(English translation: Narayan Shah had four sons, eldest of them Madhav Rai established village Kundesar on the bank of river Ganges. Second son Mahesh Rai established Narayanpur. Third son Sarangdhar Rai stayed at Gondaur, while fourth and youngest of them Purushottam Rai shifted to chhawani Musurdeva.)

== Administration ==
Gondaur village is administrated by Gram Panchayat through its Pradhan who is elected representative of village.

Particulars	Total	Male	Female
Total No. of Houses	590		
Population	3,712	1,993	1,719

== Agriculture ==
Agriculture is the main source of income and livelihood for the majority of the residents though a number of people from this village have been in government and private sector jobs. Nearly all type of food grains which are cultivated in eastern UP are also produced here, popular crops include wheat, paddy, and potatoes, though other crops such as mustard, lentils, grams are also produced in large quantities, the village has privately owned rice mills and oil mills.

== Transport ==
Gondaur is connected to other parts of Ghazipur through public and private transport. Nearest railway station to this village is Karimuddinpur. Buxar railway station on Delhi-Howrah route is at 12 km distance from this village.

== Hospital and schools ==
There is one Intermediate college in this village along with several primary schools. Allahabad Bank has one of its branch here, which caters the needs of local farmers and other entrepreneurs. Gondaur has got one of Ghazipur district's Block Primary Health Center (BPHC) with 20 beds.

== Language and culture ==
Culturally this village has influence of Kashi Kshetra as this region is part of Varnasi division. The language spoken in this village is Bhojpuri, though a number of people can read, write and speak Hindi and English languages.

== Notable people ==
- Krishnanand Rai, former MLA from Mohammadabad constituency, was born in this village on 11 December 1955
- Alka Rai, MLA from Mohammadabad constituency
- Gyanendra Pandey (historian)
