= Rai (surname) =

Rai is a surname that has been in use since historical times in South Asia. Etymologically, the name is derived from rāya, a term found in Shauraseni Prakrit, which itself is originates from the Sanskrit term rājan. Rai is a linguistic doublet of the Hindi word rājā; both terms share the same meaning, referring to a king or ruler.

== People ==
- A. N. Rai (born 1955), Indian academic administrator
- Aanand L. Rai (born 1971), Indian film director and producer
- Aaron Rai (born 1995), English golfer
- Ade Rai (born 1970), Indonesian bodybuilder
- Agansing Rai (1920–2000), Nepali recipient of the Victoria Cross
- Aishwarya Rai (born 1973), Indian actress and former Miss World
- Ajay Rai, Indian politician
- Ajeet Rai (born 1999), New Zealand tennis player
- Alisha Rai (author), American writer
- Alka Rai, Indian politician
- Amit Rai, Indian film director
- Amrit Rai (c. 1921–1996), Indian writer
- Anand Rai (born 1977), Indian activist
- Asish Rai (born 1999), Indian footballer
- Atul Rai (born 1982), Indian politician
- Babbal Rai (born 1985), Indian Punjab singer
- Baleshwar Rai, Indian politician, former Indian Administrative Service officer
- Bali Rai (born 1971), English young-adult fiction novelist
- Béchara Boutros Raï (born 1940), Maronite Catholic Patriarch of Antioch
- Bina Rai (1931–2009), Indian actress
- Brij Mangal Rai (1914–1998), Indian freedom fighter and politician
- Daroga Prasad Rai (1922–1981), Indian politician
- Dayahang Rai (born 1979), Nepali actor
- Dipak Rai, Nepali footballer
- Gauri Shankar Rai (1924–1991), Indian politician
- Gopal Rai (born 1975), Indian politician
- Gulshan Rai (1924–2004), Indian film producer and distributor
- Guru Har Rai (1630–1661), Sikh guru
- Harivansh Rai Bachchan (1907–2003), Awadhi Poet
- Haqiqat Rai, Sikh martyr
- Himanshu Rai (1892–1940), Indian film pioneer
- I Gusti Ngurah Rai, National Hero of Indonesia
- Indra Bahadur Rai (1927–2018), Indian writer
- Jharkhande Rai (died 1984), Indian politician
- Jitendra Kumar Rai (born 1978), Cabinet Minister Bihar
- Kalpana Rai (1950–2008), Indian actress
- Kalpnath Rai (1941–1999), Indian politician
- Kayyar Kinhanna Rai (1915–2015), Indian writer in Kannada and activist
- Krishnanand Rai (1956–2005), Indian politician
- Krishna Bahadur Rai (died 2026), Indian politician
- Kuber Nath Rai (1933–1996), Indian writer
- Kusum Rai (born 1968), Indian politician
- Lakshmi Rai (born 1989), Indian actress
- Lala Lajpat Rai (1865–1928), Indian author, freedom fighter and politician
- Lalit Rai (born 1956), Indian Army officer
- Mangla Rai (1916–1976), Indian professional wrestler
- Manikala Rai (born 1988), Nepali ultra runner
- Melina Rai, Nepali singer
- Mira Rai (born 1988), Nepali trail and sky runner
- Mona Rai (fl. 1260–1303), Chief Minister of Gour Kingdom
- Mridu Rai, Indian historian
- Mukrand Rai (fl. 1657), Mughal governor
- Muthappa Rai (died 2020), Indian businessman, philanthropist and social activist
- Nandini Rai, Indian actress
- Nityanand Rai (born 1966), Indian politician
- Pamela Rai (born 1966), Canadian swimmer
- Prakash Rai (born 1965), Indian actor, director, producer and politician
- Pramila Rai (born 1963), Nepali politician
- Raghu Rai (1942–2026), Indian photographer and photojournalist
- Rajiv Rai (born 1955), Indian film director and screenwriter
- Baba Ram Rai (1645–1687), Sikh founder of Ramraiya
- Rai Hau-min, President of the Judicial Yuan
- Ram Bahadur Rai (born 1946), Indian journalist
- Ramanna Rai (1930–2008), Indian politician
- Ramanath Rai (born 1952), Indian politician
- Ramdeo Rai (1943–2020), Indian politician
- Ramveer Rai (born 1987), Emirati cricketer
- Randeep Rai (born 1993), Indian actor
- Sabin Rai, Nepali singer
- Sara Rai (born 1956), Indian writer
- Sarita Rai, Indian politician
- Shivpujan Rai (1913–1942), Indian independence activist and politician
- Suyyash Rai (born 1989), Indian actor and singer
- Tarundeep Rai (born 1984), Indian archer
- Upendra Rai (born 1982), Indian journalist
- Vinay Rai (born 1979), Indian actor
- Vinit Rai (born 1997), Indian footballer
- Vinod Rai (born 1948), former Comptroller and Auditor General of India
- Viveki Rai (1924–2016), Indian Hindi-language writer

== See also ==
- Rai (disambiguation)
- Roi (disambiguation)
- Ray (surname)
- Roi (given name)
- Roy, a variant
- Raja
- Rai (title)
