= Mirzaabad =

Mirzaabad or Mirzabad (Persian: ميرزا آباد) may refer to:

- Mirzabad, East Azerbaijan
- Mirzaabad, Sistan and Baluchestan, Iran
- Mirzaabad, Kangavar, Kermanshah Province, Iran
- Mirzaabad, Lorestan, Iran
- Mirzaabad-e Khayyat, Iran
- Mirzaabad, alternate name of Mashhadi Hoseyn, Lorestan Province, Iran
- Mirzaabad District, Uzbekistan
- Mirzabad, Ghazipur, village in Uttar Pradesh, India
