= Pakari =

Pakari may refer to

- Pakari or Ficus lacor, also known as the Lacor Fig or Pakur, is a large evergreen tree native to subtropical regions of Asia.

== India ==
- Pakari, Siwan, is a gram panchayat in Siwan district in the Indian state of Bihar, India.
- Pakri, Bihar is a village in West Champaran district in the Indian state of Bihar.
- Pakri, Ghazipur is a small village in the Ghazipur district of Uttar Pradesh, India.

== Nepal ==
- Pakari, Saptari is a village development committee in Saptari District in Nepal.
