= Bhimapar =

- Village
- Location of Bhimapar in Uttar Pradesh Bhimapar (India)
- Coordinates: 25.62°N 83.20°E
- Country: India
- State: Uttar Pradesh
- District: Ghazipur

Government
  - Body: Gram panchayat

Area
  - Total: 3 km^{2} (1.2 sq mi)
- Elevation: 73 m (240 ft)

Population (2011)
  - Total: 4,520
  - Density: 1,500/km^{2} (3,900/sq mi)

Languages
  - Official: Hindi
- Time zone: UTC+5:30 (IST)
- PIN: 233307
- Vehicle registration: UP-61
- Sex ratio: male 48% female 52% ♂/♀

Bhimapar is a village and a Gram panchayat in Ghazipur district of Uttar Pradesh, India. Bhimapar is a developing and new face town. It is 57 km from Varanasi and 57 km from Ghazipur.

== Geography ==
Bhimapar Ghazipur Map

Bhimapar is located at 25.62°N 83.20°E. It has an average elevation of 73 metres (240 feet). Bhimapar is situated on the banks of the river Ganges. Bhimapar Ghazipur is on the main road from Varanasi to Bahariyabad and is one of the important markets of Ghazipur district.

Bhimapar is situated in Saidpur tehsil and located in Ghazipur district of Uttar Pradesh. It is one of 646 villages in Saidpur, Ghazipur Block along with villages like Jagdishpur and Khazurhat.

It belongs to Varanasi Division. It is 44 km towards west of District headquarters Ghazipur. 13 km from Sadat. 308 km from the state capital Lucknow.

Mahpur railway station, Aunrihar Junction railway station are the very nearby railway stations to Bhimapar. However Varanasi railWay station is a major railway station 43 km from Bhimapar Ghazipur.

== History ==
The village of Bhimapar, whose history is a witness, here the festival of Holi is celebrated after one day. When Pandavas lost fourteen years of ignorance after gambling in the Mahabharata, Bhim ji lived his ignorance on the same land that since then the name of this village was named Bhimapar, at that time, Maharaj Bhim lived a witch in the neighboring village of Amuwara. He was greeted after which people realised it is not a human being, but Maharaj Bhim, after which the people of the neighboring villages came here to celebrate Holi.

== Demographics ==
As of the 2011 Census of India, Bhimapar had a population of 4,520 of which 2,164 are males while 2,356 are females. Males constituted 48% of the population and females 52%. Village has higher literacy rate compared to Uttar Pradesh. In 2011, literacy rate of Bhimapar village was 75.85% compared to 67.68% of Uttar Pradesh. In Bhimapar Male literacy stands at 86.36% while female literacy rate was 66.35%.

== Education ==
Bhimapar has schools and colleges affiliated to various universities and boards. Dudh Nath Inter college and Ramcharanpur Inter college (affiliated to U.P., Allahabad) and Nagar Palika and are the leading institutions. Graduate and postgraduate degree colleges and Girls PG college are affiliated to Purvanchal University, Jaunpur.

== See also ==
- Kudva, Ghazipur
