= Semra, Ghazipur =

Semra Semra
- Village
- Location in Uttar Pradesh, India Semra (India)
- Coordinates: 25.5849134°N 83.7558707°E
- Country: India
- State: Uttar Pradesh
- District: Ghazipur
- Established: 1680; 346 years ago

Area
  - Total: 133 ha (330 acres)

Population (2011)
  - Total: 5,500
  - Density: 4,100/km^{2} (11,000/sq mi)

Languages
  - Official: Hindi
- Time zone: UTC+5:30 (IST)
- PIN: 233236
- Telephone code: 05493
- Vehicle registration: UP-61
- Precipitation: 1,100 millimetres (43 in)
- Avg. annual temperature: 32.0 °C (89.6 °F)
- Avg. summer temperature: 33.0 °C (91.4 °F)
- Avg. winter temperature: 5 °C (41 °F)

Semara is a village in Ghazipur district, Uttar Pradesh, India. Sadhobur village, also known as Rampur, is located across the Ganges opposite Semara. These villages are jointly called Rampur-Semara by the locals. Semara village comes under Sherpur gram panchayat of Mohammadabad tehsil. The population of this village is around 5500 while the number of voters is 3800.

== Geographic location ==
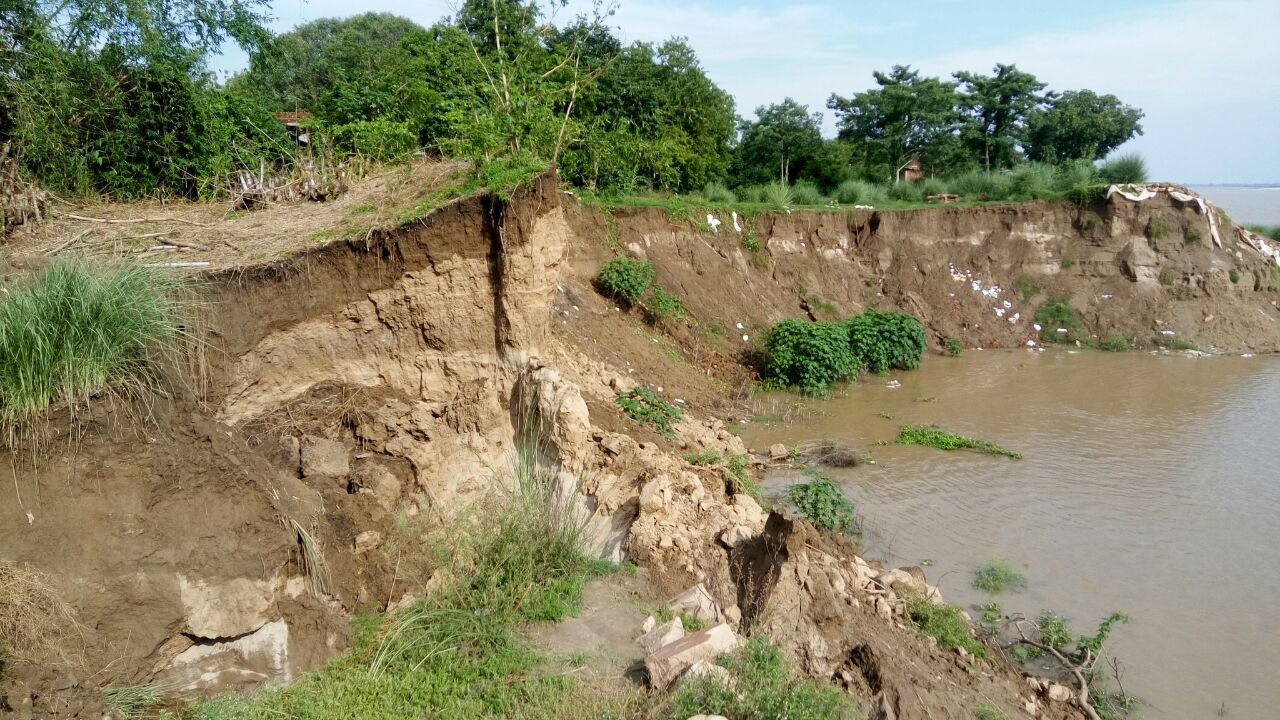
Image of a Land Colistion in Semara Village.

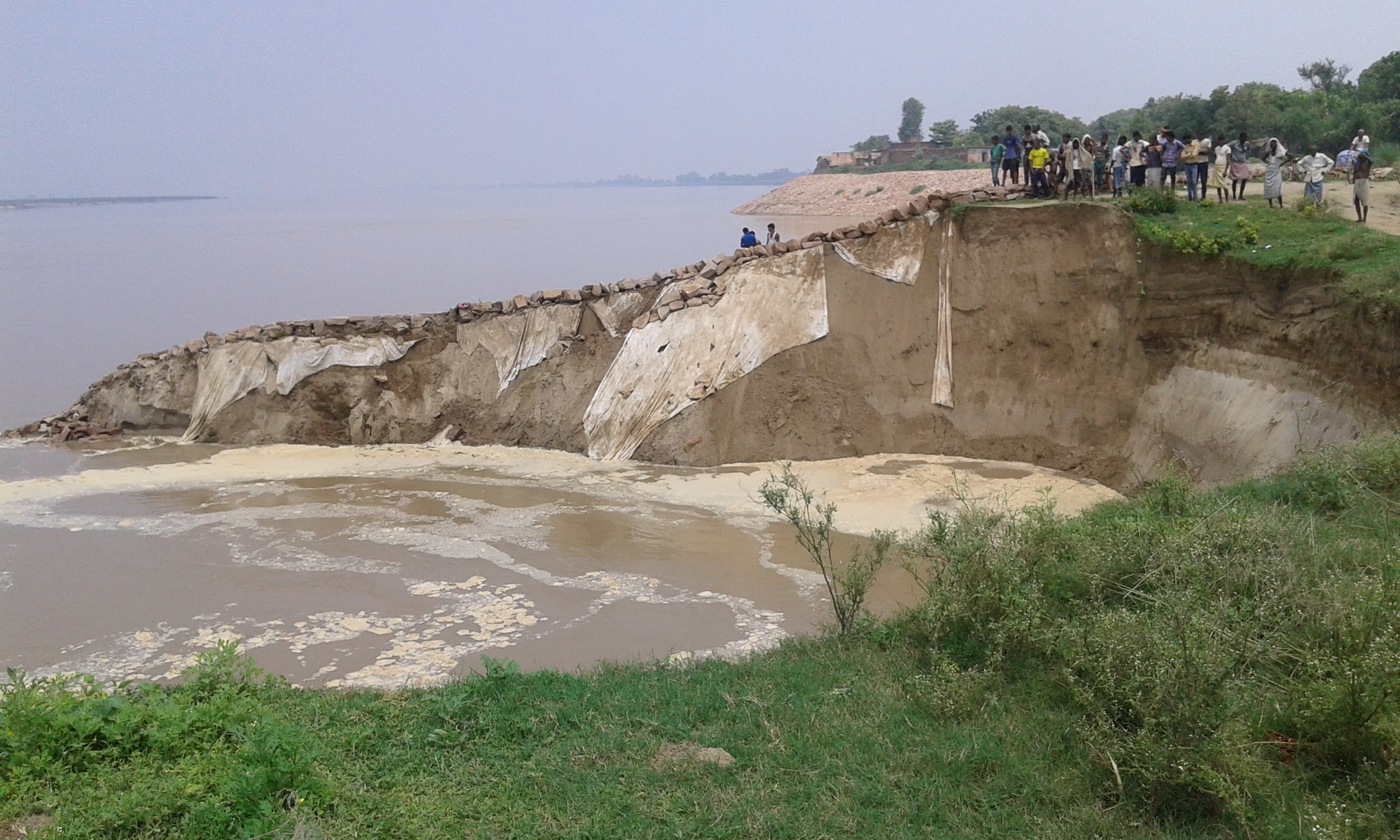
Image of Ganga River from Semara.

The village is located 30 kilometres (19 mi) east of the district headquarters in the eastern direction. The nearest railway station Yusufpur is at a distance of 8 km from here, while the village is 5 kilometres (3.1 mi) from Muhammadabad town on Ghazipur-Ballia National Highway 19. Semara is a part of Sherpur Gram Panchayat. In practice, Shiv Rai Ka Pura and Chhanbaiya are also part of Semara.The village is situated on the banks of the Gangas and has been badly plagued by Ganga Katan for over two decades. As a result of this erosion, 80 percent of Shiv Rai's entire population and 50 percent of Semra's have been absorbed into the Ganges.

== Agriculture ==
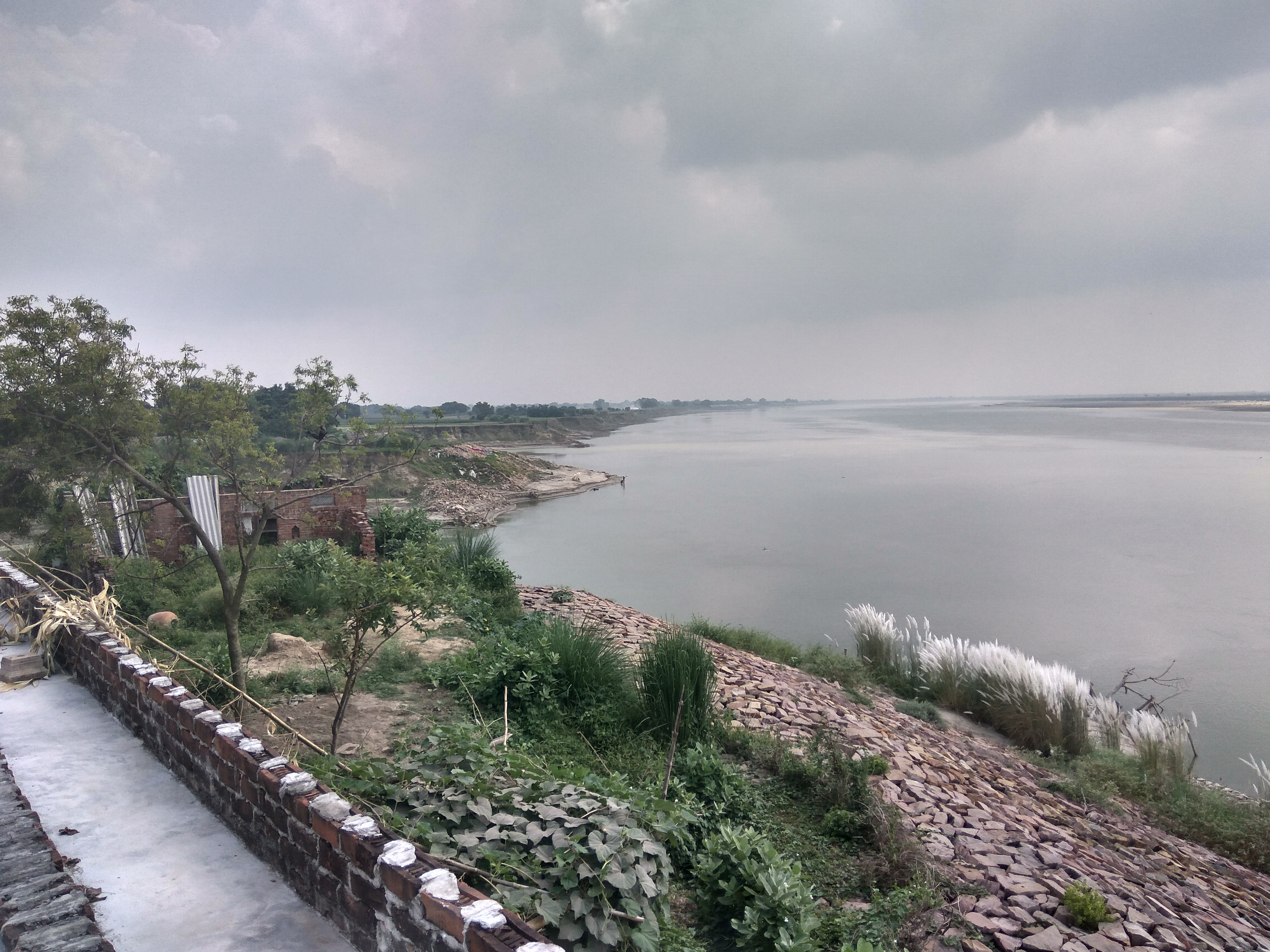
Image of a river bet in Semara.

The Semara village is good in aspects of Agriculture. The Land of the village is fertile and water level is not deeper than 100 foot. The farmers of the village also have good information about the farming and new tools and technology related to it. Machinery like tractors, combine harvesters are mostly used in the village for agriculture. Fish farming, cattle rearing, and poultry farming are also done in the village. Commercial activities are also done in the village. One of the common problems of the farmers of the village is flooding because the village is located on the banks of Ganga River and also suffers flood some times. The village is located almost 30 ft above the average water flow of Gangas.
