= Raipur, Ghazipur =

Raipur Baksot
- Village
- Nickname: Nizampur(Rampur)
- Location in Uttar Pradesh, India
- Country: India
- State: Uttar Pradesh
- District: Ghazipur
- Established: 1880; 146 years ago

Government
  - Type: Panchayati Raj (India)
  - Body: Gram Pradhan

Area
  - Total: 167.17 ha (413.1 acres)
- Elevation: 70 m (230 ft)

Population (2021)
  - Total: 867
  - Density: 519/km^{2} (1,340/sq mi)
- Demonym: Hindu's

Languages
  - Official: Bhojpuri, Hindi
- Time zone: UTC+5:30 (IST)
- PIN: 232326
- Telephone code: 05497
- Vehicle registration: UP 61

Raipur, also known as Baksot, is a village in Ghazipur district of Uttar Pradesh, India. It was a part of Daudpur and was also known as Nizampur. It is situated on the bank of (KARAMNASHA RIVER) & border of Bihar.
