= Amarupur =

- Village
- Location in Uttar Pradesh, India Amarupur (India)
- Coordinates: 25.613792°N 83.879257°E
- Country: India
- State: Uttar Pradesh
- District: Ghazipur
- Tehsil: Mohammadabad

Government
  - Type: Panchayati raj (India)
  - Body: Gram panchayat

Languages
  - Official: Hindi
  - Other spoken: Bhojpuri
- Time zone: UTC+5:30 (IST)
- Pin code: 233231
- Telephone code: 05493
- Vehicle registration: UP-61
- Website: up.gov.in

Amarupur is a village located in Mohammadabad Tehsil of Ghazipur district, Uttar Pradesh. It has a total 146 families residing. Amarupur has a population of 1216 as per Population Census 2011. This village is one of the oldest establishments of Karail area of Mohammadabad Tehsil of Ghazipur.

== History ==
Amarupur was established by Bhairav Shah's son Bishen Shah in Karail Area.

== Administration ==
Amarupur is administered by Pradhan through its Gram Panchayat as per constitution of India and Panchayati Raj Act.

Particulars	Total	Male	Female
Total No. of Houses	146		
Population	1216	629	587

== Nearby places ==
- Ghazipur
- Varanasi
- Mohammadabad, Ghazipur
- Kundesar
- Sherpur, Ghazipur
- Jogamusahib, Ghazipur
