= Rajapur, Ghazipur =

Rajapur
- Village
- Location in Uttar Pradesh, India Rajapur (India)
- Coordinates: 25.6743405°N 83.8183024°E
- Country: India
- State: Uttar Pradesh
- District: Ghazipur
- Tehsil: Mohammadabad

Government
  - Type: Panchayati raj (India)
  - Body: Gram panchayat

Languages
  - Official: Hindi
  - Other spoken: Bhojpuri
- Time zone: UTC+5:30 (IST)
- Pin code: 233301
- Telephone code: 05493
- Vehicle registration: UP-61
- Website: up.gov.in

Rajapur is a village in Mohammadabad Tehsil in Ghazipur District of Uttar Pradesh State, India. It belongs to Varanasi Division. It is located 28 km towards east from District headquarters Ghazipur. Rajapur has total 835 families residing. The Rajapur village has population of 4872 of which 2487 are males while 2385 are females as per Population Census 2011.

== History ==
Rajapur was established by Shrikant Rai Vats around 1715 A.D. with the blessing of Goril Baba as per genealogical records. He moved from Raini-Amari village of Azamgarh district to this place. This village is considered one of the Baavano Dronvar villages. Rajapur is known for farmers, army men, Pahlwan, doctors, famous engineers and also known for freedom fighters.

== Administration ==
This village is administrated by Gram Panchayat through its Pradhan who is elected representative of village. Ashwani kumar rai is the Pradhan of this village panchayat.

Particulars	Total	Male	Female
Total No. of Houses	592		
Population	3,712	1,993	1,719

== Nearby places ==
- Varanasi
- Ghazipur
- Buxar
- Mohammadabad
- Karimuddinpur
- Joga Musahib
- Khardiha
- Sherpur, Ghazipur
