= Deva Village =

Deva
- Village
- Location in Uttar Pradesh, India Deva (India)
- Coordinates: 25.8015474°N 83.415072°E
- Country: India
- State: Uttar Pradesh
- District: Ghazipur

Government
  - Body: Gram panchayat

Population (2011)
  - Total: 2,112

Languages
  - Official: Hindi
- Time zone: UTC+5:30 (IST)
- PIN: 275202
- Telephone code: 05495
- Vehicle registration: UP-61
- Distance from New Delhi: 854 kilometres (531 mi) NW (land)
- Distance from Mumbai: 1,590 kilometres (990 mi) SW (land)
- Distance from Chennai: 1,894 kilometres (1,177 mi) SE (land)
- Distance from Kolkata: 711 kilometres (442 mi) (land)
- Climate: Cfa (Köppen)
- Precipitation: 980 millimetres (39 in)
- Avg. annual temperature: 32.0 °C (89.6 °F)
- Avg. summer temperature: 33.0 °C (91.4 °F)
- Avg. winter temperature: 5 °C (41 °F)

Dewa is a village in Jakhania tehsil, Ghazipur district, Uttar Pradesh, India. It forms a part of Varanasi division and is situated on the border of Ghazipur-Azamgarh districts. It is located approximately 32 kilometres (20 mi) north of the district headquarters at Ghazipur, five kilometres (3.1 mi) from Jakhania and 319 kilometres (198 mi) from the state capital at Lucknow. The village is served by the nearby railway station at Dullahpur.

== Model Village ==
In 2015, Deva was adopted as a Model village by Manoj Sinha, the Member of Parliament and Minister of State for Communication and Railways in the Government of India. Since then a new initiative to develop this village is taking shape.
