= Asawar =

Aswar
- Village
- Location in Uttar Pradesh, India Aswar (India)
- Coordinates: 25.773182°N 83.824353°E
- Country: India
- State: Uttar Pradesh
- District: Ghazipur
- Tehsil: Mohammadabad

Government
  - Type: Panchayati raj (India)
  - Body: Gram panchayat

Languages
  - Official: Hindi
  - Other spoken: Bhojpuri
- Time zone: UTC+5:30 (IST)
- Pin code: 233225
- Telephone code: 05493
- Vehicle registration: UP-61
- Website: up.gov.in

Asawar is a village located in Mohammadabad tehsil of Ghazipur district, Uttar Pradesh. It has total 1061 families residing. Asawar has population of 6,300 as per government records.

== Administration ==
Asawar village is administrated by Gram Pradhan through its Gram Panchayat, who is elected representative of village as per constitution of India and Panchyati Raj Act. Asawar comes under Barachawar block. Asawar is a biggest village in Barachawar block. Its situated at border of neighbor district Balia. In Asawar village living mostly Brahmin, Bhumihar, Rajbhar, Yadav, Chamar and Muslims. Most Famous Place is Oldest Shiv Mandir, Nathji Mandir and Panchayat Ghar. Krantikari Yuva sangh Ramleela Samiti, Asawar Making a great environment with making 10 Days stage Drama performance of famous Ramleela at Nath Ji Mandir.

Particulars	Total	Male	Female
Total No. of Houses	1061		
Population	6300	3195	3105

== Transportation ==
This place have less frequency of Government buses. The privately owned buses rule the area.
