= Besu =

Besu may refer to:

== People ==
- Besu Sado (born 1996), Ethiopian athlete

== Places ==
- Besu River, India

== Other ==
- Bengal Engineering and Science University
