= Bhurkura =

- Village
- Location in Uttar Pradesh, India
- Coordinates: 25.76°N 83.35°E
- Country: India
- State: Uttar Pradesh
- District: Ghazipur
- Tahsil: Jakhanian

Languages
  - Official: Hindi
- Time zone: UTC+5:30 (IST)
- PIN: 275203
- Telephone code: 91-5491
- Vehicle registration: UP 61
- Website: www.ghazipur.nic.in

Bhurkura is a village in Jakhanian tehsil of Ghazipur district. of Uttar Pradesh, India. It belongs to Varanasi Division.

- Nearest cities:Ghazipur, Chandauli, Mughalsarai
- Coordinates: 25°45'50"N 83°20'54"E
- PIN Code : 275203
- postal head office : Jakhania .

== Geography ==
It is located 35 km towards the west from district headquarters Ghazipur. 4 km from Jakhania Gobind. 313 km from State capital Lucknow.

Parspur (2 km), Kudila (2 km), Amabansi (2 km), Husanpur (1 km), Chak Fatima Urf Bairak (3 km), Hathiya Ram (3 km) are the nearby villages to Bhurkura. Bhurkura is surrounded by Sadat Tehsil towards the south, Manihari Tehsil towards the south, Tarwa Tehsil towards the west, Virno Tehsil towards the east.

Saidpur, Ghazipur, Adari, and Azamgarh are the nearby cities to Bhurkura.

Sarnath (Mrigadava), Varanasi (Benares), Jaunpur, Vindhyachal, and Sasaram are the nearby important tourist destinations to see.

This Place is in the border of the Ghazipur District and Azamgarh District. Azamgarh District Jahanaganj is north towards this place .

Also it is in the border of other district Mau.

== Demographics ==
Bhojpuri is the local language. People also speak Hindi and Urdu.

== Climate ==
It is hot in the summer. Bhurkuda summer highest day temperature is in between 24 °C to 44 °C.

Average temperatures of January is 14 °C, February is 18 °C, March is 25 °C, April is 31 °C, May is 34 °C.

== Transport ==
=== Rail ===
Nearest Railway station
Jakhanian railway station	03.0 km
Dullahapur railway station	08.0 km
Sadat railway station	11.0 km
Nandganj railway station	24.8 km
Taraon railway station	26.8 km
Mau railway station	32.0 km

Nearest Airport
Ghazipur Airport (Andhau)	26.8 km
Azamgarh Airport	49.0 km
LBS Airport Varanasi	60.7 km

== Spirituality ==
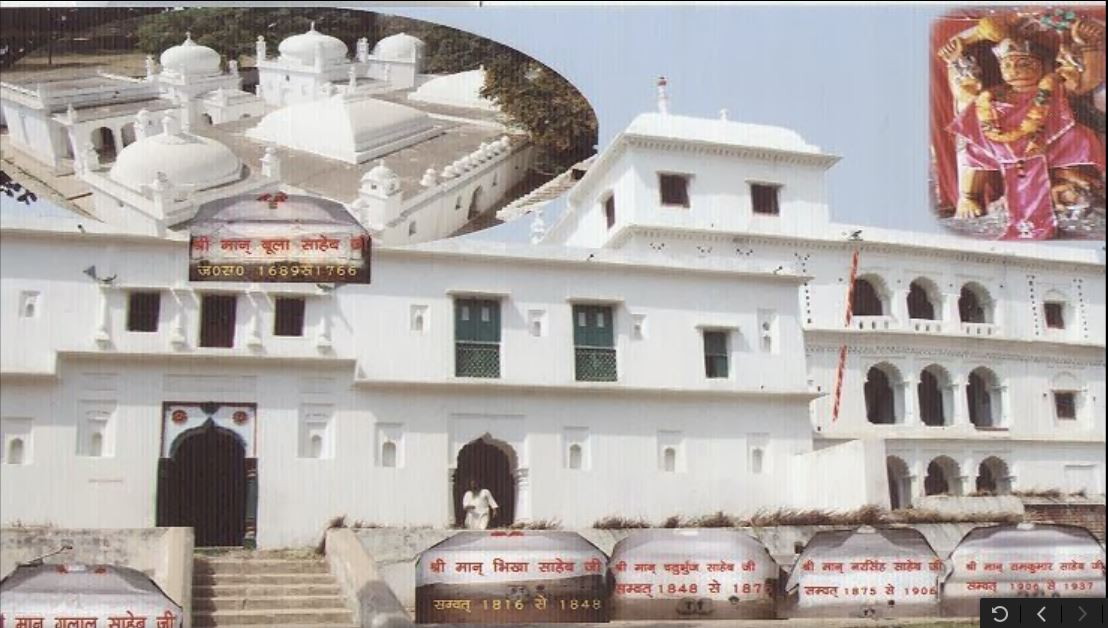
Bhikha saheb math

The Ghazipur was the main centre for its philosophical associations. This place had gained benefit from Maharshi Zamadagni ( Zamania), Maharishi Chawan (Chanani), Deval Rishi (Deval), Markandey Rishi (Near Aurihar), Bhagwan Shuka (Near Ghazipur), Bhagwan Parsuram (Harpur), etc. This place was said to have been blessed by Lord Buddha by his sermon. among them saints of Bhurkuda and their mathas are most famous in Ghazipur district and spiritually inclined people must visit here and feel the inner peace blessed by saints.

=== Saints of Bhurkuda ===
Bawari Sahiba, Bula Sahab, Bhikha Sahab and Palu Saheb & their disciples have been the source of Saint tradition. They have been of nirgun sect of satnami tradition. At Bhurkuda there are two Mathas- Bhurkura & Hathiyaram these have been the seat of Saint tradition. Hathiyaram math isn't a follower of nirgun sect. Several statues of Hindu gods and goddesses are established there.
