= Kudva =

Kudva may refer to:

- Kudva, Ghazipur, a village in Uttar Pradesh, India
- Vaman Srinivas Kudva (or V. S. Kudva), founding director of Syndicate Bank in India
