= Sukhdehri =

Sukhdehari Kalan
- Village
- Location in Uttar Pradesh, India Sukhdehari Kalan (India)
- Coordinates: 25.613997°N 83.905736°E
- Country: India
- State: Uttar Pradesh
- District: Ghazipur
- Tehsil: Mohammadabad

Government
  - Type: Panchayati raj (India)
  - Body: Gram panchayat

Languages
  - Official: Hindi
  - Other spoken: Bhojpuri
- Time zone: UTC+5:30 (IST)
- Pin code: 233233
- Telephone code: 05493
- Vehicle registration: UP-61
- Website: up.gov.in

Sukhdehri Kalan is a village located in Mohammadabad tehsil of Ghazipur district, Uttar Pradesh. It has total 110 families residing. Sukhdehri has population of 958 as per Population Census 2011.

== Administration ==
Sukhdehri Kalan village is administrated by Pradhan who is elected representative of village as per constitution of India and Panchyati Raaj Act.

Particulars	Total	Male	Female
Total No. of Houses	110		
Population	958	486	472
