= Birpur, Ghazipur =

Beerpur
- Village
- Location in Uttar Pradesh, India Beerpur (India)
- Coordinates: 25.5268502°N 83.8528383°E
- Country: India
- State: Uttar Pradesh
- District: Ghazipur
- Tehsil: Mohammadabadl
- Founder: Tikam Deo lalu

Government
  - Type: Panchayati raj (India)
  - Body: Gram panchayat

Area
  - Total: 1,163.43 ha (2,874.9 acres)

Population
  - Total: 9,377
  - Density: 806.0/km^{2} (2,087/sq mi)

Languages
  - Official: Hindi
  - Other spoken: Bhojpuri
- Time zone: UTC+5:30 (IST)
- Pin code: 233231
- Telephone code: 05493
- Vehicle registration: UP-61
- Website: up.gov.in

Beerpur is a large village located in Mohammadabad tehsil in Ghazipur district of Uttar Pradesh. It is located on the bank of river Ganges. It has total 1348 families residing. The Beerpur village has population of 9377 as per Population Census 2011.

== Administration ==
Beerpur is administered by Pradhan through its Gram Panchayat as per the constitution of India and Panchayati Raj act.

Particulars	Total	Male	Female
Total No. of Houses	1,348		
Population	8,560	4,442	4118

== Nearby places ==
- Ghazipur
- Kundesar
- Varanasi
- Mughalsarai
- Buxar

== Notable people ==
- Tikam Deo : Tikam Deo war Chero ruler who had his fort at Birpur in Twelfth Century. He was defeated by Mulhan Dikshit.
- Atul Rai : Atul Rai is a member of Parliament from Ghosi (Lok Sabha constituency).
