= Zabran Pur =

Village in Ghazipur district, Uttar Pradesh, India

Zabran Pur Jabaranpur
- sub-census village
- Location in Uttar Pradesh, India Zabran Pur (India)
- Coordinates: 25.6077778°N 83.078333°E
- Country: India
- State: Uttar Pradesh
- District: Ghazipur

Government
  - Gram Pradhan: Kiran Yadav

Area
  - Total: 0.75 km^{2} (0.29 sq mi)
- Elevation: 80.2 m (263 ft)

Languages
  - Official: Hindi
- Time zone: UTC+5:30 (IST)
- PIN: 233221
- Telephone code: 05495
- Vehicle registration: UP-61
- Nearest city: Varanasi
- Sex ratio: 1 ♂/♀
- Literacy: 90%
- Lok Sabha constituency: Ghazipur
- Vidhan Sabha constituency: Saidpur
- Climate: warm (Köppen)

Zabran Pur, also Zabranpur or Zabaranpur, otherwise Jabaranpur, Jabranpur or Jabran Pur, is a small village in Saidpur block, Ghazipur district, Varanasi division, Uttar Pradesh, India.

== Geography ==
The village comprises an area of 74.98 hectares. It is situated 35 km and 14 degrees north-east from Varanasi, 60 km west from Ghazipur, 50 km east from Jaunpur and 70 km south from Azamgarh, on the border of districts of Ghazipur and Jaunpur. It is surrounded by the villages of Mathiya, Saraiya, Gahira and Singarpur.

== Demographics ==
The population of Zabran Pur in 2011 was 527.

== Economy ==
The nearest market is Singarpur, 1 km from the village; Patrahi, connected to Ghazipur and Jaunpur, is the main market. The post office of Jabaranpur is Singarpur.

== Transport ==
Zabran Pur is directly connected to Varanasi by bus. The nearest railway station of Jabaranpur is at Aunrihar, 15 km from the village. There is a small railway station on the line connecting Aunrihar and Jaunpur at Patrahi bazar, 4 km from the village.

== Administration ==
Zabran Pur is in Saidpur tehsil and comes under the Gram Panchayat Chandpur along with the village of Gahira. It is in the Vidhan Sabha constituency of Sadat and the Lok Sabha constituency of Ghazipur.
