= Awathahi Basant =

- Village
- Location in Uttar Pradesh, India Awathahi Basant (India)
- Coordinates: 25.618262°N 83.851781°E
- Country: India
- State: Uttar Pradesh
- District: Ghazipur
- Tehsil: Mohammadabad

Government
  - Type: Panchayati raj (India)
  - Body: Gram panchayat

Languages
  - Official: Hindi
  - Other spoken: Bhojpuri
- Time zone: UTC+5:30 (IST)
- Pin code: 233227
- Telephone code: 05493
- Vehicle registration: UP-61
- Website: up.gov.in

Awathahi is a village located in Mohammadabad tehsil of Ghazipur district, Uttar Pradesh, India. Its 703 households gave it a population of 4,597 at the 2011 Census of India.

== Administration ==
Awathahi Basant village is administered by Pradhan who is an elected representative of the village as per the constitution of India and Panchyati Raaj Act.

Particulars	Total	Male	Female
Total No. of Houses	703		
Population	4597	2305	2292
