= Sarhuja, Dildarnagar =

Sarhuja
- Village
- Sarhuja
- Nickname: Barka Sultanpur
- Country: India
- State: Uttar Pradesh
- District: Ghazipur
- Established: 1820; 206 years ago

Government
  - Type: Gram panchayat
  - Body: Gram pradhan

Area
  - Total: 113.53 ha (280.5 acres)
- Elevation: 72 m (236 ft)

Population (2011)
  - Total: 1,549

Languages
  - Official: Hindi/Urdu
- Time zone: UTC+5:30 (IST)
- PIN: 232326 to** (** area code)
- Vehicle registration: UP 61
- Climate: BW (Köppen)

Sarhuja (also known as Barka Sultanpur or Rasulpur) is a village of Dildarnagar Kamsar located in Zamania tehsil of Ghazipur district, Uttar Pradesh, India. The village have large population of Kamsaar Pathaans.
