= Sherpur, Ghazipur =

Sherpur Sherpur
- Pargana
- Nickname: Dullahpur
- Location in Uttar Pradesh, India Sherpur (India)
- Coordinates: 25.5564565°N 83.8051969°E
- Country: India
- State: Uttar Pradesh
- District: Ghazipur
- Established: 1590; 436 years ago
- Founder: Dullah Rai

Area
  - Total: 49.1364 km^{2} (18.9717 sq mi)

Population (2011)
  - Total: 31,322
  - Density: 637.45/km^{2} (1,651.0/sq mi)

Languages
  - Official: Hindi
- Time zone: UTC+5:30 (IST)
- PIN: 233236
- Telephone code: 05493
- Precipitation: 980 millimetres (39 in)
- Avg. annual temperature: 32.0 °C (89.6 °F)
- Avg. summer temperature: 33.0 °C (91.4 °F)
- Avg. winter temperature: 5 °C (41 °F)
- Website: http://www.sherpur.org

The Great Sherpur is a region or a pargana of 'Shankarwar Vansh' in the Mohammadabad tehsil of Ghazipur district in Uttar Pradesh. It consists of Sherpur Kalan, Sherpur Khurd, Semra, Firozpur, villages which were established by the descendants of Dullah Rai. It has population of 31322 as per 2011 Census.

Having a history of almost four hundred years, this village has rich heritage of history of India's independence struggle. It has its own local administration under Panchayati Raj system, with Gram Pradhan as head. In British era this village along with Reotipur was known as 'Pachiso Hazaar' due to land revenue of Rupees Twenty five thousand regularly paid to British coffers. The pargana Or region of Sherpur has a total geographical area of 4913.64 Hectares and had a land area of 5197 Hectares.

== History ==
The village of Sherpur was established by 'Babu Dullah Rai' in the year 1590 A.D. Babu Dullah Rai was great-grandson of Maharaja Kamdev Misir's great-grandson Puranmal Rai. As per the genealogical records of Sanskrit gotriya 'Sakarwar' clan, the ancestors of Sherpur migrated from 'Fatuhabad' of Fatehpur district to 'Sakaradih' of Zamania Tehsil in Ghazipur district in the year of 1530 A.D. Families of two brothers named 'Kamdev Misir' and 'Dhamdev Misir' moved eastward after the 'battle of Madarpur' and settled at Sakaradih, while third brother Biramdev Misir's family moved in north to some unknown place. Madarpur battle was fought between Mughal general Mir Baqi and a united army of Bhumihar zamindars near Kanpur in 1528 A.D.
In this battle Bhumihar warriors fought bravely but were defeated due to use of advanced technology and gunpowder by Mughal armies. This was the last major resistance in front of advancing Mughal army towards east as was mentioned in 'Kanyakubja Prabodhini':

Madaradipurakhyasya bhuinhara dwijastu ye।

Tebhyashcha Yavanendraishcha mahat-yuddham-abhutpura॥2॥

Tebhyashch-brahmanah sarve parasta abhawans-tatah॥

(transl. As per the account of Madarpur, zamindars, known as Bhumihars, fought bravely against the army of The Mughal emperor. However they all were defeated.)
In the fifth generation of Kam Misir's son Achal Misir, Babu Dullah Rai crossed holy Ganga river and identified a new place for the inhabitation of his large family. He named the place Sherpur. Originally Sherpur is a region which consists of the villages of Sherpur Kalan, Sherpur Khurd, Semra, Firozpur, and Prithivipur, and Jamalpur, these villages excluding Firozpur were established by the descendants of Babu Dullah Rao.

People of Sherpur played indelible role in 1942 Quit India Movement. Under the leadership of Dr.Shivpujan Rai a group of freedom fighters hoisted the tricolor flag at Mohammadabad Tehsil. In doing so Dr.Shivpujan Rai, Rishishewar Rai, Vans Narayan Rai, Ram Badan Upadhyay, Raj Narayan Rai, Narayan Rai, Vashishtha Narain Rai and Bans Narain Rai sacrificed their life for the motherland on 18 August 1942.

== Gram Panchayat ==
Sherpur has one of the biggest Gram Panchayat of Ghazipur district having six villages, Sherpur Kalan, Sherpur Khurd, Semra, Vachhal ka pura, Dharampura under its fold. Since independence of the country the village pradhan of Sherpur has played an important role in local politics of Ghazipur district. At present Mrs. Anjali Rai is the Gram Pradhan of this panchayat.

== Transport ==
The village is nearly 32 km from Ghazipur city Railway station and UP Roadways Ghazipur depot. Other nearby railway stations are Yusufpur and Buxar railway station. Sherpur can be reached through road transport by mean of private or rented vehicles, such as buses and taxies.

== Agriculture ==
Agriculture is the main source of income and livelihood for the residents. Nearly all type of food grains which are cultivated in eastern UP are also produced here, popular crops include wheat, paddy and potatoes, though other crops such as mustard, lentils, grams are also produced in large quantities, the village has privately owned rice mills and oil mills. Farmers often sell their products either in the local market or in the anaj mandi (government food grains store house) located in Yusufpur. Farming is done with semi modern and semi classical techniques, tractors electrical water pumping sets are used for farming but bigger machines like harvesters are also used in the village.

== Language and culture ==
Language spoken by majority in the village is a mix of Bhojpuri and Hindi, though Sanskrit has also a great influence on it. Culturally the area is much influenced by Varanasi which is a major cultural center nearby.

== Nearby places ==
- Mohammadabad, Ghazipur
- Kundesar
- Yusufpur
- Khardiha
- Rajapur, Ghazipur
- Dildarnagar Kamsar
- Semra
