= Meghai River =

River in India

Meghai Megha, Megaie

Location
- Country: India
- State: Uttar Pradesh
- Districts: Ghazipur, Mau,

Physical characteristics
- Mouth: Tamsa River
- Length: 313 km (194 mi)
- Width
  - average: 130ft

Meghai is a river located in Uttar Pradesh of India. Meghai flows through parts of the Ghazipur, Mau, Sultanpur, Akbarpur and Azamgarh Districts. It starts from Azamgarh District and its mouth opens at Tamsa river.
