= Mahali, Ghazipur =

Mahali Salempur
- Village
- Location in Uttar Pradesh, India
- Coordinates: 25°21′20″N 83°34′32″E
- Country: India
- State: Uttar Pradesh
- District: Ghazipur
- First settled: 1870

Government
  - Type: Panchayati Raj (India)
  - Body: Gram Pradhan

Area
  - Total: 555.55 ha (1,372.8 acres)
- Elevation: 70 m (230 ft)

Population (2011)
  - Total: 1,329
  - Density: 239.2/km^{2} (619.6/sq mi)

Languages
  - Official: Bhojpuri, Hindi, Urdu
- Time zone: UTC+5:30 (IST)
- PIN: 232326
- Telephone code: 05497
- Vehicle registration: UP 61

Mahali (also before known as Salempur) is a village in Zamania tehsil of Ghazipur district of Uttar Pradesh, India. Salempur was a region in Daudpur but later in 1870 many families came and established the village Mahali and the name was renamed.
