= Patakaniya, Ghazipur =

Patakaniya
- village
- Interactive map of Patakaniya
- Country: India
- State: Uttar Pradesh
- District: Ghazipur
- Established: 1650; 376 years ago

Government
  - Body: Gram panchayat

Area
  - Total: 1,883.23 ha (4,653.6 acres)

Population (2011)
  - Total: 5,709
  - Density: 303.1/km^{2} (785.2/sq mi)

Languages
  - Official: Hindi
- Time zone: UTC+5:30 (IST)
- Vehicle registration: UP

Patakaniaya is a village in Ghazipur District of Uttar Pradesh, India
