= Bhainsai =

Bhainsai is the name of both a river and a village in Uttar Pradesh.

== River ==
The Bhainsai River rises in the Muhammadabad Gohna Mau, passes through Zahoorabad and falls into the Tamsa river near Bahadurganj, Ghazipur, Uttar Pradesh.

== Village ==
A small village named after this river is located in Balrampur District. The main occupation of people living here is agriculture. Even today, this and nearby villages lack basic services such as electricity service or toilets. The nearest railway station is located in Mankapur, around 40 km from the village. Bazaar is also held on Fridays of every week.
