= Brij Mangal Rai =

Mantri Saheb Babu Brij Mangal Rai

President of the District Congress Committee
- In office 1961–1966

Personal details
- Born: 14 January 1914 Khardiha Ghazipur, India
- Died: 13 February 1998 (aged 84) Ghazipur
- Party: Indian National Congress
- Profession: Educationist; Politician; Freedom Activist

Brijmangal Rai was a freedom fighter who established several educational institution after the independence in district Ghazipur. Being an important political leader of ruling Congress party, it was very easy for him to garner political favour or to grab some powerful post in Uttar Pradesh government. However he opted for social services only, living a life of yogi, not accepting even the pension of freedom fighters.

== Early life ==
Born in a Bhumihar farming family in village Khardiha of district Ghazipur of Uttar Pradesh, Brijmangal Rai was a very brilliant student. He passed 6th standard from Karimuddinpur Middle School in 1926 but did not complete his education due to his devotion to the motherland. He was influenced by Mahatma Gandhi, leaving school to become a freedom fighter. He rose to prominence very quickly in the Congress Sangathan and was nominated as a mandal secretary when aged 22. In this role he attracted attention of British government agencies, causing him to go underground for several years. He avoided arrest, despite many raids and tip-offs, and remained active. The police harassed his family and his house was sealed until after independence. The British government terminated the services of his younger brother Brijnath Rai, who was working as market inspector in those days.

== Freedom fighter ==
In 1942 Quit India movement, Brijmangal Rai played an important role conducting organisational activities. He was served an arrest warrant within a week of spearheading the movement. But he got underground and was not arrested until four years. As a result, the entire property of his family was attached. In the year 1946 he was arrested but British Government was packing its bags from India. All the independence activists were being released, therefore all the charges were withdrawn against Brijmangal Rai and subsequently he was released.

== Educationist ==
Brij Mangal Rai established Shri Sarvoday Inter College in Khardiha village in the year of 1952. He made Khardiha an educational center by establishing BTC training center and a Degree College. Due to his pioneering task thousand of rural youth got the opportunity for better education. Many of these student achieved greater heights in their professional career. It was Brijmangal Rai who identified the talented Hindi writer Veveki Rai and appointed him as a teacher in his newly founded secondary school. He was also instrumental in establishing Swami Sahajanand Post Graduate College in Ghazipur. He was treasurer of the management committee of the College.

== Achievements ==
Although he never contested any assembly or Lok Sabha election but he ensured victory of congress candidate from his assembly constituency five continuous terms. Babu Vijay Shankar Singh (MLA) and Mantri Ji had excellent bonding and trust on each other. He served as member of Pradesh Congress Committee but he didn't ask for any political favour. He had close rapport with Sucheta Kriplani (Ex. Chief Minister of Uttar Pradesh) and Chandra Bhanu Gupta (also an Ex. CM of Uttar Pradesh). On his invitation Sucheta Kriplani visited his native place Khardiha and inaugurated Mahila Praudh Sikhsa Kendra along with BTC training center. Babu Brij Mangal Rai devoted his entire life for the betterment of rural people of Ghazipur district. That is why he is remembered as 'Malviya Ji' of Ghazipur.

== Death and legacy ==
Brij Mangal rai was a devotee of Bhagwan Shiv. His lived a life of disciplined yogi. As a true Gandhian his attire was khadi dhoti only. Instead of dhoti he hardly wore any cloth in upper part of his body. Although being a political person he lived an unblemished or spotless life of 84 years. Due to disciplined life he never experienced health problem till the very old age.
