= Karimuddinpur =

- Village
- Location in Uttar Pradesh, India Karimuddinpur (India)
- Coordinates: 25.7020661°N 83.8734399°E
- Country: India
- State: Uttar Pradesh
- District: Ghazipur
- Tehsil: Mohammadabad

Government
  - Type: Panchayati raj (India)
  - Body: Gram panchayat

Languages
  - Official: Hindi
  - Other spoken: Bhojpuri
- Time zone: UTC+5:30 (IST)
- Pin code: 233225
- Telephone code: 05493
- Vehicle registration: UP-61
- Website: up.gov.in

Karimuddinpur is a village located in Mohammadabad tehsil of Ghazipur district, Uttar Pradesh, India with a total of 1,738 families residing. The Karimuddinpur village has a population of 10,161 as per Population Census 2011.

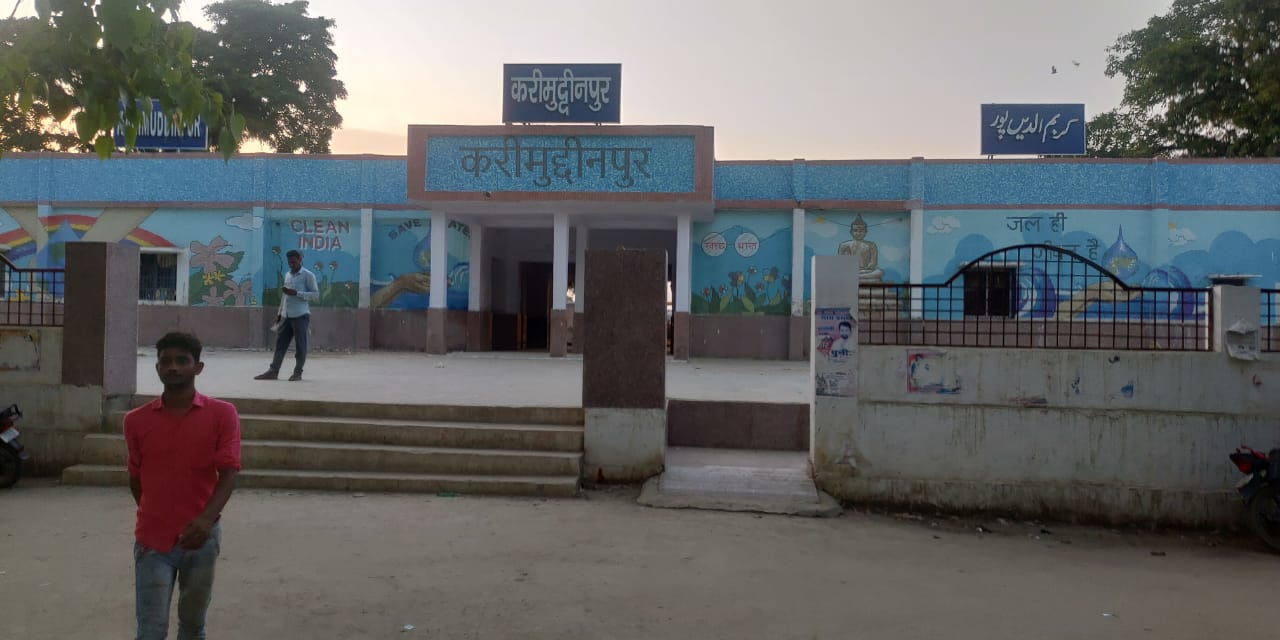
Railway Station Karimuddinpur

== History ==
As per historical records Karimuddinpur was established by Prithviraj shah( also known as pithaur shah and prithuraj shah) , the great-great-grandson of Raja Mulhan Dikshit in 1362 CE. Raja Mulhan Dikshit was a Kashyap Gotriya Kinwar Bhumihar. Kinwar is a part of Kanyabubj Brahman Sakha. The third branch of Kinwars flourished here. Prithviraj Shah had seventeen great grandsons through his Two Grandson. These all seventeen grandsons established 17 villages in Karail area, known as "Sataraho".

The Sataraho was a branch of the Kashyap Gotriya Kinwar Bhumihars. They are part of kanyabubj Brahman Sakha. One of the young members of Babu Sangram Rai's family of Sonari, was a cavalry officer in the Tughulaq army. He acted bravely in the war against the Bengal rebels. For this bravery, he was awarded a jagir in Singhabad of the Malda district. Later, Raja Bhairvendra Narayan Rai of Singhabad (Malda) earned a reputation during the struggle for India's independence.

Kashtaharani Bhavani Temple is located in Karimuddinpur village of Ghazipur district of Uttar Pradesh. It is believed about this Dham that it is the temple of the goddess mentioned in Padmapuran and Valmiki Ramayana where Lord Ram along with Guru Vishwamitra and Anuj Lakshman had worshiped while going from Ayodhya to Buxar. [1]

Malik Pahlwan tomb is situated at east side of village and Hindu and Muslim Community both are worship .

== Administration ==
Karimuddinpur village is administrated by a head of Village who is elected representative of village as per constitution of India and Panchayati Raj Act.

Particulars	Total	Male	Female
Total No. of Houses	1738		
Population	10,161	5,295	4,866

== Transport ==
Karimuddinpur could be reached through road and rail route. Karimuddinpur has its own railway station on Varanasi-Chhapra route.

== Nearby places ==
- Ballia
- Ghazipur
- Varanasi
- Buxar
- Mohammadabad
- Rasra
- Chitbara Gaon
- Joga Musahib
- Rajapur, Ghazipur
