= Gagran =

Gagran is a rural village in the Ghazipur district of the State of Uttar Pradesh in India. In 2011, it had a total population of 3027. Dildarnagar is the nearest railway station from this village. Nagsar is the nearest local railway station which is added by Dildarnagar. The village was formerly a part of Nagsar.
