= Firozpur, Ghazipur =

Firozpur Kalan
- Village
- Location in Uttar Pradesh, India Firozpur Kalan (India)
- Coordinates: 25.658724°N 83.479380°E
- Country: India
- State: Uttar Pradesh
- District: Ghazipur
- Tehsil: Mohammadabad

Government
  - Type: Panchayati raj (India)
  - Body: Gram panchayat

Languages
  - Official: Hindi
  - Other spoken: Bhojpuri
- Time zone: UTC+5:30 (IST)
- Pin code: 233227
- Telephone code: 05493
- Vehicle registration: UP-61
- Website: up.gov.in

Firozpur Kalan is a village located in Mohammadabad tehsil of Ghazipur district, Uttar Pradesh. It has total 316 families residing. Firozpur has population of 2167 as per Population Census 2011. This village belongs to Varanasi Division . It is located at distance of 13 km towards East from District headquarters Ghazipur, 6 km towards west from Mohammadabad tehsil and at a distance of 357 km towards east from State capital Lucknow.

== History ==
Firozpur and Gouspur has very close connection with renaming of Ghazipur during the rule of Tughlaq Dynasty. As per historical records 'Chakwa King Mandhata' (one of descendant of Prithviraj Chouhan) had his citadel at 'Kathaut'. However Syed Masud Al-Husaini, one of the general of 'Firoz Shah Tughlaq' defeated Raja Mandhata near Firozpur. After this victory Syed Masud was conferred the title of 'Malik al-Sadat Ghazi' by the Sultan Firoz Shah Tughlaq and appointed as administrator of the vanquished rebellious king's estate. Some historian says that he founded a new city with the name of Ghazipur but according to some researchers he renamed the old city of 'Gadhipuri' as Ghazipur in 1330 A.D. It was Syed Masud Ghazi who established a settlement as village 'Firozpur' as mark of honour towards Sultan Firoz Shah Tughlaq and also established a new village 'Gouspur' near Kathaut.

== Administration ==
Firozpur village is administrated by Pradhan who is elected representative of village as per constitution of India and Panchyati Raaj Act.

Particulars	Total	Male	Female
Total No. of Houses	316		
Population	2167	1066	1101

== Airstrip ==
During world war-II British government built three airstrips in Ghazipur, one at Andhau, another near Gomti bridge at Varanasi-Ghazipur route and third near this village. However it is known as 'Gouspur Hawai Adda'. This airstrip was strategically built by British-US allied forces as line of defense against advancement of INA and Japanese forces and expected fear of fall of Calcutta and eastern sector. Now this airstrip is abandoned by Government of India.

== Transport ==
Firozpur Kalan could be reached through road and rail route. This village is situated close to National Highway No. 19. Shahbazkuli and Yusufpur are nearby railway stations.
