= Holipur Village =

Holipur
- Village
- Location in Uttar Pradesh Location in India Location in Asia Location in Earth
- Coordinates: 25.534687°N 83.270687°E
- Country: India
- State: Uttar Pradesh
- District: Ghazipur

Government
  - Type: Panchayati Raj
  - Body: Gram Panchayat
  - MLA: Ankit Bharti

Area
  - Total: 1.36 km^{2} (0.53 sq mi)

Population (2011)
  - Total: 2,325

Languages
  - Official: Hindi, Bhojpuri
- Time zone: UTC+5:30 (IST)
- PIN: 233304
- Nearest city: Ghazipur
- Literacy: 90%
- Lok Sabha constituency: Ghazipur
- Vidhan Sabha constituency: Saidpur
- Civic agency: Gram Panchayat

Holipur is a village located in the saidpur tehsil of Ghazipur district, Uttar Pradesh. According to the 2011 census, the village is home to approximately 331 familie, with a total population of around 2,325. Its PIN code is 233304

== Reason and Belief ==
Local elders believe that the village was named 'Holipur' because, since ancient times, the site was renowned for its Holi celebrations the festival of colors—as well as fairs and traditional festivities. During the festival, large crowds from surrounding areas would gather here. Due to this cultural and historical significance, the place came to be known colloquially as 'Holipur' (meaning 'Place of Holi'), a name that eventually became the village's official designation.

== Geography ==
Holipur village is located in the Saidpur Tehsil of Ghazipur district in the Indian state of Uttar Pradesh. It is administered by the Holipur Gram Panchayat and falls under the Saidpur Community Development Block. The nearest town to Holipur is Ghazipur, situated approximately 3 kilometers away

== Travel and Communication ==
There is a railway station less than 5 kilometers away from the village.

== Land and Natural Resources ==
Maps, reports, and datasets related to the topography, land use, land cover (LULC), and watershed/hydrological parameters of Holipur are available as a professional paid service.

== School/College's ==
There is a private primary school in Holipur village. There is a private arts and science degree college in Holipur village. and Moolchand Mahavidyalaya
