= Tokawa, Ghazipur =

Toakawa Urf Lotawa
- Village
- Location in Uttar Pradesh, India
- Coordinates: 25°23′N 83°35′E
- Country: India
- State: Uttar Pradesh
- District: Ghazipur
- Established: 1865; 161 years ago

Government
  - Type: Panchayati Raj (India)
  - Body: Gram Pradhan

Area
  - Total: 267.64 ha (661.4 acres)
- Elevation: 70 m (230 ft)

Population (2011)
  - Total: 1,481
  - Density: 553.4/km^{2} (1,433/sq mi)

Languages
  - Official: Bhojpuri, Hindi, Urdu
- Time zone: UTC+5:30 (IST)
- PIN: 232326
- Telephone code: 05497
- Vehicle registration: UP 61

Tokawa also known as Lotawa. Tokawa and Lotawa are actually the naugburing villages. They were the part of Daudpur(Dewaitha) bu? were layer, made new village. They were before known as Nishadpur when they wete in Daudpur.
