= Pakhanpura =

Pakhanpura is a village situated in Bhawarnkol Block in Ghazipur district of Uttar Pradesh, India. The village lies 29 km east of Ghazipur, 18 km (11 mi) from Bhawarnkol, and 373 km (232 mi) from the State capital Lucknow. The village has one post office. The population of the village is approximately 25,000 people.

Summary
Subject	
Office	Pakhanpura ( पखनपुरा )
State	UTTAR PRADESH
Pincode	233227
Country	India
Taluk	NH31 AND PRUWANCHAL EXPRESSWAY
Nearest Town	muhammadabad
District	Ghazipur
Language	Hindi Urdu, and Bhojpuri
Region	India
