= Abhaipur, Ghazipur =

Abhaipur Nizampur, Lakhimipur
- Village
- Location in Uttar Pradesh, India
- Coordinates: 25.3384°N 83.56701°E
- Country: India
- State: Uttar Pradesh
- District: Ghazipur
- Established: 1800; 226 years ago

Government
  - Type: Panchayati Raj (India)
  - Body: Gram Pradhan

Area
  - Total: 104.97 ha (259.4 acres)
- Elevation: 70 m (230 ft)

Population (2011)
  - Total: 1,114
  - Density: 1,061/km^{2} (2,749/sq mi)

Languages
  - Official: Bhojpuri, Hindi, Urdu
- Time zone: UTC+5:30 (IST)
- PIN: 232331
- Telephone code: 05497
- Vehicle registration: UP 61

Abhaipur urf Lakhimipur (before also known as Nizampur when it was a part of Daudpur) is a village in Ghazipur District of Uttar Pradesh, India.
