= Dehriya, Ghazipur =

Dehriya Udharanpur
- Village
- Nickname: Chotka Qasimpur
- Location in Uttar Pradesh, India
- Coordinates: 25.34°N 83.62°E
- Country: India
- State: Uttar Pradesh
- District: Ghazipur
- Established: 1720; 306 years ago

Government
  - Type: Panchayati Raj (India)
  - Body: Gram Pradhan

Area
  - Total: 66.42 ha (164.1 acres)
- Elevation: 70 m (230 ft)

Population (2011)
  - Total: 588
  - Density: 885/km^{2} (2,290/sq mi)

Languages
  - Official: Bhojpuri, Hindi, Urdu
- Time zone: UTC+5:30 (IST)
- PIN: 232326
- Telephone code: 05497
- Vehicle registration: UP 61

Dehriya also known as Udharanpur Urf Dehraiya or Chotka Qasimpur is a village in Zamania tehsil of the Ghazipur District Uttar Pradesh, India.

== Historical population ==
Population Growth of Dehriya
Year	Pop.	±%
1861	50	—
1871	52	+4.0%
1881	55	+5.8%
1891	61	+10.9%
1901	67	+9.8%
1911	73	+9.0%
1921	80	+9.6%
1931	90	+12.5%
1941	82	−8.9%
1951	123	+50.0%
1961	430	+249.6%
1971	500	+16.3%
1981	510	+2.0%
1991	540	+5.9%
2001	570	+5.6%
2011	588	+3.2%
Source:Census of India
