= Thanaipur =

Coordinates: 25°41′N 83°39′E

Thanaipur is a village in the Ghazipur district of Uttar Pradesh, India. It is currently an independent gram panchayat. It is surrounded by guava and mango gardens. There is an old temple and a pond near the primary school. It is situated approximately 2 km northwest of Nonahara and 1.5 km east of Chataipara. There is a lack of infrastructure inside the village. Roads are still to be cemented. The temple located in the village is of God Shiva and is quite old. Even older generations of the village could not provide the exact information about establishment of the temple. The temple is situated in the western part of the village.

There are more than 1,400 people residing in the village. This population is distributed among different castes and sections. The village spread in 3 puras.

Towns around the village is:

- East: Hardiya
- West: Mahmood Pur
- North: Bhala
- South: Taal (vacant area)

Thanaipur is connected to all its nearest towns via good roads, even though the roads inside the village may disappoint you. It is approximately 17 kilometers from Ghazipur city and railway station.
