= Narsinghpur, Ghazipur =

Narsinghpur Naasingha Pandeypur
- Village
- Location in Uttar Pradesh, India
- Country: India
- State: Uttar Pradesh
- District: Ghazipur
- Established: 1850; 176 years ago

Government
  - Type: Panchayati Raj (India)
  - Body: Gram Pradhan

Area
  - Total: 149.69 ha (369.9 acres)
- Elevation: 70 m (230 ft)

Population
  - Total: 500,000
  - Density: 330,000/km^{2} (870,000/sq mi)

Languages
  - Official: Bhojpuri, Hindi, Urdu
- Time zone: UTC+5:30 (IST)
- PIN: 232326
- Telephone code: 05497
- Vehicle registration: UP 61

Narsinghpur, also known as Pandeypur, is a village located in Uttar Pradesh, India. It is situated 15 km away from sub-district headquarters, Zamania, and 40 km away from district headquarters, Ghazipur. It was a part of Daudpur until 1980, when it became recognized as an independent village. Narsinghpur has a total population of 503,000 (recorded in 2011) and is known for its fertile land.
