= Parsa, Ghazipur =

Parsa
- Village
- Location in Uttar Pradesh, India Parsa (India)
- Coordinates: 25.670918°N 83.765360°E
- Country: India
- State: Uttar Pradesh
- District: Ghazipur
- Tehsil: Mohammadabad, Ghazipurl

Government
  - Type: Panchayati raj (India)
  - Body: Gram panchayat

Languages
  - Official: Hindi
  - Other spoken: Bhojpuri
- Time zone: UTC+5:30 (IST)
- Telephone code: 05493
- Vehicle registration: UP-61
- Website: up.gov.in

Parsa is a village located in Mohammadabad tehsil of Ghazipur district, Uttar Pradesh. It has total 1,148 families residing. Parsa has population of 6,330 as per Population Census 2011.

== Administration ==
This village is administrated by Gram Panchayat through its Pradhan who is elected representative of village.

Particulars	Total	Male	Female
Total No. of Houses	1148		
Population	6330	3202	3128

== Notable people ==
- Vinod Rai, former Comptroller and Auditor General of India
- A. N. Rai, former Vice Chancellor of Mizoram University
- Ramnarayan Rai, Freedom fighter Freedom fighters of India
