= Sultanpur, Ghazipur =

Sultanpur
- Hamlet
- Interactive map of Sultanpur
- Country: India
- State: Uttar Pradesh
- District: Ghazipur
- Established: 1880; 146 years ago

Government
  - Body: Gram panchayat

Area
  - Total: 183.65 ha (453.8 acres)

Population (2011)
  - Total: 44
  - Density: 24/km^{2} (62/sq mi)

Languages
  - Official: Hindi
- Time zone: UTC+5:30 (IST)
- Vehicle registration: UP
- Website: up.gov.in

Sultanpur is a hamlet of Dildarnagar Kamsar located in Ghazipur District of Uttar Pradesh, India.
