= Deorhi, Ghazipur =

Deorhi Husainpur
- Village
- Location in Uttar Pradesh, India
- Country: India
- State: Uttar Pradesh
- District: Ghazipur
- Established: 1700; 326 years ago
- Founder: Zorawar Singh Rathore

Government
  - Type: Panchayati Raj (India)
  - Body: Gram Pradhan

Area
  - Total: 292.28 ha (722.2 acres)
- Elevation: 70 m (230 ft)

Population (2011)
  - Total: 2,581
  - Density: 883.1/km^{2} (2,287/sq mi)

Languages
  - Official: Bhojpuri, Hindi,
- Time zone: UTC+5:30 (IST)
- PIN: 232331
- Telephone code: 05497
- Vehicle registration: UP 61

Deorhi is a village in Zamania tehsil of Ghazipur District, Uttar Pradesh, India.
