= Khanpur, Ghazipur =

Khanpur (village)
- Village
- Location in Uttar Pradesh, India
- Coordinates: 25.341°N 83.0740°E
- Country: India
- State: Uttar Pradesh
- District: Ghazipur

Government
  - Body: Gram panchayat

Area
  - Total: 9 km^{2} (3.5 sq mi)
- Elevation: 80.2 m (263 ft)

Population (2011)
  - Total: 10,000
  - Density: 1,100/km^{2} (2,900/sq mi)

Languages
  - Languages: Hindi, English, Bhojpuri
- Time zone: UTC+5:30 (IST)
- PIN: 233223
- Telephone code: 915495
- Vehicle registration: UP-61
- Nearest city: Varanasi
- Lok Sabha constituency: Ghazipur (2009)
- Vidhan Sabha constituency: Saidpur
- Nearest Railway Station: Aunrihar
- Climate: warm (Köppen)
- Website: http://ghazipur.nic.in/

Khanpur is a village in Ghazipur district, Uttar Pradesh, India. It situated 30 km north-east from Varanasi, 45 km west from Ghazipur, 56 km east from Jaunpur, and 80 km south from Azamgarh.

There are six villages in the local self-government (gram panchayat) area of Khanpur, being Khanpur Bairahia, Khanpur Nonara, Khanpur Basti(Chamaruti, Khanpur Emirti, Khanpur Dih, and Khanpur Usarahan. The nearest railway station is at Aunrihar, 7 km away and there is a direct bus connection to Varanasi. There is also a hospital.

There are temples to several gods, including Goria dih, Jamaki Dih, Kali, Durga, Shiva, Hanuman, Krishna, and Ram.
