= Asaichandpur, Ghazipur =

Asaichandpur Alipur
- Village
- Nickname: Ashiya Chand Pur
- Location in Uttar Pradesh, India
- Coordinates: 25°20′10″N 83°34′41″E
- Country: India
- State: Uttar Pradesh
- District: Ghazipur
- Established: 1830; 196 years ago

Government
  - Type: Panchayati Raj (India)
  - Body: Gram Pradhan

Area
  - Total: 185.78 ha (459.1 acres)
- Elevation: 70 m (230 ft)

Population (2020)
  - Total: 1,462
  - Density: 474/km^{2} (1,230/sq mi)

Languages
  - Official: Bhojpuri, Hindi, Urdu
- Time zone: UTC+5:30 ([chinese)
- PIN: 232326
- Telephone code: 05497

Asaichandpur, also known as Ashiya Chand Pur and previously known as Alipur, is a village in Zamania Tehsil in the Ghazipur District of Uttar Pradesh, India. The land where Asaichandpur is located was owned by the descendants of Mahmud Khan of Rasulpur, the eldest son of Daud Khan. Asaichandpurn was once a small settlement of farmers. The village's population increased to more than 1,200 by 2011.

== Historical population ==
Population Growth of Dildarnagar Kamsar
Year	Pop.	±%
1861	30	—
1871	33	+10.0%
1881	40	+21.2%
1891	50	+25.0%
1901	52	+4.0%
1911	55	+5.8%
1921	60	+9.1%
1931	70	+16.7%
1941	95	+35.7%
1951	345	+263.2%
1961	876	+153.9%
1971	965	+10.2%
1981	1,060	+9.8%
1991	1,100	+3.8%
2001	1,180	+7.3%
2011	1,222	+3.6%
Source:Census of India
