= Hasanpura, Ghazipur =

Hasanpura Hasanpur
- Village
- Location in Uttar Pradesh, India
- Country: India
- State: Uttar Pradesh
- District: Ghazipur
- Established: 1800; 226 years ago
- Founder: Zamindar Hasan Khan

Government
  - Type: Panchayati Raj (India)
  - Body: Gram Pradhan

Area
  - Total: 92.87 ha (229.5 acres)
- Elevation: 70 m (230 ft)

Population (2011)
  - Total: 2,063
  - Density: 2,221/km^{2} (5,753/sq mi)
- Demonym(s): Hasanpuriya, Reotipuri

Languages
  - Official: Bhojpuri, Hindi, Urdu
- Time zone: UTC+5:30 (IST)
- PIN: 232326
- Telephone code: 05497
- Vehicle registration: UP 61

Hasanpura is a village in Ghazipur District of Uttar Pradesh, India.
