= Tiyari, Ghazipur =

Tiyari
- Village
- Location in Uttar Pradesh, India
- Coordinates: 25.38734°N 83.62263°E
- Country: India
- State: Uttar Pradesh
- District: Ghazipur
- Inhabited: 1790; 236 years ago

Government
  - Type: Panchayati Raj (India)
  - Body: Gram Pradhan

Area
  - Total: 6.8196 km^{2} (2.6331 sq mi)
- Elevation: 70 m (230 ft)

Population (2011)
  - Total: 5,366
  - Density: 786.8/km^{2} (2,038/sq mi)

Languages
  - Official: Hindi, Urdu
- Time zone: UTC+5:30 (IST)
- PIN: 232326
- Telephone code: 05497
- Vehicle registration: UP 61

Tiyari is a village located in Ghazipur District of Uttar Pradesh, India.
