= Sadat, Uttar Pradesh =

- Town
- Location in Uttar Pradesh, India Sadat, Uttar Pradesh (India)
- Coordinates: 25.68°N 83.28°E
- Country: India
- State: Uttar Pradesh
- District: Ghazipur
- Founder: Sahasra Gopati
- Elevation: 68 m (223 ft)

Population
  - Total: 22,090

Languages
  - Official: Hindi
  - Local: Bhojpuri
- Time zone: UTC+5:30 (IST)
- Vehicle registration: UP 61
- Website: up.gov.in

Sadat is a town and a nagar panchayat in Ghazipur district in the Indian state of Uttar Pradesh. It is the largest market (Bazaar) and only Nagar Panchayat in the Jakhanian Tehsil.

== Geography ==
Sadat is located at 25.68°N 83.28°E. It has an average elevation of 68 metres (223 feet).

== Demographics ==
As of the 2001 Census of India, Sadat had a population of 22,090 Which's highest in that Region. Males constitute 51% of the population and females 49%. Sadat has an average literacy rate of 67%, higher than the national average of 59.5%: male literacy is 77%, and female literacy is 57%. In Sadat, 18% of the population is under 6 years of age. Sadat divided into 11 wards. These names are - Ward No - 01 (Ambedkar Nagar), Ward No - 02 (Shastri Nagar), Ward No - 03 (Kalyan Nagar), Ward No - 04 (Deendayal Nagar), Ward No - 05 (Gandhi Nagar), Ward No - 06 (Shri Nagar), Ward No - 07 (Shaheed Nagar), Ward No - 08 (Azad Nagar), Ward No - 09 (Hedgewar Nagar), Ward No - 10 [Purani Bazar(Saiyadbada)], Ward No - 11 (Mahmoodpur Zunardar),
