= Bakainia =

- Village
- Bakainia
- Location of Bakainia in Uttar Pradesh
- Coordinates: 25.46378340468522°N 83.77501310192021°E
- Country: India
- State: Uttar Pradesh
- District: Ghazipur
- Established: 1780; 246 years ago

Government
  - Type: Gram panchayat
  - Body: Gram pradhan

Area
  - Total: 1.2469 km^{2} (0.4814 sq mi)
- Elevation: 72 m (236 ft)

Population (2011)
  - Total: 1,504

Languages
  - Official: Hindi/Urdu
- Time zone: UTC+5:30 (IST)
- PIN: 232326 to** (** area code)
- Vehicle registration: UP 61
- Climate: BW (Köppen)

Bakainia is a village of Ghazipur district, Uttar Pradesh, India. Bakiania was the part of Mania village but later was separated and was made another panchayat.
