= Tajpur, Ghazipur =

Tajpur
- Village
- Country: India
- State: Uttar Pradesh
- District: Ghazipur
- Established: 1700; 326 years ago

Government
  - Type: Panchayati Raj (India)
  - Body: Gram Pradhan

Area
  - Total: 188.62 ha (466.1 acres)
- Elevation: 70 m (230 ft)

Population (2011)
  - Total: 329
  - Density: 174/km^{2} (452/sq mi)

Languages
  - Official: Bhojpuri, Hindi, Urdu
- Time zone: UTC+5:30 (IST)
- PIN: 232326
- Telephone code: 05497
- Vehicle registration: UP 61

Tajpur is a village in Zamania tehsil of Ghazipur District, Uttar Pradesh, India. It was a part of Daudpur (Dewaitha) but later it was separated.
