= Athahatha =

Village in Uttar Pradesh, India

Athahatha village, Zamania, Ghazipur, Uttar Pradesh, India was established in 1799.
