= Daudpur, Kapurthala =

Daudpur
- Village
- Location in Punjab, India Daudpur (India)
- Coordinates: 31.560227°N 75.395138°E
- Country: India
- State: Punjab
- District: Kapurthala

Government
  - Body: Gram panchayat

Population (2011)
  - Total: 1,032
- Sex ratio 563/469♂/♀

Languages
  - Official: Punjabi
  - Other spoken: Hindi
- Time zone: UTC+5:30 (IST)
- PIN: 144624
- Telephone code: 01822
- ISO 3166 code: IN-PB
- Vehicle registration: PB-09
- Website: kapurthala.gov.in

Daudpur is a village in Kapurthala district of Punjab State, India. It is located 25 kilometres (16 mi) from Kapurthala, which is both district and sub-district headquarters of Daudpur. The village is administrated by a Sarpanch, who is an elected representative.

== Demography ==
According to the report published by Census India in 2011, Daudpur has a total number of 210 houses and population of 1,032 of which include 563 males and 469 females. Literacy rate of Daudpur is 79.11%, higher than state average of 75.84%. The population of children under the age of 6 years is 113 which is 10.95% of total population of Daudpur, and child sex ratio is approximately 738, lower than state average of 846.

== Caste ==
The village has schedule caste (SC) constitutes 29.46% of total population of the village and it doesn't have any Schedule Tribe (ST) population.

== Population data ==
Particulars	Total	Male	Female
Total No. of Houses	210	-	-
Population	1,032	563	469
Child (0-6)	113	65	48
Schedule Caste	304	171	133
Schedule Tribe	0	0	0
Literacy	79.11%	81.33%	76.48%
Total Workers	348	328	20
Main Worker	335	0	0
Marginal Worker	13	12	1

== Air travel connectivity ==
The closest airport to the village is Sri Guru Ram Dass Jee International Airport.
