= Tajpur Manjha =

- village
- Location in Uttar Pradesh, India Tajpur Manjha (India)
- Coordinates: 25.4593948°N 83.5602093°E
- Country: India
- State: Uttar Pradesh
- District: Ghazipur
- Talukas: Zamania
- Elevation: 76 m (249 ft)

Population (2011)
  - Total: 6,431

Languages
  - Official: Hindi
- Time zone: UTC+5:30 (IST)
- PIN: 232341
- Telephone code: +915497
- Vehicle registration: UP 61
- Sex ratio: 0.982 (2011) ♀/♂
- Nearest city: Ghazipur
- Lok Sabha constituency: Ghazipur
- Vidhan Sabha constituency: Zamania
- Website: zamania.co.in/Tajpurmanja.html

Tajpur Manjha is a village in Indian state of Uttar Pradesh, situated on the bank of the River Ganges. It is located in Zamania taluk of Ghazipur district.

== Demographics ==
Tajpur Manjha is a small village located in Zamania Tehsil of Ghazipur district, Uttar Pradesh with total 909 families residing. The Tajpur Manjha village has population of 6431 of which 3245 are males while 3186 are females as per 2011 Census of India.

In Tajpur Manjha village population of children with age 0-6 is 971 which makes up 15.10% of total population of village. Average Sex Ratio of Tajpur Manjha village is 982 which is higher than Uttar Pradesh state average of 912. Child Sex Ratio for the Tajpur Majha as per census is 885, lower than Uttar Pradesh average of 902.

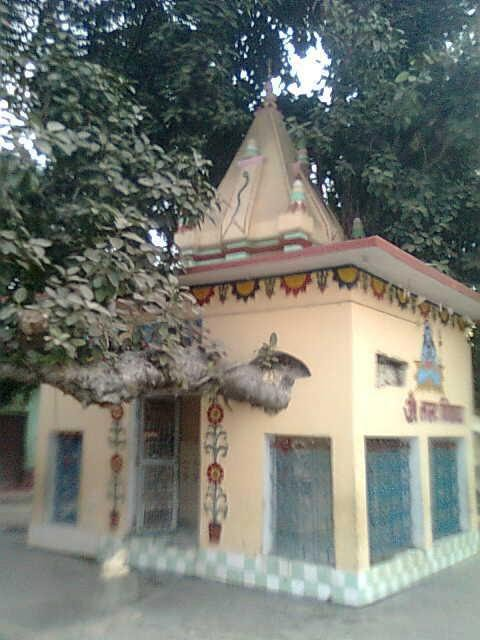
Lord Shiva Temple.

Tajpur Manjha village has higher literacy rate compared to Uttar Pradesh. In 2011, literacy rate of Tajpur Manjha village was 71.25% compared to 67.68% of Uttar Pradesh. In Tajpur Majha Male literacy stands at 81.06% while female literacy rate was 61.43%.

As per constitution of India and Panchayati raj Act, Tajpur Manjha village is administrated by Sarpanch (Head of Village) who is elected representative of village.

== Climate ==
Tajpur Manjha has a humid subtropical climate with large variations between summer and winter temperatures. Summers are long, from early April to October, with intervening monsoon seasons. Cold waves from the Himalayan region cause temperatures to dip across the city in the winter from December to February. The temperature ranges between 32–46 °C (90–115 °F) in the summers, and 3–15 °C (37–59 °F) in the winters. The average annual rainfall is 1,110 mm (44 in). Fog is common in the winters, while hot dry winds, called loo, blow in the summers.
