= Mirzabad, Ghazipur =

Coordinates: 25.564°N 83.873°E

Mirzabad is a village in Bhanwarkol Block in Ghazipur district of Uttar Pradesh in India. It is located about 35 kilometres (22 mi) to the east of Ghazipur City.
