= Mirzaabad-e Khayyat =

Mirzaabad-e Khayyat ميرزا آبادخياط
- Village
- Country: Iran
- Province: Lorestan
- County: Selseleh
- Bakhsh: Firuzabad
- Rural District: Firuzabad

Population (2006)
  - Total: 46
- Time zone: UTC+3:30 (IRST)
  - Summer (DST): UTC+4:30 (IRDT)

Mirzaabad-e Khayyat (Persian: ميرزا آبادخياط, also Romanized as Mīrzāābād-e Khayyāṭ) is a village in Firuzabad Rural District, Firuzabad District, Selseleh County, Lorestan Province, Iran. At the 2006 census, its population was 46, in 12 families.
