= Joga Musahib =

- Village
- Location in Uttar Pradesh, India Joga Musahib (India)
- Coordinates: 25.6705°N 83.8487°E
- Country: India
- State: Uttar Pradesh
- District: Ghazipur
- Settled: 1446
- Founder: Babu Ram Chandra Sharma

Population (2011)
  - Total: 6,000

Languages
  - Official: Hindi
- Time zone: UTC+5:30 (IST)
- PIN: 233233
- Telephone code: 05493
- Vehicle registration: UP-61
- Distance from New Delhi: 893 kilometres (555 mi) NW (land)
- Distance from Mumbai: 1,552 kilometres (964 mi) SW (land)
- Distance from Chennai: 1,896 kilometres (1,178 mi) SE (land)
- Distance from Kolkata: 713 kilometres (443 mi) (land)
- Climate: Cfa (Köppen)
- Precipitation: 980 millimetres (39 in)
- Avg. annual temperature: 32.0 °C (89.6 °F)
- Avg. summer temperature: 33.0 °C (91.4 °F)
- Avg. winter temperature: 5 °C (41 °F)

Joga Musahib is a village located in the Karail area of Mohammadabad tehsil in Ghazipur district in the Indian state of Uttar Pradesh. It had a population of 3,612 in the 2011 Census. Its local administration follows the Panchayati Raj system.

== History ==
Babu Ram Chandra Dikshit established the village in 1446 it was the time when alam shah sat on the throne of delhi as sultan of sayyid empire.He was one of the seventeen grandsons of Babu Nainan shah., Babu Ram Chandra Dikshit moved from Karimuddinpur to Joga Musahib.

Babu Nainan shah, the son of Prithuraj shah had 17 grandsons from his 2 sons each of them establish a village in karail region and this 17 village belt is known as "सतरहो" In the ghazipur district of eastern uttarpradesh

The Sataraho was a branch of the Kashyap Gotriya Kinwar Bhumihars. They are part of Kanyabubj Brahman Sakha. One of the young members of Babu Sangram Rai's family of Sonari, was a cavalry officer in the Tughulaq army. He acted bravely in the war against the Bengal rebels. For this bravery, he was awarded a jagir in Singhabad of the Malda district. Later, Raja Bhairvendra Narayan Rai of Singhabad (Malda) earned a reputation during the struggle for India's independence.

== Administration ==
Joga Musahib is part of the Mohammadabad assembly seat of Ballia Lok Sabha constituency. However, it is administered by Mohammadabad tehsil (township), under Ghazipur district.

Joga Musahib has its own Panchayat. The Sarpanch (Pradhan) of Joga is Shri Ramesh Rai.

== Transport ==
The village is nearly 33 km (21 mi) from Ghazipur city railway station and UP Roadways Ghazipur depot. Other nearby railway stations are Karimuddinpur, Yusufpur and Buxar. It is also accessible by road.

== Culture ==
The primary language is a mix of Bhojpuri and Hindi. Culturally, the area is greatly influenced by Ballia, which is a nearby cultural center.
