= Sadhopur, Ghazipur =

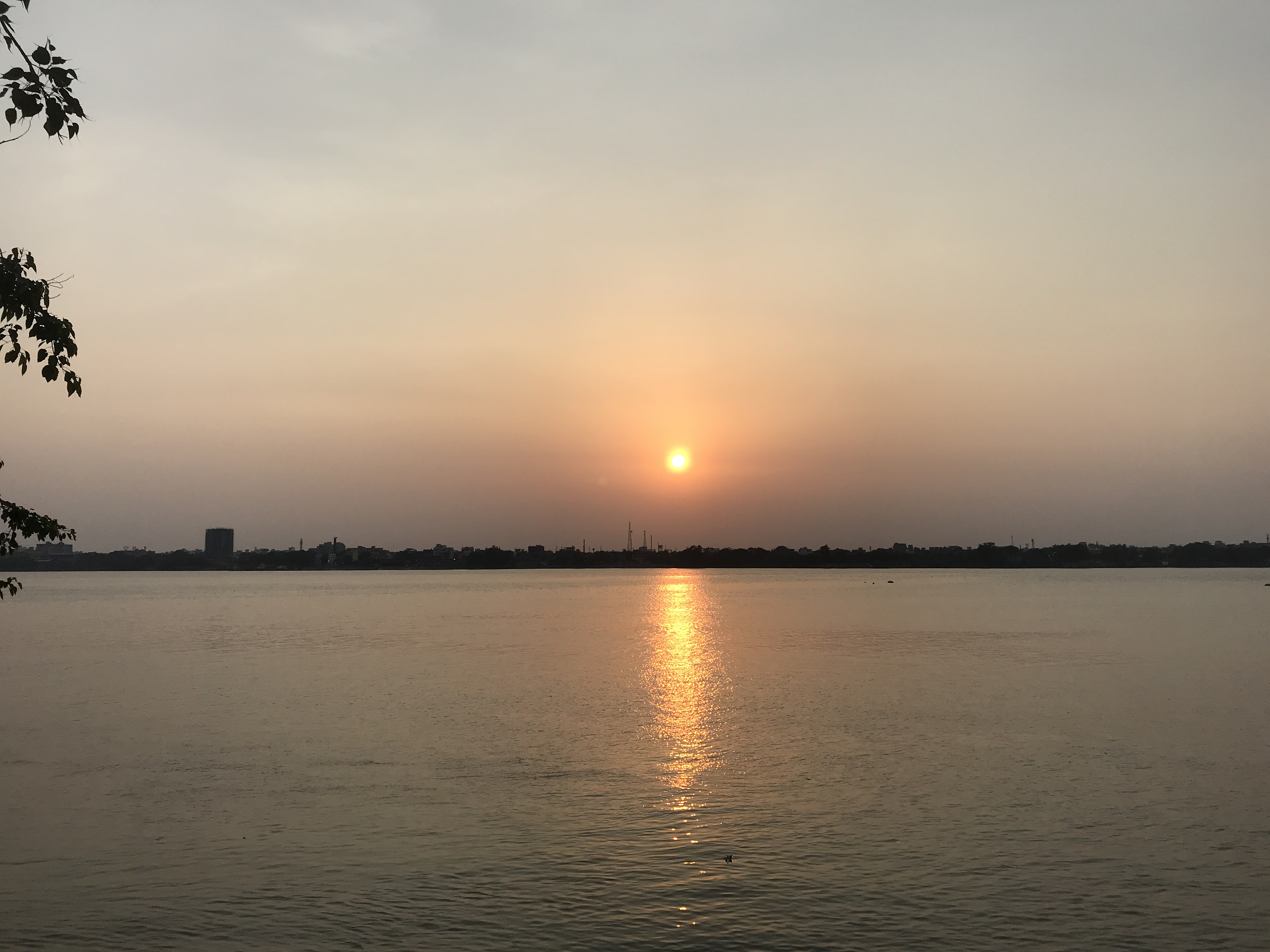
Maa ganga

Sadhopur also known as Rampur is a village in Ghazipur District of Uttar Pradesh, India.The village falls under the jurisdiction of the Reotipur Post Office, with the PIN code 232328, and is located in the Ghazipur district. The primary source of income for the residents is agriculture. The village is situated near the sacred Ganga(Ganges)River, adding to its cultural and spiritual significance.

The nearest markets to the village are Reotipur and Muhammadabad. A temporary bridge is constructed over the Ganga River between the village and Muhammadabad, which remains operational for six months of the year—from December to June. During the remaining six months, from June to December, the bridge is closed, and residents rely on boats to travel to Muhammadabad. As for commuting to Reotipur, villagers primarily use their personal vehicles, as there is no regular public transportation service available in the area.
