= Pakri, Ghazipur =

Pakari
- village
- Interactive map of Pakari
- Country: India
- State: Uttar Pradesh
- District: Ghazipur

Languages
  - Official: Hindi & Bhojpuri
- Time zone: UTC+5:30 (IST)
- Vehicle registration: UP-61
- Coastline: 0 kilometres (0 mi)

Pakari or Pakri, is a small village in the Ghazipur district of India. It is near the village of Reotipur. In the older colonial spelling, it is mentioned as "Puckry". There are other places called Pakri in India. Pakari village is located 10 (approx) km towards east from District headquarters Ghazipur on the UP State Highway No. 99 (SH-99) between villages Derhgawan and Reotipur, 366 km from State capital Lucknow.

Pakari's postal code is 232328 and postal head office is Reotipur. Ghazipur, Zamania, Ballia, Rasra are the nearby cities to Pakari. It is located at the border of the Ghazipur District and Buxar District (Bihar).
