= Kudva, Ghazipur =

Yadunagar Kudva Yadunagar, Ikara
- Village
- Yadunagar Kudva
- Location in Uttar Pradesh, India Yadunagar Kudva (India)
- Coordinates: 25.64°N 83.23°E
- Country: India
- State: Uttar Pradesh
- District: Ghazipur
- Established: 1835
- Founder: 3 Abhir/ Ahir brothers Shri Moti Gopta, Shri Kartar Gopta, Shri Sharda Gopta

Government
  - Type: Panchayati Raj
  - Body: Gramsabha
- Elevation: 73 m (240 ft)

Population
  - Total: 2,729

Languages
  - Official: Hindi
  - Local: Bhojpuri
- Time zone: UTC+5:30 (IST)
- Postal code: 233304
- Vehicle registration: UP 61
- Website: up.gov.in

Kudva or Yadunagar is a village in Sadat block, Ghazipur district in Uttar Pradesh. This village is settlemented in 1835 during long time famine in northern India because there was a very big pond in this area named 'Kud pond'. It belongs to Varanasi division. It is located 41 kilometres (25 mi) towards west from district headquarters Ghazipur, 10 kilometres (6.2 mi) from Sadat and 309 kilometres (192 mi) from state capital Lucknow.

== History ==
At the time of war between Skandagupta (a Abhir king of Gupt dynasty) and Huns, this place was the cantonment of Skandagupta's army. Skandagupta's army had also made a temporary construction at this place in 455–456, the remains of which remained till 1970 in the form of a huge wall about three kilometers long, which was from north to south direction from the heart of the present Kudva village. Gradually people destroyed that wall and occupied its land.

Even today, fragments of bricks of that wall are found at the time of digging deep in people's fields and lands and pieces of pottery are often found in the fields falling on the northern side of Kudva village. A part of that construction is still safe in the form of a huge well. The diameter of this well is about 5 meters. The huge pond of this village is also man-made, which never dries up.

For many centuries, this place was hidden in the forests and people again noticed it in 1835. From 1803 onwards, there was a drought in North India almost every second or third year. During the long famine of 1835, when all the ponds and wells dried up, three brothers of the Abhir caste (descendants of gupt kingdome) with the help of their domesticated elephants and horses, discovered a huge and deep pond of about 2500 square meters at this place, in spite of the severe famine. There was no effect and was completely filled with water. This huge pond was surrounded by forests on all sides.

Those three brothers named that huge pond 'Kund' and settled at this place. Due to the name 'Kund', this place was later named Kudva.

== Nearby Villages ==
- Makhadumpur
- Baragaon
- Kauda
- Gaura
- Devapar
- Satuhari
- Kaithwaliya
- Katyan

== Education ==
One government primary school, one government junior school, three high schools, two Intermediate Colleges (Shri Arjun Yadav Inter College and Shri Jokhan Janta Inter College) and two degree colleges are in this village.

- Total Literacy Rate%= 93.9%

== Administration ==
Mr. Manoj Singh Yadav is Gram Pradhan of Ikara (Kudva) now. Mr. Vipin Singh Yadav is BDC of this village.

== Healthcare ==
One healthcare dispensary is in this village.

== Transport ==
- Railway Station- Mahpur, Sadat, Aurihar
- Bus Stop- GreenLand bus stop, Makhadumpur bus stop
