= Hari Narayan Singh =

Indian wrestler (1864–1949)

Mahamalla Hari Narayan Rai
Personal information
- Born: 1864 Kundesar, Ghazipur, Uttar Pradesh, India
- Died: 4 June 1949 (aged 85) Varanasi, India

Professional wrestling career
- Ring name: Hari Narayan Rai
- Billed height: 6 ft 4 in (193 cm)

Mahamalla Hari Narayan Rai (1864 – 4 June 1949) is the ring-name of Indian wrestler Hari Narayan Rai.

== Early life ==
He was born in a family of Kinwar Bhumihars in Kundesar village in Ghazipur district of Uttar Pradesh family . His father Babu Krinamohan Rai was very fond of wrestling and he nurtured his son with great care. Though he didn't allow his son to participate in any tournaments or competitions but his rising fame of unimaginable regimen of exercises drew attention of renowned wrestlers of his time. The great Gama pehlwan was his contemporary. In those days he was a court wrestler of Datia Princely State. When he learned about Babu Harinarayan Rai encounter with a lion, he came to challenge him in akhara. However he couldn’t gather any courage when he saw his 95 kg exercising naal.

== Tough training ==
Mall Babu used to do five thousands squats and five thousands push-ups. Though it seems unimaginable but sports journalist Marcus Trower has mentioned it in his well researched book, "The most I heard anyone talk about a wrestler having done was 10,000 of each a day. This was Hari Narayan Rai, the wrestler who killed a lion in the 1880s whose story I tell."

== Encounter with a lion ==
In 1885, Babu Hari Narayan Rai was traveling to Vadodara Gujarat on a pilgrimage with his Purohit and Nayee. Due to lack of any transport facility in those days they were moving ahead on foot. After few miles they approached a road through dense forest where British sepoys warned them of danger ahead. They informed Mall babu about a man-eater in that area and suggested to take another route which was much longer. But Hari Narayan Rai didn't pay heed to their warning and moved forward with his companions. When they were in the middle of the jungle suddenly they heard the roar of lion. Mall babu told his Purohit and Nayee to climb on trees immediately and he started waiting for man-eater with a wrestler's prudence. Suddenly lion jumped on him and injured his shoulder ripping his flesh. But vigilant young wrestler got hold of his forelegs and hit him hard in spine. The lion roared and collapsed. His spine was broken and within few minutes he was gasping his last breath.

== Accomplished mridang player ==
Hari Narayan Rai was a mridang player who practised the instrument after exercising at the akhara. Musicians frequently visited the zamindar family of Kundesar, where Rai performed classical compositions in Rupak Taal and Teen Taal.

== Sharp memory ==
Babu Hari Narayan Rai was unlike the typical wrestlers of his time, who used to sleep all day after practicing in the akhara. He was a keen learner and a voracious reader. His memory was so remarkable that he memorized the entire text of the Shrimad Bhagavad Gita.

== Death and legacy ==
Mall Babu was such a disciplined person that he didn't fell ill in his lifetime. Till the age of 84 years his physique was in greater shape. However, in the age of 85 he got a premonition of his death and according to his wish he was shifted to holy city of Varanasi, where he died on 4 June 1949. Mall Babu had few disciples who carried forward his legacy. Rajnarayan Rai was his most favorite, who floored Imam Bakhs Pahalwan (younger brother of The Great Gama) in Jhariya (Jharkhand) within 5 minutes of bouts. Gama was so shocked with this defeat that he started crying.
