= Jevpur =

Village in Uttar Pradesh, India

Jevpur is a village located near the Ganga (Ganges) River in Uttar Pradesh, India. It comes under the Ghazipur (Loksabha) Parliamentary Constituency and the Zamania Legislative Assembly. It is about 8 kilometres (5.0 mi) distance from the town of Zamania, about 16 kilometres (9.9 mi) approx distance from Ghazipur, and 337 kilometres (209 mi) distant from Lucknow. The Ganga is on the village's western side and on its eastern side is a shrine to Shiva, locally called Maheshwar Nath Baba.

In Jevpur there is Shivaji Sporting Play ground beside the main road that is used for playing tournaments of district level and local games. janta Inter College just beside the play ground is there. This village is not so populated but castes live separately that is called "Toli". Mainly this village has many caste like Rajput Families, Yadavs, Harizans, Prajapati, Brahmans, etc. Newly built hanuman mandir on the bank of river ganga is the main attraction of tradition for the village people. Mainly people of village love to spend their time there in the evening. The temple was made by the efforts of 7 villages near and around Jevpur Like Mahewa, Tazpur, Deoria, Zamania, Khiddirpur, Mathare, Harpur.

This village is connected with the 45 kilometres (28 mi) long NH 97 highway Zamania is a major settlement lying along the highway in the state (NH 97) is a short National Highway in India entirely within the state of Uttar Pradesh. NH-97 runs for just 45 kilometres (28 mi) and connects Ghazipur with Saiyedraja (which is 25 kilometres (16 mi) east of Chandauli.
