= Shivpujan Rai =

Indian independence activist (1913–1942)

- Born: Shivpujan Rai; 1 March 1913; Sherpur, Ghazipur, United Provinces of Agra and Oudh, British India
- Died: 18 August 1942 (aged 29); Mohammadabad, Ghazipur, United Provinces, British India
- Other names: Doctor Sahib
- Occupation: Independence activist
- Organization: Indian National Congress
- Known for: Indian independence movement

Dr. Shivpujan Rai (1 March 1913 – 18 August 1942) was an Indian independence activist. During the 1942 Quit India Movement, under Rai's leadership, a group of independence fighters hoisted the tricolor flag of India at Mohammadabad Tehsil. In doing so, Shivpujan Rai, Rishishewar Rai, Vans Narayan Rai, Ram Badan Upadhyay, Raj Narayan Rai, Narayan Rai, Vashishtha Narain Rai and Bans Narain Rai sacrificed their life for India's independence on 18 August 1942. All of them are known as the Ashta Shaheed (Eight Martyrs) of Sherpur.

== Biography ==
Shivpujan Rai was born in a Bhumihar family on 1 March 1913 in Sherpur, Ghazipur. He was elected as General Secretary of the District Congress Committee in 1942.

== Martyrdom at Mohammadabad ==
During the Quit India movement, Rai led a group of young independence activists to the tehsil headquarters at Mohammadabad and tried to hoist the tricolour at the tehsil building. He was warned by armed British officers, but Rai moved forward with the tricolour in his hand. Tehsildar fired on Rai with his service revolver. After receiving five bullets in the chest, Rai died at the age of 29.
