= Jakhania =

Coordinates: 25°42′N 82°15′E

Jakhania or Jakhanian is a tehsil in Ghazipur district of Uttar Pradesh, India. Bedi Ram is the MLA of Jakhania. Jakhania station is located 70 km (43 mi) northeast of Varanasi. There are several educational institutions located in Jakhania. Its pin code is 275203.
