= Saidpur, Ghazipur =

Saidpur
- Town
- Location in Uttar Pradesh, India Saidpur (India)
- Coordinates: 25.55°N 83.18°E
- Country: India
- State: Uttar Pradesh
- District: Ghazipur

Government
  - MLA: Ankit Bharti (Samajwadi Party)

Area
  - Total: 5.21 km^{2} (2.01 sq mi)
- Elevation: 70 m (230 ft)

Population (2011)
  - Total: 24,338
  - Density: 4,670/km^{2} (12,100/sq mi)

Languages
  - Official: Hindi
- Time zone: UTC+5:30 (IST)
- Vehicle registration: UP-61
- Website: https://saidpur.bharat.help

Saidpur is a town and a nagar panchayat in the Ghazipur district of the Indian state of Uttar Pradesh with the pin code 233304. The nearest railway station is in Aunrihar Junction. Aunrihar is a main hub for travelling, business, politicians and the site of the Temple of Varah-Bhagwan.

== Geography ==
Saidpur is located at 25.55°N 83.18°E. It has an average elevation of 70 metres (229 feet). NH 31 passes through the town and links it to Ghazipur and Varanasi. It is one of the important markets of Ghazipur district.

== Demographics ==
As of 2011 India census, Saidpur had a population of 24,338 of which 12,716 are males while 11,622 are females. Males constituted 53% of the population and females 47%. Saidpur has an average literacy rate of 59%, lower than the national average of 59.5%. Male literacy is 68%, and female literacy is 49%. In Saidpur, 17% of the population is under six years of age.
