= Kundesar =

Kundesar Koresar Kabirpur
- Village
- Location in Uttar Pradesh, India Kundesar (India)
- Coordinates: 25.6011648°N 83.8080417°E
- Country: India
- State: Uttar Pradesh
- District: Ghazipur

Languages
  - Official: Hindi
- Time zone: UTC+5:30 (IST)
- PIN: 233227
- Telephone code: 05493
- Vehicle registration: UP-61
- Distance from New Delhi: 890 kilometres (550 mi) NW (land)
- Distance from Mumbai: 1,552 kilometres (964 mi) SW (land)
- Distance from Chennai: 1,892 kilometres (1,176 mi) SE (land)
- Distance from Kolkata: 715 kilometres (444 mi) (land)
- Climate: Cfa (Köppen)
- Precipitation: 980 millimetres (39 in)
- Avg. annual temperature: 32.0 °C (89.6 °F)
- Avg. summer temperature: 33.0 °C (91.4 °F)
- Avg. winter temperature: 05 °C (41 °F)

Kundesar is a village in Ghazipur district, Uttar Pradesh. It has a population of 4602 according to the 2011 Census. Having a history of five hundred years, this village has rich heritage of the Kinwar clan. Kundesar has had special mention in the gazettes of Ghazipur since 1781. Kundesar is located on the Ghazipur–Patna National Highway 19.

== History ==
Kundesar was established by Raja Bhairav Dikshit's eldest grandson, Taluqdar Babu Madhav Rai, in the year 1507 A.D on the bank of river Ganga. In the fifth generation of Raja Mulhan Dikshit, Raja Bhairo Dikshit was the last person who migrated from Sahamadih to Gondaur. There he built a fort. According to genealogical records, Kashyap gotriya 'Kinwar' Dikshit Brahman's warrior family uprooted Cheru tribal rulers from Gadhipuri and the surrounding area after a series of battles fought for Gahadavalas. Dikshit Brahmins and Gahadvalas both came to Kannauj from Dakshinapatha. In an edict of Gahadavala King Chandradeva, it is mentioned that he got hold of Gadhipuri near the holy city of Kashi with the help of Dikshit Brahmin warriors. The leading role of 'Mulhan Dikshit' in the Gahadvala military campaign is described in 'Sri pothi bansauri' in detail. As a goodwill gesture Gahadvala King conferred him the title of 'Raja' along with a grant of seven hundred villages across Azamgarh, Mau, Ballia and Ghazipur districts. Later on the clan flourished in three main branches i.e. Birpur, Gondaur and Karimuddinpur.

In British raj Kudesar's Babu Girija Prasad Narayan Rai estate consisted of 37 shares in Mohammadabad paragana and one in Zahurabad, with an area of approximately 2,000 acres and a revenue demand of Rs. 3,028.

Vijay Shankar Rai represented Mohammedabad assembly as Member of Legislative Assembly constituency since 1952 till 1985 continuously, with a gap of one term in between.

== Agriculture ==
Though a number of people from this village have been in government services earning laurels to the village, agriculture is the main source of income and livelihood for the majority of the residents. Nearly all types of food grains, which is cultivated in eastern UP, is also produced here. Popular crops include wheat, paddy and potatoes as well as other crops such as mustard and lentils. Grams are also produced in large quantities. The village has privately owned rice mills and oil mills. Farmers often sell their products either in the local market or in the anaj mandi (government food grains store house) located in Yusufpur. Farming is done with semi modern and semi classical techniques. Tractors and electrical water pump sets are used for farming. Bigger machines like harvesters are also used in the village.

== Language and culture ==
The language spoken by the majority in the village is a mix of Bhojpuri and Hindi, although Urdu also has a great influence on it. Culturally the area is much influenced by Varanasi which is a major cultural centre nearby. On the occasion of Kartik Purnima, a fair i.e. 'Chatani Dadari Mela' is held by the villagers every year.

== Notable residents ==
- Hari Narayan Rai

== Nearby places ==
- Ghazipur
- Gondaur
- joga Mushahib
- Ballia
- Buxar
- Varanasi
- Mughalsarai
- Patna
- Sherpur, Ghazipur
- Yusufpur
