= Mohammadabad, Ghazipur =

Mohammadabad
- Town
- Location in Uttar Pradesh, India
- Coordinates: 25°37′22″N 83°45′27″E
- Country: India
- State: Uttar Pradesh
- District: Ghazipur

Government
  - Type: Nagar Palika Parishad

Area
  - Total: 6.35 km^{2} (2.45 sq mi)

Population (2011)
  - Total: 38,328
  - Density: 6,040/km^{2} (15,600/sq mi)
- Demonym: Mohammadabadi

Languages
  - Official: Hindi
- Time zone: UTC+5:30 (IST)
- PIN: 233227
- Vehicle registration: UP-61
- Sex ratio: 0.909 (2011) ♂/♀

Yusufpur Mohammadabad is a town and a Township in Ghazipur district in the Indian state of Uttar Pradesh. Haydaria village near Mohammadabad is the starting point of Purvanchal Expressway (Lucknow to Ghazipur).

== Demographics ==
As of 2001 India census, Mohammadabad had a population of 38,328. Males constitute 52% of the population and females 48%. Mohammadabad has an average literacy rate of 78.03%, higher than the state average of 67.68%; male literacy is 84.60%, and female literacy is 70.81%. In Mohammadabad, 14.73% of the population is under 6 years of age.

Religions in Mohammadabad
Religion	Percent
Hindus	55.41%
Muslims	44.09%
Sikhs	0.30%
Others†	0.20%

Muhammadabad market is known for business. Yusufpur-Mohammadabad is a twin town in the Ghazipur district of Uttar Pradesh, India. This town is a business hub for the nearby districts like Ballia, Mau, and Buxar. Yusufpur has a railway station which lies on the railway line linking Varanasi to Chhapra via Ghazipur and Ballia in the North Eastern Railway Zone.

== Overview ==
Mohammadabad is situated on the Ghazipur–Patna National Highway 19. It is also located beside the Ghazipur–Ballia state highway. Many of the politicians representing Ghazipur area belong to this town.

== Notable personalities ==
- Dr. Mukhtar Ahmed Ansari
- Dr. Shivpujan Rai
- Mangla Rai
- Hari Narayan Singh
- Rai
- Sinha
- Alka Rai
- Dr. Sri Govind Rai, medical practitioner and social worker
