= Ghazipur district =

District in Uttar Pradesh, India

- District of Uttar Pradesh
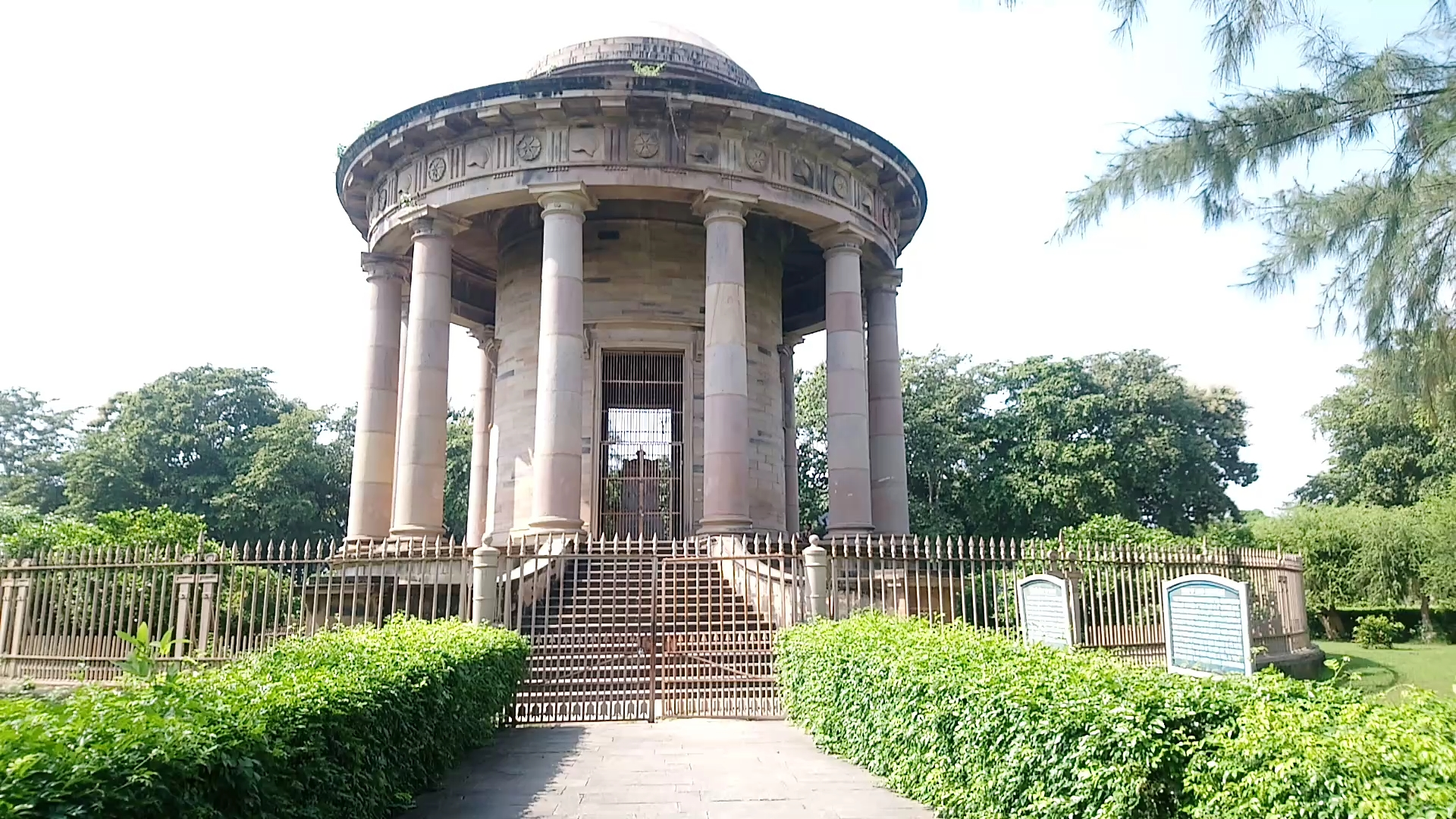
- Tomb of Lord Cornwallis in Ghazipur

- Location of Ghazipur (Gadhipur) district in Uttar Pradesh
- Coordinates (Ghazipur): 25.61°N 83.57°E
- Country: India
- State: Uttar Pradesh
- Division: Varanasi
- Incorporated: 1 January 1879
- Headquarters: Ghazipur
- Tehsils: Ghazipur; Mohammadabad; Zamania; Jakhania; Kasimabad; Seorai; Saidpur

Government
  - District Magistrate: Ashwani kumar, IAS
  - Lok Sabha constituencies: Ghazipur
  - Member of Parliament, Lok Sabha: Afzal Ansari

Area
  - Total: 3,377 km^{2} (1,304 sq mi)

Population (2011)
  - Total: 3,620,268
  - Estimate (2021): 4,210,000
  - Density: 1,072/km^{2} (2,777/sq mi)
  - Urban: 434,697

Demographics
  - Literacy: 74.46%.
  - Sex ratio: 951
  - Language: Hindi • Urdu
- Time zone: UTC+05:30 (IST)
- Vehicle registration: UP-61
- Major highways: NH-29; NH-19; NH-97; SH-36; SH-67; SH-69; SH-99
- Average annual precipitation: 1109 mm
- Website: Official Website

Ghazipur district is a district of Uttar Pradesh state in northern India. The city of Ghazipur is the district headquarters. The district is part of Varanasi Division. The region of Ghazipur is famous mainly for the production of its unique rose-scented Spray called Gulab Jal, and for the tomb of the Governor General of British India, Lord Cornwallis, who died here. His tomb is situated in Western part of City, and is conserved by Archaeological Survey of India.

== History ==
=== Early history ===
The district has derived its name from its headquarters town of Ghazipur. It was during the reign of Harsha, a Chinese pilgrim known with the name of Xuanzang came to the district. And in his days the place was known as Chen- Chu interpreting in English as the Kingdom of the lord of 'Battles' which has been given various nomenclatures like Yudhpatipura, Yudharanpura, Garzapatipura and the last one probably who the modern Ghazipur as adopted by Lord Cunninghum. The Chinese pilgrim Xuanzang had stated that a stupa was erected by Ashoka in the memory of Buddha who had been here in the district. Regarding the nomenclature of Ghazipur there has also been a version that it has its derivation from the word "Ghadi", who happened to be a Hindu king in the 9th century the original name of the place was Gadhipura. But, Gandhipura was located little far from the present city of Ghazipur.

According to one story Raja Mandhata was said to have been an heir (descendant) of Prithvi Raj of Delhi and was suffering from a skin disease and wanted to get rid of the affliction by bathing in the tank at Kathot. He did take bath under the direction of Brahmins and cured sometimes later. After overcoming his disease he settled in Ghazipur and built a fort. Subsequently, his nephew and his successors seized a Muslim girl whose mother got worried for her daughter and as a measure for the safety of her daughter, she appealed to the sultan of Delhi, with the result that a band of forty ghazis under the headship of Ghazi Saiyad Mausaud reached Kathot and captured the fort and slew Raja Mandhata and his nephew. Thus the Ghazis got charge of the area and where Masud is supposed traditionally to have founded a city in 1330 commemorating his newly acquired title of Malik-Us-Sadal Ghazi. He established a new city near to the old Gandhipura and the place got name Ghazipur.

The region covered by the present district of Ghazipur once formed part of the ancient kingdom of Kashi, a famous centre of Aryan civilization. The ancient history of Ghazipur can, therefore, be pieced out from that of Kashi. Archaeological finds of Saidpur–Aurihar and Bhitri also proved that it is related to an oldest time. The Chinese pilgrim Xuanzang (630 to 644) visited and described this place. A legend states that the Jamadagani Rishi lived near to the present day Zamania town with his wife. According to the Mahabharat, Haihaya king Kartivirya came to residence of Jamadagni Rishi, after hospitality, he had taken Kamdhenu by force, but Parshuram son of Jamadagani Rishi overcome him and Kamdhenu was recovered. Kartivirya offered a sacrifice in atonement of his sin.

The early political history of this region is complex, Purans and Mahabharat, classical Sanskrit texts, the early Jain and Buddhist texts have given information in this regard. The Jains also testify to the greatness of the region under Kashi king Ashwasena as the father of Tirthankara Parshvanath. During the two or three centuries preceding the birth of Mahavira and the Buddha, the whole of northern India was divided into sixteen principal states known in early Buddhist and Jain literatures as the Solah Mahajanpada. The kingdom of Kashi was predominant in this period and covered the present district of Ghazipur. During the 8th and 7th centuries B.C. Kashi and Kosala fought against each other, which is stated in the Jatakas, early in the sixth century, Kashi kingdom completely collapsed in its struggle with Kosala. After the fall of the Kanvas (27 BC) Kashi seems to have been occupied by the Vatsas of Kaushambi. In the last of first century A.D. the Kushanas had established a state kingdom in the greater part of the northern India. Kushans rules came to end in the beginning of 3rd century in this region and a branch of Nagas, Bharashiva took the region in their hand. For nearly two centuries (from about 325 to 535 AD) this region formed part of the Gupta Empire. Chandragupta I (320–355 AD), Samundragupta, Chandragupta, Vikramaditya (376–415 AD), Kumargupta (415–455 AD), Skandagupta ruled over this region. In the middle of sixth century the Yashodharman of Malwa, the district had come under his meteoric sovereignty after which it passed under the rule of the Maukharis of Kannauj. In the first half of the 7th century A.D. it had come under the Harsha, after the death of Harsha it had gone to the hand of Yashovarman of Kannau (690–740 AD). In 770 AD the district had gone to the Dharampala, king of Bengal and there after Devapala (810–850 AD). After him it gone under Bhojadeva (Cen. 836–882 AD) Pratihara king of Kannauj. About the close of the tenth century the hold of Bhojadeva’s hold of Kannauj on Ghazipur became nominal. There after it had gone under the Pal king Mahipala I (992- 1040 AD), after him, it had gone to the Kalchuri or Chedi king Gangeyadeva (1015–1041). It was during the early part of this period that India suffered from the invasions of Mahmud Ghazni who sacked Kannauj in 1019. Chandradeva, the founder of the Gahadvala dynasty who was, about 1090, occupied this region and Kannauj. His son Madanpala (1100–1114) and his son Govind Chandra (1114–1154) and his son Vijay Chandra (1154–1170) ruled over this region.

=== Medieval history ===
Iltutmish conquered the region between 1210 and 1214 during his years as governor of Budaun. In 1322, it gone to the hand of Muhammad Bin Tughlaq and his successor Firoz Shah. In 1394 Khwaja Jahan in charge of Jaunpur government including the Ghazipur region, became independent and established Jaunpur Sultanate, the Ghazipur remained under it till 1479, when Bahlul Lodi defeated its last ruler Sultan Husain and conquered the Jaunpur Sultanate, his successor Sikandar Lodi gave administration of Jaunpur to the hand of Mubarak Khan in which time the Ghazipur took good place. Sikandar Lodi died on 21 November 1517, and Ibrahim Lodi was crowned, his younger brother Jalal Khan declared himself king of Jaunpur and remained independent for a considerable time.

After the battle of Panipat (21 April 1526), the rule of Lodi dynasty came to an end Babur became the ruler of Delhi. He sent Humayun to the east. He came to Jaunpur and punished Nasir Khan and obliged him to flee from Ghazipur, which came into Humayun possession, but he short stayed here as he was recalled by the Emperor Babur to fight against Rajputs and Afghans. District was soon recaptured by the Afghans, so Babur left Agra on 20 January 1529 and reached Ghazipur. Soon after his return Babur died and his successor Humayun had come to the east where Afghan was rising in which Sher Shah was also included. Humayun had defeated all Afghans including Sher Khan ( Sher Shah) and by an agreement the Chunar Fort gave to him by Humayun. In 1539, the district once again fell to the Afghan under Sher Khan who defeated Humayun at Chausa and assumed the title of Sher Shah at Varanasi. Kam Dev's brother name as Dham Dev who lived at Maa khamakhya Dham near Gahmar also helped Sher Shah Suri in the battle of Chausa. Ghazipur had gone to the house of Sur.

In the meanwhile Humayun reoccupied his lost kingdom but died soon after. His young son, Akbar, made himself the master of Hindustan after the battle of Panipat. The Afghans continued to hold sway in the east, including this district till 1559, Ali Quli Khan urf Khan Zaman subdued the region for his young sovereign and founded the town of Zamania, bringing the district of Ghazipur into his possession. In early 1565, Khan Zaman rebelled against Akbar, then Akbar crushed him and the government of Ghazipur was then given to Munim Khan Khan-i-Khanan who administered his territories with great success for many years. After Munim Khan the charge was Given to Sarkar Dewan Raja Quttul Khan jagirdar during late rule of Akbar in 1600 and then to Quttul's cousin, Daud Khan. Quttul Khan was a Sarkar or Governor of Ghazipur Sarkar, Dewan a Jagirdar of Ghazipur. After the death of Quttul his cousin handled all the post. Both brother belonged to Kamsar region of Ghazipur which back then was a large Raja Zamindarana estate and had many jagirs under it during Mughal and Nawab times. In Akbar's time the Ghazipur government had great importance. After the death of Aurangzeb in 1707, as his successor Bahadur Shah I he brought Ghazipur directly under his sway. During Aurangzeb a large part of Ghazipur and Kamsar-O-Bar jagirs were given to Raja Deendar Khan, the founder of Dildarnagar.

=== Nawabs period ===
A considerable change occurred in this area when Sadat Ali Khan was made subedar of Avadh in 1722. Ghazipur thus passed under the sway of the Nawab of Awadh. Sadat Ali Khan's first control of this region was under Mir Rustam Ali Khan, but later in 1738, the Ghazipur had its Nawab name as Nawab Sheikh Abdullah and later his son Nawal Fazl Ali Khan. Sheikh Abdullah's family were originally the rulers of Qasimabad Estate. It's was during the time the nawabs that area saw a boom in its growth and development, they also build many monuments here, like Imambara, Mosque, Nawabganj Palace, Nawab Kila burzi, chihal satun, and Qasimabad Fort, etc.. After the defeat of combined armies of Avadh, emperor, Mir Qasim, and administrator of Ghazipur Balwant Singh against British battle at Buxar (23 October 1764) a treaty made between Shah Alam and British at Varanasi on 29 October, whereby the province of Banaras including Ghazipur was transferred to East India Company. In 1765, an agreement made between Robert Clive and Shuja-ud-Daula whereby the latter agreed to restore the territory of Ghazipur to Balwant Singh. After death of Balwant Singh on 23 August 1770, his son Chait Singh succeeded. In September 1773, the confirmation of Chait Singh in his paternal state was made by the Shuja-ud-Daula in presence of Warren Haistings. In 1775, a treaty between Asaf-ud-Daula and East India Company was made by which Ghazipur to cede to the company but the administrative power of Chait Singh remained much the same as before. But in 1781 he was deposed.

=== British era ===
The administrative controls were transferred from a deposed Raja Chait Singh to the resident by the revenue policy of Jonathan Dunean. A police force was established at Ghazipur and by 1787 its control was vested in the newly appointed judge. Reforms were initiated by the legislation of 1795 and most important event is the constitution of Ghazipur district in 1818. In 1858, Ghazipur came under direct control of British. But the British also had to face a large rebel on 6th Jun 1858 by Sikarwar Bhumihars, under the leadership of Meghar Singh of Gahmar, and rebels by Kamsaar Pathans like under the leadership of Raja Khuda Bhaksh Khan of Dewaitha and other chiefs of the villages. Kunwar Singh and Amar Singh of Jagdishpur also influenced the region. Meghar Singh personally presented Amar Singh with a nazrana or gift worth Rs 20,000. During the mutiny the garrison at Ghazipur, however was the 65th native infantry which had returned from Burma but had not been affected by the representatives of the rebel leaders. In spite of the bad example set in other stations the men remained loyal to the British. The company also established an opium factory in the main city of Ghazipur in year 1820.

== Demographics ==
Historical population
Year	Pop.	±% p.a.
1853	949,650	—
1865	811,237	−1.30%
1872	786,138	−0.45%
1881	912,206	+1.67%
1891	970,029	+0.62%
1901	857,830	−1.22%
1911	788,298	−0.84%
1921	781,333	−0.09%
1931	824,721	+0.54%
1941	985,081	+1.79%
1951	1,140,932	+1.48%
1961	1,321,578	+1.48%
1971	1,531,654	+1.49%
1981	1,944,669	+2.42%
1991	2,416,617	+2.20%
2001	3,037,582	+2.31%
2011	3,620,268	+1.77%

Religions in Ghazipur district (2011)
Religion	Percent
Hinduism	89.32%
Islam	10.17%
Other or not stated	0.41%

According to the 2011 census Ghazipur district has a population of 3,620,268, roughly equal to the nation of Lithuania or the US state of Oklahoma. This gives it a ranking of 79th in India (out of a total of 640). Out of the total population males are 1,856,584 and females are 1,766,143. The area of the district is 3,378 km^{2} and it constitute 1.82% of the population of Uttar Pradesh. It has a population density of 1,072 inhabitants per square kilometre (2,780/sq mi). Its population growth rate over the decade 2001–2011 was 19.26%. Ghazipur has a sex ratio of 951 females for every 1,000 males, and a literacy rate of 74.27% (higher than the national average of 74.04%). Male literacy is 85.77% and female literacy is 62.29%. Scheduled Castes and Scheduled Tribes made up 20.07% and 0.79% of the population respectively. 92.44% of the total population is rural and 7.56% is urban. Out of the total population of 3,622,727, rural population is 3,348,855 and urban population is 273,872 (7.56%). Average literacy of rural population is 73.62% and that of urban population is 82.05%.

=== Languages ===
Languages in Ghazipur district (2011)
1. Bhojpuri (66.2%)
2. Hindi (31.0%)
3. Urdu (2.80%)
4. Others (0.06%)

At the time of the 2011 Census of India, 66.16% of the population in the district spoke Bhojpuri, 30.98% Hindi and 2.80% Urdu as their first language.

The language of the district is Bhojpuri, although some write their language as Hindi. The Bhojpuri variant of Kaithi is the indigenous script of Bhojpuri language.

=== Local media ===
Major English, Hindi and Urdu dailies including The Times of India, Hindustan Times, The Hindu, Dainik Jagran, Amar Ujala, Hindustan, and Rashtree Sahara are available in the city. Many major Hindi TV news channels have stringers there.

== Geography ==
Ghazipur District is present in the sub-tropical region and it is best known for rice and rose cultivation. The district is also famous for Black rice. The district forms the border of Uttar Pradesh and Bihar. Rivers in the district include the Ganges, Gomati, Gaangi, Beson, Magai, Bhainsai, Tons and Karmanasa River.
