= Reotipur, Uttar Pradesh =

Reotipur
- Village
- Nickname: Dalpatpur
- Location in Uttar Pradesh, India Reotipur (India)
- Coordinates: 25.5384285°N 83.7055891°E
- Country: India
- State: Uttar Pradesh
- District: Ghazipur
- Tehsil: Seorai
- Established: 1530; 496 years ago
- Founder: Maharaja Kamdev Singh

Government
  - Type: Panchayati raj (India)
  - Body: Gram panchayat

Area
  - Total: 3,405.48 ha (8,415.1 acres)
- Demonym: Revtipuri

Languages
  - Official: Hindi
  - Other spoken: Bhojpuri
- Time zone: UTC+5:30 (IST)
- Pin code: 232328
- Telephone code: 05497
- Vehicle registration: UP-61
- Website: up.gov.in

Reotipur is a historic village located in the Ghazipur district of Uttar Pradesh, India. Situated approximately 18 km from the district headquarters, Reotipur is known for its rich cultural heritage and traditional rural charm.

As an ancient habitation, Reotipur has a deep-rooted history that reflects the broader historical and cultural developments of the region. It is characterized by flood plains of Ganga river and lush green fields and is home to a diverse population engaged primarily in agriculture and local crafts.

The village is renowned for its annual Dusshera festival, featuring football tournament, wrestling competitions, plays and dramas. Over the years, Reotipur has maintained its traditional ways of life while gradually adapting to modern changes. The village exemplifies a blend of historic charm and contemporary growth, making it a notable location in the Ghazipur district. With a population of 26,597 (2011 population census), it is the largest village in terms of population of the Ghazipur district.

== History ==
=== Ancient and Medieval ===
Reotipur's location along the banks of the Ganges River has historically made it a favorable site for human habitation. Its proximity to the river provided a steady water supply and fertile soil for agriculture, essential for sustaining a stable settlement.

A well-known legend in Reotipur recounts a miraculous event involving a group of sadhus (Hindu ascetics) passing through the village. While traveling, the sadhus' elephants stopped at a particular spot and refused to move further, which the sadhus interpreted as a divine sign. In response, they performed tapasya (meditation and penance) at the location and established a shrine dedicated to Maa Bhagawati. The shrine became a revered religious site, deeply integrated into the village's cultural and spiritual life.

Significant changes occurred in the region during the period of Islamic invasions from the northwest of India, which began in the 12th century. These invasions led to waves of Hindu migration from the affected northern and northwestern areas.

In 1707, Puran Mal and his brothers fought on the side of Muhammad Azam Shah at Battle of Jajau and on the defeat of that prince, migrated to this district, settling at Mania in the Zamania pargana, while one brother took up his abode at Tahwa, another went to Ramaval and became a Musalman, and a third came to Suhwal, his descendants acquiring that village and Gaura. Puran Mal had three wives: from the first come the Musalman Sakarwars of Usia and seven other villages; and from the second the owners of Basuka, a large village adjoining Nawali on the east. At that time Sherpur-Reotipur, then called Qariat Reotipur, was hold in equal shares by Kastwars and Nais, the whole of Qariat Reotipur (Sherpur & Reotipur pargana) was spread across 29843 acres in 1901. The latter being ill-treated by the former sold their share to Puran Mal, who came to Reotipur and there murdered all the Kastwar males by an act of the foulest treachery. The Brahman priests of the Kastwars were won over by grants of lands in Reotipur, which still remain in their possession. Before his death Puran Mal divided his property among his sons by his third wife, giving a double share to the eldest son Sahajmal Rai and a single portion of eleven mouza in each case to each of the others; but subsequently the heirs of Sahajmal took forcible possession of the greater part of the estate, leaving only an insignificant portion in the hands of the others.

== Geography ==
Reotipur is located in the Ghazipur district of Uttar Pradesh, India, situated at the coordinates 25.5375° N, 83.7122° E. The town is surrounded by the nearby towns of Gahmar, Bhadaura, and Suhwal, and lies on the flat terrain formed by the meandering Ganga River, which has influenced the landscape by changing its course over time.

=== Topography ===
The terrain of Reotipur is predominantly flat, shaped largely by the Ganga River's historical changes in course. This has resulted in fertile lands that are ideal for agriculture, although the region is also prone to seasonal flooding during the monsoon.

=== Climate ===
Reotipur experiences a tropical monsoon climate, characterized by a humid subtropical climate with dry winters. The area receives substantial rainfall during the monsoon season, which often leads to flooding, affecting both agriculture and daily life in the village.

=== Soil and Agriculture ===
The soil in Reotipur is primarily Loamy with deep clay loam to silty clay loam, featuring a 1-3% slope. The area benefits from medium rainfall, and irrigation is supported by canals and tubewells. However, the soil health has been deteriorating due to the overuse of chemical fertilizers and the neglect of crop rotation, leading to low nitrogen and organic carbon levels. Awareness programs promoting natural farming practices have been introduced to address these issues.

The village's agricultural output includes wheat, rice, lentils, gram, vegetables, and bananas, making it a vital contributor to the local economy.

=== Flora and Fauna ===
Reotipur is home to a variety of vegetation, including mango trees, bamboo, and neem. The region also supports diverse wildlife, with species such as deer, nilgai (blue bull), wild boar, and siyar (jackal) commonly found in the area.

=== Water Bodies ===
Reotipur is located approximately 5 kilometers from the Ganga River, a major waterway that influences the region's agriculture and ecology. The village also has several ponds, such as Piparpatiya ka Pokhra and Tijiya ke Pokhra, which are significant for local festivals like Chhath Pooja. Additionally, large nalas (drainage channels) on the outskirts of the village serve as conduits for sewage. To the west of the village lies a narrow lagoon, which is a remnant of the river Ganga's former course.

=== Infrastructure ===
Reotipur is well-connected to the district via State Highway SH99. The village is also linked to nearby Gahmar village through local roads, facilitating transportation and trade within the region.

== Demographics ==
As of the 2011 Population Census, Reotipur is a large village in the Ghazipur district of Uttar Pradesh, consisting of 3,457 families and a total population of 26,597. The population is predominantly male, with 14,105 males and 12,492 females, resulting in an average sex ratio of 886, which is slightly lower than the Uttar Pradesh state average of 912. The village has a child population (age 0–6) of 3,592, making up 13.51% of the total population. The child sex ratio in Reotipur stands at 839, also lower than the state average of 902.

Reotipur boasts a higher literacy rate compared to the state average. In 2011, the literacy rate in the village was 78.09%, surpassing the Uttar Pradesh average of 67.68%. Male literacy in Reotipur is particularly high at 85.82%, while female literacy stands at 69.43%.

=== Languages ===
The primary language spoken in Reotipur is Bhojpuri, with Hindi and Urdu also widely spoken among the residents. These languages reflect the cultural and linguistic diversity of the village.

=== Religion ===
Hinduism is the predominant religion in Reotipur, with over 95% of the population adhering to it. Islam is the second-largest religion in the village. The religious landscape includes significant institutions such as the Thakurbari Gurukul of the Vaishnava sect and the Madrasa of Badi Masjid, which provides primary Islamic teachings.

=== Occupation ===
Agriculture remains the mainstay of the economy in Reotipur, with many residents engaged in farming and related activities. Other common occupations include retail businesses, craftsmanship, and animal husbandry. The village is also home to a rice mill and an ice cream factory, which contribute to the local economy.

=== Caste and Community Structure ===
Reotipur's population is predominantly composed of Brahmins, Bhutt Brahmins, and Bhumihar followed by Dalits, Ahirs, Nais, and Muslims. Other communities include Baniyas, Sonars, and Kumhars. Traditionally, people in the village do not marry within the same caste from the village, as they often belong to the same clan.

=== Housing and Living Conditions ===
Most residents of Reotipur live in pukka (permanent) houses, with only a few huts present in the village. The village is well-equipped with basic amenities, including access to clean water, electricity, and sanitation facilities.

=== Migration ===
Migration from Reotipur is common, primarily driven by the pursuit of employment opportunities and educational advancement. Many residents move to urban areas or other regions in search of better prospects.

== Administration ==
The Gram Panchayat administrates Reotipur village through Pradhan, who is an elected representative of the village. Reotipur is the largest part of Gram Panchayat of the Ghazipur district. The town was listed under Ambedkar Gram Yojna by the former Chief Minister of Uttar Pradesh, Mayawati and as a result, it is granted special privileges for its development program. Extensive construction and maintenance work had been undertaken with the revamping of old roads with concrete ones and many new routes.

Particulars	Total	Male	Female
Total No. of Houses	3457		
Population	26,597	14,105	12,492

== Transport and agriculture ==
Reotipur is well linked to other parts of the district through both public and private transport. The nearest railway stations are Dildarnagar, Bhadaura, and Ghazipur (13 km [8.1 mi]). The closest airport is Varanasi Airport, located 86.7 km (53.9 mi) west from the center of Reotipur. In terms of agriculture, Reotipur village is advantageously positioned because it is located on the banks of the Ganges river and a local river named Iqnaiya. The total area of the village is 4,576 acres (1,852 ha), out of which about 4,200 acres (1,700 ha) are crop-producing areas. All kinds of crops which grow in Uttar Pradesh and Buxar of Bihar are grown in the village. There are various kinds of modern machinery present in the village. The village has more than 80 tractors, 20 combine harvesters, and 8 balers for harvesting the crops. The village has solar tube wells for a more reliable electricity supply. The village has several shops. The water level of the village is not more than 100 ft.

== Bhagwati temple ==
After the defeat in the Battle of Khanwa and the Battle of Madarpur, there were three brothers named Maharaja Kam Dev Misir Sakarwār Mahārāja Dhāmdéva Singh Sakarwār, and Mahārāja Vikram Pratāp Dév Misir (Biram Dev) who were sons of Maharaja Jayarāja Déva Misir Sakarwār. Kāmdév who was a Brahmin while his ancestors went on to become Sakarwar Bhumihars and his brother Dhāmdév came to this region and the third brother (Vikram Pratāp) moved to another place. According to the history, Kāmdév Misir and Dhāmdéva Misir brought the statue of goddess Kāmākhyā from Vijayapur Sīkarī (where they ruled before), and installed it at the temple in Reotipur the construction of the present maa Bhagwatī temple was done by Jai karan rai( Lambardar) by asking for donations from the villagers . Raghunandan Brahma Baba temple is another major temple in Reotipur.

== Education ==
Reotipur has several educational organizations including government and private educational institutions. Reotipur has more than 15 private schools and more than 5 government schools. Government High School Reotipur is the only School which is owned by the State Government. This Government school is located in the combined campus of Kasturba Balika Vidyalaya and Composite Vidyalaya Reotipur. Nehru Vidya Pith is the most popular school while RNR international, BSD public school are top private schools. There is also a degree-granting college for higher education (graduate and post-graduate studies) named Gadadhar Shloka Mahavidyalaya and three Sanskrit Mahavidyalaya which also have a study center of Uttar Pradesh Rajarshi Tandon Open University (UPRTOU, Prayagraj). These affiliated colleges offer traditional undergraduate, postgraduate and Ph.D. degrees in different subject areas.

== Nearby places ==
- Ghazipur
- Varanasi
- Zamania
- Mohammadabad
- Sherpur, Ghazipur
- Gahmar
- Dildarnagar Kamsar

== See also ==
- Tilwa
- Basuka
- Gaura
- Suhwal
- Ramaval
- Mednipur
