= Basuka, Ghazipur =

Basuka बसुका
- village
- BASUKA
- Country: India
- State: Uttar Pradesh
- District: Ghazipur
- Established: 1542; 484 years ago
- Founder: Ratan Dev Rai

Government
  - Body: Gram panchayat

Area
  - Total: 678.14 ha (1,675.7 acres)

Population (2011)
  - Total: 8,534
  - Density: 1,258/km^{2} (3,259/sq mi)

Languages
  - Official: Hindi, Bhojpuri
- Time zone: UTC+5:30 (IST)
- Postal code: 232339
- Vehicle registration: UP 61
- Website: up.gov.in

Basuka is a village in Ghazipur District of Uttar Pradesh, India. The village is 28 km from Ghazipur district headquarter. The nearest railway station to the village is Bhadaura (3 km) and Karahia (3.5 km). The main occupations of people of the village is Agriculture. The main caste living there are Bhumihar, Brahman, Yadav, Muslims and other backward and schedule caste.

The main language spoken by people of the village is Bhojpuri as well as Hindi. Traditionally, most of the geographical land belonged to Bhumihar families, in which they themselves do agriculture practices or lend it to others.

== History ==
Basuka was founded by the descendants of Kam Deo sikarwar who migrated from Vijaypur Sikri in 1530.

Kam Dev's family was divided, with part of his family staying in Pahadgarh, while the other part relocated. Kam Dev had four sons. His eldest son's family moved to Kanpur district with him, while his second son, Vichal Misir, had part of his family remain in Pahadgarh, while the other part moved to Kanpur. The remaining two sons' families also joined Kam Dev in Kanpur by 1527. Dham Dev Rao and his brother Vikram Partap Dev also relocated their families to Kanpur district.

=== The Battle of Madarpur ===
After the three brothers settled in Kanpur with a large amount of gold coins and the statue of their clan deity, Mata Khamakhya, they became wealthy zamindars of the region. As they established their rule in Kanpur, Babur planned to attack their fort in Madarpur. This led to the Battle of Madarpur against Babur's general, Mir Baqi. Unfortunately, Kam Dev and his brothers, with their relatively small army, were defeated in 1528.

=== Migration to Ghazipur ===
On 26 October 1530, Kam Dev and Dham Dev migrated to Ghazipur, first settling at Sakardih near Kamakhya Devi temple, because of floods Kam Dev's family, migrated and settled in a place and kept its name Dalpatpur, now known as Reotipur.

In the family of Anchal Misir, Kam Dev's eldest son, had two sons name as Harish Chandra and Reosar. Reosar's descendants founded Nagsar. While Harishchandra had four sons, the eldest Rajmal Rao founded Tilwa, the second Sansar Rao founded Suhawal and Gaura, the third Gosai Rao founded Ramwal and adopted Islam, while the descendants of Puranmal Rao, the youngest (although some sources say he was the eldest and main heir after him) became the main owners of the estate, and established the large villages of Reotipur, Sherpur, and Basuka.

The younger son of Puramal named as Raja Ratan Dev Rai founded Basuka in 1542.

The eldest son of Puranmal named as Raja Narhar Khan adopted Islam in 1542 and moved to Usia and from him comes the most prominent branch known as "Kamsari Pathans" who founded Dildarnagar Kamsar.

== Demography ==
=== Religion and culture ===
The majority of people in village follow Hindu religion and the minorities are following Muslim religion.

The Family Goddess or Clan Deity of Bhumihar Families of the Village is Kamakhya Devi(Kamaichhaa Maiya). The temple is situated around 2.5 kms North-East of the village. This temple was first established by Kam Deo Misir and Dham Deo Misir who migrated from Fatehpur Sikri. The Bhumihars of this village are the descendants of Kam Deo Misir.

The village has multiple temples and a mosque. In the east side of the village, there is Budhwa Shiv Jee temple which is said to be older than 100 years and peoples of the village have great faith and belief, making it of great religious importance in the village. Another one is Mahavir ji mandir which is in Purab(East) side of the village and also has significant religious importance. One Kaali Mata temple is there at the far east side of the village.

Education Infrastructure The village has 3 schools, of which one is in the east of the village- Kanya Ucchatar Madhyamik Vidyalaya, one is in the west of the village- Prarthamik Vidyalaya(Primary School) and other is on the far west- Saraswati Shishu Mandir, that are runs under UP board. The village has 1 Madarsa as well.

== Courtesan ==
The village houses multiple tawayaf (female dancers, courtesans), who used to perform Mujra. But in the last few decades, this tradition has been on steep decline. Most of them settle on the Paschim Chhor(West Side) of the village. As per the latest news, these practices are almost ended because of the collective efforts of the respected villagers.
