= Dildarnagar (village) =

Dildarnagar Gaon Dildarnagar Deendarnagar
- Nabourhood
- Dildarnagar Gao
- Location in Uttar Pradesh, India
- Coordinates: 25.4282467°N 83.6685328°E
- Country: India
- State: Uttar Pradesh
- District: Ghazipur
- Established: 1698; 328 years ago
- Founder: Raja Deendar Khan

Government
  - Type: Sarpanch
  - Body: Gram Panchayat

Area
  - Total: 648.3 ha (1,602 acres)

Population (2011)
  - Total: 12,305
  - Density: 1,898/km^{2} (4,916/sq mi)
- Demonym(s): Dildarnagari & Kamsari

Languages
  - Official: Hindi, Bhojpuri
- Time zone: UTC+5:30 (IST)
- Postal code: 232326
- Vehicle registration: UP-61

Dildarnagar Gaon also known as Deendarnagar is a neighbourhood in Dildarnagar Town of Kamsaar in Ghazipur District, India. It is 4.5 km from Phooli and 11 km from Zamania. It was the capital of Dildarnagar estate.

== History ==
Dildarnagar was founded in 1698 AD by a Rajput Kunwar Naval Singh who adopted Islam and kept his name Raja Deendar khan. Deendar khan kept the name as Deendarnagar but because of mispronunciation during the British rule over India the name of the village Dildarnagar during 1860s. Kunwar Naval Singh use to live in the village named Samohta located in Bihar state of India. One day Mughal emperor Aurangzeb passed to the village and adopted the brother of Naval Singh and kept his name Danish khan. After that, the whole family shifted to Lahore in Pakistan and adopted Islam and then came to Ghazipur District and bought the village name as Akhanda in 592 coin used during Aurangzeb's empire in the year 1698AD and started living there. Later in 1874 the small village of Dildarnagar Fatehpur Bazar which was the market area of the town located 2 km away from Dildarnagar Gao became a town and Dildarnagar Junction railway station was built.
