= Nawali, Ghazipur =

Coordinates: 26°41′N 78°16′E

Nawali
- Village
- Location in Uttar Pradesh, India
- Country: India
- State: Uttar Pradesh
- District: Ghazipur
- Established: 1610; 416 years ago
- Founder: Nawal Rao

Government
  - Type: Panchayati Raj (India)
  - Body: Gram Pradhan

Area
  - Total: 1,596.57 ha (3,945.2 acres)
- Elevation: 70 m (230 ft)

Population (2011)
  - Total: 14,693
  - Density: 920.29/km^{2} (2,383.5/sq mi)

Languages
  - Official: Bhojpuri, Hindi, Urdu
- Time zone: UTC+5:30 (IST)
- Telephone code: 05497
- Vehicle registration: UP 61

Nawali is a village in Seorai tehsil of Ghazipur District, Uttar Pradesh, India.

== History ==
=== Mughal period ===
The land where Nawali village was established originally belonged to the family of Ratan Dev Rao, who was a son of Puranmal Rao and a great-grandson of Kam dev Misir. Puranmal Rao had seven sons of whom the eldest was Narhar Dev who adopted Islam, got the name Narhar Khan, and established Dildarnagar Kamsar. Puranmal's second son was Ratan Deo Rao who got the zamindar and established Basuka. Later, some of his descendants brought their relatives belonging to Sukulbansi Rajput clan and established Nawali, Trilokpur and Utarauli. The rest of Puranmal's sons lived at Reotipur and established many villages nearby. Ratan Dev Rao had three sons of whom the two eldest, Raj Shah and Bhoj Shah, established and lived in Basuka. His other son migrated and established Kaisikpur. One of the descendants of Raj Shah and Bhoj Shah had three daughters. The eldest of them married Nawal Rao and established Nawal. The second daughter married Utraul Rao and established Utrauli. The third daughter married Trilok Rao and established Trilok Puri. The Jama Masjid of Nawali was built by Nawab Sufi Bahadur in 1660. Nawab Sufi Bahadur Khan was a Nawab of Ghazipur.

=== British period ===
During the British period, many Kamsaar Pathans from Rakashan village migrated to Nawali, Ghazipur, and built their houses there. The original land extent of the village was 2,022.8 acres which was the ancestral land of the village while the ancestral or original land extent of Rakasha was 5,250 acres. This original land area consisted of the hamlets of Mahana, Gajarahi, Bagesari, Suryabanpur, Bhabhnauliya, Piajua, Rajpur, and Karma. After the migration of Kamsaries and other clans or groups in 1858, this area was extended more towards Rakasaha and Mahana village and was 3933 acres in the year 1909, later, it was 3,945 acres in 1952. The population of Nawali was 5,255 in the year 1865 but had fallen to 5,055 in the year 1881 later rising to 5,310 in 1891. As of 1901 census report, the population of Nawali was 4,824 of whom 787 were Muslims. Of the 787 Muslims, nearly 650 wear Pathans. The village mainly belonged to the Zamindar community and was kept on the revenue demand of 5,073 rupees in the year 1905. Chaudhari Basheer Ahmad Khan was the largest landowner and the Chaudhari of the village during later British era.

== Demographics ==
Nawali consists of two settlements, Nawali and Gajahari, with a total population of 14,693. The village of Gajahari has 225 houses and 1,580 residents. Nawali was originally populated by 13,113 people.

Historical population
Year	Pop.	±% p.a.
1853	4,171	—
1865	5,255	+1.94%
1872	5,228	−0.07%
1881	5,055	−0.37%
1891	5,310	+0.49%
1901	4,824	−0.96%
1911	5,300	+0.95%
1921	5,840	+0.97%
1931	6,400	+0.92%
1941	7,050	+0.97%
1951	7,098	+0.07%
1961	7,400	+0.42%
1971	8,200	+1.03%
1981	9,200	+1.16%
1991	10,285	+1.12%
2001	12,370	+1.86%
2011	14,693	+1.74%
