= Indian National Chemistry Olympiad =

Olympiad in Chemistry in India

The Indian National Chemistry Olympiad (INChO for short) is an Olympiad in Chemistry held in India.

The theory part of the INChO examination is held in end-January/beginning of February of every year. It is conducted by the Indian Association of Chemistry Teachers. School students (usually of standards 11 and 12) first need to qualify the National Standard Examination in Chemistry (NSEC) held in November of the preceding year. Among the 30,000+ students who sit for the NSEC, only the top 1% are selected for the INChO.

About 35 students are selected from the written examination. A total of 30 students are chosen from these to attend the Orientation-Cum-Selection-Camp (OCSC), chemistry, held at HBCSE, Mumbai.

Most students qualifying for the INChO are those completing their twelfth standard. However, in some cases, students have been selected for INChO at the end of the eleventh or tenth standard.

== OCSC Chemistry ==
The Orientation-Cum-Selection-Camp (OCSC), Chemistry, consists of rigorous training and testing in theory and experiment. The top four performers here are selected to represent India in the International Chemistry Olympiad. Before the INChO, the selected team undergoes rigorous training in theory and experiments in a Pre-Departure Training Camp held in HBCSE.

== See also ==
- National Standard Examination in Chemistry
- Junior Science Talent Search Examination
