= Medinipur, Ghazipur =

Mednipur Tari
- Village
- Location in Uttar Pradesh, India
- Country: India
- State: Uttar Pradesh
- District: Ghazipur
- Established: 1620; 406 years ago
- Founder: Zamindar Gosaimal Rai

Government
  - Type: Panchayati Raj (India)
  - Body: Gram Pradhan

Area
  - Total: 4,021.11 ha (9,936.4 acres)
- Elevation: 70 m (230 ft)

Population (2011)
  - Total: 7,763
  - Density: 193.1/km^{2} (500.0/sq mi)

Languages
  - Official: Bhojpuri, Hindi, Urdu
- Time zone: UTC+5:30 (IST)
- Telephone code: 05497
- Vehicle registration: UP 61

Mednipur is the largest village by area in Zamania tehsil of Ghazipur District, Uttar Pradesh, India. There are two more villages along, one Kalupr and second Tari or Tarighat. All three are separate panchayats.

== History ==
Tari or Mednipur before came in the zamindari of Gosai mal Rai a descendant of Maharaja Kam Dev Misir. Gosaimal adopted Islam in the 1540s. Gosaimal Rao got 20,000 bigha ancestral land or zamindari at a place where he established Ramaval village. He brought some people from his relatives and brothers and established the village Mednipur, Chaukiya, and Sonwal. Before Mednipur was part of Ramaval but was later population increased and a new village was made named as Mednipur or Tari. It derived its name because there was one Tari Ghat which was said to be built by Kam Dev and his descendants.

== See also ==
- Tilwa, Ghazipur
- Basuka, Ghazipur
