= GMR =

GMR may refer to:

== Transport ==
- Gahmar railway station, in Uttar Pradesh, India
- Gambir railway station, in Jakarta, Indonesia (station code GMR)
- Georgia Midland Railroad, in Georgia, United States
- Glenreagh Mountain Railway, in New South Wales, Australia
- Golden Myanmar Airlines, a Burmese airline
- Totegegie Airport, in French Polynesia

== Other uses ==
- GMR (cryptography), a digital signature algorithm
- GMR (magazine), a video game magazine
- The Great Movie Ride, a defunct dark ride formerly located at Disney's Hollywood Studios at the Walt Disney World Resort in Bay Lake, Florida.
- Genetics and Molecular Research, an academic journal
- BBC GMR, now BBC Radio Manchester
- Galápagos Marine Reserve, the protected waters around the Galápagos Islands
- General Motors Research Laboratories, a division of General Motors Corporation
- GEO-Mobile Radio Interface, a standard for satellite phones
- Giant magnetoresistance, a quantum mechanical magnetoresistance effect
- Giant monopole resonance, in physics, a form of giant resonance
- Glass Mountain Records, an American record label
- GMR Group, an Indian infrastructure company
- Golden-mantled rosella (Eastern rosella), an Australian parrot
- Great Man-Made River, an irrigation project in Libya
- Great Midwest Relay, now the Madison Chicago Relay, a 200-mile relay race
- Groupe mobile de réserve, paramilitary unit of Vichy France
- Genesis Magma Racing, racing team of Genesis Motor
