= NSEP =

NSEP may refer to:

- National Security Education Program
- National Standard Examination in Physics
- Norwegian EHR Research Centre
