= INBO =

INBO can refer to:

- Research Institute for Nature and Forest
- International Network of Basin Organizations
- Indian National Biology Olympiad
