= National Standard Examination in Junior Science =

School examination in India

The National Standard Examination in Junior Science or NSEJS is an examination in Science for secondary school students, usually conducted in the end of November. Organized by the Indian Association of Physics Teachers in association with Homi Bhabha Centre for Science Education (HBCSE), NSEJS is considered to be the toughest Science exam on higher secondary level globally. The NSEJS is carried out every year since 1987 in English, Hindi & a few other Indian languages. More than 80,000 students from over 1,500 centres take part in these olympiads.

== Eligibility ==
Only Indian citizens born between Jan 1, 2011 and 31st Dec, 2012 and are students studying in Class 8th, 9th and 10th can apply and appear for NSEJS 2026-2027. The student has to himself re-assure his eligibility. At any stage if the student is found to be not eligible for the exam, he/she may be disqualified from the program.

== Importance ==
The top 300 students or so, with state wise quota, from this examination are selected to sit for the Indian National Junior Science Olympiad. The examination, with both a theory and an objective paper is held in the last week of January. The top 35 or so students are then called for an Orientation cum Selection Camp (OCSC), and the top 6 among all students are selected for the International Junior Science Olympiad.

== Format ==
Before 2014-15, The NSEJS comprised both multiple choice questions and subjective questions. Due to the large volume of participating students, all questions were not checked for all candidates; subjective questions were checked for only those candidates scoring above a certain minimum in the multiple-choice questions. Multiple choice questions carried about 60% of the total weightage and were the crucial determinant for selection to the next stage.

The present format (from 2014-15 onwards) is composed entirely of 60 multiple-choice questions in physics, chemistry and biology.

== Fee ==
The fee for the NSEJS is Rs. 300 ($15 for overseas candidates). Application for this examination is typically handled through the school/college to which the student is affiliated.

== Qualifying for the Second Stage ==
The basic objective of conducting this test is not focusing on merit but to involve as many students from the country to participate in the exam and try to show and expose their talent. Hence the selection to the stage examinations i.e., International Junior Science Olympiad Examinations (IJSO) is based on the following scheme.

=== Cutoff ===
To be eligible to get to the next level, i.e., the second stage, it is necessary that a student scores at-least a Minimum Admissible Score (MAS) which is 50% of the average of the top ten scores rounded off to the nearest lower integer.

=== Proportional Representation Clause ===
The maximum number of students that can get to Stage II (InJSO) in each subject is around 300. These any students are not selected only on the merit basis but also on proportionate basis. This proportion is decided on the base of the number of candidates who appeared for NSEJS in the previous year from that center in each State or Union Territory (UT). In case there is a tie at the last position, then all the students competing for the last position will be eligible to move to stage II. However, it’s necessary that the selected students fulfill the eligibility clause laid out above. The total number to be selected from centers in each State for each subject will be displayed on the IAPT and HBCSE website.

=== Minimum Representation Clause ===
Notwithstanding the proportional representation clause, the number of students selected for IJSO from each State and UT must be at least one, provided that the eligibility clause is satisfied.

=== Merit Clause ===
As stated above, approximately 300 students are to be selected for second stage. If this does not happen according to MAS, then after selection as per merit, the shortfall from 300 students will be selected based purely on merit without further consideration to proportional representation and minimum representation clauses. In the event of a tie at the last position in the list all students with the same marks at this position will qualify to appear for the Stage II examination.

== See also ==
- International Junior Science Olympiad
