= NSEC =

NSEC may refer to:

- National Standard Examination in Chemistry
- Netaji Subhash Engineering College
- North Shore Events Centre
- The North Seas Energy Cooperation
- Next SECure record of the Domain Name System
