= NSEB =

NSEB may refer to:

- NS Electronics Bangkok
- National Security Education Board
- National Standard Examination in Biology
