= Dildarnagar =

Dildarnagar Deendarnagar Fatehpur
- Town
- Image of market road in the town of Dildarnagar in 2015
- Nickname: The Fun Town
- Location of Dildarnagar in Uttar Pradesh
- Country: India
- State: Uttar Pradesh
- District: Ghazipur
- Established: 16 July 1698
- Incorporated: 1 January 1879
- Founder: Raja Muhammad Deendar Khan

Government
  - Type: Chairman
  - Body: Nagar Palika Parishad

Area
  - Total: 19.9595 km^{2} (7.7064 sq mi)
  - Land: 19.628 km^{2} (7.578 sq mi)
  - Water: 0.3315 km^{2} (0.1280 sq mi)
- Elevation: 73 m (240 ft)

Population (2011)
  - Total: 29,242
  - Estimate (2021): 42,121
  - Density: 1,489.8/km^{2} (3,858.6/sq mi)
- Demonym(s): Dildarnagri, Kamsari

Languages
  - Official: Hindi, Urdu & Farsi, Arabic
- Time zone: UTC+5:30 (IST)
- PIN: 232326
- Telephone code: 05497
- Vehicle registration: UP-61
- Sex ratio: male 52% female 48% ♂/♀
- Website: https://dildarnagar.co.in/
- Market hub Of Dildarnagar Kamsar, Agricultural hub of Ghazipur

Dildarnagar is a Nagar panchayat in Kamsaar of Ghazipur District, Uttar Pradesh, India. Dildarnagar is a fast-developing town. It is located 34 km from Ghazipur. The sacred Shayar Mata Temple of Dildarnagar is very famous in whole India . The total area of Dildarnagar includes Fatehpur Bazar, Dildarnagar Gao, Tajpur, and Nirahukapura. These four neighbourhoods form the town of Dildarnagar. As of the 2011 census, the population of Dildarnagar was 28,913 and the town had an area of 1,995.95 hectares. Dildarnagar is on the road from Varanasi to Buxar. It was also the capital of Dildarnagar Estate. It comes under Zamania constituency. Avinash Jaiswal is currently serving as the Chairman of the Dildarnagar Nagarpanchayat.

== History ==
=== Ancient period ===
Between the town and the station lies a mound known as Akhandha, believed to have been the seat of the legendary Raja Naal. To the west stands a large tank named Rani Sagar, associated with his famed queen, Damayanti. The tank was reconstructed in 1710 by Raja Deendar Khan.

=== Medieval period ===
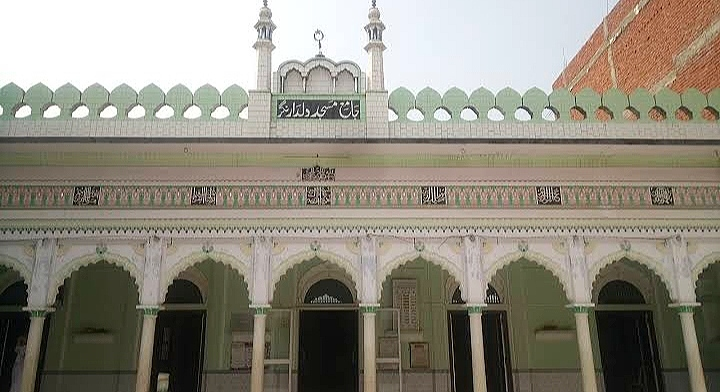
Jama Masjid build by Raja Deendar Khan in 1700

The land where the present town of Dildarnagar exists belonged to the Zamindars of Bahuara and Kusi, and was called village Akhanda. Dildarnagar was founded on 16 July 1698 by a Kunwar Naval Singh who adopted Islam and kept his name Raja Deendar Khan in 1674. Deendar Khan kept the name as Deendarnagar, but because of wrong pronunciation during the British rule over India, the name of was changed to Dildarnagar in 1839. Kunwar Naval Singh used to live in the village named Samohta located in Chainpur tehsil of Bihar, India. One day the Mughal emperor, Aurangzeb passed to the village and, being influenced by Naval Singh's brother, he adopted the aforementioned brother in 1674. He named his brother Miya Danish Khan. Aurangzeb also made Danish Khan the jagirdar of a place near Delhi in 1680s and gave him the title of Raja. After that, the whole family of Naval Singh shifted to Lahore and adopted Islam in 1660s. Kunwar Naval Singh was named Raja Muhammad Deendar Khan. Deedar Khan was a descendant of the family of Chainpur in Kaimur Bihar. Deendar Khan came to Ghazipur district and bought the village named Akhanda with 592 coins used during the Aurangzeb Empire in 1698 and started living there. He was made the Jagirdar of pargana Chainpur, Zamania and Chausa. Dildarnagar also saw a battle at Dildarnagar . Raja Deendar Khan Build an Eid Gah in the village between 1699 and 1705 CE and a Mosque called Shahi masjid. During Mughals empire, Zamania, Usia and Dewaitha were the main market centers of Dildarnagar Kamsar . But Dildarnagar was also a large market area during the 1700s.

Seorai, located near Dildarnagar of Ghazipur, witnessed a tragic historical event during the reign of Mughal Emperor Shah Alam I. On 16th Muharram (Tuesday, 1710-11 CE), Kunwar Dheer Singh (Muhammad Bahrmand Khan), the faujdar of Chainpur and the son of zamindar Muhammad Deendar Khan of Dildarnagar, was martyred while defending the region against a rebellious former faujdar of Chausa. The attack was orchestrated due to animosity from Moatsim Khan, the faujdar of Ghazipur.

The rebels looted villages like Seorai, Bareji, Gorasara, and Maniya, destroying property and desecrating Seorai's old mosque. Bahrmand Khan and his companions, including Sheikh Dayanatullah, Muhammad Hamza, and Muhammad Sultan, sacrificed their lives to protect the region.

The event deeply grieved Muhammad Dindar Khan, who documented the incident in a Persian "Mahzarnama" addressed to the emperor. Today, the Deendar Shamsi Museum and Library preserves this document, along with the legacy of Bahrmand Khan's bravery, as reflected in the five graves at Seorai's Kuttul Khan Mosque.

=== British period ===
Dildarnagar's original name was Akhandha, but in medieval period named changed to Deendarnagar, later regional pronunciations led in 1838 to a British officer writing the name as Dildarnagar. Dildarnagar was made a town in 1879, after Dildarnagar Junction Railway Station was built by the British Government in 1862. Fatehpur Bazaar was originally a market of Usia village but in the 1890s it was added to Dildarnagar. Yadav's has a very stronghold in Fatehpur Bazaar. Till 2007, Dildarnagar was used to be Vidhansabha Constituency but later is shifted to Zamania.

Shayar Mata Temple

Shayar Mata Temple is a local shrine situated between Platforms 3 and 4 of Dildarnagar Railway Station in Ghazipur district, Uttar Pradesh, India. The temple is associated with a popular local legend dating back to the British colonial period. According to local tradition, during the construction of the railway line, workers discovered a clay idol beneath a neem tree at the site. When attempts were made to cut the tree, several unexplained incidents reportedly occurred, which were interpreted by locals as divine intervention. It is believed that these events led railway authorities to alter the alignment of the track near the site. Over time, a temple was constructed there, and it has since become a place of local religious significance. Currently this temple is managed by descendants of Prem Singh Yadav

== Demographics ==
The town is home to about 28,913, among them 15,034 (52%) are male and 13,879 (48%) are female. 97% of the whole population are from general caste, 3% are from schedule caste and 0% are schedule tribes. The child (under 6 years old) population of Dildarnagar is 12%, among them 53% are boys and 47% are girls. There are 4,200 households in the city and an average of 7 people live in every family. Currently Baniya's has the highest population in Dildarnagar. In the 2001 census, the total population here were about 25 thousand. Female population growth rate of the city is 14.4% which is -0.8% lower than male population growth rate of 15.2%. General caste population has increased by 19%; Schedule caste population has decreased by -43.8% and child population has decreased by -14.8% in the city since the last census. Dildarnagar has 22% (6,426) population engaged in either main or marginal works. 34% of the male and 8% of the female population are working population. 24% of the total male population are main (full time) workers and 10% are marginal (part time) workers. For women, 6% of the total female population are main and 2% are marginal workers.

Historical population
Year	Pop.	±% p.a.
1853	1,900	—
1865	2,315	+1.66%
1872	2,542	+1.35%
1881	2,306	−1.08%
1891	2,797	+1.95%
1901	2,827	+0.11%
1911	2,968	+0.49%
1921	3,265	+0.96%
1931	3,428	+0.49%
1941	3,600	+0.49%
1951	4,320	+1.84%
1961	11,231	+10.03%
1971	16,987	+4.22%
1981	19,374	+1.32%
1991	21,310	+0.96%
2001	25,292	+1.73%
2011	28,913	+1.35%
2021 (estimate)	42,121	+3.83%

=== Religion ===
Religions in Dildarnagar
Religion	Percent
Hindus	60%
Muslims	38%
Christians	0.5%
Other religions or not stated	1.5%

Hindus contribute 60% of the total population and are the largest religious community in the city followed by Muslims which contribute 38% of the total population and not stated are the third largest religious community here with 1.5% population. Christians here are 0.5%. Female Sex ratio per 1,000 male in Hindus are 896 in Muslims are 940 and in Not stated are 1,250. As per the old Census during 1850–1870, very fewer Hindus lived in Dildarnagar and Kamsar. Other than Hindus there were also a small population of Sikhs who are believed to be settled here during 1700s. Later, in 1870s most of the Sikhs converted to Hindusium or Islam or left the place. Because of this, the Population of Sikh has declined in the region. As per the old census of 1820-1880s, it is observed that Dildarnagar and Kamsar was a Muslims majority place. But as of now, in this region most population is of Hindus.

== Agriculture ==
=== Agriculture ===
Green farms in Dildarnagar

Dildarnagar has a humid Subtropical climate with large variations between summer and winter temperatures. The average annual rainfall is 1,155 mm. Fog is common in the winters, while hot dry winds, called loo, blow in the summer. As of the 2011 census report, the geographical area of the town is 4,931.1 acres but the total crop producing area of the town is nearly 4,000 acres. All crops grow in Uttar Pradesh and Eastern Bihar are grown in the town. The soil of the town is rich in minerals and resources. The water level of the town is not more than 30 meters deep and towns have many ponds which cover more than 50 acres of land. The town of Dildarnagar is well connected to roads so it is easy to export crops and bring machinery to the town. Dildar nagar is also denoted as the agricultural hub of Ghazipur District. All the materials and machines like Tractors, Combine Harvesters, Balers etc., that are used in agricultural activities are easily available in the town as farming is done with modern machinery. Zamania Canal passes almost through the middle of the town and contributes in making irrigation easier.

=== Economy ===
Image of a road throw which Zamania Canal flows

Businesses like brick-making, fertilizer, pesticide manufacturing, cattle-rearing, poultry farming, and fish farming are done in the town. The town also has personally owned oil mills, flour mills, rice mills, dall mills, and sugar mills. The town has many shops, including one shopping mall and some mega markets. The economy of Dildarnagar is well maintained by trader/baniya community. Many fancy new Malls & Restaurants are opened too here. The town also has one railway station, eighteen English medium schools, two government schools, and three Degree Colleges. There are six banks in the town and more than ten ATMs. The town also has temples, a mosque, a gurudwara and an ashram. There were two playgrounds in the Dildarnagar as of 2011. The town of Dildarnagar also has one movie theatre which was established in 1962 by Nazir Hussain when he started Kamsar Films. Petrol pumps are easily available in and in close proximity of the town. Rest facilities are also available here. Dildarnagar is the main center of Dildarnagar Kamsar. The main market of Dildarnagar Kamsar, named Fatehpur Bazaar, is here. As of the census of 2011, Dildarnagar has an area of 883 acres and has a population of 4,293 households. On average, each house in Dildarnagar has an area of 8,960 sqft. The town also has a large fishery that spreads over 66 acres and is one of the main fisheries of the region.

== Infrastructure ==
Some houses near a pond in Dildarnagar

=== Education ===
There are more than fifty educational institutes in Dildarnagar, and many of them have been serving education for more than fifty years. The number of schools in Dildarnagar have increased a lot during 1950-1990s. During older days the number of schools were less because of which the people had to go to the city of Ghazipur for better education. After Dildarnagar Fatehpur Bazar and Dildarnagar Junction railway station was established, a large number of schools were built and the town grew up very quickly. There were also very few English medium schools during 1930s and 1940s. Some of the notable schools, colleges, and institutions in the town include Adarsh Vidyalaya Inter College, Crescent Convent School, New Shah Faiz Public School, Saraswati Sishu Mandir, St. Fransis Academy, Noble Senior Secondary School, St. Xavier's School, SKBM Degree College, Government Girls Inter College, Delhi Public School and Shahzada Industrial Training Institute. The town has three degree colleges . There is also an ashram located near the town which was established in the 1970s. There are also some government schools in the town. A technical institute and a medical college are under construction.

== Transport ==
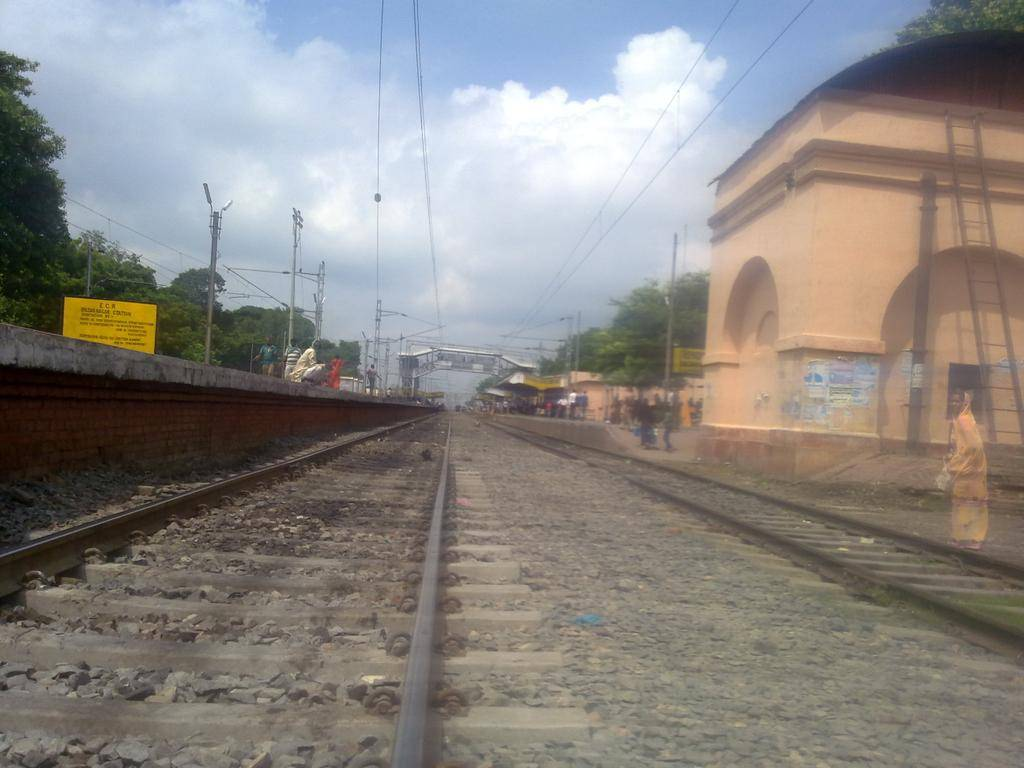
A view of Dildarnagar Junction Railway Station

Dildarnagar is located almost 34 km from the main city of Ghazipur. Dildarnagar is located on the road from Varansi to Buxar. The Dildarnagar Junction railway station is one of the busiest railway stations in Ghazipur, with almost 10,000 daily passengers. Dildarnagar Junction railway station was built in 1862, connected to the Mughalsarai line. It was connected to Tarighat in 1880.And it have 11 railway stations. The nearest international airport is Lal Bahadur Shahtri Airport, located in Varanasi. Other than international airports, Azamgarh Airport is the nearest national airport to Dildarnagar.

== Health ==
Image of MS Memorial Eye Hospital. As of 2015 it is the only eye hospital in Dildarnagar.

There are many hospitals and clinics located in Dildarnagar. The condition of Dildarnagar in terms of health is good. Some of the most notable hospitals located in the town of Dildarnagar are Bindeshwari Memorial Hospital, NN Tiwari Hospital, SBM Hospital, Government Hospital, Dr. Dilip Kumar Sharma Hospital, Madeeha Hospital, Life Care Hospital, Shahwat Hospital, Fatima Hospital, Asha Ashvi Hospital, Shivam Hospital, and MS Memorial Eye Hospital. Other than these hospitals, there are also many clinics in Dildarnagar.

=== Neighborhoods ===
Dildarnagar Gao, Fatehpur Bazar, Dildarnagar Gao Bazaar, Palia, Nirahukapura, Tajpur, Hussainabad, Ramnagar Dildarnagar, Shakuntala Nagar Dildarnagar, Railway Station Thana Road
