= IAPT =

IAPT is an initialism that can mean:

- International Association for Plant Taxonomy
- Indian Association of Physics Teachers
- Improving Access to Psychological Therapies - a United Kingdom government policy to improve access to psychological therapies
