= Delhi Directorate of Education =

School system in Delhi, India

Coordinates: 28.686409°N 77.223276°E

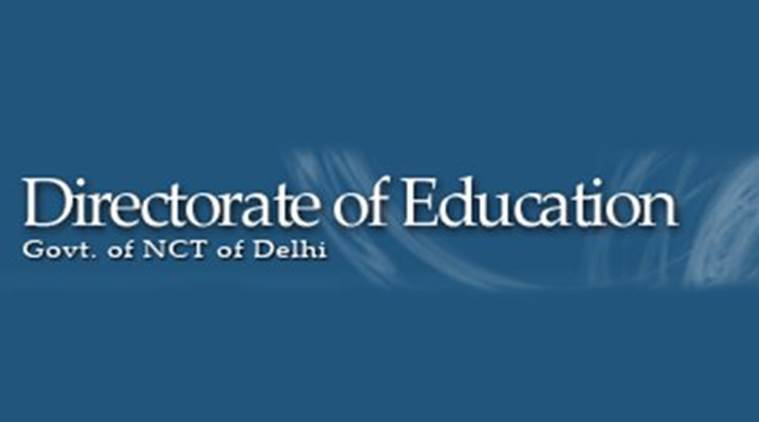

Location
- Old Secretariat, Delhi Delhi India

District information
- Type: Public
- Schools: 5691
- Budget: ₹11.22 billion

Students and staff
- Students: 16,65,000+
- Student–teacher ratio: 1:40 (Primary Level); 1:42(Middle Level); 1:48(Secondary and Senior Secondary Level)

Other information
- Director: Ms. Veditha Reddy, IAS
- Addl. Director: Na. Patil Pranjal Lehensingh IAS
- Secretary: SH. ASHOK KUMAR IAS
- Website: edudel.nic.in

Delhi Directorate of Education (DoE) is the department under the Government of Delhi responsible for managing the public school system in Delhi, India.

== History ==
In 1973, the Delhi School Education Act was passed by the Parliament of India, according to which responsibility for Pre-primary and primary level of education in Delhi was given to local bodies like MCD, NDMC and Delhi Cantonment Board; and Directorate of Education was made responsible for secondary and senior secondary level of education. In 1980–81, Delhi had 704 secondary/senior secondary schools, which increased to 1759 in 2007–08. Student enrolment also increased from 254,000 in 1980–81 to 793,000 in 2007–08. Because of the space constraint, the majority of Sarvodaya Vidyalayas were made to operate in two different shifts - a morning shift for girls and an evening shift for boys. Due to the high growth rate of the Delhi's population and shortage of infrastructure, Directorate of Education had also introduced primary classes in its 364 Sarvodaya Vidyalayas.

== Administrative structure ==
Directorate of Education divides Delhi region into 12 districts and 28 zones with hierarchy from district to zones. Each district consist one or more zones in it with District Education Officer as the head of education, similarly each zone has Zonal Education Officer to command the education department of zonal level.

== Demographics ==
In Delhi public schools the total school enrollment for boys is higher than females. In 2007-08 163,500 girls were enrolled accounting to 46.82% of total enrollment as compared to 185,700 enrollments of boys.

== Infrastructure Development ==
Delhi's public schools were historically not known for good infrastructure, for many years majority of the Delhi's school even didn't have proper school buildings which forced the students to attend the classes in open or in temporary tin-shades. But since last 15 years the conditions have changed and with the efforts of Directorate of Education, many schools have received well architecturally developed state-of-the-art buildings and other infrastructures. The DoE has engaged the Delhi State Industrial and Infrastructure Development Corporation (DSIIDC) and the Public Works Department (PWD) for this upgradation and refurbishment.

In 2021 Chief Minister Arvind Kejriwal approved the Delhi education department for the construction of the new rooms for the development of the school infrastructure. Deputy chief minister Manish Sisodia announced that there will be 12,478 new rooms which include 9,981 classrooms and 106 multipurpose rooms.

== Growth of education in public schools ==
The total pass percentage of Delhi's public schools students in the C.B.S.E. examinations is increasing per annual basis. The total students dropout rate from schools has been come down from 17.5% to 5.7%. The pass percentage growth rate of Delhi's secondary and senior schools is as follow:-

Year	Secondary School	Senior School
2005	48.00	76.44
2006	59.73	78.07
2007	77.12	82.73
2008	83.69	85.70
2009	89.44	87.14

== Teachers Union ==
Delhi Directorate of Education has a recognized elected Teachers Union body called Government Schools Teachers Association (GSTA) which represents the teachers serving under the Delhi Government. C. P. Singh is the current President and Ajay Veer Yadav is current serving General Secretary for the Union. Participating groups includes Adhyapak Shakti Manch

== Inclusive Education Branch ==
The Directorate of Education (DoE) is committed to provide Inclusive Education and need based educational supports to Children with Disabilities (CwDs) in its Govt. schools. Currently, there are about 12,000 CwDs studying in the Govt. schools of DoE from Pre-school to Class XII. The policy of Inclusive Education is being implemented in DoE in the line of the provisions under Right to Education Act 2009 and the Rights of Persons with Disabilities Act (RPWD), 2016. DoE has a well established Admin. Cell/Branch which caters to the needs of Children with Special Needs enrolled in the Government schools of Delhi, GNCTD. The Inclusive Education Branch is headed by deputy director of Education (IEB-HQ), Ms. Nandini Maharaj, IAS; who is further assisted by deputy director of Education (IEB), Dr. Sudhakar Gaikwad & Officer on Special Duty (OSD-IEB)/State Coordinator (Inclusive Education-Delhi) Dr. Ajay Kumar Singh. The Branch deals with all the Academic and Administrative work pertaining to Children with Special Needs and TGT/PGT-Special Education Teachers. The current address of the Branch is - Inclusive Education Branch (IEB), Directorate of Education GNCTD, Behind Lady Sri Ram College, Lajpat Nagar-IV, New Delhi-110024 and the Office is open for public dealing from 9:30 am to 6 pm five days a week.

== See also ==
- Education in Delhi
- List of educational institutions in Delhi
- Junior Science Talent Search Examination
