= Mathematical Olympiad Cell =

The Mathematical Olympiad Cell (MO Cell) is a body of permanent faculty devoted to organizing and conducting the mathematical Olympiads in India, in particular, the Indian National Mathematical Olympiad and the International Mathematical Olympiad Training Camp. The MO Cell has three main members:

- B.J. Venkatachala
- Prithwijit De
- N.V. Tejaswi (who replaced C.R. Pranesachar after he retired in April, 2013)

There are a number of other faculty who work part-time in conjunction with the MO Cell by sending problems for the Olympiads, participating in training activities, going as Leader/Deputy Leader, and participating in regional co-ordination.

The members of the MO Cell used to operate solely from the Indian Institute of Science, Bangalore, based on an agreement, and Prof. Venkatachala still does so. The two new members, Dr. De and Dr. Tejaswi, function from the HBCSE, where the IMO Training Camp was held until 3 years ago, and from where co-ordination for the outgoing team is managed.

== See also ==
- Indian National Mathematical Olympiad
- International Mathematical Olympiad Training Camp
- International Mathematical Olympiad
