= Inao =

Inao may refer to:

== Places ==
- Iñao National Park and Integrated Management Natural Area, a protected area in the Chuquisaca Department Bolivia
- Inao Station, a railway station in Ōmachi, Nagano Prefecture, Japan
- Inao (epic), a story from Thai literature adapted from the Panji tales
- Kazuhisa Inao (1937–2007), a Japanese professional baseball pitcher
- Christ Inao Oulaï (born 2006), Ivorian footballer
- Indian National Astronomy Olympiad, the national stage for selecting the Indian team for the International Olympiad on Astronomy and Astrophysics.

INAO may refer to:

- Institut National des Appellations d'Origine, a French organization charged with regulating French agricultural products
