= Jayashree Ramadas =

Indian academic (born 1954)

- Born: 1954 (age 71–72); Mumbai, India
- Education: Fergusson College, IIT Kanpur, Pune University
- Title: Professor (H), Centre Director
- Scientific career
- Fields: Science Education
- Workplaces: HBCSE, TIFR Centre for Interdisciplinary Studies

Jayashree Ramadas (née Taskar) is an Indian educationist. She was the Centre Director (2011–2016) of Homi Bhabha Centre for Science Education (HBCSE), a National Centre of the Tata Institute of Fundamental Research (TIFR) in Mumbai, India. In her capacity as a professor she teaches graduate courses related to cognition and science education. She is also a member of the International Union of Pure and Applied Physics and International Committee on Physics Education. Ramadas was appointed Dean, HBCSE, in November, 2008, and in June 2011, was appointed the Centre Director. She is currently Professor at the TIFR Centre for Interdisciplinary Studies, Hyderabad.

== Early life ==
Jayashree Ramadas (Taskar) was born in Bombay (now Mumbai) in 1954. Her father was a telecommunication engineer. Her early schooling was in St. Thomas' School, Delhi, following which she studied for a year at American School, Baghdad, and completed her schooling from St. Helena's School, Pune. She studied in Fergusson College, Pune, and obtained her master's degree in Physics from IIT Kanpur in 1976.. She went on to do her doctoral studies in Science Education at HBCSE. Her PhD devree was awarded by Pune University. Hers was possibly the first thesis on Science Education in India.

== Career ==
For most of her career, Ramadas has been at HBCSE. She did a postdoctoral stint at the University of Leeds and was subsequently inducted as a member of the faculty at HBCSE. She became a full Professor in August 2007 and Dean in November 2008. In June 2011 she took over from H. C. Pradhan as the fourth Centre Director of HBCSE, being appointed for a period of five years. She also spent a year each at Tufts University and MIT.

In January 2017, Ramadas moved to the TIFR Centre for Interdisciplinary Studies, Hyderabad.

== Award/scholarship ==
- 1971–1981 National Science Talent Search Scholarship
- 2011 TWAS Regional Office Prize for "Development of Scientific Educational Material"
