= Meghar Singh Sakarwar =

Indian Independence Activist

Meghar Singh Sakarwar or Meghar Singh (c. 1820-1860) was a zamindar from Gahmar village in Ghazipur district of present day Uttar Pradesh, India. He participated in the rebellion of 1857 against East India Company supporting the rebel soldiers under Babu Amar Singh.

== Role in the 1857 rebellion ==
On 6 June 1858, Amar Singh and his troops of 2000 sepoys and 500 sowars arrived in the village of Gahmar in Ghazipur which is situated near the border with Bihar. The SakarwarRajput rebels from this particular region under the leadership of Meghar Singh, wanted assistance from Amar Singh and a letter for alliance was sent from the village requesting his help. Amar Singh accepted this letter of request. In return, Meghar Singh personally rewarded Babu Amar Singh with a nazrana or gift worth Rs 20,000. They exchanged supplies including arms aid and Amar Singh left from Gahmar village on 10 June 1858. One of the reasons for this alliance were the old marital ties shared between the Sakarwar Rajputs and the Ujjainiya Rajputs. Throughout the rest of the summer of 1858, the rebels kept on adding to its size by including more deserters from army sepoys. They kept the British troops engaged in six parganas of Ghazipur and neighbouring regions along the Ganges and Karamnasa rivers.

== Death ==
By the end of December 1858, rebel forces had faced disintegration under continuous military action against them by British troops. Meghar Singh along with his followers escaped to Nepal but the local rulers didn't gave them refuge. In late 1860, he was arrested and after a trial in court at Benares district was executed.
