= Dildarnagar Fatehpur Bazar =

Dildarnagar Fatehpur Bazar Fatehpur, Deendarnagar
- Town
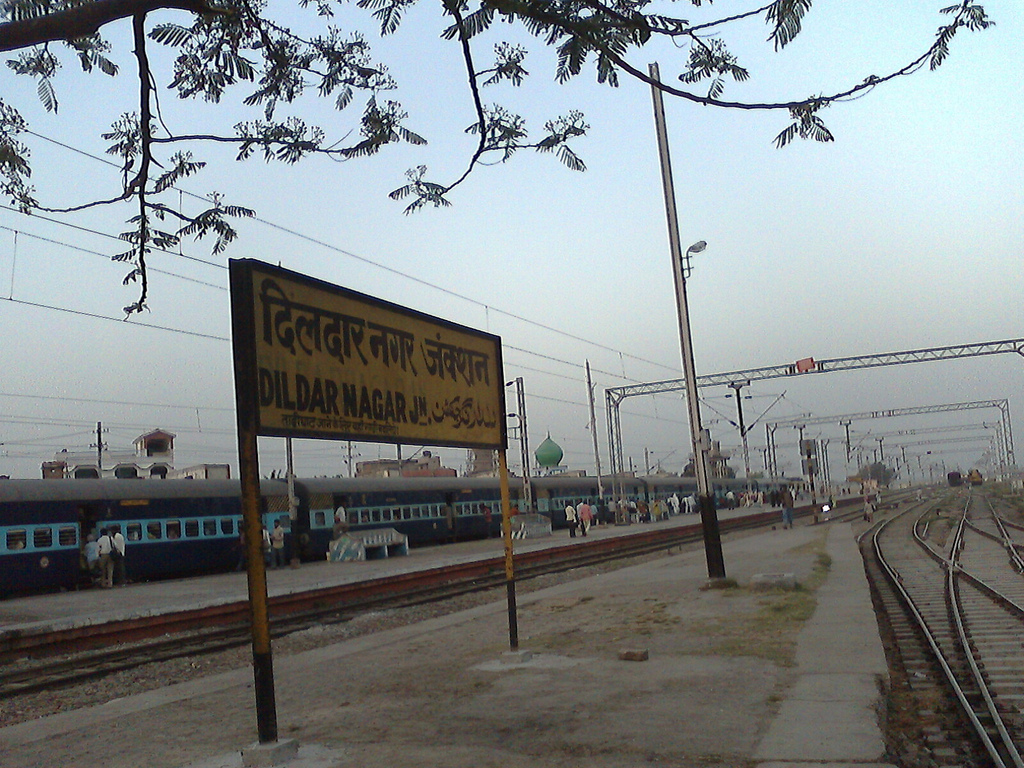
- Dildarnagar
- Nickname: kamsar
- Location of Dildarnagar in Uttar Pradesh
- Coordinates: 25.4178°N 83.6736°E
- Country: India
- State: Uttar Pradesh
- District: Ghazipur
- Established: 1874(Dildarnagar Fatehpur)
- Founder: Zamindars of Usia

Area
  - Total: 1,000 ha (2,500 acres)
- Elevation: 73 m (240 ft)

Population (2011)
  - Total: 12,855
  - Density: 1,300/km^{2} (3,300/sq mi)

Languages
  - Official: Hindi, Urdu and Bhojpuri
- Time zone: UTC+5:30 (IST)
- PIN: 232326
- Telephone code: 05497
- Vehicle registration: UP-61
- Sex ratio: male 52% female 48% ♂/♀

Dildarnagar Fatehpur Bazar is a neighbourhood of Dildarnagar, located in the Ghazipur district of the Indian state of Uttar Pradesh. It is situated on the banks of the River Ganges and is approximately 35 kilometers from the city of Ghazipur. The town is known for its historical and cultural significance, and it has several temples, mosques, and other landmarks that attract visitors from different parts of India. Dildarnagar is also an important commercial center and has a bustling market where locals and visitors can purchase a variety of goods and products. As of 2011 estimate the Population of Dildarnagar is 12855 and have an area of 1000 hectares.

== History ==
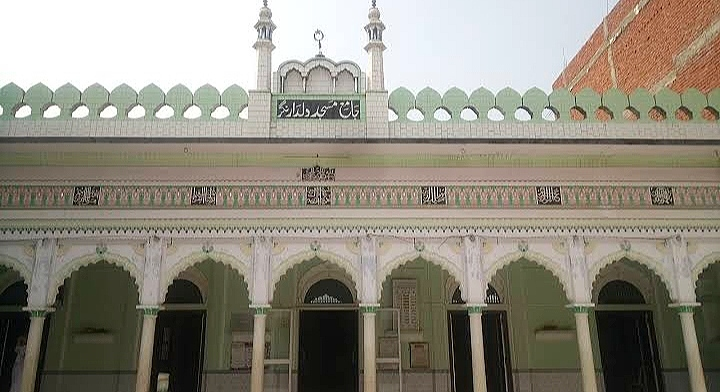
Jama Masjid build by Raja Deendar Khan in year 1700

Dildarnagar is on the road from Varanasi to Buxar and 27 km from Ghazipur. Between the town and the station there is mound called Akhandha, said to have been the seat of Raja Nal; the large tank to the west is called Rani Sagar after his famous queen Damayanti. Dildarnagar was founded in 1698 AD by a Rajput Kunwar Naval Singh who adopted Islam and kept his name Raja Deendar khan. Deendar khan kept the name as Deendarnagar but because of wrong pronunciation during the British rule over India the name of the village Dildarnagar during 1839 AD. Kunwar Naval Singh use to live in the village named Samohta located in Bihar state of India. One day Mughal emperor Aurangzeb passed to the village and adopted the brother of Naval Singh and kept his name Danish khan. After that whole family shifted to Lahore in Pakistan and adopted Islam and then came to Gazipur district and bought the village name as Akhanda in 592 coin used during Aurangzeb Empire in the year 1698 AD and started living there. Dildarnagar was made a town in year 1874AD when after Dildarnagar Junction railway station was built by the British government. Raja Deendaar Khan Build a Eid Gah in the village between 1700 and 1705 CE. The Fatehpur bazar was established in year 1874 by the zamindars of Usia.

== Agriculture and infrastructure ==
Dildarnagar has a humid subtropical climate with large variations between summer and winter temperatures. The average annual rainfall is 1155 mm (44 in). Fog is common in the winters, while hot dry winds, called loo, blow in the summer. The geographical area of the neighborhood is 1000 hectares. Business like Brick making, fertilizer and pesticides making, cattle-rearing, poultry farming, fish rearing is done in the town. The town also have personally owned oil mills, flower mills, rice mills, Dall mills and sugar mills.

=== Historical population ===
Historical population
Year	Pop.	±%
1861	425	—
1871	480	+12.9%
1881	560	+16.7%
1891	600	+7.1%
1901	650	+8.3%
1911	680	+4.6%
1921	710	+4.4%
1931	740	+4.2%
1941	890	+20.3%
1951	1,010	+13.5%
1961	5,800	+474.3%
1971	8,200	+41.4%
1981	9,440	+15.1%
1991	10,442	+10.6%
2001	11,153	+6.8%
2011	12,855	+15.3%
Source: Census of India

== Notable schools and colleges ==
- Crescent Convent School
