= Ajay Veer Yadav =

General Secretary of Government Schools Teachers Association
- Incumbent
- Assumed office 2014

Personal details
- Born: 20 September 1970 (age 56) Baghpat, Uttar Pradesh
- Education: Sant Gadge Baba Amravati University
- Occupation: General Secretary of Government Schools Teachers Association
- Website: Official website

Ajay Veer Yadav (born 20 September 1970) is the General Secretary of Government Schools Teachers Association of India. Currently representing the teachers serving under the Government of Delhi and Delhi Directorate of Education he has been active in teacher politics since 1995.

== Early life ==
Ajay Veer Yadav was born on 20 September 1970 in an Ahir family to Kanwar Singh and Kanta Devi. He completed his higher education from Delhi.

== Teachers Union politics ==
After assuming the office as the General Secretary of Government Schools Teachers Association in 2014 the association led a campaign for the removal of pay anomalies. Delegation of the Association met Dr. Jitendra Singh, Union Minister of State for PMO. Ajay Veer Yadav met with Rajnath Singh and Najeeb Jung, former Lt. Governor of Delhi regarding these demands.
