= Pahargarh =

- Village
- Pahargarh
- Location of Pahargarh in Madhya Pradesh
- Coordinates: 26.1966152°N 77.6442932°E
- Country: India
- State: Madhya Pradesh
- District: Morena
- Established: 1447; 579 years ago
- Founder: Rao Anup Dev Sikarwar

Government
  - Type: Gram panchayat
  - Body: Gram pradhan

Area
  - Total: 652 ha (1,610 acres)
- Elevation: 72 m (236 ft)

Population (2011)
  - Total: 5,591

Languages
  - Official: Hindi/Urdu
- Time zone: UTC+5:30 (IST)
- Vehicle registration: UP 61
- Climate: BW (Köppen)

Pahargarh is a village located in Morena district of Madhya Pradesh, India. It was formerly the headquarters of Pahargarh Estate. The village is the site of the historic Pahargarh Fort.

== Caves ==
A series of 86 caves can be seen at a distance of about 12 miles from Pahadgarh . These caves are considered to be contemporary of Bhimbetka caves of Bhopal. In the beginning of civilization, people used to take shelter in these caves. Many pictures related to men, women, birds, animals, hunting and dance can be seen in the caves. These pictures show that even in prehistoric times, human art was alive in the Chambal valley.
