= National Board for Higher Mathematics =

Government board

National Board of Higher Mathematics

Agency overview
- Formed: 1983
- Type: Board
- Parent department: Department of Atomic Energy
- Parent agency: Government of India
- Website: www.nbhm.dae.gov.in

The National Board for Higher Mathematics (NBHM), founded in 1983 by the Indian Government, is a board in India intended to foster the development of higher mathematics, help in the establishment and development of mathematics centres, and give financial assistance to research projects and to doctoral and post-doctoral scholars. It is funded by the Department of Atomic Energy and is an autonomous body. NBHM functions autonomously preparing its budget based on the funds made available by Dept. of Atomic Energy.

== Programs ==
The NBHM gives direct financial support to the following (among others):

- The Mathematical Olympiads in India: NBHM finances the MO Cell and also arranges money for the IMO Training Camp and India's participation in the International Mathematical Olympiad.
- Undergraduate and masters' scholarships.
- Research Scholarship

For M.A. (Master of Arts) and M.Sc. (Master of Science) in Mathematics, NBHM conducts the Nationwide test.

== The Institution ==
One of the most popular movements in the spreading Higher Mathematics in India taken up by NBHM is its funding to various university and institute libraries across India for books and journals in mathematics. NBHM manages its whole Library Movement through its National Library Committee. The business of the committee is divided into five major zones of India, viz. North, East, West, South and North Central zones. Besides extending the financial support to host of libraries in India, NBHM has recognized 12 libraries across India as the Regional Libraries. The Regional Libraries are expected to cater to the needs of the mathematicians and allied scientists in terms of library services. People from every walk of life can become a member of the Regional Libraries if they are doing research in mathematics of allied topics or if they are studying higher mathematics.

== Nurture Program ==
National Board for Higher Mathematics in India, conducts a program (called Nurture Program) for 20 students of class XII, from the senior batch of the IMOTC who have shown a special interest in mathematics. Any of these students formally pursuing mathematics at the undergraduate level (B.A./B. Sc or an integrated M.A./M.S. course) is entitled to a scholarship of Rs. 2500/- (Rs. Two Thousand Five Hundred only) per month from NBHM. Selected students may participate in the nurture program even if they choose not to pursue a formal program in mathematics at the undergraduate level.

The nurture program is of four-year duration. Each batch of students is assigned to a faculty of active research mathematicians. The faculty devises a syllabus for the students for each academic year and also guides them with proper references. The faculty also keeps in touch with the students through post. At the end of a year the students are called for a contact program with the faculty for three to four weeks. During this period the faculty arranges lectures on diverse topics and clears specific difficulties of the students. In addition, they are given tests to assess their progress. Based on the performance of the student the faculty decides on whether the student should or should not continue in the program. In case of the students who are not pursuing a formal undergraduate program in mathematics the faculty also recommends whether the student can be offered an annual scholarship of Rs.15,000/-(Rs. fifteen thousand only) in the next year. After the completion of four years in the program the students are awarded certificates. It is envisaged that the mathematical scholarship of these students will be on par with or superior to that of most M.Sc. (Mathematics) degree holders in the country.
