= National Standard Examination in Astronomy =

Indian exam

IAPT LOGO	
Conducted By	Indian Association of Physics Teachers
First Conducted	1987
Website	iapt.org

The National Standard Examination in Astronomy or NSEA is an examination in astronomy and astrophysics for higher secondary school students, usually conducted in the end of November (last or second last Saturday). Organized by the Indian Association of Physics Teachers in association with Homi Bhabha Centre for Science Education (HBCSE), NSEA is the first stage of selection of students in the IOAA. The NSEA is carried out every year since 1987 in English, Hindi & a few other Indian languages. About 16000 students from over 1,200 centres take part in these olympiads.

== Eligibility ==
Indian citizens who are in classes 10th, 11th, 12th at the time of examination are eligible to write the exam.

== Format ==
The paper consists of 48 single correct type and 12 multiple correct type questions. It has a time limit of 2 hours. There are questions from high school level physics, mathematics and some questions from general astronomy.

== Question Paper ==
The medium of test is English and Hindi only and comprises 48 objective single correct type questions and 12 objective multiple correct type questions. They have marking scheme of 3,0,-1. and 6,0,0 respectively.(as of 2025)

== Qualifying for the Second Stage ==
The basic objective of conducting this test is not focusing on merit but to involve as many students from the country to participate in the exam and try to show and expose their talent. Hence the selection to the stage II examinations i.e. Indian National Olympiad Examinations (INOs) is based on the following scheme. Students are divided into two pools; A, with those in class 12, and B, with those in class 11 or below.

=== Cutoff ===
To be eligible to get to the next level, i.e. the second stage, it is necessary that a student scores at-least a Minimum Admissible Score (MAS) which is 50% of the average marks scored by top 10 candidates of their group.

=== Proportional Representation Clause ===
The maximum number of students that can get to Stage II (INO) in each subject is around 300. These many students are not selected only on merit basis but also on proportionate basis. This proportion is decided on the basis of the number of candidates who appeared for NSE in the previous year from that center in each State or Union Territory (UT). In case there is a tie at the last position, then all the students competing for the last position will be eligible to move to stage II. However it's necessary that the selected students fulfill the eligibility clause laid out above. The total number to be selected from centers in each State for each subject will be displayed on the IAPT and HBCSE website.

=== Minimum Representation Clause ===
Not withstanding the proportional representation clause the number of students selected for INO from each State and UT must be at least one, provided that the eligibility clause is satisfied.

=== Merit Clause ===
As stated above, approximately 300 students are to be selected for second stage. If this does not happen according to MAS, then after selection as per merit, the shortfall from 300 students will be selected based purely on merit without further consideration to proportional representation and minimum representation clauses. In the event of a tie at the last position in the list all students with the same marks at this position will qualify to appear for the Stage II examination.

== Fee ==
The fee for the NSEA is about Rs. 300 ($5 for overseas candidates). Application for this examination is typically handled through the school/college to which the student is affiliated

== Indian National Astronomy Olympiad ==
Held in first week of February, this is a subjective exam lasting for 3 hours. Top 15 students from group A and top 35 students from group B are selected for the third stage.

== OCSC Astronomy ==
The students are taught and tested on data analysis, theory and observation. From their performance in the tests, a team of five students is selected to represent India in IOAA.

== See also ==
- Indian National Astronomy Olympiad
- International Astronomy Olympiad
- India at the IAO
