= Phooli =

- Village
- Phuli t Chaudhari Azmal
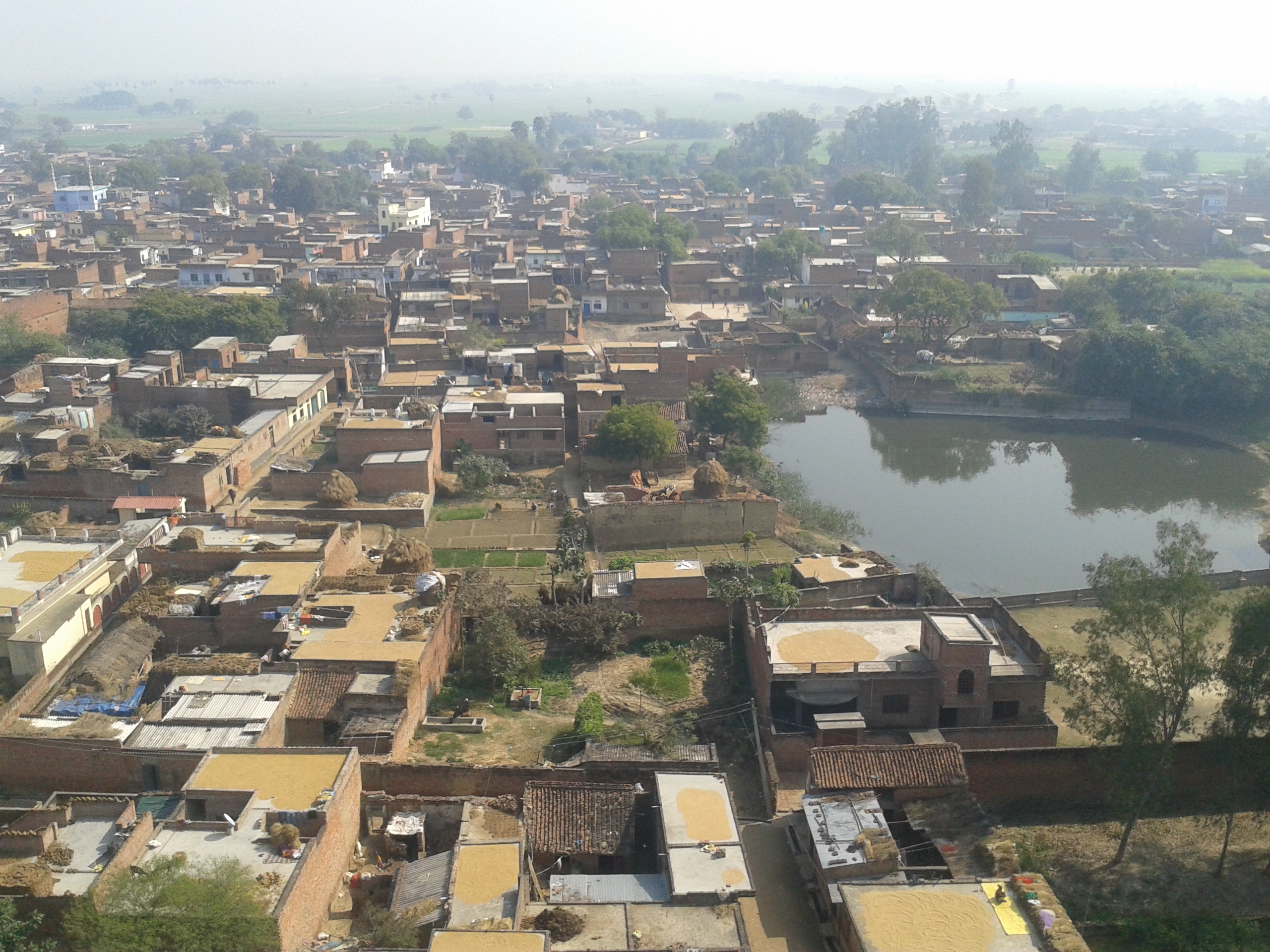

- Location in Uttar Pradesh, India
- Coordinates: 25.429734°N 83.619161°E
- Country: India
- State: Uttar Pradesh
- District: Ghazipur
- Established: 1640

Government
  - Type: Panchayat
  - Body: Gram Pradhan (Dr. Shyam Narayan Singh Kushwaha)

Area
  - Total: 668.03 ha (1,650.7 acres)
- Elevation: 58 m (190 ft)

Languages
  - Official: Bhojpuri
- Time zone: UTC+05:30 (IST)
- PIN: 232329
- Telephone code: 05497
- Vehicle registration: up-61
- Sex ratio: male 57% female 43% ♂/♀
- Distance from New Delhi: 870 kilometres (540 mi) NW (land)
- Distance from Mumbai: 1,576 kilometres (979 mi) SW (land)
- Distance from Chennai: 1,903 kilometres (1,182 mi) SE (land)
- Distance from Kolkata: 718 kilometres (446 mi) (land)
- Climate: Cfa (Köppen)
- Precipitation: 980 millimetres (39 in)
- Avg. annual temperature: 32.0 °C (89.6 °F)
- Avg. summer temperature: 33.0 °C (91.4 °F)
- Avg. winter temperature: 33 °C (91 °F)

Phooli village is located between Dildarnagar and Zamania in Ghazipur district in the Indian state of Uttar Pradesh. The village is close to the Ganges river.

Phooli is a very old village, it is one of the oldest in Ghazipur district.

The people of the village are primarily Hindu and Muslim. The common languages used are Hindi and Bhojpuri, with Bhojpuri being the day-to-day language.

Phooli has a bus station on the main road route between Zamania and Bara. Phooli provides the main primary facilities, including a market, schools, a hospital and transport. The main market is Haulia chowk, where road transport can be hired. The village has 2,500 ration cards.

Government and private schools include the Sri M.A.D.A.P.V. school and the Shree Aditya Lal Janata Yoges High school.

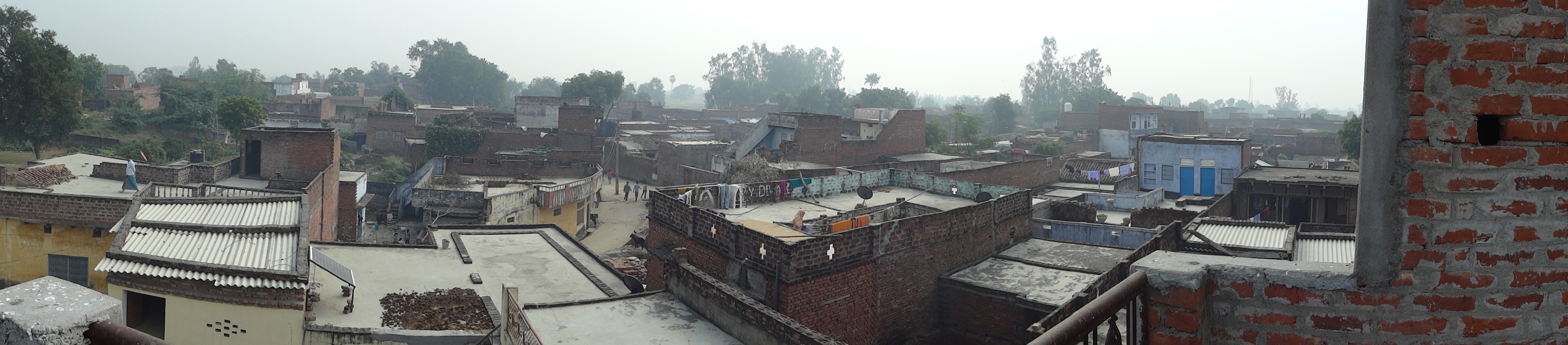
A view of the locality
