= Indian National Mathematical Olympiad =

Annual high school mathematics competition held in India

The Indian National Mathematical Olympiad (INMO) is a highly selective high school mathematics competition held annually in India. It is conducted by the Homi Bhabha Centre for Science Education (HBCSE) under the aegis of the National Board for Higher Mathematics (NBHM).

The Mathematical Olympiad Program (MOP) comprises a five-stage process overseen by the National Board for Higher Mathematics (NBHM). The initial stage, the Indian Olympiad Qualifier in Mathematics (IOQM), is organized by the Mathematics Teachers’ Association (MTA). Subsequent stages are conducted by the Homi Bhabha Centre for Science Education (HBCSE).

== Eligibility and participant selection process ==
In order to be eligible to take the INMO, a participant must be either an Indian citizen or an Overseas Citizen of India. Only Indian citizens may join the Indian IMO team. In addition, all participants, regardless, must meet qualification indices determined by previous rounds.

== Structure & Pattern of the IOQM ==
The Indian Olympiad Qualifier in Mathematics is a thirty-question integer-type examination of 3 hours duration. It is usually held on the first Sunday of September. It is equivalent of the AIME conducted in the United States. Top 10% performers of IOQM are awarded merit certificates every year.

== Structure & Pattern of the INMO ==
It is a six-question proof-based examination of 4.5 hours duration. It is usually held on the third Sunday of January. It is similar to the USAMO conducted in the United States. Top 48 (Classes 8 to 11) performers of INMO are felicitated as INMO Awardees every year.

Eligibility via Regional Mathematical Olympiad (RMO) The RMO is a proof-based examination consisting of six problems to be solved in three hours and is generally held in October or November. Students who qualify through the Indian Olympiad Qualifier in Mathematics (IOQM) are eligible to appear for the Regional Mathematical Olympiad (RMO). Qualification is determined separately for each region, with approximately 200 students from Classes 8–11 qualifying from each region irrespective of the region's population or number of participants. Consequently, qualifying scores vary substantially between regions. The RMO is a proof-based examination consisting of six problems to be solved in three hours and is generally held in October or November. Advancement from the RMO to the Indian National Mathematical Olympiad (INMO) is also determined on a regional basis, with approximately 30 students from each region qualifying for the INMO each year. As a result, cutoff scores for both the IOQM–RMO and RMO–INMO stages differ considerably across regions. Consequently, regional cutoff scores vary substantially; for example, in the 2024 RMO to INMO selection process, Category A cutoffs ranged from 1/102 in Sikkim to 51/102 in Delhi.

== Further training ==
=== International Mathematical Olympiad Training Camp (IMOTC) ===
INMO Awardees attend a four-week IMOTC in May. First-timers start in early May, while returning participants join a week later. Four selection tests and two practice tests are held, and the top six qualify for the IMO team.

=== International Mathematical Olympiad (IMO) ===
The selected six-member team attends a two-week Pre-departure Camp (PDC) before the IMO in July. Accompanied by a leader, deputy leader, and observer, the team represents India. Ministry of Education funds travel, and NBHM covers other expenses.

== Premier undergrad programs for INMO Awardees ==
- Exempted from IIT-JEE, via exclusive tests and/or interviews, for admission to:
  - BTech in Computer Science and Engineering at IIT Madras, IIT Kanpur and IIT Kharagpur.
  - BS in Mathematics at IIT Bombay.
- Exempted from admission test for ISI Kolkata, CMI Chennai, IIIT Hyderabad and IIIT Bangalore.

== India at the International Mathematical Olympiad ==
1. Team India had its best performance (World #4) at the IMO in 2024.
2. Pranjal Srivastava is the most decorated Indian (World #19) at the IMO Hall of Fame.

== See also ==
- American Mathematics Competitions
- American Invitational Mathematics Examination
- United States of America Mathematical Olympiad
- International Mathematical Olympiad
