= Arvind Kumar (academic) =

Indian physicist (born 1943)

- Born: 15 October 1943 (age 83)
- Known for: Science Education
- Awards: Padma Shri; TWAS regional award for Science Education
- Scientific career
- Fields: Physics, Education
- Workplaces: Bombay University, Homi Bhabha Centre for Science Education

Arvind Kumar (born 15 October 1943) is an Indian physicist and educationist. He was Centre Director, Homi Bhabha Centre for Science Education, Mumbai, during the period 1994-2008. For his contributions in the field of science education, he was awarded the Padma Shri, India's fourth highest civilian honour, in 2010. He is a Fellow of the National Academy of Sciences, India, and is the recipient of several other honours and awards, including the TWAS regional award for Science Education.

== Early life ==
Arvind Kumar was born on 15 October 1943. He did his doctoral work in theoretical physics at the Tata Institute of Fundamental Research, Mumbai, and completed his dissertation in 1969.

== Career ==
After his Ph.D., Kumar did postdoctoral stints at CERN, Geneva, and the University of London. Subsequently he returned to India and taught in the Department of Physics of Bombay University for about twelve years. During this period he was an active worker and research guide in theoretical high energy physics.

Kumar joined the Homi Bhabha Centre for Science Education (HBCSE) as Professor in 1984. In 1994, after the retirement of V. G. Kulkarni, the founder-Director of HBCSE, Kumar was appointed Centre Director, and held the position until his superannuation in 2008. After his retirement he held the post of Raja Ramanna Fellow at HBCSE until October 2013. Subsequently he was associated with the Centre for Excellence in Basic Sciences, Mumbai, as visiting faculty, and is currently a member of its Academic Board. He continues his association with HBCSE as visiting scientist.

Kumar has been active in the Olympiad movement in the sciences. During his tenure as Director, HBCSE became the national nodal centre for the Physics, Chemistry, Biology, Astronomy and Mathematics Olympiads. Kumar was also responsible for the launch of a new programme called the National Initiative for Undergraduate Science.

Kumar was closely involved in the process of evolving the National Curriculum Framework (NCF 2005) as a member of the Steering Committee and as the Chair of the National Focus Group on the Teaching of Science.

When The World Academy of Sciences (TWAS) instituted regional Awards for Science Education in 2008, Kumar was among the first recipients. In 2010, he was honoured with the Padma Shri.

== Books written by Arvind Kumar ==
- Chaos, Fractals and Self-Organization, published by National Book Trust, published 2011; ISBN 978-81-237-1596-4.

== Awards and honours ==
- Fellow, National Academy of Sciences, India (elected 2007)
- The World Academy of Sciences Regional Prize for Science Education, 2008
- Padma Shri 2010
