= Pahargarh Estate =

15th-century Zamindari estate

Pahargarh estate
- 1446–1947
- Capital: Pahargarh
- Religion: Hinduism
- Maharaja, Raja
- Historical era: Middle Ages
  - Established: 1446
  - Disestablished: 1947
Succeeded by
Republic of India
- Today part of: Shivpuri, Morena, Gwalior, Jhansi

A view of Pahargarh Fort built by Rao Anup Dev Singh Sikarwar in 1446.

Pahargarh Estate was ruled by Sikarwar Rajput Kings, Jhansi State and British Raj. Pahargarh is located in Madhya Pradesh, in Morena District, India.

Pahargarh was ruled by Maharaja Sikarwar royal family of Pahargarh who were the descendants of Rao Anup Dev Sikarwar his grandson Kam Dev Rao when Kam Dev shifted to Ghazipur District in 1530, the estate was handled by his second, third, and fourth sons' family. Half of their family went with Kam Dev in Ghazipur District in Uttar Pradesh and half lived in Pahargarh Estate. The first ruler of Pahargarh Estate was Rao Anup Dev Singh Misir, who was originally a ruler of Viajypur Sikri (Fatehpur Sikri), but later captured parts of Morena, Gwalior and Jhansi and established Pahargarh and built Pahargarh Fort. Pahargarh came under the rajputana .
