= Suhwal =

- Village
- Nickname: Baraka Gaon
- Location in Uttar Pradesh, India Suhwal (India)
- Coordinates: 25.926111°N 83.362778°E
- Country: India
- State: Uttar Pradesh
- District: Ghazipur

Population (2011)
  - Total: 10,814

Languages
  - Official: Hindi
- Time zone: UTC+5:30 (IST)
- PIN: 232332
- Telephone code: 05497
- Vehicle registration: UP-61
- Distance from New Delhi: 865 kilometres (537 mi) NW (land)
- Distance from Mumbai: 1,570 kilometres (980 mi) SW (land)
- Distance from Chennai: 1,894 kilometres (1,177 mi) SE (land)
- Distance from Kolkata: 711 kilometres (442 mi) (land)
- Climate: Cfa (Köppen)
- Precipitation: 980 millimetres (39 in)
- Avg. annual temperature: 32.0 °C (89.6 °F)
- Avg. summer temperature: 33.0 °C (91.4 °F)
- Avg. winter temperature: 33 °C (91 °F)

Suhwal is a village of Ghazipur district under Reotipur block. It is situated on Ghazipur to Buxar Road 8 km (5 mi) from Ghazipur City. Its population is 10,814 (2011 Census). The Village is quite old. It has its own local administration under the Panchayati Raj system, with Gram Pradhan as head of local administration. There are two Government Secondary Schools, three Government Primary Schools and some privately run Schools. There is a small permanent Market in the western side of the Village and also a weekly Market. Suhwal is a center of Shopping and Primary Education for many other small villages situated on its fringe.

== History ==
The village's name is believed to be from a Loriki folk tale involving Lord Shiva. The Suhval village was established by great grandson of Maharaja Kam Dev misir name as Raja Sansar Misir or Sansar Rai. the old market of the village was established by Nawab Fazl Ali Khan, who was a Nawab of Ghazipur.

== Schools and temples ==
Temples, such as Mandas baba shrine and shiva temple at shivala xing, are famous. The village has three schools, one is government inter college located on the outskirts of the village on the highway connecting Ghazipur city to Zamaniya, there is also a school specially meant for girls education namely sant mandas baba balika vidyalaya founded under jagardev rai smriti sansthan, a locally based society registered under societies act India, another coed school is run by the Hindu activist group RSS in the village. One more school is Suhawal inter college which is run by zilla parishad ghazipur (up).This school was started in year 1949.and Founder principal of this school is Sri Sudama Rai MA(HINDI) MA(ENGLISH)LT. Suhwal Mahadeva which exist on the eastern side of the village has old Lord Shiva temple. The village has two local banks Gramin Bank and a Co-operative Bank.

== Transport ==
The village is at a distance of nearly 12 km from Ghazipur City Railway station and UP Roadways Ghazipur depot, other near by railway stations is Dildarnagar and Zamania Railway station, A very old train halt namely Tarighat is also at a distance of around 3 km from the village, but only one local train to Dildarnagar and Zamania run from this halt, the village can be reached through road transport by mean of private vehicles or rented vehicles, such as auto rickshaws, or mini buses.

== Administration ==
Suhawal comes under Reotipur block, and Jangipur Vidhansabha of Ghazipur Lok Sabha constituency, although the Tehsil under which it is administered is Zamaniya, the village has a police station around 1 km far from the village center. Under Panchayati Raj system, Gram Pradhan is head of local administration. Ganga Ram Pandey was first Gram Pradhan who served the village from 1952 to 1962. Patkhaulia village which was earlier the part of Suhawal Gram-Panchayat, has been separated and has been made an independent new Gram-Panchayat, named as " Patkhaulia Gram-Panchayat" since 2015.

== Agriculture ==
Agriculture is the main source of income and living for the residents, nearly all type of food grains which are cultivated in eastern UP are also produced here, popular crops include wheat, paddy and potatoes, though other crops such as mustard, lentils, bajra are also produced in large quantities, the village has privately owned rice mills and cold stores. Farmers often sell their products either in the local market or in the anaj mandi(government food grains store house) located in jangipur, farming is done with semi modern and semi classical techniques, tractors electrical water pumping sets are used for farming but bigger machines like harvesters are still out of fashion in the village.

== Language and Culture ==
Bhojpuri and Hindi are spoken by the majority of people in the village, though Urdu has also a great influence. Culturally the area is much influenced by Varanasi, a major cultural center nearby. A large annual fair, organized per the Hindu calendar in November–December to celebrate Lord Ram's wedding with Mata Sita, is the most important cultural event.

== Nearby places ==
- Ghazipur
- Reotipur, Uttar Pradesh
- Dildarnagar
- Zamania
- Varanasi
- Mughalsarai
- Patna
- PG College Ghazipur
