= Indian National Physics Olympiad =

Indian student physics competition

The Indian National Physics Olympiad (INPhO in short) is the second stage of the five-stage Olympiad programme for Physics in India. It ultimately leads to the selection in the International Physics Olympiad.

INPhO is conducted on the last Sunday of January, every year, by the Homi Bhabha Centre for Science Education. School students (usually of standards 11 and 12 albeit special cases prevail) first need to qualify the National Standard Examination in Physics (NSEP) held on the last (or second last) Sunday of November of the preceding year. Among over 40,000 students appearing for the examination at almost 1400 centres across India, around 300 to 400 students are selected for INPhO based on their scores and also based on regional quotas for the states from which they appear. Different state-wise cut-offs exist for selection to INPhO. INPhO serves as a means to select students for OCSC (Orientation Cum Selection Camp) in Physics, as well as to represent India in the Asian Physics Olympiad (APhO).

National Standard Examination in Physics
| Conducted By | Indian Association of Physics Teachers (IAPT) |
| IAPT LOGO | |
| First Conducted | 1987 |
| Website | iapt.org.in |

== Eligibility ==
=== NSEP ===
The National Standard Examination in Physics (NSEP) is a national exam for students in grades 10-12. It's used to shortlist students for INPHO. Students must be under 20 years old by June 30 of the IPHO year and cannot have passed Class 12. Past participants in IPHO or APHO are eligible for INPHO directly.

The exam has 60 multiple-choice questions (48 single-correct and 12 multi-correct), with a 2-hour time limit. It's held on the last Sunday of November, and the top 400 students (200 each, group A & group B) advance to the Indian National Physics Olympiad (INPHO). The syllabus aligns broadly with up to CBSE Standard 12 Physics.

== Syllabus and Format ==
=== INPHO ===
It's organized at two levels Group A (Class 12) and Group B (Class 10 & 11). INPHO consists of, usually, about 6 subjective problems, which the students must solve in 3 hours. Use of a non-programmable scientific calculator is usually allowed, as long as it has less than 4 lines in its display, no graphing feature and no CAS-like functionality. The total marks vary each year. Earlier, the syllabus matched that of IPHO, but now, it is broadly equivalent to the syllabus of NSEP. It was changed for the convenience of students studying for the IIT-JEE and the IPHO, at the same time.

=== APhO Training Camp ===
The selected team of 8 students, for APhO, must attend a 5 day long training camp prior to APhO, where topics such as relativity and thermodynamics, absent/not stressed upon in most Indian schools, are covered. The team also undergoes training in experiments. The syllabus is equivalent to the syllabus of IPhO (Same as that of APhO).

=== OCSC Physics ===
The top 40 students (20 each, Group A & Group B), based solely on their INPhO scores are selected to attend the Orientation cum Selection camp (OCSC), a 14-day long camp held at HBCSE, Mumbai. However, in 2014–15, HBCSE being busy in the organisation of IPhO 2015, India, OCSC was organised by IAPT, and held in New Delhi.Dates are usually from the end of May to the start of June. The team for the International Physics Olympiad is selected based on a rigorous procedure of theory and practical examinations (Normally, 3 each) at OCSC Physics.60% (240 marks) weightage is given to the theory exam, and 40% (160 marks) to the practical one, akin to that at the International Physics Olympiad. The difficulty level is similar to that found in the international olympiad. Topics such as relativity and thermodynamics, absent/not stressed upon in most Indian schools are covered. The syllabus is equivalent to that of IPhO.

=== PDC Physics ===
A PDC (Pre-Departure training camp for physics) is held to (rigorously) train the five-student team, for 10–14 days, prior to IPhO, in experiment and theory.

== Awards and incentives ==
Qualification for OCSC assures students of direct entry into the B.Sc. (Honors) Math and Physics program at the CMI. Besides that,

- Special UG admission and exemption from IIT-JEE at IIT Gandhinagar for IMOTC, IOITC, OCSC (Physics/Chemistry).
- Special UG admission for select courses at IIIT Hyderabad.

== See also ==
- International Physics Olympiad
- Asian Physics Olympiad
- Indian Association of Physics Teachers
- Homi Bhabha Centre For Science Education
- International Science Olympiad
- Junior Science Talent Search Examination
