= Gahmar =

Village in Uttar Pradesh, India

- Village
- Location in Uttar Pradesh, India Gahmar (India) Gahmar (Asia)
- Coordinates: 25.497°N 83.822°E
- Country: India
- State: Uttar Pradesh
- District: Ghazipur
- Established: 1530; 496 years ago
- Founder: Raja Dham Dev Rao

Government
  - Type: Sarpanch (Pradhan)
  - Body: Gram panchayat

Area
  - Total: 1,766 ha (4,360 acres)

Population (2011)
  - Total: 25,994
  - Density: 1,472/km^{2} (3,812/sq mi)

Language
  - Official: Hindi
  - Additional official: Urdu
- Time zone: UTC+5:30 (IST)
- PIN: 232327
- Telephone code: 05497
- Vehicle registration: UP, 61
- Nearest city: Zamania
- Sex ratio: 1000/913 ♂/♀
- Lok Sabha constituency: Ghazipur
- Vidhan Sabha constituency: Zamania
- Civic agency: Gahmar
- Climate: Normal (Köppen)

Gahmar is a village in India, located near the Ganges river in the Ghazipur district in the state of Uttar Pradesh. The village is 38 km from Ghazipur. The village has two post offices, and one panchayat bhawan. Gahmar is also known as the "Army Village". The Gahmar village is also recognised as the most populated or among the most populated villages in India.

== History ==
Gahmar was settled by Sikarwar Rajputs, the descendants of Dham Dev Rao (also known as Dham Deo Misir) who came from the vicinity of Fatehpur Sikri after Babur captured it in 1527 AD. They are closely related to the Sakarwar Bhumihars and Kamsar Pathans, the descendants of Dham Deo's brother Kam Deo Misir. After moving east from Fatehpur Sikri, initially, both of them settled in Sakradih, but due to floods, Dham Deo migrated to Maa Kamakhya Dham near Gahmar and Kam Deo settled in Reotipur. Dham Dev had two sons—Roop Ram Rao and Diwan Ram Rao. One of Roop Ram's son, Sainu Mal Rao and his descendants settled largely in Gahmar. By 1800 AD, 23 patties in Gahmar were established by the clan members.

== Demographics ==
As of 2011 Indian Census, Gahmar had a total population of 25,994, of which 13,367 were males and 12,627 were females. Population within the age group of 0 to 6 years was 3,650. The total number of literates in Gahmar was 17,108, which constituted 65.8% of the population with male literacy of 74.0% and female literacy of 57.1%. The effective literacy rate of 7+ population of Gahmar was 76.6%, of which male literacy rate was 86.4% and female literacy rate was 66.2%. The Scheduled Castes and Scheduled Tribes population was 3,295 and 327 respectively. Gahmar had 4365 households in 2011. The main population of Gahmar lived in an area of 476 acres.

== Transport ==
=== Railways ===
Gahmar railway station is connected to Patna and Pandit Deen Dayal Upadhyaya Junction railway station.

=== Roadways ===
Gahmar is situated on NH-124C which is connected to district headquarters Ghazipur, about 35 Km.

== Places of interest ==
- Maa Kamakhya Temple, Gahmar
- Manbhadra Mahadev Temple, one of oldest temples of Shiva
- Narayan Ghat

== Notable people ==
- Meghar Singh Sakarwar
