= Nirahukapura, Dildarnagar =

Nirahukapura
- Nabourhood
- Nirahukapura, Dildarnagar
- Location of Nirahukapura in Uttar Pradesh
- Country: India
- State: Uttar Pradesh
- District: Ghazipur
- Established: 1880; 146 years ago

Government
  - Type: Sarpanch
  - Body: Gram Panchayat
- Elevation: 72 m (236 ft)

Population (2011)
  - Total: 3,753

Languages
  - Official: Hindi/Urdu
- Time zone: UTC+5:30 (IST)
- PIN: 232326 to** (** area code)
- Vehicle registration: UP 61
- Climate: BW (Köppen)

Nirahukapura is a nebourhood in of Dildarnagar in Kamsaar of Ghazipur District, Uttar Pradesh, India. It is iDildarnagar Fatehpur bazar Nagar Panchayat. The main village of Nirahukapura is to the side of the Dildarnagar town.

The total geographical area of village is 347.65 hectares. Nirahukapura has a total population of 3,753 peoples. There are about 557 houses in Nirahukapura village. Zamania is the nearest town to Nirahukapura.
