= Kam Dev Rao =

Ruler in north India (1438–1532)

- Rao
- Reign: 1462-1527 (the Rao of Pahargarh Estate); 1527-1530 (Raja of Fatehabad); 1530-1532 (ruler of Birpur estate)
- Predecessor: Maharaja Jayraj Dev
- Successor: Raja Dham Dev
- Born: 1438 CE; Vijaypur Sikri, India
- Died: 1532 (aged 94 ) Reotipur, Ghazipur, India
- Spouse: two wives
- Issue: Achal Misir (b.1456); Vichal Misir (b.1458); Sarang Misir (b.1461); Rohit Misir (b.1465); (Children from second wife is not known)
Names
- Maharaja Kam Dev
- House: Sikarwar Clan
- Father: Maharaja Jayraj Dev
- Religion: Hinduism

Kam Dev Rao (1438–1532) ruled over the region of Fatehpur Sikri and then Fatuhabad near Fatehpur.

He was a ruler of Pahargarh Estate, which mainly comprised what are now the cities of Morena, Gwalior, Jhansi, and Shivpuri. Maharaja Kam Dev was the son of Maharaja Jayraj Dev Singh who was the ruler of the Vijaypur Sikri kingdom. (Fatehpur Sikri). Dham Dev was an ally of Rana Sanga. Kam Dev's descendants went on to populate the areas around Ghazipur while his brother Dham Dev Rao's descendants stayed in Morena.

== Biography ==
=== Early life ===
Kam Dev Rao was born in 1438 CE at Vijaypur Sikri. His father, Maharaja Jayraj Dev Singh was the ruler of the Vijaypur Sikri kingdom. Kam Dev had two younger brothers: Dham Dev Rao (also known as Rao Dham Dev) and Vikram Pratap Dev Singh. His father allocated parts of the Pahargarh estate to him. Kam Dev's coronation took place in 1462. He also served as the army chief of his father's military. The kingdom of Vijayapur Sikri was handed over to Maharaja Jayraj Dev. when Kamdev became old, Dhamdev Rao managed the affairs of Vijaypur Sikri.

A view of Pahargarh Fort built by Rao Anup Dev Singh, Great grand father of Kam Dev Rao Anno 1446.

After the death of Maharaja Jayraj Dev Singh (1420–1504) in 1504, Kam Dev's brother Dham Dev Rao (1458–1540) was crowned as the king of Vijaypur Sikri. Vijaypur Sikri was a large kingdom consisting of Fatehpur Sikri (parts of Agra), Karauli, Dholpur, Etawah, Auraiya, parts of Kanpur, Unnao and Chitrakoot, Fatehpur, Morena, Bhind and Sheopur. While Dhamdev ruled Vijaypur Sikri, Kam Dev governed the Pahargarh Estate. The youngest brother, Vikram Pratap Dev, was responsible for handling the affairs of both brothers' territories. After their father's death, Kam Dev became the army chief of Dham Dev's army, during the times of Kam Dev and Dham Dev Rao they commissioned rebuilding of Shergarh Fort located at Dholpur. The Sabalgarh fort once served as the centre of administration during the rule of Sikarwar Rajput.

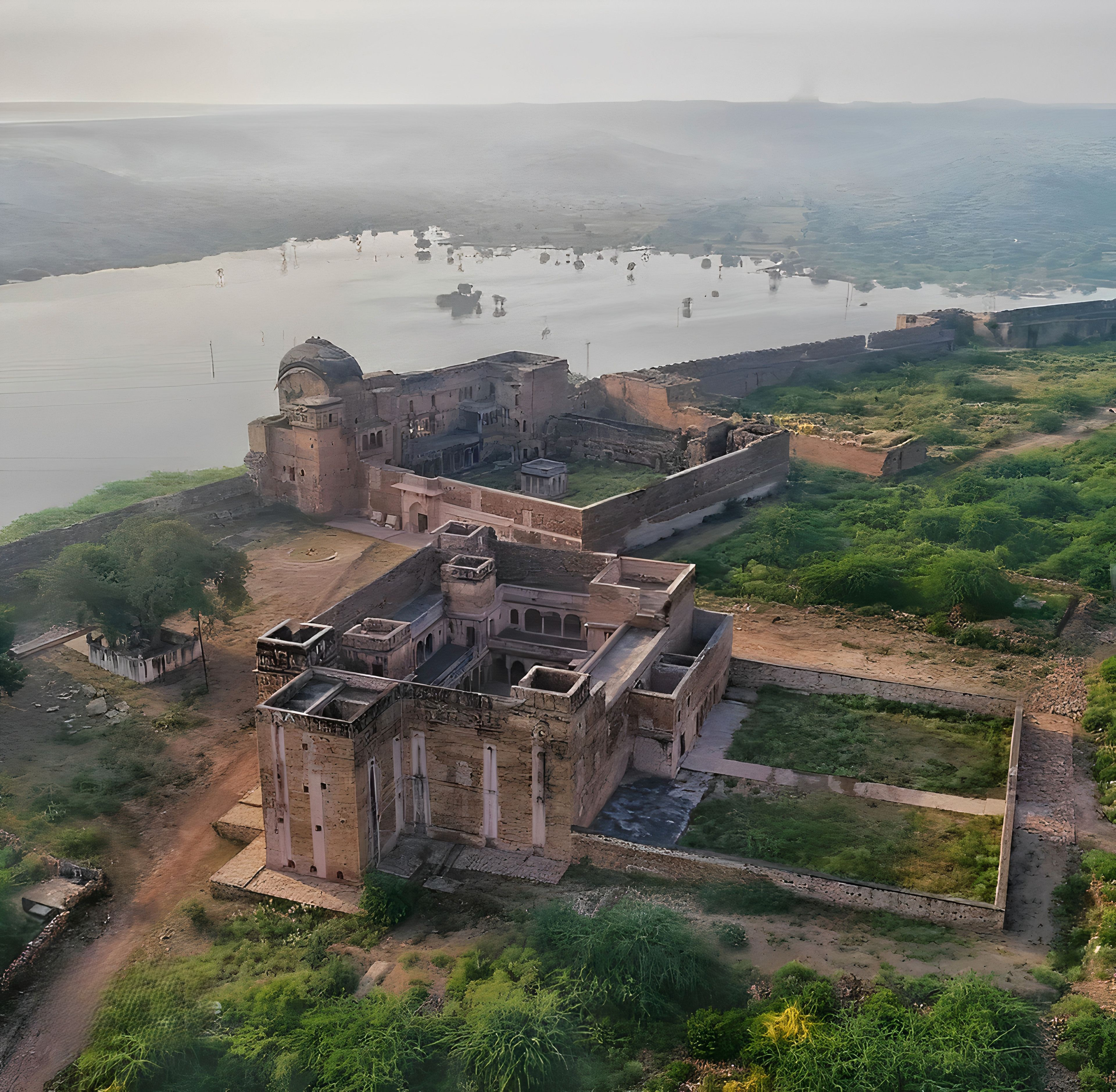
A view of Sabalgarh Fort which was under the administration of Sikarwar Rajput, it was built by a gurjar ruler named 'Sabal', although most of its present structure was built by a Raja Gopal Singh of Karauli State, when it was taken over by Marathas from Sikarwar's.

Following the Battle of Khanwa, Kam Dev lost his kingdom but retained control over Kanpur, Kannauj, and Fatehpur. Kam Dev and his brother Dham Dev established their new capital at Madarpur. However, after their defeat in the Battle of Madarpur, they moved to Ghazipur. In Ghazipur, they established their control on Birpur, which was previously ruled by the Chero dynasty and Dikhit Rajputs. After a battle in 1530, Kam Dev overthrew the ruler of Birpur and became the ruler of the Birpur estate.

=== The Battle of Madarpur ===
After the three brothers settled in Kanpur with a large amount of gold coins and the statue of their clan deity, Mata Khamakhya, they became wealthy zamindars of the region. As they established their rule in Kanpur, Babur planned to attack their fort in Madarpur. This led to the Battle of Madarpur against Babur's general, Mir Baqi. Unfortunately, Kam Dev and his brothers, with their relatively small army, were defeated in 1528.

=== Migration to Ghazipur ===
On 26 October 1530, Kam Dev and Dham Dev migrated to Ghazipur, first settling at Sakardih, because of floods Kam Dev's family, migrated and settled in a place and kept its name Dalpatpur, now known as Reotipur.

In the family of Anchal Misir, Kam Dev's eldest son, had two sons name as Harish Chandra and Reosar. Reosar's descendants founded Nagsar. While Harishchandra had four sons, the eldest Rajmal Rao founded Tilwa, the second Sansar Rao founded Suhawal and Gaura, the third Gosai Rao founded Ramwal and adopted Islam, while the descendants of Puranmal Rao, the youngest (although some sources say he was the eldest and main heir after him) became the main owners of the estate, and established the large villages of Reotipur, Sherpur, and Basuka. The eldest son of Puranmal named as Raja Narhar Khan adopted Islam in 1542 and from him comes the most prominent branch known as "Kamsari Pathans" who founded Dildarnagar Kamsar.
