= Tajpur, Dildarnagar =

Tajpur
- kamsar
- Interactive map of Tajpur
- Coordinates: 25.428634°N 83.657151°E
- Country: India
- State: Uttar Pradesh
- District: Ghazipur

Government
  - Body: Gram panchayat

Languages
  - Official: Hindi
- Time zone: UTC+5:30 (IST)

tajpur (officially known as Tajpur, Dildarnagar)' is neighbourhood in Dildarnagar of Dildarnagar Kamsar in Ghazipur district of Uttar Pradesh, India.
