= Nagsar, Ghazipur =

Coordinates: 21°18′N 74°10′E

Nagsar Nagsar Nawaju Rai, Nagsar Mir Rai
- village
- Interactive map of Nagsar
- Country: India
- State: Uttar Pradesh
- District: Ghazipur
- Established: 1532; 494 years ago
- Founder: Reosar Rai

Government
  - Body: Gram panchayat

Area
  - Total: 941.43 ha (2,326.3 acres)

Population (2011)
  - Total: 00
  - Density: 0.0/km^{2} (0.0/sq mi)

Languages
  - Official: Hindi
- Time zone: UTC+5:30 (IST)
- Vehicle registration: UP

Nagsar is a village in Ghazipur District of Uttar Pradesh, India. Nagsar Village is divided into two patti or two villages named as Nagsar Newaju Rai and Nagsar Mir Rai. Nagsar Halt is the nearest railway station serving this village. These two patti are named after Nawaju Rai and Mir Rai who were the descendants of Reosar Rai. Reosar Rai was the Grand son of Maharaja Kam Dev Misir.
