= Norwegian EHR Research Centre =

The Norwegian EHR Research Centre (Norwegian: Norsk Senter for Elektronisk Pasientjournal, NSEP) is the Norwegian research centre for electronic patient records at NTNU (Norwegian University of Science and Technology) in Trondheim.
