= Mahanakalan Khurd =

Mahana
- Village
- Mahana Kalan Khurd
- Nickname: mahana
- Location of Mahana in Uttar Pradesh
- Coordinates: 25°27′35″N 83°42′20″E
- Country: India
- State: Uttar Pradesh
- District: Ghazipur
- Established: 1700s

Government
  - Type: Gram panchayat
  - Body: Gram pradhan

Area
  - Total: 4.23 km^{2} (1.63 sq mi)
- Elevation: 72 m (236 ft)

Population (2011)
  - Total: 4,220

Languages
  - Official: Hindi
- Time zone: UTC+5:30 (IST)
- PIN: 232333 to** (** area code)
- Vehicle registration: UP 61
- Climate: BW (Köppen)

Mahana (also known as Islampur) is a Seorai town Of Ghazipur District, Uttar Pradesh, India.

== Historical population ==
Population Growth of Mahana
Year	Pop.	±%
1861	918	—
1871	1,000	+8.9%
1881	1,090	+9.0%
1891	1,250	+14.7%
1901	1,300	+4.0%
1911	1,340	+3.1%
1921	1,380	+3.0%
1931	1,450	+5.1%
1941	1,570	+8.3%
1951	1,690	+7.6%
1961	2,880	+70.4%
1971	3,400	+18.1%
1981	3,600	+5.9%
1991	3,780	+5.0%
2001	4,110	+8.7%
2011	4,220	+2.7%
Source:Census of India
