= Junior Science Talent Search Examination =

Scholarship examination in Delhi, India

Mukhyamantri Vigyan Pratibha Pariksha
- Acronym: MVPP
- Type: Objective (paper-based standardized test)
- Administrator: Delhi Directorate of Education
- Skills tested: Physics, Chemistry, Mathematics, Biology, Mental Ability, Social Science
- Year started: 2005
- Duration: (120 + 120) minutes
- Score range: 0 to 200
- Offered: Once (for grade 9 students only)
- Languages: English; Hindi
- Fee: Free
- Website: www.edudel.nic.in

Mukhyamantri Vigyan Pratibha Pariksha is an Indian scholarship exam conducted each January by the Science Branch of the Directorate of Education in Delhi. It is open to students of recognized schools in Delhi. 1000 students per year are awarded the scholarship.

== Eligibility ==
Any student studying in Class IX of a recognized school in Government or Government Aided/Public/KV (Kendriya Vidyalaya) /Navodaya/NDMC (North Delhi Municipal Corporation) schools and having earned at least 60% class VIII is eligible.

There is a strict policy in MVPP that the student should be studying in a school situated in Delhi or he / she cannot appear for the exam.

== Examination fee ==
There is no charge to enter the exam.

== Type of examination ==
The examination has two papers.

I. Mental Ability

- 100 questions 100 marks 120 minutes

II . General Science and Mathematics with Social Science

- 100 questions 100 marks 120 minutes

Although the time for attempting the MAT Section and the SAT Section (Mathematics & Science) is different, but the paper has to be submitted altogether soon after the writing time has finished

== Result declaration ==
The results of MVPP exam were generally released by end of February or in the first weeks of March. In 2021, along with the switch to the Mukhyamantri Vigyan Pratibha Pariksha name, the exam results were released on 28 May. Results are usually released on the Edudel portal.

== Number of scholarships ==
There are about 1000 scholarships awarded for MVPP per year.

In the notification that is released by the Science branch office of Govt. of Delhi, it is stated that an amount of Rs. 5000 will be awarded to top 1000 meritorious students.

== Reservations ==
Reservations are provided to participants belonging to SC, ST, OBC, Physically Handicapped and economically backward in Upper Caste categories accordance with the rules of Government of India and such candidates are declared qualified in JSTSE based on relaxed norms.

== See also ==
- KVPY
- IIT-JEE
- INMO
- INPHO
