= Megamarketing =

Megamarketing is a term coined by U.S. marketing academic, Philip Kotler, to describe the type of marketing activity required when it is necessary to manage elements of the firm's external environment (governments, the media, pressure groups, etc.) as well as the marketing variables; Kotler suggests that two more Ps must be added to the marketing mix: public relations and power.

The public relations element of Megamarketing focuses primarily on businesses familiarizing themselves with the surrounding community, prior to actually entering a desired market. Of note, the negotiations that occur as a consequence of this particular form of marketing are often far more rigorous than those associated with conventional marketing; as such, it is difficult to adequately satisfy both parties in an equitable manner. Marketers who choose to pursue these foreign environments must also look to appease the general public, as they can have a significant impact on the continuing profitability of their businesses. One important element comprising the general public involves the local media, as they can heavily influence the perception associated with newly emerging companies.

Contrarily, the power variable also proposed by Philip Kotler deals more so with the power to persuade third parties. This includes offering the correct incentives to entice expansion into foreign markets, in doing so, allowing for a controlling position when conducting business. Kotler's framework for power elucidates the importance of establishing strong ties with powerful political members in external markets; this, in turn, should enable ease of access to engage in commerce with these particular countries. Furthermore, this particular aspect of Megamarketing examines the means by which marketers go about incentivizing third parties, such as government organizations, in order to circumvent entry barriers.

If businesses are to successfully adopt this nuanced marketing strategy, it is important that they diversify their business operations and broaden their business scope within the marketplace. This, of course, must be executed whilst continuing to meet the demands of the consumers in the various markets. Additionally, Megamarketing success can be attained through acquiring employees with the correct skill sets; likewise, having a desirable mix of resources on hand at the companies disposal. This broadened form of marketing is typically associated with a long-decision making process; this can be attributed to the fact that it takes a substantial amount of time to coordinate meetings at the same time requiring larger sums of money in an attempt to finance these augmented business endeavors.

Megamarketing is different from traditional marketing in that its primary objective is grounded in expanding operations into external markets. This, in turn, makes it conducive to companies seeking foreign expansion to introduce new products and services to broaden consumer demands. In essence, it seeks to transform the types of industries that are prevalent in an existing market, however, these changes can often come at the expense of over imposing on others. So much so, in fact, that many Megamarketers run the risk of being perceived in a more negative light
