= Genetics and Molecular Research =

Journal of biology and medicine

- Discipline: Biology, medicine, molecular biology
- Language: English
- Edited by: Francisco A. Moura Duarte

Publication details
- History: 2002–present
- Publisher: FUNEPC-RP, Ribeirao Preto, SP (Brazil)
- Frequency: Monthly
- Open access: Yes
- License: Creative Commons Attribution NonCommercial-License
- Impact factor: 0.765 (2016)

Standard abbreviations
- ISO 4: Genet. Mol. Res.

Indexing
- ISSN: 1676-5680 (print); 1676-5680 (web)
- OCLC no.: 49991921

Links
- Journal homepage; Online archive

The Genetics and Molecular Research Journal is a peer-reviewed open-access scientific journal in the fields of biology and medicine, edited and published monthly in the fields of genetics, molecular biology, proteomics, genomics and evolution. The journal was listed on Beall's list before it was taken down in 2017. A hijacked journal was also setup at geneticsmr.org by the Pulsus Group, unlike the legitimate geneticsmr.com operated by FUNEPC-RP.

According to the Journal Citation Reports, the journal has a 2016 impact factor of 0.765.

== History ==
The journal was established in 2002 by Francisco A. Moura Duarte and its honorary editor is Pedro Henrique Saldanha.

== Abstracting and indexing ==
The journal is abstracted and indexed in:

- MEDLINE
- Science Citation Index
- Current Contents/Life Sciences
- Biological Abstracts
- Excerpta Medica
- Biological Abstracts
- BIOSIS Previews
- CAB Abstracts
- Chemical Abstracts Service
- EBSCO databases
- Excerpta Medica/Embase
- Scopus
