= Jama Mosque, Dildar Nagar =

Mosque in Dildarnagar, Uttar Pradesh, India

Jama Masjid
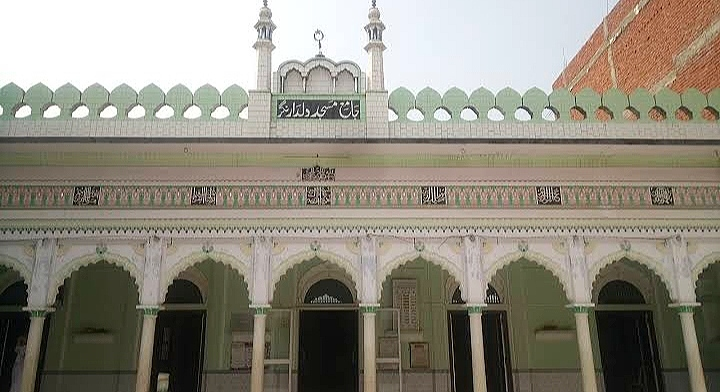
- The mosque in 2021

- Location of the mosque in Uttar Pradesh

Religion
- Affiliation: Islam
- Ecclesiastical or organizational status: Friday mosque
- Status: Active

Location
- Location: Dildarnagar, Ghazipur District, Uttar Pradesh
- Country: India
- Interactive map of Jama Masjid
- Coordinates: 25°25′17″N 83°40′11″E

Architecture
- Type: Mosque architecture
- Completed: 1705

Specifications
- Length: 33 m (108 ft)
- Width: 21 m (68 ft)
- Height (max): 11 m (35 ft)

The Jama Masjid, also known as the Jama Mosque, is a Friday mosque in Dildarnagar, in the Ghazipur District of the state of Uttar Pradesh, India. The 18th-century mosque is the oldest mosque in the village, and is situated 500 metres (1,600 ft) from the railway junction on Railway Station Road.

== See also ==
- Islam in India
- List of mosques in India
