= Gahmar railway station =

Railway station in Uttar Pradesh, India

General information
- Location: Gahmar, Ghazipur, Uttar Pradesh; India
- Coordinates: 25.4889°N 83.8040°E
- Elevation: 68 metres (223 ft)
- System: Indian Railways station
- Owner: Indian Railways
- Operator: East Central Railway
- Line: Patna–Mughalsarai section
- Platforms: 2
- Tracks: 2
- Connections: Auto stand

Construction
- Structure type: Standard (on-ground station)
- Parking: Yes
- Cycle facilities: No

Other information
- Status: Double electric line
- Station code: GMR
- Zone(s): East Central Railway
- Division(s): Danapur

Services
Computerised Reservation System
Location
- Location within India Location within Uttar Pradesh

Gahmar railway station is a small railway station in Ghazipur district, Uttar Pradesh. Its code is GMR. It serves largest village of India Gahmar village and locality. Gahmar is the nearest rail station to Maa Kamakhya Dham Temple.

The station consists of two platforms with a foot overbridge. The platform is now well sheltered, well furnished. It consists basic facilities including water and sanitation, waiting room, rain shades, a canteen, water cooler, fan and lighting. The station lies on Patna–Mughalsarai section.
