= National Standard Examination in Biology =

Examination for secondary school students in India

The National Standard Examination in Biology or NSEB is an examination for biology for higher secondary school students in India, usually conducted in the end of November. The examination is organized by the Association of Teachers in Biological Sciences in association with Indian Association of Physics Teachers and Homi Bhabha Centre for Science Education (HBCSE). Each year over 30,000 students of 12th Standard or below, sit for this examination.

== Eligibility ==
The examination is intended for students in 12th standard, though 11th and 10th standard students are also allowed to give the examination. Usually, the qualifying students are from 12th standard.

== Qualification ==
There is a designated statewise quota according to which the students are selected for the next stage i.e. INBO. Further all students scoring greater than 80% of the average of the top ten scores at national level (called as Merit Index Score) get automatically selected irrespective of the statewise quota. Usually the top 1% students from this examination are selected to sit for the Indian National Biology Olympiad.

== Format ==
The NSEB comprises only multiple-choice questions where answers are to be bubbled in on an OMR sheet. The questions include plant physiology, genetics, cytology, human physiology, and ecology, although basic knowledge in science and maths (Class X level) is expected. The stress on biochemistry and ecology is more in the NSEB than in the typical school syllabi.

There are 60 questions in total, divided into two sections – A1 and A2. A1 consists of 48 questions, where there is only one correct answer. Three marks are awarded for a correct answer, while one mark is deducted from the total if the answer is wrong. No marks are awarded or deducted for unattempted. A2 consists of multiple-answer questions wherein six marks are awarded if all suitable options in the question are marked with no wrong marking. Zero marks are awarded for unattempted, wrong, or incomplete bubbling.

== Fee ==
As per the new revised norms, the fee for the NSEB is ₹300 (US$3.50). Application for this examination is typically handled through the school/college to which the student is affiliated.

== Indian National Biology Olympiad ==
It's held in January and consists of objective as well as subjective questions. The top 35 performers here are selected for the Orientation-Cum-Selection-Camp (OCSC) Biology held at HBCSE, Mumbai. At the OCSC, students are trained and tested in both theory and experiment, and finally, the top 4 students are selected to represent India at the International Biology Olympiad (IBO).
