= Government School Teachers Association =

AAM Aadmi party delhi Education system

Government School Teachers Association Delhi

Location
- Old Secretariat, Delhi Delhi India

District information
- Type: Public
- Motto: Teachers Unity Zindabad
- Schools: 2400

Students and staff
- Students: 1,700,000
- Teachers: 40,000
- Student–teacher ratio: 1:40 (primary level); 1:42 (middle level); 1:48 (secondary and senior secondary level)

Other information
- General Secretary: Ajay Veer Yadav

Government School Teachers Association (GSTA) Delhi is a teachers' union recognized by the Delhi Government, India, which represents teachers serving under the Delhi Government. The current elected General Secretary of GSTA is Ajay Veer Yadav. Master Azad Singh, ex-Mayor, North Delhi MCD contested in these elections. Teacher groups actively contributing in the functioning of GSTA include Adhyapak Shakti Manch.
