= National Standard Examination in Chemistry =

School examination in India

The National Standard Examination in Chemistry or NSEC is an examination in chemistry for higher secondary school students in India, usually conducted in the end of November. The examination is organized by the Indian Association of Chemistry Teachers. Over 30,000 students, mainly from Standard 12, sit for this examination.

== Eligibility ==
Students studying in Class 12, Class 11 and Class 10 are allowed to take the examination. They must not be appearing in NSEJS for that particular year and they must be eligible to hold an Indian passport.

== Importance ==
The top 1% students from this examination are selected to sit for the Indian National Chemistry Olympiad. The theory part of the examination is held in the last week of January. The top 30 among all students are selected for the Orientation-Cum-Selection-Camp (OCSC), Chemistry.

== Format ==
The NSEC contains only multiple choice questions. The questions include physical chemistry, organic chemistry, and inorganic chemistry. The stress on biochemistry is more in the NSEC than in the typical school syllabi.

== Fee ==
As per the new revised norms the fee for the NSEC is about Rs. 1500. Application for this examination is typically handled through the school/college to which the student is affiliated.

== See also ==
- Indian National Chemistry Olympiad
- India at the IPhO
