= Gaura, Ghazipur =

Gaura
- Village
- Location in Uttar Pradesh, India
- Country: India
- State: Uttar Pradesh
- District: Ghazipur
- Established: 1700; 326 years ago

Government
  - Type: Panchayati Raj (India)
  - Body: Gram Pradhan

Area
  - Total: 358.81 ha (886.6 acres)
- Elevation: 70 m (230 ft)

Population (2011)
  - Total: 3,024
  - Density: 842.8/km^{2} (2,183/sq mi)

Languages
  - Official: Bhojpuri, Hindi, Urdu
- Time zone: UTC+5:30 (IST)
- PIN: 232326
- Telephone code: 05497
- Vehicle registration: UP 61

Gaura is a village in Ghazipur District of Uttar Pradesh, India

== See also ==
- Suhwal
