= Dildarnagar Junction railway station =

Railway station in Uttar Pradesh, India

DILDARNAGAR JUNCTION

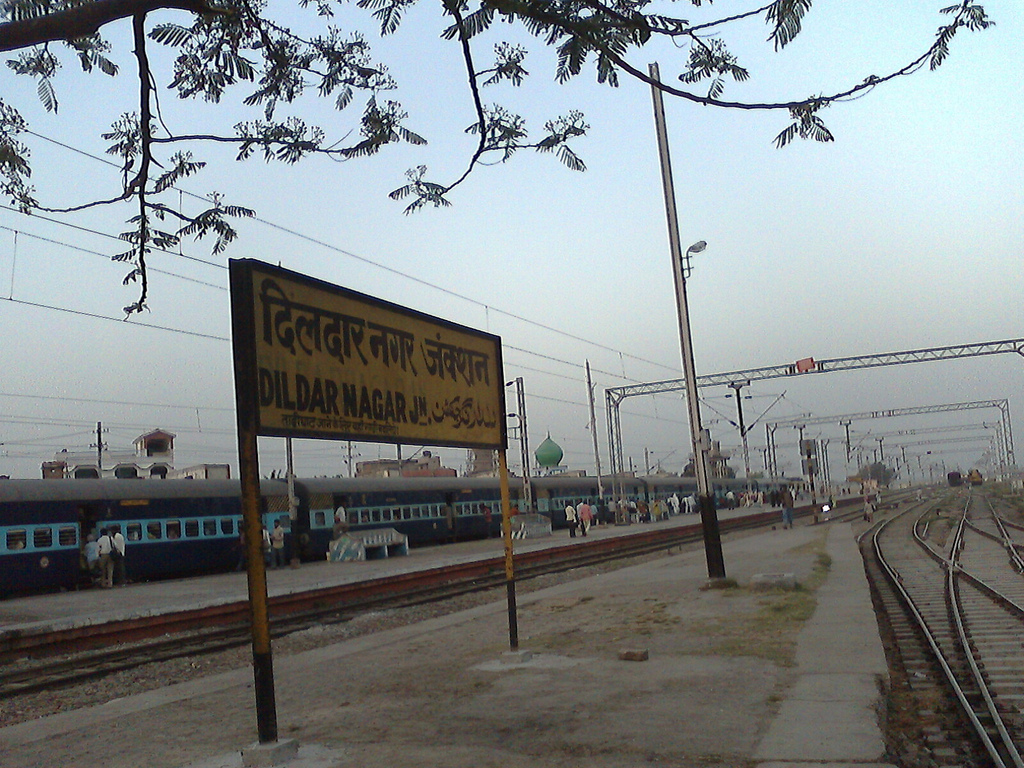
- View of Dildarnagar Junction

General information
- Location: Dildarnagar, Ghazipur, Uttar Pradesh; India
- Coordinates: 25.4194°N 83.6682°E
- Elevation: 72 metres (236 ft)
- System: Indian Railways station
- Owner: Indian Railways
- Operator: East Central Railway
- Lines: Howrah–Delhi main line Dildarnagar–Ghazipur branch line
- Platforms: 4
- Tracks: 5

Construction
- Structure type: Standard (on-ground station)
- Parking: Available
- Cycle facilities: Available

Other information
- Station code: DLN
- Zone(s): East Central Railway
- Division(s): Danapur
- Fare zone: East Central Railway

Passengers
- 15,000 per day
Services
Preceding station	Indian Railways	Following station
Usia Khas Halt towards Patna Junction or Howrah Junction	Howrah–Delhi main line Patna–Mughalsarai section	Darauli towards Mughalsarai Junction or New Delhi
Terminus	Dildarnagar–Tarighat branch line	Sarahula Halt towards Tarighat
Route map
- Source: Google maps 13039 Howrah–Delhi Janata Express
Location
- Location within Uttar Pradesh Location within India
- Interactive map of Dildarnagar Junction

Dildarnagar Junction railway station is a railway station in Dildarnagar, Uttar Pradesh. It serves 10,000 passengers, making it the busiest railway station in the Ghazipur district. It is the junction where the Dildarnagar–Tarighat branch line is separated from Howrah–Delhi main line. For many years the main line of the East Indian Railway which crosses the District south of the Ganges was the only line, but a branch was subsequently made from Dildarnagar to Tarighat.

== History ==
A branch line from Dildarnagar was constructed as a provincial state railway in year 1862. This branch with a station at Nagsar and its terminus at Tarighat was opened on the south bank of Ganga, opposite Ghazipur 19.31 km (12.00 mi) from Dildarnagar.

== Gallery ==
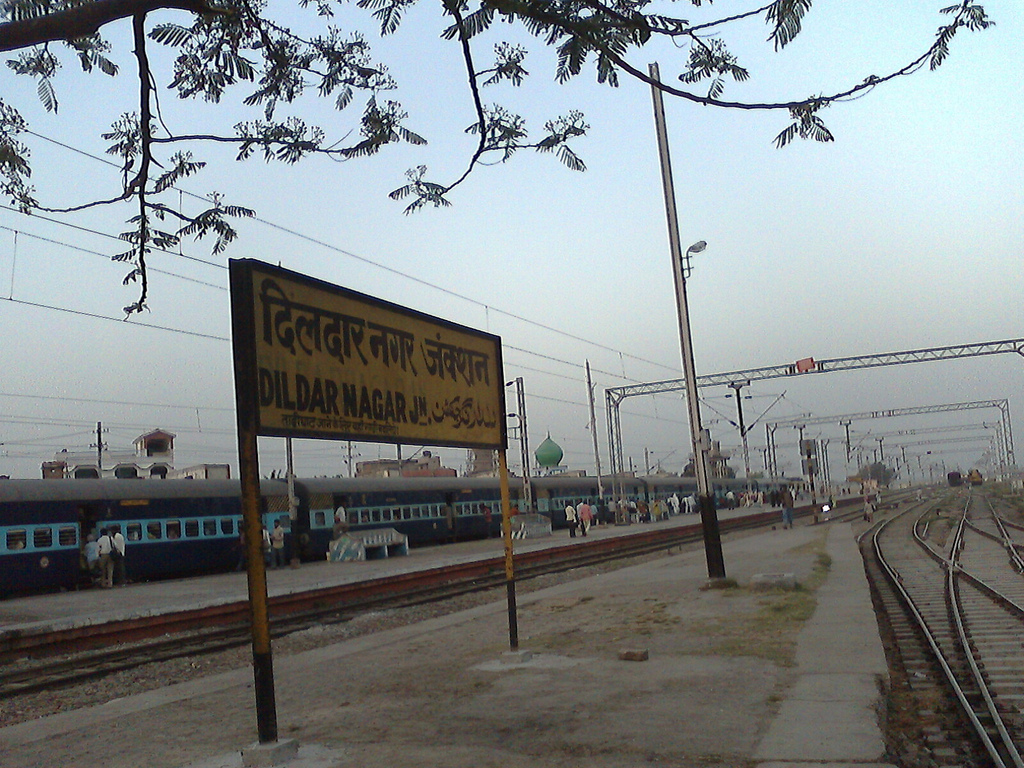
Dildarnagar Junction during the monsoon

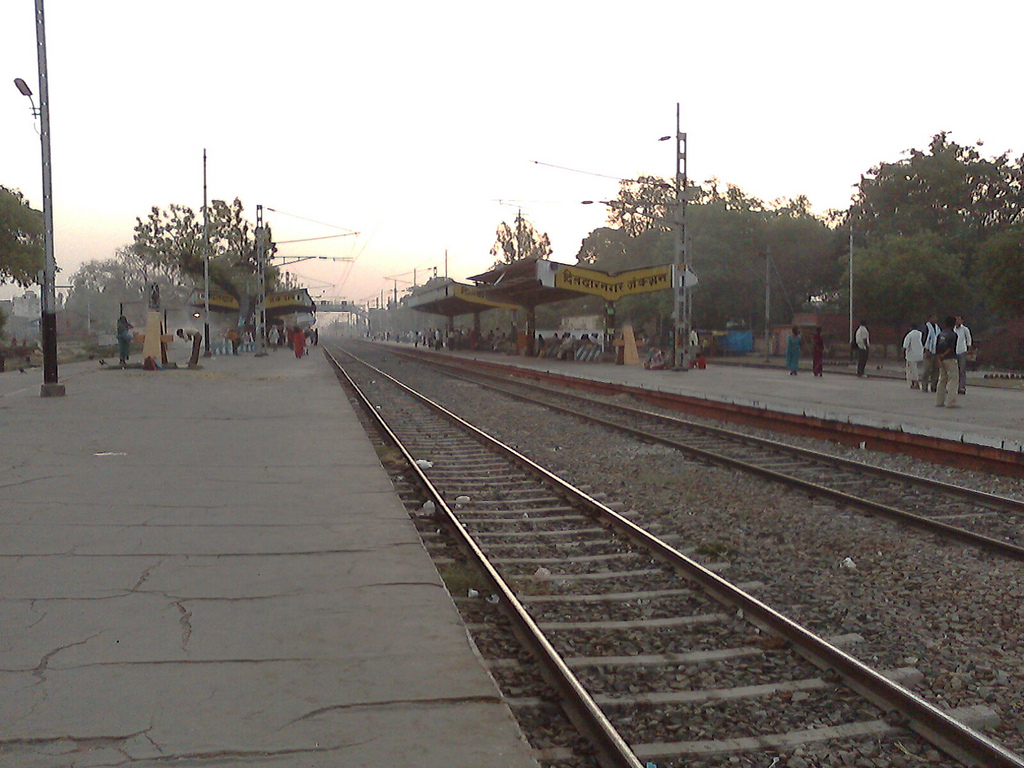
Station signboard of Dildarnagar Junction in Hindi, English and Urdu

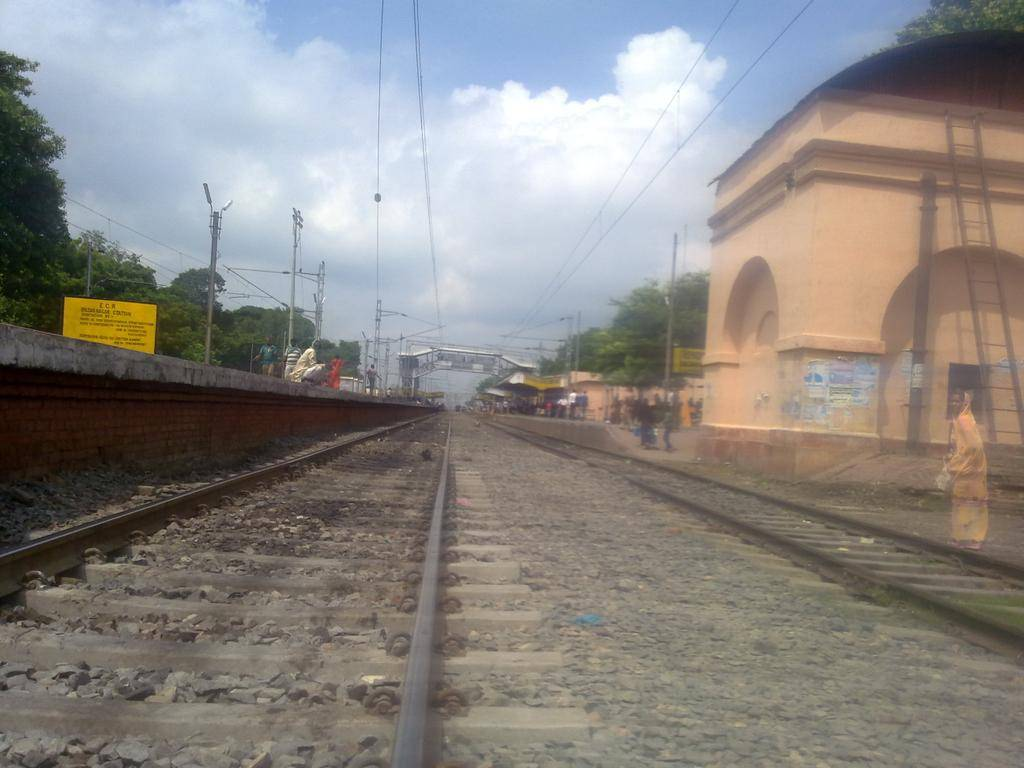

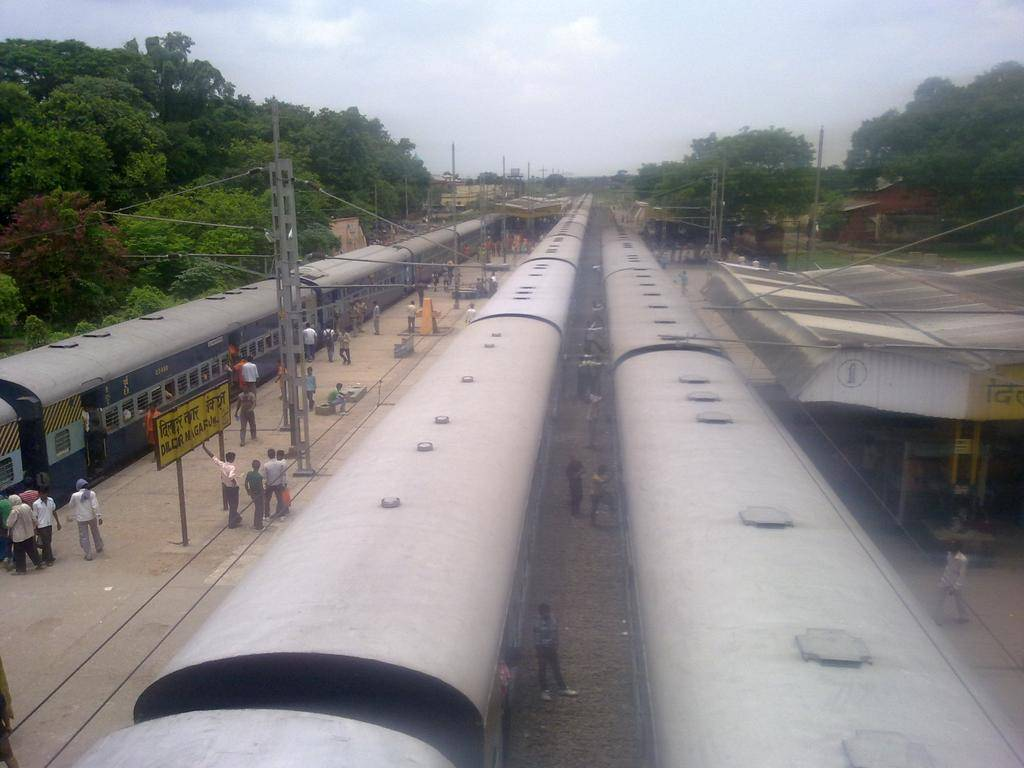

Dildarnagar Junction at night
