= Ramaval =

Ramwal
- village
- Interactive map of Ramwal
- Country: India
- State: Uttar Pradesh
- District: Ghazipur

Government
  - Body: Gram panchayat

Population (2011)
  - Total: 3,319

Languages
  - Official: Hindi
- Time zone: UTC+5:30 (IST)
- Vehicle registration: UP
- Website: up.gov.in

Ramaval is a village in Ghazipur District located in the Indian state of Uttar Pradesh.
