= Tilwa, Ghazipur =

Tilwa Rajmalpur
- village
- Country: India
- State: Uttar Pradesh
- District: Ghazipur
- Established: 1532; 494 years ago
- Founder: Raja Rajmal Rao

Government
  - Body: Gram panchayat

Area
  - Total: 614.87 ha (1,519.4 acres)

Population (2011)
  - Total: 3,420
  - Density: 556/km^{2} (1,440/sq mi)

Languages
  - Official: Hindi
- Time zone: UTC+5:30 (IST)
- Vehicle registration: UP

Tilwa is a village in Zamania tehsil in Ghazipur District located in Uttar Pradesh, India.
