= Homi Bhabha Centre for Science Education =

Science research centre in Mumbai, india

Coordinates: 19.042337°N 72.928266°E

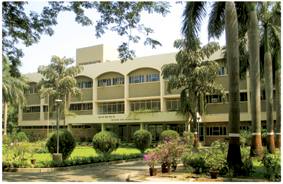
- HBCSE Building
- Type: Research Institution
- Established: 1983
- Founders: Dr. Raghunath G. Lagu, V. G. Kulkarni
- Director: Prof. Arnab Bhattacharya
- Location: Mumbai, India
- Campus: Urban
- Website: www.hbcse.tifr.res.in

Homi Bhabha Centre for Science Education (HBCSE) is a National Centre of the Tata Institute of Fundamental Research (TIFR), Mumbai, India. The broad goals of the institute are to promote equity and excellence in science and mathematics education from primary school to undergraduate college level, and encourage the growth of scientific literacy in the India. To these ends it carries out a wide spectrum of inter-related activities, which may be viewed under three broad categories:

- Research and development,
- Teacher orientation and science popularisation
- Olympiads and other students' nurture programmes

It is India's nodal centre for Olympiad programmes in mathematics, physics, chemistry, biology and astronomy. Another major program of HBCSE is the National Initiative on Undergraduate Science (NIUS).

HBCSE runs a graduate school in science and mathematics education. Students admitted to HBCSE Graduate School work for the degree of Ph.D. in Science Education, which is a degree of TIFR (Deemed University).

== Notable staff ==
Centre Director:
| Term | Member | Notes |
|---|---|---|
| 1974–1994 | V. G. Kulkarni | Founder Director, began his career in 1953 at the Tata Institute of Fundamental Research, Mumbai |
| 1994–2008 | Arvind Kumar | 2nd Director, from Maharashtra, India, won the Padma Shri Award in 2011 for his contributions in the field of literature and education |
| 2008–2011 | Dr. Hemchandra Chintamani Pradhan | 3rd Director, since July 2012, Pradhan has been associated, as a Raja Ramanna Fellow of the Department of Atomic Energy, Govt. of India |
| 2011–2016 | Jayashree Ramadas | 4th Director |
| 2016 | K. Subramaniam | 5th Director |

== Achievements: European Girls' Mathematical Olympiad ==
At the 15th edition of European Girls' Mathematical Olympiad held in Bordeaux, France in April 2026, Shreya Shantanu Mundhada became the first Indian to win a gold medal at EGMO, as India secured its best-ever team ranking of 6th place among 67 participating countries, winning one gold, one silver, and one bronze medal
