= Fatehpur Lok Sabha constituency =

Constituency of the Indian parliament in Uttar Pradesh

Coordinates: 25.92°N 80.81°E

Fatehpur UP-71
- Lok Sabha constituency
- Interactive Map Outlining Fatehpur Lok Sabha constituency

Constituency details
- Country: India
- Region: North India
- State: Uttar Pradesh
- Assembly constituencies: Jahanabad; Bindki; Fatehpur; Ayah Shah; Husainganj; Khaga
- Established: 1957
- Reservation: None

Member of Parliament
- 18th Lok Sabha
- Incumbent Naresh Uttam Patel
- Party: Samajwadi Party
- Elected year: 2024

Fatehpur Lok Sabha constituency is one of the 80 Lok Sabha (parliamentary) constituencies in Uttar Pradesh state in northern India. This constituency covers the entire Fatehpur district.

== Vidhan Sabha segments ==
- Most Lok Sabha constituencies in Uttar Pradesh have five assembly segments under them, but Fatehpur Lok Sabha seat comprises six Vidhan Sabha segments.

No	Name	District	Member	Party	2024 Lead
238	Jahanabad	Fatehpur	Rajendra Singh Patel	BJP	SP
239	Bindki	Fatehpur	Jai Kumar Singh Jaiki	AD(S)	SP
240	Fatehpur	Fatehpur	Chandra Prakash Lodhi	SP	SP
241	Ayah Shah	Fatehpur	Vikas Gupta	BJP	BJP
242	Husainganj	Fatehpur	Usha Maurya	SP	SP
243	Khaga (SC)	Fatehpur	Krishna Paswan	BJP	BJP

== Members of Parliament ==
Year	Member	Party
1957	Ansar Harvani	Indian National Congress
1962	Gauri Shankar	Independent
1967	Sant Bux Singh	Indian National Congress
1971	Sant Bux Singh	Indian National Congress
1977	Bashir Ahmad	Janata Party
1978^	Liaquat Husain	Janata Party
1980	Hari Krishna Shastri	Indian National Congress (I)
1984	Hari Krishna Shastri	Indian National Congress
1989	Vishwanath Pratap Singh	Janata Dal
1991	Vishwanath Pratap Singh	Janata Dal
1996	Vishambhar Prasad Nishad	Bahujan Samaj Party
1998	Ashok Kumar Patel	Bharatiya Janata Party
1999	Ashok Kumar Patel	Bharatiya Janata Party
2004	Mahendra Prasad Nishad	Bahujan Samaj Party
2009	Rakesh Sachan	Samajwadi Party
2014	Niranjan Jyoti	Bharatiya Janata Party
2019	Niranjan Jyoti	Bharatiya Janata Party
2024	Naresh Uttam Patel	Samajwadi Party

== Election results ==
=== General election 2024 ===
2024 Indian general election: Fatehpur
Party	Candidate	Votes	%	±%
SP	Naresh Uttam Patel	500,328	45.20	▲45.20
BJP	Niranjan Jyoti	4,67,129	42.20	▼12.04
BSP	Manish Sachan	90,970	8.22	▼27.02
NOTA	None of the Above	8,120	0.73	▼0.68
Majority		33,199	3.00	▼16.0
Turnout		11,06,944	57.10	▲0.31
SP gain from BJP		Swing		

=== General election 2019 ===
2019 Indian general election: Fatehpur
Party	Candidate	Votes	%	±%
BJP	Niranjan Jyoti	566,040	54.24	+8.27
BSP	Sukhdev Prasad Verma	3,67,835	35.24	+6.98
INC	Rakesh Sachan	66,077	6.33	+1.92
NOTA	None of the Above	14,692	1.41	+0.31
Majority		1,98,205	19.00	+1.29
Turnout		10,44,489	56.79	
BJP hold		Swing	+8.27	

=== General election 2014 ===
2014 Indian general election: Fatehpur
Party	Candidate	Votes	%	±%
BJP	Niranjan Jyoti	4,85,994	45.97	+29.31
BSP	Afzal Siddiqui	2,98,788	28.26	+4.25
SP	Rakesh Sachan	1,79,724	17.00	−14.53
INC	Usha Maurya	46,588	4.41	−10.26
AITC	Ramkrishna Tripathi	7,578	0.72	+0.72
NOTA	None of the Above	11,607	1.10	+1.10
Majority		1,87,206	17.71	+10.19
Turnout		10.57.192	58.58	+13.39
BJP gain from SP		Swing	+14.44	

=== General election 2009 ===
2009 Indian general election: Fatehpur
Party	Candidate	Votes	%	±%
SP	Rakesh Sachan	218,953	31.53	
BSP	Mahendra Prasad Nishad	166,725	24.01	
BJP	Radhey Shyam Gupta	115,712	16.66	
INC	Vibhakar Shastri	101,853	14.67	
IND.	Narsingh Patel	23,488	3.38	
NCP	Jageshwar Pal	10,693	1.54	
Majority		52,228	7.52	
Turnout		694,383	45.19	
SP gain from BSP		Swing		

=== 2004 ===
2004 Indian general election: Fatehpur
Party	Candidate	Votes	%	±%
BSP	Mahendra Prasad Nishad	163,568	32.28	
SP	Achal Singh	1,11,000	21.91	
BJP	Ashok Patel	1,01,484	20.03	
INC	Khan Gufran Jahidi	92,741	18.30	
IND	2 Independent Candidates	14,202	2.80	
OTH	4 Other Party Candidates	23,704	4.68	
Majority		52,568	10.37	
Turnout		5,06,699		
BSP gain from BJP		Swing		

=== 1999 ===
1999 Indian general election: Fatehpur
Party	Candidate	Votes	%	±%
BJP	Ashok Patel	142,911	26.54	
BSP	Surya Bali Nishad	1,41,848	26.35	
SP	Vishambhar Prasad Nishad	1,22,060	22.67	
INC	Vibhakar Shashtri	94,032	17.47	
IND	9 Independent Candidates	13,056	2.43	
OTH	3 Other Party Candidates	24,481	4.55	
Majority		1,063	0.19	
Turnout		5,45,594	46.59	
BJP hold		Swing		

=== General election 1998 ===
1998 Indian general election: Fatehpur
Party	Candidate	Votes	%	±%
BJP	Ashok Kumar Patel	232,131	39.62	
BSP	Vishambhar Prasad Nishad	185,695	31.69	
SP	Devendra Pratap Singh	123,662	21.10	
INC	Vibhakar Shastri	24,688	4.21	
AD	Ram Kripal Prajpati	12,313	2.10	
JD	Krishna Kumar Misra	5,563	0.95	
Independent	Jag Lal	1,631	0.28	
Ajeya Bharat Party	Vishnu Dutt Dubey	997	0.17	
Majority		46,436	7.93	
Turnout		586,680		
BJP gain from BSP		Swing		

== See also ==
- Fatehpur district
- List of constituencies of the Lok Sabha

Lok Sabha
Preceded by Amethi	Constituency represented by the prime minister 1989-1990	Succeeded by Ballia
