= Amauli =

Computer Coaching institute
- Shreya Computer Institute & Shorthand Coaching

Coordinates: 26°01′N 80°18′E

Amauli is a village situated in Uttar Pradesh, India. It is one of the 13 block headquarter of Fatehpur District. Its population is about 15000. There are 50 government and private schools and colleges situated in the 5 km radius of Amauli. One government CHC and many private hospitals are here. There are three branches of nationalized banks located here, these are Punjab National Bank, Bank of Baroda and Central Bank of India. The Postal Index Number (PIN) of Amauli is 212631. All mobile operator services are available here. It is the fourth biggest market of Fatehpur district. It is connected by roadways with all major cities of Uttar Pradesh.

== Name ==
According to Paul Whalley, the name Amaulī may ultimately come from a hypothetical reconstructed name *Āmra-pallikā, meaning "mango village".

== Schools ==
- Sbgp Inter College Amauli-Fatehpur
- Shri Dulichand Inter College Amauli-Fatehpur
- Ganeshchandra balika Inter College Amauli-Fatehpur
- Sarswati shishu mandir School Amauli-Fatehpur
- Gramin Siksha Sadan Jr. High School Amauli-Fatehpur
- St. Garoor Education Centre
- Amauli - fatehpur
- LPD public school amuali fatehpur
- Kids Dream land JHS Anjali Fatehpur
- Shreya Computer Institute and Shorthand Coaching

== Banks ==
- Panjab National Bank
- Bank of Baroda
- Central bank of India
- Baroda up gramin bank
- Post bank of India

== Other information ==
STD Code	PIN	V.R.N.	Sub-Division	District	Commissionerate	State	Police Station	Nearest Railway St	Nearest Airport
05181	212631	UP71	Bindki	Fatehpur	Allahabad	Uttar Pradesh	Chandpur	Hamirpur Road, Kanpur	Chakeri, Amausi
