= Radhe Shyam Gupta =

Indian politician

Radhey Shyam Gupta

Member of Legislative Assembly, Uttar Pradesh
- In office 2007–12
- Preceded by: Anand Prakash Lodhi
- Succeeded by: Syed Qasim Hasan
- Constituency: Fatehpur

Personal details
- Born: 5 March 1935 Fatehpur (Uttar Pradesh)
- Party: Bharatiya Janata Party
- Children: Bablu Gupta, Gopal Gupta
- Parent(s): Mr. Shital Prasad (father) & Mrs. Rama Devi (mother).
- Relatives: Rama Agrahari
- Education: B.A.
- Alma mater: Kanpur University
- Occupation: Politician, Businessperson

Radhe Shyam Gupta is an Indian politician from the Bharatiya Janata Party. He represented Fatehpur assembly constituency of Uttar Pradesh as Member of Legislative Assembly three times. In 1997, Shri Gupta served as Institutional Finance Minister of state Uttar Pradesh in Kalyan Singh's cabinet. He was assigned to Ministry of Law and Justice in Rajnath Singh's government in 2002. He became BJP Vice President of state Uttar Pradesh in 2013.

== Early life and education ==
Radhe Shyam was born in Fatehpur, India. He has pursued Bachelor's degree in Arts from Kanpur University in 1965. By profession, Gupta is a business person.

== Political career ==
From the Bhartiya Janata Party ticket, Radhe Shyam Gupta stood first time in Uttar Pradesh Legislative Assembly election of 1991. He was defeated by Janata Dal's candidate Sy. Qasim Hasan by margin of 29.18% votes.

Gupta successfully contested the 1993, 1996 and 2002 assembly elections and represented Fatehpur Vidhan Sabha constituency of Fatehpur district, Uttar Pradesh. In 1993, Radhe Shyam received 39.41% votes; defeating Bahujan Samaj Party's politician Suryapal Lodhi. He was again elected as Member of Legislative Assembly in 1996 assembly election. In 1996, he defeated BSP's Om Prakash Verma "Lodhi" by securing 35.47% votes. Radhe Shyam Gupta was in the cabinet of Kalyan Singh and served as institutional finance minister.

== See also ==
- Fatehpur (Lok Sabha constituency)
