= Vikram Singh (Uttar Pradesh politician) =

Indian politician

Member of Legislative Assembly, Uttar Pradesh
- In office May 2014 – March 2022
- Preceded by: Syed Qasim Hasan
- Constituency: Fatehpur
- Succeeded by: Chandra Prakash Lodhi

Personal details
- Born: 20 May 1967 (age 59) Kanpur
- Party: Bharatiya Janata Party
- Spouse: Mala Dhawan Singh
- Children: 2
- Education: Graduate
- Profession: Politician

Vikram Singh is an Indian politician from Fatehpur, Uttar Pradesh, affiliated with Bhartiya Janata Party. He is member of Uttar Pradesh Legislative Assembly, won election in 2014.

== See also ==
- Fatehpur (Lok Sabha constituency)
