= Karan Singh Patel =

Indian politician

Member of Legislative Assembly, Uttar Pradesh
- In office 11 March 2017 – 10 March 2022
- Preceded by: Sukhdev Prasad Verma
- Succeeded by: Jai Kumar Singh Jaiki
- Constituency: Bindki

Personal details
- Born: 10 June 1951; Fatehpur, Uttar Pradesh
- Political party: Bharatiya Janata Party
- Spouse: Shanti Singh Patel (m. 1969)
- Children: Two Sons
- Education: M. A., B. Ed.
- Profession: Agriculturist

Karan Singh Patel is an Indian politician and member of the Uttar Pradesh Legislative Assembly.
