= Ashok Kumar Patel =

Indian politician

Member of Parliament, Lok Sabha
- In office 1998–2004
- Preceded by: Vishambhar Prasad Nishad
- Succeeded by: Mahendra Prasad Nishad
- Constituency: Fatehpur, Uttar Pradesh

Personal details
- Born: 30 June 1954 (age 71) Hariyapur, Fatehpur District, Uttar Pradesh, India
- Party: Bharatiya Janata Party
- Other political affiliations: Samajwadi Party
- Spouse: Kusum Singh
- Children: Abhinav Patel, Swapnil Singh, Priyanka Singh, Ruchi Singh, Prateek Singh

Ashok Kumar Patel is an Indian politician. He was a Member of Parliament, representing Fatehpur, Uttar Pradesh in the Lok Sabha, the lower house of India's Parliament as a member of the Bharatiya Janata Party.
