= Jodha Singh Ataiya =

Indian revolutionary (c. 1820–1858)

Thakur Jodha Singh Ataiya
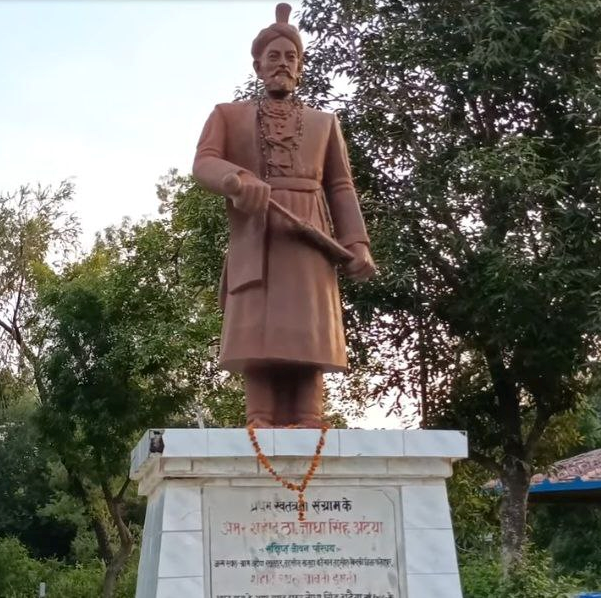
- Statue of Jodha Singh Ataiya at Bawani Imli Memorial, Fatehpur
- Born: c. 1820s Rasulpur, Khajuha, Fatehpur district, North-Western Provinces, British India
- Died: 28 April 1858; Khajuha, Fatehpur district, British India
- Cause of death: Execution by hanging in Bawani Imli massacre
- Occupations: Zamindar, Revolutionary
- Known for: Leadership during the Indian Rebellion of 1857

Thakur Jodha Singh Ataiya (c. 1820s – 28 April 1858) (Hindi: जोधा सिंह अटैया) was an Indian zamindar and revolutionary from Rasulpur (Rasulpur Ataiya) village in Fatehpur district, Uttar Pradesh. He played a pivotal role in the Indian Rebellion of 1857 by organising armed resistance against British colonial forces. He led the seizure of the Fatehpur treasury, engaged in guerrilla warfare, and became a prominent freedom fighter in north-central India before being executed by British forces during the Bawani Imli massacre with his 51 revolutionaries.

== Early life ==
Jodha Singh was born into a Rajput family in Rasulpur, a village near Khajuha in present-day Fatehpur district. As a landholder (zamindar), he enjoyed a position of social influence, which he later used to mobilise support against British rule. His ideological leanings were shaped by the growing unrest across India and revolutionary contemporaries like Rani Lakshmibai and Tatya Tope.

== Role in the 1857 Rebellion ==
During the Indian Rebellion of 1857, Jodha Singh emerged as a key leader in the Fatehpur region. He collaborated with Deputy Collector Hikmat Ullah Khan and fellow revolutionary Thakur Daryao Singh. Together, they captured the Fatehpur treasury and civil court, challenging British administrative control.

He rallied thousands of peasants in Khajuha and Bindki areas and took to guerrilla warfare, famously defeating Colonel Powell in direct engagement.

== Capture and Execution ==
On 28 April 1858, following betrayal by informants, Jodha Singh and 51 of his companions were arrested by British forces near Ghoora village. All 52 were publicly hanged from a large tamarind tree near Khajuha, now known as the Bawani Imli massacre. The British left the bodies hanging for 37 days as a warning, prohibiting any cremation. However, on the night of 3 June 1858, Maharaja Bhawani Singh and local supporters retrieved the remains and performed the final rites at Shivrajpur Ghat on the Ganges.

== Legacy ==
Jodha Singh is commemorated as one of the first freedom fighters from central Uttar Pradesh. His name is inscribed on the memorial stones at the Bawani Imli site. The tamarind tree, believed by locals to have stopped growing after the incident, remains a historic symbol of sacrifice.

In 2025, a book was released in Bindki to document the full story of Jodha Singh and the Bawani Imli martyrs, supported by local scholars and government officials.

To honour his legacy, a government-run institution — the Amar Shaheed Jodha Singh Attaiya Thakur Dariyao Singh Medical College, Fatehpur — was named after him in Fatehpur.

== Bibliography ==
- Darakht: The Witness of Freedom Fighter (Hindi) by Vijay Narayan. Bluerose Publishers, 2025. ISBN 978-93-6261-492-6

== See also ==
- Bawani Imli massacre
- Indian Rebellion of 1857
- Fatehpur district
