= Mahendra Pratap Singh =

Indian Hindi author (1930–2022)

Dr Mahendra Pratap Singh
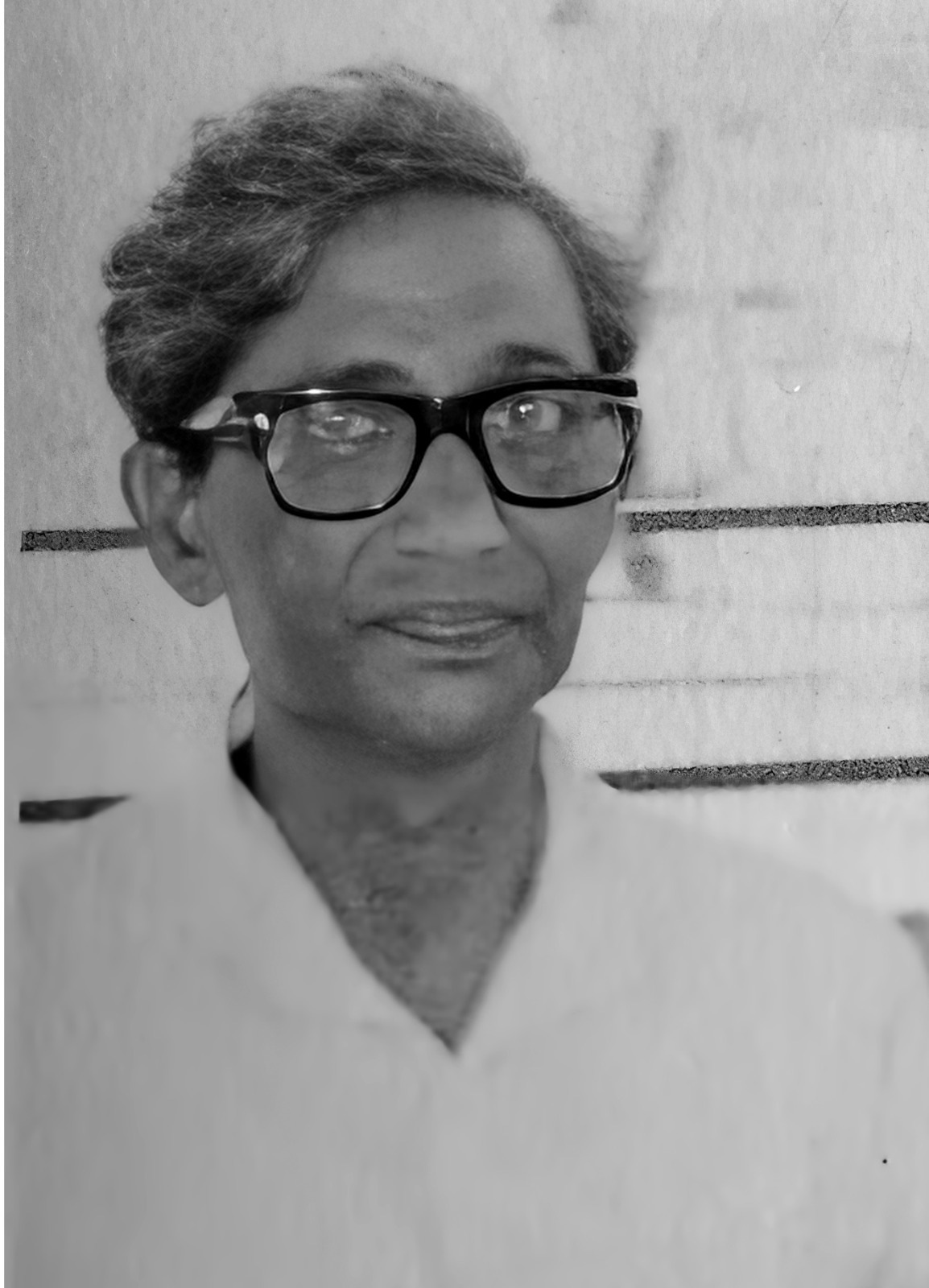
- Born: 19 January 1930; Fatehpur, India
- Died: 10 December 2022 (aged 92); Delhi
- Education: Vikramjit Singh Sanatan Dharma College, Kanpur (B.A., M.A.); Maharaja Sayajirao University of Baroda (PhD)
- Occupation: Lecturer
- Writing career
- Period: 1948–2022
- Genres: History, Literature
- Notable works: Shivaji Bhakha Sources and Nationalism; Etihasik Pramanavali aur Chhatrasal; Ritikaleen Hindi Sahitya Ki Atihasik Vyakhya; Bhagwantrai Khichi aur unke mandal ke kavi; Manas Ke Moti

Mahendra Pratap Singh (19 January 1930 – 10 December 2022) was an Indian Hindi author, historian and researcher. He wrote and published books in history, Hindi literature, and poetry.

== Early life ==
Singh was the eldest son of Thakur Harpal Singh and Shiv Rani Devi. He was born in Arki, near Rajapur, in Chitrakoot District. Rajapur was the birthplace of Tulsidas, who became a major influence in his life. He lost his mother when he was 2. His father worked for the police. Singh's primary education was mostly in Orai, while living in a hostel.

He pursued higher education at Kanpur, where his inclination towards poetry and writing grew. He moved to Baroda to pursue his PhD.

== Career ==
He started his career as an editor of Gyan Bharti magazine. He later joined Desbandhu College of Delhi University as Lecturer.

He was an executive committee member of Friends at Archives (National Archives Of India). He served as reader in the Hindi Department of Deshbandhu College, under Delhi University where he retired in 1992. He suffered a brain hemorrhage that partially paralyzed him, limiting his further contributions.

== Recognition ==
He was awarded Acharya Narendra Dev Puraskar for his book Etihasik Pramanavali aur Chattrasal by the Government of Uttar Pradesh in 1978.

== Works ==
- Bhagavantarāya Khīcī aura unake maṇḍala ke kavi (भगवंतराय खींची और उनके मंडल के कवी - इतिहास एवं साहित्य में शोध कार्य)
- Aitihāsika pramāṇāvalī aura Chatrasāla (ऐतिहासिक प्रमाणावली और छत्रसाल - इतिहास एवं साहित्य में शोध कार्य)
- Rītikālīna Hindī sāhitya kī aitihāsika vyākhyā (रीतिकालीन हिंदी साहित्य की ऐतिहासिक व्याख्या - साहित्य) )
- Chatraprakāsa (छत्रप्रकाश, लाल कवी कृत: सम्पादित ग्रन्थ)
- Shivaji, Bhakha Sources and Nationalism
- "Jagatraj Digvijay (जगतराज दिग्विजय, हरिकेश कवी कृत: सम्पादित ग्रन्थ)". Exotic India Art.
- "Jaisingh Vinod (जयसिंह विनोद, देव कवी कृत: सम्पादित ग्रन्थ)". Exotic India Art.
- "Dayanand ka Swapna Darshan (दयानन्द का स्वप्न दर्शन - कविता)". Exotic India Art.
- Manas Ke Moti (मानस के मोती - धर्म/दर्शन, रामचरितमानस पर आधारित)
- Kiran (किरण - कविता)

== Sources ==
- Who's who in India , p. 449, at Google Books
- Indian Author , p. 75, at Google Books
- Hindī sāhityakāra sandarbha kośa (हिंदी सहित्यकार सन्दर्भ कोष) , p. 280, at Google Books
- Śodha sandarbha: Hindī meṃ san 1979 taka svīkr̥ta śodhaprabandhoṃ kī sandarbhikā (शोध संदर्भ : हिंदी में सं 1979 तक स्वीकृत शोधप्रबंधों की संदर्भिका ) , p. 501, at Google Books
