= Bindki =

- Town
- Location in Uttar Pradesh, India
- Coordinates: 26.03°N 80.6°E
- Country: India
- State: Uttar Pradesh
- District: Fatehpur
- Named for: Raja Venuki
- Assembly Constituency: Bindki

Government
  - Type: Municipality
  - Body: Nagar Palika Parishad (NPP) Bindki
  - Chairman: Radha Sahu (BJP)
  - MLA: Jai Kumar Singh Jaiki (AD(S))
  - SDM: Anju
- Elevation: 125 m (410 ft)

Population (2011)
  - Total: 36,926

Languages
  - Official: Hindi and Urdu
- Time zone: UTC+5:30 (IST)
- PIN: 212635
- Area code: 05181
- Vehicle registration: UP-71

Bindki is a city, sub-district and a municipality in Fatehpur district in the state of Uttar Pradesh, India.

It is one of the few Indian towns which has separate markets for different commodities. The markets are Bajaja Gali for clothes, Sarafa Bajar for jewellery, Bartan Bajar for utensils, Kirana Gali for spices, Shoe market for footwears, Fatak Bajar for stationery and books, Najahi Gali for food grains, Ghihai Gali for ghee, etc. Bindki is an assembly constituency and Jaiki Patel from AD(S) is the present MLA. Dayanand Inter College, Nagar Palika Nehru Inter College and Sohan Lal Dwivedi Government Girls Inter College are various inter colleges in this town. 'Bindki Road' is the nearest railway station on Delhi Howrah route, 10 km (6.2 mi) away from Bindki.

== History ==
6 km from Bindki, stands the memorial site of Bawani Imli massacre, wherein on 28 April 1858, 52 Indian freedom fighters, including Thakur Jodha Singh Ataiya, were executed by hanging from a tamrind tree, by the British colonial army.

== Geography ==
Bindki is located at 26.03°N 80.6°E. It is about 30 km (19 mi) from Fatehpur, 55 km (34 mi) from Kanpur, 72 km (45 mi) from Banda and 127 km (79 mi) from Lucknow. It has an average elevation of 125 metres (410 ft).

Bindki and its environs have rich and fertile regions, lying in between the Ganga and Yamuna rivers. Rice is the main crop of Bindki tehsil. Nearby Chaudgra is the main industrial area.

== Demographics ==
According to 2011 Census of India, Bindki Tehsil had a population of 7,49,645 out of which 3,95,334 are males while 3,54,311 are females. The average literacy rate was 71.78% out of which male literacy was 69.47% and female literacy was 53.05%. The sex ratio was 896.

Bindki Tehsil consists of 2 urban areas with urban population of 63,285 in which Bindki City had a population of 36,926 out of which males were 19,562 and females were 17,364 with the literacy rate of 77.60 per cent and Kora Jahanabad Town had a population of 26,359 with 72.44% literacy however still in Bindki no commerce colleges available. The educational institutions in Bindki are dealing with science and arts faculties only.

Bindki Tehsil consists of 424 villages which combines a total rural population of 6,86,360 with 71.43% literacy rate.

Religions in Bindki Tehsil
| Religion | Percent |
| Hinduism | 87.95% |
| Muslim | 11.8% |
| Sikhism | 0.01% |
| Jainism | 0.01% |
| Christians | 0.07% |
| Others† | 0.15% |

== Notable people ==
- Sohan Lal Dwivedi,(1906-1988) Rashtrakavi (national Hindi poet)
