= 1977 Indian general election =

- 16–20 March 1977

542 of the 544 seats in the Lok Sabha (Note: Two seats were reserved for Anglo-Indians and filled by presidential nomination) 272 seats needed for a majority
- Registered: 321,174,327
- Turnout: 60.49% (▲5.22pp)
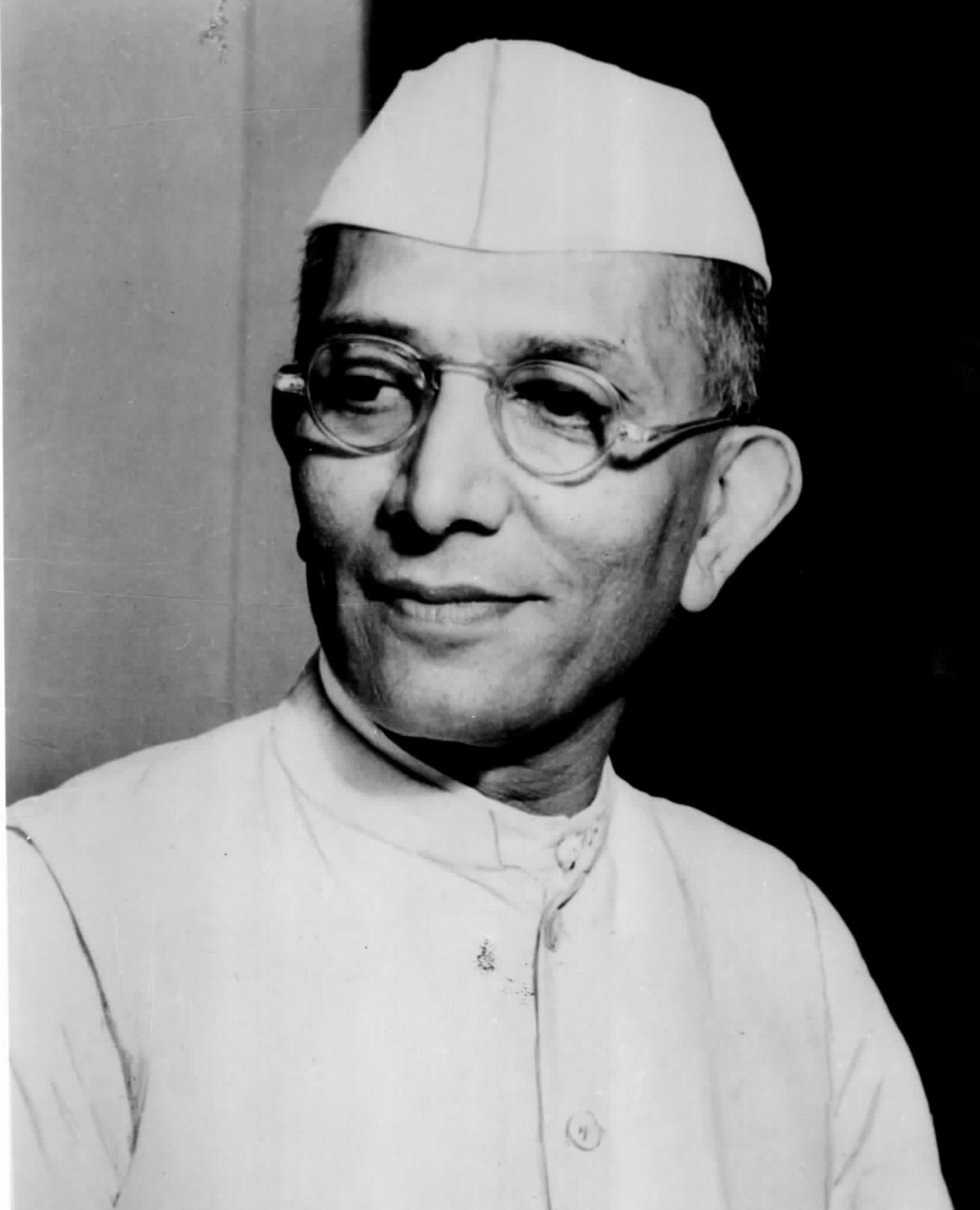

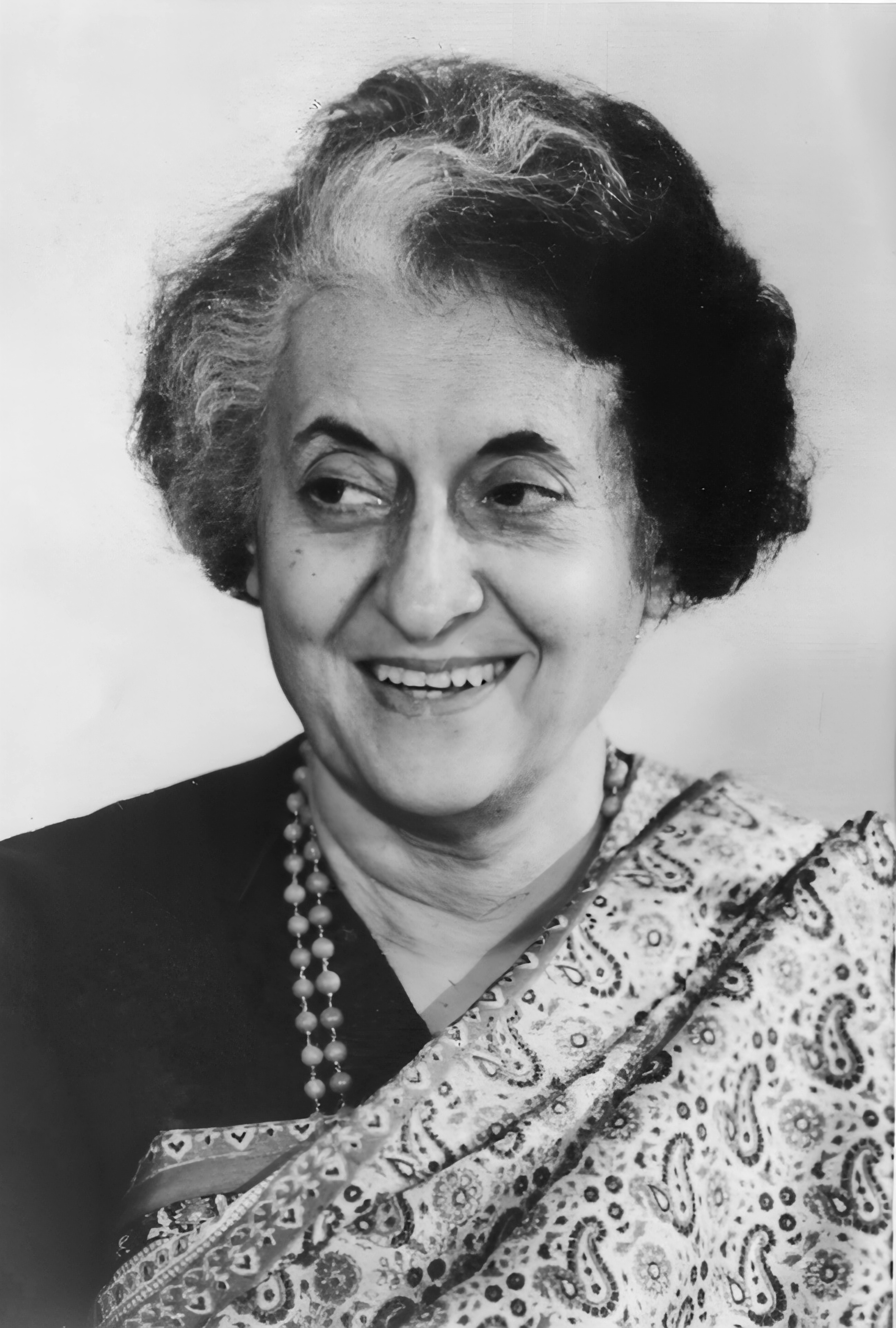

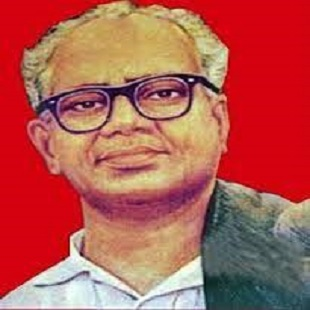
	First party	Second party	Third party
Leader	Morarji Desai	Indira Gandhi	Puchalapalli Sundarayya
Party	JP (Note: The Janata Party was a broad electoral alliance whose constituent parties maintained their organization. Desai was a member, and the leader of, the INC(O))	INC(R)	CPI(M)
Alliance	JP+LF	INC (R)+	JP+LF
Last election	20.33%, 51 seats	43.68%, 352 seats	5.12%, 25 seats
Seats won	298	154	22
Seat change	▲212	▼198	▼3
Popular vote	81,386,148	65,211,589	8,113,659
Percentage	43.04%	34.52%	4.29%
Swing	▲20.99pp	▼9.16pp	▼0.83pp
- Results by constituency
Prime Minister before election
Indira Gandhi
INC(R)
Prime Minister after election
Morarji Desai
JP

General elections were held in India between 16 and 20 March 1977 to elect the members of the sixth Lok Sabha. The elections took place during the Emergency period, which expired on 21 March 1977, shortly before the final results were announced.

The elections resulted in a heavy defeat for the Indian National Congress (R), with the incumbent Prime Minister and INC(R) party leader Indira Gandhi losing her seat in Rae Bareli, while her son Sanjay lost his seat in Amethi. Morarji Desai of the Janata Party took office as the first non-Congress Prime Minister on 24 March. The call for restoration of democracy by revoking the Emergency is considered to be a major reason for the sweeping victory for the opposition Janata Alliance, At 81, Desai became the oldest man to be elected Prime Minister of India.

== Background ==
A total of 542 members were elected from single-member constituencies. These 542 constituencies remained same until 2004 Indian general elections for the 14th Lok Sabha.

The Emergency declared by the Indira Gandhi led Congress(R) government was the core issue in the 1977 elections. Civil liberties were suspended during the national emergency from 25 June 1975 to 21 March 1977 and Prime Minister Indira Gandhi assumed vast powers.

Gandhi had become unpopular for her decision and paid for it during the elections. On 18 January, Gandhi called for fresh elections and released some political prisoners. Many remained in prison until she was ousted from office and a new prime minister took over. On 20 January, four opposition parties, the Indian National Congress (Organisation), the Bharatiya Jana Sangh, the Bharatiya Lok Dal and the Praja Socialist Party, decided to fight the elections under a single banner called the Janata alliance. The alliance used the symbol allocated to Bhartiya Lok Dal as their symbol on the ballot papers.

The Janata Alliance reminded voters of the excesses and human rights violations during the Emergency, like compulsory sterilisation and imprisonment of political leaders. The Janata campaign said the elections would decide whether India would have "democracy or dictatorship." The Congress(R) looked jittery. Agriculture and Irrigation Minister Babu Jagjivan Ram quit the party in the first week of February; other notable Congress(R) stalwarts who crossed the floor with Jagjivan Ram before the election were Hemvati Nandan Bahuguna and Nandini Satpathy.

== Results ==
The elections in India's largest state Uttar Pradesh, historically a Congress(R) stronghold, turned against Gandhi. Dhanagare says the structural reasons included the emergence of a strong and united opposition, disunity and weariness within the Congress(R), an effective opposition and the failure of Gandhi in controlling the mass media, which was under censorship during the Emergency. The structural factors allowed voters to express their grievances, notably their resentment of the emergency and its authoritarian and repressive policies. One grievance often mentioned was the 'Nasbandi' (vasectomy) campaign in rural areas. The middle class also emphasised on the curbing of freedom of speech throughout the country.

Meanwhile, Congress(R) hit an all-time low in West Bengal, according to the Gangulys, because of the state-sponsored anti-Communist violence against the cadres of CPI(M) & Naxalites by the government of Siddhartha Shankar Ray, whose legitimacy was questionable, poor discipline and factionalism among Congress(R) activists as well as numerous defections that weakened the party. Opponents emphasised the issues of corruption within the Congress(R) and appealed to a deep desire by the voters for fresh leadership. The Congress(R), however, did well in southern states of Tamil Nadu, Karnataka, Kerala and Andhra Pradesh. The results were mixed in the western states of Maharashtra and Gujarat, although the Janata alliance won all the seats in Mumbai.

Party	Votes	%	Seats	+/–
Janata Party	78,062,828	41.32	295	+209
Indian National Congress (R)	65,211,589	34.52	154	–198
Communist Party of India (Marxist)	8,113,659	4.29	22	–3
All India Anna Dravida Munnetra Kazhagam	5,480,378	2.90	18	New
Communist Party of India	5,322,088	2.82	7	–16
Dravida Munnetra Kazhagam	3,323,320	1.76	2	–21
Indian National Congress (Organisation)	3,252,217	1.72	3	–13
Shiromani Akali Dal	2,373,331	1.26	9	+8
Peasants and Workers Party of India	1,030,232	0.55	5	+5
Republican Party of India (Khobragade)	956,072	0.51	2	+2
Revolutionary Socialist Party	851,164	0.45	4	+1
All India Forward Bloc	633,644	0.34	3	+1
Indian Union Muslim League	565,007	0.30	2	0
Kerala Congress (Pillai Group)	526,937	0.28	0	New
Kerala Congress	491,674	0.26	2	–1
Jammu & Kashmir National Conference	483,192	0.26	2	New
Muslim League (Opposition)	318,979	0.17	0	New
Socialist Unity Centre of India	280,995	0.15	0	0
Vishal Haryana Party	192,867	0.10	0	–1
Republican Party of India	155,972	0.08	0	–1
All India Jharkhand Party	126,288	0.07	1	0
United Democratic Front	124,627	0.07	1	New
Maharashtrawadi Gomantak Party	118,748	0.06	1	+1
Jharkhand Party	116,961	0.06	0	New
Manipur Peoples Party	109,130	0.06	0	0
Shoshit Samaj Dal (Akhil Baharatiya)	96,753	0.05	0	New
Revolutionary Communist Party of India	45,047	0.02	0	0
Tripura Upajati Juba Samiti	35,916	0.02	0	New
Hindu Mahasabha	35,419	0.02	0	0
Bihar Prant Hul Jharkhand	27,116	0.01	0	0
Akhil Bharatiya Ram Rajya Parishad	26,169	0.01	0	0
All India Labour Party	17,191	0.01	0	New
Akhil Bharatiya Gorkha League	12,509	0.01	0	0
All India Shiromani Baba Jivan Singh Mazabhi Dal	5,868	0.00	0	New
Independents	10,393,617	5.50	9	–5
Appointed Anglo-Indians			2	0
Total	188,917,504	100.00	544	+23
Valid votes	188,917,504	97.25		
Invalid/blank votes	5,346,411	2.75		
Total votes	194,263,915	100.00		
Registered voters/turnout	321,174,327	60.49		
Source: ECI

=== Results by state/union territory ===
State/Union territory	Seats				
State/Union territory	Seats	JNP	INC	Left	OTH
Andhra Pradesh	42	1	41	—N/a	—N/a
Arunachal Pradesh	2	—N/a	1	—N/a	1
Assam	14	3	10	—N/a	1
Bihar	54	52	—N/a	—N/a	2
Goa, Daman and Diu	2	—N/a	1	—N/a	1
Gujarat	26	16	10	—N/a	—N/a
Haryana	10	10	—N/a	—N/a	—N/a
Himachal Pradesh	4	4	—N/a	—N/a	—N/a
Jammu and Kashmir	6	—N/a	3	—N/a	3
Karnataka	28	2	26	—N/a	—N/a
Kerala	20	—N/a	11	5	4
Madhya Pradesh	40	37	1	—N/a	2
Maharashtra	48	19	20	3	6
Manipur	2	—N/a	2	—N/a	—N/a
Meghalaya	2	—N/a	1	—N/a	1
Mizoram	1	—N/a	—N/a	—N/a	1
Nagaland	1	—N/a	—N/a	—N/a	1
Orissa	21	15	4	1	1
Punjab	13	3	—N/a	1	9
Rajasthan	25	24	1	—N/a	—N/a
Sikkim	1	—N/a	1	—N/a	—N/a
Tamil Nadu	39	—N/a	14	3	22
Tripura	2	1	1	—N/a	—N/a
Uttar Pradesh	85	85	—N/a	—N/a	—N/a
West Bengal	42	15	3	23	1
Andaman and Nicobar	1	—N/a	1	—N/a	—N/a
Chandigarh	1	1	—N/a	—N/a	—N/a
Dadra and Nagar Haveli	1	—N/a	1	—N/a	—N/a
Delhi	7	7	—N/a	—N/a	—N/a
Lakshadweep	1	—N/a	1	—N/a	—N/a
Pondicherry	1	—N/a	—N/a	—N/a	1
Total	542	295	154	36	57

Notes:

- The results for presented above are party-wise, not alliance-wise.
- Party abbreviations:
  - JNP – Janata Party
  - INC(R) – Indian National Congress (R)
  - LFT – Left Front (comprising CPI(M), CPI, RSP, and AIFB)
  - OTH – Others (includes parties and independents not belonging to any of the above groups)

Because the constituent parties merged under a single banner before polling, the Election Commission of India officially recorded 295 seats under the Bharatiya Lok Dal (BLD) symbol and 3 seats under the Congress (O) symbol (in Tamil Nadu).

Political historians and parliamentary records track the constituent-wise strength of those 298 MPs as follows:

Constituent Party / Faction	Key Leaders	Approximate Lok Sabha Seats
Bharatiya Jana Sangh (BJS)	Atal Bihari Vajpayee, L.K. Advani	93
Bharatiya Lok Dal (BLD)	Charan Singh, Raj Narain, Biju Patnaik	68
Indian National Congress (Organisation)	Morarji Desai, Asoka Mehta	55 (includes 3 won on NCO symbol in Tamil Nadu)
Socialist Party	George Fernandes, Madhu Limaye	51
Congress for Democracy (CFD)	Jagjivan Ram, H.N. Bahuguna	28 (contested as a close ally, formally merged in May 1977)
Rebel Congressmen / Independents	Chandra Shekhar, Mohan Dharia	3
Total		298

== Lok Sabha by-elections ==
#	Year	Constituency	State/UT	Previous MP		Reason	Elected MP	
1	1978	Nandyal	Andhra Pradesh	Neelam Sanjiva Reddy	Janata Party	Resigned	Pendekanti Venkatasubbaiah	Indian National Congress
2	1978	Warangal	Andhra Pradesh	S. B. Giri	Indian National Congress	Death	G. M. Rao	Indian National Congress
3	1978	Samastipur	Bihar	Karpoori Thakur	Janata Party	Resigned	Ajit Kumar Mehta	Janata Party
4	1978	Karnal	Haryana	B. D. Sharma	Janata Party	Resigned	M. Singh	Janata Party
5	1978	Chikmagalur	Karnataka	D. B. Chandregowda	Indian National Congress	Resigned	Indira Gandhi	Indian National Congress
6	1978	Outer Manipur	Manipur	Yangmaso Shaiza	Indian National Congress	Resigned	Kaiho	Janata Party
7	1978	Azamgarh	Uttar Pradesh	Ram Naresh Yadav	Janata Party	Declared Void	Mohsina Kidwai	Indian National Congress
8	1978	Fatehpur	Uttar Pradesh	Bashir Ahmed	Janata Party	Death	Liaquat Husain	Janata Party
9	1979	Secunderabad	Andhra Pradesh	M. M. Hashim	Indian National Congress	Resigned	P. Shiv Shankar	Indian National Congress
10	1979	Siddipet	Andhra Pradesh	Gaddam Venkatswamy	Indian National Congress	Resigned	Nandi Yellaiah	Indian National Congress
11	1979	Sidhi	Madhya Pradesh	Surya Narayan Singh	Janata Party	Death	R. N. Singh	Janata Party
12	1979	Khandwa	Madhya Pradesh	Parmanand Govindjiwala	Janata Party	Death	Kushabhau Thakre	Janata Party

== Aftermath ==
It was not clear if Indira would accept the election results. Although she publicly claimed she would "abide" by the results, behind the scenes, she fired Military Intelligence Head Mani Mishra in favour of loyalist Kashmiri Hardayal Kaul. The INC(R) and senior military officers held several meetings in New Delhi, raising suspicions. Chief of the Army Staff T.N. Raina (who had only been appointed because Indira had superseded senior officers to appoint him) was invited for a discussion by Indira and Sanjay Gandhi. Sanjay reportedly told Raina "There are about 300 districts in the country. One infantry platoon is sufficient to control each district... Thus we can control India by deploying 300 platoons or about 25 infantry battalions; a mere three or four divisions. The party [the Congress], supported by paramilitary forces and the police, can deal with other administrative details." Although Indira agreed with Sanjay's plan, Raina refused to follow the plan, despite noting Sanjay's assumptions were "mathematically correct".

== See also ==
- List of members of the 6th Lok Sabha
- 1977 Indian general election by state or union territory
