= Amar Shaheed Jodha Singh Attaiya Thakur Dariyao Singh Medical College, Fatehpur =

Education organization in Fatehpur, India

- Other names: Government Medical College, Fatehpur
- Type: Medical College and Hospital
- Established: 2021; 5 years ago
- Affiliations: Atal Bihari Vajpayee Medical University
- Principal: Dr. R. P. Singh
- Location: Fatehpur, Uttar Pradesh, India; 25.9843°N 80.7589°E
- Campus: Rural
- Website: asmcfatehpur.com

Amar Shaheed Jodha Singh Attaiya Thakur Dariyao Singh Medical College, Fatehpur, also known as Autonomous State Medical College, Fatehpur, is a full-fledged tertiary government Medical college and hospital. It is located at Fatehpur in Uttar Pradesh, India. The college imparts the degree of Bachelor of Medicine and Surgery (MBBS). The yearly undergraduate student intake is 100. It is Spread over approximately 19 acres area.

== Courses ==
This medical college undertakes the education and training of 100 students in MBBS courses along with paramedical batches

== Affiliated ==
The college is affiliated with Atal Bihari Vajpayee Medical University and is recognized by the National Medical Commission.

== See also ==
- Bawani Imli massacre
