= Ayah Shah Assembly constituency =

Constituency of the Uttar Pradesh legislative assembly in India

Coordinates: 25.81°N 81.19°E

Ayah Shah
- Constituency No. 241 for the Uttar Pradesh Legislative Assembly

Constituency details
- Country: India
- Region: North India
- State: Uttar Pradesh
- District: Fatehpur
- Total electors: 2,74,485 (2022)
- Reservation: None

Member of Legislative Assembly
- 18th Uttar Pradesh Legislative Assembly
- Incumbent Vikas Gupta
- Party: Bharatiya Janata Party
- Elected year: 2022

Ayah Shah is a constituency of the Uttar Pradesh Legislative Assembly covering the city of Ayah Shah in the Fatehpur district of Uttar Pradesh, India.

Ayah Shah is one of six assembly constituencies in the Fatehpur Lok Sabha constituency. Since 2008, this assembly constituency is numbered 241 amongst 403 constituencies.

== Members of the Legislative Assembly ==
Election	Name	Party
2012	Ayodhya Prasad Pal	Bahujan Samaj Party
2017	Vikas Gupta	Bharatiya Janata Party
2022	Vikas Gupta	Bharatiya Janata Party

== Election results ==
=== 2027 ===
2027 Uttar Pradesh Legislative Assembly election: Ayay Shah
Party	Candidate	Votes	%	±%
INDIA				
NDA				
BSP				
NOTA	None of the above			
Majority				
Turnout				
gain from		Swing		

=== 2022 ===
2022 Uttar Pradesh Legislative Assembly election: Ayah Shah
Party	Candidate	Votes	%	±%
BJP	Vikas Gupta	71,231	44.4	▼9.4
SP	Vishambhar Prasad Nishad	58,225	36.3	▲16.93
BSP	Chandan Singh	22,045	13.74	▼4.39
INC	Hemlata	1,753	1.09	
CPI	Sushil Singh Patel	1,605	1.0	
NOTA	None of the above	1,884	1.17	▲0.1
Majority		13,006	8.1	▼26.33
Turnout		160,419	58.44	▲0.5
BJP hold		Swing		

=== 2017 ===
2017 Uttar Pradesh Legislative Assembly election: Ayah Shah
Party	Candidate	Votes	%	±%
BJP	Vikas Gupta	81,203	53.8	
SP	Ayodhya Prasad Pal	29,238	19.37	
BSP	Rambahadur	27,365	18.13	
PECP	Abbas Mehndi	2,159	1.43	
RLD	Dev Kumar	1,708	1.13	
Independent	Sukhraj	1,691	1.12	
Independent	Hemlata	1,526	1.01	
NOTA	None of the above	1,600	1.07	
Majority		51,965	34.43	
Turnout		150,934	57.94	
