= Bhadiyapur =

Coordinates: 25°33′11″N 81°11′09″E

Bhadiyapur is a village in Fatehpur district, Uttar Pradesh, India. The Yamuna River is 5 km south.
