= Shahpur, Fatehpur district =

Shahpur
- Village
- Location in Uttar Pradesh, India
- Coordinates: 25.8465805°N 81.1513191°E
- Country: India
- State: Uttar Pradesh
- District: Fatehpur

Government
  - Type: Panchayati raj

Area
  - Total: 168.08 km^{2} (64.90 sq mi)

Population (2011)
  - Total: 2,676
  - Density: 15.92/km^{2} (41.24/sq mi)

Languages
  - Official: Hindi
- Time zone: UTC+5:30 (IST)
- PIN: 212652

Shahpur is a village in Fatehpur district of the Indian state of Uttar Pradesh. It is located in Fatehpur taluk of Fatehpur division.

== Geography ==
Shahpur is located at 25.8465805°N 81.1513191°E. The village is spread over an area of 168.08 km^{2} (64.90 sq mi).

== Demographics ==
As of 2011 census, Shahpur had a population of 2,676 with 434 households. The total population constitute, 1,390 males and 1,286 females —a sex ratio of 925 females per 1000 males. 396 children are in the a ge group of 0–6 years, of which 224 are boys and 172 are girls. The average literacy rate stands at 67.90% with 1,548 literates.
