= Parvezpur =

Village in Uttar Pradesh, India

Coordinates: 25°30′37″N 81°08′40″E

Parvezpur is a village in the Fatehpur district of Uttar Pradesh, India. Located on the banks of the Yamuna River, it falls in Khakhreru Thana, Khaga. The nearest village and post office is Adhaiya. This village is one of the villages of 12 purwa of KHOKHARS.
