= Kora Jahanabad =

Kora Jahanabad Jahanabad
- Town
- Location in Uttar Pradesh, India
- Coordinates: 26°06′N 80°21′E
- Country: India
- State: Uttar Pradesh
- District: Fatehpur
- Assembly Constituency: Jahanabad

Government
  - Type: Municipality
  - Body: Nagar Panchayat (NP) Kora Jahanabad
  - MLA: Jai Kumar Singh Jaiki (Apna Dal (Sonelal))

Area
  - Total: 3.25 km^{2} (1.25 sq mi)
- Elevation: 112 m (367 ft)

Population (2011)
  - Total: 45,410
  - Density: 14,000/km^{2} (36,200/sq mi)

Hindi, Urdu
  - Official: Hindi
- Time zone: UTC+5:30 (IST)
- PIN: 212659
- Vehicle registration: UP 71 xxxx

Religions in Kora Jahanabad Town
Religion	Percent
Muslim	50.15%
Hindus	49.5%
Jainism	0.15%
Christians	0.17%
Others†	0.02%

Kora Jahanabad is a town in Fatehpur district in the Indian state of Uttar Pradesh. It is located on Kora Road, about 6 km east of Jahanabad, about 43 km south of Kanpur, about 78 km west by northwest of Fatehpur, and 480 km southeast of Delhi. Local people also call it "Jahanabad".

== Economy ==
It has two wheeler showrooms and service centres, cooperative banks, ATMs and many bank branches such as:

- Uttar Pradesh Gramin Bank
- State Bank of India
- Bank of Baroda
- Central Bank of India

It has a big power house, water tanks and petrol pumps and a post office is also situated in the town. Uttar Pradesh State Road Transport Corporation buses ply to Kanpur every 45 minutes from the local bus stand which is also connected to Fatehpur, Kidwainagar Auraiya, Etawah, Lucknow, Delhi.

== Demographics ==
As of 2011 India census, Kora Jahanabad had a population of 26,359 comprising 13,898 males and 12,461 females. The literacy rate was 72.44%, lower than the national average of 74.04%: male literacy is 78.32%, and female literacy is 65.93%. The sex ratio was 897 women per 1000 men. Also as per the census, the child sex ratio was 864.

== Politics ==
Kora Jahanabad is administered by a nagar panchayat (a type of municipal body). Currently, Rabiya Khatoon is the chairperson of the nagar panchayat.

== Academics ==
The town consists of many government and private educational institutes. Some of them are:

- Shri Addya Saran Singh Adarsh Inter College
- Shishu Gyan Vanasthaly, near Ram Talai Mandir
- Gandhi Inter College
- Vikas Vidya Mandir
- National High School
- Dilip Kumar Smarak Mahavidyalay
- Vivekanand Vikas Sansthan
- Children Public School
- Children Haven School, Baradari
- Gyandeep School
- Royal Guest House & Schools
- Bhola Nath Uttam Degree College
- Maujilal Mahavidyalaya
- Saraswati Shishu Mandir
- Saraswati Vidya Mandir
- Government Balika Vidyalaya
- Kanya Vidya Pathshala
- Jabariya School
- Dayanand Saraswati School
- Shahid Malta Sports School
- Madarsa
- Sanskrit Pathshala (closed 1998)

== Hospitals ==
- Samudaik Swasthya Kendra in Garhi Kora
- Private Hospital on the Mughal Road
- S. J. Hospital & Diagnostics
- Surya Hospital
- Rajkiya Homeopathic Hospital

== Points of interest ==
It home to the famous Hindu temple (mandir) Ram Janaki Dham or Ram Talai Mandir. Annual events such as a dangal competition (a pehlwani competition) are also held in the temple akhara premises. It also has an Arya Samaj temple, a Hindu temple dedicated to Ambika and two historical mosques — the Bijli Khan Masjid and the Qutubuddin Badh Masjid — as well as a famous Shirin of Shah Jamal Aulia.

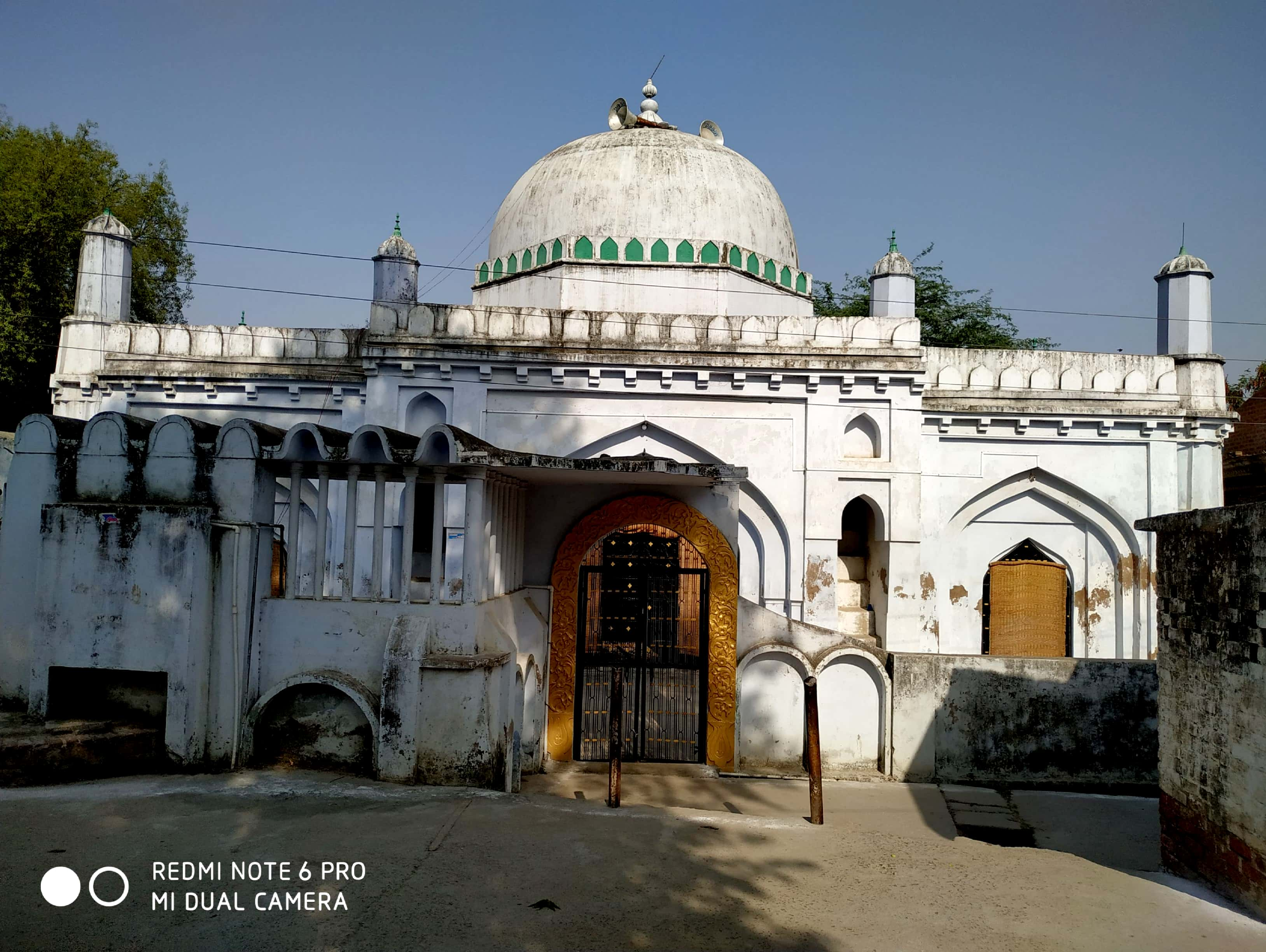

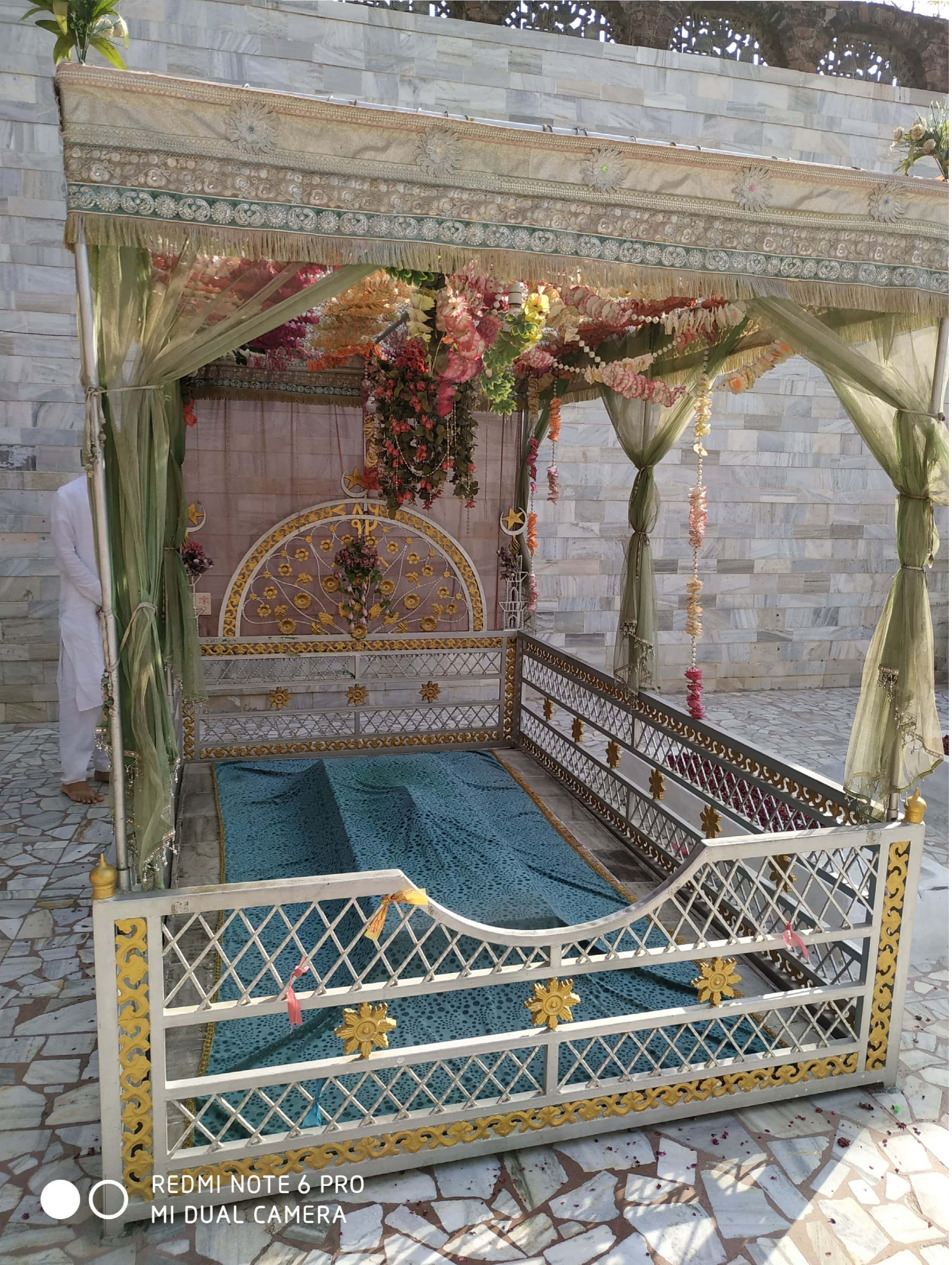
