= Uttar Pradesh Sodic Land Reclamation III Project =

Land reclamation project in India

Uttar Pradesh Sodic Land Reclamation III Project (UPSLR IIIP) is a land reclamation project in India, designed to reclaim 1,30,000 ha sodic lands in 28 sodic infested districts of the State of Uttar Pradesh. A pilot, to reclaim 5000 ha ravine land in two districts, Fatehpur and Kanpur Dehat, is also envisaged in the project.

A large number of the sodic lands holders are from the most deprived and poorest section of the community and lack basic amenities. The project is developed to bring significant agriculture and socio-economic development in the project area. The project includes all the activities which are essential in a farming system approach for favorable changes in overall farm income.

== Objectives ==
The main objective is reversal of land degradation to achieve greater agricultural productivity by enhancement of soil fertility and improved provision of agricultural support services for farmers making a living on selected degraded agricultural land.

Three key indicators of performance have been identified: increase in productivity of rice and wheat, diversification in agriculture production, and increase in farm income.

The expected results are: improved soil quality, increased productivity, and higher cropping intensity.

== Components ==
The project has five components, four are technical, and the last pertains to the management of the project:

- On-Farm Development and Land Treatment
- Improvement of Drainage Systems
- Agriculture Support System
- Institutional Strengthening for Improved Market Access
- Project Management

== District coverage ==
29 districts have been selected for the project. Azamgarh, Jaunpur district, Ghazipur, Sant Ravidas Nagar, Pratapgarh, Sultanpur district, Ambedkar Nagar district, Barabanki Lucknow, Unnao, Raebareli, Hardoi, Sitapur, Fatehpur district, Allahabad, Amethi, Kaushambi district, Kanpur Nagar, Kanpur Dehat, Etawah, Auraiya, Kannauj, Farrukhabad Aligarh, Bulandshahr district, Firozabad, Mainpuri, Etah and Kanshiram Nagar.
