= BKO =

BKO may refer to:

- Modibo Keita International Airport, in Mali (IATA airport code: BKO)
- The Belorussian Communist Organisation, a communist group in Belarus
- Brookwood railway station (three-letter station code)
- Bindki Road Railway station, in Uttar Pradesh, India (Indian Railways station code: BKO)
- Baten Kaitos Origins, an RPG for the Nintendo GameCube
- Keiichi Okabe, Japanese music composer also known as "BKO"
