= Liaquat Husain =

Indian politician

Syed Liaquat Husain was an Indian politician. He was linked to the Communist Party of India (Marxist). After the death of incumbent parliamentarian Bashir Ahmed He contested and won the December 5, 1978, by-election from the Fatehpur (standing as a Janata Party candidate). He represented the Fatehpur constituency in the Lok Sabha between 6 December 1978 and 22 August 1979. Liaquat Husian was elected to the Uttar Pradesh Legislative Assembly in 1990 and served as Minister of State for Industries in the Uttar Pradesh state government.

He died on November 9, 2002, in Mumbai.
