= Dosar Vaishya =

Vaishya community from India

Dosar, also known as Dhusar, is a Vaishya community in North India that originated in the Dhosi hill region near Rewari in the Indian state of Haryana. Written records as far back as 8th century, mention them and they are related to Dhusar Brahmins (sub-branch of Bhargavas) who earlier performed purohit duties but later took on the trading and business activities, leading to present-day sometimes-confused claims from both communities. The last Hindu ruler of Delhi Hemu, saint poet Sahajo Bai, and the publisher Munshi Nawal Kishore also belonged to the same community.

== History ==
=== Origin ===
The present-day Dhusar community traces its common origin to Dhosi Hill, a site associated with the vedic era Hindu sage Rishi Chyavana, which serves as the ancestral root for both present-day Dhusar Brahmins (Bhargavas) and Dhusar Vaishyas (Baniyas). This shared lineage is evidenced by historical accounts of the community performing both priestly (Purohit) and mercantile duties, leading to contemporary claims from both Brahmin and Vaishya groups.

=== 6th-9th century ===
They are mentioned in the Sakarari (old name of Sikar) inscription of Vikram Samvat 699 (642 CE) along with the Dharkata community. The Sakarari inscription, dated to VS 699 (AD 642-2), is a historical record that mentions the Dharkata community, which is associated with the early history of the Dosar Vaishya (or Dhusar) community.

They are mentioned in a Khandela (Sikar district) inscription of 807 CE.

=== Modern era ===
The author of the Jhanda Geet (विजयी विश्व तिरंगा प्यारा, झण्डा ऊँचा रहे हमारा), Shyam Lal Gupta was a Dosar.

== Celebrations ==
The present day "Matsya Utsav" of Alwar district begins from Machari village, as a cultural tribute to Samrat Hem Chandra Vikramaditya, who was born in the village in 1501, a Dosar Brahmin turned trader and kshatriya ruler.

Agrasen Jayanti, with main event at Agroha Dham, is celebrated by all Agrawals across the world.
