= Bindki Road railway station =

Railway station in Uttar Pradesh, India

Bindki Road Railway Station Bindki Road

General information
- Location: SH 46, Pahur Town, Bindki, Fatehpur, Uttar Pradesh; India
- Coordinates: 26°07′01″N 80°34′51″E
- System: Regular
- Owner: Railway Ministry of India
- Operator: North Central Railway
- Platforms: 3
- Tracks: 2

Construction
- Structure type: Standard (on ground station)
- Parking: Yes

Other information
- Station code: BKO
- Zone(s): North Central Railway
- Division(s): Prayagraj

History
- Closed: No
Location
- Location within India Location within Uttar Pradesh

Bindki Road railway station (station code BKO) is a small railway station located in SH 46, Pahur Town, Bindki, Fatehpur district in the Indian state of Uttar Pradesh.

== Trains ==
- Chauri-Chaura Express
- Kanpur Central - Chitrakoot Dham Intercity
- Prayagraj - Kanpur Central Passenger
- Fatehpur - Kanpur Central MEMU
- Udyan Abha Toofan Express
