= Sant Bux Singh =

Indian politician (1931–1992)

Member of Parliament, Lok Sabha
- In office 1967–1977
- Preceded by: Gauri Shanker Kakkar
- Succeeded by: Bashir Ahmad
- Constituency: Fatehpur, Uttar Pradesh

Personal details
- Born: 25 August 1931 Lucknow, United Provinces, British India (present-day Uttar Pradesh, India)
- Died: 15 January 1992 (aged 60) Allahabad, India
- Party: Indian National Congress
- Other political affiliations: Praja Socialist Party

Sant Bux Singh (25 August 1931 – 15 January 1992) was an Indian politician. He was a member of Parliamentrepresenting Fatehpur, Uttar Pradesh in the Lok Sabha, the lower house of India's Parliament as a member of the Indian National Congress.

Singh died in Allahabad on 15 January 1992, at the age of 60.
