= Bhagwant Rai Khichi =

Eighteenth century Rajput ruler known for resistance against Mughal Empire

Raja Bhagwant Rai Khichi
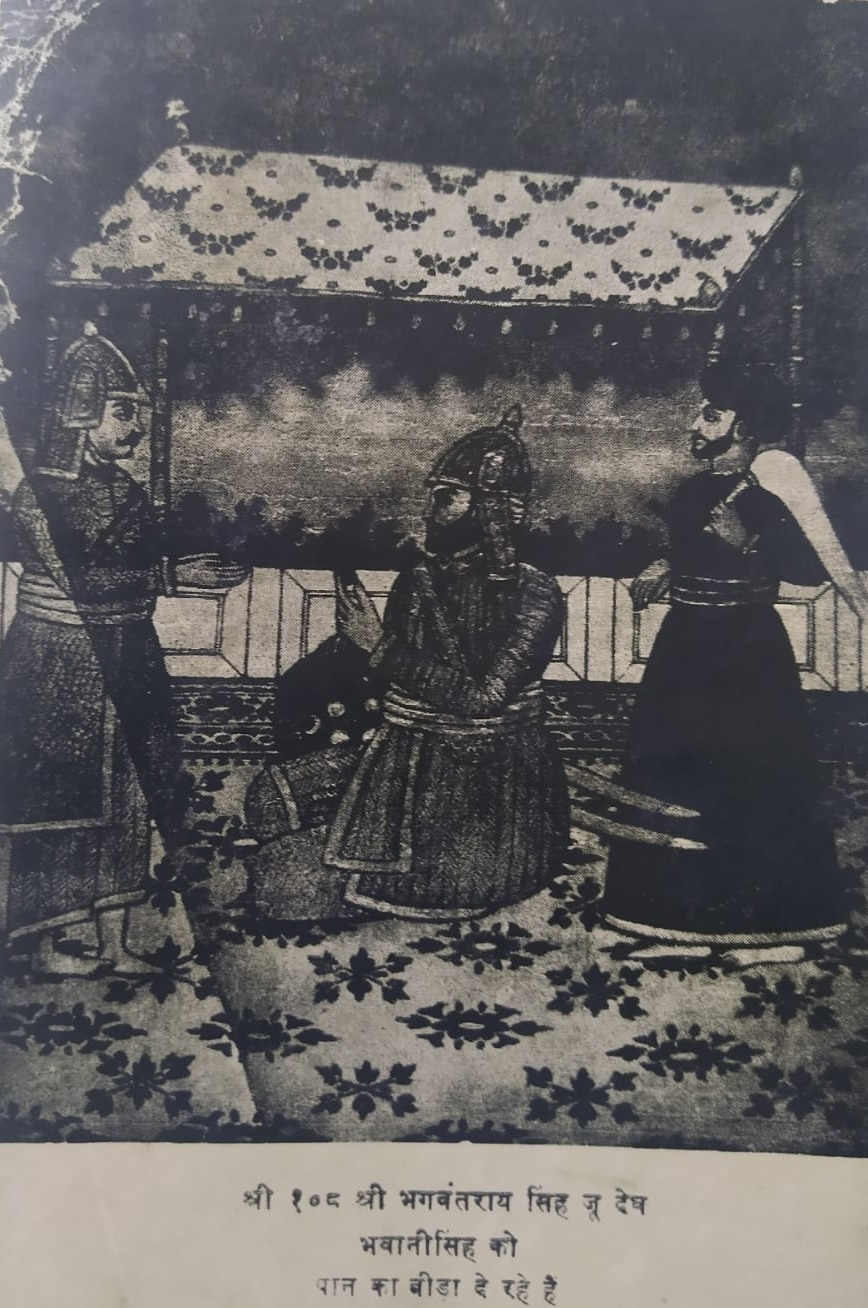
- Raja Bhagwant Rai Khichi with his Nephew Bhawani Singh
- Reign: 1710-1735
- Predecessor: Araru Singh
- Successor: Rup Singh

Bariar Singh

Raja Bhagwant Rai was an 18th-century Khichi Rajput ruler of Asothar and Ghazipur in the Fatehpur District of the Indian state of Uttar Pradesh. He is known for his resistance against the Mughal Empire and for establishing an independent state throughout his reign.

== Background ==
The Khichi family of Asothar is said to have been founded by Deogaj Singh a descendant of Achaldas Khichi of Gagron. In 1543 he came from Khichiwara, better known as Raghogarh, in the central India state of Madhya Pradesh, and married the daughter of the Gautam Raja of Aijhi on the banks of the River Yamuna. Deogaj subsequently ruled those lands. Raja Bhagwant Rai was the son of Araru Singh, Deogaj's descendant. A man of ability and courage, Raja Bhagwant Rai held an effectively independent state for many years. He defeated the Mughal troops until he was killed in 1735, owing to the treachery of Chaudhri Durjan Singh of Kora. He was succeeded by his son, Rup Singh, who held his possessions in peace till his death in 1780, when he was followed by Bariar Singh.

== Patron of literature ==
Raja Bhagwant Rai was a poet himself, who wrote poetry in chhand form and also composed Dhrupad music, one of his poetic work is said to be more than fifty chhands in praise of deity Hanuman Ji He was a patron of literature, collecting minor celebrities, such as Bhudhar of Asothar, Shimbhunath Misr, and Shiam Lal of Jahanabad.

== Conflict with Mughals ==
During the reign of Araru Singh and his son Bhagwant Rai, they rose to power and acquired a large estate, with headquarters at a new fort at Ghazipur district Fatehpur. It was then that the attention of the Mughal Government was attracted, when faujdar of Kara and Kora, Jan Nisar Khan, brother of the Wazir Qamr-ud-din, was killed by Khichar in 1734. A large army was brought from Delhi against Ghazipur and the fort was besieged, but Bhagwant Rai escaped and took refuge in Asothar. Eventually Qamr-ud-din abandoned the attempt and left Muhammad Khan Bangash to carry on the campaign, but Bhagwant Rai managed to get rid of him, it is said by a payment of money, and then recovered his power, getting the whole of Kora within his grasp. Bhagwant Rai attempted to further strengthen his position by calling in the aid of the Marathas & Maharaja Chhatrasal Bundela as well. In 1735 Saadat Ali Khan, the then Nawab of Awadh (Aoudh), took a large force against Ghazipur and a severe action ensued, the Khichar leader being at first successful defeating the significantly larger Army in a fierce Battle at Mudchaura near Ghazipur. It is said that after this battle, Bhagwant Rai and his nephew Bhawani Singh were killed by the treachery of Durjan Singh, Chaudhri of Kora.
