= Bawani Imli massacre =

1858 massacre

- Location: 6 km from Bindki Fatehpur district, Uttar Pradesh, India (30 km from Khajuha, Fatehpur district)
- Date: 28 April 1858
- Target: Indian rebels
- Attack type: Mass execution by hanging
- Weapon: Hanging
- Deaths: 52
- Perpetrator: East India Company

The Bawani Imli massacre (Hindi: बावनी इमली हत्याकांड) was the execution of 52 Indian freedom fighters including Thakur Jodha Singh Ataiya by British East India Company forces on 28 April 1858 during the Indian Rebellion of 1857. The executions took place on a tamarind tree, locally known as "Bawani Imli" (meaning "52 tamarind"), 6 km from Bindki tehsil, and located 30 km from the town of Khajuha in Fatehpur district, Uttar Pradesh, India. This event is considered a significant yet often overlooked episode in the Indian independence movement.

== Background ==
During the Indian Rebellion of 1857, also known as the First War of Indian Independence, various regions across India witnessed uprisings against British colonial rule. In Fatehpur district, Thakur Jodha Singh Ataiya, a zamindar from Rasulpur in Fatehpur district, was a prominent figure in the revolt. Inspired by contemporaries like Rani of Jhansi, Jodha Singh, alongside Deputy Collector Hikmat Ullah Khan, organised rebel activities, including the capture of the Fatehpur treasury and court. He also collaborated with leaders like Tatya Tope and engaged in guerrilla warfare against British forces, defeating Colonel Powell in battle. He was known for rallying thousands of peasants under his banner. He is remembered as a local hero who ignited the flame of revolt in the Awadh and Bundelkhand regions. However, following a betrayal by informants, Jodha Singh and 51 of his compatriots were captured by British forces near the village of Ghoora.

== Executions ==
On 28 April 1858, British forces arrested Thakur Jodha Singh and 51 of his fellow rebels after they were betrayed by local informations. All 52 men were executed by hanging from a large tamarind tree near Khajuha. The bodies were left hanging for several weeks after their execution, with the colonial authorities issuing strict orders forbidding their removal. According to reports, the tree was surrounded by 300 EIC soldiers to prevent any funerary rites. Colonial authorities warned the local population that anyone attempting to remove the bodies would face the same fate.

After 37 days, on the night of 3 June 1858, local leader Maharaja Bhawani Singh and his associates defied the orders, removed the bodies, and on June 4, 1858, conducted cremation rituals at Shivrajpur Ghat on the banks of the Ganges. Singh's removal of the bodies is remembered as an important moment of resistance.

== Legacy ==
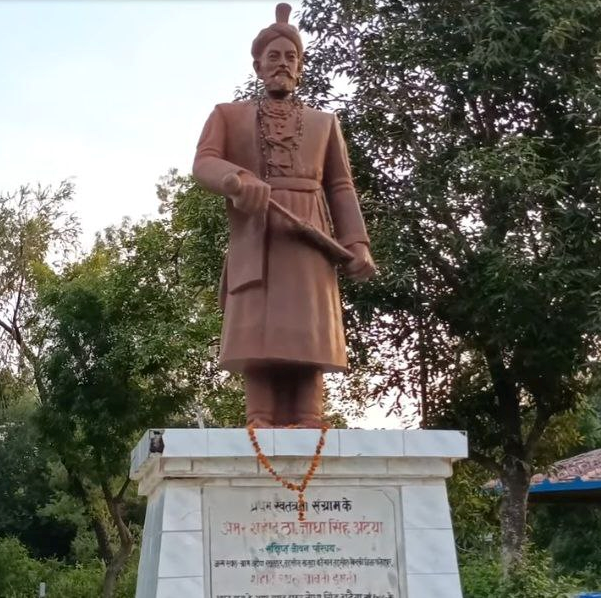
Statue of Jodha Singh Ataiya at Bawani Imli Memorial, Fatehpur

The tamarind tree, now known as "Bawani Imli," still stands as a living memorial to the executed men. Locals believe that the tree ceased to grow following the massacre, symbolising the gravity of the event. The site has been recognised as a place of historical significance, with a memorial established to honour all 52 men. Their names are inscribed on stone tablets at the site, ensuring that future generations remember their contributions. The site draws visitors annually on Independence Day and Republic Day.

== Commemoration ==
The Bawani Imli Memorial has been acknowledged by various governmental and non-governmental organisations for its historical importance. It serves as a reminder of the sacrifices made during India's struggle for independence. It is often referred to as the "second Jallianwala Bagh" due to the scale and brutality of the massacre.

In April 2025, a Hindi-language book documenting the massacre titled"Darakht: The Witness of Freedom Fighter," written by Vijay Narayan was released by local scholars and officials in Bindki.

== Bibliography ==
- Darakht: The Witness of Freedom Fighter (Hindi) by Vijay Narayan. Bluerose Publishers, 2025. ISBN 93-6261-492-8

== See also ==
- Fatehpur district
