= Naresh Uttam Patel =

Indian politician

Naresh Chandra Uttam Patel

Member of Parliament, Lok Sabha
- Incumbent
- Assumed office 4 June 2024
- Preceded by: Niranjan Jyoti
- Constituency: Fatehpur

State President of Samajwadi Party for Uttar Pradesh
- In office 1 January 2017 – 6 May 2024
- Preceded by: Shivpal Singh Yadav
- Succeeded by: Shyamlal Pal

Member (MLC) of Uttar Pradesh Legislative Council
- In office 6 May 2006 – 5 May 2024
- Constituency: elected by Legislative Assembly members

Member (MLA) of Uttar Pradesh Legislative Assembly
- In office 2 December 1989 – 4 April 1991
- Preceded by: Prakash Naraian
- Succeeded by: Chattra Pal Verma
- Constituency: Jahanabad

Deputy Minister Government of Uttar Pradesh
- In office 5 December 1989 – 24 June 1991
- Chief Minister: Mulayam Singh Yadav

Personal details
- Born: 10 January 1956 (age 70) Lahuri Sarai, Jahanabad, Fatehpur
- Party: Samajwadi Party (1992-present)
- Other political affiliations: Janata Dal (1989-1992)
- Education: P.P.N. Degree College, Kanpur University (BA, MA); D.A.V. Law College, Kanpur University (LL.B.)
- Profession: Politician

Naresh Uttam Patel (born 10 January 1956) is an Indian politician, leader of the Samajwadi Party and a former member of Uttar Pradesh Legislative Council. He first became an MLA as a Janata Dal candidate in 1989 and is one of the founding members of the Samajwadi Party. Currently, he is Uttar Pradesh State President of Samajwadi Party, second only to Chief Minister Akhilesh Yadav in the organisational setup in party state unit. With his clean image and educated background (post-graduate from Kanpur University, he has earned a reputation of grass-root leader with wider following among the dominant Kurmi caste voters, the community to which he himself belongs.

His elevation to such an important position indicates Party's new inclusive agenda that can help change image of the Party. He was the Minister in first Mulayam Government from 1989 to 1991 and three times Member of UP Legislative House. He was member of the Backward Class Commission and also member of the Janeshawar Mishra Trust. He was appointed Deputy State President when UP CM Akhilesh Yadav was Uttar Pradesh State President of Samajwadi Party, however when Shivpal Singh Yadav became UP State President of SP, he was removed. He belongs to Kurmi OBCs caste of UP and has been considered to be close to Mulayam Singh Yadav.

He is also one of the founding MLAs of Samajwadi Party. Being a loyalist of OBCs, he has been entrusted with the screening of candidates for the 2017 state elections.

Naresh Patel has won as MP in 2024 Loksabha elections from Fatehpur.
