= Chandra Prakash Lodhi =

Member of the Uttar Pradesh Legislative Assembly

Member of Uttar Pradesh Legislative Assembly
- Incumbent
- Assumed office March 2022
- Preceded by: Vikram Singh
- Constituency: Fatehpur

Personal details
- Born: 1 September 1966 (age 59) Fatehpur, Uttar Pradesh
- Party: Samajwadi Party
- Profession: Politician

Chandra Prakash Lodhi is an Indian politician and a member of the 18th Uttar Pradesh Assembly from the Fatehpur Assembly constituency of the Fatehpur district. He is a member of the Samajwadi Party.

== Early life ==
Chandra Prakash Lodhi was born on 1 September 1966 in Fatehpur, Uttar Pradesh, to a Hindu family of Krishna Dutt. He married Renu Verma, and they had four children.

== See also ==
- 18th Uttar Pradesh Assembly
- Fatehpur Assembly constituency
- Uttar Pradesh Legislative Assembly
