= Shyamlal Gupta =

Indian poet and lyricist (1896–1977)

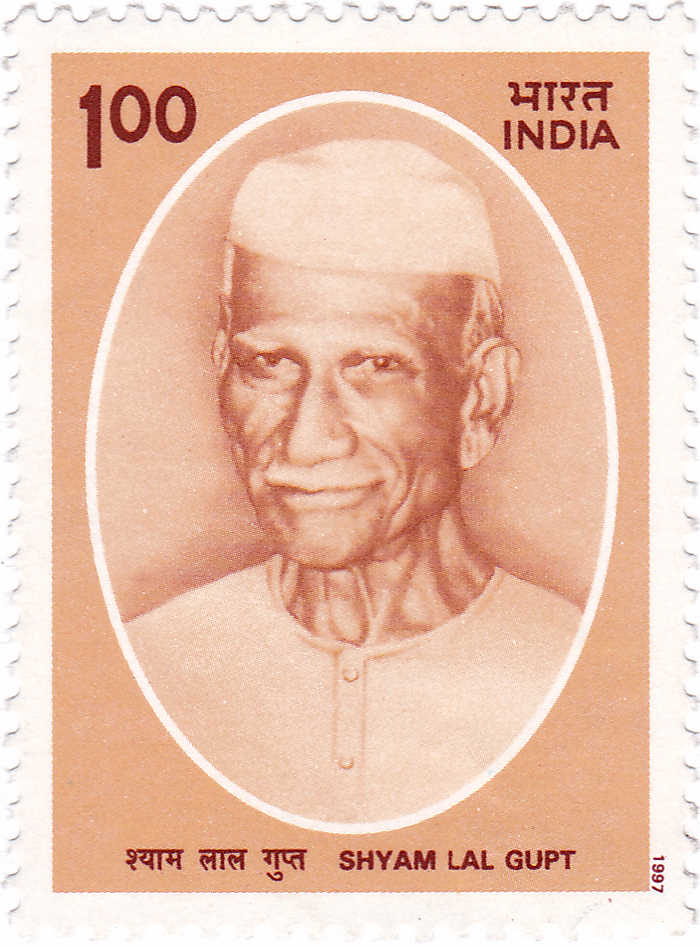
- Born: 9 September 1896; Kanpur, North-Western Provinces, British India
- Died: 10 August 1977 (aged 80); India
- Occupation: Poet
- Known for: Indian flag song
- Parent(s): Visheshwar Prasad; Kaushalya Devi
- Awards: Padma Shri (1973)

Shyamlal Gupta, popularly known by his pen name Parshad, (9 September 1896 – 10 August 1977) was an Indian poet and lyricist. A song written by him which featured in the 1948 Hindi film, Azadi Ki Raah Par, (sung by Sarojini Naidu), has been accepted as the flag song of India and is sung every year during the flag hoisting ceremony at the Independence Day and Republic Day celebrations. He was the recipient of the fourth highest civilian award (Padma Shri) in 1973. In 1997, the Government of India issued a postage stamp in his honor. In 1939.

== Biography ==
Shyamlal Gupta was born on 9 September 1896 as the youngest son of Visheshwar Prasad and Kaushalya Devi, in Dosar Vaishya community in Narwal, Kanpur. Refusing to join the family business, he took up teaching as a career and worked at various government schools in Kanpur, while also participating in the Indian Independence Movement. His chance of meeting Ganesh Shankar Vidyarthi at one of the conventions of the Indian National Congress brought him the charge of the freedom campaigns of Fatehpur town. He was arrested by the authorities of the British Raj in 1921 and worked covertly upon release. He was also arrested later, in 1930 and 1944, and was incarcerated on both occasions. Gupta held the post of President of the Fatehpur District Congress Committee for 19 years. He was known to have avoided using footwear and umbrellas until Indian Independence, following a personal vow. He died on 10 August 1977, at the age of 81.

As an honor, Gupta was selected to sing the flag song on 15 August 1952 during the Independence Day celebrations. During the Republic Day celebrations in 1972, Gupta was celebrated by the then Prime Minister, Indira Gandhi, who awarded him with a scroll of honor. The Government of India also awarded him the civilian honor of Padma Shri in 1973. Two decades after his death, on 4 March 1997, Shankar Dayal Sharma, then president of India, released a postage stamp in his honor.

=== Flag song ===
The song was originally written by Gupta in March 1924 as a patriotic poem and was released by Khanna Press in Kanpur, The poem sold over 5000 copies. The Indian National Congress adopted the song as the official flag song in 1924 and it was first sung at the Jallianwala Bagh Martyrs' Day on 13 April 1924 at Phool Bagh in Kanpur, a function attended by Jawaharlal Nehru. In 1938, Sarojini Naidu presented the song at the Haripura Session of the Indian National Congress in the presence of freedom leaders such as Mahatma Gandhi, Motilal Nehru, Jawaharlal Nehru, Dr Rajendra Prasad, Govind Vallabh Pant, Jamnalal Bajaj, Mahadev Desai, and Purushottam Das Tandon. A decade later, the song was featured in the film, Azadi ki Raah Par, released in 1948. The film was directed by Lalit Chandra Mehta, and had Prithviraj Kapoor and Vanamala Pawar in the lead roles. The song, composed by Shekhar Kalyan and sung by Sarojini Naidu, is reported to have instilled a sense of patriotism among Indians during the pre-independence period. It is sung every year during the flag hoisting ceremony at the Independence Day and Republic Day celebrations.

The song in Hindi:

विजयी विश्व तिरंगा प्यारा, झण्डा ऊँचा रहे हमारा।

सदा शक्ति बरसाने वाला, प्रेम सुधा सरसाने वाला। वीरों को हर्षाने वाला, मातृ भूमि का तन मन सारा॥ झण्डा ऊँचा रहे हमारा ...

स्वतंत्रता के भीषण रण में, रख कर जोश बढ़े क्षण-क्षण में। काँपे शत्रु देखकर मन में, मिट जाये भय संकट सारा॥ झण्डा ऊँचा रहे हमारा ...

इस झँडे के नीचे निर्भय, हो स्वराज जनता का निश्चय। बोलो भारत माता की जय, स्वतंत्रता ही ध्येय हमारा॥ झण्डा ऊँचा रहे हमारा ...

आओ प्यारे वीरों आओ, देश धर्म पर बलि-बलि जाओ। एक साथ सब मिल कर गाओ, प्यारा भारत देश हमारा॥ झण्डा ऊँचा रहे हमारा ...

शान न इसकी जाने पाये, चाहे जान भले ही जाये। विश्व विजयी कर के दिखलाएं, तब हो ये प्रण पूर्ण हमारा॥ झण्डा ऊँचा रहे हमारा ...

== Awards and recognition ==
- 1973: Received the fourth highest civilian award (Padma Shri) in 1973. Page 50 - Sr No. 59

== See also ==
- Flag of India
- Indian independence movement
