= Vikas Gupta (politician) =

Indian politician from Uttar Pradesh

Member of Legislative Assembly, Uttar Pradesh Legislative Assembly
- Incumbent
- Assumed office 11 March 2017
- Preceded by: Ayodhya Prasad Pal
- Constituency: Ayah Shah

Personal details
- Political party: Bharatiya Janata Party

Vikas Gupta is an Indian politician from Fatehpur, Uttar Pradesh, affiliated with Bhartiya Janata Party. He is member of the Uttar Pradesh Legislative Assembly, elected in 2017.
