= Bindki Assembly constituency =

Constituency of the Uttar Pradesh legislative assembly in India

Coordinates: 26.03°N 80.58°E

Bindki
- Constituency No. 239 for the Uttar Pradesh Legislative Assembly

Constituency details
- Country: India
- Region: North India
- State: Uttar Pradesh
- District: Fatehpur
- Total electors: 3,12,930 (2022)
- Reservation: None

Member of Legislative Assembly
- 18th Uttar Pradesh Legislative Assembly
- Incumbent Jai Kumar Singh Jaiki
- Party: AD(S)
- Alliance: NDA
- Elected year: 2022

Most Successful parties from Bindki assembly
1. Bharatiya Janata Party (3 times) (18.8%)
2. Indian National Congress (4 times) (25.0%)
3. Bahujan Samaj Party (3 times) (18.8%)
4. Janata Dal (2 times) (12.5%)
5. Others (4 times) (25.0%)

Bindki is a constituency of the Uttar Pradesh Legislative Assembly covering the city of Bindki in the Fatehpur district of Uttar Pradesh, India.

Bindki is one of six assembly constituencies in the Fatehpur Lok Sabha constituency. Since 2008, this constituency is numbered 239 amongst 403 Lok Sabha constituencies.

Currently this seat belongs to Apna Dal (Sonelal) candidate Jai Kumar Singh Jaiki who won in last Assembly election of 2022 Uttar Pradesh Legislative Elections defeating Samajwadi Party candidate Rameshwar Dayal urf Dayalu Omer by a margin of 3797 votes.

== Wards/Area ==
It contains these parts of Fatehpur district-
1. Joniha, Bindki (NPP), Malwan, Bindki MB of Bindki Tehsil
2. Kandhi of Fatehpur Tehsil.

== Elected MLAs ==
Year	Winner	Party	Ref.
1962	Jagannath Singh	Indian National Congress
1967	Ramakant Dwivedi	Indian National Congress
1969	Panna Lal Gupta	Bharatiya Kranti Dal
1974	Ramakant Dwivedi	Indian National Congress
1977	Jagannath Singh	Janata Party
1980	Ram Pyare Pandey	Indian National Congress
1985	Achal Singh	Bharatiya Lok Dal
1989	Achal Singh	Janata Dal
1991	Abhimanyu Singh	Janata Dal
1993	Amarjeet Singh	Bharatiya Janata Party
1996	Rajendra Singh Patel	Bahujan Samaj Party
2002	Amarjeet Singh	Bharatiya Janata Party
2007	Sukhdev Prasad Verma	Bahujan Samaj Party
2012	Sukhdev Prasad Verma	Bahujan Samaj Party
2017	Karan Singh Patel	Bharatiya Janata Party
2022	Jai Kumar Singh Jaiki	Apna Dal (Sonelal)

== Election results ==
=== 2027 ===
2027 Uttar Pradesh Legislative Assembly election: Binki
Party	Candidate	Votes	%	±%
INDIA				
NDA				
BSP				
NOTA	None of the above			
Majority				
Turnout				
gain from		Swing		

=== 2022 ===
2022 Uttar Pradesh Legislative Assembly election: Bindki
Party	Candidate	Votes	%	±%
AD(S)	Jai Kumar Singh Jaiki	78,165	40.96	
SP	Rameshwar Dayal 'Dayalu Omer'	74,368	38.97	+16.35
BSP	Sushil Kumar Patel	23,358	12.24	−5.32
INC	Abhimanyu Singh	5,637	2.95	+1.86
Jan Adhikar Party	Laxmi Sagar	2,070	1.08	
CPI	Ganga Vishun	1,989	1.04	
NOTA	None of the above	1,726	0.9	−0.28
Majority		3,797	1.99	−28.66
Turnout		190,821	60.98	−0.94
AD(S) gain from BJP		Swing		

=== 2017 ===
2017 Uttar Pradesh Legislative Assembly election: Bindki
Party	Candidate	Votes	%	±%
BJP	Karan Singh Patel	97,996	53.27	
SP	Rameshwar Dayal	41,618	22.62	
BSP	Sukhdev Prasad Verma	32,297	17.56	
INC	Abhimanyu Singh	2,002	1.09	
LKD	Amarjeet Singh Jansewak	1,745	0.95	
NOTA	None of the above	2,142	1.18	
Majority		56,378	30.65	
Turnout		183,971	61.92	
BJP gain from BSP		Swing	+25.99	
