= Fatehpur, Uttar Pradesh Assembly constituency =

Constituency of the Uttar Pradesh legislative assembly in India

Coordinates: 25.92°N 80.81°E

Fatehpur
- Constituency No. 240 for the Uttar Pradesh Legislative Assembly

Constituency details
- Country: India
- Region: North India
- State: Uttar Pradesh
- District: Fatehpur
- Total electors: 3,73,143 (2022)
- Reservation: None

Member of Legislative Assembly
- 18th Uttar Pradesh Legislative Assembly
- Incumbent Chandra Prakash Lodhi
- Party: SP
- Elected year: 2022

Fatehpur is a constituency of the Uttar Pradesh Legislative Assembly covering the city of Fatehpur in the Fatehpur district of Uttar Pradesh, India. It is one of six assembly constituencies in the Fatehpur Lok Sabha constituency. Since 2008, this assembly constituency is numbered 240 amongst 403 constituencies.

The seat belongs to Samajwadi Party candidate Chandra Prakash Lodhi who won in the 2022 Uttar Pradesh Legislative Assembly election defeating BJP candidate Vikram Singh by a margin of 8601 votes.

== Elected MLA ==
Year	Winner	Party
1967	S. Hasan	Indian National Congress
1969	Uma Kant Bajpai	Bharatiya Jana Sangh
1974	Salahuddin Alias Nabban	Indian National Congress
1977	Ghufran Zahidi Khan	Janata Party
1980	Ghufran Zahidi Khan	Indian National Congress (I)
1985	Ghufran Zahidi Khan	Indian National Congress
1989	Syed Liyaqat Husain	Janata Dal
1991	Syed Qasim Hasan	Janata Dal
1993	Radhe Shyam Gupta	Bharatiya Janata Party
1996	Radhe Shyam Gupta	Bharatiya Janata Party
2002	Anand Prakash Lodhi	Bahujan Samaj Party
2007	Radhe Shyam Gupta	Bharatiya Janata Party
2012	Syed Qasim Hasan	Samajwadi Party
2014*	Vikram Singh	Bharatiya Janata Party
2017	Vikram Singh	Bharatiya Janata Party
2022	Chandra Prakash Lodhi	Samajwadi Party

- by poll

== Wards/Areas ==
It contains these parts of Fatehpur district- Rampur Thariyaon, Haswa, Nagar, Bahua (NP) & Fatehpur MB of Fatehpur Tehsil.

== Election results ==
=== 2027 ===
2027 Uttar Pradesh Legislative Assembly election: Fatehpur
Party	Candidate	Votes	%	±%
INDIA				
NDA				
BSP				
NOTA	None of the above			
Majority				
Turnout				
gain from		Swing		

=== 2022 ===
2022 Uttar Pradesh Legislative Assembly election: Fatehpur
Party	Candidate	Votes	%	±%
SP	Chandra Prakash	96,839	45.24	+15.53
BJP	Vikram Singh	88,238	41.22	−4.63
BSP	Ayuv Ahmad	20,363	9.51	−8.7
NOTA	None of the above	1,793	0.84	−0.17
Majority		8,601	4.02	−12.12
Turnout		214,050	59.87	+1.18
SP gain from BJP		Swing		

=== 2017 ===
2022 Uttar Pradesh Legislative Assembly election: Fatehpur
Party	Candidate	Votes	%	±%
BJP	Vikram Singh	89,481	45.85	
SP	Chandra Prakash Lodhi	57,983	29.71	
BSP	Ayyub Ahmad	35,548	18.21	
CPI(M)	Gaya Prasad	2,013	1.03	
NOTA	None of the above	1,961	1.01	
Majority		31,498	16.14	
Turnout		195,168	58.69	
SP gain from BJP		Swing		
