= Bhidaura =

Village in Uttar Pradesh, India

Bhidaura (भिदौरा)
- Village
- Location in Uttar Pradesh, India
- Coordinates: 26.97236°N 78.86569°E
- Country: India
- State: Uttar Pradesh
- District: Mainpuri
- Tehsil: Karhal

Area
  - Total: 4.090 km^{2} (1.579 sq mi)

Population (2011)
  - Total: 2,315
  - Density: 566.0/km^{2} (1,466/sq mi)
- Time zone: UTC+5:30 (IST)

Bhidaura (Bhidaurā) is a village in Barnahal block of Mainpuri district, Uttar Pradesh. As of 2011, it has a population of 2,315, in 398 households.

== Demographics ==
As of 2011, Bhidaura had a population of 2,315, in 398 households. This population was 53.1% male (1,230) and 46.9% female (1,085). The 0-6 age group numbered 372 (188 male and 184 female), or 16.1% of the total population. 387 residents were members of Scheduled Castes, or 16.7% of the total.

The 1961 census recorded Bhidaura as comprising 4 hamlets, with a total population of 897 people (482 male and 415 female), in 159 households and 118 physical houses. The area of the village was given as 1,011 acres.

== Infrastructure ==
As of 2011, Bhidaura had 1 primary school; it did not have any kind of healthcare facilities. Drinking water was provided by hand pump and tube well; there were no public toilets. The village had a public library but no post office; there was at least some access to electricity for all purposes. Streets were made of both kachcha and pakka materials.
