= Sohan Lal Dwivedi =

Indian poet and freedom fighter (1906-1988)

- Born: 22 February 1906; Bindki, Fatehpur, Uttar Pradesh, India
- Died: 1 March 1988 (aged 82)
- Occupations: Poet, freedom fighter
- Awards: Padma Shri

Sohan Lal Dwivedi (22 February 1906 – 1 March 1988) was an Indian poet, Gandhian and freedom fighter, known for his patriotic poems such as Tumhe Naman, a poem on Mahatma Gandhi, Ali Racho Chand, Khadi Geet, Giriraj, Nayanon ki Resham Dori se, Mathrubhumi, Prakriti Sandesh, Jay Rashtra Nishan, Re Man, Vandana and Himalay. Born on 22 February 1906 at Bindki, a small town in Fatehpur in the Indian state of Uttar Pradesh, he secured a master's degree (MA) in Hindi and did higher studies in Sanskrit. He published several anthologies like Bhairavi, Pooja Geet, Prabhati, Yugadhar, Kunal, Chetna and Basuri. Hum Balveer and Andheri Raath are two of his other notable works.

He was deeply influenced by Mahatma Gandhi and in the following lines he described Gandhiji's popularity. चल पड़े जिधर दो डगमग में, चल पड़े कोटि पग उसी ओर।

Dwivedi died in Kanpur on 1 March 1988 at the age of 82. Considered as a national poet, he was honoured by the Government of India in 1970 with Padma Shri, the fourth highest Indian civilian award.

== See also ==
- Indian freedom movement
