= Sadhvi Niranjan Jyoti =

Indian politician (born 1967)

Niranjan Jyoti
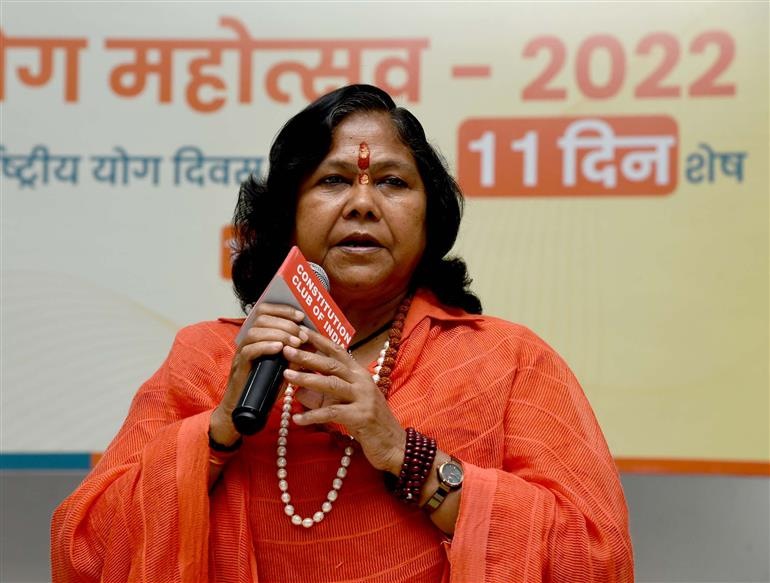
- Niranjan Jyoti in 2022

Chairperson of National Commission for Backward Classes
- Incumbent
- Assumed office 18 March 2026
- Prime Minister: Narendra Modi
- Preceded by: Hansraj Gangaram Ahir

Minister of State for Rural Development
- In office 30 May 2019 – 11 June 2024
- Prime Minister: Narendra Modi
- Preceded by: Ram Kripal Yadav
- Succeeded by: Kamlesh Paswan

Minister of State for Consumer Affairs, Food and Public Distribution
- In office 8 July 2021 – 11 June 2024
- Prime Minister: Narendra Modi
- Preceded by: Raosaheb Dadarao Danve
- Succeeded by: Nimuben Bambhaniya

Minister of State for Food Processing Industries
- In office 8 November 2014 – 30 May 2019
- Prime Minister: Narendra Modi
- Preceded by: Sanjeev Balyan
- Succeeded by: Rameswar Teli

Member of Parliament, Lok Sabha
- In office 16 May 2014 – 4 June 2024
- Preceded by: Rakesh Sachan
- Succeeded by: Naresh Uttam Patel
- Constituency: Fatehpur

Personal details
- Born: 1 March 1967 (age 59) Patewra, Uttar Pradesh, India
- Party: Bharatiya Janata Party
- Profession: Kathavahchak (Religious storyteller)

Niranjan Jyoti (born 1 March 1967), more commonly known as Sadhvi Niranjan Jyoti, is a Hindu monk and Indian politician belonging to Bharatiya Janata Party (BJP). She was appointed as President of National Commission for Backward Classes on 18 March 2026. She was appointed the Minister of State for Food Processing Industries in November 2014. On 30 May 2019, she was appointed Minister of state in the Ministry of Rural Development in the Narendra Modi Cabinet.

She represents the Fatehpur constituency, Uttar Pradesh, in the Lok Sabha, after having won the 2014 general election. She also represented the Hamirpur constituency in the Uttar Pradesh Legislative Assembly after her success in the 2012 election.

== Life and career ==
Niranjan Jyoti was born on 1 March 1967 in the village of Patewra, in Hamirpur district, Uttar Pradesh. Her father was Achyutanand and mother was Shiv Kali Devi. She was born in a Nishad-caste family.

On 14 June 2014, one man called Bhanu Patel and his three accomplices fired at Jyoti as she was returning from a function in Awas Vikas Colony, Lucknow. She escaped unhurt but her bodyguard was injured.

In May 2019, Jyoti became Minister of State for Rural Development.

== Personal views and controversies ==
On 1 December 2014, she stated at a public rally, "It is you whom must decide whether the government in Delhi will be run by the sons of Rama (raamzaade) or by bastards (haraamzaade)" referring to the opposition leader. The statement caused an uproar in the Parliament. She subsequently expressed regret over her statements and offered to apologize.
