= Mahendra Prasad Nishad =

Indian politician

Ex MP
- Constituency: Fatehpur (Lok Sabha Constituency) Tindwari (Vidhan Sabha Constituency)

Personal details
- Born: 30 November 1967 (age 58) Banda, Uttar Pradesh
- Party: BSP
- Spouse: Gomti Nishad
- Children: 2 sons and 2 daughters
- As of 5, 2018

Mahendra Prasad Nishad (born 30 November 1967) is a member of parliament for the Fatehpur (Lok Sabha Constituency) in Uttar Pradesh.

Educational Qualifications	Graduate Educated at P.J.N. Degree College, Banda, Bundelkhand University, Jhansi (Uttar Pradesh)

Other Information
Chairman, U.P. Electronic Corporation, 1997

Positions Held
1996-2001	Member, Uttar Pradesh Legislative Assembly
2004	Elected to 14th Lok Sabha
	Chief Whip, BSP, Parliamentary Party, Lok Sabha
	Member, Committee on Estimates
	Member, Committee on Information and Broadcasting and Culture
	Member, Committee on Official Language
	Member, Committee on Urban Development
