= Bashir Ahmed (Member of Parliament) =

Indian lawyer and politician

Member of Parliament, Lok Sabha
- In office 1977–1979
- Constituency: Fatehpur

Personal details
- Education: LL.B
- Alma mater: Allahabad University

Bashir Ahmad (1926 – 1978) was an Indian lawyer and politician. He was the member of Parliament (Loksabha) from Fatehpur.

== Political career ==
Bashir Ahmad was born on June 15, 1926, in Surviywom, Varanasi, the son of Ahmad Husain. He studied Law at Allahabad University, obtaining LL.B. degree. He served as an advocate at the Supreme Court and the High Court. In 1974 he argued the first Maintenance of Internal Security Act before the Supreme Court. The following year he argued the Presidential Election Reference case. He held a number of positions in Islamic institutions; such as serving as manager of the Arabic Madrassa Alia in Allahabad, executive committee member of the All India Muslim Personal Law Board, general secretary of the Indo-Arab Society and member of the Dargah Committee of Ajmer. He served as the president of All India Minorities Civil Rights Association.

Bashir Ahmad was a member of the Muslim Majlis. He had been linked to the Indian National Congress and the Bharatiya Lok Dal. In the 1977 Indian general election he won the Fatehpur seat, contesting as a Janata Party candidate.

Bashir Ahmad died on March 2, 1978.
