= Jahanabad, Uttar Pradesh Assembly constituency =

Constituency of the Uttar Pradesh legislative assembly in India

Coordinates: 26.10°N 80.36°E

Jahanabad
- Constituency No. 238 for the Uttar Pradesh Legislative Assembly

Constituency details
- Country: India
- Region: North India
- State: Uttar Pradesh
- District: Fatehpur
- Total electors: 3,11,482 (2022)
- Reservation: None

Member of Legislative Assembly
- 18th Uttar Pradesh Legislative Assembly
- Incumbent Rajendra Singh Patel
- Party: Bharatiya Janata Party
- Elected year: 2022

Jahanabad Assembly constituency is one of the 403 assembly constituencies of Uttar Pradesh, India. It is part of Fatehpur district. It contains these parts of Fatehpur district- Amauli, Tappajar, Paprenda, Jahanabad, Khajuha & Kora Jahanabad (NP) of Bindki Tehsil. In 1952, the first Member of Legislative Assembly / MLA / Vidhayak for Jahanabad constituency Guru Prashad Pandey contested election with the support of Swargiya Satyapal Gupta (Lambardar) and all expenses of election were picked up by him.

In 1962-67 during the third legislative assembly of Uttar Pradesh Sri Ram Kishore Verma became Independent M.L.A. by defeating Shabbir Hasan from Tappajar Constituency (Jahanabad). district Fatehpur. His election symbol was the SCALES (Taraju).

Father-Sri Nainsukh, Mother-Tulshi Devi, Born in 1923 at village asadhna, P.O. Rar District-Kanpur. Married Shyama Devi in 1941. The wife died, one son Ram Gopal Verma and one daughter Rampyari. Has been general secretary of tehshil congress committee, Ghatampur (kanpur); Sarpanch of Nyaya panchayat and has been associated with educational institutions. Is manager of Adarsh Natak Samaj, Asadhna. Interest in Dramaturgy. People remember him 'JANPRIYA' leader Ram Kishor Verm"a MANTRI"JI.

Data has been collected from Who's who of P. LEGISLATIVE ASSEMBLY BOOK 1962 -67.

== Members of Legislative Assembly ==
Year	Winner	Party	Runner up	Party	Ref.
1974	Prem Datt Tiwari	Indian National Congress	Chhatrapal Verma	Bharatiya Kranti Dal	
1977	Quasim Hasan	Janata Party	Chhatrapal Verma	Independent	
1980	Jagdish Narain	Indian National Congress (I)	Ram Kishore Verma	Lokdal	
1985	Prakash Naraian	Indian National Congress	Naresh Chandra Uttam	Lokdal	
1989	Naresh Chandra Uttam	Janata Dal	Prem Datt Tiwari	Indian National Congress	
1991	Chattra Pal Verma	Janata Dal	Shree Dhar Shukla	Bharatiya Janata Party	
1993	Madan Gopal Verma	Janata Dal	Naresh Chandra Uttam	Samajwadi Party	
1996	Qasim Hasan	Bahujan Samaj Party	Naresh Chandra Uttam	Samajwadi Party	
2002	Madan Gopal Verma	Samajwadi Party	Syed Kasim Hasan	Janata Party	
2007	Aditya Pandey	Bahujan Samaj Party	Madan Gopal Verma	Samajwadi Party	
2012	Madan Gopal Verma	Samajwadi Party	Sameer Trivedi	Bahujan Samaj Party	
2017	Jai Kumar Singh Jaiki	Apna Dal (Sonelal)	Madan Gopal Verma	Samajwadi Party	
2022	Rajendra Singh Patel	Bharatiya Janata Party	Madan Gopal Verma	Samajwadi Party	

== Election results ==
=== 2027 ===
2027 Uttar Pradesh Legislative Assembly election: Jahanabad
Party	Candidate	Votes	%	±%
INDIA				
NDA				
BSP				
NOTA	None of the above			
Majority				
Turnout				
gain from		Swing		

=== 2022 ===
2022 Uttar Pradesh Legislative Assembly election: Jahanabad
Party	Candidate	Votes	%	±%
BJP	Rajendra Singh Patel	78,503	41.21	
SP	Madan Gopal Verma	60,311	31.66	+13.02
BSP	Aditya Pandey	39,205	20.58	+2.94
INC	Kamla Devi	3,550	1.86	
Jan Adhikar Party	Anoop Sachan	2,250	1.18	+0.71
NOTA	None of the above	1,529	0.8	+0.1
Majority		18,192	9.55	−16.68
Turnout		190,500	61.16	−0.1
BJP gain from AD(S)		Swing		

=== 2017 ===
2017 Uttar Pradesh Legislative Assembly election: Jahanabad
Party	Candidate	Votes	%	±%
AD(S)	Jai Kumar Singh Jaiki	81,438	44.87	
SP	Madan Gopal Verma	33,832	18.64	
BSP	Ram Narayan Nishad	32,010	17.64	
RLD	Aditya Pandey	21,812	12.02	
Bharatiya Shakti Chetna Party	Vivek Kumar	2,117	1.17	
NOTA	None of the above	1,262	0.7	
Majority		47,606	26.23	
Turnout		181,500	61.26	
AD(S) gain from SP		Swing		
