= Ayodhya Prasad Pal =

Indian politician

Ayodhya Prasad Pal is the Ex MLA from 16th Uttar Pradesh Legislative Assembly. He was elected from Ayadshah constituency in 2012.

Pal was affiliated to Bahujan Samaj Party and was a cabinet minister in the government. In 2018, his bungalow was forfeited by Bank of Baroda. Amar Ujala reported that Pal owed INR 4 Crores to various financial institutions. In 2018, since BSP didn't give him a ticket, Ayodhya Prasad Pal defected to Samajwadi Party. There were alleged cases of wealth disproportionation and of illegally taking land in Fatehpur and other districts.
