= Shivrajpur =

- Nagar Panchayat
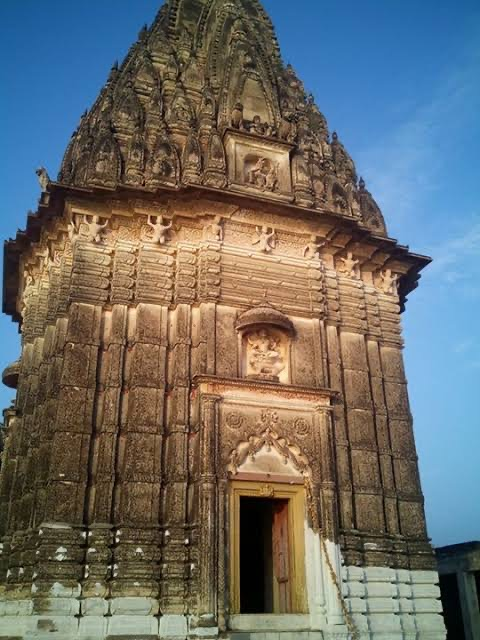

- Location in Uttar Pradesh, India
- Coordinates: 26°51′26″N 79°06′54″E
- Country: India
- State: Uttar Pradesh
- District: Kanpur Nagar

Government
  - Body: Nagar Panchayat

Population
  - Total: 11,948

Languages
  - Official: Hindi, English
- Time zone: UTC+5:30 (IST)
- PIN: 209205
- Telephone code: Code-05112
- Vehicle registration: UP78
- Sex ratio: 53 percent ♂/♀

Shivrajpur is a town and "nagar panchayat" (Notified Area Council) in Kanpur Nagar district in the Indian state of Uttar Pradesh. It comes under Kanpur Metropolitan Area. Tecson India Solution

Shivrajpur has an ancient temple, Khereshwar, which is associated with Dronacharya and his son Ashwatthama. It was built by Raja Sati Prasad in memory of his queen. This temple is situated on the banks of river Ganges, and according to local legend was built in a day. It is renowned for its beautiful architectural work and unique carving design.

One inter college and one degree college are situated in Shivrajpur near GT road. The described historical temple is very famous all over Kanpur and its name is Khereshwar temple. Near to this temple one temple of Mahakaal is also very famous.

== Demographics ==
As of 2011 India census, Shivrajpur had a population of 11,948. Males constitute 53% of the population and females 47%. Shivrajpur has an average literacy rate of 62%, higher than the national average of 59.5%: male literacy is 69%, and female literacy is 55%. In Shivrajpur, 16% of the population is under 6 years of age.

== Khereshwar Temple ==
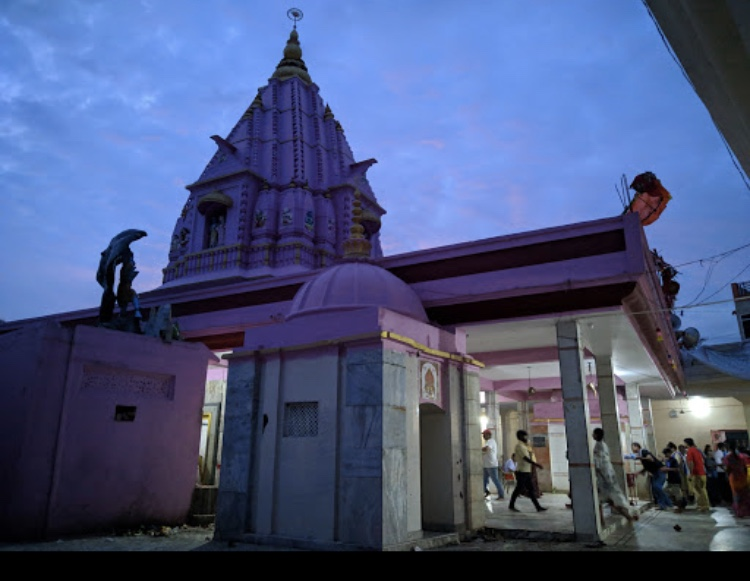
Khereshwar Temple

Khereshwar Temple is a Hindu temple dedicated to the Lord Shiva. It is 40km From Kanpur. Mythology states that Ashwathama still visits this temple every night to perform Puja. It is believed he is in search of Moksha by worshipping Lord Shiva.

== Tourist attractions ==
- Mahakaal Shiv Temple
- Ganga River
- Ganga Bridge
- Bhuteshwar Temple

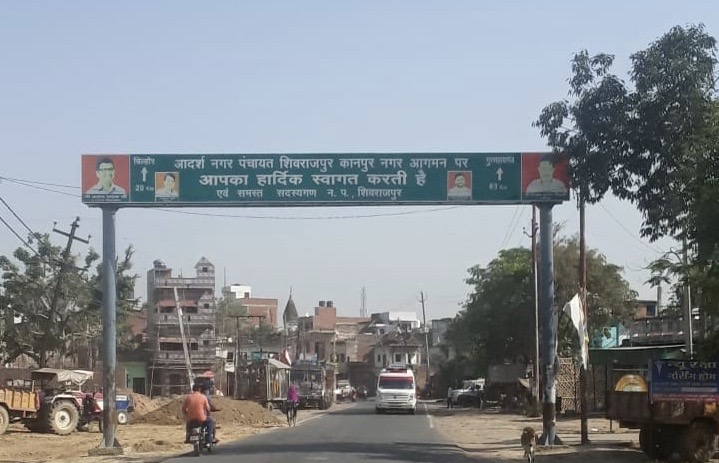
Main Gate of Starting Town from Kanpur City

== Transport ==
This town is connected via National Highway with railway station Kanpur to Farrukhabad North Central Railway line where fast and super fast train are available to Mathura, Agra, Delhi, Meerut, Bilhaur.This town is directly connected by National Highway NH 91 to Kanpur city.

Also, Shivrajpur has direct highway to Lucknow through new Ganga Bridge.
