= Khajuha =

- Village
- Map showing Khajuha (#554) in Khiron CD block

- Location in Uttar Pradesh, India
- Coordinates: 26.312352°N 80.918302°E
- Country India: India
- State: Uttar Pradesh
- District: Raebareli

Area
  - Total: 1.806 km^{2} (0.697 sq mi)

Population (2011)
  - Total: 1,260
  - Density: 698/km^{2} (1,810/sq mi)

Languages
  - Official: Hindi
- Time zone: UTC+5:30 (IST)
- Vehicle registration: UP-35

Khajuha is a village in Khiron block of Rae Bareli district, Uttar Pradesh, India. It is located 19 km from Lalganj, the tehsil headquarters. As of 2011, it has a population of 1,260 people, in 237 households. It has one primary school and no healthcare facilities.

The 1961 census recorded Khajuha as comprising 3 hamlets, with a total population of 501 people (253 male and 248 female), in 93 households and 85 physical houses. The area of the village was given as 425 acres.

The 1981 census recorded Khajuha as having a population of 701 people, in 112 households, and having an area of 180.49 hectares. The main staple foods were given as wheat and rice.
