= Jai Kumar Singh Jaiki =

Indian politician

Jai Kumar Singh (Jaiki)

MoS, Jail & Public Service Management, Government of Uttar Pradesh
- In office 23 March 2017 – 10 March 2022

Member of Legislative Assembly, Uttar Pradesh
- In office 11 March 2017 – 10 March 2022
- Preceded by: Madan Gopal Verma
- Succeeded by: Rajendra Singh Patel
- Constituency: Jahanabad

Member of Legislative Assembly, Uttar Pradesh
- Incumbent
- Assumed office 10 March 2022
- Preceded by: Karan Singh Patel
- Constituency: Bindki

Personal details
- Party: Apna Dal (Sonelal)
- Parent: Ram Aasare
- Profession: Politician

Jai Kumar Singh is an Indian politician and was Minister of State for Jail and Public Service Management in the Government of Uttar Pradesh. He was elected to 17th Vidhan Sabha as Apna Dal (Sonelal) candidate from Jahanabad constituency of Fatehpur district. Then he was elected to 18th Vidhan Sabha as Apna Dal (Sonelal) candidate from Bindki constituency of Fatehpur district.

== Political career ==
Jaiki was born in a Kurmi family in Jaddupur, Fatehpur. He is member of Apna Dal (Sonelal). He has been a member of the 17th Legislative Assembly of Uttar Pradesh from Jahanabad. Now he is member of 18th Legislative Assembly of Uttar Pradesh from Bindki.

== Posts held ==
#	From	To	Position	Constituency
01	2017	2022	Member, 17th Legislative Assembly	Jahanabad
02	2022	Incumbent	Member, 18th Legislative Assembly	Bindki

== See also ==
- Yogi Adityanath ministry (2017–)
