= Rajendra Singh Patel =

Indian politician

Member of Legislative Assembly, Uttar Pradesh
- In office 1996–2002
- Preceded by: Amarjeet Singh
- Succeeded by: Amarjeet Singh
- Constituency: Bindki

Minister of Rural Development, Uttar Pradesh
- In office 23 April 1998 – 18 January 2002
- Constituency: Bindki

Rajendra Singh Patel is an Indian politician. He is an MLA from 238-Jahanabad constituency in Fatehpur district of Uttarpradesh. He became MLA for a second time in 2022 general election. He contested election for the first time in 1996 from 239-Bindki constituency and became Rural development minister. He is famous among the people due to his politeness, kindness and simplicity. He is also famous among the people as विकासपुरुष as he did much unprecedented development work in 239-Bindki constituency during his ministerial tenure 1997-2002.

In 1996, he was elected to the Uttar Pradesh Legislative Assembly from Bindki on a BSP ticket. However, in February 1998 he was among the five BSP MLAs who joined the Jantantrik Bahujan Samaj Party and voted in support of the BJP candidate Kalyan Singh for the post of Chief Minister. Patel was rewarded with a minister portfolio, serving as Minister of Rural Engineering Service and later as Minister of Rural Development. He resigned in January 2002, after the BJP announced it would field its own candidate for the Bindki seat in the 2002 Assembly polls.

Patel nevertheless contested the Bindki seat in 2002 on behalf of the Lok Janshakti Party, but finished second. For the 2007 and 2012 Assembly elections, he was the BJP candidate from Bindki, but lost on both occasions to Sukhdev Prasad Verma of the BSP. He did not contest the 2017 election. Now in 2022 he fought from BJP ticket against 3 times MLA Madan Gopal Verma (SP) and Aditya Pandey (BSP) in Jahanabad constituency and recorded unprecedented victory with good margin of votes despite adverse conditions. This is the first time victory of any BJP candidate after independence in 238-Jahanabad constituency. Rajendra has two boys named Rahul and Rohit, Rahul is working in TCS as software engineer and Rohit is deputed as Civil Engineer in DMRC Organisation.

Various Posts held by Rajendra Singh Patel-

MLA (239-Bindki, Fatehpur) (1996),

State Minister Rural Development (1998-2002),

State Executive Member BJP Uttar Pradesh (2015-2018)

Chunav Adhikari Jila Shrawasti (2019),

Prabhari Chitrakoot-Banda loksabha (2019),

MLA (238-Jahanabad, Fatehpur) (2022- )
