= Fatehpur district =

- District of Uttar Pradesh
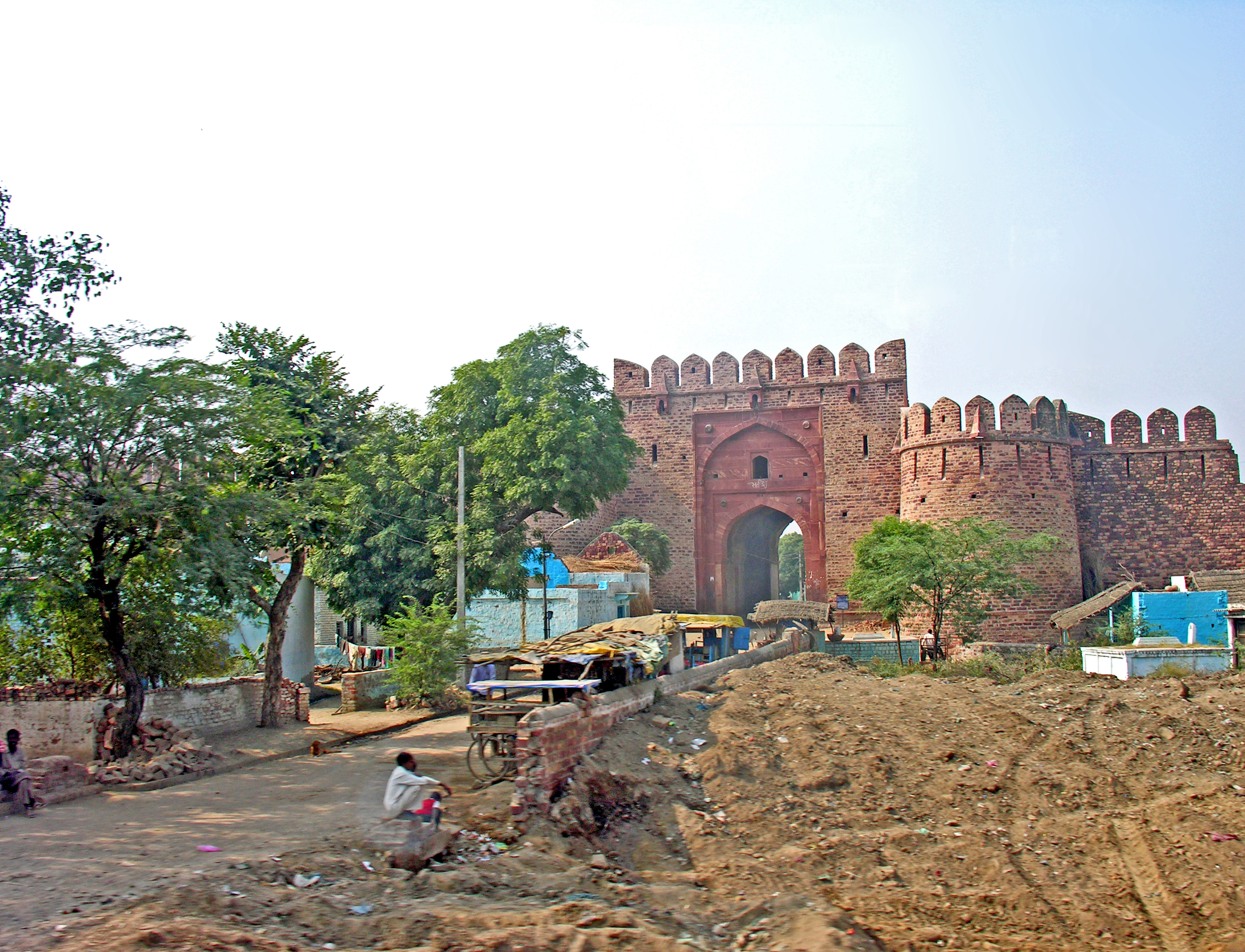
- Fort in Fatehpur

- Location of Fatehpur district in Uttar Pradesh
- Country: India
- State: Uttar Pradesh
- Division: Prayagraj
- Headquarters: Fatehpur
- Tehsils: Fatehpur, Bindki and Khaga

Government
  - District collector: Ravinder Singh (IAS)
  - Lok Sabha constituencies: Fatehpur (Lok Sabha constituency)
  - Vidhan Sabha constituencies: 1. Jahanabad; 2. Bindki; 3. Sadar; 4. Ayah Shah; 5. Husainganj; 6. Khaga

Area
  - Total: 4,152 km^{2} (1,603 sq mi)

Population (2011)
  - Total: 2,632,733
  - Density: 634.1/km^{2} (1,642/sq mi)
  - Urban: 321,993 (12.2%)

Demographics
  - Literacy: 67.4%
  - Sex ratio: 901
- Time zone: UTC+05:30 (IST)
- Vehicle registration: UP-71
- Major highways: NH 19
- Website: fatehpur.nic.in

Fatehpur district is one of the 75 districts of the Indian state of Uttar Pradesh. The district has a population of 2,632,733 (2011 Census). Fatehpur city is its administrative headquarters.

== Etymology ==
Fatehpur district is named after its headquarters, the town Fatehpur. According to local legends, the name is derived from a battle won by Ibrahim Shah of Jaunpur over Raja Sita Nand of Athgarhia. The name of the conqueror is sometimes given as Jalal-ud-din, the ruler of Bengal. According to another tradition, the name originates from Fateh-mand Khan who supposedly founded the town. This tradition is based on a fragmentary inscription found at Denda Sai in Tehsil Khaga, which mentions that an officer of Sultan Ala-ud-din named Fatehmand Khan obtained a Farman from Fateh-mand Khan in 1519 A.D. However, there was no known king by the name Ala-ud-din at the time, meaning the title of the Sultan must be wrong for the date to be correct. Also, Denda Sai is about 48 kilometres (30 mi) from Fatehpur.

== History ==
=== Ancient ===
Grand Trunk Road passes through the district; it is one of Asia's major trading routes which back at least 2500 years. Fatehpur was mentioned in the Puranic literature. Bhitaura, the site of the sage Bhrigu, was historically an important source of learning.

In the ancient times the area was part of Madhyadesha, and was part of the Vatsa Mahajanapada with their capital at Kaushambi, which was monarchical. Their origin is debated, the epics and the Harivamsha record them being descended from a king of Kashi, while the Matsya Purana says that when the Ganga washed away Hastinapur, Nichakshu, 5th in descent from Parikshit, went to live in Kaushambi. During the time of the Buddha the Vatsas were ruled by a king named Udayana. Although there were many kings before him, they were not well-known and there only appear to have been four kings after him. Kshemaka, the last, seems to have seen his kingdom be absorbed into the Nanda Empire in the middle of the fourth century BCE. Afterwards it fell under Maurya rule until the death of Ashoka, when it came under Shunga dynasty rule until 78 BCE. However Shunga rule was never strong, particularly after an invasion by Indo Greeks under Demetrius. The Shungas were replaced by the Kanvas, but their control over the region lasted only a few decades until 30 BCE.

After the Kanva period, little is known about the region's history until the Gupta period. It may have been part of the Kushan Empire under Kanishka and remained under their rule until the death of the king Vasudeva. After the weakening of Kushan rule, the Maghas became powerful in the district and coins from their rule have been found in Fatehpur district. Bhadramagha, the grandson of the family's founder Bhimasena, seems to have wrested Kaushambi from Kushana control in around 175 CE, and ruled until 184 CE. Inscriptions and coins indicate his successors expanded the Magha domain to cover much of the Prayagraj region and Baghelkhand. The last of these rulers named in coins were Satamagha and Vijaymagha.

=== Early medieval ===
Under the Gupta Empire, the district was part of the Antarvedi (Doab) province. Following the Huna invasions and the decline of the Guptas, the Maukharis of Kannauj rose to power in the 6th century, before losing the district to Gauda and Malwa. The region reached a peak of stability under Harshavardhana; during this time, the Chinese traveler Xuanzang visited the area, and the monastery of Vasubandhu is traditionally identified with the modern village of Gunir in this district. In the 9th and 10th centuries, the district was a core territory of the Gurjara-Pratiharas until the rise of the Chandelas and the subsequent incursions of Mahmud of Ghazni. According to al-Utbi, a local chieftain, Chandal Bhar, who had often fought against Kannauj, grew terrified of Mahmud. Mahmud demolished his five forts and buried their inhabitants in the ruins. The Gahadavala dynasty restored order in 1090, maintaining a significant treasury and garrison at Asni until their defeat by the Ghurids in 1194.

=== Late medieval and Mughal periods ===
Following the Muslim conquest, nearby Kara in present Kaushambi district became the capital of a major province (iqta) encompassing the modern district. The region was a focal point of political intrigue; in 1296, Alauddin Khilji assassinated his uncle Jalaluddin at Kara to seize the Delhi throne. The independent rule of the Jaunpur Sultanate began from the region of this district, as their progenitor, Malik Sarwar, was given the entire region between Kannauj and Bihar as a fief with their initial seat in Kara. For much of the 15th century, the district was under the control of the Jaunpur Sultanate, before the Lodi dynasty reincorporated them and suppressed rebellions of the local Bachgoti Rajputs aided by the Raja of Rewa. At the time of the Mughal conquest of the Lodi dyansty, the district was effectively under the control of Jalal Khan, Ibrahim Lodi's brother, as an independent fief of the Sultanate, and later fell under the Suri Empire. After Humayun and Akbar retook their domains, they finally conquered Awadh in 1559. However the general which led that conquest, Ali Quli Khan Zaman, soon rebelled, and was defeated and killed by Akbar in battle in this district in 1567.

During the Mughal era, the district's strategic importance shifted. The Mughals constructed the Grand Trunk Road through the district, which improved connectivity through the Doab; previously the main route from Delhi east to Bihar and Bengal lay north of the Ganga. While initially maintaining the importance of Kara and Kora, the construction of the Allahabad Fort in 1584 led to the decline of Kara as an administrative centre. During Akbar's days, the Sarkars of Kara and Kora fell under Allahabad Subah, divided into dastars, or districts. Kara had one dastar, while Kora had three. Kara was further subdivided into 12 mahals, of which eight made up the present district: Fatehpur Haswa, Haswa, Kotla, Hathgaon, Aya Shah, Kunra, Aijhi and Rari. Kora made up 8 mahals of which four: Kora, Kuti, Kiratpur-Kananda and Gunir, became part of Fatehpur district, the others going to Kanpur. The parganas making up Fatehpur district were largely held by Brahmins and Rajputs, with some Afghans. In 1658, the district was the site of the Battle of Khajwa (near Kora), where Aurangzeb defeated his brother Shah Shuja to secure the throne.

Following the death of Aurangzeb in 1707, administrative authority in the Allahabad Subah fragmented as local governors and regional powers competed for control over the Doab. The district was initially governed by the Barha Sayyids, but after the victory of Emperor Farrukhsiyar, power shifted to Chhabila Ram Nagar, the Faujdar of Kara. His administration marked a period of local defiance, during which he briefly withheld imperial revenues from Bengal.

In 1721, administrative jurisdiction was granted to Muhammad Khan Bangash of Farrukhabad. However, his control was hampered by his military commitments in Malwa, allowing Chhatrasal of Bundelkhand and Maratha allies to foment local rebellions and briefly sack the district in 1736. A significant challenge to central authority arose from Bhagwant Singh of Asthohar, who killed the Faujdar of Kora and Kara to seize the district. Although imperial forces periodically reoccupied the forts, Bhagwant Singh maintained a guerrilla presence with Maratha support until he was eventually defeated by Saadat Khan, the Nawab of Awadh.

The mid-18th century was characterized by a power struggle between the Pathans of Farrukhabad and the Nawabs of Awadh for control of the district. In 1750, Ahmad Khan Bangash briefly ousted the Awadh administration, plunging the region into a period of anarchy. However, by 1753, the Nawabs of Awadh re-established firm administrative control over the district.

=== Colonial period and freedom struggle ===
In 1764, Awadh was defeated by the East India Company at Buxar, forcing Suja-ud-Daula to flee to Allahabad and compelling Shah Alam II to surrender to the British. Shuja-ud-Daula and the Marathas were defeated by the British near Kora and the Marathas fled after plundering Kora, forcing Shuja-ud-Daula to surrender to the English. Allahabad and Kora were returned to the Emperor, with Kora being held by a Company garrison. After the Marathas deposed Shah Alam II in 1775, the British saw this is forfeiture of his rights and sold the territory to Awadh for Rs. 50 lakh. For the next 25 years, it was administered by Mian Almas Khan with headquarters at Kora. In 1801, when the Awadh government was bankrupt and could no longer pay tribute, they ceded the lower Doab, Rohilkhand, Gorakhpur and other places to the East India Company, including what became this district. In 1814, a joint Magistrate in Charge was stationed in Bhitaura, the first step towards a Fatehpur district.

The district was a significant theater during the Indian Rebellion of 1857. Fueled by grievances over new revenue settlements, which created a class of disposessed landlords, and the annexation of Awadh, local residents and sepoys rose against East India Company rule in June 1857. Following the outbreak in Kanpur, European properties in Fatehpur were destroyed, and British civil authority collapsed. Hikmatullah Khan, the former Deputy Magistrate, was appointed Chakladar of Fatehpur by Nana Sahib, and led the uprising along with local Zamindar Jodha Singh Ataiya.

The district proved strategically vital for the British advance toward Kanpur. In a pivotal engagement, the revolutionary forces under Jwala Prasad were defeated by British relief columns; the failure of the rebels to destroy a key bridge in the district facilitated the eventual British recapture of Kanpur. Although guerrilla resistance continued into 1858, the district was largely brought back under British control by the middle of that year. The aftermath was marked by severe British reprisals. Most notable was the Bawani Imli massacre on 28 April 1858, where 52 freedom fighters, led by Jodha Singh Ataiya, were executed by hanging from a tamarind tree. Other prominent local leaders, including Hikmatullah and Dariyao Singh, were also martyred during the suppression of the uprising.

The people of the district took part in the Freedom Struggle, producing notable nationalist poets like Sohan Lal Dwivedi and Shyamlal Gupta. The non-cooperation movement also took place in the district.

== Geography ==
Fatehpur district is part of Prayagraj division. It is situated between two important cities, Prayagraj and Kanpur of the state of Uttar Pradesh, being 117 kilometres (73 mi) from Prayagraj and 76 kilometres (47 mi) from Kanpur. The state capital Lucknow is 137 kilometres (85 mi) away. The north boundary of the district is the river Ganges and its southern boundary is the river Yamuna. The district covers an area of 4,152 square kilometres (1,603 sq mi).

== Demographics ==
Historical population
| Year | Pop. | ±% p.a. |
|---|---|---|
| 1901 | 681,848 | — |
| 1911 | 672,459 | −0.14% |
| 1921 | 648,065 | −0.37% |
| 1931 | 684,218 | +0.54% |
| 1941 | 801,574 | +1.60% |
| 1951 | 902,928 | +1.20% |
| 1961 | 1,066,028 | +1.67% |
| 1971 | 1,278,549 | +1.83% |
| 1981 | 1,572,751 | +2.09% |
| 1991 | 1,899,387 | +1.90% |
| 2001 | 2,308,384 | +1.97% |
| 2011 | 2,632,733 | +1.32% |

Religions in Fatehpur district (2011)
| Religion | Percent |
| Hinduism | 86.40% |
| Islam | 13.32% |
| Other or not stated | 0.28% |
Distribution of religions

According to the 2011 Census of India, Fatehpur district has a population of 2,632,733. It ranks of 154th in India (out of a total of 640). The district has a population density of 634 inhabitants per square kilometre (1,640/sq mi). Its population growth rate over the decade 2001 to 2011 was 14.05%. Fatehpur has a sex ratio of 901 females for every 1000 males. Its literacy rate is 67.43%. 12.23% of the population lives in urban areas. Scheduled Castes make up 24.75% of the population.

Languages of Fatehpur district (2011)
1. Hindi (97.5%)
2. Urdu (2.49%)
3. Others (0.03%)

At the time of the 2011 Census, 97.48% of the population in the district spoke Hindi and 2.49% spoke Urdu as their first language. The local dialect is transitional from Kannauji in the west to Awadhi in the east. This district's main religion is Hinduism, including 86.4% of the population, followed by Muslims, who make up 13.32 % of the population and comprise a sizeable 30% in the district's historic towns such as Kora and Fatehpur.

== Divisions ==
The district is divided into three sub-districts (tehsils): Fatehpur, Bindki, and Khaga.

These sub-districts are further divided into thirteen development blocks:

- Airayan
- Amauli
- Asothar
- Bahua
- Bhitaura
- Devmai
- Dhata
- Haswa
- Hathgam
- Khajuha
- Malwan
- Telyani
- Vijayipur

== Culture ==
Fatehpur district includes several towns which are culturally significant.

Ghazipur is an ancient town that was visited by the Chinese monk Huan Tsuang in the mid-600s. It includes numerous historic structures and sites including Paina Quila (fort), Ghazipur Quila (fort; now a police station), Dargah (tomb), Tuglaki Masjid (mosque), and Murchaura (battlefield). It also includes the Subhas Market and Purani Bazaar

Kora is archaeologically important. It has two brick temples with intricate carvings on the outer faces; each panel has a different design. One temple is tilted in its axis about four degrees.

Bhitaura is situated on the bank of the Ganges where the river flows to the north; this is significant to the Hindu religion. This site is also where Saint Bhrigu was worshipped, giving it the name Bhrigu Thaura. The ghats of Bhitaura and Asani were described as sacred in the puranas.

Dhata is famous for its statue of Ravana and the Temple of Dadua in Kabraha. Dhata is located at the end of Fatehpur district and consists of twelve Purvas.

== Notable people ==
- Sohan Lal Dwivedi, a poet born in the Khutila-sijouli village of Bindki sub-division
- Niaz Fatehpuri, Urdu writer and poet
- Ranvendra Pratap Singh, State Minister of Agriculture, Government of Uttar Pradesh
- V. P. Singh, the 7th prime minister of India
- Ganesh Shankar Vidyarthi, an independence activist

== Transport ==
=== Roadways ===
Fatehpur is connected to other parts of Uttar Pradesh and India by national and state highways. The National Highway 19 (NH19) passes through Fatehpur. There are frequent buses to Kanpur, Prayagraj, Banda, and Lucknow.

=== Railways ===
Fatehpur is on the Howrah-Delhi train route between Prayagraj and Kanpur. Fatehpur Station is on the main route of New Delhi-Howrah. It has the longest platform of any station on the route from Howrah to Delhi.

On 10 July 2011, a Kalka Mail derailed near Malwan killed seventy passengers and injured more than 300.

=== Air ===
The nearest airport is Kanpur Airport which is 70 kilometres (43 mi) from Fatehpur. It is also accessible from Prayagraj Airport which is 124 kilometres (77 mi) from Fatehpur.
