= Fatehpur, Uttar Pradesh =

Fatehpur
- City
- Location in Uttar Pradesh, India Fatehpur (India)
- Coordinates: 25.93°N 80.8°E
- Country: India
- State: Uttar Pradesh
- District: Fatehpur
- Assembly Constituency: Fatehpur

Government
  - Type: Municipality
  - Body: Nagar Palika Parishad (NPP) Fatehpur
  - Chairman: Raj Kumar Maurya
  - MP: Naresh Uttam Patel (SP)
  - MLA: Chandra Prakash Lodhi (SP)
  - SDM: Prem Prakash Tiwari (PPS)

Area
  - Total: 57 km^{2} (22 sq mi)
- Elevation: 110 m (360 ft)

Population (2011)
  - Total: 193,193
  - Density: 3,400/km^{2} (8,800/sq mi)

Language
  - Official: Hindi
  - Additional official: Urdu
  - Regional: Awadhi
- Time zone: UTC+5:30 (IST)
- Postal code: 212601
- Vehicle registration: UP-71
- Website: fatehpur.nic.in

Fatehpur is a city in Fatehpur district in the state of Uttar Pradesh, India. Situated between the rivers Ganga and Yamuna. Fatehpur is located 120 km (75 mi) south of the state capital Lucknow.

== History ==
The known history of Fatehpur is as old as the Vedic era. Alexander Cunningham has written about "Bhitaura" and "Asani" places of this district, while discussing about the residuals of the Vedic era. There are proofs that the Chinese traveller Huen Tsang visited the Asani place of this district.

In the village Renh, which is 25 km south-west of Fatehpur town, some articles of archaeological interest have been found, from around 800 BC. Many articles like coins, bricks, idols, etc. of the Maurya period, Kushan period, and Gupta period have been found throughout the area, which are very important from an archaeological point of view. Golden coins of the period of Chandragupta II have been recovered from the village of Bijauli. The bricks used in the fort of Asani are also of the Gupta Period. The Khajuha town, situated on the Mughal road, is a very old town. Its description has been found in the old Hindu scripture "Brahma Purana". Mahmud Ghaznavi is reported to have captured Fatehpur during his campaigns against the Gahadavala dynasty. In 1561 AD, Mughal emperor Humayun passed through this town while invading Jaunpur Sultanate. On 5 January 1659, Mughal emperor Aurangzeb had a fierce battle with his brother, prince Shah Shuja and defeated him near this place, forcing him to flee to Burma. To celebrate the victory, he constructed a large, beautiful garden, "Badshahi Bagh" and a big lodge having 130 rooms.

During the Mughal regime, the control of Fatehpur shifted over time to the hands of Jaunpur, Delhi and Kannauj. In 1801, this region came under the control of the East India Company, and in 1814 it was given the status of a sub-division (Paragana), while the headquarters were at Bhitaura, which is now a block office. In 1826, Fatehpur was re-designated as a district headquarters.

The Bawani Imli massacre memorial built near Khajuha in Fatehpur has its own history. On 28 April 1858, the revolutionary Jodha Singh Ataiya and his 51 companions were hanged on a tamarind tree. Ataiya's memorial is in Khajuha.

== Geography ==
Fatehpur is located at 25.93°N 80.8°E. It has an average elevation of 110 metres (360 feet). This district is situated between two important cities - Prayagraj (erstwhile Allahabad) and Kanpur - of Uttar Pradesh. It is well connected with those cities by train route as well as bus route. The distance from Prayagraj is 117 km (73 mi) and 76 km (47 mi) from Kanpur. It lies in fertile land also known as 'Doab' between Ganges and Yamuna. National Highway 19 (NH-19) goes through the city. It is the junction for going to Banda, Prayagraj, Kanpur and Raebareli.

=== Climate ===
Climate data for Fatehpur (1991–2020, extremes 1932–2020)
Month	Jan	Feb	Mar	Apr	May	Jun	Jul	Aug	Sep	Oct	Nov	Dec	Year
Record high °C (°F)	32.2 (90.0)	35.5 (95.9)	41.7 (107.1)	45.8 (114.4)	47.8 (118.0)	48.1 (118.6)	44.0 (111.2)	41.0 (105.8)	40.0 (104.0)	38.9 (102.0)	36.4 (97.5)	31.1 (88.0)	48.1 (118.6)
Mean daily maximum °C (°F)	21.0 (69.8)	26.1 (79.0)	32.5 (90.5)	39.1 (102.4)	41.4 (106.5)	39.3 (102.7)	34.5 (94.1)	33.2 (91.8)	33.3 (91.9)	32.6 (90.7)	28.7 (83.7)	23.0 (73.4)	32.1 (89.8)
Mean daily minimum °C (°F)	8.8 (47.8)	12.2 (54.0)	16.6 (61.9)	21.7 (71.1)	25.4 (77.7)	27.2 (81.0)	26.4 (79.5)	25.7 (78.3)	25.3 (77.5)	21.0 (69.8)	15.4 (59.7)	10.2 (50.4)	19.5 (67.1)
Record low °C (°F)	−1.7 (28.9)	−1.6 (29.1)	1.7 (35.1)	7.4 (45.3)	11.7 (53.1)	15.4 (59.7)	15.1 (59.2)	14.6 (58.3)	12.4 (54.3)	10.5 (50.9)	1.7 (35.1)	−3.3 (26.1)	−3.3 (26.1)
Average rainfall mm (inches)	14.4 (0.57)	16.5 (0.65)	8.3 (0.33)	5.7 (0.22)	14.9 (0.59)	80.4 (3.17)	202.0 (7.95)	245.7 (9.67)	163.2 (6.43)	19.4 (0.76)	1.1 (0.04)	6.9 (0.27)	778.6 (30.65)
Average rainy days	1.4	1.2	0.7	0.6	1.2	4.2	11.2	11.2	7.6	1.2	0.2	0.6	41.3
Average relative humidity (%) (at 17:30 IST)	78	72	63	52	49	59	78	84	82	74	71	76	70
Source: India Meteorological Department

== Demographics ==
Religions in Fatehpur (2011)
Religion	Percent
Hinduism	68.74%
Islam	30.69%
Other or not stated	0.57%

As of 2011 census, Fatehpur City had a population of 193,193 out of which males were 101,263 and females were 91,930. The literacy rate was 76.50 per cent. Bahuwa Town had a population of 11,031 with 69.67% literacy rate. There are 528 villages in Fatehpur Tehsil with population of 892,229 with 65.51% literacy rate.

Languages in Fatehpur city (2011)
1. Hindi (88.6%)
2. Urdu (11.2%)
3. Others (0.11%)

At the time of the 2011 census, 88.64% of the population recorded their language as Hindi and 11.25% Urdu as their first language.

== Transport ==
=== Airways ===
Kanpur Airport is the nearest airport which is about 70 kilometres away. Allahabad Airport is the second nearest airport about 117 kilometres away.

=== Railways ===
Fatehpur railway station serves the city and is on the Howrah-Delhi main line. This is an A-Category railway station under the North Central Railway zone.

=== Roadways ===
Fatehpur has inter state bus station. NH 19 bypasses the city. NH 232 also passes through the city.

== Notable people ==
- VP Singh, the 7th prime minister of India, was elected to Parliament from Fatehpur.
- Sohan Lal Dwivedi, the great national poet of India
- Ganesh Shankar Vidyarthi
- Sadhvi Niranjan Jyoti, Minister of State for Food Processing Industries in Modi 1.0 Government.
