= Kaimur =

Kaimur may refer to:

- Kaimur Range, a hill range running across Madhya Pradesh, Uttar Pradesh and Bihar in India
- Kaimur district, an administrative district in Bihar, India
- Kaimur Wildlife Sanctuary, a wildlife refuge in the Kaimur Range of Bihar
- Kymore, a town and a nagar panchayat in Katni district in the Indian state of Madhya Pradesh
