= Karkat =

Karkat may refer to:

- Karkat, Afghanistan, a village in Afghanistan
- Karkat Vantas, a fictional character in the webcomic Homestuck
- Karkat Waterfall, a waterfall in Karkatgarh, Bihar, India
