= Kurasan =

Kurasan Kurāsan
- Village
- Location in Bihar, India Kurasan (India)
- Coordinates: 25.06333°N 83.56206°E
- Country: India
- State: Bihar
- District: Kaimur

Area
  - Total: 3.76 km^{2} (1.45 sq mi)
- Elevation: 86 m (282 ft)

Population (2011)
  - Total: 3,609
  - Density: 960/km^{2} (2,490/sq mi)

Languages
  - Official: Bhojpuri, Hindi
- Time zone: UTC+5:30 (IST)

Kurasan is a village in Bhabua block of Kaimur district, Bihar, India. As of 2011, its population was 3,609, in 606 households.
