= Sarangpur, Kaimur =

Sarangpur Sārangpur
- Village
- Location in Bihar, India Sarangpur (India)
- Coordinates: 25.03483°N 83.58332°E
- Country: India
- State: Bihar
- District: Kaimur

Area
  - Total: 1.81 km^{2} (0.70 sq mi)
- Elevation: 87 m (285 ft)

Population (2011)
  - Total: 1,641
  - Density: 907/km^{2} (2,350/sq mi)

Languages
  - Official: Bhojpuri, Hindi
- Time zone: UTC+5:30 (IST)

Sarangpur is a village in Bhabua block of Kaimur district, Bihar, India. As of 2011, its population was 1,641, in 269 households.
