= Chandesh =

- Village
- Location in Bihar, India Chandesh (India)
- Coordinates: 25.313280°N 83.792111°E
- Country: India
- State: Bihar
- District: Kaimur
- Elevation: 74 m (243 ft)

Languages
  - Official: Bhojpuri, Hindi
- Time zone: UTC+5:30 (IST)
- PIN: 802132
- Telephone code: 91-6184
- Vehicle registration: BR-45

Chandesh is large village in Nuaon block of Kaimur of Bihar in India. It belongs to the Patna division. It is located 48 km north of district headquarters Bhabua and 172 km from the state capital Patna. It has a population of 34,243 in 395 households. There are numerous general stores, medical, textile, electronic, grocery, and sweet shops. Almost all household things are available in the village bazaar. The village is administered by a panchayat. As of 2025, Jai Prakash Rai is the mukhia of this gram panchayat. The village has recently been awarded an elevated status of "Adarsh Gram" (model village) under Pradhan Mantri Adarsh Gram Yojana.

== Religion ==
Chandesh has a population with multiple religions. Sanatan Hinduism is the dominant religion with smaller but growing fraction of muslim population coexisting in the village. The village has multiple temples of Shiva, Vishnu, Hanuman, Kaali Maa, Gadhdevi Maa, Jauhar Maa, Sati Maa, shrines and a mosque.

== Agriculture ==
Agriculture is the main source of income and livelihood for the majority of the residents, although a number of people from this village have been in government and private sector jobs. Nearly all type of food grains which are cultivated in eastern UP are also produced here. Popular crops include wheat, paddy and potatoes, though other crops such as mustard, lentils, grams are also produced in large quantities. Irrigation is supplied by canal and tube wells.

== Infrastructure and transportation ==
The village has hundreds of tractors, and the common way to transport goods is by tractor trolleys. Lavish four-wheelers have come in recent years in large numbers as a common means of transportation for people. Four-wheelers ply to the near downtowns of Ramgarh, Buxar, Mohania, Bhabua and Kochas along with daily buses to Varanasi. Chandesh More is now an established and equipped transport depot on Sisaura-Mukhraon Road.

== River ==
River Goria flows from south towards the north in the west of the village and finally merges with River Durgavati which later merges with River Karmanasha.

== Tourist Destination ==
The village has many lakes around it. The Panchayat Sarkar Bhawan and the lake across it termed as Chandesh Gramin Tourist Place with paddle boats, walking paths, benches and rest area are novelties in the area.

== Gallery ==
Chandesh: Places, People, Activities & Festivals

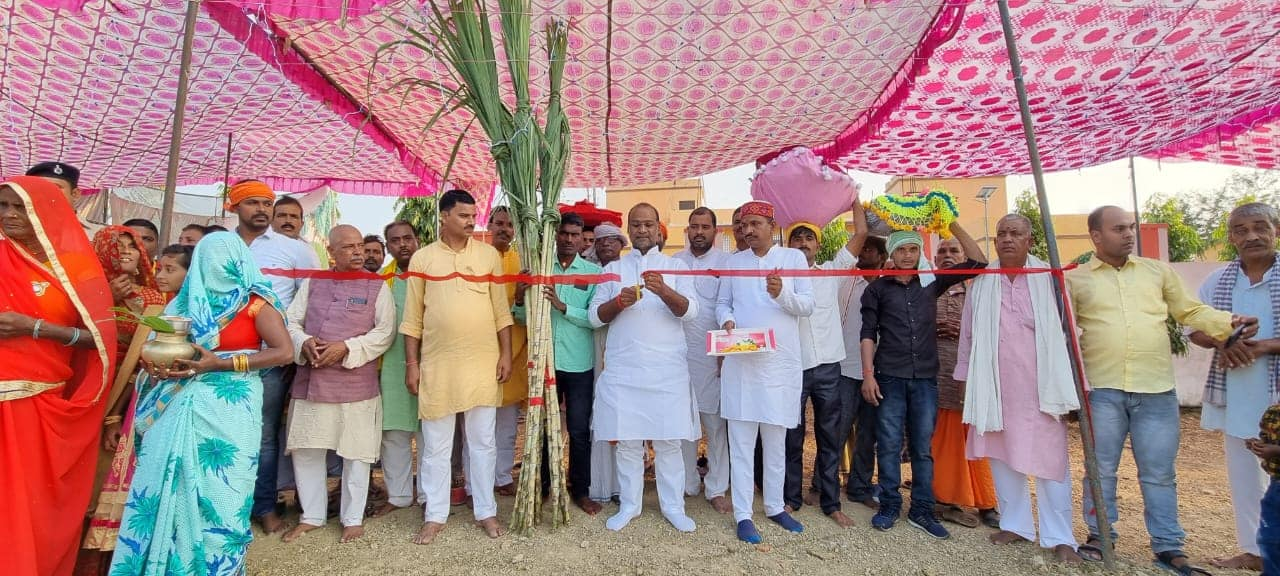

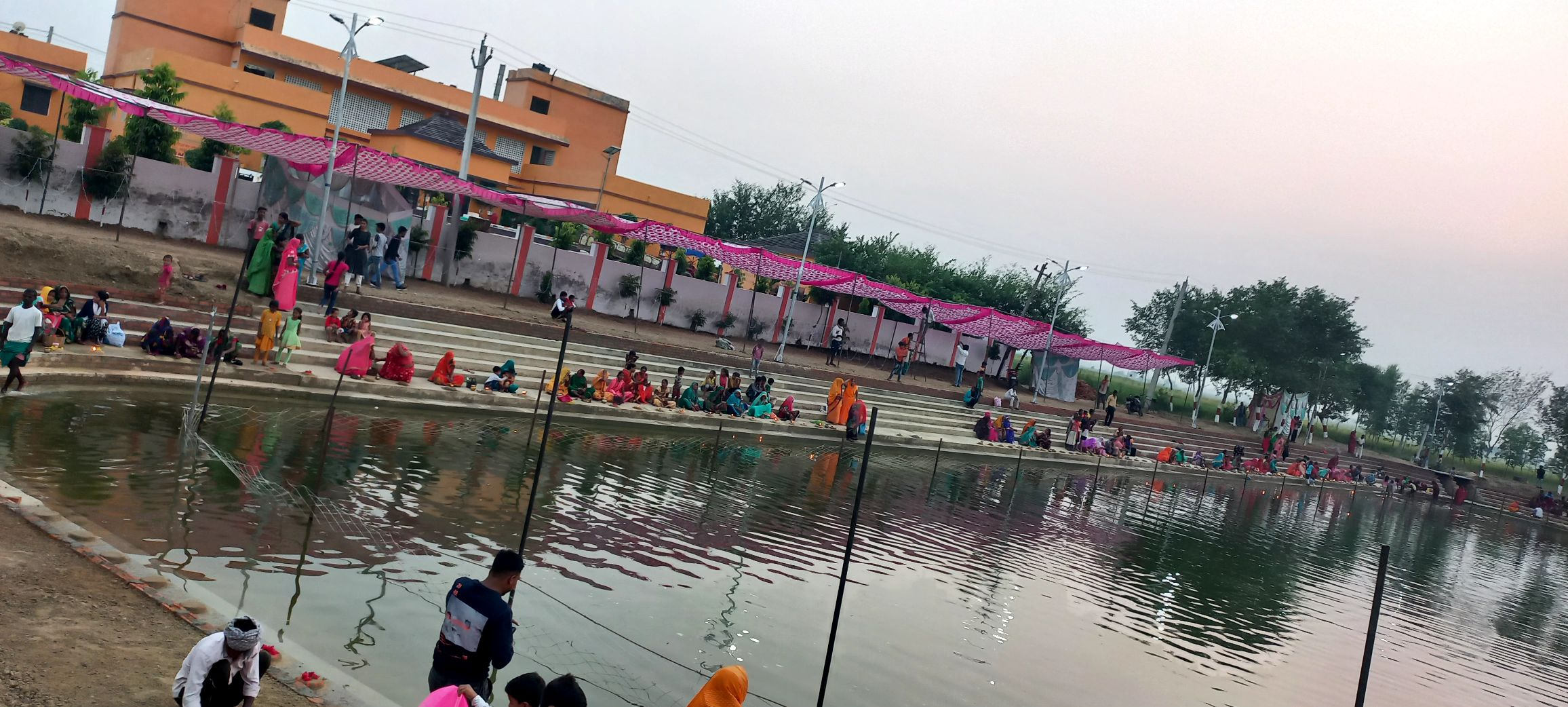

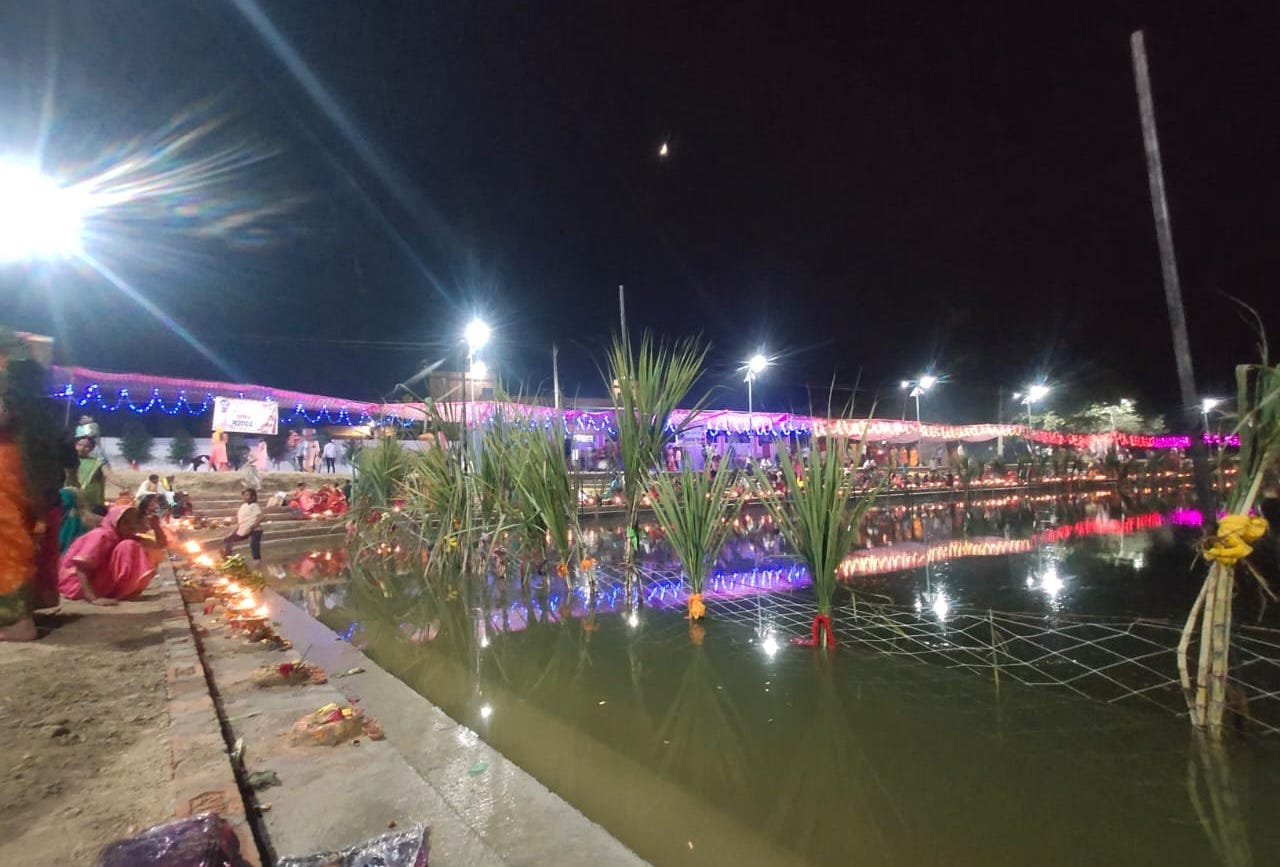

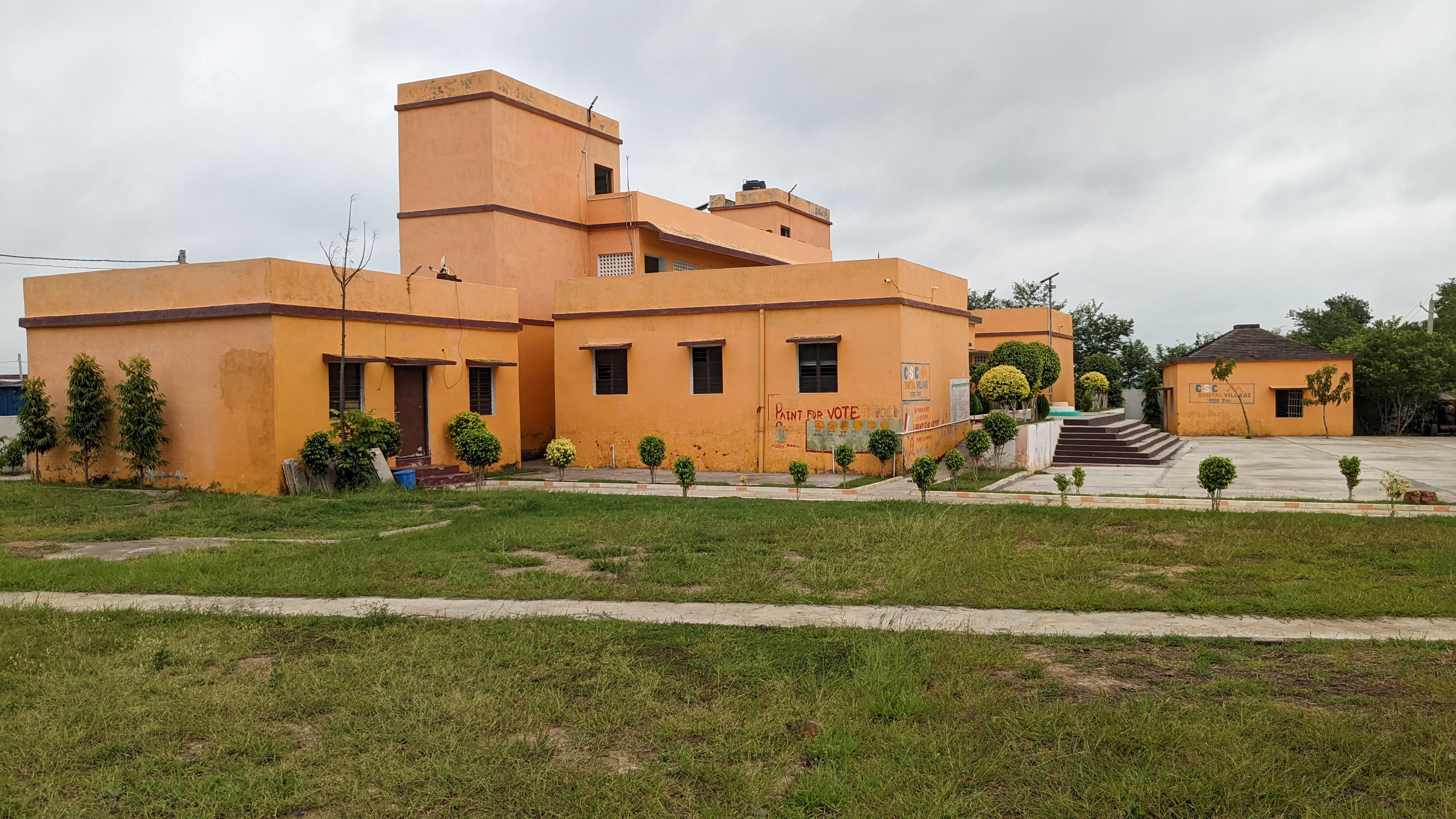

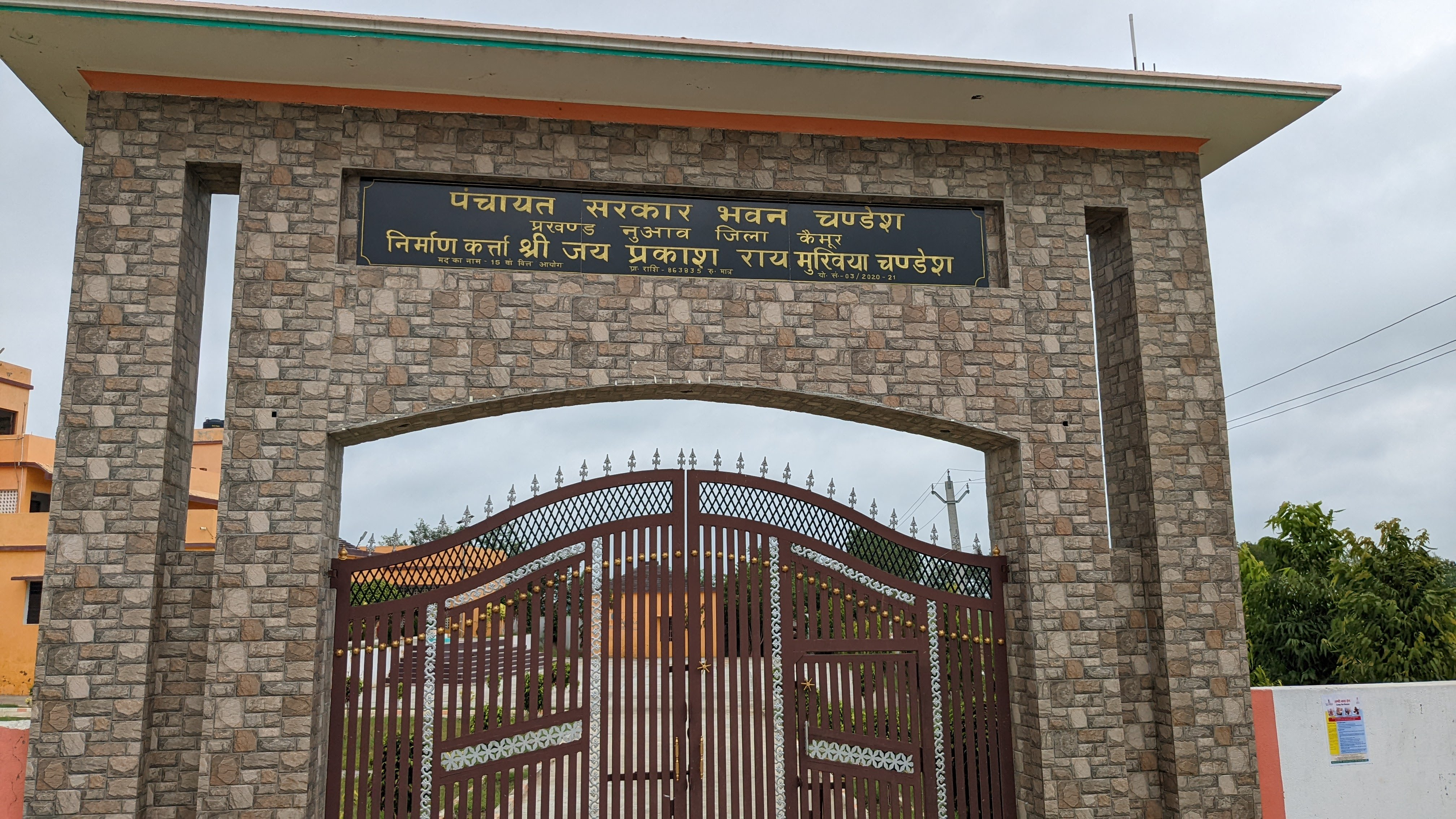

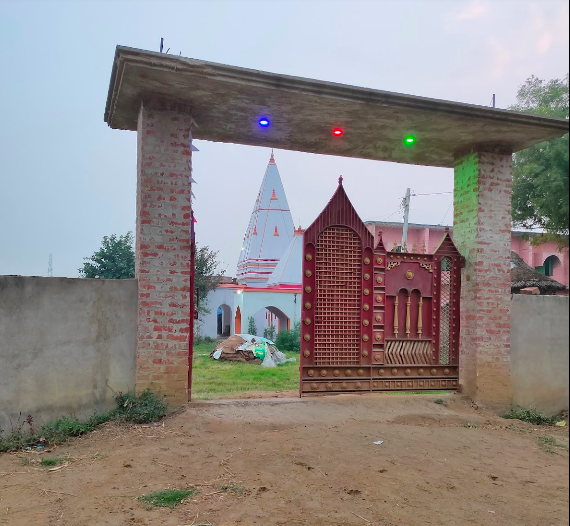

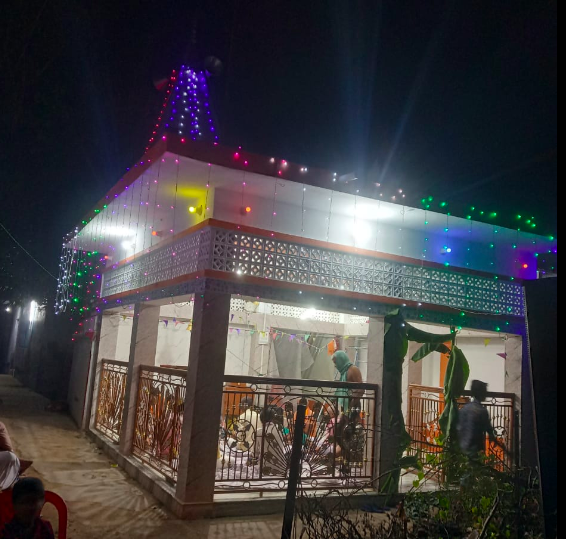

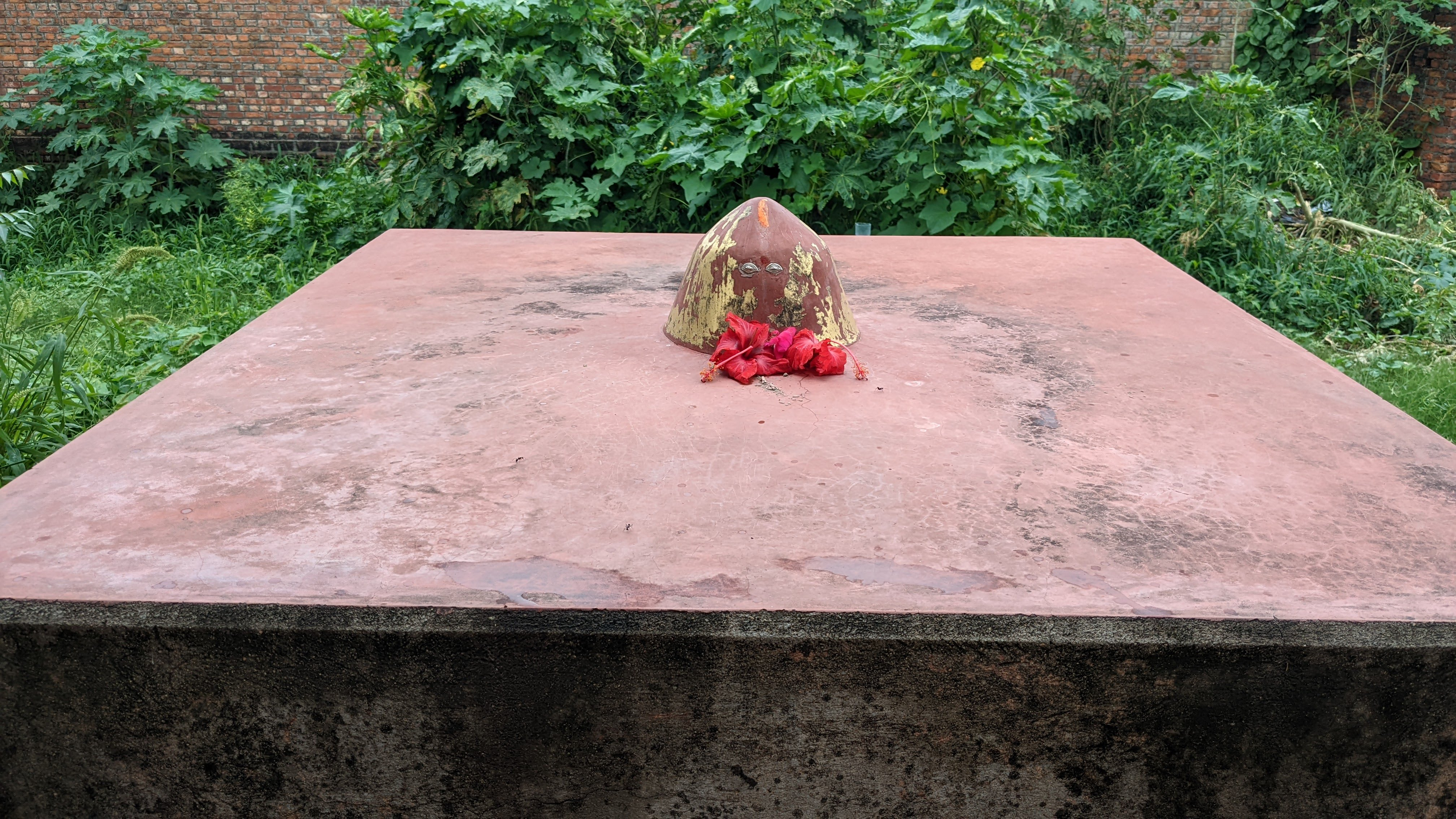

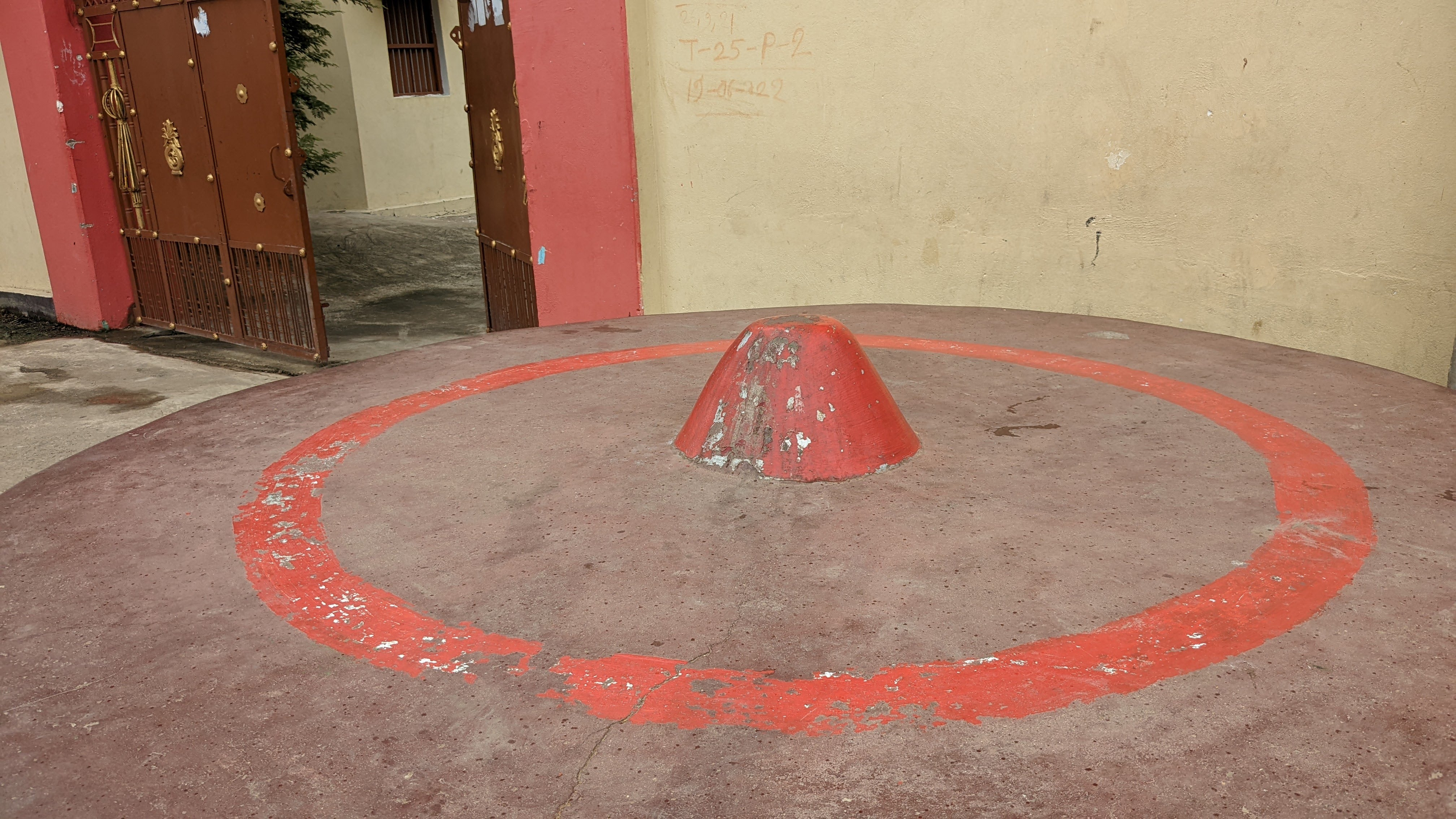

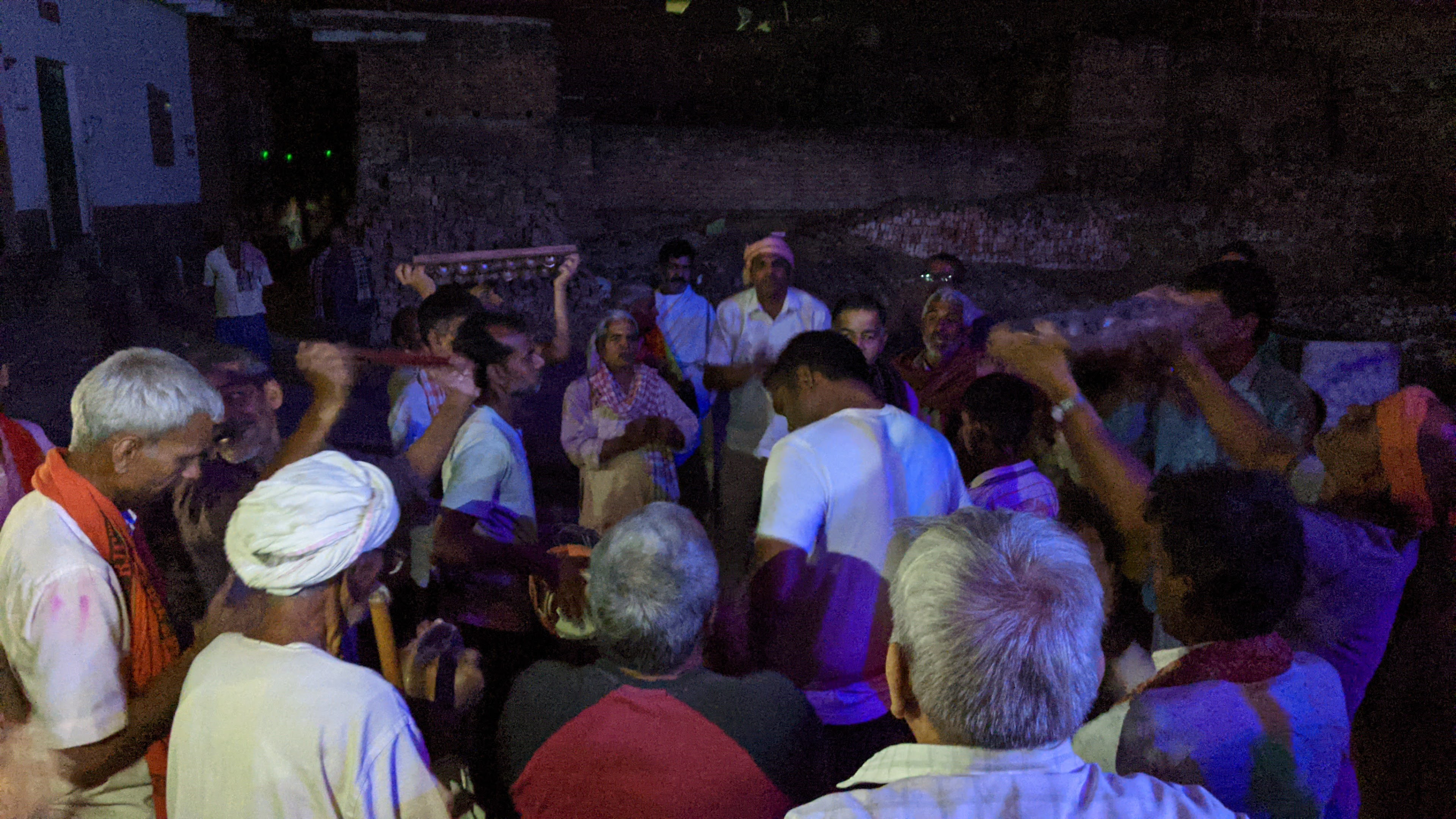

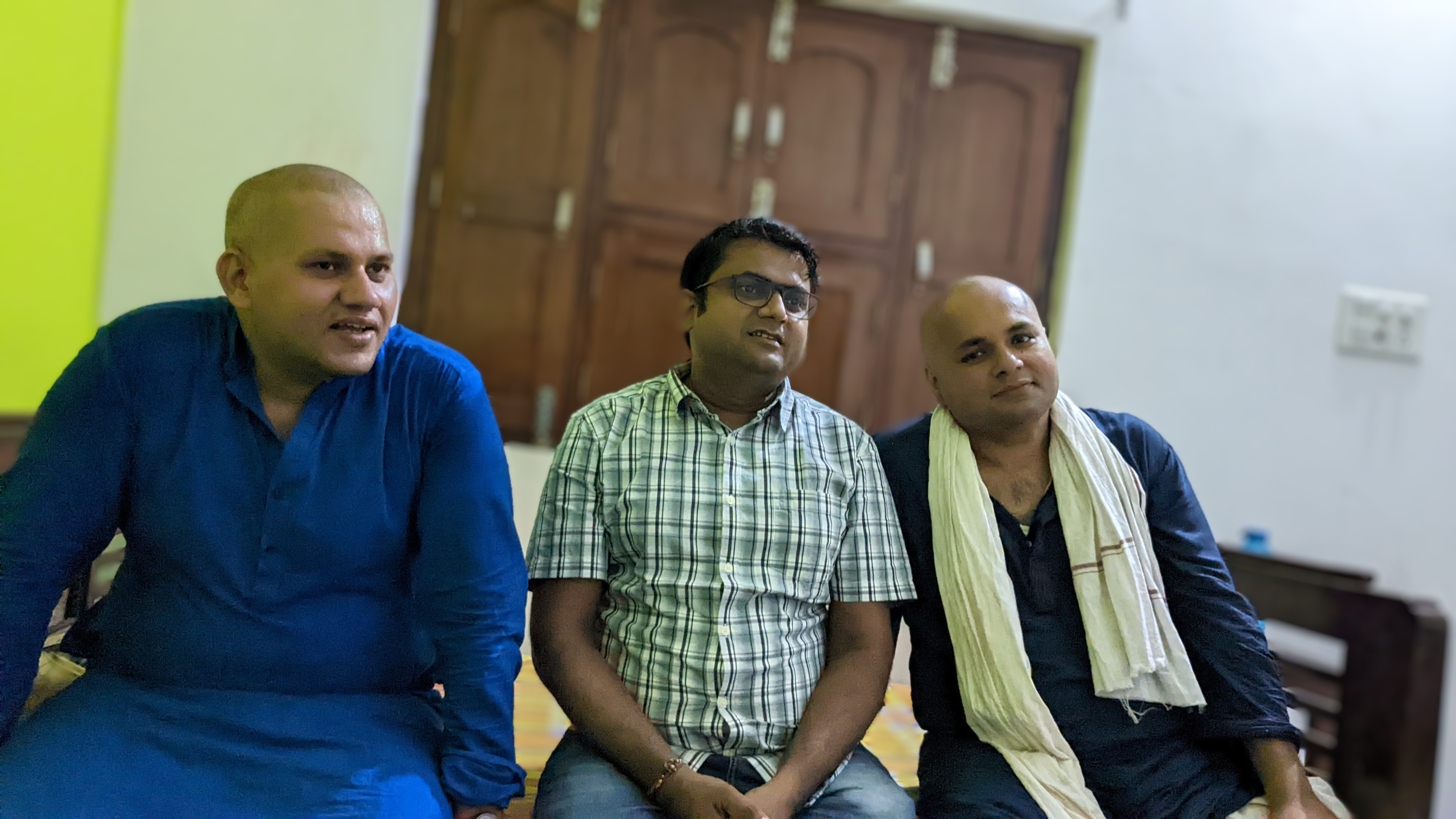

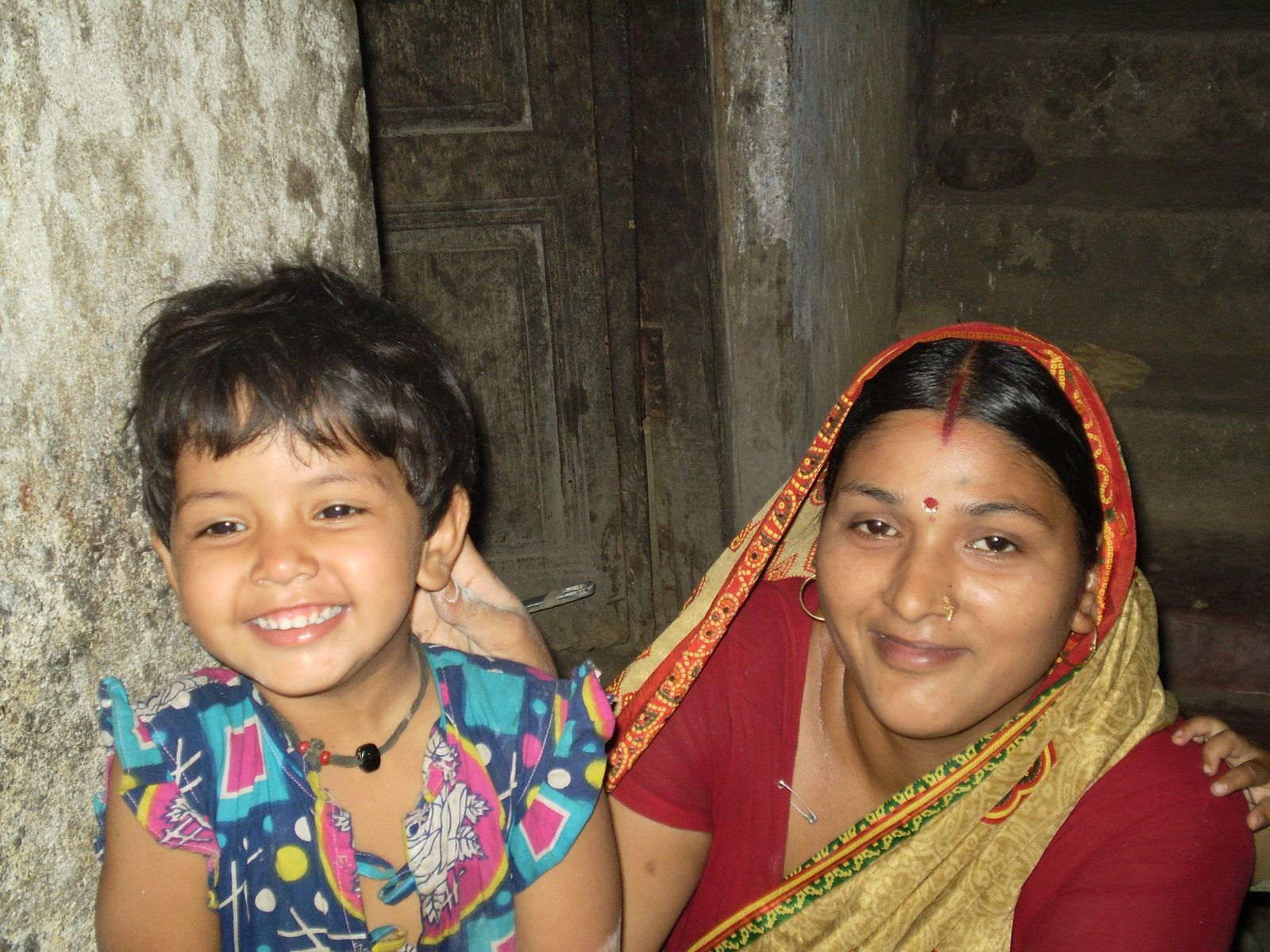

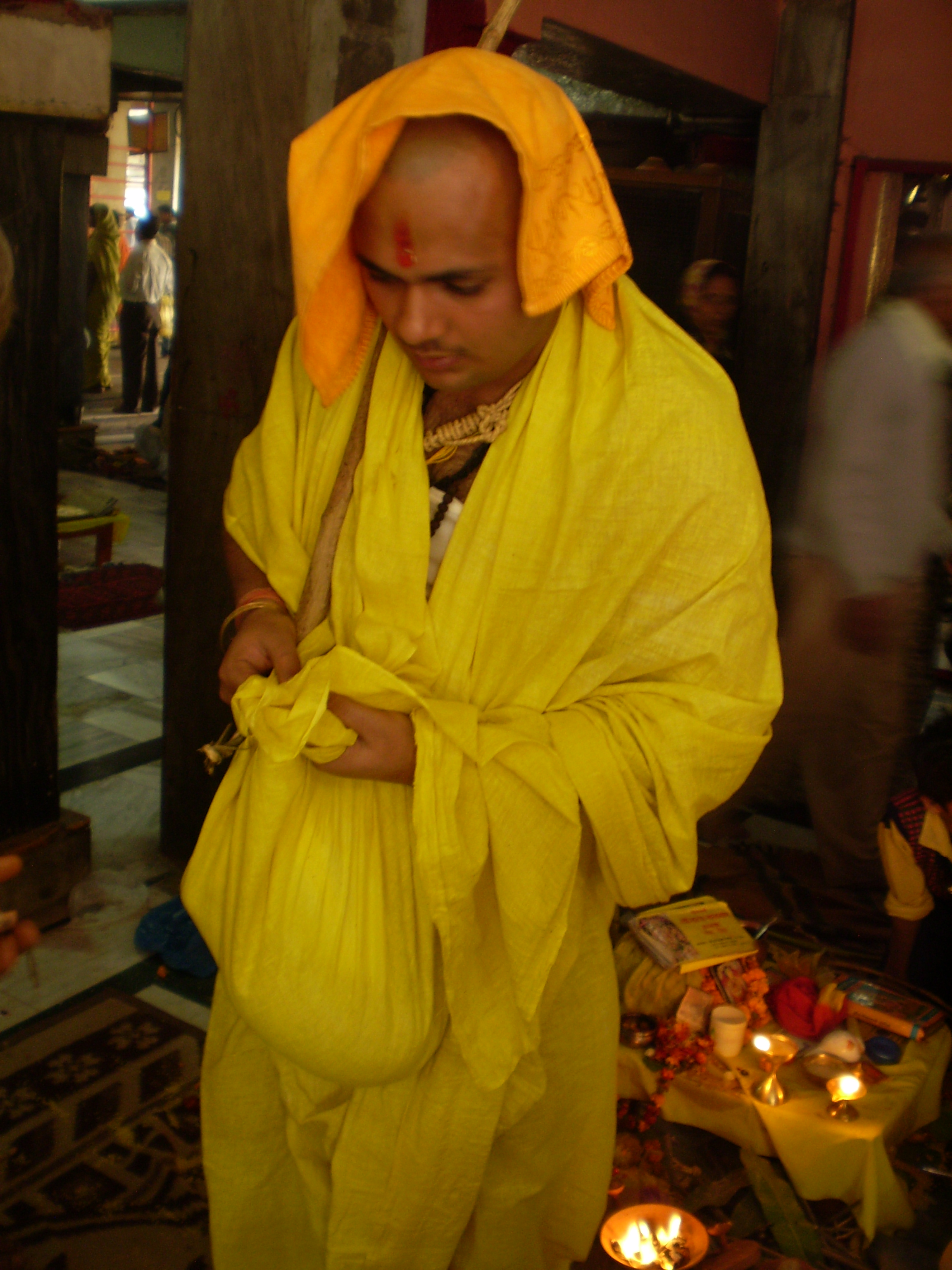

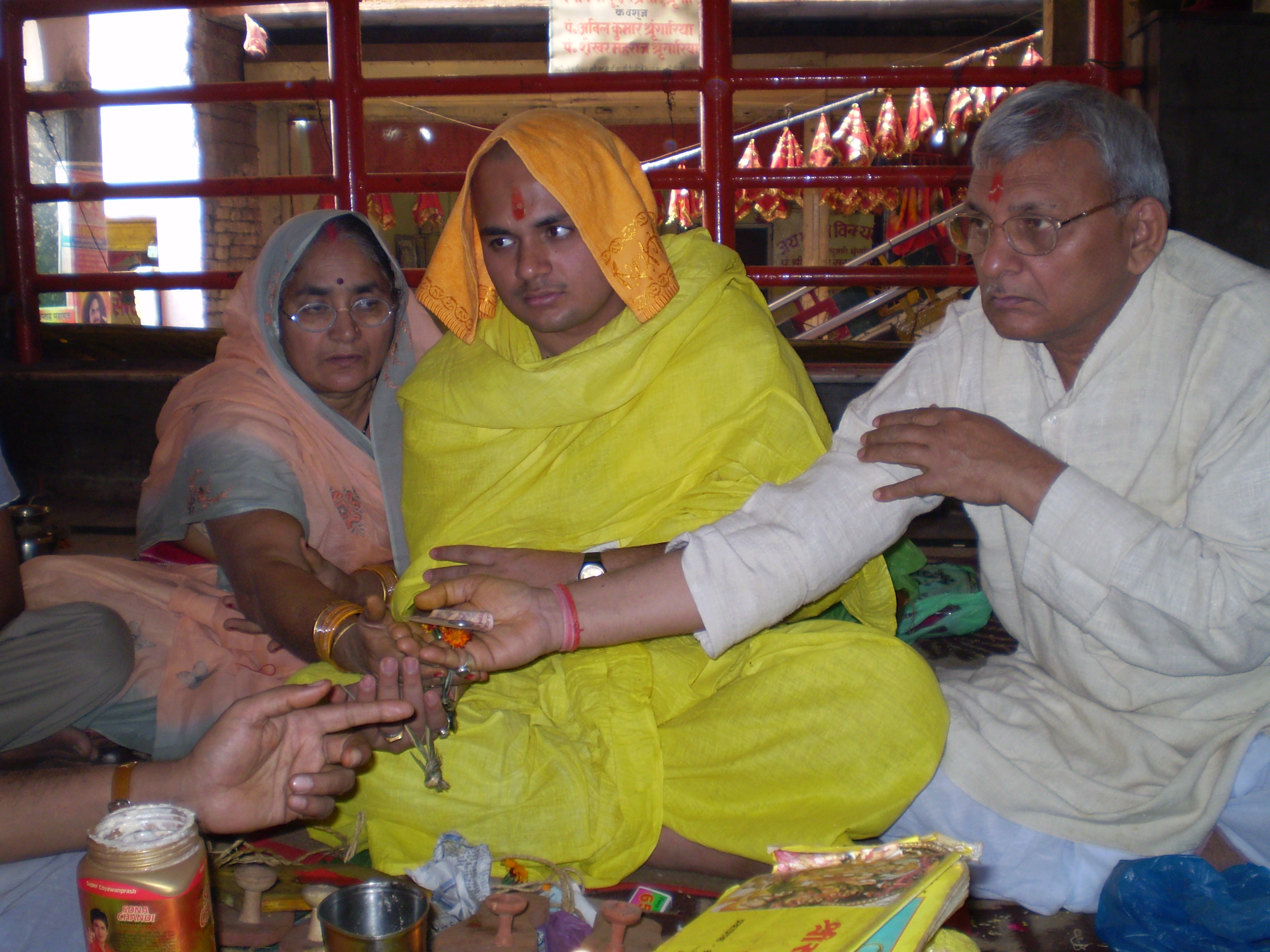

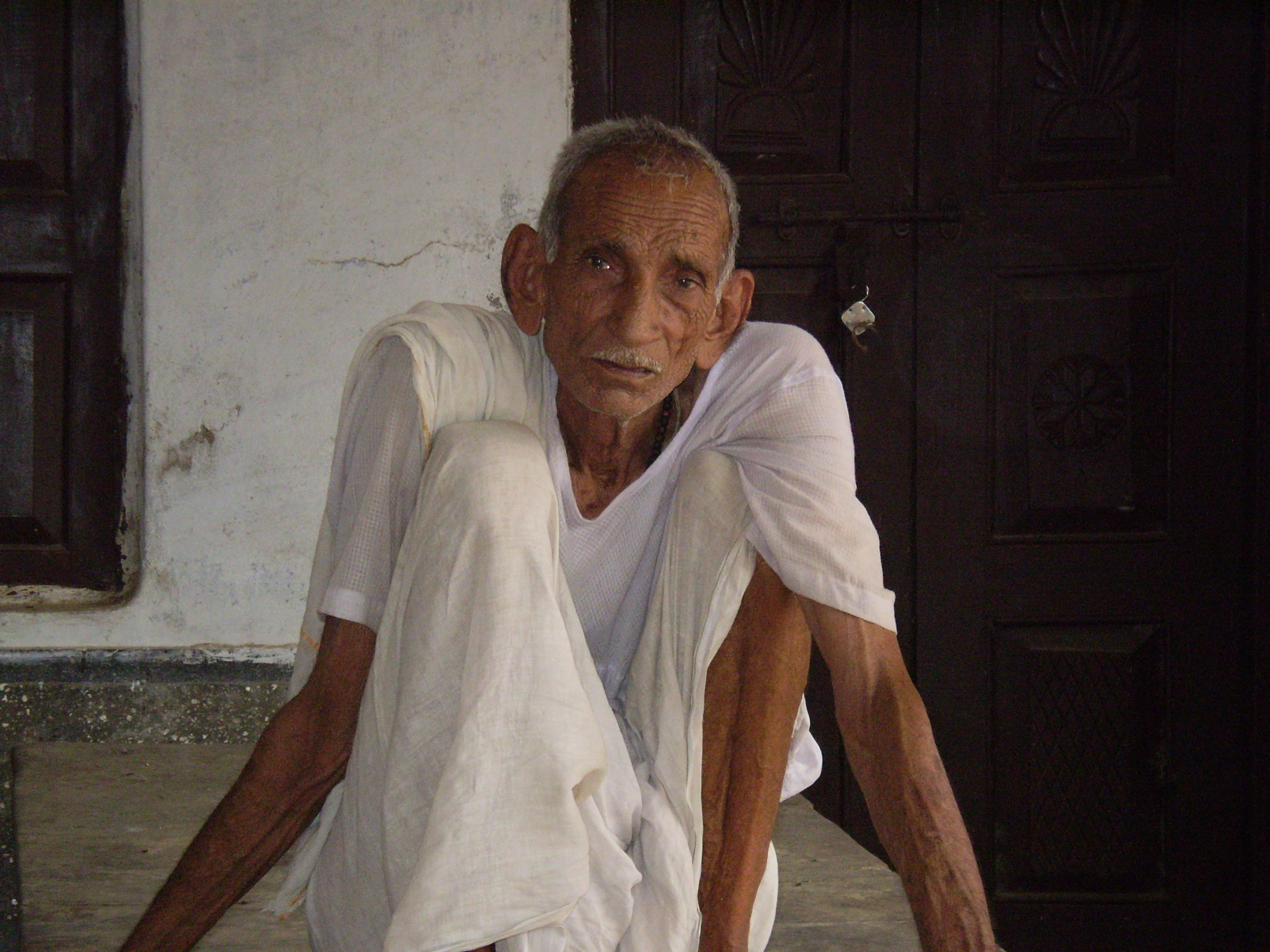

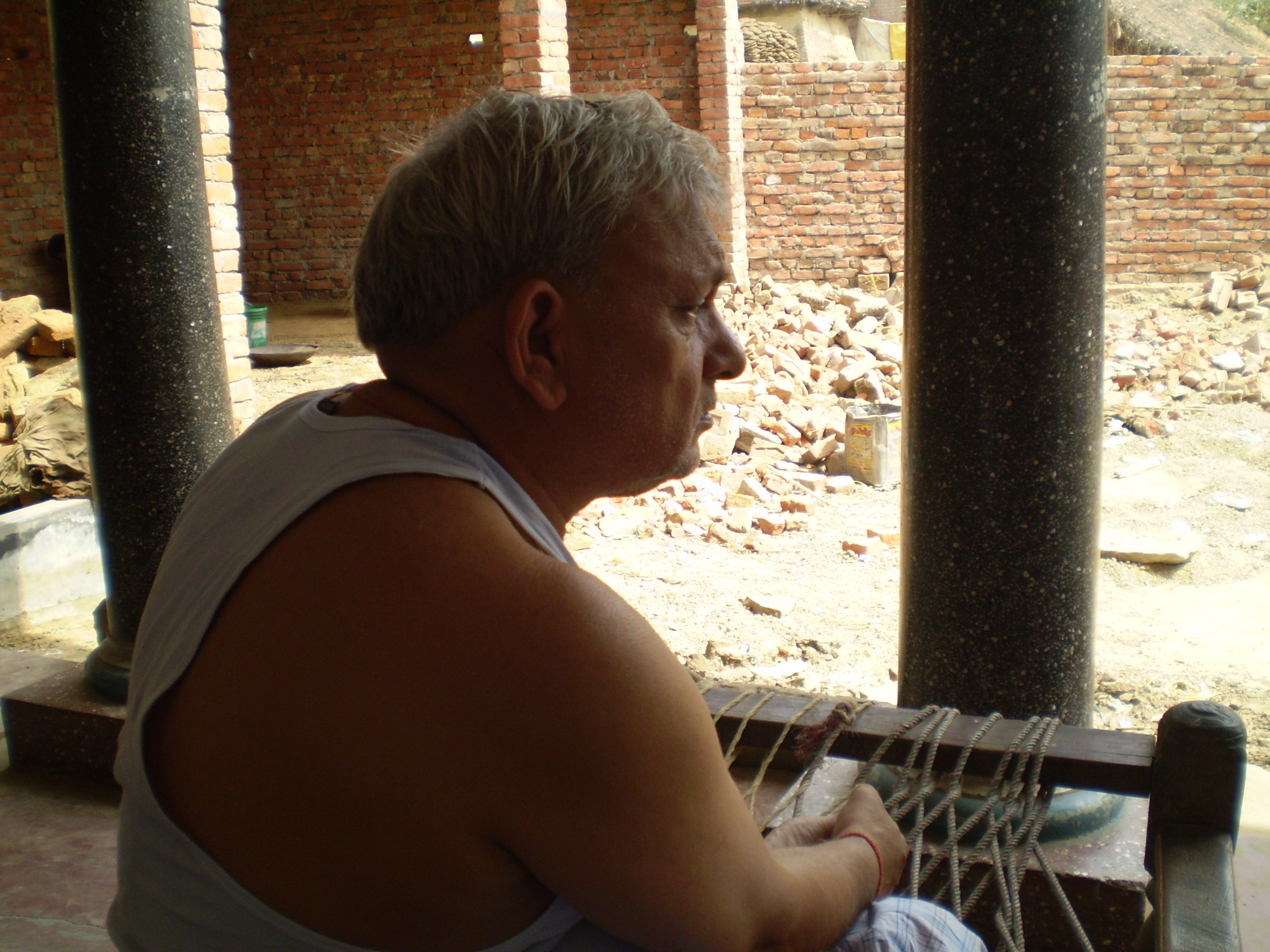

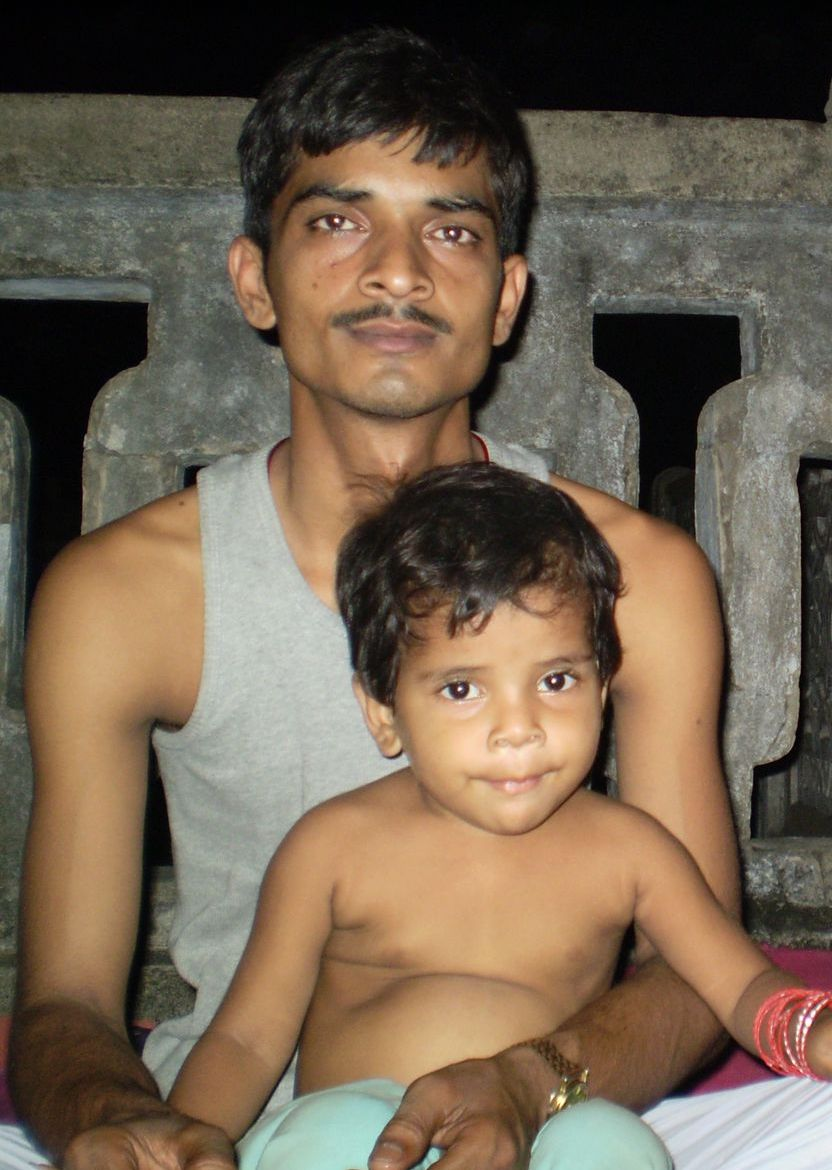

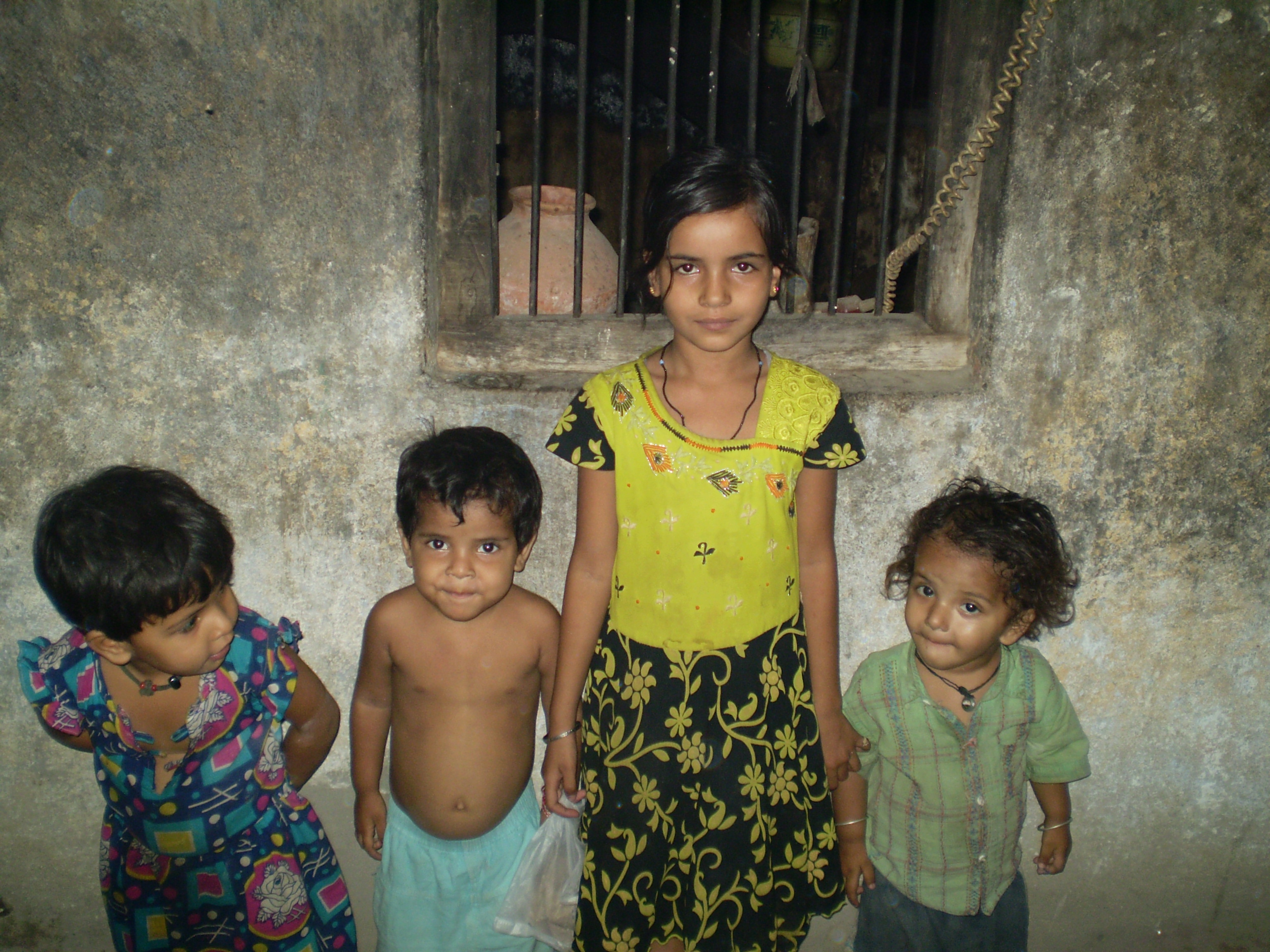

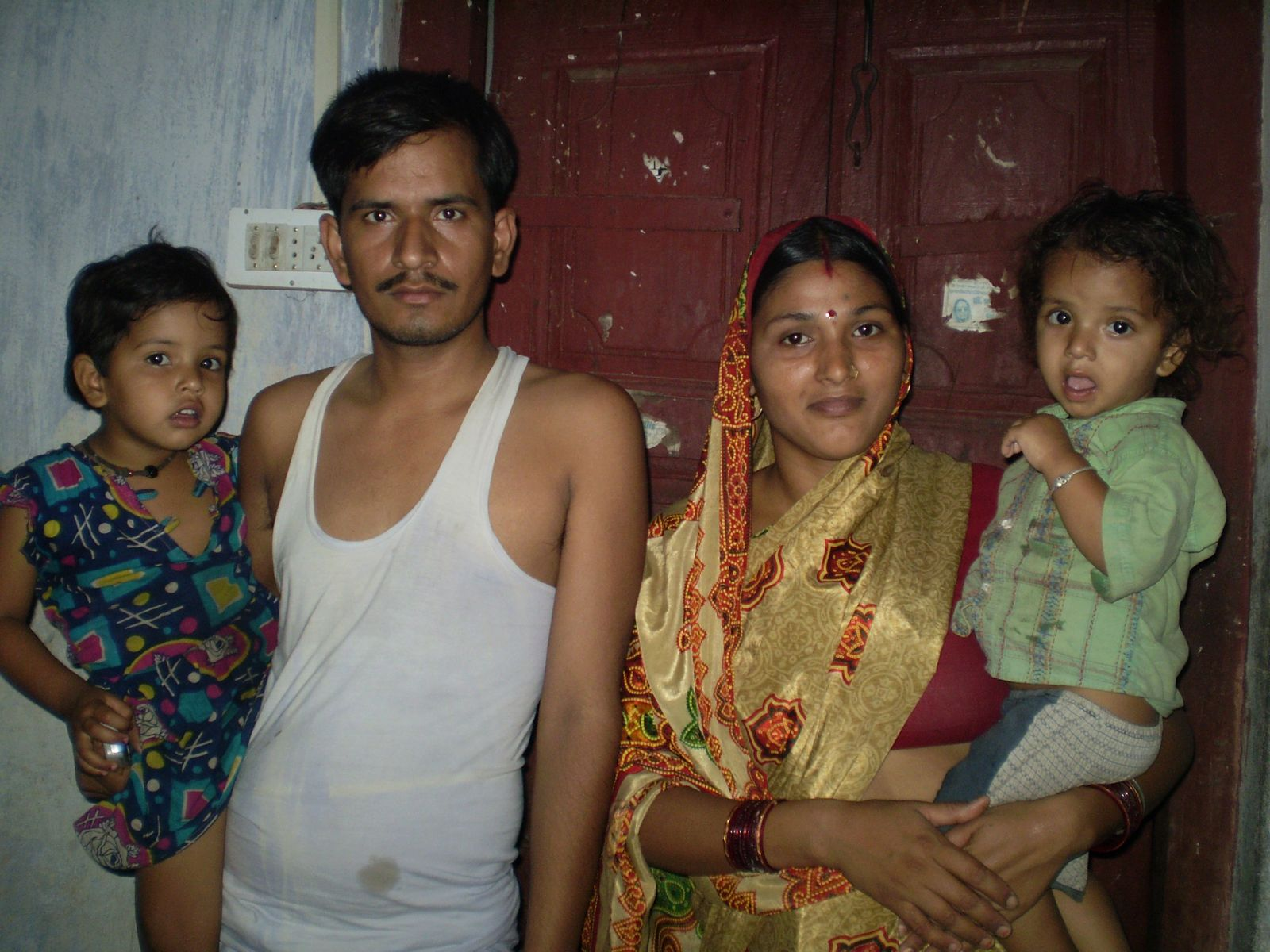
