= Sikthi =

- Village
- Location in Bihar, India Sikthi (India)
- Coordinates: 25.071°N 83.60457°E
- Country: India
- State: Bihar
- District: Kaimur

Area
  - Total: 3.56 km^{2} (1.37 sq mi)
- Elevation: 87 m (285 ft)

Population (2011)
  - Total: 3,985
  - Density: 1,120/km^{2} (2,900/sq mi)

Languages
  - Official: Bhojpuri, Hindi
- Time zone: UTC+5:30 (IST)

Sikthi is a village in Bhabua block of Kaimur district, Bihar, India. As of 2011, its population was 3,985, in 356 households.
