= Datiawan =

Datiyawan
- Village
- दतियाँव
- Location in Bihar, India Datiyawan (India)
- Coordinates: 25°03′17″N 83°34′46″E
- Country: India
- State: Bihar
- District: Kaimur

Area
  - Total: 2.52 km^{2} (0.97 sq mi)
- Elevation: 87 m (285 ft)

Population (2011)
  - Total: 2,702
  - Density: 1,070/km^{2} (2,780/sq mi)

Languages
  - Official: Bhojpuri, Hindi, English
- Time zone: UTC+5:30 (IST)
- PIN: 821101

Datiyawan (दतियाँव) is a village in Bhabua block of Kaimur district, Bihar, India. As of 2011, its population was 2,702, in 485 households.
