= Durgawati =

- Community development block
- Location in Bihar, India
- Coordinates: 25°12′41″N 83°31′51″E
- Country: India
- State: Bihar
- Division: Patna
- District: Kaimur (Bhabua)

Area
  - Total: 158.69 km^{2} (61.27 sq mi)
- Elevation: 76 m (249 ft)

Population (2011)
  - Total: 136,962
  - Density: 863.08/km^{2} (2,235.4/sq mi)

Languages
  - Official: Hindi
  - Regional: Bhojpuri
- Time zone: UTC+5:30 (IST)
- PIN: 821105
- Telephone code: 06187
- Vehicle registration: BR-45

Durgawati (also called Durgaoti or Durgauti) is a community development block in Kaimur district in Indian state of Bihar. It is geographically located between 25° 12' 41" north latitude and 83° 31' 51" east longitude. It is located at an altitude of 76 m (249 ft) above mean sea level. Its headquarters is 30.6 km by road north of the district headquarters, Bhabua, on National Highway 19 (old NH 2).

Durgawati is the hub of transport routes in Kaimur district, next to Mohania.

== Geography and climate ==
=== Geography ===
Durgawati has an average elevation of 76 metres (249 feet). Durgawati is divided into wards. In the south, there is a river called Durgauti which merges into the river Karamnasa. Durgawati is the hub of transport routes in Kaimur district, next to the city Mohania. The famous temple Mundeshawari Devi is situated in Kaimur district. The route for this temple goes through Durgawati. Public Transport or hired vehicles are available for the temple Mundeshwari Devi from the Bus stand on NH-19 or the railway station. There is a waterfall Telhar, approx 60 km in south.

=== Climate ===
Durgawati experiences a humid subtropical climate with large variations between summer and winter temperatures. The temperature ranges between 22 and 46 °C (72 and 115 °F) in the summers. Winters in Durgawati see very large diurnal variations, with warm days and downright cold nights. The dry summer starts in April and lasts until June, followed by the monsoon season from July to October. Very Cold waves from the Himalayan region cause temperatures to dip across the city in the winter from December to February and temperatures below 5 °C (41 °F) are not uncommon. Fog is common in the winters, while hot dry winds, called loo, blow in the summers. The average annual rainfall is 1,110 mm (44 in).

Climate data for Durgawati
Month	Jan	Feb	Mar	Apr	May	Jun	Jul	Aug	Sep	Oct	Nov	Dec	Year
Mean daily maximum °C (°F)	23 (74)	26.6 (79.8)	32.6 (90.7)	37.9 (100.2)	40.8 (105.5)	38.4 (101.2)	33.1 (91.6)	31.6 (88.9)	32 (90)	32.1 (89.7)	27.9 (82.3)	24.0 (75.2)	31.7 (89.1)
Mean daily minimum °C (°F)	18.7 (65.6)	8.6 (47.5)	11.0 (51.8)	21 (70)	25.5 (77.9)	26.8 (80.3)	25.2 (77.3)	24.6 (76.2)	23.6 (74.5)	19.7 (67.5)	14.3 (57.7)	9.0 (48.2)	19.0 (66.2)
Average precipitation mm (inches)	20.2 (0.80)	20.7 (0.81)	14.2 (0.56)	6.6 (0.26)	11.1 (0.44)	116.3 (4.58)	298.2 (11.74)	329 (13.0)	181.5 (7.15)	45.2 (1.78)	11.5 (0.45)	3.6 (0.14)	1,057.9 (41.65)

== Transport ==
Durgawati is well connected by air, rail and road with the major Indian cities like New Delhi, Mumbai, Kolkata, Chennai, Pune, Ahmedabad, Indore, Bhopal, Bhubaneswar, Gwalior, Jabalpur, Ujjain, Jaipur, Patna, Jamshedpur and Hyderabad. The town is 763 km from Delhi. One of the major factors in Durgawati's sustained existence as an inhabited city is its role as a transportation hub between different cities. It is a subdivisional town in Kaimur district. The district headquarters, Bhabua, is 30 km southward from the railway station.

=== Road ===
- National Highway 19 (old NH 2, GT Road) crosses through the heart of the town.

The town is 196 km from Patna and 50 km from Varanasi by road. There are also a few State Highways in the city SH-14.
Mohania is connected to Buxar via Ramgarh from the south and with Bhabua (district capital, Audhaura, Bhagwanpur) from the south.

=== Railway ===
The name of the railway station of Durgawati is Durgauti railway station, situated on Howrah–Gaya–Mughalsarai–New Delhi Grand Chord line. Dindayal Pandey and Sumit Pandey always demands for development of this station. They demands for stoppage of new train here. The station code is " DGO".

=== Airport ===
Lal Bahadur Shastri International Airport, Varanasi, commonly known as Babatpur Airport, is the nearest airport, 67 km from Durgawati. Indian carriers, including Air India and Spicejet and international carriers like Air India, Thai Airways International, Korean Air and Naaz Airlines, operate from here.

== Other ==
=== School ===
- Inter Level High School ( Kanya Madhya Vidyalaya )
- Children's Academy
- St. John's School
- Saraswati Sisu Mandir

=== Bank ===
- Allahabad Bank
- Madhya Bihar Gramin Bank
- Co-operative Bank
- Sahara India Bank
- State Bank of India
- HDFC Bank
- Union Bank of India
- Bank of Baroda
- Punjab National Bank
- Axis Bank ATM

== Villages ==
Durgawati block contains the following 108 villages:

Village name	Total land area (hectares)	Population (in 2011)
Jamurni	194	1,439
Kulharia	424	2,367
Larma	201	938
Chhajupur	79	200
Chipali	70	401
Keshopur	82	255
Khajura	376	6,061
Basawanpur	35	19
Niazpur	87	377
Khajura Arazi	29	0
Bhagwanpur	147	66
Sakhelipur	58	467
Dhan Saray	108	905
Pipari	121	540
Dharhar	344	1,535
Kanhpur	75	904
Bilkhori	100	433
Harpur Pokhar	66	0
Baruri	360	1,681
Harballabhpur	91	655
Chhawan	280	2,105
Dharahra	57	0
Pokhra	57	0
Kurari	504	1,907
Bhanpur	127	1,094
Bheria	477	1,974
Raghunathpur	50	204
Madhura	65	740
Shohpur	128	764
Shudhia	142	488
Manipur	30	236
Ruia	195	600
Ishipur	137	673
Gorar	199	1,515
Machhanhata	180	613
Gosaisipur	74	523
Kusharia	182	772
Isari	297	1,257
Ashoga	170	1,301
Manikpur Doghara	38	485
Machkhia	146	1,377
Madhopur	88	1,007
Dhanipur	69	389
Sariawan	89	2,046
Khamdaura	369	3,320
Kharkholi	139	947
Bhadaini	39	437
Anantpur	49	0
Amirti	105	39
Kharsara	193	3,332
Dhanichha	230	3,052
Dharhara	164	1,058
Rohua	89	1,270
Manoharpur	359	522
Chahria	0 (sic)	5,211
Itahi	96	1,018
Kotsa	348	2,767
Dusaunti	43	926
Chhata	371	3,373
Madanpura	54	0
Madanpura	37	774
Karari	505	3,645
Belhari	73	0
Panrepur	33	0
Jevari	223	2,608
Pachilakhi	295	1,664
Bichhiya	119	2,111
Asurha	30	423
Tola Gopinathpur	47	270
Ataria	96	966
Arazi Kalyanpur	62	0
Misirpura	30	1,012
Kalhnuan	241	1,217
Kalyanpur	180	3,709
Tiari	38	7
Serwan	57	0
Mansurpur	128	2,231
Kasthar	76	126
Kirpalpur	66	834
Dumri	260	4,158
Ghinhu Patti	106	1,440
Nuawan	394	3,216
Garhwa	51	375
Masaurha	712	5,720
Kabilaspur	197	1,835
Firozpur	96	1,336
Gimhiyan	85	310
Dakaha	28	0
Kasthari	134	2,297
Karmi	58	0
Udhpura	124	466
Narsingha	58	0
Garhwa	38	0
Sawath	470	5,164
Dahiyawan	160	1,258
Darauli	113	1,232
Dahla	93	3,816
Chogara	127	1,172
Janarjanpur	36	1,795
Panrepur	29	174
Anwarhiya	484	2,874
Sonawan	91	721
Sarangpur	115	1,294
Karanpura	508	4,623
Dirkhili	209	1,504
Shahpur	56	0
Lain	62	0
Sawath	60	0
