= Ikhlaspur =

Ikhlaspur Akhlashpur
- Village
- Location in Bihar, India Ikhlaspur (India)
- Coordinates: 25.0589°N 83.60828°E
- Country: India
- State: Bihar
- District: Kaimur
- Established: 1620
- Founder: Akhlash Khan

Area
  - Total: 4.39 km^{2} (1.69 sq mi)
- Elevation: 89 m (292 ft)

Population (2011)
  - Total: 11,820
  - Density: 2,690/km^{2} (6,970/sq mi)

Languages
  - Official: Bhojpuri, Hindi
- Time zone: UTC+5:30 (IST)

Ikhlaspur is a large village in Bhabua block of Kaimur district, Bihar, India. As of 2011, its population was 11,820, in 2,042 households. It covers an area of 439 hectares, of which 401.7 were used for farmland.

== History ==
Akhlash pur, was originally established by Akhlash Khan a Jagirdar of the Pargana and Subahdar of Bihar during Jahangir &Shahjahan, He appointed Malik Wishal Khan of, Chainpur as the Faujdar of Rohtas garh, fort, where as he was a Kiladar. The place, was originally a garh of Sakarwar Rajput who were the descendants of Diwan Rao of Gahmar a son of, Raja Dham Dev Rao, a Sakarwar ruler, whose family came in the vicinity of Ghazipur and Kaimur during, 1530, as their kingdoms where attacked by, Babur. Diwan Rao's descendants established the old city of Bhabua, while Akhlash Khan, a native and friend of their family established the village of Akhlashpur during the rule of Shahjahan, while many of his descendants established the nearby village of Sighthi. Akhlash Khan's family had good relations with the zamindar families of Chainpur, Bhabua, and Dildarnagar Kamsar, leading to many of their descendants settling in Akhlashpur.
