= Parei =

- Village
- Location in Bihar, India Parei (India)
- Coordinates: 25.11254°N 83.3717°E
- Country: India
- State: Bihar
- District: Kaimur

Area
  - Total: 0.91 km^{2} (0.35 sq mi)
- Elevation: 78 m (256 ft)

Population (2011)
  - Total: 0
  - Density: 0.0/km^{2} (0.0/sq mi)

Languages
  - Official: Bhojpuri, Hindi
- Time zone: UTC+5:30 (IST)

Parei is a village in Chand block of Kaimur district, Bihar, India. As of 2011, the village was uninhabited, although its land was used for agricultural purposes. It covered an area of 91 hectares, of which 75 were in cultivation at the time and another 8.2 were fallow lands.
