= Panrepur, Chand =

Panrepur Pānrepur
- Village
- Location in Bihar, India Panrepur (India)
- Coordinates: 25.10439°N 83.38151°E
- Country: India
- State: Bihar
- District: Kaimur

Area
  - Total: 0.80 km^{2} (0.31 sq mi)
- Elevation: 79 m (259 ft)

Population (2011)
  - Total: 0
  - Density: 0.0/km^{2} (0.0/sq mi)

Languages
  - Official: Bhojpuri, Hindi
- Time zone: UTC+5:30 (IST)

Panrepur is a village in Chand block of Kaimur district, Bihar, India. As of 2011, the village was uninhabited, although its land was used for agricultural purposes. It covered an area of 80 hectares, of which 68 were in cultivation at the time and another 9.8 were fallow lands.
