= Parhi, Kaimur =

Parhi Pārhi
- Village
- Location in Bihar, India Parhi (India)
- Coordinates: 25.09978°N 83.38443°E
- Country: India
- State: Bihar
- District: Kaimur

Area
  - Total: 4.12 km^{2} (1.59 sq mi)
- Elevation: 87 m (285 ft)

Population (2011)
  - Total: 2,673
  - Density: 649/km^{2} (1,680/sq mi)

Languages
  - Official: Bhojpuri, Hindi
- Time zone: UTC+5:30 (IST)

Parhi is a village in Chand block of Kaimur district, Bihar, India. As of 2011, its population was 2,673, in 421 households.
