= Kaimur Wildlife Sanctuary =

Wildlife sanctuary in India

- IUCN category IV (habitat/species management area)
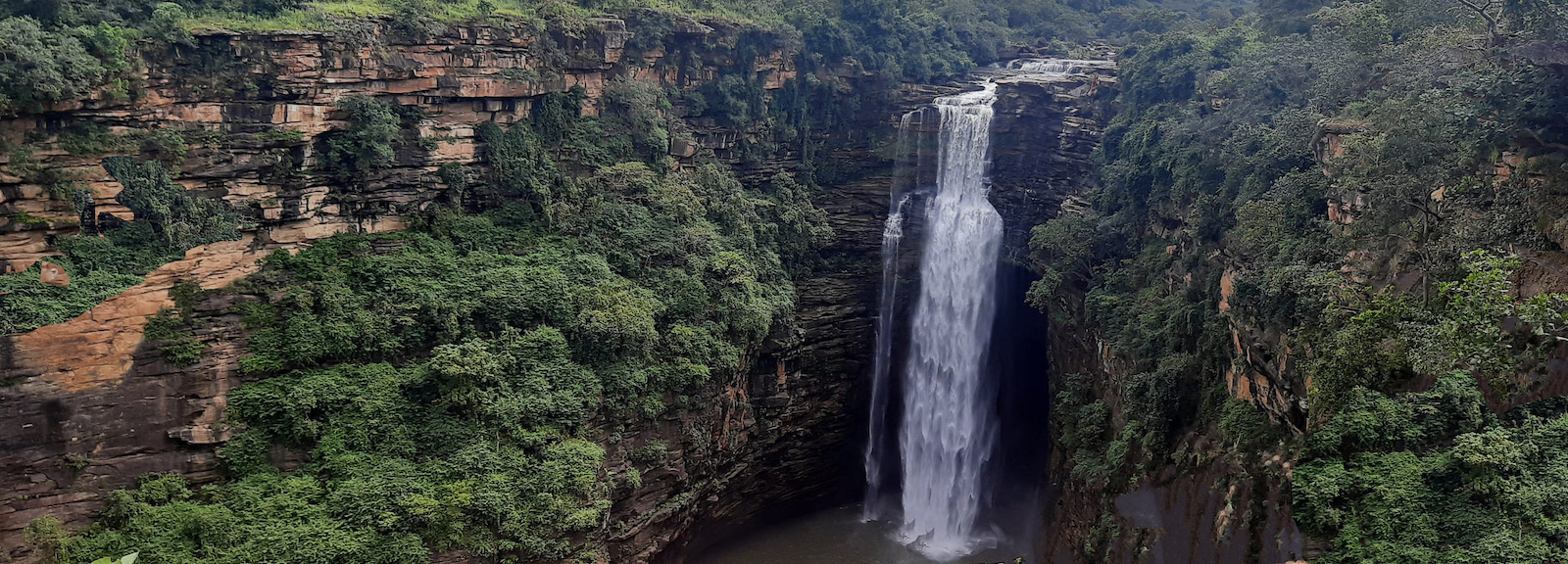

- Location within Bihar Location within India
- Interactive map of Kaimur Wildlife Sanctuary
- Location: Kaimur district and Rohtas district of Bihar, India
- Nearest city: Bhabua and Sasaram
- Coordinates: 25.05°N 83.50°E
- Area: 1,504.96 km^{2} (581.07 sq mi)
- Established: 1979

Kaimur Wildlife Sanctuary is situated in Kaimur District and Rohtas District of Bihar. It is the largest sanctuary in the state and extended in area of 1,504.96 km^{2} (581.07 sq mi) in plateaued landscape of Kaimur Range. It was established in 1979. The major forest types are Tropical Dry Mixed Deciduous, Dry Sal Forests, Boswellia Forests and Dry Bamboo Brakes. It is home to rare and endangered flora and fauna. Rohtasgarh Fort and Shergarh Fort are also located in these forests. It also has numerous Megaliths, Rock painting of prehistoric age and stone inscription from a bygone era. The Government of Bihar has planned to developed it into Tiger Reserve.

== Geography ==
This Wildlife Sanctuary is located in Rohtas Plateau and Kaimur plateau of Kaimur Range in the south-western part of Bihar. In the valley portions there are several waterfalls of which the finest are Karkat Waterfall, Manjhar Kund, Dhua Kund, Tutla Bhawani waterfall, Geeta ghat waterfall, Kashish Waterfall, and Telhar. There are several Dams and lakes, including Anupam Lake, Karamchat dam and Kohira Dam.

== Climate ==
Nature has endowed Kaimur Wildlife Sanctuary with many seasonal streams. During the monsoon season, the jungle becomes resplendent with greenery. The best time to visit is during monsoon and winter season.

== Fauna ==
The main animals found at Kaimur Wildlife Sanctuary are Bengal tigers, Indian leopards, Indian boars, Indian pangolins, sloth bears, sambar deers, Indian muntjacs, Four-horned antelopes, chitals, nilgais and various species of reptiles, insects and butterflies. It is home to more than 70 species of resident birds, which stay here all year around. The number increases in the migratory season i.e. during the winters, when there is an influx of birds from the Central Asian region.

Common birds species are peafowl, grey partridge, quail, Malabar, pied hornbill, swallow, nightjar, drongo, paradise flycatcher, kingfisher, bulbul, mynas, pigeon, wood pigeon, blue jay, owl, falcon, kites, eastern imperial eagle, greater spotted eagle, white-tailed eagle, Pallas's fish eagle, grey-headed fish eagle, and the lesser kestrel and vultures.

Birds such as the lesser white-fronted goose, ferruginous duck, Baer's pochard duck and lesser adjutant, greater adjutant, black-necked stork, and Asian openbill stork migrate from Central Asia to the park during winter.

Fishes are found in Anupam Lake and Kalidah near Rameshwar kund. Among snakes, cobra and kraits are of common occurrence while pythons are occasionally seen.

== Administration ==
Administered under forest division of Kaimur district and Rohtas district. The villagers are mainly engaged in the field of agriculture.

== Transport ==
By road from Sasaram and Bhabua. Nearest railway station to Kaimur Wildlife Sanctuary are Bhabua Road railway station and Sasaram railway station on the Howrah-New Delhi Grand chord line.

== See also ==
- Protected areas of Bihar
- Fauna of Bihar
- Flora of Bihar
