= Konahra =

- Village
- Location in Bihar, India Konahra (India)
- Coordinates: 25.09747°N 83.40023°E
- Country: India
- State: Bihar
- District: Kaimur

Area
  - Total: 1.57 km^{2} (0.61 sq mi)
- Elevation: 83 m (272 ft)

Population (2011)
  - Total: 806
  - Density: 513/km^{2} (1,330/sq mi)

Languages
  - Official: Bhojpuri, Hindi
- Time zone: UTC+5:30 (IST)

Konahra is a village in Chand block of Kaimur district, Bihar, India. As of 2011, its population was 806, in 157 households.
