= Majhgawan, Kaimur =

Majhgawan Majhgāwān
- Village
- Location in Bihar, India Majhgawan (India)
- Coordinates: 25.1265°N 83.38484°E
- Country: India
- State: Bihar
- District: Kaimur

Area
  - Total: 0.46 km^{2} (0.18 sq mi)
- Elevation: 78 m (256 ft)

Population (2011)
  - Total: 0
  - Density: 0.0/km^{2} (0.0/sq mi)

Languages
  - Official: Bhojpuri, Hindi
- Time zone: UTC+5:30 (IST)

Majhgawan is a village in Chand block of Kaimur district, Bihar, India. As of 2011, the village was uninhabited, although its land was used for agricultural purposes. It covered an area of 46 hectares, of which 35 were in cultivation at the time.
