= Majhgain =

Majhgain Majhgāin
- Village
- Location in Bihar, India Majhgain (India)
- Coordinates: 25.13192°N 83.38555°E
- Country: India
- State: Bihar
- District: Kaimur

Area
  - Total: 0.82 km^{2} (0.32 sq mi)
- Elevation: 81 m (266 ft)

Population (2011)
  - Total: 243
  - Density: 300/km^{2} (770/sq mi)

Languages
  - Official: Bhojpuri, Hindi
- Time zone: UTC+5:30 (IST)

Majhgain is a village in Chand block of Amarpur Banka district, Bihar, India. As of 2011, its population was 700, in 100 households.
