= Karundia -ilia =

Karundia Karundia -Ilia -Tazia mela
- Village
- Country: India
- State: Bihar
- District: Kaimur
- Elevation: 74 m (243 ft)

Languages
  - Official: Bhojpuri, Hindi
- Time zone: UTC+5:30 (IST)

Karundia is a large village in the Chand block of Kaimur of Bihar in India. It belongs to the Patna Division. It is located 30 km towards west from the district headquarters of Bhabua and is located at a distance of 172 km from the state capital Patna.

Karundia is famous for annual kali Pooja &Tazia (fair) mela.

== History ==
Karundia was a part of the Rohitash district before 1991. Karundia is a border of kaimur district of Bihar and Uttar chandauli district of uttar Pradesh. This village belongs to the kargil martyred Saheed kamaludin.

== Economy ==
70% population are based on an agricultural income, 10% of the population are based on small scale business, and 20% are professionals.

== Related pages ==
- Kaimur
