= Jhajhani =

Jhajhani Jhajhani
- Village
- Location in Bihar, India Jhajhani (India)
- Coordinates: 25.11319°N 83.4078°E
- Country: India
- State: Bihar
- District: Kaimur

Area
  - Total: 2.70 km^{2} (1.04 sq mi)
- Elevation: 80 m (260 ft)

Population (2011)
  - Total: 676
  - Density: 250/km^{2} (648/sq mi)

Languages
  - Official: Bhojpuri, Hindi
- Time zone: UTC+5:30 (IST)

Jhajhani is a village in Chand block of Kaimur district, Bihar, India. As of 2011, its population was 676, in 117 households.
