= Kymore =

- Town
- Location in Madhya Pradesh, India Kymore (India)
- Coordinates: 23°23′0″N 79°44′38″E
- Country: India
- State: Madhya Pradesh
- District: Katni

Population (2007)
  - Total: 35,300

Languages
  - Official: Hindi
- Time zone: UTC+5:30 (IST)
- PIN: 483880
- Telephone code: 07626

Kymore is an industrial town and a nagar panchayat in Vijayraghavgarh tehsil in Katni district in the Indian state of Madhya Pradesh.

== Geography ==
The Kymore Hills run from the north to the west of the town. Their height ranges from 100 to 200 metres (330 to 660 ft).

== Demographics ==
As of 2001 India census, Kymore had a population of 35,300. Males constitute 53% of the population and females 47%. Kymore had an average literacy rate of 70.3%, higher than the national average of 59.5%, with male literacy at 78% and female literacy at 61%. 13% of the population is under 6.
