= Mundeshwari Temple =

Hindu temple in India

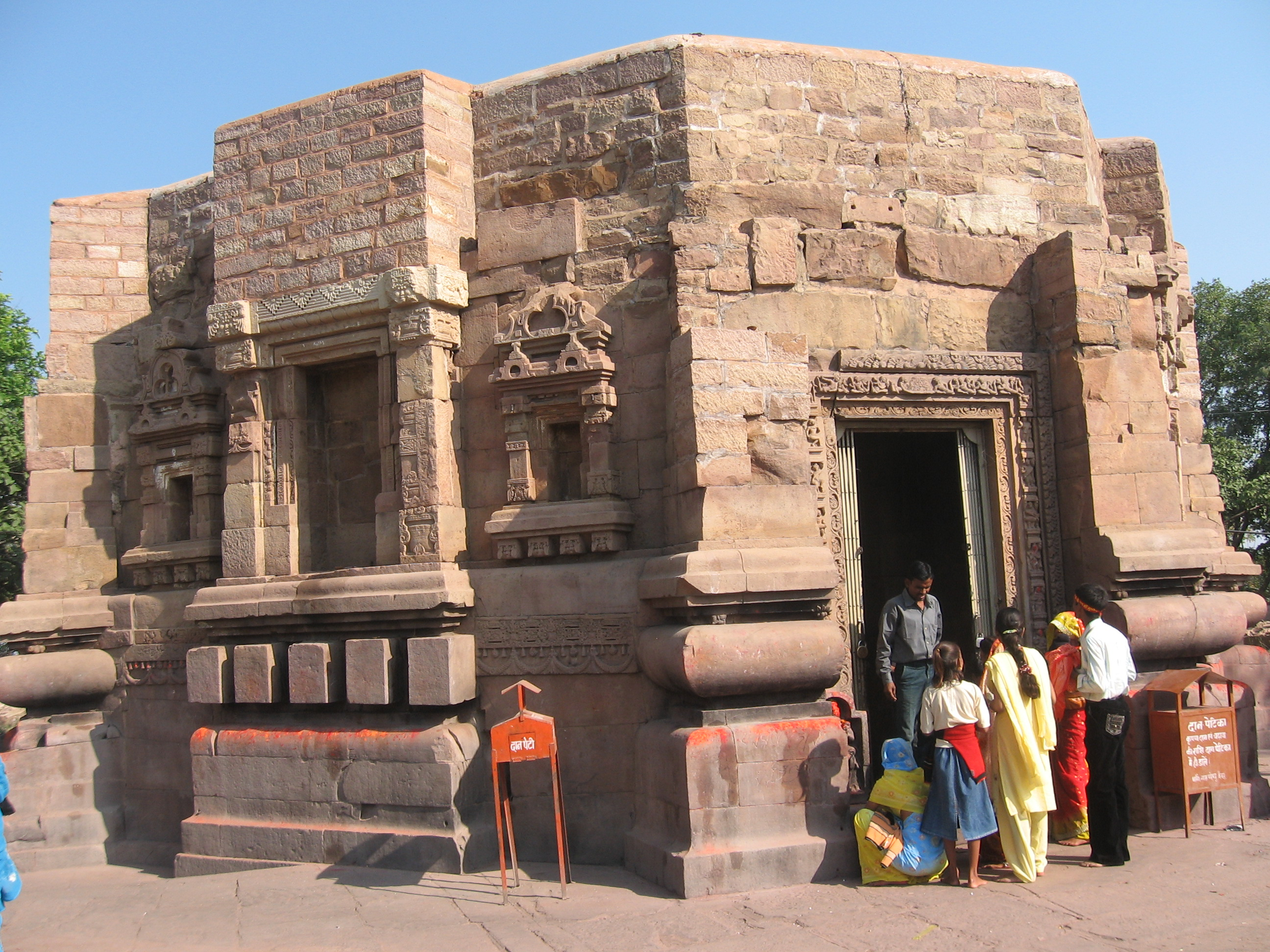
- Nagara style architecture of the temple.

- Location in Bihar Mundeshwari Temple (Bihar)

Religion
- Affiliation: Hinduism
- District: Kaimur district
- Deity: Shiva and Shakthi
- Festivals: Ramnavami, Shivratri, Navaratra

Location
- Location: Paunra Pahad, Ramgarh village
- State: Bihar
- Country: India
- Coordinates: 24.9833958°N 83.5646939°E

Architecture
- Completed: claimed: 108 CE but existing structure is dated 6th–7th century to 16th–17th century

Specifications
- Temple: One
- Elevation: 185 m (607 ft)

The Mundeshwari Devi Temple (IAST: Muṇḍeśvarī) is a Hindu temple, located at Ramgarh Village, 608 feet (185 m) on the Mundeshwari Hills of Kaimur plateau near Son River, in the Bhojpuri region of Indian state of Bihar. It is an Archaeological Survey of India (ASI) protected monument since 1915.

It is an ancient temple which is believed to be dedicated to the worship of the goddess Durga and god Shiva, and is claimed as the oldest functional Hindu temple in the world. The findings also established that here was a religious and educational center spread over the hillock and Mandaleshwar (Shiva) temple was the main shrine. The Mandaleshwari (Durga) was on the southern side. The temple was damaged and the idol of Mandaleshwari (degenerated Mundeshwari and later connected with the mythical demon Mund) was kept in the eastern chamber of the main temple.

The ASI and Bihar State Religious Trust Board have claimed the temple as dating to 108 CE making it the oldest Hindu temple in the world. However, although Mundeshwari is likely to have been an important ancient site of pilgrimage with prior religious establishments, it is argued by historians of Hindu temple architecture that the existing architectural elements and sculptures are not older than the 6th-7th century, and the present octagonal shrine may have been built or rebuilt as recently as the 16th-17th century, although incorporating elements from earlier temples that existed at the hill.

== History ==
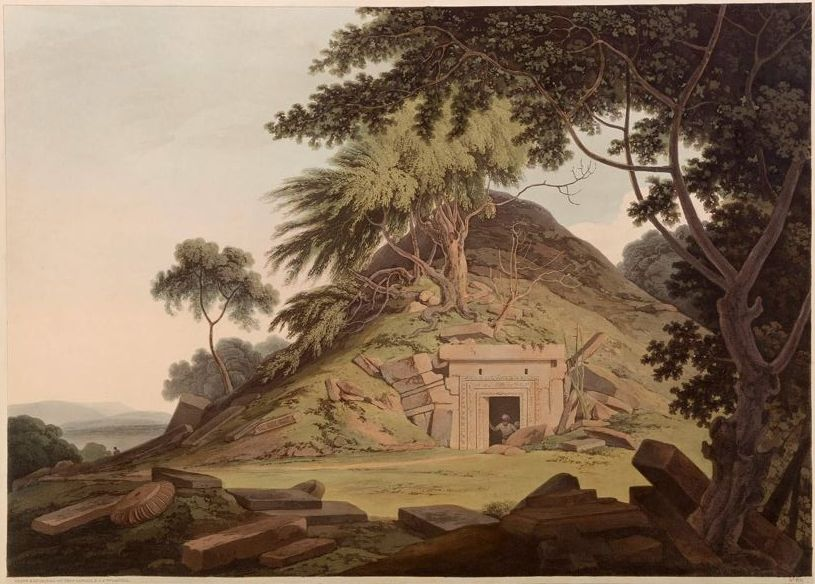
The temple as seen by Thomas Daniell ca. 1790

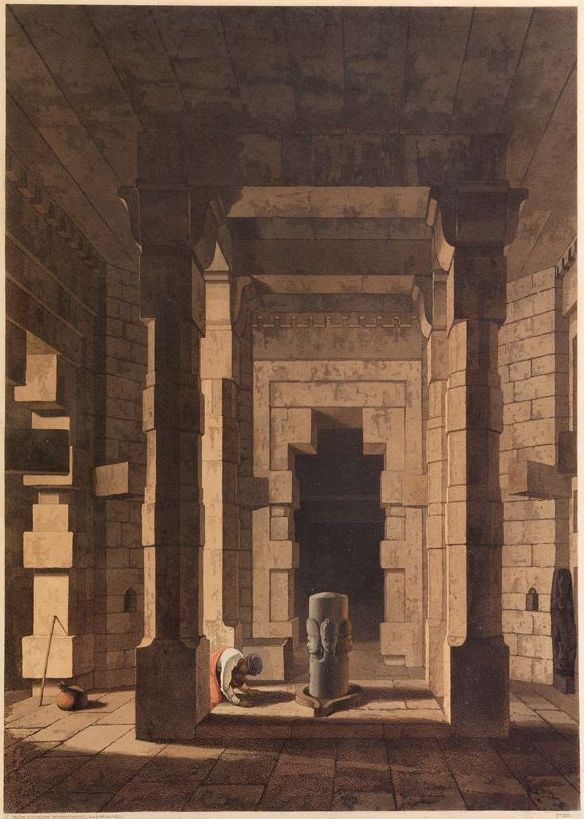
Interior of temple as painted by Thomas Daniell ca. 1790

=== Debates about age ===
An inscription was found "in debris around the temple", which mentioned year 30 (of an unknown era) and a local ruler Mahārāja Udayasena (otherwise unknown), and the form of the letters indicated a post-Gupta date. If the era being used was the regnalHarsha, it would yield a date of 636 CE. However, Neuss argues from the palaeography of the inscription that it was most likely written c. 570-590 CE. The inscription mentions the existence of some religious establishments which were existing there by this time.

Among the earlier remains a possibly fifth-century lingam is "on the pathway leading up the hill." The surviving "inscriptions, sculptures, and architectural fragments" indicate that Mundeshwari "was an important temple site from the sixth century CE (if not before), continuing on through the late seventh–early eighth century." Mundeshwari temple with its chaturmukha lingam has possibly been mentioned in the Skanda Purana.

Stylistically, existing architectural elements and sculptures are mainly dateable to the 7th century. It has been claimed that the unique architectural features indicate an early date for the temple. However, it is argued by Buckee—a historian of Hindu temple architecture—that the present octagonal shrine was most likely built "in the sixteenth–seventeenth century, incorporating doorways and moldings salvaged from the ruins of the seventh century temples that once graced the hilltop". The temple's appearance may have been altered further by the ASI "during the reconstructive work they undertook at the start of the twentieth century."

Discovery of a Brahmi inscribed seal of Sri Lankan king Dutthagamani (1st century BCE) has indicated that Mundeshwari was an ancient site of pilgrimage attracting pilgrims from as far away as Sri Lanka. On this basis, scholars in a national seminar organized by Bihar State Religious Trust Board at Patna claimed that the inscription by Udayasena in year 30 of unknown era could be 30th year of Śaka era, i.e. 108 CE. However, the palaeography of the Udayasena inscription indicates a clearly post-Gupta date, most likely c. 570-590 CE.

=== Timelines ===
- 636-638 - Chinese visitor Huen Tsang writes about a shrine on a hill top flashing light, at about a distance of 200 lee south west to Patna-The location is only of Mundeshwari.
- 1790 - Daniel brothers, Thomas and William visited Mundeshwari temple and provided its first portrait.
- 1888 – Buchanan visited the region in 1813.
- 1891-92 – First part of the broken Mundeshwari Inscription was discovered by Bloch during a survey by East India Company.
- 1903 – Second part of the temple was discovered while clearing the debris around the temple.
- 2003 – Brahmi script royal seal of Sri Lankan king Dutthagamani (101-77 BCE) was discovered by Varanasi-based historian Jahnawi Shekhar Roy which changed the earlier findings about history of the place.
- 2008 - The date of the Udayasena inscription was claimed as 30th year of Saka era (108 CE) by the scholars in a national seminar organized for the purpose by Bihar State Religious Trust Board at Patna.

== Deity ==
The worship of Devi Durga in the form of Devi Mundeshwari in the temple is also indicative of tantric cult of worship, which is practiced in Eastern India.

== Religious significance ==
Rituals and worship have been performed here without a break, hence Mundeshwari is considered one of the most ancient Hindu temples in India. The temple is visited by a large number of pilgrims each year, particularly during the Ramnavami, Shivratri festivals. A big annual fair (mela) is held nearby during the Navaratra visited by thousands.

== Architecture ==
The temple, built of stone, is on an octagonal plan, which is rare. It is the earliest specimen of the Nagara style of temple architecture in Bihar. There are doors or windows on four sides and small niches for the reception of statues in the remaining four walls. The temple shikhara or tower has been destroyed. However, a roof has been built, as part of renovation work. The interior walls have niches and bold mouldings which are carved with vase and foliage designs. At the entrance to the temple, the door jambs are seen with carved images of Dvarapalas, Ganga, Yamuna and many other murtis. The main deities in the sanctum sanctorum of the temple are of the Devi Mundeshwari and Chaturmukh (four-faced) Shiva linga. There are also two stone vessels of unusual design. Even though the Shiva linga is installed in the centre of the sanctum, the main presiding deity is Devi Mundeshwari deified inside a niche, which is seen with ten hands holding symbols riding a buffalo, attributed to Mahishasuramardini. The temple also has murtis of other popular gods such as Ganesha, Surya and Vishnu. A substantial part of this stone structure has been damaged, and many stone fragments are seen strewn around the temple. However, under the jurisdiction of ASI, it has been the subject of archaeological study for quite some time.

== Renovation and restoration ==
The Archaeological Survey of India has restored the temple under instruction from the Union Ministry of Culture. Restorative works included the removal of soot from the temple interior via a chemical treatment, repair of damage to religious murti (idol) and cataloging and documentation of scattered fragments for later reuse. Other works included installation of solar powered lighting, displays for antiquities and provision of public amenities. The Government of Bihar has allocated Rs 2 crore to improve access to the temple.

== How to reach ==
It can be reached by road via Patna, Gaya, or Varanasi. The nearest railway station is at Mohania - Bhabua Road railway station from where the temple is 22 km by road. Lal Bahadur Shastri International Airport, Varanasi is the nearest airport, located at a distance of 102 km from the Temple. Indian carriers including Air India, Spicejet, and international carriers like Air India, Thai Airways International, Korean Air and Naaz Airlines operate from here. Daily flights to Delhi, Mumbai and Kolkata are available from here.

== See also ==
- Murugan Temple, Saluvankuppam
- Chandika Sthan
- Mangala Devi Kannagi Temple
- Maa Jaleshwari Temple
- Ajgaibinath Temple
