= Chand, Kaimur =

Chand Chānd
- Village
- Location in Bihar, India Chand (India)
- Coordinates: 25.11501°N 83.39598°E
- Country: India
- State: Bihar
- District: Kaimur

Area
  - Total: 4.50 km^{2} (1.74 sq mi)
- Elevation: 85 m (279 ft)

Population (2011)
  - Total: 4,432
  - Density: 985/km^{2} (2,550/sq mi)

Languages
  - Official: Bhojpuri, Hindi
- Time zone: UTC+5:30 (IST)

Chand is a village and corresponding community development block in Kaimur district, Bihar, India. As of 2011, its population was 4,432, in 700 households. The total block population was 133,682 in 20,413 households. The population here is mainly based on agriculture.Chand is a market for the nearby villages.

== Geography ==
Chand block covers an area of 20,670 hectares.

== Demographics ==
As of 2011, the sex ratio of Chand block was 921 females to every 1000 males. Among the 0-6 age group, the sex ratio was 934. Members of scheduled castes made up 21.5% of block residents and members of scheduled tribes made up 2.18%. The block's literacy rate was 67.25%, with 77.78% of men and 55.79% of women able to read and write.

Most of Chand block's workforce was employed in agriculture in 2011, with 21.35% of workers being cultivators who owned or leased their own land and another 61.48% being agricultural labourers who worked someone else's land for wages. Another 5.35% of workers were household industry workers, and the remaining 11.81% were other workers.

== Villages ==
Chand block contains the following 137 villages:

Village name	Total land area (hectares)	Population (in 2011)
Biuri	218	2,742
Rebhanpur	40	0
Kalyanpur	32	5
Babhanpura	65	0
Rasulpur	83	6
Silauta	192	1,466
Birbhanpur	144	1,283
Narayanpur	81	495
Tikara	143	202
Shiv	211	1,668
Kishunpura	87	626
Naubant	233	109
Naukata	112	245
Chanos	325	2,001
Barahni	136	436
Kharanti	146	782
Paura	211	943
Sendura	137	475
Duguthua	169	1,121
Salaunja	66	477
Darabchak	27	0
Mohammadpur	41	0
Lasanri	101	677
Bhaluhari	107	1,245
Kuddi	452	3,232
Bhatani	171	1,118
Kuwadda	240	621
Khainti	112	633
Lanka	65	0
Goin	420	3,445
Jigana	219	1,291
Sihoria	191	1,743
Kariara	96	65
Barawan	186	643
Bheri	113	771
Auraiya	85	70
Majhgain	82	243
Majhgawan	46	0
Bhewar	178	1,592
Dhobaha Pachhim Patti	54	462
Dhobaha Purab Patti	53	646
Panrepur	80	0
Parei	91	0
Akauni	173	1,239
Karmapur	58	459
Babhniawan	263	1,576
Parhi	412	2,673
Chand (block headquarters)	450	4,432
Jhajhani	270	676
Konahra	157	806
Chakia	64	0
Kurhnu	171	966
Ichawan	277	2,109
Diwane	158	924
Pahraicha	110	847
Milki	46	0
Mohammadpur	23	111
Rajpur	32	53
Bharuhiya	102	1,213
Sirihra	550	4,971
Alipur	36	400
Ailae Khurd	106	0
Ailae Patna	407	3,274
Bahadura	134	965
Baghi	47	106
Ghatmapur	49	0
Parasia	42	246
Baghchhara	85	604
Digghi	58	655
Lakhopakar	49	222
Seha	44	255
Rampur Pathra	109	591
Bamhani	93	63
Karaundia	113	2,374
Chanda	44	1,752
Pateri	146	2,337
Jamalpur	151	1,651
Dugauli	64	777
Shiwrampur	88	1,665
Nindaur	47	219
Rampur	72	366
Nandiha Bhzurg	56	302
Jagdishpur	11	339
Mahdaich	83	552
Naudiha Khurd	46	24
Kota	112	345
Kharanti Khurd	80	794
Baruna	49	72
Mararia	75	324
Ratanpurwa	34	192
Kharauli	323	1,654
Mutmuria	156	220
Basaha	91	1,323
Pasoiya	68	263
Dharhua	184	1,727
Chhotki Bharari	242	2,117
Harpokhar	75	0
Patesar	357	2,242
Saukhara	441	2,508
Bheladih	152	954
Surha	142	1,408
Ramtali	45	0
Hamirpur	120	665
Songar	180	1,486
Bharari Kalan	344	2,430
Lohdan	452	3,837
Hansrew	204	1,783
Nauan	114	329
Kekrha	166	467
Harkatha	51	0
Kilni	468	2,391
Piparia	134	701
Saraila	104	422
Lahuri Bairi	46	0
Baghaila	245	1,484
Bairi	575	1,923
Asthanpur	35	0
Maheshpur	25	0
Dewaitpur	49	0
Chauri	326	1,951
Safi	128	0
Gohuwan	244	1,632
Morawa	46	368
Kutbanpur	98	269
Dulahi	331	4,437
Amawan	439	2,860
Barharia	121	581
Kesari	324	1,794
Kalaura	79	866
Bararhi	246	930
Ledari	203	2,616
Parasrampur	36	0
Fakirana	26	0
Bahuara	201	1,201
Darunpur	100	954
Sonao	222	1,799
Mohammadpur	64	0
