= Chainpur, Kaimur =

Chainpur
- Village
- Location in Bihar, India Chainpur (India)
- Coordinates: 25.0345°N 83.50655°E
- Country: India
- State: Bihar
- District: Kaimur

Area
  - Total: 1.129 km^{2} (0.436 sq mi)
- Elevation: 91 m (299 ft)

Population (2011)
  - Total: 11,306
  - Density: 10,010/km^{2} (25,940/sq mi)

Languages
  - Official: Bhojpuri, Hindi
- Time zone: UTC+5:30 (IST)

Chainpur is a village and corresponding community development block in Kaimur district of Bihar, India. It is located 11 km west of the district headquarters of Bhabua. As of 2011, the village population was 11,306 in 1,653 households, while the block population was 187,692 in 30,189 households. The main village Chainpur was also before known as Malikpur on the name of zamindar Malik Khan. Chainpur was established in early 1600s.

== Geography ==
Chainpur lies in the hilly tracts of Kaimur district.

== Demographics ==
Chainpur is a rural block with no major urban centres. The block's sex ratio in 2011 was 939 females for every 1000 males, which was the highest sex ratio in Kaimur district (the district-wide ratio was 920). The sex ratio was higher in the 0-6 age group, where it was 968 (the district-wide value was 942). Members of scheduled castes made up 20.06% of the block population and members of scheduled castes made up 4.87%. The block's literacy rate was 62.53%, compared to the district-wide average of 69.34%. There was a 21.79% gender literacy gap (compared with the district-wide 20.97%), with 73.04% of men but only 51.25% of women able to read and write.

Most of the Chainpur block workforce in 2011 was employed in agriculture, with 18.52% being agricultural labourers who owned or leased their own land and another 58.78% being agricultural labourers who worked someone else's land for wages. Another 6.31% worked in household industries, and the remaining 16.39% were other workers. Men made up around two-thirds of the block workforce, with there being 43,681 male and 20,795 female workers in 2011.

== History ==
In Chainpur is the mausoleum of Bakhtiar Khan, the son-in-law of Sher Shah Suri. The town was originally established by the descendants of Diwan Rao, a son of Dham Dev Rao brother of the Rajput king Kam Dev Rao. There is also the Hindu shrine of Harsu Brahm. According to the shrine's tradition, Chainpur king of Raja Shaliwahan, Sikarwar . The family of Chainpur became immensely powerful during Mughal empire. Chainpur was made a jagir during Mughals and a fort name as "Chainpur ki rani ka kila" was made by the family. The family of Chainpur became immensely powerful during Mughal empire. Chainpur was made a jagir during Mughals and a fort name as "Chainpur ki rani ka kila" was made by the family. They had better relationship with the zamindar families of Kamsar. Before even Bhabua came under the Jagir of Chainpur and was a small group of villages primarily established by Akhlash Khan of Ikhlashpur wo was a governor of Bihar during Shahjahan. It was Akhlash Khan who made Malik wishal Khan a Faujdar and Kiladar of Rohtas garh. The jagir had two Parganas name as Bhabua and Mohania. The family of Chainpur, Mohania, and Bhabua was also established by the descendants of Dham Dev Rao a Sikarwar (also spelled Sakarwar) Rajput king, who later came down to Ghazipur and their descendants established many villages. His elder brother was Kam dev who descendants established Sherpur, Reotipur (Dalpatpur), Dildarnagar Kamsar and many other places in Ghazipur and Bihar. From the same place belonged Raja Deendardar Khan of Dildarnagar, During Mughal empire and early British era descendants of Dham Dev and Kam Dev ruled a very large part of Ghazipur district, Rohtasgarh, Kaimur region, and Chausa in Buxar.

== Villages ==
Chainpur block contains the following 177 villages, of which 151 are inhabited and 26 are uninhabited:

Village name	Total land area (hectares)	Population (in 2011)
Semaria	154	1,297
Sadauli	39.2	0
Koindi	231.9	1,995
Khajopur	44.9	0
Ghanti	162.3	1,125
Ramgarh	333	1,844
Bhaganda	154	1,332
Ismailpur	121.8	703
Hargawan	121.4	696
Ismailpur Arazi	330.2	378
Ramauli	90.6	813
Narsinghpur	23.5	0
Neura	25.5	278
Barhauna	164.7	2,257
Kharanti	87.8	246
Dih Bhujaina	247.7	2,450
Siur	52.6	0
Raghubir Garh	124.6	1,587
Dubepur	18.6	154
Kakrikundi	107	431
Bardiha	41.7	821
Anapur	338.7	498
Nonian	34.8	39
Malawan	82	21
Banpur	66.8	0
Baburtara	24.3	0
Chalania	51.8	0
Dharahra	55	712
Diha	143.3	2,369
Dumaria	195.1	520
Kunda	176.4	0
Lakhmanpur	59	1,837
Nandih	64	495
Udaipur	32.8	18
Shukulpur	28.7	582
Nandna	153.4	1,835
Halka	40.1	0
Nirajanpur	40.1	703
Tenaura	33.6	690
Merh	88.2	2,153
Mohammadpur	103.2	460
Chitarhi	101.6	811
Mahua Pokhar	25.1	0
Parbatpur	225	1,990
Chauth Parbatpur	33.6	52
Sanabo	94	445
Rahjitpur	24.3	0
Shiwapur	142	924
Kalyanipur	46	1,449
Lohra	85.8	1,384
Shukul Purwa	20.2	0
Majhui	159.8	3,246
Udai Rampur	374	3,248
Jigina	116.6	828
Rajpur	36.8	29
Madurni	139	221
Naudiha	94.3	194
Kauria Chak	42.5	245
Shahpur	40.1	653
Sirsi	123.8	1,512
Meunra	266	63
Madurna	416.8	4,714
Sarpani	47.4	266
Hata	254.8	9,257
Saraiya	198.7	2,242
Humaun Mardan	69.2	0
Tiwai	187.4	2,465
Lodipur	179.3	2,050
Karaundia	47	577
Kharigawan	176.4	2,280
Awnkhara	285.7	2,573
Sikandarpur	295.4	4,566
Masoi Khurd	316.5	3,395
Gangapur	55	582
Harbanspur	28.7	30
Bhagwatipur	104.4	482
Sahebahe	96	655
Amawan	297.8	4,621
Sirbit	521.2	5,018
Rupin	102	1,039
Masoin	332.6	3,108
Khakhra	43.3	0
Kurain	278	1,303
Karjav	305.1	2,943
Karji	369.5	2,877
Balubheria	146.1	107
Sherpur	78.5	15
Dobhri	133.5	1,370
Phulkara	96	0
Neura	98.7	350
Harnampur	22.7	194
Rajpur	36.4	0
Babhaniawan	63.9	742
Madra	154	797
Khargipur	27.9	326
Deua	70.4	715
Nainpura	51.8	486
Hukkasarai	66.8	0
Sonbarsa	94.3	1,134
Arail	145.7	1,058
Chauthi	56.7	245
Isia	108	2,826
Sakhelipur	37.2	0
Bararhi	173.6	1,177
Danrwa	104	607
Teli Pokhar	37.2	55
Danrwa	57	769
Bhadaura	32	1,754
Fakhrabad	380	2,222
Manpur	321	3,627
Muri	318.5	3,377
Harnathpur	36	0
Biur	206	2,605
Gazipur	79.3	1,034
Biddi	74	1,377
Gonai	38	462
Parsotimpur	59.9	563
Bhualpur	60	700
Bari Takia	55	671
Maliksaray	195	1,152
Chainpur (block headquarters)	112.9	11,306
Naughara	328.6	2,346
Kharaurua	280	1,257
Salempur	80.1	588
Isapur	151.4	1,076
Gobindpur	21	310
Sherpur	260.2	1,931
Lohra	211.6	1,719
Jairampur	146.9	1,142
Nandgawan	134.4	1,835
Sohawal	68.8	745
Rupa Patti	142.9	1,255
Nati	46.5	198
Damodar	99.6	505
Pahladpur	103	337
Bhagwanpur	74.9	1,134
Jagaria	99.8	1,464
Sherpur	95.9	1,165
Dulahra	117	1,104
Narainpur	32.8	0
Raghaisagar	41.7	0
Jagdishpur	43.3	0
Narsinghpur	142.4	907
Kewa	157.8	1,647
Mahula	200.3	1,188
Bukna Mahula	26.7	0
Baurai	163.9	1,545
Gangudih	81.8	643
Saraiya	47.8	409
Khoradih	153.4	638
Nimiatanr	67.2	970
Basra	56.7	0
Babhan Parsia	62.3	0
Parsia	90.6	963
Danrwa	34.8	0
Israrhi	53.4	430
Basawanpur	52.2	483
Chanda	118.9	469
Sihora	74.1	140
Birna	75.7	424
Karaundia	150.1	880
Majhganwan	9,778	435
Bhaluburan	1,839.7	520
Karkatgarh	1,690.4	294
Gosara	875	196
Kamharia	1,465.4	284
Jharia	1,332.6	638
Mahuli	1,665.3	176
Masani	841.3	529
Koilra	415.2	32
Dumarkon	957.9	1,196
Harsoti	800	163
Semra	1,383.6	967
Baghaila	632.9	408
Asanda	378	40
Dhumardeo	1,073	350
Bhaganda	432	118
