= Karkat Waterfall =

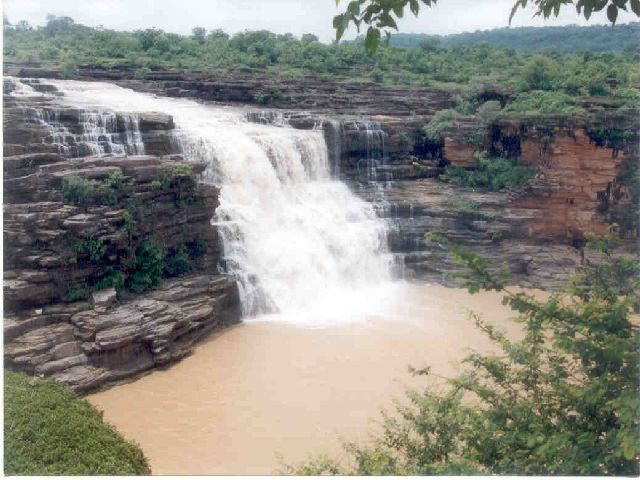
- Interactive map of Karkat Waterfall
- Location: kaimur Range, Bihar, India
- Type: Segmented
- Total height: 100 ft (30 m)
- Number of drops: 1
- Total width: 300 ft (91 m)
- Watercourse: Karmanasa River

Karkat Waterfall is situated in the Karkatgarh Village, Kaimur Range in the Kaimur district of the Indian state of Bihar on Karmanasa River. It is a natural habitat of the crocodile at waterfall and the Government of Bihar is developing it as crocodile conservation reserve and eco-tourism spot.

== History ==
The Karkatgarh Waterfall was a crocodile hunting place for Mughal rulers and British officials who also came to enjoy the beautiful floral and fauna around the place. British officials constructed a dak bungalow with a view on the 300 feet wide and 100 feet high waterfall. British officials Henry Ramsay mentioned it as the finest fall surrounded by beautiful sceneries. The fall is now part of the Kaimur Wildlife Sanctuary established in 1979 and the hunting of crocodiles and other animals is now prohibited.

== Crocodile Conservation Reserve ==
The Government of Bihar has initiated to turn this place into a Crocodile Conservation Reserve. The initiative came after at least 75 crocodiles were spotted in Karmanasa River at Karkatgarh waterfall showing it up as a natural habitat for the reptiles of the particular kind. In 2016 the Government of Bihar has sanctioned RS 3 lakh as seed money for preliminary study. As per the studied by crocodile expert from all over the India has sent the plan proposal to centre for its funding. The union ministert of forests environment has sanctioned RS 3 lakh in 2018 for expert assessment data collection and preparing a micro plan for the project. The Wildlife institute of India has hired researchers for data collection behaviour study and assessment. As per plan Natural condition would be created for crocodiles in two test ponds where female reptiles would be kept for laying their eggs and rearing their young ones.

== See also ==
- List of waterfalls
- List of waterfalls in India
