= Karkat, Afghanistan =

Karkat Kārkāt
- Location in Afghanistan
- Coordinates: 36°59′0″N 73°23′0″E
- Country: Afghanistan
- Province: Badakhshan Province
- District: Wakhan
- Time zone: + 4.30

Karkat (Persian: کارکت) is a village in Badakhshan Province in northeastern Afghanistan.
