= Gopal Prasad Sinha =

Indian neurologist

- Born: Patna, Bihar, India
- Occupation: Neurologist
- Known for: service in the field of Neurology
- Spouse: Indira Sinha
- Children: Ajay Alok, Jaya Sinha Kumra
- Awards: Padma Shri

Gopal Prasad Sinha is an Indian neurologist, politician and a member of the Institutional Ethical Committee of the Indian Council of Medical Research. He was born and brought up in Patna, in the Indian state of Bihar and is an alumnus of Patna University. He unsuccessfully contested in 2014 Indian Parliament elections from the Patna Sahib constituency under the Janata Dal (United) candidacy, against the incumbent Member of Parliament, Shatrughan Sinha.

Sinha was married to late Indira Sinha, an educationist, and has a daughter, Jaya Sinha Kumra, and a son, Ajay Alok, who is a known politician from Bihar. He is a 2004 recipient of the fourth highest Indian civilian award, Padma Shri for his services to the field of medicine.
