= Bhabua =

- City
- Location in Bihar, India
- Coordinates: 25.05°N 83.62°E
- Country: India
- State: Bihar
- Division: Patna
- District: Kaimur
- Established: 1532
- Founder: Sher Shah Suri
- Wards: 25

Government

Area
  - Total: 12 km^{2} (4.6 sq mi)
- Elevation: 76 m (249 ft)

Population (2011)
  - Total: 61,999
  - Density: 5,200/km^{2} (13,000/sq mi)

Languages
  - Official: Bhojpuri, Hindi
- Time zone: UTC+5:30 (IST)
- PIN: 821101
- Telephone code: 06189
- Vehicle registration: BR-45
- Website: https://kaimur.nic.in/

Bhabua is the main city of Kaimur district in the state of Bihar, India. Bhabua is known for its famous historical Mundeshwari Temple and the Kaimur Range. It is located 84 km from Varanasi.

== Geography ==
Bhabua is located at 25.05°N 83.62°E. The Buxar district of Bihar State and the Ghazipur district of U.P. State bound it on the North. On the south is the Garhwa district of Jharkhand State and on the West is the Chandauli and Sonbhadra of the U.P. State. On the East is Rohtas district of Bihar State on the bank of river suara.

== Notable places ==
- The Mundeshwari Temple The Mundeshwari Temple is located at an elevation of 608 feet on the Mundeshwari Hills of Kaimur plateau near Son canal, in the Indian state of Bihar. It is an Archaeological Survey of India protected monument since 1915.
- Baidyanath Village is situated 9 km to the south of Ramgarh block headquarters. The village is home to a Lord Shiva temple that was built by the rulers of Pratihar dynasty. Numerous coins and others valuables of historical importance have been discovered here. According to archeologists, the temple was renovated in 812-13 AD.
- Karkat Waterfall is situated in the Karkatgarh Village, Kaimur Range in the Kaimur district of the Indian state of Bihar on Karmanasa River. It is a natural habitat of crocodiles at the waterfall and the Government of Bihar is developing it as a crocodile conservation reserve and eco-tourism spot.
- Telhar Kund is the name of a waterfall located in the Kaimur district of Bihar, India. The fall is located close to the origins of Durgavati River. It is only a few kilometres from the Durgavati reservoir project.
- Chainpur is situated 11 km to the west of Bhabua headquarters. there is the Hindu shrine of "Harsu Brahm", which is famous for healing people affected from evil power.

== Transport ==
Bhabua Road railway station is the nearest Railway Station on the Howrah-New Delhi Grand Chord, which is about 14 km north from Bhabua town. The main trains are Purushottam Express, Mahabodhi Express, Poorva Express, Kalka Mail, Mumbai Mail, Doon Express, Chambal Express, Shipra Express, Sealdah Exp, Budhpurnima Express, Asansol - Ahmedabad Express, Deekshabhoomi Express, Jodhpur Exp, Garib Nawaz Express, Ranchi - Varanasi Express, Jharkhand Swarna Jayanti Express, Sasaram - Anand Vihar Terminus AC Express etc. The town is 195 km from Patna and 84 km from Varanasi by road.

NH 2 (G.T. Road) crosses through the center of the district from Karmanasha to Kudra for about 50 km. NH 30 originates from it near Mohania and connects this district with the capital Patna via Arah. Apart from these, there are also a few State Highways in the district.

Mohania Sub-division is situated on Gaya-Mughalsarai Section of Grand Chord Railway line; the railway station is called Bhabua Road. The district headquarters is 14 km south from the railway station and the G.T. Road. The railway station has four platforms for the smooth flow of traffic.

== See also ==
- Sasaram
