= Telhar =

Telhar Falls
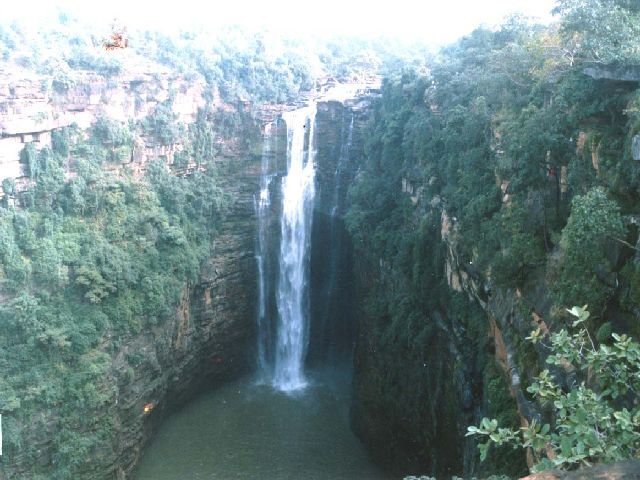
- Telhar Falls
- Interactive map of Telhar Falls
- Location: Kaimur, Bihar, India
- Type: Cataract, segmented
- Number of drops: 1

Telhar is the name of a waterfall located in the Kaimur district of Bihar, India. The fall is located close to the origins of Durgavati River. It is only a few kilometres from the Durgavati reservoir project.

The water coming out from Telhar Kund remains cool in every season, every month. Amidst the area and Forests of kaimur hills are situated beautiful Telhar Kund Waterfall, Tutla Bhavani Waterfall, Kashish Water Fall, Manjhar Kund and greenery that becomes more vibrant during rainy days.

== See also ==
- List of waterfalls
- List of waterfalls in India
