= Kaimur Range =

Mountain range in India

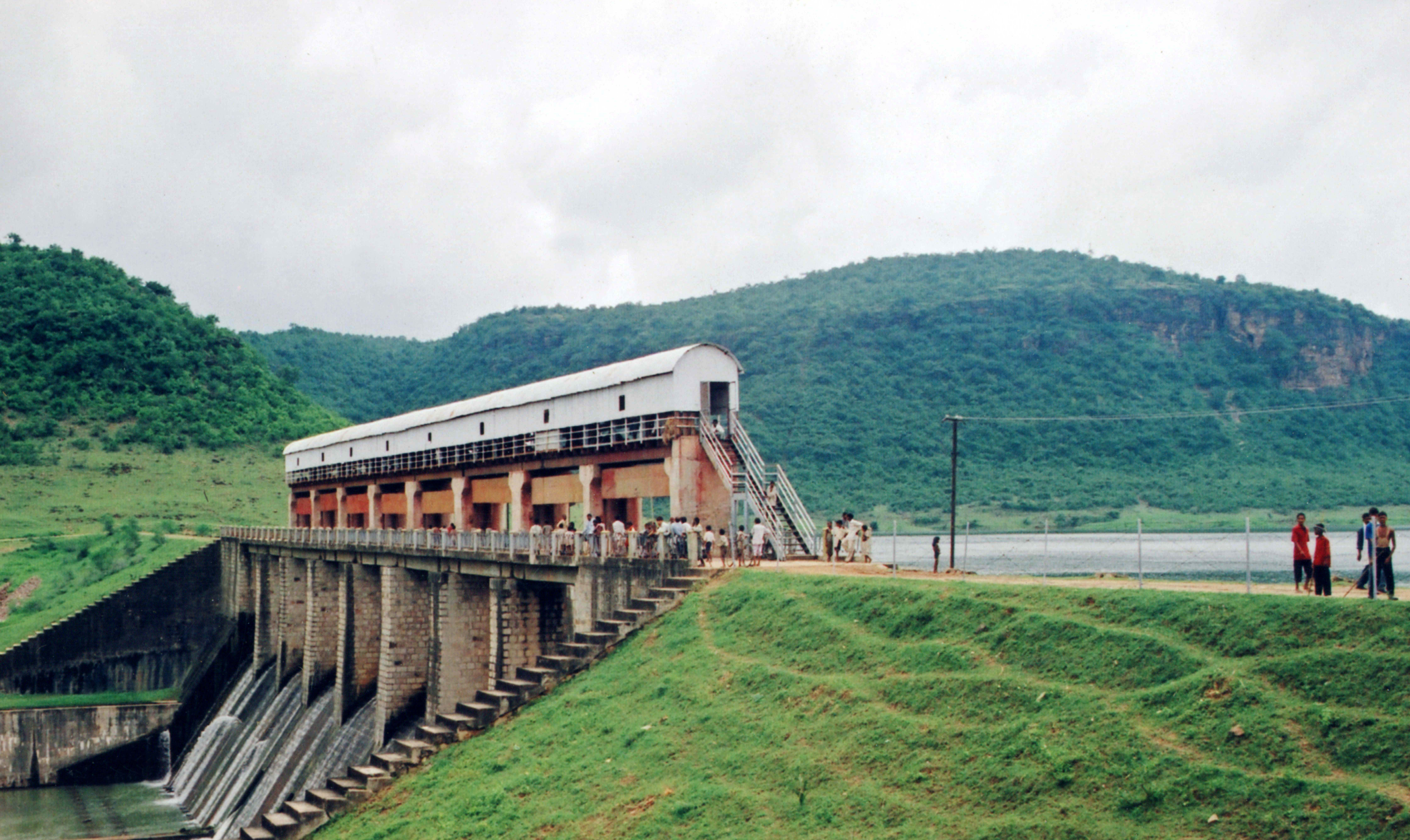
- View of the range towering above the Kohira dam in Kaimur district

Dimensions
- Length: 483 km (300 mi) SW-NE
- Width: 80 km (50 mi)

Geography
- Location within India
- Country: India
- States: Madhya Pradesh, Uttar Pradesh, Bihar
- Rivers: Son, Tamsa or Tons, Ken, Karmanasa and Durgavati
- Range coordinates: 24°35′N 82°04′E

Kaimur Range (also spelt Kymore) is the eastern portion of the Vindhya Range, about 483 kilometres (300 mi) long, extending from around Katangi in Jabalpur district of Madhya Pradesh to around Sasaram in Rohtas district of Bihar. It passes through the Rewa and Mirzapur divisions. The range never rises more than a few hundred metres above the surrounding plains and has a maximum width of around 80 km.

== The range ==
The southern part of the Vindhyan Range up to Katangi is called Bhander Range. Beyond this point the escarpment enclosing the land-locked valley of Sirampur and the hill range in continuation is called the Kaimur Range.

The most important physiographic feature in eastern Madhya Pradesh is the great Kaimur escarpment. This forms the watershed or divide for two of the major rivers of peninsular India, the Son on the south and Tamsa or Tons on the north. Throughout its length of 300 miles and throughout its continuation into Narmada valley, it is not breached at any point by any stream flowing northwards, with a few minor exceptions. Everywhere the scarp rises to a height of 500 to 1000 feet above the low ground at its feet. The unique feature of the absence of any gorge or wind gap across the Kaimur scarp indicates that no stream of considerable size ever flowed due north across the scarp.

The Kaimur Range runs through the entire length of Maihar and Amarpatan tahsils of Satna district in an easterly direction slightly inclined to the north. At Jhukehi, the strike of the Kaimurs is displaced, producing the only gap in the whole length of the Vindhyas. Advantage of the gap is taken in the construction of the Mirzapur road and the Jabalpur-Allahabad railway line.

== Plateaus and waterfalls ==
A series of plateaus runs along the Kaimur Range. These fluvial plateaus, consists of a series of descending plateaus, starting with the Panna Plateau in the west, followed by Bhander Plateau and Rewa Plateau and ending with Rohtas Plateau in the east.

There is a well-marked fall line along these plateaus, extending from Purwa or Tons Falls on the Tons River in the north-western part of the Rewa district of Madhya Pradesh in the west to Sasaram in the east. Hundreds of waterfalls ranging in height between 15 m and 180 m are found along this fault line as all the major rivers emerging from the Kaimur Range and draining due northwards make tremendous waterfalls while descending through the northern foreland of the Indian peninsula. Significant waterfalls along this fault line are: Purwa or Tons Falls (70 m) on the Tons River (in Rewa district, MP), Chachai Falls (127 m) on the Bihad River, a tributary of Tons River, the Keoti Falls (98 m) on the Mahana River, a tributary of Tons River, Odda Falls (145 m) on the Odda River, a tributary of Belah River, which is itself a tributary of Tones River, Devdari Waterfall (58 m) on the Karmanasa River (Rohtas plateau, Bihar), Telhar (80 m) on the Suara West River (Rohtas plateau), Suara Falls (120 m) on the Suara East River, Durgawaati Falls (80 m) on the Durgavati River (Rohtas plateau), Okharean Kund Falls (90 m) on Gopath River (Rohtas plateau), Dhuan Kund Falls (30 m) (Rohtas plateau near Sasaram) on the Dhoba River, Kuaridah Falls (180 m) on the Ausane River, a tributary of Son River, Rohtas plateau, Rakim Kund Falls (168 m), on the Gayghat River, a tributary of Ausane River (Rohtas plateau).

Prehistoric rock paintings have been discovered in the Kaimur hills, Nawada and Jamui. A Neolithic settlement was also discovered in the thick of the alluvium, over the bank of the Ganges at Chirand. The rock paintings depict prehistoric lifestyle and natural environment. The paintings display the sun, moon, stars, animals, plants, trees, rivers and are believed to represent love towards nature. The paintings also highlight daily life of the early humans in Bihar, displaying hunting, running, dancing, and walking. The rock paintings in Bihar are not only identical to those in central and southern India, but also are similar to those in Europe and Africa. The rock paintings of Spain's Altamira and France's Lascaux are almost identical to those found in Bihar. Adi Satguru Ashram situated near Maa Mundeshwari Temple near Bhabhua (Kaimur) is a must see.

== Protected areas ==
Protected areas in the Kaimur Range include:

- Kaimoor Wildlife Sanctuary in Uttar Pradesh
- Chandra Prabha Wildlife Sanctuary in Uttar Pradesh
- Kaimur Wildlife Sanctuary in Bihar
