= Kaimur district =

District in Bihar, India

Coordinates: 25.040591°N 83.612409°E

- District of Bihar
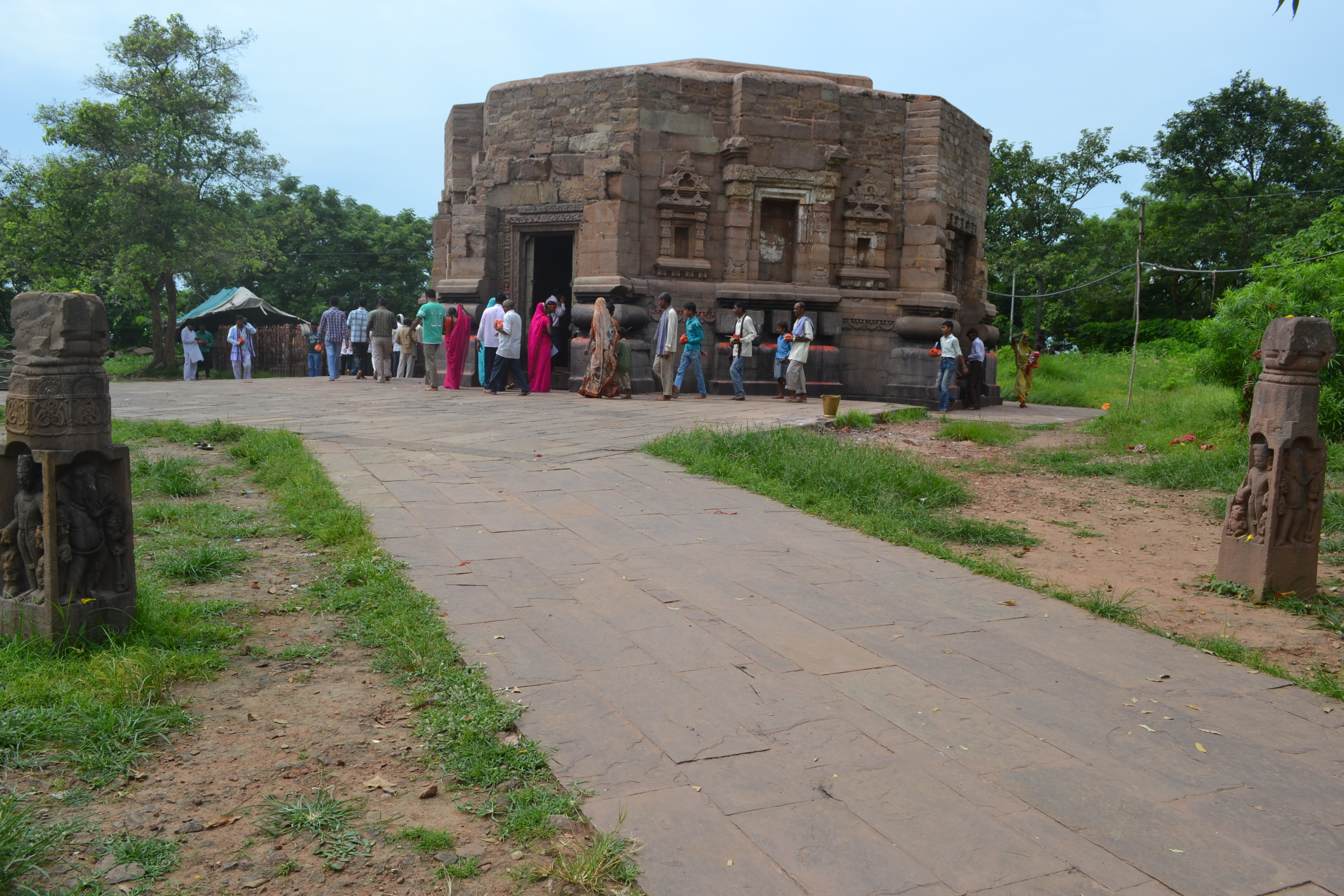
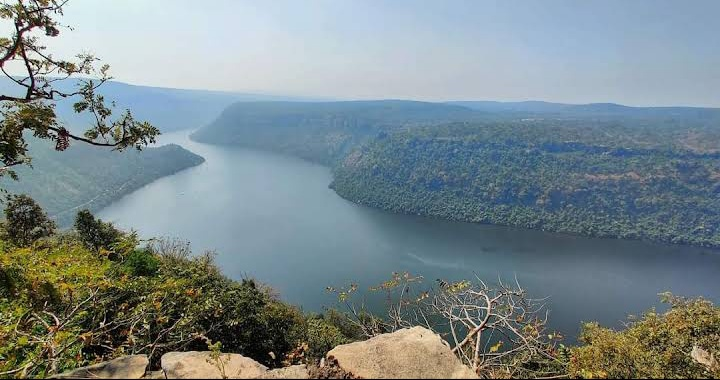
- Top: Mundeshwari Temple; Bottom: Durgavati River in Kaimur Hills
- Interactive map of Kaimur district
- Country: India
- State: Bihar
- Division: Patna Division
- District: Bhabua

Government
  - District Magistrate: Shri Nitin Kumar Singh (IAS)
  - Member of Parliament: Manoj Kumar, INC

Area
  - Total: 3,362 km^{2} (1,298 sq mi)

Population (2011)
  - Total: 1,626,384
- Demonym: Kaimuriya

Language
  - Official: Hindi,
  - Additional official: Urdu
  - Regional: Bhojpuri
- Time zone: UTC+5:30 (IST)
- PIN: 8211xx (Kaimur)
- ISO 3166 code: IN-BR
- Vehicle registration: BR-45
- Lok Sabha: Sasaram
- Sex ratio: 0.920 (2011) ♂/♀
- Literacy (2011): 69.34%
- Website: http://www.kaimur.bih.nic.in/

Kaimur district is one of the 38 districts of Bihar, India. The district headquarters is at Bhabua. Before 1991, it was part of Rohtas District. Until 1764, the region was a part of Ghazipur District and Kamsaar Raj and later it was a part of Chainpur Estate till 1837.

Located in southwestern Bihar in the Patna division, the district occupies an area of 3363 km^{2} and has a population of 1,626,384 (as of 2011) with the rank of 307th in the country. The district has a Literacy rate of 69.34% (392nd in the country). The district has 18 colleges, 58 high schools, 146 middle schools, and 763 primary schools. The district has a total of 1699 villages. The district also has 120 post offices and 151 panchayats, and is well connected with NH-2 (Grand Trunk Road). It is served by Bhabua Road railway station (BBU) and is located on the main route which connects Sealdah to Mumbai via Gaya Junction.

The most spoken languages are Hindi and Bhojpuri. Due to its close proximity to eastern Uttar Pradesh, people here have a Purvanchali tinge in their language.

== History ==
Kaimur district was established on 17 March 1991 when it was split off from Rohtas district. It was called Bhabua district until 1994, when it was renamed to its current name.

The earliest evidence of human habitation in the district consists of rock paintings in the Lehda forest that date to around 20,000 years ago. In June 2012, erotic Pala sculptures were excavated in the village of Baidyanath.

It is currently a part of the Red Corridor. In the other side it is associated with belief of Hindus it is Penitential of Atri (Sanskrit: अत्रि) or Attri Rishi & one of the oldest temple in India of Maa Mundeshwari Temple which is the part of attraction of tourism.

== Geography ==
Kaimur district occupies an area of 3,362 square kilometres (1,298 sq mi), comparatively equivalent to Russia's Vaygach Island. Geographically, the district can be divided into two parts: a hilly area and a plains area. The hilly area is known as the Kaimur Plateau (also known as Rohtas Plateau). The plain area on the western side is flanked by the rivers Karmanasa and the Durgavati. The Kudra River lies on its eastern side. Buxar district of Bihar State and Ghazipur district of Uttar Pradesh bound it on the north. To the south is Rohtas district of Bihar, and to the west are Chandauli district and Mirzapur district of Uttar Pradesh. To the east is Rohtas district of Bihar.

Kaimur district has a large forest cover, measuring roughly 106,300 hectares, which contains the Kaimur Wildlife Sanctuary, home to tigers, leopards and chinkaras. Waterfalls like Karkat Waterfall and Telhar are present here.

== Place to Interest ==
- Kaimur Wildlife Sanctuary Natural wildlife
- Mundeshwari Temple
- Karkat Waterfall
- Telhar Kund
- Banshi Khoh Adhaura
- Karamchat Dam

== Politics ==
District	No.	Constituency	Name	Party	Alliance	Remarks
Kaimur	203	Ramgarh	Satish Kumar Singh Yadav	BSP	None	
Kaimur	204	Mohania (SC)	Sangita Kumari	BJP	NDA	
Kaimur	205	Bhabua	Bharat Bind	BJP	NDA	
Kaimur	206	Chainpur	Mohammad Zama Khan	JD(U)	NDA	

== Economy ==
Agriculture is the main component of the economy in the district. Rice, wheat, telhan, dalhan and maize are the main crops. Industries located in the district include Vanaspati Oil Ltd., ACC Limited and the Power Grid Corporation of India's high voltage direct current (HVDC) grid station at Pusauli.

In 2006 Kaimur was named as one of the country's 250 most backward districts (out of a total of 640). It is one of the 36 districts in Bihar currently receiving funds from the Backward Regions Grant Fund Programme (BRGF).The Mudeshwari Mata Temple have a very huge potential to be developed into a religious tourism hub.

== Divisions ==
Kaimur district is divided into 11 community development blocks, grouped together into 2 subdivisions, based at Bhabua and Mohania:

- Bhabua subdivision
1. Adhaura
2. Bhabua
3. Bhagwanpur
4. Chainpur
5. Chand
6. Rampur
- Mohania subdivision
1. Durgawati
2. Kudra
3. Mohania
4. Nuaon
5. Ramgarh

== Villages ==
- Kamta
- Ailay

== Transport ==
=== Road ===
National Highway 19 (G.T. Road) crosses through Mohania Town, Pusauli and Kudra.

National Highway 319 (India) originates from Mohania and connects with the capital Patna via Arrah. Apart from these, there are also a few state highways in the city. Mohania is connected to Bauxar via Ramgarh from the south and with Bhabua (district capital, Adhaura, Bhagwanpur) from the south. The State Highway 14 connects Bhabua to Mohania.

Bhabua Road Railway Station is (Mohania Town) situated on Gaya–Mughalsarai section of Grand Chord Railway line. Bhabua (the district headquarters) is 14 km southward from the Bhabua Road railway station.

The famous Mundeshawari Devi Temple (the 'oldest functional' temple of world) is about 10 km south to Bhabua and about 25 km south to the railway station. If someone wants to visit the temple then he should arrive at Bhabua Road station first then he may take a direct bus to Mundeshawari Devi temple or may first take bus to Bhabua and then an auto/tempo to the temple.

The nearest airport is Lal Bahadur Shastri International Airport (VNS) (Babatpur, Varanasi).

== Demographics ==
Historical population
Year	Pop.	±% p.a.
1901	317,384	—
1911	301,646	−0.51%
1921	293,753	−0.26%
1931	322,778	+0.95%
1941	377,028	+1.57%
1951	435,283	+1.45%
1961	526,251	+1.92%
1971	656,905	+2.24%
1981	783,045	+1.77%
1991	972,949	+2.20%
2001	1,275,579	+2.75%
2011	1,626,384	+2.46%

Religions in Kaimur district (2011)
Religion	Percent
Hinduism	89.54%
Islam	9.55%
Buddhism	0.47%
Other or not stated	0.44%

According to the 2011 census Kaimur district has a population of 1,626,384, roughly equal to the nation of Guinea-Bissau or the US state of Idaho. This gives it a ranking of 307th in India (out of a total of 640). The district has a population density of 488 inhabitants per square kilometre (1,260/sq mi) . Its population growth rate over the decade 2001–2011 was 27.54%. Kaimur has a sex ratio of 919 females for every 1000 males, and a literacy rate of 71.01%. 4.03% of the population lives in urban areas. Scheduled Castes and Scheduled Tribes make up 22.69% and 3.57% of the population respectively.

=== Languages ===
Languages in Kaimur district (2011)
1. Bhojpuri (90.5%)
2. Hindi (7.11%)
3. Urdu (2.13%)
4. Others (0.21%)

At the time of the 2011 Census of India, 90.55% of the population in the district spoke Bhojpuri, 7.11% Hindi and 2.13% Urdu as their first language.

== Notable people ==
National Awardee

- Gopal Prasad Sinha, Neurologist and Padma Shri awardee in field of Medicine & Candidate from Patna Sahib in 2014 general election.

Politician

- Gopal Prasad Sinha, Neurologist and Padma Shri awardee in field of Medicine & Candidate from Patna Sahib in 2014 general election.
- Lalmuni Chaubey, Ex-Member of Parliament, Buxar
- Jagada Nand Singh, Ex-Member of Parliament, Buxar
- Mahabali Singh, Ex-Member of Parliament, Karakat
- Manoj Tiwari, Singer & Member of Parliament North East Delhi
- Sudhakar Singh, RJD Member of Parliament Buxar

- Brij Kishor Bind, Former Minister in Sixth Nitish Kumar ministry
- Mohd Zama Khan, Minister in Seventh Nitish Kumar ministry.
- Sanjay Sinha, Ex-MP candidate Chandauli in the 2024 general election
- Dr.Ajay Alok, Ex-MLA Candidate, Chainpur in 2010 Bihar Assembly Election

Bureaucrats

- Ashutosh Tiwari, Civil Servant and Writer
- Kanish Kumar, Civil Servant (2025 Batch), Resident of Akhlaspur, Bhabhua
- Noor Alam, Civil Servant (2025 Batch), resident of Mohania
- Nitesh Kumar, Civil Servant (2024 Batch)

Artist

- Manoj Tiwari, Singer & Member of Parliament North East Delhi

== See also ==
- Districts of Bihar
