= Bharkhar =

- village
- Location in Bihar, India Bharkhar (India)
- Coordinates: 25°11′22″N 83°36′59″E
- Country: India
- State: Bihar
- District: Kaimur

Population
  - Total: 1,683(counted in 2,009)

Languages
  - Official: Bhojpuri, Hindi
- Time zone: UTC+5:30 (IST)
- Telephone code: code- 06189
- ISO 3166 code: IN-BR
- Vehicle registration: BR-24
- Coastline: 0 kilometres (0 mi)
- Nearest city: Mohania
- Literacy: more than 85%
- Climate: as usual (Köppen)
- Avg. summer temperature: 43 °C (109 °F)
- Avg. winter temperature: 14 °C (57 °F)
- Website: wikimapia.org/13378023/BHARKHAR

Bharkhar is a village near Mohania in the state of Bihar, India.

This densely populated village is situated at distance of 2 km north to the national highway NH-2 now NH 19 which is passing through near by place Mohania. It had a population of 1396 in May 2009 and as per one estimate in 2022, it has population more than 5000. The nearest railway station is Bhabua Road (Local Market is Known by name Mohania) 2 km away from the village.

It is also connected with state highways "SH-14" which is 1.5 km away. SH-14 is a state highway runs through Bhabua to Buxur. Places to visit includes highly revered temples Sri Mahavir Mandir situated at centre of village and Maa Kaali Mandir situated on SH-14, 1.5 km away from village. Both temples are highly revered, serene and well maintained place worth visiting. On day of Chhath puja, Maa Kaali Mandir on SH-14 attracts thousand visitors & worshipers.

This village has more than one connecting road to state highways, three government school, Panchayat Bhavan and public water supply system.

== Geography and climate ==
=== Geography ===
The total area of this village is 575 hectares.

=== Climate ===
Bharkhar experiences a humid subtropical climate with large variations between summer and winter temperatures. The temperature ranges between 22 and 46 °C (72 and 115 °F) in the summers. Winters in Bharkahar see very large diurnal variations, with warm days and downright cold nights. The dry summer starts in April and lasts until June, followed by the monsoon season from July to October. Cold waves from the Himalaya region cause temperatures to dip across the city in the winter from December to February and temperatures below 5 °C (41 °F) are not uncommon. Fog is common in the winters, while hot dry winds, called loo, blow in the summers. The average annual rainfall is 1,110 mm (44 in).

Climate data for Bharkhar
Month	Jan	Feb	Mar	Apr	May	Jun	Jul	Aug	Sep	Oct	Nov	Dec	Year
Mean daily maximum °C (°F)	23 (74)	26.6 (79.8)	32.6 (90.7)	37.9 (100.2)	40.8 (105.5)	38.4 (101.2)	33.1 (91.6)	31.6 (88.9)	32 (90)	32.1 (89.7)	27.9 (82.3)	24.0 (75.2)	31.7 (89.1)
Mean daily minimum °C (°F)	18.7 (65.6)	8.6 (47.5)	11.0 (51.8)	21 (70)	25.5 (77.9)	26.8 (80.3)	25.2 (77.3)	24.6 (76.2)	23.6 (74.5)	19.7 (67.5)	14.3 (57.7)	9.0 (48.2)	19.0 (66.2)
Average precipitation mm (inches)	20.2 (0.80)	20.7 (0.81)	14.2 (0.56)	6.6 (0.26)	11.1 (0.44)	116.3 (4.58)	298.2 (11.74)	329 (13.0)	181.5 (7.15)	45.2 (1.78)	11.5 (0.45)	3.6 (0.14)	1,057.9 (41.65)

== Transport ==
Bharkhar is well connected by air, rail and road with the major Indian cities like New Delhi, Mumbai, Kolkata, Chennai, Pune, Ahmedabad, Indore, Bhopal, Bhubaneswar, Gwalior, Jabalpur, Ujjain, Jaipur, Patna, Jamshedpur, Hyderabad etc. The village is 776 km from Delhi, 1240 km from Secunderabad.

=== Road ===
- National Highway 19 (NH 2 old) (GT Road): crosses through the nearby town Mohania
- National Highway 219 : originates from the nearby town Mohania and connect Bhabhua, Chainpur, Chand, Chandauli
- National Highway 319 (NH 30 old): originates from the nearby town Mohania and connect Dinara, Charpokhari, NH922 near Arrah (near capital Patna)
- National Highway 319A (SH-14): originates from the nearby town Mohania and connecting Ramgarh, Chausa and terminating at its junction with NH124C near Buxar

The Village is 180 km from Patna and 70 km from Varanasi by road.

=== Railway ===
The name of the nearest railway station is Bhabua Road railway station, situated on Howrah–Gaya–Mughalsarai–New Delhi Grand Cord line. The station code is "BBU".

=== Airport ===
Lal Bahadur Shastri International Airport, Varanasi, commonly known as Babatpur Airport, is the nearest airport, 75 km from Bharkahr. Indian carriers, including Air India, Kingfisher Airlines, Spicejet, and international carriers like Air India, Thai Airways International, Korean Air and Naaz Airlines operate from here.

== Education ==
This village can boast for having three government School.

== Worship places ==
- Sri Mahavir Mandir Situated at centre of the village
- Sri Kaali Mandir situated at SH-14, 1.5 km away
- Mundeshwari Temple, 30 km from Village near Bhabhua
