= Krishnapur =

Krishnapur may refer to:

== Places ==
=== India ===
- Kishunpur, a town in Fatehpur district, Uttar Pradesh
- Kishunpur (village), a village in Jaunpur district, Uttar Pradesh
- Krishnapur, Jaunpur, a village in Jaunpur district, Uttar Pradesh
- Uttar Krishnapur Part-I, a census town in the Cachar district of Assam
- Krishnapur, a village in Medak district, Telangana, India
- Krishnapura, Karnataka, a village in the Dakshina Kannada district, Karnataka
- Krishnapur (Vidhan Sabha constituency), a constituency for the Tripura Legislative Assembly
- Kishunpur (Vidhan Sabha constituency), a former constituency for the Bihar Legislative Assembly

==== West Bengal ====
- Kestopur or Krishnapur, a locality in Bidhannagar Municipal Corporation, West Bengal
- Krishnapur, West Bengal, a town in the Hooghly district of West Bengal
- Krishnapur, Murshidabad, a village in the Murshidabad district of West Bengal
- Krishnapur, Malda, a census town in Malda district of West Bengal
- Krishnapur, Mandirbazar, a village in South 24 Parganas district of West Bengal

=== Nepal ===
- Krishnapur, Nepal, a village development committee in the Kanchanpur District of Mahakali Zone
- Krishnapur Birta, a village development committee in the Siraha District of Sagarmatha Zone

== Other ==
- The Siege of Krishnapur, a novel by James Gordon Farrell
- Krishnapura matha, a matha one of the Ashta Mathas of Udupi in Udupi City, Karnataka
- Krishnapur massacre, during the 1971 Bangladesh genocide in then East Pakistan (now Bangladesh)

== See also ==
- Krishnapuram (disambiguation)
- Krishnapatnam
