= National Highway 2 (India, old numbering) =

Old numbering of road in India

National Highway 2

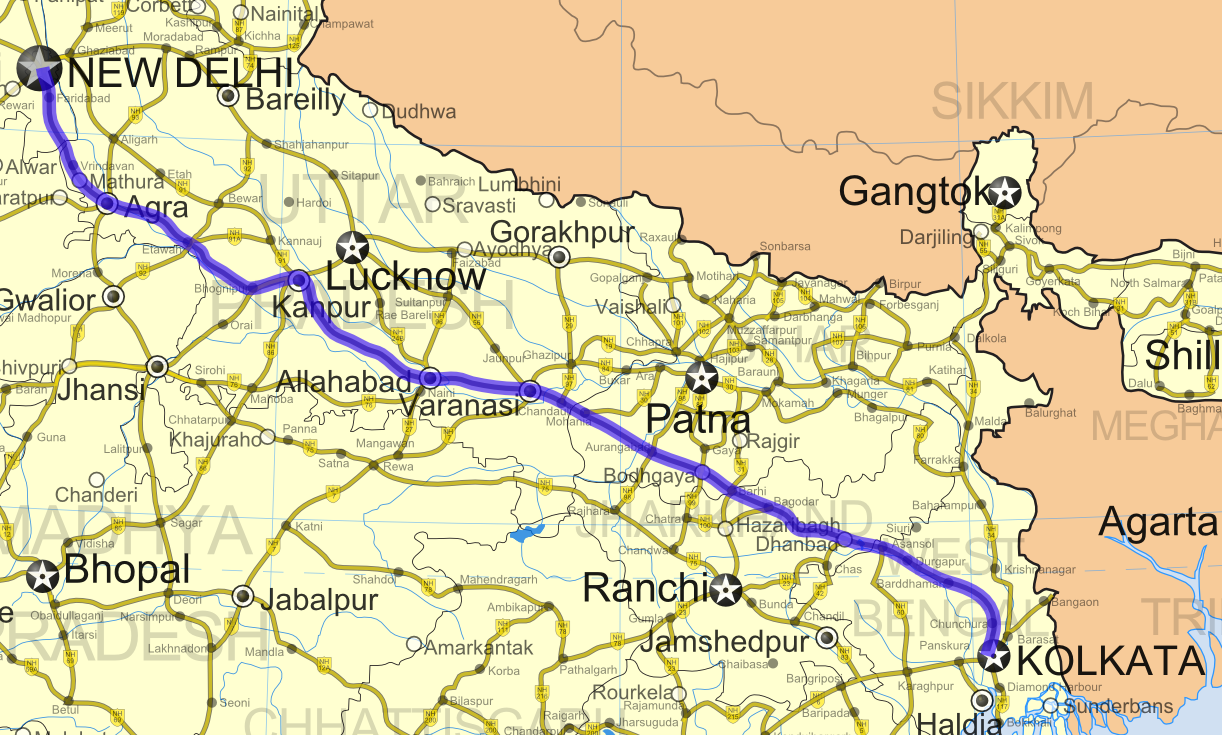
- Road map of India with National Highway 2 highlighted in solid blue color

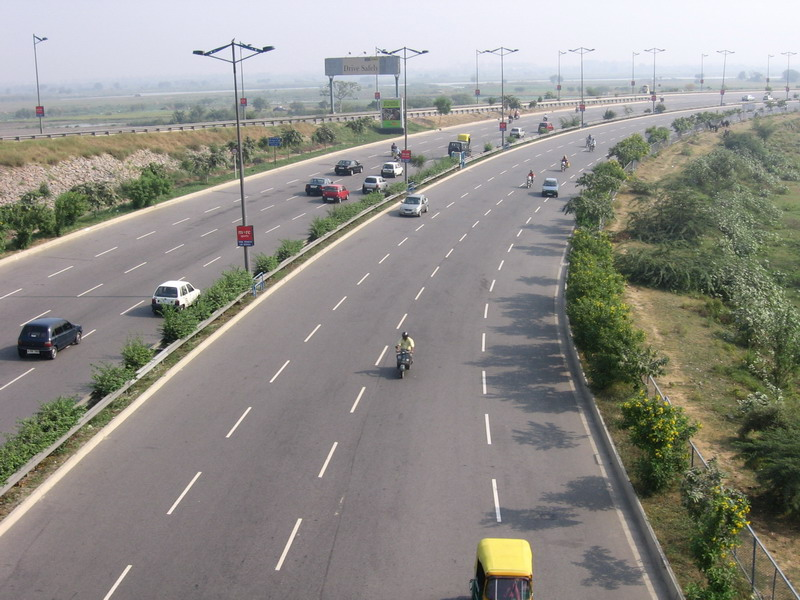

Route information
- Part of AH1
- Length: 1,465 km (910 mi) GQ: 1454 km (New Delhi – Kolkata); NS: 253 km (New Delhi – Agra); EW: 35 km (Barah – Kanpur)

Major junctions
- West end: New Delhi
- List: NH 1 in Delhi; NH 8 in Delhi; NH 10 in Delhi; NH 24 in Delhi; NH 3 in Agra; NH 11 in Agra; NH 93 in Agra; NH 92 in Etawah; NH 91A in Etawah; NH 2A in Sikandra; NH 25 in Kanpur; NH 86 in Kanpur; NH 91 in Kanpur; NH-2 in Fatehpur district; NH-28E in Fatehpur District; NH 24B in Allahabad; NH 27 in Allahabad; NH 76 in Allahabad; NH 96 in Allahabad; NH 7 in Varanasi; NH 29 in Varanasi; NH 56 in Varanasi; NH 97 in Saiyedraja; NH 30 in Mohania; NH 98 in Aurangabad; NH 83 in Dobhi; NH 31 in Barhi; NH 33 in Barhi; NH 100 in Bagodar; NH 32 in Gobindpur; NH 60 in Raniganj; NH 6 in Kolkata; NH 34 in Kolkata
- East end: Dankuni near Kolkata

Location
- Country: India
- States: Delhi: 12 km, Haryana: 74 km, Uttar Pradesh: 752 km, Bihar: 202 km, Jharkhand: 190 km, West Bengal: 235 km. It is also part of AH1 of Asian Highway Network, that traverses from Japan to Turkey.
- Primary destinations: New Delhi, Faridabad, Agra, Etawah, Auraiya, Akbarpur, Panki, Barra, Kidwai Nagar, Kanpur, Chakeri, Rooma, Maharajpur, Sarsaul, Bindki, Fatehpur district, Khaga, Kaushambi, Allahabad, Varanasi, Mughalsarai, Mohania, Barhi, Panagarh, Palsit

Highway system
- Roads in India; Expressways; National; State; Asian
← NH 1D	→ NH 2A

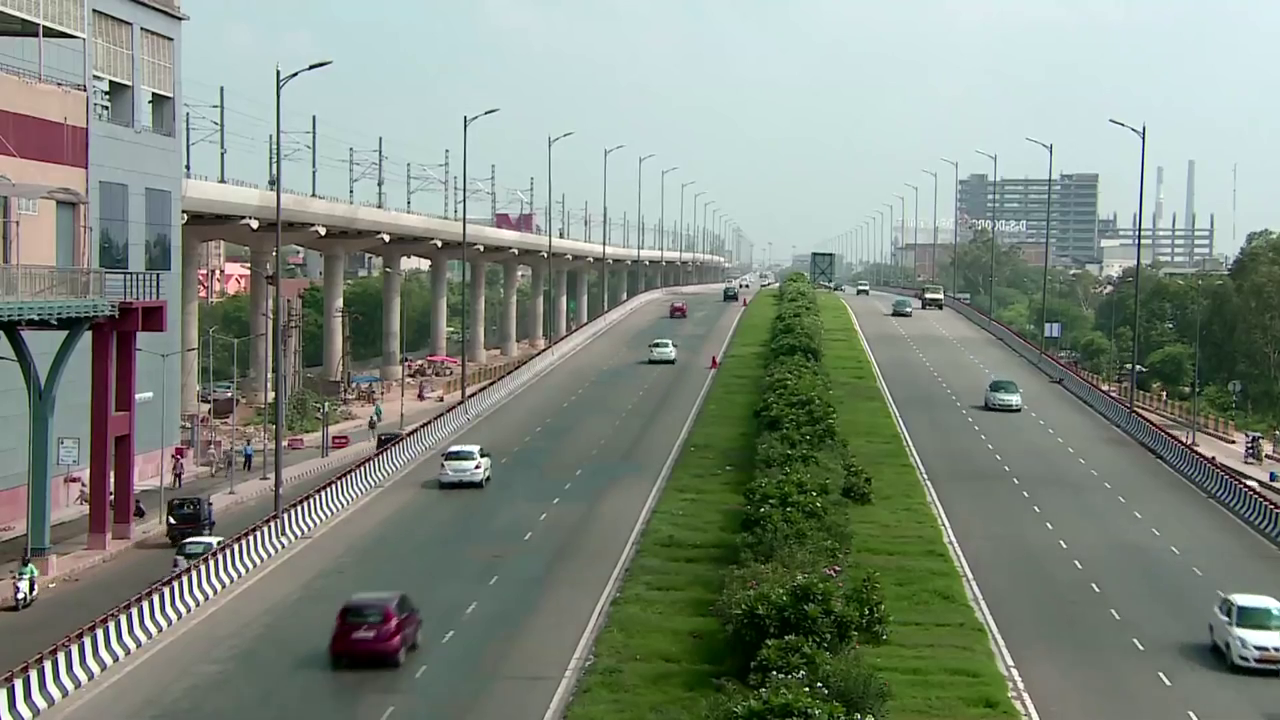
A view of Delhi–Faridabad Skyway, Delhi NCR

Old National Highway 2 or Old NH 2, (currently National Highway 19) was a major National Highway in India, that connected the union territory of Delhi and the states of Haryana, Uttar Pradesh, Bihar, Jharkhand and West Bengal. It constitutes a major portion of the historical Grand Trunk Road along with old NH 91 and old NH 1 in India. The highway connects national capital Delhi with Kolkata as well as important cities such as Faridabad, Mathura, Agra, Kanpur, Allahabad, Varanasi, Dhanbad, Asansol, Durgapur and Bardhaman.

== Renumbering ==
This NH has been renumbered as NH 19 and NH 44 after renumbering of all national highways by Ministry of Road Transport and Highways in 2010 and the old NH 2 number has ceased to exist. Now Delhi to Agra stretch is part of NH 44 and Agra to Kolkata stretch is NH 19.

== Route and length ==
The road was the part of National Highway network of India, and it is officially listed as running over 1,465 km. The kilometer counts in each of the states were Delhi (12), Haryana (74), Uttar Pradesh (752), Bihar (202), Jharkhand (190), West Bengal (235).

== In Haryana ==
NH 2 entered Haryana through Badarpur border at Delhi–Faridabad Skyway in Faridabad. It ran parallel to the Faridabad corridor of Delhi Metro and passed through Palwal before entering Uttar Pradesh.

== In Uttar Pradesh ==
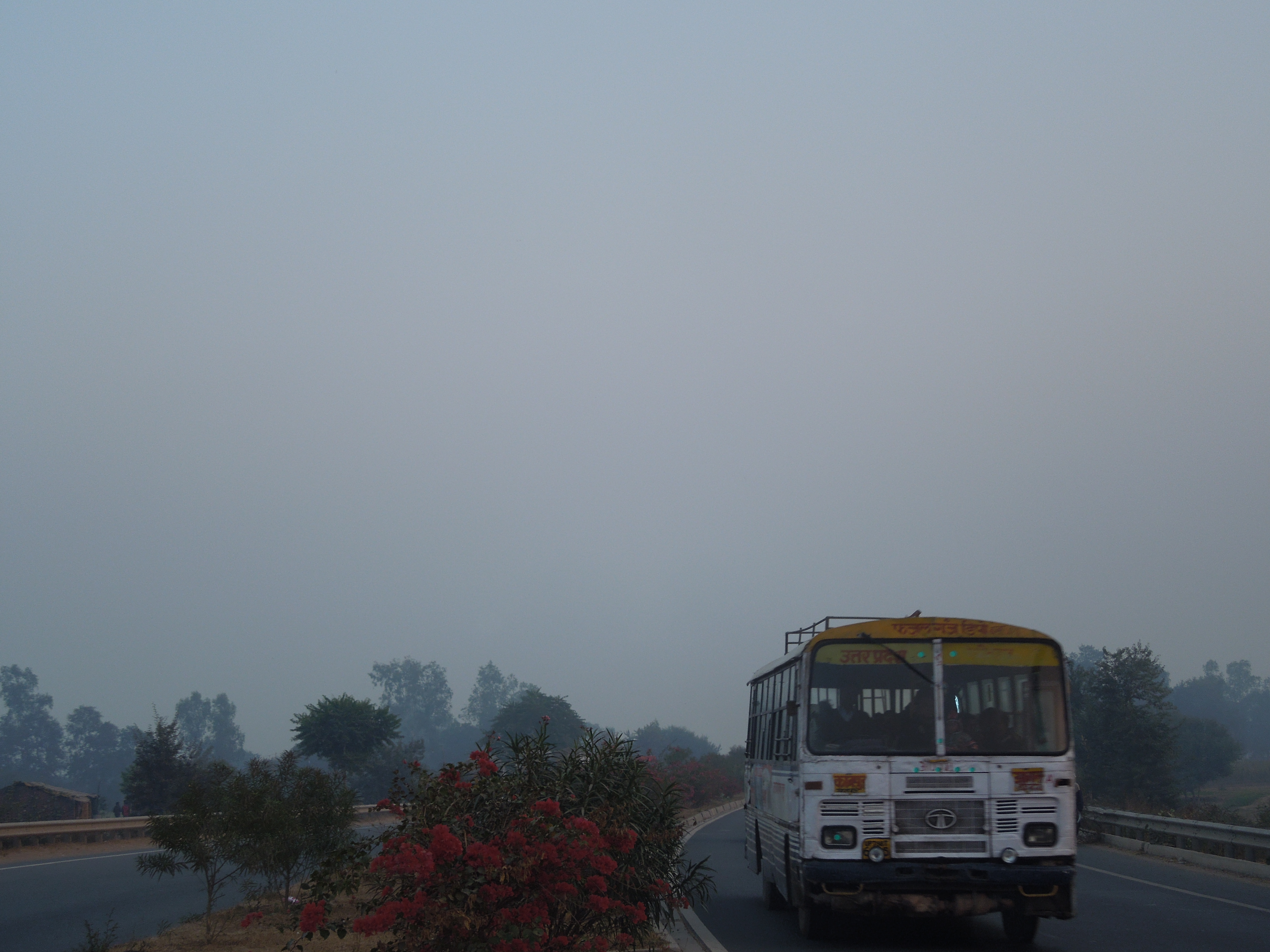
NH-2, Khaga, Fatehpur district, Uttar Pradesh

(West–east alignment) The National Highway 2 entered Uttar Pradesh from Haryana in Mathura district, and a part of it is known as Mathura Road. Before Mathura it covers Palwal and Faridabad city in Haryana. After Mathura it reaches Agra which is about 200 km (120 mi) In Agra it covers about 16 km (9.9 mi). After leaving Agra it enters in Firozabad district and then Etawah where 15 km bypass of city is made. After leaving Etawah it enters Kanpur city where a 23 km (14 mi) and 12 lane Kanpur over-bridge has been built which is also one of the largest over-bridges in Asia. In Kanpur it covers industrial belts (Akbarpur-Maharajpur) around 60 km (37 mi) and then it reaches Fatehpur district and covers 16 km (9.9 mi) area of Fatehpur, then it reaches Allahabad via Kaushambi and covers 16 km (9.9 mi) in city then reachesVaranasi-Mughalsarai covers 15 km (9.3 mi) and thus leaves U.P. This national highway has given a new life to public transport in Northern India. The overbridges built in Agra, Kanpur, Fatehpur and Allahabad have reduced city traffic problems. Allahabad Bypass Expressway is also the country's longest bypass section.

== In Bihar ==
(West–east alignment) The Bihar stretch of NH 2 starts from the bridge on the Karmanasa River that forms the border with Uttar Pradesh. NH 2 runs for 202 km in the state and then enters Jharkhand, between Dobhi and Chauparan, around Barachatti. In between it passes through Kaimur district. Mohania is the first major city on it. Also NH 30 is connected to In the city and leads to Patna city. The next city is Sasaram where there is the tomb of Great Emperor Sher Shah Suri. At Dehri- on-Son it crosses the wide expanse of the Sone River over the Jawahar Setu. At Dobhi it meets the road to Gaya and Patna (NH 83). NH 98 from Patna to Daltonganj crosses NH 2 at Aurangabad.

== In Jharkhand ==
(East–west alignment) The Jharkhand stretch of NH 2 extends from the bridge on the Barakar River on the Asansol-Nirsa bypass to around Barachatti, and runs for 190 kilometres (120 mi). Immediately after crossing into Jharkhand from West Bengal, NH2 meets the junction with the road on the north leading to Maithon and the road on the south leading to Panchet. NH 2 returns to old Grand Trunk Road at Nirsa. At Gobindpur NH 2 meets NH 32 leading to Dhanbad and Jamshedpur. At Topchanchi there is a picturesque lake, off NH2. Thereafter for a long stretch up to Isri the massive Parasnath Hills / Shikharji dominates on the northern side of NH 2. At Dumri, the road on the north leads to Madhuban and Giridih. The next important junction is Bagodar where NH 100 meets NH2. There is a road leading to Hazaribagh Road railway station. At Barhi is the crossing with NH31 and NH33. Between Chauparan and Dobhi, around Barachatti, NH 2 crosses over to Bihar. Much of the Jharkhand sector of NH 2 passes through an undulating area on Koderma Plateau.

== In West Bengal ==
(East–west alignment) The West Bengal end of NH 2 starts or terminates at Dankuni in the outskirts of Kolkata. There is a 6 kilometres (3.7 mi) stretch to the Nivedita Bridge, and thereafter Belghoria Expressway links it to Barrackpur Trunk Road, and Jessore Road/ NH 34. Alternatively, Kolkata bound traffic takes the NH 6 at Dankuni and then follows the Kona Expressway/NH 117 and Vidyasagar Setu to enter Kolkata.

The four-lane West Bengal portion of NH 2 stretches from Barakar to Dankuni and the entire stretch is complete. The 65 kilometres (40 mi) Dankuni-Palsit stretch is also known as Durgapur Expressway. From Palsit to the outskirts of Asansol it follows the old Grand Trunk Road bypassing such towns as Saktigarh, Bardhaman and Raniganj but passes through Durgapur and Andal. The Palsit–Panagarh stretch is 64 kilometres (40 mi) and the Panagarh–Raniganj stretch is 42 kilometres (26 mi). At Panagarh Darjeeling Mor NH 2 meets Panagarh–Morgram Highway. In the outskirts of Asansol NH 2 leaves Grand Trunk Road. The latter passes through crowded areas of Asansol, Neamatpur, Kulti and Barakar in West Bengal and Chirkunda and Kumardhubi in Jharkhand. A bypass links the outskirts of Asansol with Nirsa, where the NH 2 gets back to Grand Trunk Road. The Raniganj–Barakar stretch is 33 kilometres (21 mi). The widened 120 kilometres (75 mi) Panagarh–Dhanbad stretch was thrown open to traffic in 2001.

Construction cost of the 130 kilometres (81 mi) Panagarh–Dankuni section was 178 million US dollars. The entire stretch in West Bengal happens to be a toll zone. There are toll plazas at three places: Asansol, Palsit and Dankuni. Asansol toll plaza is now closed. Also a toll plaza is there at Banskopa near Durgapur.And a new toll booth has been established at Maithon More in Jharkhand, just a few kilometres after crossing the bridge on Barakar River. According to the NHAI's statistical record, in 2008 everyday about 850,000 to 900,000 vehicles plied between Barakar and Dankuni. The gross toll collection amounted to Rs 2,500,000 per day. Large number of buses ply along NH 2. South Bengal State Transport Corporation operates 47 buses between Durgapur and Kolkata alone. In 2008 South Bengal State Transport Corporation has started bus services between Burdwan and Kolkata.Both AC and non AC buses are available. There are around 50 buses. In 2011 Royal Express AC bus service was started between Burdwan and Kolkata.

== National Highways Development Project ==
- Almost all of the 1,465 km (910 mi) stretch of NH 2 has been selected as a part of the Golden Quadrilateral by the National Highways Development Project.
- Approximately 253 km (157 mi) stretch of NH 2 between Delhi and Agra has been selected as a part of the North–South Corridor by the National Highways Development Project.
- Approximately 35 km (22 mi) stretch of NH 2 between Barah and Kanpur has been selected as a part of the East–West Corridor by the National Highways Development Project.
- Six Laning of 180 km-long Delhi-Agra stretch of NH-2 under NHDP phase-V by NHAI through its concessionaire Reliance Infrastructure

== See also ==
- List of national highways in India
- National Highways Development Project
