= Madaria, Gorakhpur =

Madaria
- village
- Location in Uttar Pradesh, India
- Coordinates: 26°18′N 83°24′E
- Country: India
- State: Uttar Pradesh
- District: Gorakhpur

Population (2011)
  - Total: 1,473

Languages
  - Official: Hindi
- Time zone: UTC+5:30 (IST)

Madaria is a village in Gola Block and Tehsil (sub-district) of Gorakhpur district in the Indian State of Uttar Pradesh. The total geographical area of the village is 75.21 hectares. The village has 247 households. The village has a post office and Gram Panchayat. The native language is Hindi. Madaria is located 61.1 km from Gorakhpur and 7 km from sub-district headquarters Gola Bazar.

== Demographics ==
The village has a population of 1473 of which 728 are males while 745 are females as per Population Census 2011. The number of children between ages 0-6 is 174 which makes up 11.81% of the total population of the village. The average sex ratio of Madaria village is 1023, which is higher than Uttar Pradesh state average of 912.

== Education and literacy ==
Madaria has one govt primary school. The nearest govt secondary schools are VSAV Inter College (Gola), Umashankar Tiwari SMA BA Inter College (Mannipur Gola), Kailashi Devi HSS B Par (Gola), Govt High School Gopalpur (Gola), and Baithwal Sanskrit Mahavidayalay (Gola). The literacy rate of Madaria is slightly better than that of the state. In 2011, the literacy rate of the village was 69.45% compared to 67.68% of Uttar Pradesh. Male literacy stands at 80.76% while female literacy rate was 58.38%.

== Economy and employment ==
Around 17.13% of workers describe their work as Main Work (Employment or Earning more than 6 Months) while 82.87% were involved in Marginal activity providing livelihood for less than 6 months. Of 689 workers engaged in Main Work, 58 were cultivators (owner or co-owner) while 8 were Agricultural labourer, according to the Census Data. The village has one branch of UCO Bank, a Post Office, a BSNL Telephone Exchange.

== Nearby villages ==
The surrounding nearby villages located within 4 km and their respective distance from Madaria are as follows:

Nearby villages
Village	Distance
Barhaj Ahatamali	0.8 km
Kalhipar	1.3 km
Chhitauna Bujurg	1.6 km
Parasia	1.9 km
Bharroh	2.0 km
Dadra	2.0 km
Devakali	2.4 km
Devlapar	2.9 km
Anand Garh	3.4 km
Rajahata	3.5 km
Newaijpar	3.5 km
Surdapar Raja	4.0 km

== Nearby Towns/Cities ==
- Gola
- Kauriram
- Barhalganj
- Ghosi
- Dohrighat
- Mau
- Azamgarh
