= Rooma =

- town
- Nickname: Textile City of Uttar Pradesh
- Location in Uttar Pradesh, India Rooma (India)
- Coordinates: 26.46°N 80.32°E
- Country: India
- State: Uttar Pradesh
- District: Kanpur Nagar

Government
  - Type: Municipality
  - Body: Rooma/Chakeri Municipality

Area
  - Total: 7.21 km^{2} (2.78 sq mi)
- Elevation: 123 m (404 ft)

Population (2011)
  - Total: 9,868
  - Density: 1,647/km^{2} (4,270/sq mi)

Languages
  - Official: Hindi
- Time zone: UTC+5:30 (IST)
- PIN: 209 402
- Vehicle registration: UP-78
- Nearest city: Kanpur
- Literacy: 85%
- Lok Sabha constituency: Akbarpur (Lok Sabha constituency)
- Vidhan Sabha constituency: Maharajpur
- Civic agency: Rooma/Chakeri Municipality/ward-10/Zone-2
- Website: up.gov.in

Rooma is a satellite town situated about 20 kilometres east of Kanpur, India and a major industrial and institutional centre on Kanpur–Allahabad Highway of National Highway 19. It is one of the major towns enlisted in Kanpur metropolitan area.

== Economy ==
There are many industries situated in the U.P.S.I.D.C. developing area. Many automotive showrooms are located on NH-2 National Highway 19. Rooma has immense potential to be developed as major industrial city in Uttar Pradesh as the Eastern Dedicated Freight Corridor passes from here and Rooma has its own railway station on the corridor.

Textile Park

The Project has been set up on 173 acres of land on National Highway No.2 (Kanpur-Allahabad Section). Facilities like Training Centre, Fashion Design Centre, CETP, etc. for textile units in the area has been set up in the project.

Leather Complex

UPSIDC has developed a leather goods complex along with township at Rooma.

New Rooma Industrial Estate

UPSIDC has planned to develop a new industrial estate named as New Rooma Industrial Estate to give fuel to small scale industries.

== Education ==
Rooma is one of the educational hubs in Kanpur, having a number of Engg. Institutes like Kanpur Institute of Technology, AXIS Colleges, Allenhouse Group, Vision Institute of Technology, Mount Litera Zee School etc.

== Tourist attractions ==
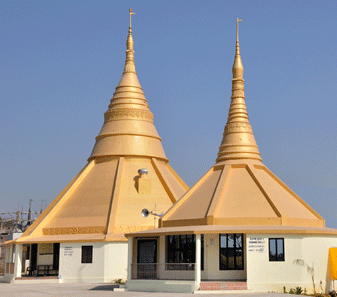
A meditation center situated at near Ema at Rooma

- Radha-Swami Asram
- Habiba Masjid, Jajmau
- Jajmau Tila
- Dhamma Kalyana International Meditation Centre, Dhorighat
- Beramh Dev Temple
- Balaji Mandir, Salempur Mod
- Baradwari Temple, Rooma NH 19

== Transport ==
Road

National Highway 19 (old number:NH 2) which connects Delhi with Dankuni near Kolkata passes from Rooma. Rooma has a bus stop near the highway and buses for major cities like Kanpur, Allahabad, Agra, Mathura, Faridabad, Jaipur etc. are easily available here. Kanpur Metropolitan Bus Service has bus routes from Rooma to different parts of Kanpur city and metropolitan area. Multinational cab companies like Ola and Uber have their services in Rooma.

Railways

Rooma (RXM) has a railway station on Delhi–Howrah main line but only passenger trains and Lichchavi Express halt here. There is a proposal to convert Rooma into terminal station as it is developing at very fast rate. Sarsaul Railway Station which has some express/mail trains stoppage is 10 km from here and Kanpur Central Railway Station is 14 km from here.

Airways

Kanpur Airport is the nearest airport connected with major domestic destinations in India and is proposed to be an international airport in near future.
