= NH 119 =

NH 119 may refer to:

- National Highway 119 (India)
- New Hampshire Route 119, United States
