= Mohania =

Mohania Rasulpur, Islamganj, Satuarganj
- City
- Location in Bihar, India
- Coordinates: 25°10′04″N 83°37′08″E
- Country: India
- State: Bihar
- District: Kaimur (Bhabua)
- Established: 1550
- Elevation: 76 m (249 ft)

Population (2011)
  - Total: 13,910

Languages
  - Official: Hindi
  - Regional: Bhojpuri
- Time zone: UTC+5:30 (IST)
- PIN: 821109
- Telephone code: 91-6187
- Vehicle registration: BR-45
- Website: kaimur.bih.nic.in

Mohania is a city and corresponding community development block in Kaimur district of Bihar, India. It serves as headquarters for the Mohania sub-division in Kaimur district. It is 17 km (11 mi) by road north of the city of Bhabua, at the intersection of National Highway 19 (old NH-2), NH-219, and NH-319. The bank of the Durgavati River is just to the south of Mohania. The total block population was 218,479, in 32,198 households.

Mohania is the hub of transport routes in Kaimur district. The famous temple Mundeshawari Devi is situated in Kaimur district.

== Geography and climate ==
=== Geography ===
The total area of Mohania block is 28,426.6 hectares (70,244 acres).

=== Climate ===
Mohania experiences a humid subtropical climate with large variations between summer and winter temperatures. The temperature ranges between 22 and 46 °C (72 and 115 °F) in the summers. Winters in Mohania see very large diurnal variations, with warm days and downright cold nights. The dry summer starts in April and lasts until June, followed by the monsoon season from July to October. Vk Cold waves from the Himalayan region cause temperatures to dip across the city in the winter from December to February and temperatures below 5 °C (41 °F) are not uncommon. Fog is common in the winters, while hot dry winds, called loo, blow in the summers. The average annual rainfall is 1,110 mm (44 in).

Climate data for Mohania
Month	Jan	Feb	Mar	Apr	May	Jun	Jul	Aug	Sep	Oct	Nov	Dec	Year
Mean daily maximum °C (°F)	23 (74)	26.6 (79.8)	32.6 (90.7)	37.9 (100.2)	40.8 (105.5)	38.4 (101.2)	33.1 (91.6)	31.6 (88.9)	32 (90)	32.1 (89.7)	27.9 (82.3)	24.0 (75.2)	31.7 (89.1)
Mean daily minimum °C (°F)	18.7 (65.6)	8.6 (47.5)	11.0 (51.8)	21 (70)	25.5 (77.9)	26.8 (80.3)	25.2 (77.3)	24.6 (76.2)	23.6 (74.5)	19.7 (67.5)	14.3 (57.7)	9.0 (48.2)	19.0 (66.2)
Average precipitation mm (inches)	20.2 (0.80)	20.7 (0.81)	14.2 (0.56)	6.6 (0.26)	11.1 (0.44)	116.3 (4.58)	298.2 (11.74)	329 (13.0)	181.5 (7.15)	45.2 (1.78)	11.5 (0.45)	3.6 (0.14)	1,057.9 (41.65)

== Transport ==
Mohania is well connected by air, rail and road with the major Indian cities like New Delhi, Mumbai, Kolkata, Chennai, Pune, Ahmedabad, Indore, Bhopal, Bhubaneswar, Gwalior, Jabalpur, Ujjain, Jaipur, Patna, Jamshedpur, Hyderabad etc. The town is 776 km (482 mi) from Delhi and 1,240 km (770 mi) from Secunderabad. One of the major factors in Mohania's sustained existence as an inhabited city is its role as an established transportation hub between different cities. It is a subdivisional town in Kaimur district. The district headquarters, Bhabua, is 14 km (8.7 mi) southward from the railway station.

=== Road ===
- National Highway 19 (NH 2 old) (GT Road): crosses through the heart of the city.
- National Highway 219 : originates from the city and connect Bhabhua, Chainpur, Chand, Chandauli
- National Highway 319 (NH 30 old): originates from this city and connect Dinara, Charpokhari, NH-922 near Arrah.
- National Highway 319A (SH-14): originates from this city and connecting Ramgarh, Chausa and terminating at its junction with NH124C near Buxar.

The town is 180 km (110 mi) from Patna and 60 km (37 mi) from Varanasi by road.
Earlier state highway SH-14 was connected to Buxar via Ramgarh from the south and with Bhabua (District capital, [Audhaura, Bhagwanpur) from the south.

=== Railway ===
The name of the railway station of Mohania is Bhabua Road railway station, situated on Howrah–Gaya–Mughalsarai–New Delhi Grand Cord line. The station code is "BBU".

=== Airport ===
Lal Bahadur Shastri International Airport, Varanasi, commonly known as Babatpur Airport, is the nearest airport, 71 km (44 mi) from Mohania. Indian carriers, including Air India, Kingfisher Airlines, Spicejet, and international carriers like Air India, Thai Airways International, Korean Air and Naaz Airlines operate from here.

== Education ==
Schools include Jawahar Navodaya Vidyalaya, Chaurasia, Ramgarh Road

== Worship places ==
- Mundeshwari Temple, 20 km (12 mi) from nearest city Bhabhua
- Hanuman Mandir Station Road
- Sati Mai Temple near railway station
- Hanuman Mandir at Chandani Chowk

== Near by Visiting places ==
- Mundeshwari Temple at a distance of 30 km (19 mi)
- Telhar Kund, at a distance of 48 km (30 mi)
- Karkat Waterfall at a distance of 48 km (30 mi)
- Jagdahwa Dam at a distance of 40 km (25 mi)

== Misc ==
- Big Bazaar
- LIC India

== Villages ==
Mohania block contains the following 208 villages:

Village name	Total land area (hectares)	Population (in 2011)
Piparia	265	2,530
Mehro	130	2,420
Bhadaulia	39	792
Mobarakpur	87	2,132
Kanauli	46	0
Akorhi	157	2,047
Usari	331	2,931
Anantpur	51	360
Sadatpur	53	530
Kekrha	98	1,263
Dewkali	147	2,568
Mohania (block headquarters)	520	13,910
Baspurwa	24	0
Danialpur Kurai	177	1,466
Rasulpur Karmahri	137	2,567
Bharkhar	575	5,764
Bhankhanpur	91	304
Raipuria	47	0
Kurra	257	2,072
Lodia	32	0
Doghara	142	989
Patti	54	398
Narwat	48	0
Dewkharia	38	0
Karanpura	49	0
Aladahi	112	738
Hasanpura	26	617
Bhawanipur	18	0
Jigina	139	1,324
Lurpurwa	155	1,036
Edilpur	46	364
Berra	189	915
Jatalia	16	0
Chhata	139	0
Akorhi	70	1,588
Maniarpur	73	0
Dumarpokhar	346	1,300
Siapokhar	342	1,487
Rajiabandh	121	738
Jagarnathpur	41	0
Tulshipur	55	561
Harakhpura	30	0
Gangdaspur	28	0
Bamhaurkhas	438	3,249
Bamhaur Panre	234	1,407
Barahiya	257	118
Naseja	109	0
Sareya	141	615
Barhupar	1,211	6,461
Sahijana	86	314
Dhanattarpur	47.2	0
Lakhanpatti	210	109
Barkakatra	208	5,615
Katra Bahuara	137	868
Bardehri	50	0
Kormahri	294	1,751
Baghni	448	2,809
Narsinghpur	115	11
Ismailpur	24	305
Sakrauli	252	1,814
Telanga	216	597
Karsaria	101	410
Kaithiya	100	738
Chotka Katra	97	984
Binodpur	125	272
Naraura	195	990
Semaria	154	409
Lahuribari	106	1,297
Mujan	444	4,333
Dharampura	27.1	0
Dandwas	359	2,870
Ganr Sarai	62.2	0
Semaria	141	0
Chhotki Kulharia	234	1,655
Barki Kulharia	172	543
Khajhra	137	1,171
Keshopur	130	1,149
Chhapri	84	111
Dia	179	1,403
Arazi Bhokhari	48	0
Sarai	190	1,004
Bahdura	134	48
Mankawatia	108	550
Bhokhari	252	1,558
Khudar Gaura	52	549
Gaura	165	919
Bhatauli	116	1,164
Karta	19	0
Panserwa	98	1,352
Bhirkhira	143	965
Hardeiya	128	0
Baraitha	148	1,538
Belahri	96	906
Laria	89	877
Hardaspur	32	156
Lorpurwa	29	249
Sarai	110	544
Baishpurwa	17	0
Tekari	180	1,420
Bhoganda	28	0
Jonhiya	148	0
Bhagirathpur	68	445
Nawada	47	0
Shondhi	149	1,466
Torwa	49	341
Mohammadpur	123	796
Atraulia	30	0
Arra	183	860
Panapur	208	2,080
Arazi Arra	22	0
Dasoti	289	2,033
Patilwa	146	541
Bahdura	100	470
Kishunipur	83	0
Mallupur	42	0
Baghni	515	4,189
Ahinaura	372	2,497
Turkaulia	62.7	774
Lakhmipur	62	583
Patserwa	42.7	698
Kutbanpur	53	0
Atia	21.7	0
Bairi	88	0
Chheria	94	0
Chordehra	78	384
Tikaitpur	53	55
Dubaulia	36	0
Harnathpur	112	698
Bahera	16	0
Jirhulia	57	0
Kankaulia	18.5	0
Adhwar	203	1,534
Sarahula	158	886
Suara	38.9	0
Khairi	74.8	0
Bishunpura	45	722
Dalopur	33.8	271
Dulahpur	56	569
Bahera	15	155
Bhaluhi	119	521
Marha	52	0
Maricha	204	980
Gaharpura	29.4	0
Siriari	52.8	0
Parashurampur	94	1,221
Chandwa	102.9	292
Panre Pipra	59	4486
Kabirajpur	63.8	289
Nawagawan	63.9	253
Chaube Deharia	51.9	0
Dube Deharia	42	104
Chhitbisawan	72.8	0
Tiwari Deharia	41.9	247
Panre Deharia	99.1	714
Rampur	91.3	740
Samahuta	215.2	2,207
Khudra	47.1	77
Jitapur	86	1,259
Horilpur	35	150
Khajepur	44	0
Narayanpur	63.1	0
Shukul Pipra	68	157
Rajpur	44	730
Adhvani	109.2	826
Misraulia	89	223
Bairi	96	966
Dadar	490	3,986
Paspipra	124	956
Sukhpurwa	109	923
Pipra Gareri	94	195
Kathej	490	4,471
Majhari	396	3,448
Mamade	203	2,597
Sariawan	106	538
Gheghiya	250	1,557
Bhundi Tekari	133	1,140
Checharia	160	8
Darwan	324	7,096
Kanhiya	19	1,334
Barej	299	3,246
Amarpura	149	2,219
Belaunri	122	5,824
Kauriram	204	2,269
Pakrihar	228	1,835
Tiyara	44	120
Muthani	161	2,285
Dewaria	149	1,381
Rasulpur	43	0
Ameth	254	3,234
Sarayan	40	520
Barka Sagra	179	974
Murharia	98	1,003
Patelwa	56.2	1,346
Atraulia	179	1,376
Kewrhi	93	128
Mamrezpur, Kaimur	83	483
Bhitti	143	3,704
Pandepur	82	7
Barhuli	149	1,314
Karigawan	95	1,082
Bhopatpur	56	897
Bhopatpur, Kaimur (census code 249501)	69	0
Pusauli	197	1,910
Shahbazpur	306.4	2,452
Machhanhat	145	439
Katra Arazi English	408	764
Barhaulia	208	0
Sagarpur	112	341
