= Tilsahri =

Tilsahari
- town
- Location in Uttar Pradesh, India Tilsahari (India)
- Coordinates: 26°20′0″N 80°25′0″E
- Country: India
- State: Uttar Pradesh
- District: Kanpur

Government
  - Type: Municipal corporation
  - Body: Nagar Palika
- Elevation: 122 m (400 ft)

Languages
  - Official: Hindi
- Time zone: UTC+5:30 (IST)
- Postal code: 209402
- Vehicle registration: UP-78
- Coastline: 0 kilometres (0 mi)
- Website: up.gov.in

Tilsahari is a town in Kanpur district in the state of Uttar Pradesh, India. Nearby towns include Narwal and Maharajpur, 10 km north and 7 km west respectively.

== Geography ==
Tilsahri is located at 26°20′0″N 80°25′0″E. It has an average elevation of 122 meters (403 feet).

== Mass transit ==
The airport servicing the area is C A Kanpur Airport. Rail connection is supplied by Kanpur Central Railway Station.

== Sources ==
- "Tilsahri". india9.com. Archived from the original on 6 June 2011.
