= Krishnapuram =

Krishnapuram may refer to places in India:

- Krishnapuram, Vizianagaram district, Andhra Pradesh
- Krishnapuram, Krishna district, Andhra Pradesh
- Krishnapuram, Alappuzha district, Kerala
- Krishnapuram, Thrissur, Kerala
- Krishnapuram, Thanjavur district, Tamil Nadu
- Krishnapuram, Virudhunagar district, Tamil Nadu
- Krishnapuram - the original name of village Krushnur in Nanded District of Maharashtra

== See also ==
- Krishnapur (disambiguation)
