= Gola Bazar =

Gola Bazar may refer to:

- Gola Bazar, Bihar
- Gola Bazar, Uttar Pradesh
