= Usha Maurya =

Indian politician

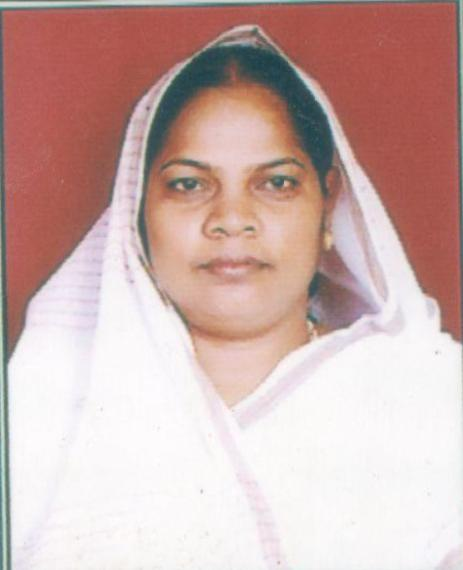

Member of Uttar Pradesh Legislative Assembly
- Incumbent
- Assumed office 2022
- Preceded by: Ranvendra Pratap Singh
- Constituency: Husainganj

Personal details
- Party: Indian National Congress (2007-2021); Samajwadi Party (2021-Current)
- Spouse: Munna Lal Maurya

Usha Maurya also known as Anila Maurya is an Indian politician. She was elected to Husainganj in the 2022 Uttar Pradesh Legislative Assembly election as a member of the Samajwadi Party.
