= Khaga Assembly constituency =

Constituency of the Uttar Pradesh legislative assembly in India

Khaga
- Constituency No. 243 for the Uttar Pradesh Legislative Assembly

Constituency details
- Country: India
- Region: North India
- State: Uttar Pradesh
- District: Fatehpur
- Total electors: 3,42,812 (2022)
- Reservation: SC

Member of Legislative Assembly
- 18th Uttar Pradesh Legislative Assembly
- Incumbent Krishna Paswan
- Party: Bharatiya Janata Party
- Elected year: 2022

Khaga is a constituency of the Uttar Pradesh Legislative Assembly covering the city of Khaga in the Fatehpur district of Uttar Pradesh, India.

Khaga is one of six assembly constituencies in the Fatehpur Lok Sabha constituency. Since 2008, this assembly constituency is numbered 243 amongst 403 constituencies.

== Wards/Areas ==
It contains these parts of Fatehpur district- Khaga, Vijayipur, Khakhareru(NP), Dhata(NP), Khaga (NP) & Kishunpur (NP) of Khaga Tehsil.

== Elected MLAs ==
Year	Name	Party
1962	Raksha Pal Singh	Jana Sangh
1967	Chandra Kishore	Republican Party of India
1969	Krishna Dutt	Indian National Congress
1974	Krishna Dutt	Indian National Congress
1977	Chhotey Lal	Janata Party
1980	Krishna Dutt	Indian National Congress (I)
1985	Krishna Dutt	Indian National Congress
1989	Veer Abhimanyu Singh	Janata Dal
1991	Krishna Kumar	Janata Dal
1993	Veer Abhimanyu Singh	Samajwadi Party
1996	Munna Lal Maurya	Bahujan Samaj Party
2002	Mohammad Shafir	Bahujan Samaj Party
2007	Ranvendra Pratap Singh	Bharatiya Janata Party
2012	Krishna Paswan	Bharatiya Janata Party
2017	Krishna Paswan	Bharatiya Janata Party
2022	Krishna Paswan	Bharatiya Janata Party

== Election results ==
=== 2027 ===
2027 Uttar Pradesh Legislative Assembly election: Khaga
Party	Candidate	Votes	%	±%
INDIA				
NDA				
BSP				
NOTA	None of the above			
Majority				
Turnout				
gain from		Swing		

=== 2022 ===
2022 Uttar Pradesh Legislative Assembly election: Khaga
Party	Candidate	Votes	%	±%
BJP	Krishna Paswan	83,735	41.87	−9.58
SP	Ramthirth Paramhans	78,226	39.12	
BSP	Dasharath Lal	22,115	11.06	−9.72
INC	Om Prakash Gihar	3,773	1.89	−18.98
CPI	Ram Krishna Hegde	2,171	1.09	−1.24
NOTA	None of the above	2,162	1.08	−1.02
Majority		5,509	2.75	−27.83
Turnout		199,986	58.34	+1.3
BJP hold		Swing		

=== 2017 ===
2017 Uttar Pradesh Legislative Assembly election: Khaga
Party	Candidate	Votes	%	±%
BJP	Krishna Paswan	94,954	51.45	
INC	Om Prakash Gihar	38,520	20.87	
BSP	Dasharath Lal	38,359	20.78	
CPI	Heera Lal	4,293	2.33	
RLD	Rajesh Rao	2,846	1.54	
BMP	Anil Kumar	1,798	0.97	
NOTA	None of the above	3,801	2.1	
Majority		56,434	30.58	
Turnout		184,571	57.04	
BJP hold		Swing		
