= Majhari =

Majhari Majhāri
- Village
- Location in Bihar, India Majhari (India)
- Coordinates: 25.16232°N 83.66734°E
- Country: India
- State: Bihar
- District: Kaimur

Area
  - Total: 3.96 km^{2} (1.53 sq mi)
- Elevation: 83 m (272 ft)

Population (2011)
  - Total: 3,448
  - Density: 871/km^{2} (2,260/sq mi)

Languages
  - Official: Bhojpuri, Hindi
- Time zone: UTC+5:30 (IST)

Majhari is a village in Mohania block of Kaimur district, Bihar, India. As of 2011, its population was 3,448, in 505 households.
