= Darwan, India =

Darwan Darwān
- Village
- Location in Bihar, India Darwan (India)
- Coordinates: 25.17135°N 83.62632°E
- Country: India
- State: Bihar
- District: Kaimur

Area
  - Total: 3.24 km^{2} (1.25 sq mi)
- Elevation: 82 m (269 ft)

Population (2011)
  - Total: 7,096
  - Density: 2,190/km^{2} (5,670/sq mi)

Languages
  - Official: Bhojpuri, Hindi
- Time zone: UTC+5:30 (IST)

Darwan is a large village in Mohania block of Kaimur district, Bihar, India. It is located immediately north of Mohania, with the two being separated by the Grand Chord railway tracks. As of 2011, its population was 7,096, in 1,083 households.
