= Gola Gokaran Nath Temple =

Hindu Temple in Uttar Pradesh, India

- गोला गोकर्णनाथ मंदिर
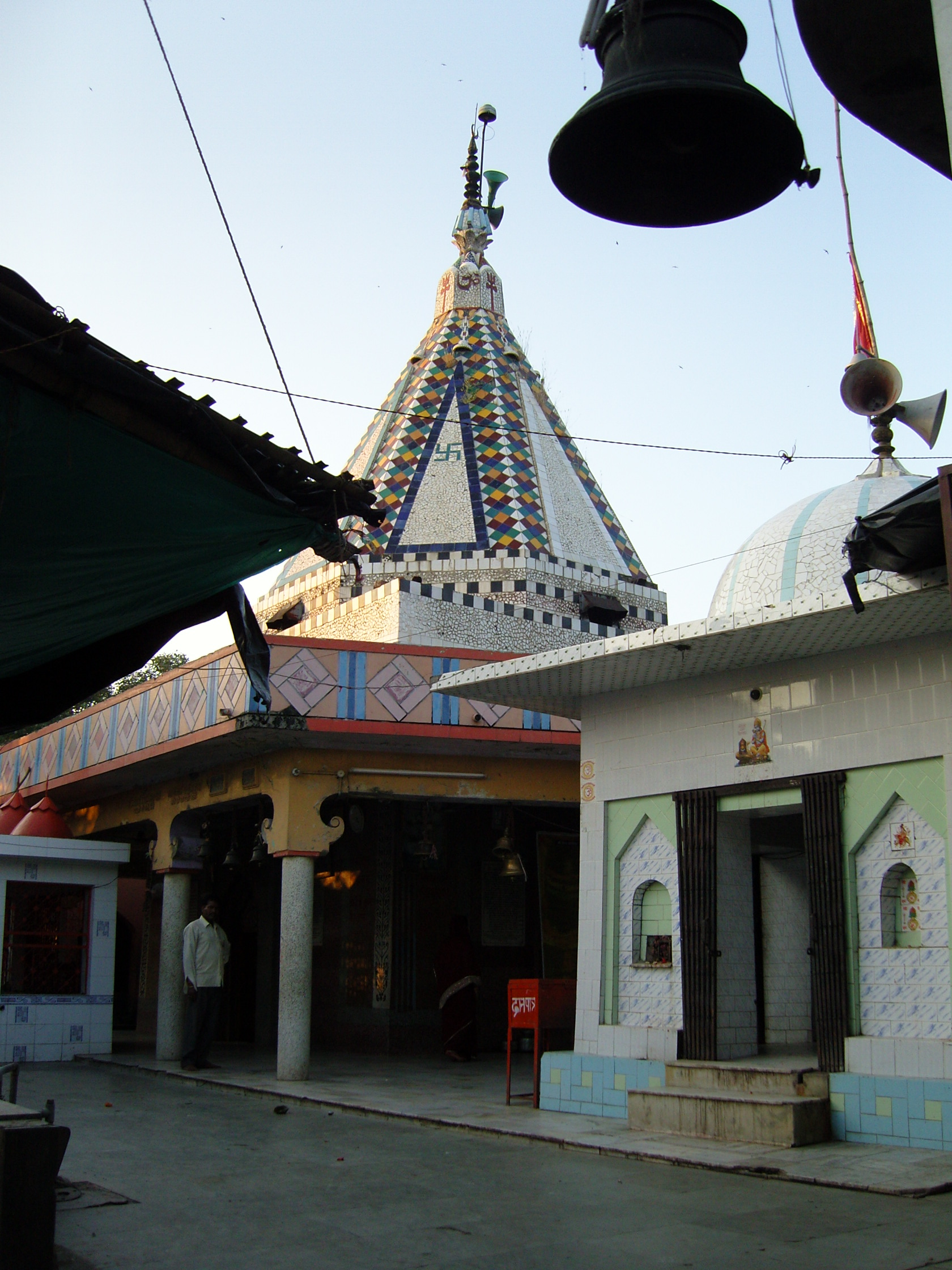
- Shiva Temple (शिव मन्दिर), Gola

- Location in Uttar Pradesh Gola Gokaran Nath Temple (India)

Religion
- Affiliation: Hinduism
- District: Lakhimpur district
- Deity: Shiva
- Festivals: Maha Shivratri, Sawan Month

Location
- Location: Gola Gokarannath
- State: Uttar Pradesh
- Country: India
- Coordinates: 28.13°N 80.76°E

Architecture
- Type: North Indian Style

Gola Gokaran Nath Temple is a Hindu temple in Gola Gokarannath, Uttar Pradesh, India, and is also known as Shiva temple of Gola Gokaran Nath. It is a temple to Shiva. The Gola Gokaran Nath is also called Uttar Gokaran Kshetrainga in Gola Gokarnath is the only Shivlinga in the world which is shaped like a cow's ear.

== Photo gallery of Chhoti Kashi (Shiv Nagari) ==
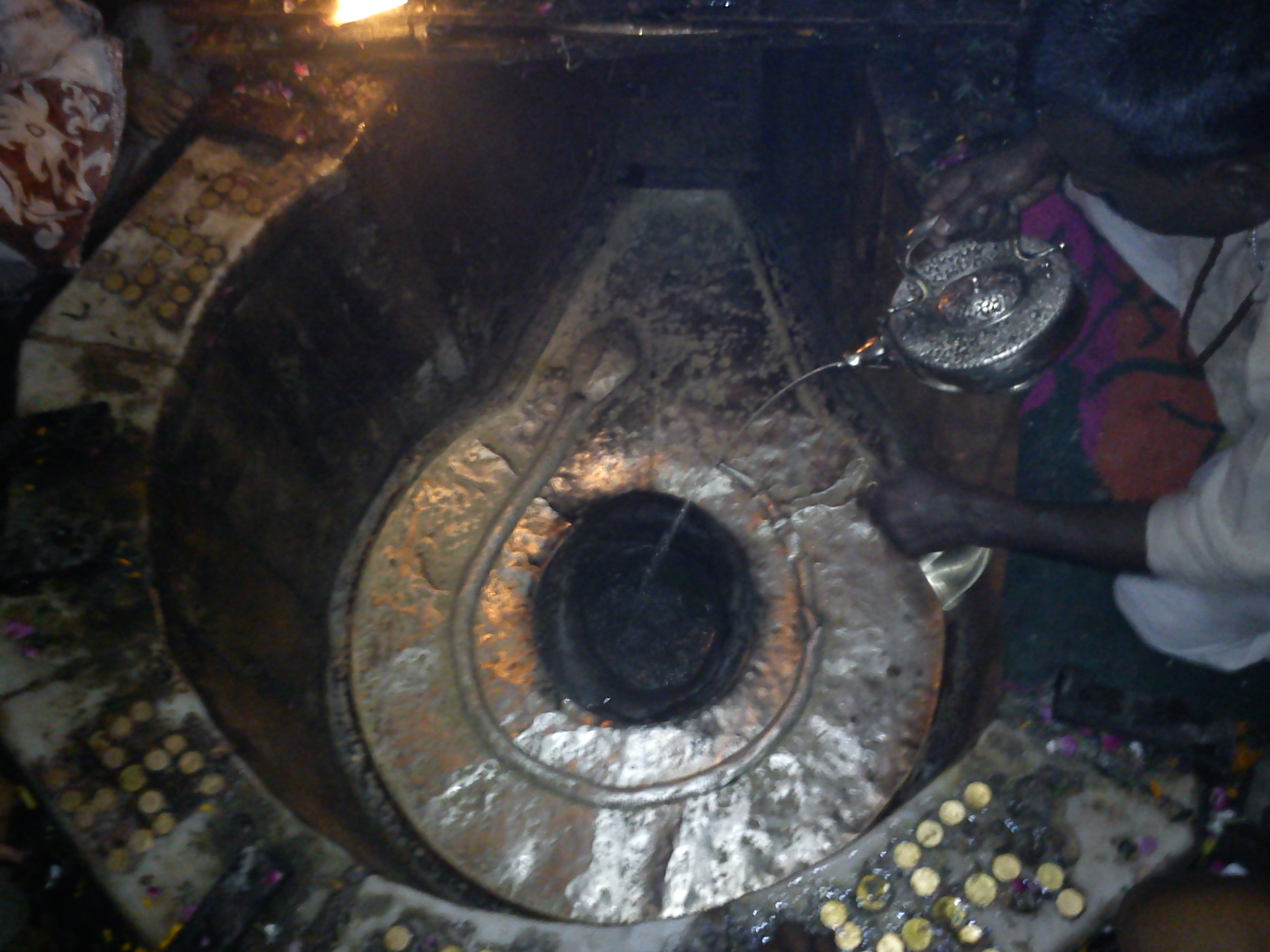
Gola Gokarannath Temple- Shringar Pujan of "Chandrabhal shivling"

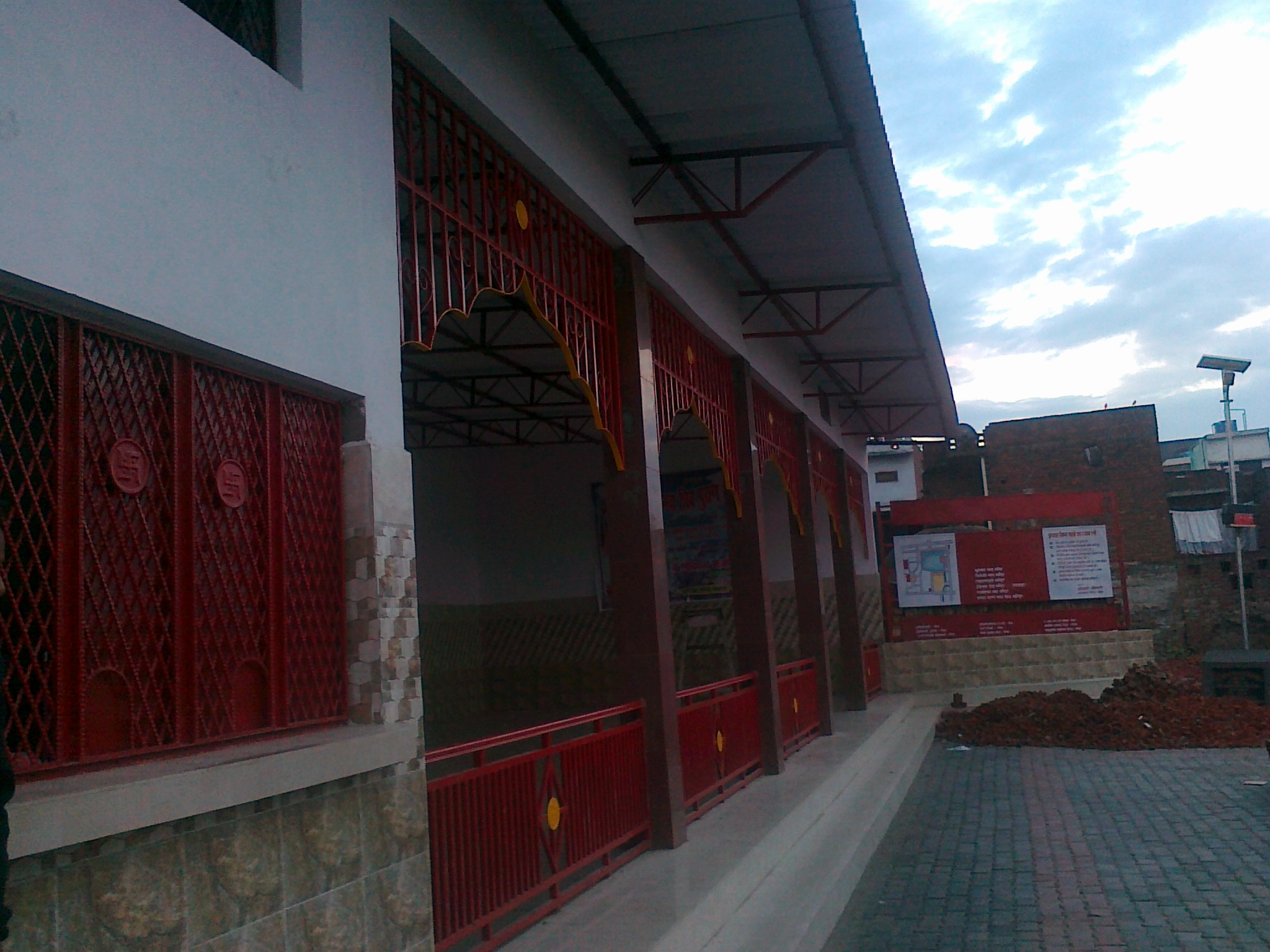
A place to conduct religious ritual.

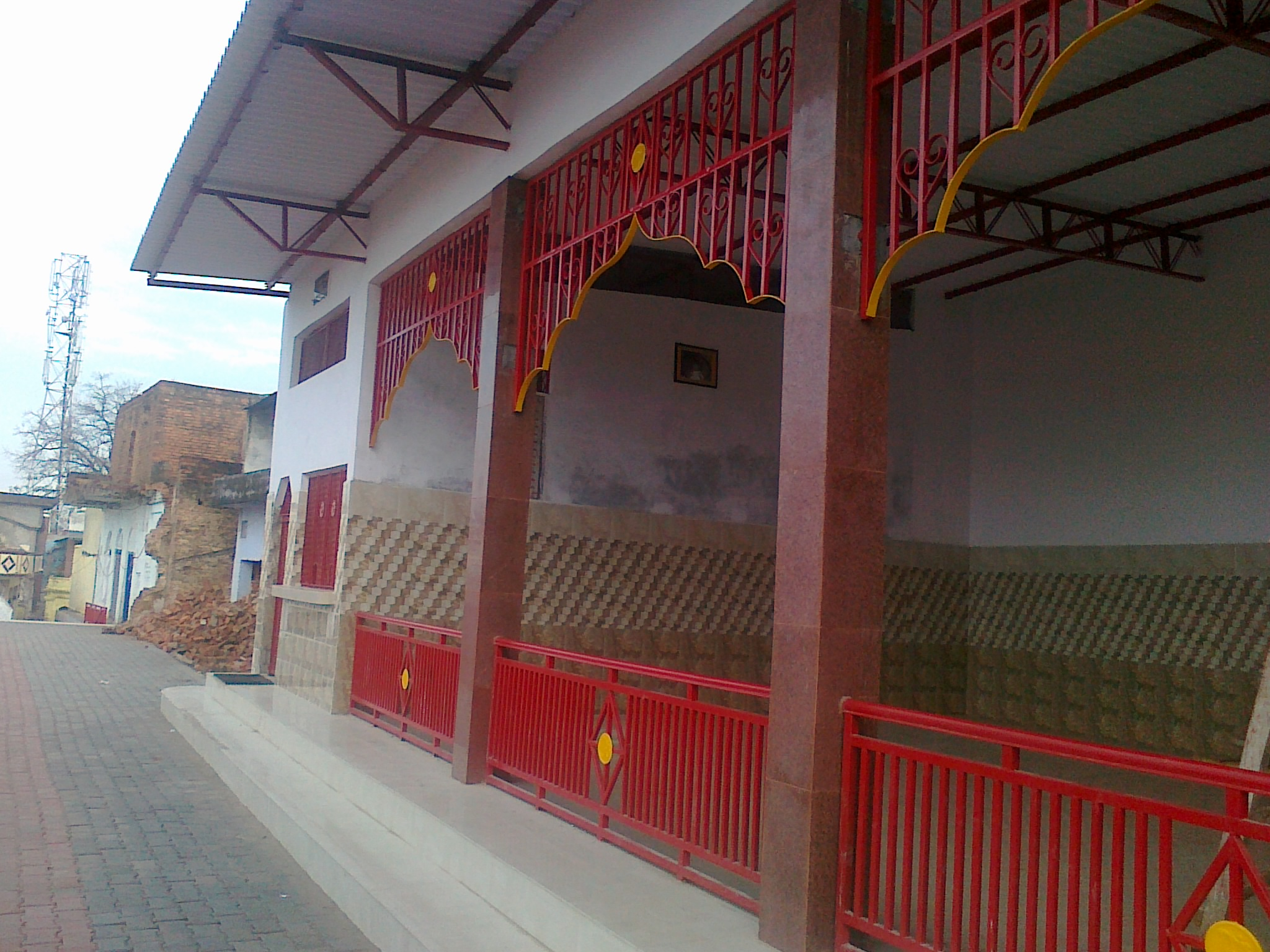
A place to conduct religious ritual.

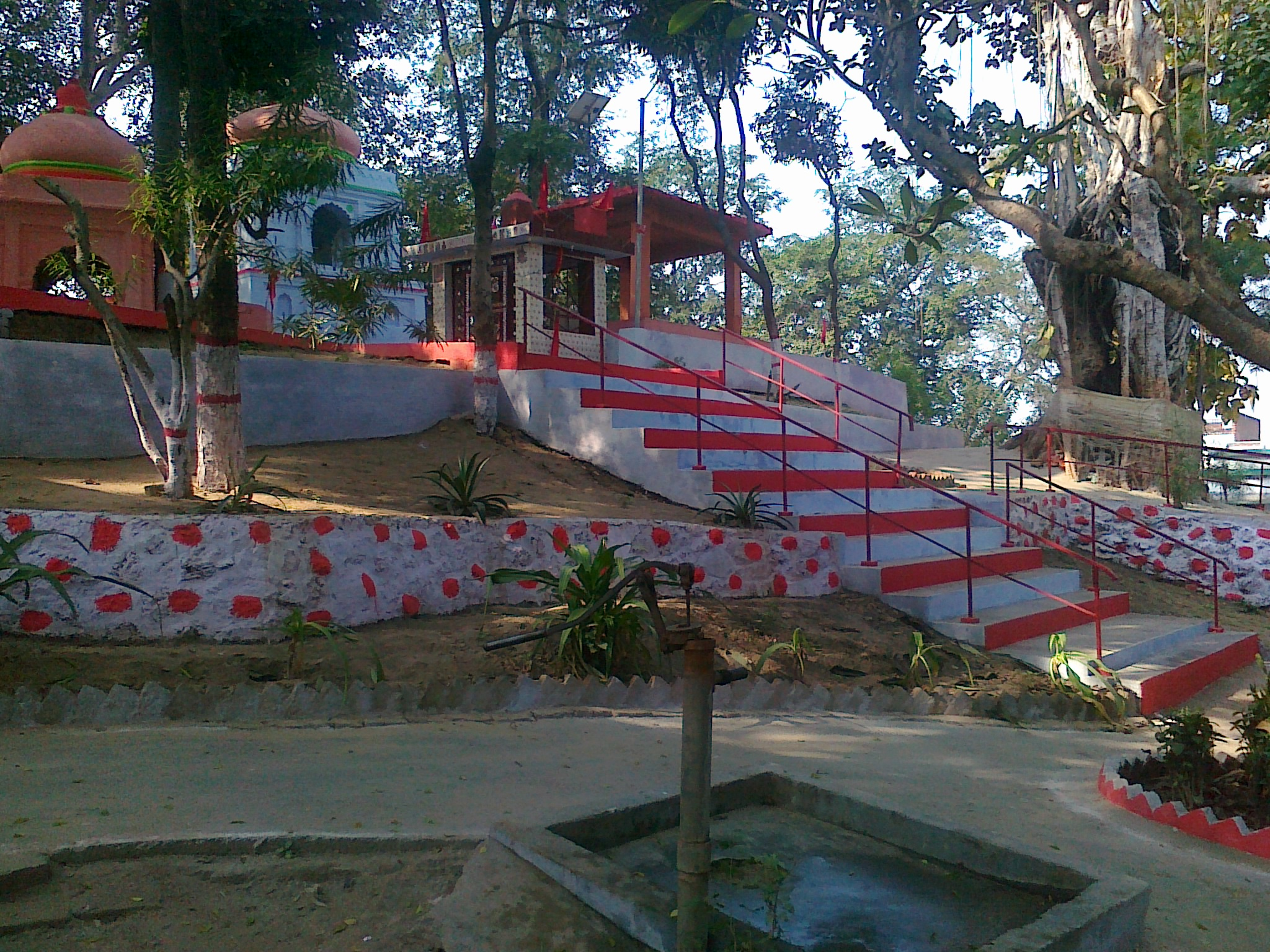
Trilokinath Temple 01-A temple devoted to Mahadev

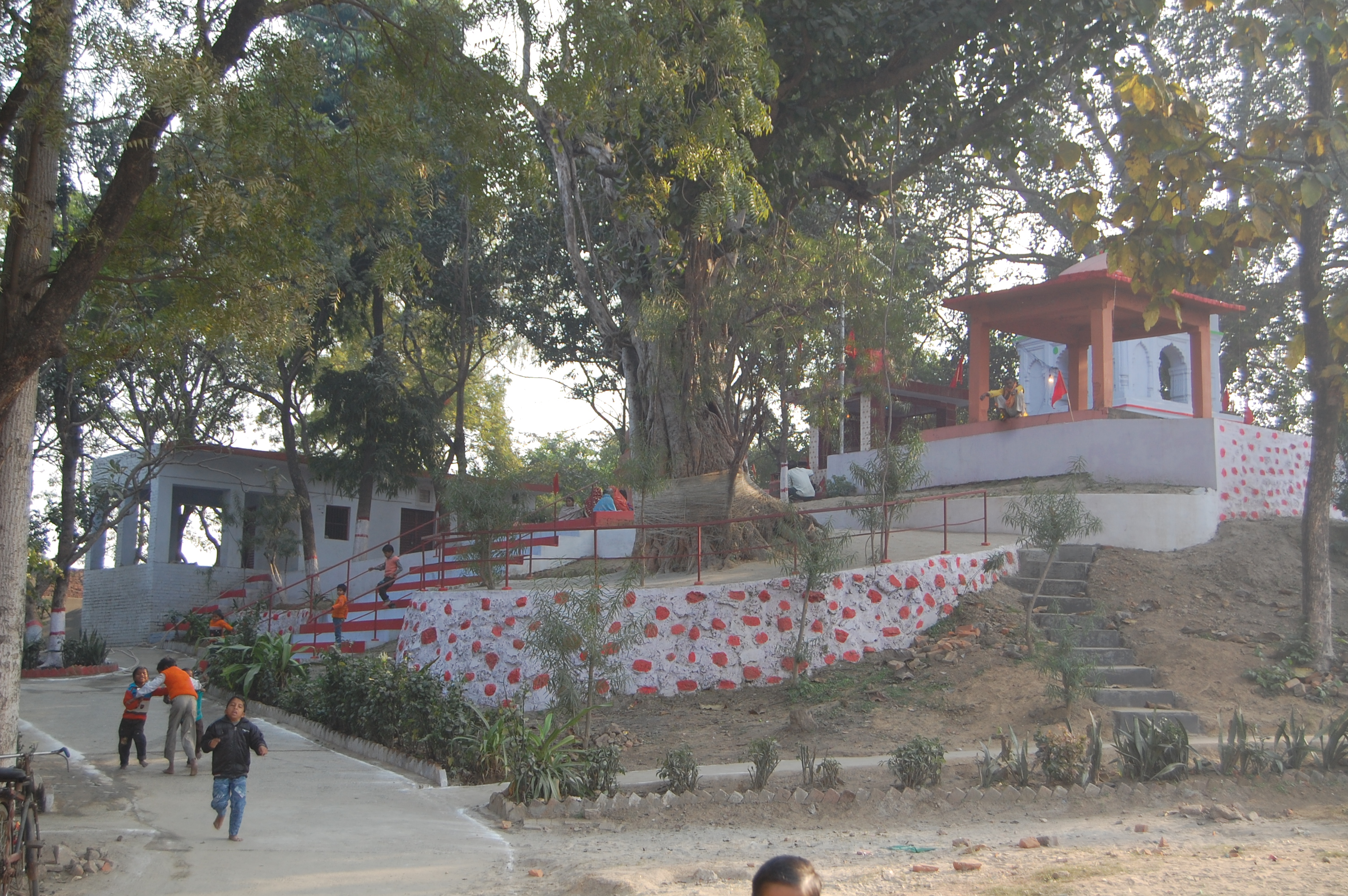
Trilokinath Temple 02-A temple devoted to Mahadev

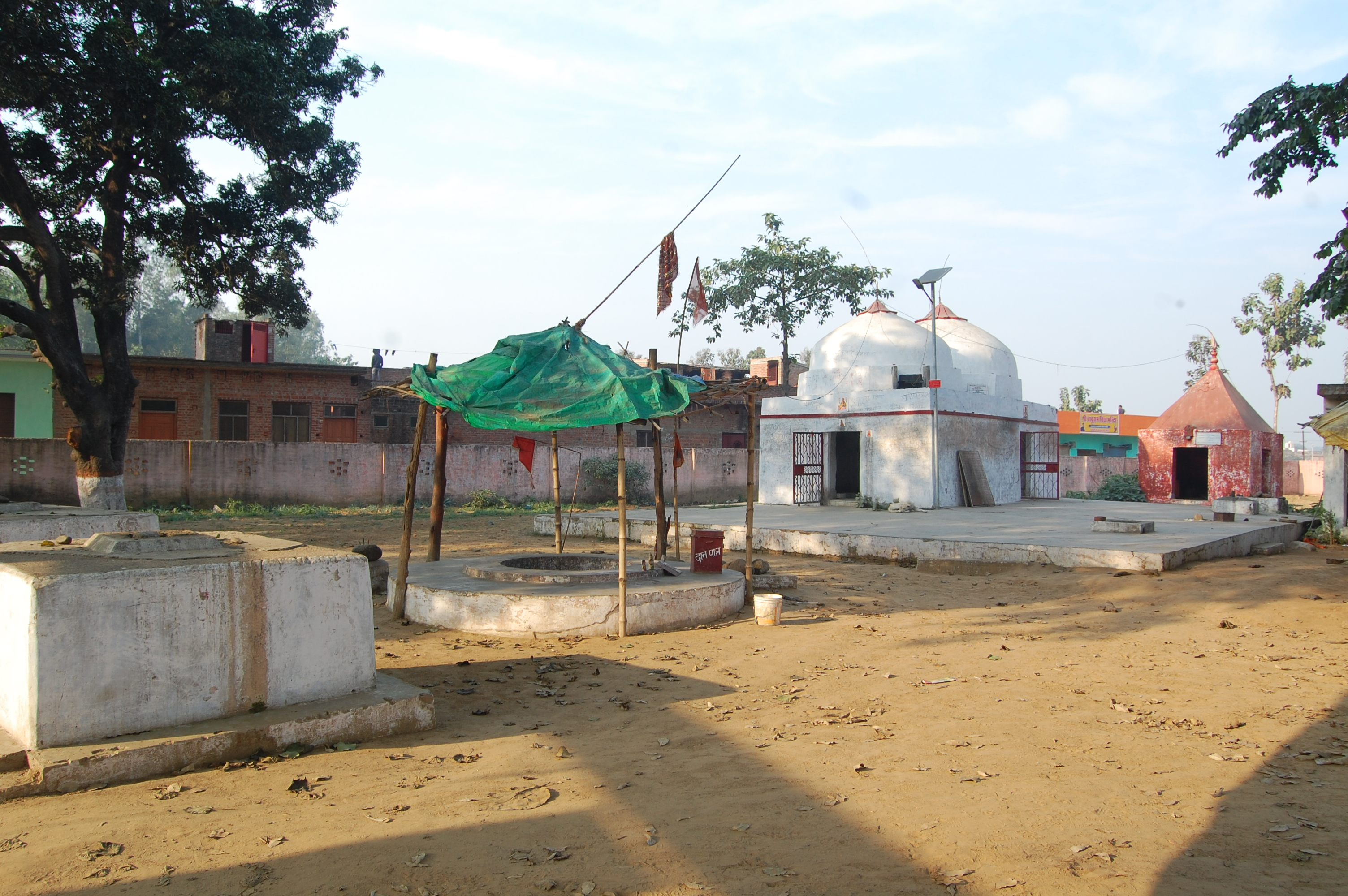
Bhootnath temple 01- religious place with bhootnath well and a very old banyan tree

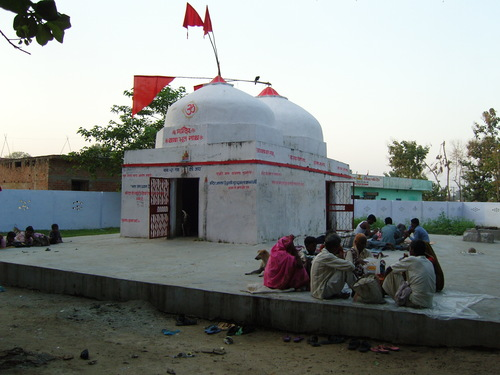
Bhootnath temple 02- religious place with bhootnath well and a very old banyan tree
