= Gheghiya =

Gheghiya Gheghia
- Village
- Location in Bihar, India Gheghiya (India)
- Coordinates: 25.17054°N 83.64091°E
- Country: India
- State: Bihar
- District: Kaimur

Area
  - Total: 2.50 km^{2} (0.97 sq mi)
- Elevation: 81 m (266 ft)

Population (2011)
  - Total: 1,557
  - Density: 623/km^{2} (1,610/sq mi)

Languages
  - Official: Bhojpuri, Hindi
- Time zone: UTC+5:30 (IST)

Gheghiya (also spelled Gheghia) is a village in Mohania block of Kaimur district, Bihar, India. As of 2011, its population was 1,557, in 238 households.
