= Ahinaura =

Coordinates: 25°13′N 83°39′E

Ahinoura
- village
- Interactive map of Ahinoura
- Country: India
- State: Bihar
- District: Kaimur district
- Tehsils: Mohania

Government
  - Body: Village Panchayat

Languages
- Time zone: UTC+5:30 (IST)
- Civic agency: Village Panchayat

Ahinoura is a village in Bihar, India, situated 9km distance from Tehsil (Mohania) and 30km from its district town Bhabua. Its nearby villages are Panapur, Baghini, Turkwaliya and Harnathpur. While its nearest towns are Ramgarh (8km) and Mohania (9km). The village has a high school and a temple of Maa Kali and God Shiva. The community of the Ahinoura depend on agriculture.

== Transportation ==
Nearby Railway station of this village is Bhabua Road railway station.
