= National Highway 419 (India) =

National highway in India

National Highway 419
- Map of the National Highway in red

Route information
- Auxiliary route of NH 19

Major junctions
- East end: Neamatpur (for Route-1), Gobindpur (for Route-2) & Jamtara (for Route-3)
- West end: Madhupur (for Route-1), Suri (for Route-2) & Sahibganj (for Route-3)

Location
- Country: India
- States: Jharkhand, West Bengal

Highway system
- Roads in India; Expressways; National; State; Asian
← NH 19	→ NH 19

National Highway 419, commonly called NH 419 is a national highway in India. It is a spur road of National Highway 19. NH-419 traverses the states of Jharkhand and West Bengal in India. This highway has 3 routes connecting different places in West Bengal & Jharkhand. Route-1 & Route-2 were existing earlier & Route-3 is newly made.

== Route-1 ==
Gobindpur, Halkatta, Saharpur, Narainpur, Jamtara, Nala, Rajnagar, Suri which runs for 157 kilometres (98 mi)

== Route-2 ==
Neamatpur, Salanpur, Dendua, Chittaranjan, Jamtara, Vidyasagar, Karmatanr, Margomunda, Madhupur which runs for 79 kilometres (49 mi)

== Route-3 ==
Newly made from Jamtara, Fatehpura, Dumka, Amarpara, Litipara (Pakur), Sahibganj which runs for 223 kilometres (139 mi)

== Route-1 Junctions ==
NH 19 Terminal near Gobindpur.
NH 14 Terminal near Suri.

== Route-2 Junctions ==
NH 19 Terminal near Neamatpur.
NH 114A Terminal near Madhupur.

== Route-3 Junctions ==
NH 419(Route-1 & Route-2) Terminal near Jamtara.
NH 33 Terminal near Sahibganj.

== See also ==
- List of national highways in India
- List of national highways in India by state
