= Dariyamau =

Dariyamau, also spelt Dariya-Mau, is a village of Vijayipur block in Khaga Tahsil in Fatehpur District of Uttar Pradesh, India. It is a village in Allahabad Division. It is 114 m (374 ft) above sea level.

== Geography ==
Its area is 250.11 hectares (618.0 acres) of which 95.6 hectares (236 acres) is used to pass the canal that is part of the Ramganga Canal channel. 48.29 hectares (119.3 acres) is unirrigated land. 38.30 hectares (94.6 acres) is the area that is not cultivable. It is an agriculturally rich area surrounded by roads. It is situated beside the Dampur-Khaga Road. Nearby villages are Jayrampur Gurgaula, Bhuruhi, Rakshpalpur, Kanpurwa. Hardaspur Sarafan [1 kilometre (0.62 mi)], Gursandi [1 kilometre (0.62 mi)], Andmau [2 kilometres (1.2 mi)], Bhadauha [3 kilometres (1.9 mi)], Chachinda [3 kilometres (1.9 mi)] are the nearby Villages to Dariya Mau. Dariya Mau is surrounded by Vijayipur Tehsil towards North, Sirathu Tehsil towards East, Airayan Tehsil towards North, Sarsawan Tehsil towards south. Khaga, Fatehpur, Lal Gopalganj Nindaura, Chitrakoot, Rae Bareli, Allahabad, Kanpur are the nearby cities to Dariya Mau.

== Population ==
Its total population is 2131, out of which 1124 are male and 1007 are females (census 2011). Of this population 951 are scheduled caste people, making it qualify for Ambedekar village scheme. It is populated with the Hindu and Muslim religion, with no other religion present. Hinduism is the majority religion, including the following castes: Sunar, Kumhar, Tewari, Pandey, Shukla, Trivedi, Mishra, Teli, Gadariya, Nauva, Gupta, Kurmi, Chamar, Pasi, Khatik, Domar, Lohar, Bhat, and Dhobi.

== Facilities ==
It has a Government Primary school and two Anganwadis. There is one Private school of Primary Level. It has Bank Of Baroda (IFSC code: BARB0DARFAT, MICR code: 212012055) as a main bank of the area. It has UP Swasthya Kendra and a Panchayat Bhawan along the Khaga Dampur road. It has very old Jewellary shops. Its roadside area organize Two weekly Market. Local Sweets, cloth Stitching facility, Cement shop, Medical Store, Grinding Shop and several other daily need goods and services are available. Its nearby Intermediate College is Chaudhary Shiv Sahay Singh Inter College Jairampur, Fatehpur. There is a degree college in Jairampur.

== Gram Sabha and Gram Panchayat ==
It has an elected Gram Sabha and a record of successful electoral processes. Its Ex-Pradhan Gram Pradhan was (up to 01/12/2015) Mrs. Rani Tewari whose husband was also Gram Pradhan. Its new village head is Mrs. Nanbitti Nirmal, wife of Mr. Rambishun Nirmal from December 2015.

== How to reach ==
It is connected by road from two sides. One may catch a Bus from Saini, Near the Allahabad and come to Dhata and then to Dariyamau. Other option is to reach from Khaga which is both on Railway route of Delhi-Howrah and National Highway no. 2. From Khaga bus move either from vijayipur Side or from Khairae Side. Distance from the Khaga to Dariyamau is [17 kilometres (11 mi)]. and from Dhata to Dariyamau is [18 kilometres (11 mi)].

Nearby railway station is Khaga.

Postal Details are:

Dariyamau, Post - Khakhredu, Tahsil - Khaga, District - Fatehpur, State - Uttar Pradesh, India- 212656.

Std code: 05182

== Nearby ==
Jairampur is nearby, with a British Period School named Chaudhary Shiv Sahay Singh Inter college established on 8 July 1939. A full-time water canal is a backbone of agriculture. Saidpur Bhuruhi is a forest area with a variety of plants and animals along with a river flowing through. The forest area is decreasing due awareness among locals. Kanpurwa, also nearby, is where a British colonial-era revenue collection was run; the facility, named Kothi, still exists. Local markets are Rakshapal Pur and Khakhredu. Khakhredu has a police station, post office, and health facilities. A community health center is there in Khakhredu and Hardo Near Khaga. Khaga is ancient place that had patriots who fought for the freedom of India. It is the birthplace of Thakur Dariyav Singh, the great freedom fighter. Khaga also has Kotwali (subdivision) and Tahsil. For education up to the intermediate level, good colleges are available but for higher studies people prefer to go to Allahabad and Kanpur.
