= Londonpur =

Village in India

Londonpur (Londonpur Grant) is a gram Panchayat in the Tehsil of Gola Gokaran Nath in the district of Lakhimpur Kheri in the Indian state of Uttar Pradesh. It is part of the Lucknow Division.
