= Kathej =

- Village
- Location in Bihar, India Kathej (India)
- Coordinates: 25.15261°N 83.67963°E
- Country: India
- State: Bihar
- District: Kaimur

Area
  - Total: 4.90 km^{2} (1.89 sq mi)
- Elevation: 86 m (282 ft)

Population (2011)
  - Total: 4,471
  - Density: 912/km^{2} (2,360/sq mi)

Languages
  - Official: Bhojpuri, Hindi
- Time zone: UTC+5:30 (IST)

Kathej is a village in Mohania block of Kaimur district, Bihar, India. As of 2011, its population was 4,471, in 665 households.
