= Ranvendra Pratap Singh =

Indian politician

Minister of state in Food, Civil Supplies & Consumer Affairs Government of Uttar Pradesh
- In office 21 August 2019 – 25 March 2022
- Chief Minister: Yogi Adityanath

Minister of state in Agriculture Government of Uttar Pradesh
- In office 19 March 2017 – 21 August 2019
- Chief Minister: Yogi Adityanath
- Minister: Surya Pratap Shahi

Member of Uttar Pradesh Legislative Assembly
- In office 2017–2022
- Preceded by: Mohammed Asif
- Succeeded by: Usha Maurya
- Constituency: Husainganj
- In office 2007–2012
- Preceded by: Mohammed Shafir
- Succeeded by: Krishna Paswan
- Constituency: Khaga

Personal details
- Born: 2 January 1964 (age 62) Fatehpur, Uttar Pradesh, India
- Party: Bharatiya Janta Party
- Spouse: Pushpa Singh (m. 1978)
- Children: 2 sons, 2 daughters
- Parent: Brijesh Chandra Singh (father)
- Occupation: Agriculturist, Businessman

Ranvendra Pratap Singh (born 3 February 1964) is an Indian politician and a former state minister of Uttar Pradesh.

== Early life ==
Singh was born on 3 February 1964 to Brajesh Chandra Singh in Fatehpur, Uttar Pradesh. He completed his intermediate studies from Yamuna Christian College in 1981. He married Pushpa Singh on 8 May 1978, with whom he has two sons and two daughters. Singh is an agriculturalist and has a dairy farm.

== Political career ==
He was twice elected to the Uttar Pradesh Legislative Assembly as a Bharatiya Janata Party (BJP) member of the Legislative Assembly: for Khaga in 2007 and for Husainganj in 2017. He was named a minister of state for agriculture, agricultural education and research in the Yogi Adityanath ministry.

Singh lost Husainganj constituency seat to Usha Maurya of Samajwadi party in the 2022 Uttar Pradesh Legislative Assembly election.
