= National Highway 319D (India) =

National Highway in India

National Highway 319D

Route information
- Auxiliary route of NH 19
- Length: 48 km (30 mi)

Major junctions
- South end: Allahabad
- North end: Mungra Badshahpur

Location
- Country: India
- States: Uttar Pradesh

Highway system
- Roads in India; Expressways; National; State; Asian
← NH 19	→ NH 31

National Highway 319D, commonly referred to as NH 319D is a national highway in India. It is a secondary route of primary National Highway 19. NH-319D runs in the state of Uttar Pradesh in India.

== Route ==
NH319D connects Prayagraj, Phulpur and Mungra Badshahpur in the state of Uttar Pradesh.

Road Transport Minister Nitin Gadkari laid the foundation stone to four-lane the road from Phulpur to Badshahpur on March 1, 2024. Along with this, the foundation stone was also laid to build two new greenfield bypasses at Phulpur and Mungra Badshahpur.

== Junctions ==
NH 19 Terminal near Prayagraj.
NH 31 Terminal near Mungra Badshahpur.

== See also ==
- List of national highways in India
- List of national highways in India by state
