= Patilwa =

- Village
- Location in Bihar, India Patilwa (India)
- Coordinates: 25.19935°N 83.62735°E
- Country: India
- State: Bihar
- District: Kaimur

Area
  - Total: 1.46 km^{2} (0.56 sq mi)
- Elevation: 81 m (266 ft)

Population (2011)
  - Total: 541
  - Density: 371/km^{2} (960/sq mi)

Languages
  - Official: Bhojpuri, Hindi
- Time zone: UTC+5:30 (IST)

Patilwa is a small village in Mohania block of Kaimur district, Bihar, India. As of 2011, its population was 541, in 68 households.
