= Belaunri =

- Village
- Location in Bihar, India Belaunri (India)
- Coordinates: 25.14647°N 83.64186°E
- Country: India
- State: Bihar
- District: Kaimur

Area
  - Total: 1.22 km^{2} (0.47 sq mi)
- Elevation: 84 m (276 ft)

Population (2011)
  - Total: 5,824
  - Density: 4,770/km^{2} (12,400/sq mi)

Languages
  - Official: Bhojpuri, Hindi
- Time zone: UTC+5:30 (IST)

Belaunri is a village in Mohania block of Kaimur district, Bihar, India. It is located southeast of Mohania, near the Durgavati River. As of 2011, its population was 5,824, in 884 households.
