= Mamade =

Mamadev Māmādev
- Village
- MAMADEV
- Location in Bihar, India Mamadev (India)
- Coordinates: 25.16256°N 83.65324°E
- Country: India
- State: Bihar
- District: Kaimur

Area
  - Total: 2.03 km^{2} (0.78 sq mi)
- Elevation: 81 m (266 ft)

Population (2011)
  - Total: 2,597
  - Density: 1,280/km^{2} (3,310/sq mi)

Languages
  - Official: Bhojpuri, Hindi
- Time zone: UTC+5:30 (IST)

Mamadev is a large village in Mohania block of Kaimur district, Bihar, India. It is located just east of Mohania. As of 2011, its population was 2,597, in 363 households.
