= Husainganj Assembly constituency =

Constituency of the Uttar Pradesh legislative assembly in India

Husainganj
- Constituency No. 242 for the Uttar Pradesh Legislative Assembly

Constituency details
- Country: India
- Region: North India
- State: Uttar Pradesh
- District: Fatehpur
- Total electors: 3,04,518 (2022)
- Reservation: None

Member of Legislative Assembly
- 18th Uttar Pradesh Legislative Assembly
- Incumbent Usha Maurya
- Party: Samajwadi Party
- Elected year: 2022

Husainganj is a constituency of the Uttar Pradesh Legislative Assembly covering the city of Husainganj in the Fatehpur district of Uttar Pradesh, India.

Husainganj is one of six assembly constituencies in the Fatehpur Lok Sabha constituency. Since 2008, this assembly constituency is numbered 242 amongst 403 constituencies.

== Wards/Areas ==
It contains these parts of Fatehpur district:

1. Husainganj of Fatehpur Tehsil;
2. Airayan, Hathagaon & Kotala of Khaga Tehsil

== Members of the Legislative Assembly ==
| Year | Member | Party |
|---|---|---|
| 2012 | Mohammad Asif | Bahujan Samaj Party |
| 2017 | Ranvendra Pratap Singh | Bharatiya Janata Party |
| 2022 | Usha Maurya | Samajwadi Party |

== Election results ==
=== 2027 ===
2027 Uttar Pradesh Legislative Assembly election: Husainganj
| Party | Candidate | Votes | % | ±% |
|---|---|---|---|---|
| INDIA | | | | |
| NDA | | | | |
| BSP | | | | |
| NOTA | None of the above | | | |
| Majority | | | | |
| Turnout | | | | |
| gain from | | Swing | | |

=== 2022 ===
2022 Uttar Pradesh Legislative Assembly election: Husainganj
| Party | Candidate | Votes | % | ±% |
|---|---|---|---|---|
| SP | Usha Maurya | 91,884 | 48.78 | |
| BJP | Ranvendra Pratap Singh | 66,703 | 35.41 | −6.49 |
| BSP | Fareed Ahmad | 21,009 | 11.15 | −8.44 |
| INC | Shivakant Tiwari | 5,042 | 2.68 | −28.63 |
| NOTA | None of the above | 1,765 | 0.94 | −0.42 |
| Majority | | 25,181 | 13.37 | +2.78 |
| Turnout | | 188,359 | 61.85 | +0.6 |
| SP gain from BJP | | Swing | | |

=== 2017 ===
2017 Uttar Pradesh Legislative Assembly election: Husainganj
| Party | Candidate | Votes | % | ±% |
|---|---|---|---|---|
| BJP | Ranvendra Pratap Singh | 73,595 | 41.9 | |
| INC | Usha Maurya | 55,002 | 31.31 | |
| BSP | Mohd Asif | 34,415 | 19.59 | |
| CPI | Rakesh Prajapati | 3,416 | 1.94 | |
| RLD | Pappu Singh | 2,291 | 1.3 | |
| NOTA | None of the above | 2,361 | 1.36 | |
| Majority | | 18,593 | 10.59 | |
| Turnout | | 175,664 | 61.25 | |
| BJP gain from BSP | | Swing | | |
