= Kishunpur =

- Town
- Location in Uttar Pradesh, India
- Coordinates: 25°38′N 81°01′E
- Country: India
- State: Uttar Pradesh
- District: Fatehpur

Population (2011)
  - Total: 7,000

Languages
  - Official: Hindi
- Time zone: UTC+5:30 (IST)
- Vehicle registration: UP 71 xxxx

Religions in Kishunpur Town
Religion	Percent
Hinduism	87.61%
Muslim	12.31%
Others†	0.07%

Kishunpur is a town and a nagar panchayat in Fatehpur district and in Khaga Sub-district in the Indian state of Uttar Pradesh.

== Demographics ==
As of 2011 India census, Kishunpur had a population of 7,000 out of which 3,671 are males and 3,329 are females thus the Average Sex Ratio of Kishunpur is 907. Kishunpur has an average literacy rate of 65.60% thus Kishunpur has lower literacy rate compared to 67.4% of Fatehpur district. The male literacy rate is 75.19% and the female literacy rate is 54.9% in Kishunpur.

== See also ==
- Kishunpur, a village in Jaunpur, India
