= Budwan =

- Village
- Location in Uttar Pradesh Budwan (India)
- Coordinates: 25°46′39″N 81°10′05″E
- Country: India
- State: Uttar Pradesh
- District: Fatehpur
- Elevation: 114 m (374 ft)

Population (2011)
  - Total: 10,000(Approx)

Languages
  - Official: Hindi
- Time zone: UTC+5:30 (IST)
- PIN: 212655
- Website: http://fatehpur.nic.in/

Budwan is a village of Khaga Tehsil in Fatehpur District of Uttar Pradesh State, India. It belongs to Allahabad Division. It is located 42 km east from district headquarters Fatehpur. The pin code of Budwan is 212655 and the postal head office is Khaga Town. The official languages of this village are Hindi and English.

Schools

- Inter college Budwan
- Government Junior High school
- Government Primary School I
- Government Primary School II
- Jeevan Jyoti Vidya Mandir
