= Bhundi Tekari =

Bhundi Tekari Bhundi Tekāri
- Village
- Location in Bihar, India Bhundi Tekari (India)
- Coordinates: 25.18986°N 83.64477°E
- Country: India
- State: Bihar
- District: Kaimur

Area
  - Total: 1.33 km^{2} (0.51 sq mi)
- Elevation: 81 m (266 ft)

Population (2011)
  - Total: 1,140
  - Density: 857/km^{2} (2,220/sq mi)

Languages
  - Official: Bhojpuri, Hindi
- Time zone: UTC+5:30 (IST)

Bhundi Tekari is a village in Mohania block of Kaimur district, Bihar, India. As of 2011, its population was 1,140, in 144 households.
