= Khaga =

- Tehsil & Town
- Location in Uttar Pradesh, India
- Coordinates: 25.78°N 81.12°E
- Country: India
- State: Uttar Pradesh
- District: Fatehpur
- Assembly Constituency: Khaga

Government
  - Type: Municipality
  - Body: Nagar Panchayat (NP) Khaga
  - Chairman: Gita Singh (Bharatiya Janta Party)
  - MLA: Krishna Paswan (Bhartiya Janta Party)
  - SDM: Rahul Kashyap
- Elevation: 107 m (351 ft)

Population (2011)
  - Tehsil & Town: 786,635
  - Urban: 54,484
  - Rural: 732,151

Languages
  - Official: Hindi English
- Time zone: UTC+5:30 (IST)
- Postal code: 212655
- Vehicle registration: UP 71 xxxx

Religions in Khaga Town
Religion	Percent
Hinduism	83.36%
Muslim	16.26%
Sikhism	0.01%
Christians	0.31%
Others†	0.07%

Khaga is a Town and a Sub-district in Fatehpur district in the Indian state of Uttar Pradesh. It is situated on NH 19 between the cities of Prayagraj, which is also known as Allahabad, and Kanpur and is also connected to those places by rail, by which Allahabad is 86 kilometres (53 mi) distant and Kanpur 102 kilometres (63 mi). The north boundary of the district is limited by the river Ganges and its southern boundary is the river Yamuna.

== Geography ==
Khaga has an average elevation of 107 metres (351 feet). Khaga town is lying in between two big holy rivers of India Ganga and Yamuna. Kishunpur is situated in south on the bank of Yamuna river, while Naubasta Ghat is is located in the north on the bank of Ganga river in Khaga.

== Demographics ==
As of the 2011 India census, Khaga Tehsil had a population of 7,86,635 out of which 4,11,715 are males while 3,74,920 are females. The average literacy rate was 63.04% out of which male literacy was 74.11% and female literacy was 50.85%. The sex ratio was 911.

Khaga Tehsil had urban population of 54,484 in which Khaga Town had population of 35,637 with 75.8% literacy rate, Hathgam Town had population of 11,847 with 75.85% literacy rate & Kishunpur Town had population of 7,000 with 65.62% literacy rate.

Khaga Tehsil consists of 563 villages which combines a total rural population of 7,32,151 with 62.16% literacy rate.

Religions in Khaga Tehsil
Religion	Percent
Hinduism	84.90%
Muslim	14.76%
Sikhism	0.01%
Christians	0.07%
Others†	0.25%

=== Villages ===
- Budwan
- Dariyamau

== Politics ==
The city is part of the Khaga (Assembly constituency).

== Railways ==
Khaga comes under NCR Zone and is connected with important cities such as Allahabad, Varanasi and Kanpur.
