= Munna Lal Maurya =

Former Minister of State in Government of Uttar Pradesh

Member of the Uttar Pradesh Legislative Assembly
- In office 1996–2002
- Constituency: Khaga Assembly constituency

Personal details
- Born: September 15, 1965 Sultanpur Ghosh, Fatehpur district
- Died: April 26, 2007 (aged 41)
- Party: Bahujan Samaj Party
- Other political affiliations: Bhartiya Janta Party Indian National Congress
- Spouse: Usha Maurya
- Parent: Nanku Lal Maurya (father)

Munna Lal Maurya (15 September 1965 – 26 April 2007) was an Indian politician based in Uttar Pradesh. He was elected to 13th Uttar Pradesh Legislative Assembly in 1996 Uttar Pradesh Legislative Assembly elections. Maurya was elected as a member of Bahujan Samaj Party. He also served as a minister in Government of Uttar Pradesh when Bhartiya Janta Party was in power in state under Kalyan Singh and Rajnath Singh's leadership. His wife Usha Maurya was elected to Uttar Pradesh Legislative Assembly from Husainganj constituency as a candidate of Samajwadi Party in 2022 Uttar Pradesh Legislative Assembly elections. He represented Khaga Assembly constituency in Uttar Pradesh Legislative Assembly.

== Life and career ==
Munna Lal Maurya was born on 15 September 1965 in Fatehpur district of Uttar Pradesh in a farmer family.After completing his bachelor's degree he came into active politics and participated in various social movements influenced by Kanshiram.Maurya was an agriculturist before he became an active member of Bahujan Samaj Party.His first stint as member of Uttar Pradesh Legislative Assembly came in 1996 UP Assembly elections, when he was elected from Khaga Assembly constituency of the Fatehpur district on the symbol of Bahujan Samaj Party. Between 1997 and 1998, he served as member of Parliamentary Research, Reference and Studies committee of Uttar Pradesh Legislative Assembly and later Minister of State in BJP Govt. He defeated Bhup Narayan Singh Lodhi of Bharatiya Janata Party in 1996 assembly elections.

He was subsequently defeated in 2002 Assembly Election after losing the election to BSP candidate by 3074 votes.In 2002, he contested as a member of Bharatiya Janata Party.

He died in a road accident on April 26, 2007 during UP Assembly Election.
