= Krishna Paswan =

Indian politician

Member of Legislative Assembly, Uttar Pradesh
- Incumbent
- Assumed office 6 March 2012
- Preceded by: Ranvendra Pratap Singh
- Constituency: Khaga

Member of Legislative Assembly, Uttar Pradesh
- In office 24 February 2002 – 6 March 2007
- Preceded by: Murlidhar
- Succeeded by: Murlidhar
- Constituency: Kishunpur, Uttar Pradesh

Personal details
- Party: Bharatiya Janata Party

Krishna Paswan is an Indian politician and member of the Bharatiya Janata Party. Paswan is a member of the Uttar Pradesh Legislative Assembly from the Khaga constituency in Fatehpur district.
