= Krishnapuram, Thanjavur district =

Krishnapuram
- village
- Country: India
- State: Tamil Nadu
- District: Thanjavur
- Taluk: Orathanadu

Population (2001)
  - Total: 895

Languages
  - Official: Tamil
- Time zone: UTC+5:30 (IST)

Krishnapuram is a village in the Orathanadu taluk of Thanjavur district, Tamil Nadu, India.

== Demographics ==
As per the 2001 census, Krishnapuram had a total population of 895 with 459 males and 436 females. The sex ratio was 950. The literacy rate was 59.51.
