= Uttar Krishnapur Part-I =

- city
- Location in Assam, India Uttar Krishnapur Part-I (India)
- Coordinates: 24°46′56″N 92°47′59″E
- Country: India
- State: Assam
- District: Cachar

Population (2001)
  - Total: 5,129

Languages
  - Official: Bengali and Meitei (Manipuri)
- Time zone: UTC+5:30 (IST)
- Vehicle registration: AS

Uttar Krishnapur Part-I is a census town in Cachar district in the Indian state of Assam.

== Demographics ==
As of 2001 India census, Uttar Krishnapur Part-I had a population of 5129. Males constitute 52% of the population and females 48%. Uttar Krishnapur Part-I has an average literacy rate of 64%, higher than the national average of 59.5%: male literacy is 69%, and female literacy is 59%. In Uttar Krishnapur Part-I, 14% of the population is under 6 years of age.

Bengali and Meitei (Manipuri) are the official languages of this place.
