= National Highway 119 (India) =

National highway in India

National Highway 119
- Map of National Highway 119 in red
- Schematic map of National Highways in India

Route information
- Auxiliary route of NH 19
- Length: 93 km (58 mi)

Major junctions
- East end: Dehri
- West end: Border- UP/Bihar,

Location
- Country: India
- States: Bihar

Highway system
- Roads in India; Expressways; National; State; Asian
← NH 19	→ NH 119

National Highway 119 (NH 119) is a National Highway in India. It runs entirely in the state of Bihar. It is a spur road of National Highway 19. NH-119 was previously numbered NH-2C. This highway mostly runs along Son river.

== Route ==
NH-19 Dehri, Akbarpur(Nagar Panchayat Rohtas), Yadunathpur – Bihar/UP Border(Jaradag).

== Junctions ==
NH 19 Terminal near Dehri

== See also ==
- List of national highways in India
- List of national highways in India by state
