= Kauriram =

Kauriram Kaurīrām
- Village
- Location in Bihar, India Kauriram (India)
- Coordinates: 25.14699°N 83.64993°E
- Country: India
- State: Bihar
- District: Kaimur

Area
  - Total: 2.04 km^{2} (0.79 sq mi)
- Elevation: 83 m (272 ft)

Population (2011)
  - Total: 2,269
  - Density: 1,110/km^{2} (2,880/sq mi)

Languages
  - Official: Bhojpuri, Hindi
- Time zone: UTC+5:30 (IST)

Kauriram is a village in Mohania block of Kaimur district, Bihar, India. It is located southeast of Mohania, on the Grand Trunk Road. As of 2011, its population was 2,269, in 331 households.
