= National Highway 519 (India) =

National highway in India

National Highway 519
- Map of National Highway 519 in red

Route information
- Auxiliary route of NH 19
- Length: 28 km (17 mi)

Major junctions
- From: Sikandara
- To: Bhognipur

Location
- Country: India
- States: Uttar Pradesh

Highway system
- Roads in India; Expressways; National; State; Asian
← NH 19	→ NH 27

National Highway 519 (NH 519) is a National Highway in India. It connects Sikandara and Bhognipur in Uttar Pradesh.
