= Krishnapur, Jaunpur =

Krishnapur
- Village
- Location within Uttar Pradesh Location within India
- Coordinates: 25.9607°N 82.5215°E
- Country: India
- State: Uttar Pradesh
- District: Jaunpur
- Subdistrict: Badlapur
- Time zone: UTC+05:30 (IST)
- 223107: 223107

Krishnapur is a village on the bank of the Gomti River in the Badlapur tehsil of the Jaunpur district of Uttar Pradesh, India.

The primary entry point of Krishnapur village is at latitude 25.96, longitude 82.52.
