= Gola Gokarannath =

- City
- Location in Uttar Pradesh, India
- Coordinates: 28.08°N 80.47°E
- Country: India
- State: Uttar Pradesh
- District: Lakhimpur Kheri

Government
  - Type: District Magistrate of Kheri (Government of Uttar Pradesh)
  - Body: Nagar Palika Parishad, Gola Gokarannath • Vijay Shukla 'Rinku', Chairman Member of Legislative Assembly • Aman Giri, MLA, 139 Gola Gokarannath

Area
  - Total: 6 km^{2} (2.3 sq mi)
- Elevation: 147 m (482 ft)

Population (2011)
  - Total: 150,000−200,000+

Languages
  - Official: Hindi
- Time zone: UTC+5:30 (IST)
- PIN: 262802
- Telephone code: 05876
- Vehicle registration: UP-31
- Website: golatourism.in

Gola Gokarannath or Gola is a city, municipal board, thana, and tehsil located in the Lakhimpur Kheri district of the Indian state of Uttar Pradesh. It is renowned as a Hindu pilgrimage destination, most notably for the Gokarannath Temple, dedicated to Lord Shiva. References to the significance of this pilgrimage are found in various Hindu scriptures, and large numbers of devotees visit the site during Sawan and Mahashivratri festivals to seek blessings and perform darshan of Lord Shiva.

In addition to its spiritual importance, Gola Gokarannath is also known for the BHL sugar mill. It is popularly referred to as Chhoti Kashi (Little Kashi) due to its religious prominence.

== Demographics ==
As of 2011 India census, Gola Gokaran Nath has a population of 60,172, of which 31,415 are males while 28,757 are females. The population of Children with age 0-6 is 6740 which is 11.20% of the total population of Gola Gokaran Nath (NPP). In Gola Gokaran Nath Nagar Palika Parishad, the female sex ratio is 915 against the state average of 912. Moreover, the child sex ratio in Gola Gokaran Nath is around 891 compared to the Uttar Pradesh state average of 902. The literacy rate of Gola Gokaran Nath city is 81.85% higher than the state average of 67.68%. In Gola Gokaran Nath, male literacy is around 86.24% while the female literacy rate is 77.07%.

Religion in Gola Gokaran Nath (2011 Census)
Hinduism	75.269%
Islam	23.052%
Christianity	0.291%
Sikhism	1.172%
Buddhism	0.023%
Jainism	0.035%
Other	0.003%
Not stated	0.155%

== History ==
It is believed that the current town of Gola Gokaran Nath originated as two separate settlements: one called Gokaran Nath, centered around the Shiva temple, and the other known as Gollihara. A famine in Gollihara prompted the general population to migrate closer to the temple. Over time, the name of Gollihara evolved to Golli, then to Goala, and eventually to Gola. The merger of these two towns (or villages) resulted in the formation of the town now known as Gola Gokaran Nath.

Another historical perspective suggests that, toward the late 1700s or early 1800s, individuals designated as criminals by the British settled in and around the temple, disguising themselves as sadhus to evade capture. This caused increased tension with the British authorities, who exerted pressure on the Mohammadi Riyaasat, as the area was under its jurisdiction. As a result, the ruler of Mohammadi ceased regular revenue collection from the town and eventually abandoned it. Later, the town was incorporated into the Kheri district under British administration.

== Dharmik (Religious) significance ==
During the great war of the Ramayana in the Treta Yuga, Ravana pleased Lord Shiva through intense penance to gain the power to defeat Lord Rama. In response, Lord Shiva manifested as a Shiv-ling, instructing Ravana to install it in Lanka. However, Lord Shiva set a condition: the Shiv-ling must not touch the earth during the journey to Lanka.

On his way back, Ravana entrusted the Shiv-ling to a shepherd while he stepped away to attend to nature's call. To prevent the Shiv-ling from being carried to Lanka, Lord Shiva is believed to have increased its weight, forcing the shepherd to place it on the ground. Upon finding the Shiv-ling on the earth, Ravana became furious, understanding Lord Shiva's intention to stop him from taking the Shiv-ling to Lanka, which would have granted Ravana victory in the war. In his anger, Ravana pressed the Shiv-ling with his thumb, leaving an impression resembling a cow's ear (गौ-कर्ण). The town of Gola Gokaran Nath is said to derive its name from this legend.

== Geography ==
Gola Gokaran Nath is situated at 28.08° N 80.47° E. Gola Gokran Nath is a small city located at the banks of Sarayan river. It is surrounded by dense tropical forests. It is the second biggest town of Lakhimpur Kheri district.

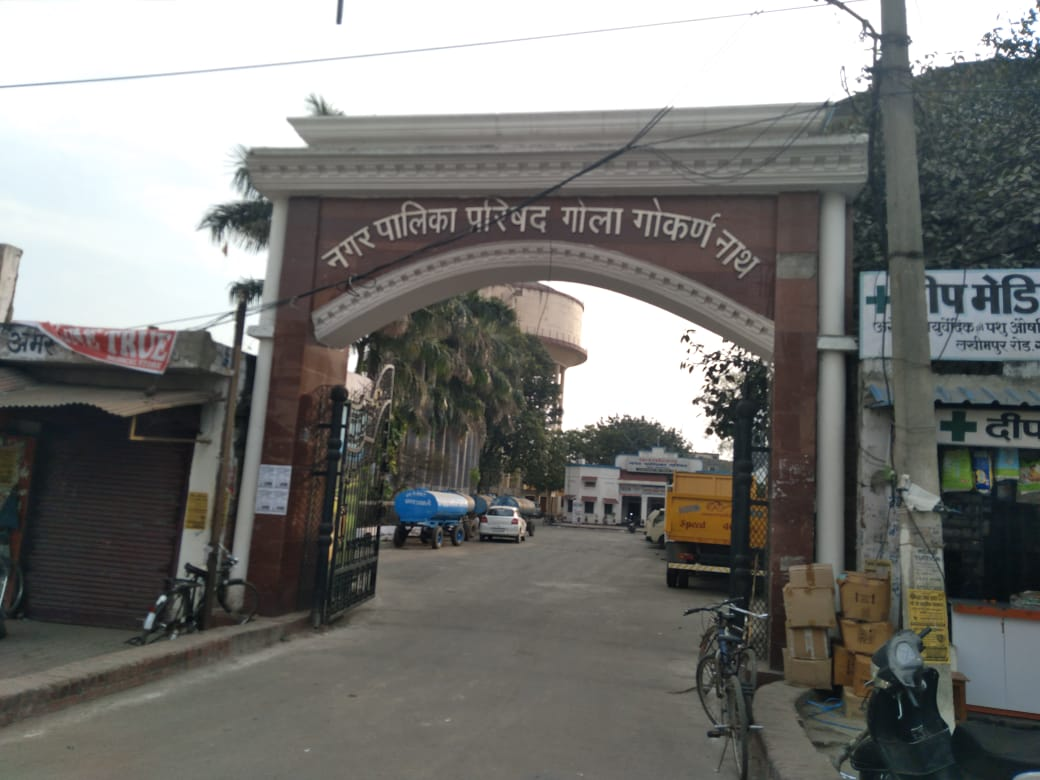

== Politics ==
It is part of the 139 Gola Gokrannath Assembly constituency and Kheri Lok Sabha constituency. It comes under the municipal jurisdiction of Nagar Palika Parishad Gola Gokarannath.

== Industry ==
Gola is home to one of the most prominent sugar mills in Asia. Bajaj Hindusthan sugar Limited is situated in the northern part.

The site selected for the first plant was at Gola Gokaran Nath in the district Lakhimpur Kheri in the Terai region of Uttar Pradesh (UP), an area rich in sugar cane. The original capacity of the factory was 400 tons of cane crushed per day (TCD). Subsequently, this capacity was increased in stages and is currently 13,000 TCD. The distillery unit at this plant commenced production during the end of World War II in 1944. In the initial few years, the major output was in the form of power alcohol as an additive to petrol, which was then in short supply. The unit was the first to supply alcohol-mixed petrol to the army.

Another sugar plant with a cane crushing capacity of 1,400 TCD was set up in 1972 at Palia Kalan, a giant sugarcane supplying center at a distance of about 70 kilometres (43 mi) from Gola Gokaran Nath.

== Landmarks ==
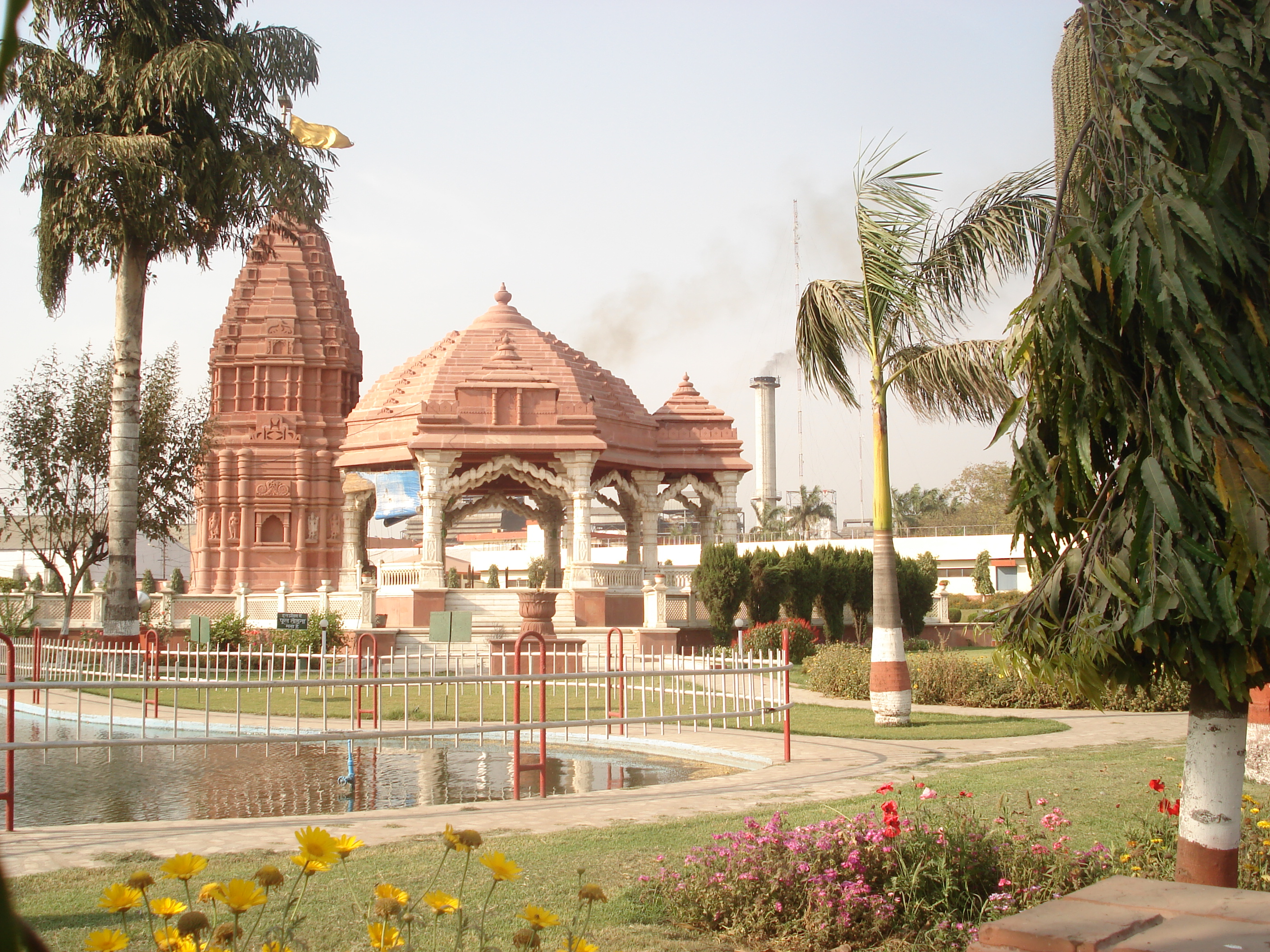
Laxmi Narayan Mandir BHL, Gola

Gola is famous for its Shiva Temple. Many people come here from distant places to visit the temple and get a sight of the holy place. It is difficult to find space in the temple during the Hindu holy month of Shravan. Other areas of religious significance are Lakshmi-Narayan temple and Bhoot Nath temple near Degree College. There are many colleges and schools. There are many markets like Tirth colony, Tiwari Market at Mill Road, Punjabi market. Tirth Bazaar is primarily a ladies' shopping domain consisting of shops for bangles, makeup/cosmetics items, holy books, etc.

== Transport ==
=== Rail ===
Gola Gokarannath is located on the broad-gauge railway line under the Lucknow Division of the North Eastern Railway. This line connects the city directly to major destinations such as Gorakhpur, Gonda, Lucknow, Sitapur, Lakhimpur, Pilibhit, Bareilly, and Kasganj. The Lucknow–Sitapur–Lakhimpur–Pilibhit–Bareilly–Kasganj line was converted from meter gauge to broad gauge in February 2020.

The city is served by direct trains to important locations, including Lucknow, Barabanki, Gonda, Howrah, Sitapur, Lakhimpur, Varanasi, Ramnagar, and Gorakhpur.

=== Road ===
Gola Gokarannath is situated on National Highway 730 and is well-connected through state and national highways. The city can be directly accessed from major destinations including Lucknow (170 km (110 mi)), Bareilly (165 km (103 mi)), Pilibhit (100 km (62 mi)), and Shahjahanpur (65 km (40 mi)).

Regular transportation services, including ordinary buses and AC Shatabdi buses, operate to and from cities such as Delhi, Lucknow, Lakhimpur, Pilibhit, Shahjahanpur, and Bareilly. These services run round the clock, ensuring convenient travel to and from Gola Gokarannath.

=== Air ===
The nearest airport to Gola Gokarannath is Bareilly Airport, located approximately 120 km (75 mi) away. A better-connected option is the Chaudhary Charan Singh International Airport (Amausi Airport) in Lucknow, situated at a distance of around 180 km (110 mi). This airport offers direct flights to major cities across India, including Mumbai, Delhi, Bangalore, Jaipur, and Pune.

== See also ==
- Londonpur
- Baida Kheda
