= National Highway 219 (India) =

National highway in India

National Highway 219
- Map of National Highway 219 in red

Route information
- Auxiliary route of NH 19
- Length: 60 km (37 mi)

Major junctions
- East end: Mohania
- West end: Chandauli

Location
- Country: India
- States: Bihar, Uttar Pradesh

Highway system
- Roads in India; Expressways; National; State; Asian
← NH 19	→ NH 19

National Highway 219, commonly referred as NH 219 is a National Highway in India. It is a spur road of National Highway 19. NH-219 traverses the states of Bihar and Uttar Pradesh in India.

== Route ==
- Mohania
- Bhabua (Junctions: JP Circle and KP Circle)
- Chainpur
- Chand
- Chandauli

== Junctions ==
NH 19 Terminal near Mohania.
NH 19 Terminal near Chandauli.

NH 219 Junction with NH 219A

at JP Circle BHABUA .

NH 219 Junction with NH 219B

at KP Circle BHABUA .

NH 219

NH 219A

NH 219A is a spur Road of NH 219. It connects Adhaura with Bhabhua. Its a 55KM Long Highway in Bihar. It Originates from JP Circle BHABUA And Terminates at Adhaura.

NH 219

NH 219B

NH 219B is a spur Road of NH 219. It connects Kudra with Bhabhua. Its a 20KM Long Highway in Bihar. It Originates from KP Circle BHABUA And Terminates at NH 19 in Kudra.

== See also ==
- List of national highways in India
- List of national highways in India by state
