= Gola Bazar, Uttar Pradesh =

Gola Bazar Maa sarayu dham
- town
- Nickname: Gola
- Location in Uttar Pradesh, India Gola Bazar (India)
- Coordinates: 26°20′50″N 83°21′15″E
- Country: India
- State: Uttar Pradesh
- District: Gorakhpur

Government
  - Type: Nagar Panchayat Gola
  - MLA: altitude =

Population (2011)
  - Total: 10,339

Languages
  - Official: Bhojpuri Hindi
- Time zone: UTC+5:30 (IST)
- 273408: 273408
- Vehicle registration: UP53
- Website: up.gov.in

Gola Bazar is a town and a nagar panchayat in Gorakhpur district in the Indian state of Uttar Pradesh. It is also known for its gold market. It is located near the Saryu (Ghaghra) river. This river itself is a border between Gorakhpur and Azamgarh. Distance from Gorakhpur City is around 54 km via kauriram. It is one of the tehsils of Gorakhpur. It is very famous for its ghats which are on the bank of river Saryu. Gola market is very famous among the villages and other towns around it.

== Demographics ==
As of the 2001 Census of India, Gola Bazar had a population of 10,613. Males constitute 52% of the population and females 48%. Gola Bazar has an average literacy rate of 80%, lower than the national average of 59.5%: male literacy is 61%, and female literacy is 46%. In Gola Bazar, 16% of the population is under 6 years of age Gola Nearly Rajesultanpur In 68 km.
