= Ramgarh, Bihar =

Village in Bihar, India

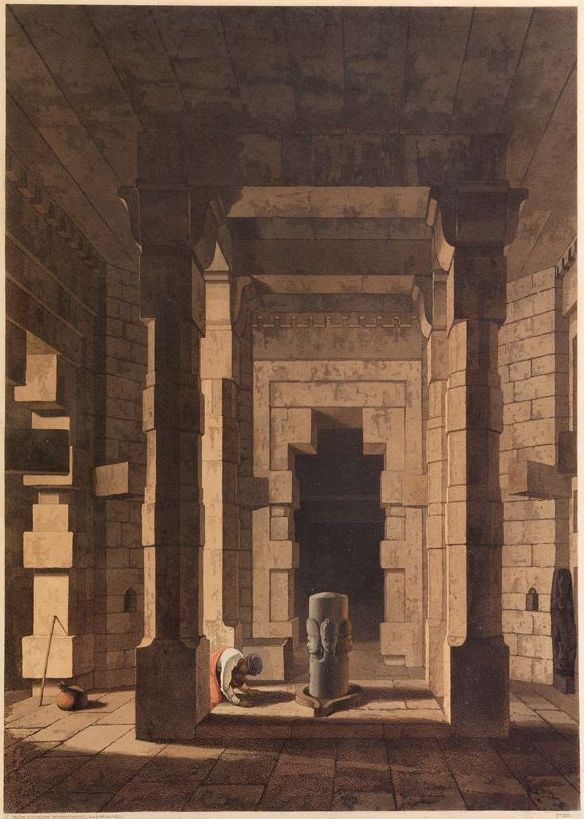
The interior of the Mundeshvari Temple near Ramgarh, by Thomas Daniell

Ramgarh is a 4th most developed city of Kaimur district in Bihar.

It is 30 km north to district headquarter Bhabua and 15 km from District Sub Headquarter Mohania.

Ramgarh is well connected with Buxar, Arrah and Patna via NH-319A and NH-922.

It is also well connected with other major cities of India like Varanasi, Agra, Kanpur, Delhi and Kolkata via NH-19(AH-1) or GT Road.

Ramgarh is also an Assembly constituency.

Pin Code: 821110.
