= Kishunpur (village) =

Village in Jaunpur, Uttar Pradesh, India

Kishunpur is a village in Jaunpur, Uttar Pradesh, India.
