= National Highway 19 (India) =

National highway in India

National Highway 19
- Map of National Highway 19 in red
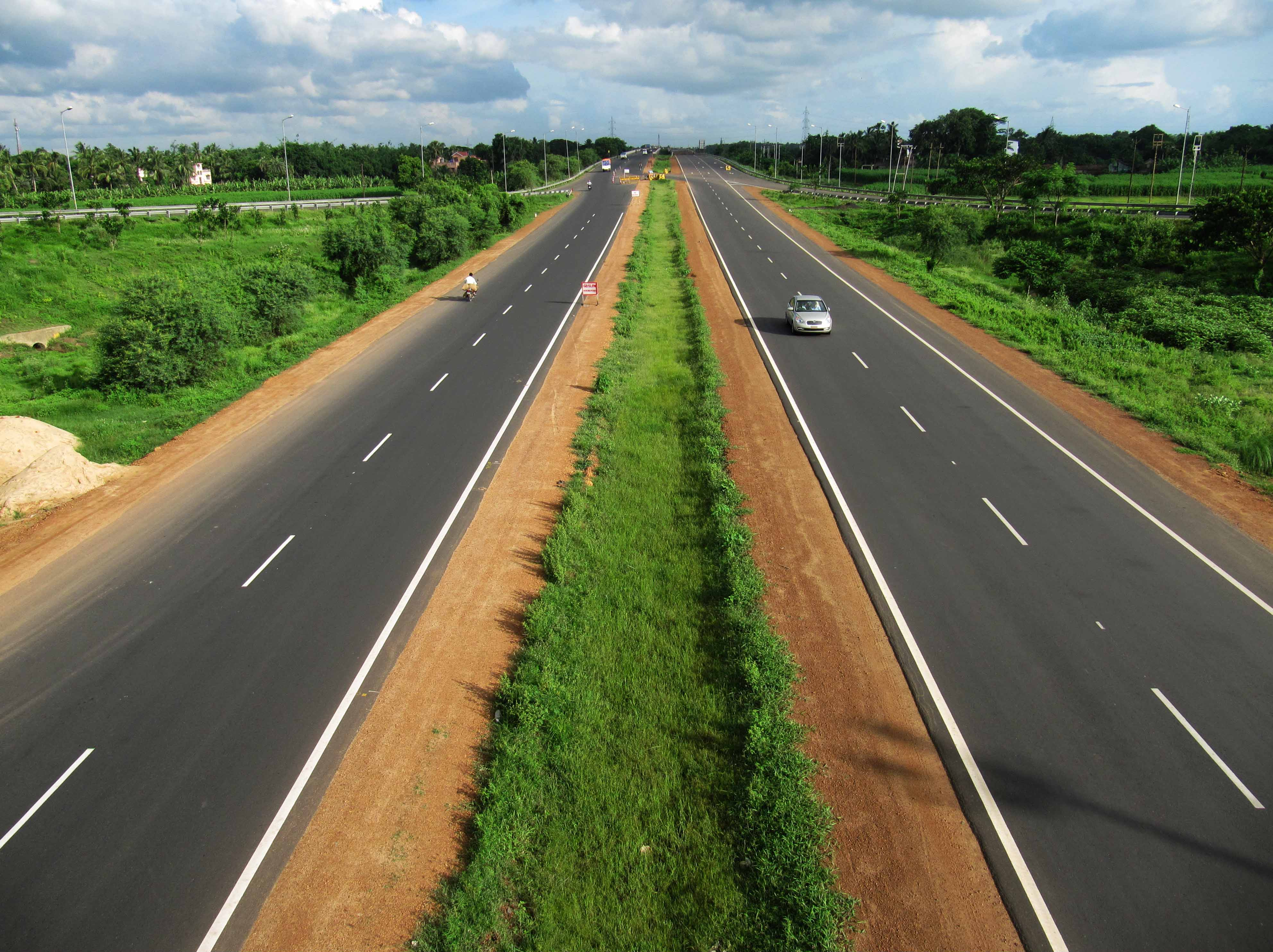
- Durgapur Expressway - NH 19, West Bengal

Route information
- Part of AH1; AH20
- Length: 1,323 km (822 mi)

Major junctions
- West end: Agra, Uttar Pradesh
- East end: Dankuni, West Bengal

Location
- Country: India
- States: Uttar Pradesh, Bihar, Jharkhand, West Bengal
- Primary destinations: Etawah, Kanpur, Fatehpur, Prayagraj, Varanasi, Mughalsarai, Sasaram, Aurangabad, Dhanbad, Asansol, Durgapur

Highway system
- Roads in India; Expressways; National; State; Asian
← NH 18	→ NH 20

National Highway 19 (NH 19) is a six lane national highway in India. It was previously referred to as Delhi–Kolkata Road and is one of the busiest national highways in India. After renumbering of national highways, the Delhi–Agra route is now national highway 44 and the Agra–Kolkata route is numbered national highway 19. It constitutes a major portion of the Indian section of the historical Grand Trunk Road. It is also part of AH1 of Asian Highway Network, that traverses from Japan to Turkey.

It was earlier known as NH 2 (Old) before renumbering of all national highways by Ministry of Road Transport and Highways in 2010.

== Length ==
The highway has a length of 1,269.7 km (789.0 mi) and runs through the states of Uttar Pradesh, Bihar, Jharkhand, and West Bengal.

The lengths of the highway in each state are:

- Uttar Pradesh: 655.2 km (407.1 mi)
- Bihar: 206 km (128 mi)
- Jharkhand: 199.8 km (124.1 mi)
- West Bengal: 208.7 km (129.7 mi)

== National Highways Development Project ==
Schematic map of National Highways in India

- Almost all of the 1,269.7 km (789.0 mi) stretch of NH 19 has been selected as a part of the Golden Quadrilateral by the National Highways Development Project.
- Approximately 35 km (22 mi) stretch of NH 19 between Barah and Kanpur has been selected as a part of the East-West Corridor by the National Highways Development Project.

== Route ==
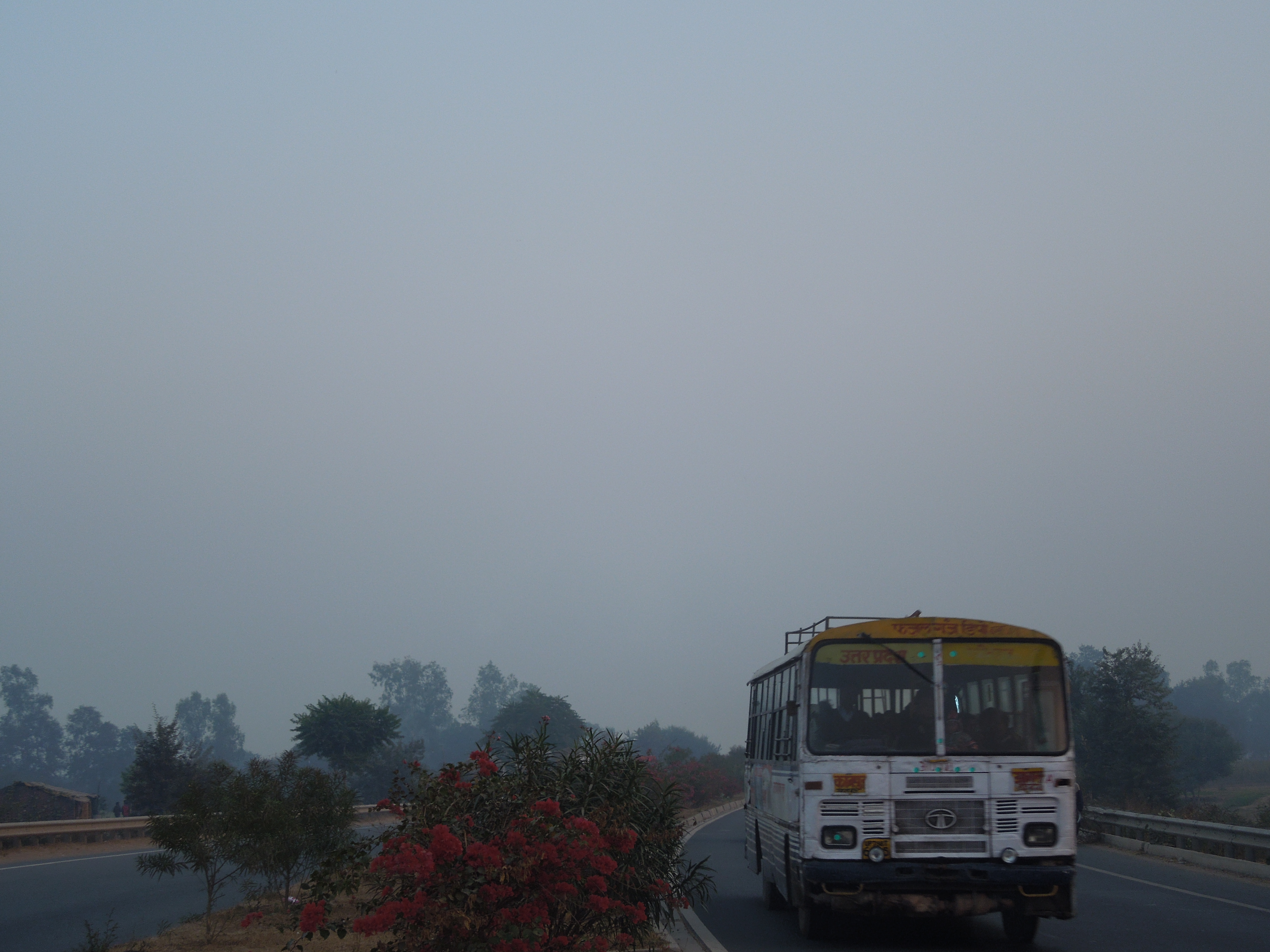
NH-19, Khaga, Fatehpur district, Uttar Pradesh.

National Highway 19 connects Agra to Kolkata and transits four states of India, namely Uttar Pradesh, Bihar, Jharkhand and west Bengal.

NH 19 starts at Agra from its junction with NH-44 connecting Kanpur, Allahabad, Varanasi in the State of Uttar Pradesh, Mohania, Sasaram, Dehri On Sone, Aurangabad, Dobhi(Gaya) in the State of Bihar, Barhi(Hazaribagh), Bagodar(Giridih), Gobindpur(Dhanbad) in the State of Jharkhand, Asansol, Durgapur, and terminating at its junction with NH-16 near Kolkata in the State of West Bengal.

== Toll plazas ==
From Agra to Kolkata the toll plazas are as follows:

Uttar Pradesh
Tundla, Gurau Semra Atikabad, Anantram, Barajod, Badauri, Katoghan, Prayagraj Bypass (Khokhraj), Lalanagar, Daffi, Varanasi
Bihar
Mohania, Sasaram, Saukala
Jharkhand
Rasoiya Dhamna, Ghangri, Beliyad
West Bengal
Durgapur, Palsit and Dankuni.

== Major cities on/off NH 19 ==
Uttar Pradesh

- Mathura
- Agra
- Firozabad
- Etawah
- Babarpur Ajitmal
- Auraiya
- Akbarpur
- Kanpur
- Fatehpur
- Prayagraj
- Bhadohi
- Mirzapur
- Varanasi
- Mughalsarai
- Chandauli

Bihar

- Mohania
- Kudra
- Sasaram
- Dehri on sone
- Aurangabad
- Sherghati

Jharkhand

- Barhi
- Barkatha
- Bagodar
- Isri
- Gobindpur
- Dhanbad

West Bengal

- Asansol
- Durgapur
- Burdwan
- Dankuni

== Junctions ==
Uttar Pradesh
NH 48 Terminal near Agra.
Interchange with Agra Lucknow Expressway near village Kathphori
NH 234 near Etawah
NH 719 near Etawah
NH 519 near Sikandara
NH 27 near Akbarpur, Kanpur Dehat
NH 34 near Kanpur
NH 335 near Fatehpur
NH 731A near Muratganj
NH 30 near Allahabad
NH 330 near Soraon
NH 319D near Prayagraj
NH 135A near Aura
NH 35 near Varanasi
NH 219 near Chandauli
NH 24 near Saiyad Raja
Bihar
NH 219 near Mohania
NH 319 near Mohania
NH 119 near Dehri
NH 139 near Aurangabad
NH 22 near Dobhi
Jharkhand
NH 20 near Barhi
NH 522 near Bagodar
NH 114A near Dumri
NH 18 near Gobindpur
NH 419 near Gobindpur

West Bengal
NH 419 near Kulti
NH 14 near Raniganj
NH 114 near Bardhaman
NH 116A near Bardhaman
NH 16 Terminal near Kolkata.

== See also ==
- List of national highways in India
- List of national highways in India by state
- Howrah-Gaya-Delhi line railway track connecting Delhi and Kolkata
- National Highway 2 (India, old numbering)
- Grand Trunk Road
