= Maharajpur, Kanpur =

Maharajpur, Kanpur Maharajpur
- town
- Location in Uttar Pradesh, India
- Coordinates: 26°20′0″N 80°29′0″E
- Country: India
- State: Uttar Pradesh
- District: Kanpur

Languages
  - Official: Hindi
- Time zone: UTC+5:30 (IST)
- 209402: 209402
- Vehicle registration: UP-78
- Coastline: 0 kilometres (0 mi)

Maharajpur is a town in Kanpur district in the state of Uttar Pradesh, India located at an elevation of 121 m above MSL. Maharajpur is well connected by rail and road.
