= List of canals in India =

This is a list of canals in India.

- Agra canal
- Sethusamudram Shipping Canal Project
- Buckingham Canal
- Handri-Neeva
- K. C. Canal
- Conolly Canal
- Munak canal
- Western Yamuna Canal
- Eastern Yamuna Canal
- Kutte Kol
- Nallah Mar
- Tsoont Kol
- Buddha Nullah
- Indira Gandhi Canal
- Sirhind Canal
- Sutlej Yamuna link canal
- Anupgarh canal
- Ganges Canal
- Ummed Sagar Bandh
- Ainsley canal
- Kalingarayan Canal
- Lower Bhavani Project Canal
- Tamirabarani–Nambiar link canal
- Telugu Ganga project
- Kakatiya Canal
- Zamania Canal
- Karmanasa Canal
- Deokali Canal
- Durgavati Canal
- Najafgarh drain
- Narmada Canal
- Parvathi Puthannaar
- Soundane Cut
- Thiruvananthapuram–Shoranur canal
- Cumbarjua Canal, Goa

== See also ==
- List of national waterways in India
- List of canals
- List of rivers of India
