= Karmanasa River =

Location
- Country: India
- State: Uttar Pradesh, Bihar

Physical characteristics
- Source
  - location: Sarodag, Kaimur district, Kaimur Range
  - elevation: 350 m (1,150 ft)
- Mouth: Ganges
  - location: Chausa, Buxar district
  - coordinates: 25°30′54″N 83°52′30″E
- Length: 192 km (119 mi)
- Width
  - average: 385 ft

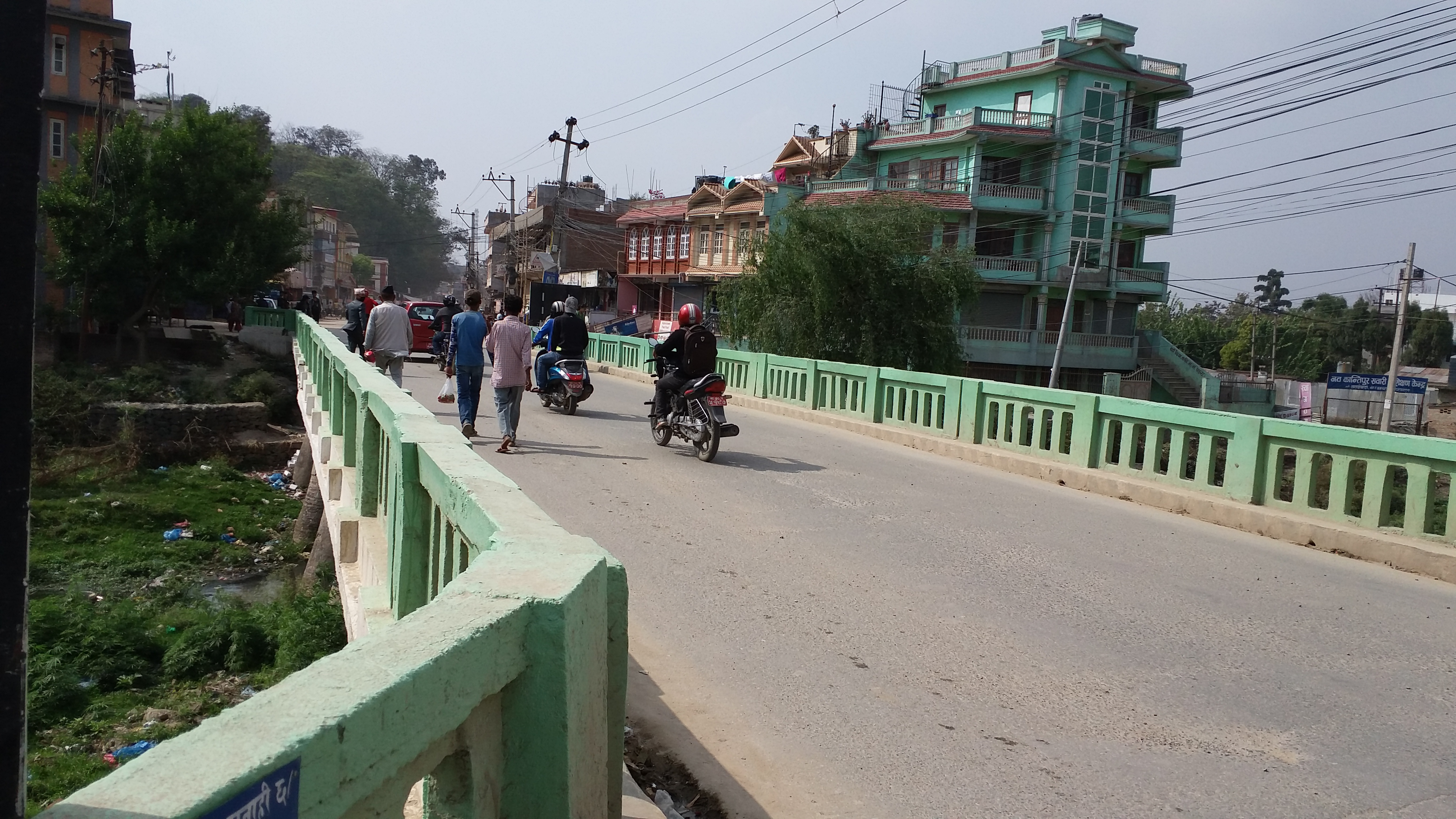
Karmanasa bridge at Hattiban, Lalitpur. Karmanasa river flows south to north direction

The Karamnasa or Karmanasa River (Hindi: कर्मनाशा नदी) is a tributary of the Ganges. It originates in Kaimur district of Bihar and flows through the Indian states of Uttar Pradesh and Bihar. Along the boundary between Uttar Pradesh and Bihar it has the districts of Sonbhadra, Chandauli, Varanasi and Ghazipur on its left (UP side); and the districts of Kaimur and Buxar on its right (Bihar side).

== Disambiguation ==
Karmanasa is also the name of a river in the Garhwal Himalayas.

== Etymology ==
The name of the river means "destroyer of religious merit". There are several legends about it.

According to one legend, the sage Vishvamitra through tapasya (penance, meditation and correct practices) acquired the power to create a whole new universe. When he set out to create a new universe it aroused consternation in Indra. However, he continued and after creating a copy of our universe, he started creating people, the first being Trishanku whom he decided to send up to rule his new universe. Indra stopped his progress. That is how Trishanku ended up suspended head down in mid-air. The Karmanasa was born out of the saliva dripping from his mouth.

== Course ==
The Karmanasa originates at a height of 350 metres (1,150 ft) on the northern face of Kaimur Range near Sarodag in Kaimur district of Bihar. It flows in a north-westerly direction through the plains of Mirzapur, then forms the boundary between Uttar Pradesh and Bihar, and finally joins the Ganges near Village Bara (East Side) Ghazipur Uttar Pradesh and Chausa (Bihar). The length of the river is 192 kilometres (119 mi), out of which 116 kilometres (72 mi) lies in Uttar Pradesh and the rest 76 kilometres (47 mi) forms the boundary between Uttar Pradesh (Bara-Ghazipur) and Bihar (Chausa). Total drainage area of the Karmnasa along with its tributaries is 11,709 square kilometres (4,521 sq mi).

=== Tributaries ===
Its tributaries are the Durgavati, the Chandraprabha, the Karunuti, the Nadi, the Goriya and the Khajuri.

=== Waterfalls ===
The Karmanasa reaches the plains by a succession of leaps, including three falls known as the Karkatgarh, Devdari and the Chhanpathar, which, from their height and beauty, are deserving of special notice. Chhanpathar Falls is 100 feet (30 m) high. Devdari Falls, at an edge of the Rohtas Plateau, along the course of the Karmanasa is 58 metres (190 ft) high. However, Chandauli district administration mentions Devdari Fall as being on the Chandraprabha River.

=== Dams and bridges ===
There are two dams across the Karmanasa – the Latif Shah bund and the Nuagarh dam. There also is a dam across the Chandraprabha.

The Grand Trunk Road passes over a bridge on the Karmanasa.

== Archaeology ==
UP State Archaeology department under the direction of Rakesh Tewari, excavations has unearthed iron artifacts dated between 1200 – 1300 BC at Raja Nal Ka Tila site in Karmanasa river valley of north Sonebhadra. It throws new light on the history of iron-making in India.

== History ==
The Karmnasa was the western boundary of the Sena dynasty.

At the Battle of Chausa, situated on the banks of the Karmanasa, on 26 June 1539, Sher Shah defeated the Mughal emperor Humayun and assumed the royal title of Farīd al-Dīn Shēr Shah.

== See also ==
- Besu River
- Gangi River
- Eknaiya River
- Kodra River
- Suar River
- Karmanasa Canal
