= Vindhya Range =

Series of mountain ranges and highlands in north-central India

- Vindhyachal, Vindhyas
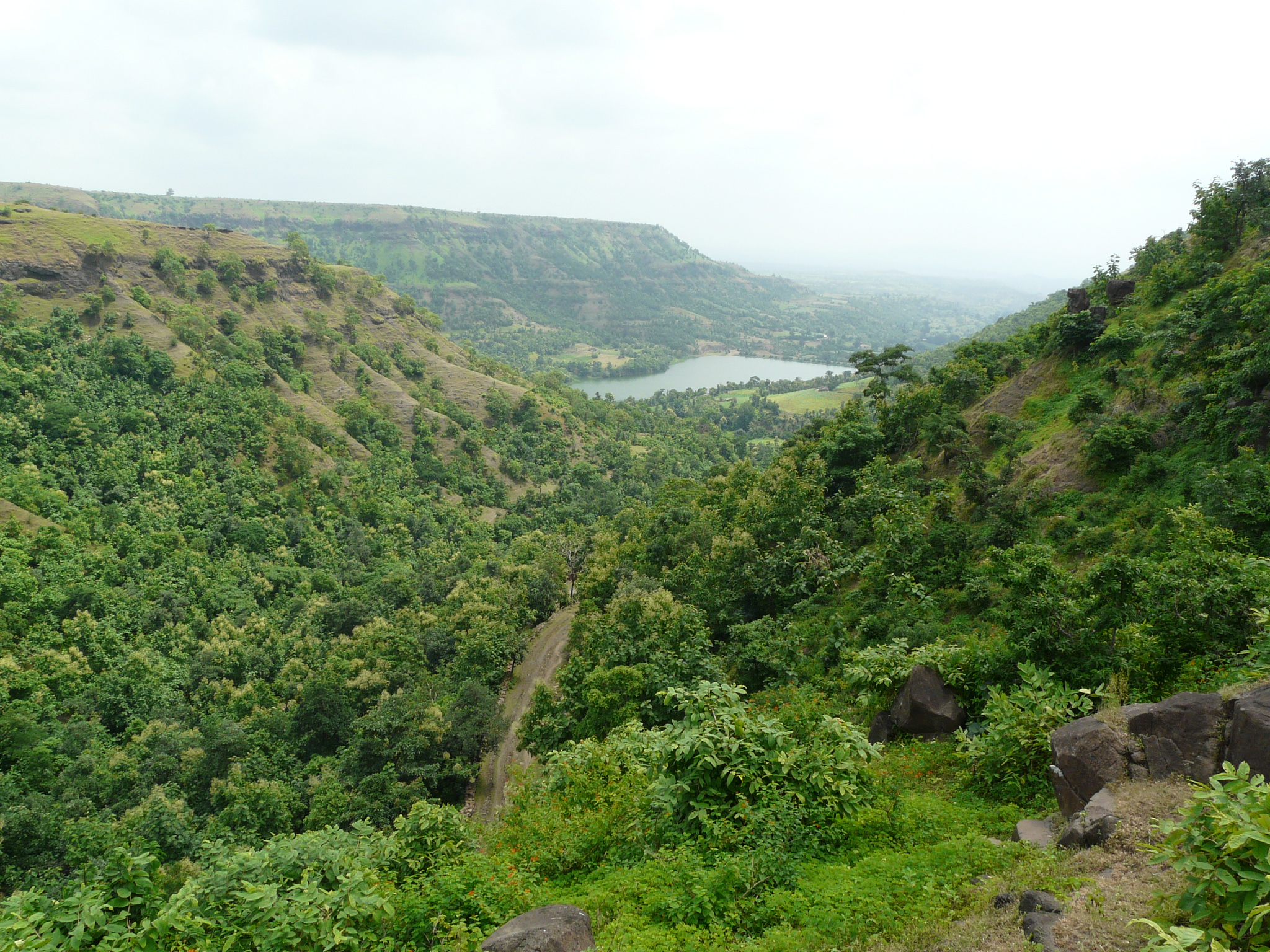

Highest point
- Elevation: 752 m (2,467 ft)
- Coordinates: 23°28′0″N 79°44′25″E

Naming
- Etymology: "Obstructor" or "Hunter" (Sanskrit)

Geography
- Location within India
- Country: India
- States: Madhya Pradesh; Chhattisgarh; Gujarat; Southern parts of Uttar Pradesh; Bihar
- Borders on: Satpura Range; Chota Nagpur Plateau

The Vindhya Range (IPA: [ʋɪnd̪ʱjə], also known as Vindhyachal) is a complex, discontinuous chain of mountain ridges, hill ranges, highlands and plateau escarpments in west-central India.

Technically, the Vindhyas do not form a single mountain range in the geological sense. The exact extent of the Vindhyas is loosely defined, and historically, the term covered a number of distinct hill systems in central India, including the one that is now known as the Satpura Range. Today, the term principally refers to the escarpment and its hilly extensions that runs north of and roughly parallel to the Narmada River in Madhya Pradesh. Depending on the definition, the range extends up to Gujarat in the west, Uttar Pradesh and Bihar in the north, and Chhattisgarh in the east. The average elevation of the Vindhyas is also dependent on different sources.

The Vindhyas hold great significance in Indian mythology and history. Several ancient texts mention the Vindhya Range as the southern boundary of Āryāvarta, the region associated with Vedic culture around 1500–1200 BCE. However, the meaning of this term evolved in later Vedic texts to refer to the entire Indian subcontinent. Since there is no clear evidence of settled societies in southern India during this period, it remains debated whether the Vindhyas represented a cultural boundary or simply the southern limit of the settled societies known at the time. Some evidence suggests that Āryāvarta was a cultural term meaning the "land of the Aryans" (often interpreted as the "land of the noble ones"), rather than a strictly geographic designation. Ancient texts also describe people from regions south of the Vindhyas as Arya, suggesting that the cultural boundaries were fluid and changed over time. The former Indian state of Vindhya Pradesh was named after the Vindhya Range.

== Etymology and names ==
According to the author of a commentary on Amarakosha, the word Vindhya derives from the Sanskrit word vaindh (to obstruct). A mythological story (see below) states that the Vindhyas once obstructed the path of the sun, resulting in this name. The Ramayana states that the great mountain Vindhya that was growing incessantly and obstructing the path of the Sun stopped growing any more in obedience to Agastya's words. According to another theory, the name "Vindhya" means "hunter" in Sanskrit, and may refer to the tribal hunter-gatherers inhabiting the region.

The Vindhya range is also known as "Vindhyachala" or "Vindhyachal"; the suffix achala (Sanskrit) or achal (Hindi) refers to a mountain. In the Mahabharata, the range is also referred to as Vindhyapadaparvata. The Greek geographer Ptolemy called the range Vindius or Ouindion, describing it as the source of Namados (Narmada) and Nanagouna (Tapti) rivers. The "Daksinaparvata" ("Southern Mountain") mentioned in the Kaushitaki Upanishad is also identified with the Vindhyas.

== Extent ==
The Vindhyas do not form a single range in the proper geological sense: the hills collectively known as the Vindhyas do not lie along an anticlinal or synclinal ridge. The Vindhya range is actually a group of discontinuous chain of mountain ridges, hill ranges, highlands and plateau escarpments. The term "Vindhyas" is defined by convention, and therefore, the exact definition of the Vindhya range has varied at different times in history.

=== Historical definitions ===
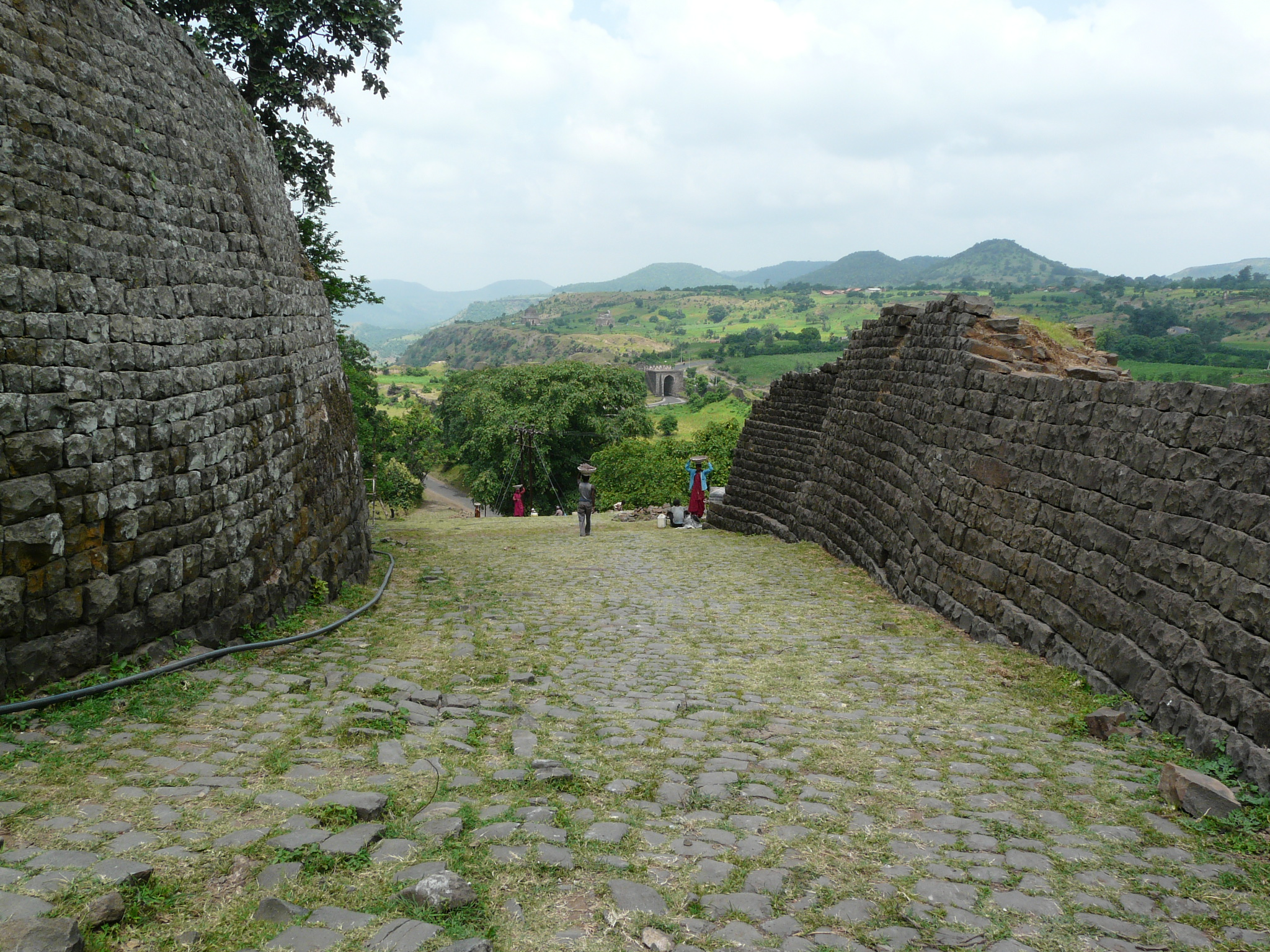
Vindhya range seen from Mandav, Madhya Pradesh

Earlier, the term "Vindhyas" was used in a wider sense and included a number of hill ranges between the Indo-Gangetic Plain and the Deccan Plateau. According to the various definitions mentioned in the older texts, the Vindhyas extend up to the Godavari in the south and the Ganges in the north.

In certain Puranas, the term Vindhya specifically covers the mountain range located between the Narmada and the Tapti rivers; that is, the one which is now known as the Satpura Range. The Varaha Purana uses the name "Vindhya-pada" ("foot of the Vindhyas") for the Satpura range.

Several ancient Indian texts and inscriptions (e.g. the Nasik Prasasti of Gautamiputra Satakarni) mention three mountain ranges in Central India: Vindhya (or "Vindhya proper"), Rksa (also Rksavat or Riksha) and Pariyatra (or Paripatra). The three ranges are included in the seven Kula Parvatas ("clan mountains") of Bharatavarsha, that is, India. The exact identification of these three ranges is difficult due to contrasting descriptions in the various texts. For example, the Kurma, Matsya and Brahmanda Puranas mention Vindhya as the source of Tapti; while Vishnu and Brahma Puranas mention the Rksa as its source. Some texts use the term Vindhyas to describe all the hills in Central India.

In one passage, Valmiki's Ramayana describes Vindhya as being situated to the south of Kishkindha (Ramayana IV-46. 17), which is identified with a part of the present-day Karnataka. It further implies that the sea was located just to the south of the Vindhyas, and Lanka was located across this sea. Many scholars have attempted to explain this anomaly in different ways. According to one theory, the term "Vindhyas" covered a number of mountains to the south of the Indo-Aryan territories at the time Ramayana was written. Others, such as Frederick Eden Pargiter, believe that there was another mountain in South India, with the same name. Madhav Vinayak Kibe placed the location of Lanka in Central India.

The Barabar Cave inscription of the Maukhari ruler Anantavarman mentions the Nagarjuni hill of Bihar as a part of the Vindhyas.

=== Present-day definition ===
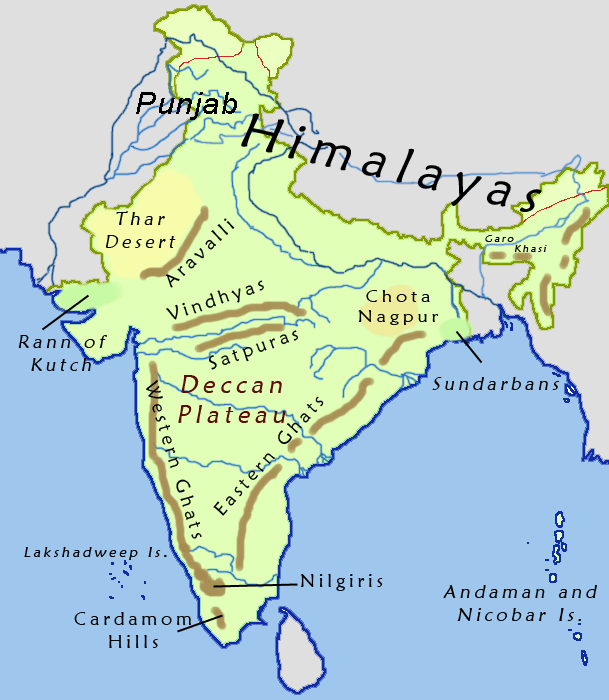
Map of prominent mountain ranges in India, showing Vindhyas in central India

Today, the definition of the Vindhyas is primarily restricted to the Central Indian escarpments, hills and highlands located to the north of the Narmada River. Some of these are actually distinct hill systems.

The western end of the Vindhya range is located in the state of Gujarat, near the state's border with Rajasthan and Madhya Pradesh, at the eastern side of the Kathiawar peninsula. A series of hills connects the Vindhya extension to the Aravalli Range near Champaner. The Vindhya range rises in height east of Chhota Udaipur.

The principal Vindhya range forms the southern escarpment of the Central Indian upland. It runs roughly parallel to the Naramada river in the east–west direction, forming the southern wall of the Malwa plateau in Madhya Pradesh.

The eastern portion of the Vindhyas comprises multiple chains, as the range divides into branches east of Malwa. A southern chain of Vindhyas runs between the upper reaches of the Son and Narmada rivers to meet the Satpura Range in the Maikal Hills near Amarkantak. A northern chain of the Vindhyas continues eastwards as Bhander Plateau and Kaimur Range, which runs north of the Son River. This extended range runs through what was once Vindhya Pradesh, reaching up to the Kaimur district of Bihar. The branch of the Vindhya range spanning across Bundelkhand is known as the Panna range. Another northern extension (known as the Vindhyachal hills) runs up to Uttar Pradesh, stopping before the shores of Ganga at multiple places, including Vindhyachal and Chunar in Mirzapur District.

The Vindhyan tableland is a plateau that lies to the north of the central part of the range. The Rewa-Panna plateaus are also collectively known as the Vindhya plateau.

== Elevation ==
Different sources vary on the average elevation of the Vindhyas, depending on their definition of the range. M. C. Chaturvedi mentions the average elevation as 300 metres (980 ft). Pradeep Sharma states that the "general elevation" of the Vindhyas is 300–650 metres (980–2,130 ft), with the range rarely going over 700 metres (2,300 ft) during its 1,200 kilometres (750 mi) extent.

The highest point of the Vindhyas is the Sad-bhawna Shikhar ("Goodwill Peak"), which lies 752 metres (2,467 ft) above the sea level. Also known as the Kalumar peak or Kalumbe peak, it lies near Singrampur in the Damoh district, in the area known as Bhanrer or Panna hills. Historical texts include Amarkantak (1,000 m+ or 3,300 ft+) in the Vindhyas, but today, it is considered a part of the Maikal Range, which is considered as an extension of the Satpuras.

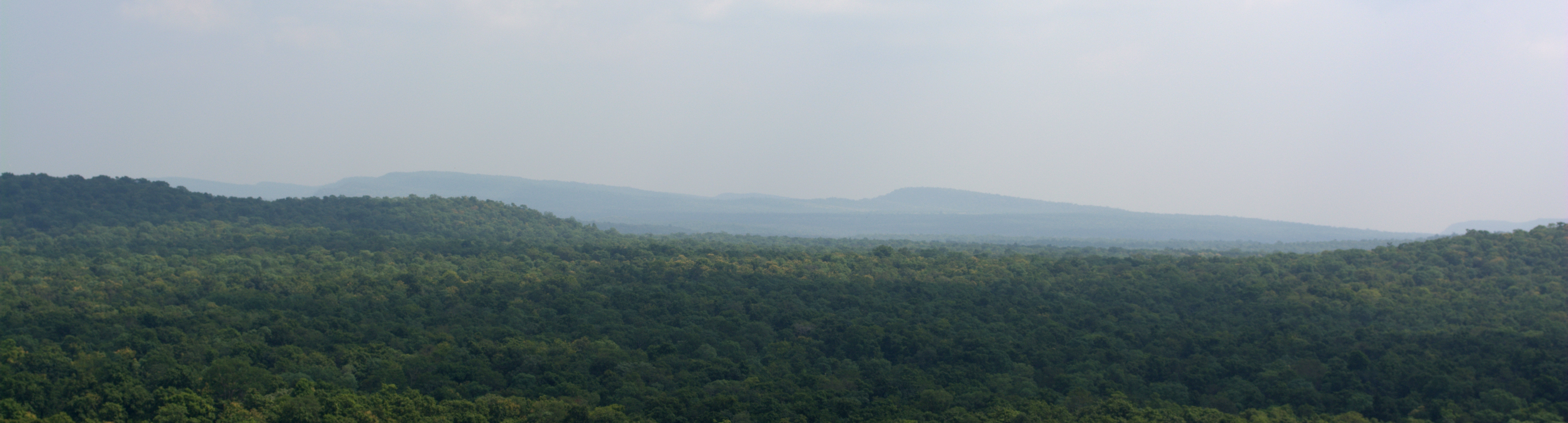
Vindhyas as seen from Bhimbetka

== Cultural significance ==
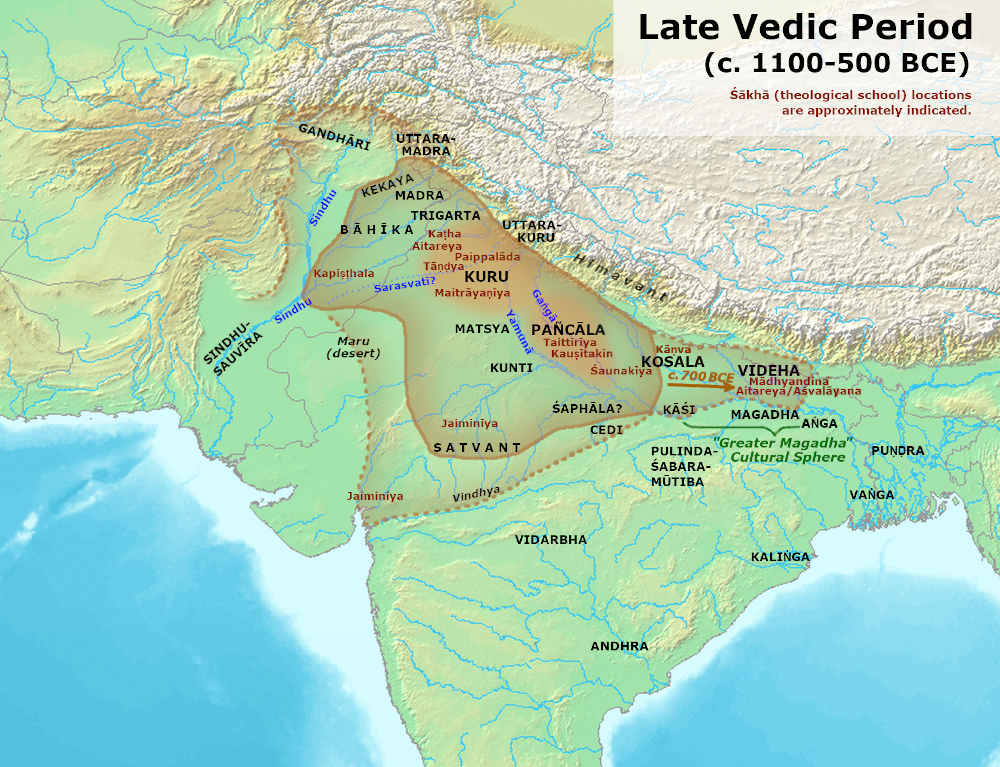
The Vindhyas are seen as the southern boundary of Aryavarta in this map. Note that historically, the term "Vindhyas" covered the Satpura range that lies to the south of Narmada.

The Vindhyas are regarded as the traditional geographical boundary between northern and southern India, and have a distinguished status in both mythology and geography of India. In the ancient Indian texts, the Vindhyas are seen as the demarcating line between the territories of the Indo-Aryans and that of the others. The most ancient Hindu texts consider it as the southern boundary of Aryavarta. The Mahabharata mentions that the Nishadas and other Mleccha tribes reside in the forests of the Vindhyas. Although the Indo-Aryan languages (such as Marathi and Konkani) spread to the south of Vindhyas later, the Vindhyas continued to be seen as the traditional boundary between the north and the south of India.

Vindhyas appear prominently in the Indian mythological tales. Although the Vindhyas are not very high, historically, they were considered highly inaccessible and dangerous due to dense vegetation and the hostile tribes residing there. In the older Sanskrit texts, such as the Ramayana, they are described as the unknown territory infested with cannibals and demons. The later texts describe the Vindhya range as the residence of fierce form of Shakti (goddess Kali or Durga), who has lived there since slaying the demons. She is described as Vindhyavasini ("Vindhya dweller"), and a temple dedicated to her is located in the Vindhyachal town of Uttar Pradesh. The Mahabharata mentions the Vindhyas as the "eternal abode" of Kali.

According to one legend, the Vindhya mountain once competed with the Mount Meru, growing so high that it obstructed the sun. The sage Agastya then asked Vindhya to lower itself, in order to facilitate his passage across to the south. In reverence for Agastya, the Vindhya lowered its height and promised not to grow until Agastya returned to the north. Agastya settled in the south, and the Vindhya mountain, true to its word, never grew further.

The Kishkindha Kanda of Valmiki's Ramayana mentions that Maya built a mansion in the Vindhyas. In Dashakumaracharita, the King Rajahamsa of Magadha and his ministers create a new colony in the Vindhya forest, after being forced out of their kingdom following a war defeat.

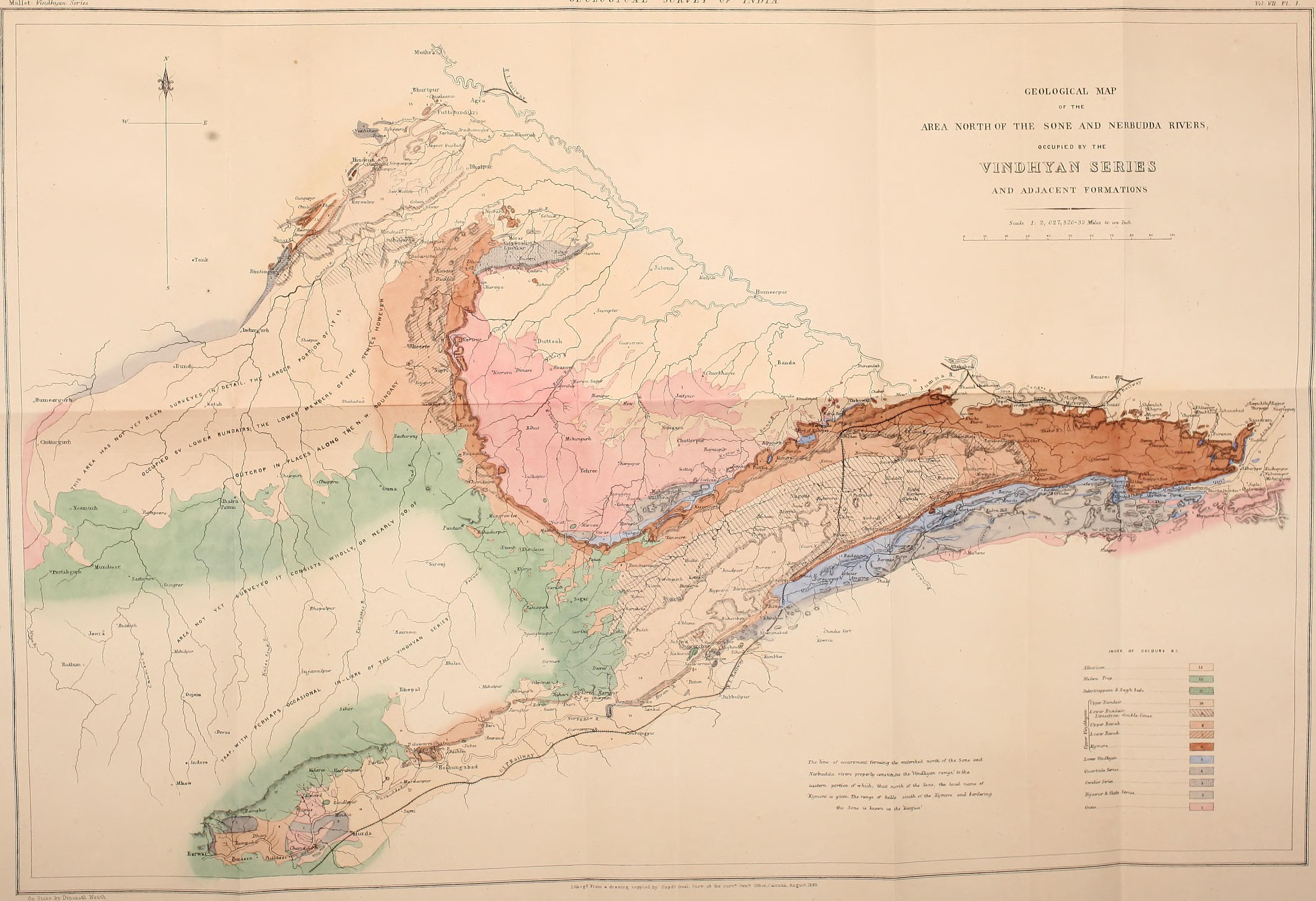
A map of the "Vindhyan Series" from Geological Survey of India (1871)

The Vindhyas are one of the only two mountain ranges mentioned in the national anthem of India, the other being the Himalayas.

== Rivers ==
Several tributaries of the Ganga-Yamuna system originate from the Vindhyas. These include Chambal, Betwa, Dhasan, Sunar, Ken, Tamsa, Kali Sindh and Parbati. The northern slopes of the Vindhyas are drained by these rivers.

Narmada and Son rivers drain the southern slopes of the Vindhyas. Both these rivers rise in the Maikal Hills, which are now defined as an extension of the Satpuras, although several older texts use the term Vindhyas to cover them (see Historical definitions above).

== Geology and palaeontology ==
The "Vindhyan Supergroup" is one of the largest and thickest sedimentary successions in the world.

What may be the earliest known multicellular fossils of eukaryotes (filamentous algae) have been discovered from Vindhya basin, possibly as much as 1.6 to 1.7 billion years old. Shelled creatures are documented to have first evolved in the late Ediacaran, near the start of the Cambrian 'explosion of life,' about 550 million years ago.

== See also ==
- Geology of India
- Geology of the Himalayas
- Central Highlands (India)
