= Suar River =

Suar River Suwara River, Bhabua River

Location
- Country: India
- State: Bihar
- District: Kaimur, Rohtas

Physical characteristics
- Mouth: Durgavati River
- Length: 61 km (38 mi)
- Width
  - average: 156 ft

Suar or Suwara is a small river located in Kaimur District of Bihar, India. It is a tributary of Durgawati River. It flows through the Districts of Rohtas and Kaimur.
