= Rohtas Plateau =

Mountain range in Bihar, India

- रोहतास पठार
- Location within India

Highest point
- Coordinates: 24°30′N 83°45′E

Geography
- Location: Bihar, India

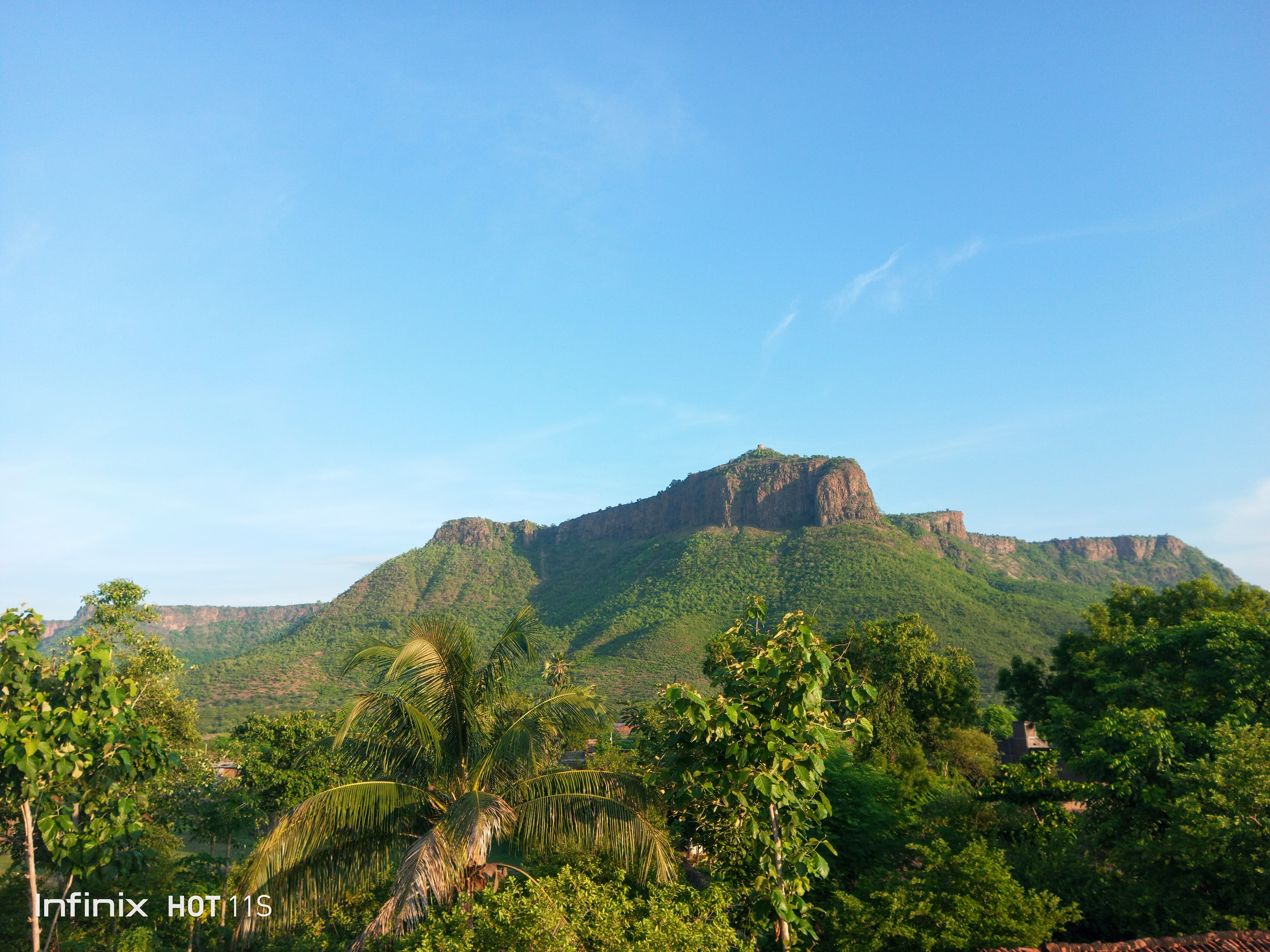
Extension of Rohtas Platue, also known as Kaimur Platue in the South-west district of Bihar(Rohtas).

The Rohtas Plateau (also referred to as Kaimur Plateau) is a plateau that lies in the south-western part of the Indian state of Bihar.

== Surrounding geography ==
A series of fluvial plateaux that run along the Kaimur Range consist of a series of descending plateaux, starting with the Panna Plateau in the west, followed by Bhander Plateau and Rewa Plateau and ending with Rohtas plateau in the east. The Kaimur or the Rohtas Plateau region was earlier the hideouts of the dreaded dacoits like Ramashish Koeri and Rambachan Yadav.

== Description ==
The Rohtas Plateau or Kaimur Plateau comprises about 800 square miles (2,100 km^{2}). It is an undulating table land. At Rohtasgarh it attains a height of 1,490 feet (450 m) above sea level. Torrential hill streams have cut deep gorges at the borders of the plateau. Rising abruptly from the plains the sides of the plateau presents a sight of a sharp escarpment. The roof of the tableland at the top is full of small saucer shaped valleys. The rivers flowing over the edges of the plateau and into the deep gorges form numerous waterfalls, with a drop varying from two hundred to six hundred feet. The road approaches to the plateau from the plains are difficult. The ghats leading from Akbarpur to Rohtas are the most moderate. those from Bhagwanpur, south of Bhabua to Karar are also fairly good. There are other tolerable ascents at Sarki near the south-western boundary, at Kariyari Khoh in the deep gorge north of Rohtas, at Ghoraghat, two miles south of Sasaram, and on the extreme west where a ghat leads up to Chhanpathar.

There is a well-marked fall line along the plateaux lining the Kaimur Range and hundreds of waterfalls ranging in height between 15m and 180m are found along this fault line. Significant waterfalls along Rohtas Plateau are: Devdari Falls (58m) on the Karmanasa River, Telharkund Falls (80m) on the Suara West River, Suara Falls (120m) on the Suara East River, Durgawati Falls (80m) on the Durgavati River, Okharean Kund Falls (90m) on Gopath River, Tutla Bhawani Falls, Dhuan Kund Falls (30m) (near Sasaram) on the Dhoba River, Kuaridah Falls (180m) on the Ausane River, a tributary of Son River, and Rakim Kund Falls (168m), on the Gayghat River, a tributary of Ausane, Geeta Ghat fall near Geeta Ghat Ashram river.

== Land ownership ==
The Oraon or Kurukh tribe claims that the place around Rohtasgarh belonged to them before they were driven out from there.
