= Ramashish Koeri gang =

Caste-based bandit group

- Dates active: 1980s
- Groups: Koeri, Binds
- Headquarters: Kaimur pleatue
- Wars: "Caste wars of Bihar"

The Ramashish Singh Koeri gang was a first caste based dacoit band of India, that was led by Ramashish Koeri (also known as Dada). The gang was active in the Kaimur plateau region of Bihar, located in present Rohtas district. Earlier, the gang was led by Mohan Bind, after whose death in a police encounter, Ramashish Koeri became the new leader. The gang, along with four other caste-based gangs led by Ghamari Karwar, Rambachan Yadav, Triveni Kahar, and Gaurik was responsible for over hundred murders in the Kaimur region.

== Formation ==
- Ramashish Bind
  - Mohan Bind
    - Sudama Bind
      - Ramashish Koeri
        - Kameswar Koeri
        - Radhakishan Koeri

According to author Bindeshwar Pathak, the Kaimur pleatue region in 1980s was known for extreme poverty and the feudal set up of the region was dominated by the Rajputs. There were hardly any employment opportunity present and the large population of this region, which was composed of the Scheduled Castes and the poor section of the intermediate castes were suppressed by the elite section of society. The continued repression forced some of the youths into banditry. These bandits organised dacoities and murders of the landlords to come out of their clutches. One of the earliest leader of such a group of bandits was Mohan Bind, who was forced to become a dacoit to avenge the rape of his sister and severe repression by the Rajputs. The police in this region also sided with the Rajputs and latter used to participate in the police operation against the dacoit groups to set their personal scores with the Backwards and the Scheduled Castes. In response to the activities of Mohan Bind, the Rajput landlords started beating their alleged supporters, the ordinary villagers. The rapes were also committed against the women of the Scheduled Castes and Police often acted in the interest of the perpetrators. Mohan Bind also enjoyed support among the Backward Castes of the region and commanded control over thousands of voters, which was essential for any candidate contesting elections from the region's Assembly Constituencies.

The earliest leader of the gang was Ramashish Bind, after whose murder Mohan Bind, who came to be called as "King of Kaimur pleatue" assumed the leadership. After encounter of Mohan Bind, Sudama Bind was being considered as the leader until Ramashish Koeri became the permanent leader. Koeri reorganised the gang afresh but his death once again brought leadership crisis, which was ultimately removed after the rise of Kameswar Koeri, also known as Chhotka Dada. The emergence of this gang led to decline in the influence of local strongman Bajrang Singh, who was forced to shift away from the hills and confine his activities elsewhere.

== Activities ==
This gang, along the with several other bandit groups were responsible for managing polling booths during elections, in favour of their preferred candidate, and hence they enjoyed political support to carry out their activities. The gang was involved in criminal activities which included dacoity, kidnapping and murder. The gang also included members like Daroga Lohar and Narayan Kushwaha; latter used to collect the ransom in cases of kidnapping from the family of the victims. The possible hideouts of these gangsters were the hilly terrain of the Rohtas pleatue, where they used to hide the kidnapped children. In a search operation conducted in these hills, several skeletons of adolescent children were found by the Police.

The Kaimur hills of Rohtas district was considered as the crime hotspot by the Bihar police in the 1980s and 1990s. As per reports, few caste groups had made the criminal activities as their livelihood and there used to be implicit support of the politicians from these particular castes groups to the gangsters and dacoits of their respective castes. Mohan Bind, who was the leader of Ramashish Koeri gang earlier, was known as "Raja" or the "King of Kaimur pleatue". After death of both Ramashish Koeri and Mohan Bind, Kameswar Koeri, who was named in a number of criminal cases became the new leader.

"Kameswar Koeri case" reveals the division in local media, as there emerged a conflict between various regional newspapers over defaming him or portraying him as victim. This case, which attracted attention of the local newspapers in late 1980s, revealed the struggle in between the various caste groups in the society of Bihar. A section of local media published a report branding him as the criminal before any trial in the court of law, to which, Kameswar responded by filing a suit against the respective newspaper houses and the death threats were also sent to the publishers. It was stated that news reports, which wanted to portray him as a criminal and confirmed his membership of the gang of Ramashish Koeri ran as counter to his ambition of joining the active politics. Since, Kameswar was supported by the MLA'S of Bihar Legislative Assembly belonging to his caste and also by the local Mukhiyas, who also hailed from his caste, the defaming news reports were making his entry into the politics of state difficult.

On 14 November 1987, Kameswar Koeri was arrested, while he was collecting ransom at Bhabua, but later he was released on bail. He was also the main accused in "Gopal Sharma murder case" and attack on Indian National Congress leader Surendra Tiwari in 1983. He was named in half dozen other cases too, which included the Chenari massacre 1of 986 and the "1988 Konar massacre" in which he was assisted by Radhakishan Koeri (alias "Langda Dada"). He used to operate from the Sasaram prison, when arrested. In 1992, he was again arrested on charge of possessing lethal weapons but again out on bail. The gang was also responsible for massacre of five members of the Yadav caste on September 22, 1986, which included a woman. This incident broke the lull in the gang wars between the Yadav and Koeri led gangs in Rohtas district. Many sources suggest that gang was responsible for killing persons over than 1000 in number.

== Decline ==
In 1986, Bindeshwari Dubey's government launched Operation Black Panther 2 and later Operation Kaimur was also launched to take on the dacoits and improve law and order situation in the Bhojpur and Kaimur region. In three more operations, about 20 dacoits were killed. Mohan Bind was killed around the same time. Daroga Lohar, one of the core member of the gang who was untraceable by the Bihar police was arrested in 2020, when the Bihar Legislative Assembly elections were going to be held.
