= Narmada Canal =

Narmada Main Canal Sardar Sarovar Canal
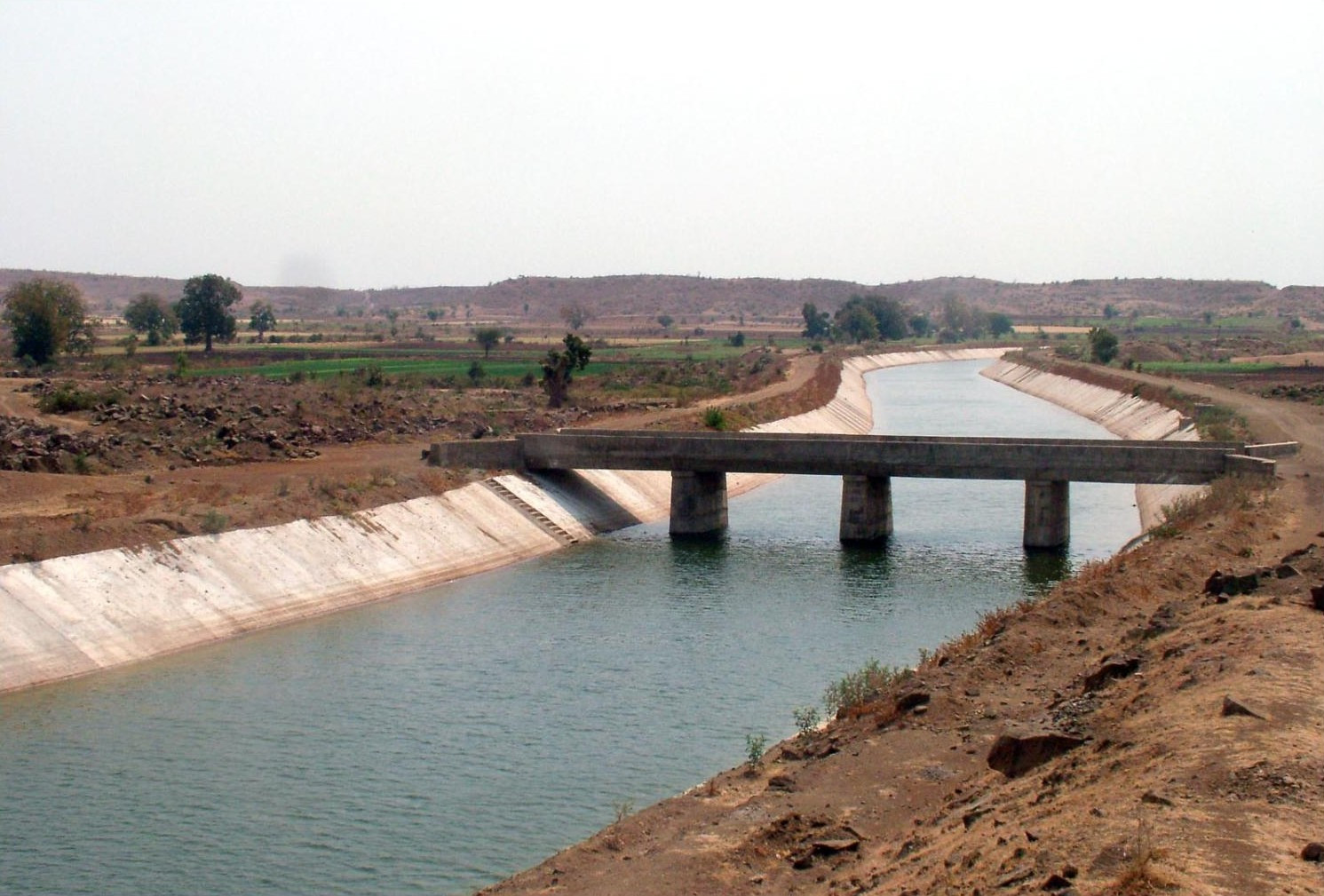
- View of the Kutch Branch Canal of Narmada Main Canal paved with concrete lining, meandering through northwestern India.

Location
- Country: India
- State: Gujarat, Rajasthan

Physical characteristics
- Source: Sardar Sarovar Dam
  - location: Kevadia, Narmada district, Gujarat, India
  - coordinates: 21°49′49″N 73°44′50″E
- Length: 532 km (331 mi)
- Width
  - minimum: 10.3 m (34 ft) Width at tail
  - maximum: 76 m (249 ft) Base Width at source
- Depth
  - maximum: 7.6 m (25 ft) depth at source
- Discharge
  - minimum: 70.79 cumec (~70 m³/s] at tail (Gujarat-Rajasthan Border)
  - maximum: 1132.66 cumec (40000 cusec, ~1100 m³/s) at source

Basin features
- River system: Narmada
- Aforementioned information retrieved from the Narmada Control Authority

The Narmada Canal is a contour canal in Western India that brings water from the Sardar Sarovar Dam to the state of Gujarat, and then into Rajasthan state. The main canal has a length of 532 kilometres (331 mi) (458 kilometres (285 mi) in Gujarat, and then 74 kilometres (46 mi) in Rajasthan). It is the second longest canal in India (after the Indira Gandhi Canal), and the largest canal by water-carrying capacity (40,000 cusec at the source). The main canal is connected with 42 branch canals, providing irrigation to 2,129,000 hectares (5,260,000 acres) of farmland (about 18 lakh hectares in Gujarat, and 2.5 lakh hectares in Rajasthan). The canal is designed to transfer 9.5 million acre-feet (11.7 cubic kilometres) of water annually from the Narmada Basin to areas under other river basins in Gujarat and Rajasthan. (9 MAF for Gujarat, and 0.5 MAF for Rajasthan).

Soon after the completion of the construction project, the Narmada canal was inaugurated on 24 April 2008. It has carrying capacity of 40,000 cubic foot per second (cfs or cusec) at its head in Navagam and is decreased to 2,600 cusecs at Sanchore. On the way, Narmada main canal crosses many rivers and water bodies. The main canal itself can hold 220 MCM (Million cubic metre) of water at full supply depth. It is designed not only for the water supply but also the storage of water to improve the response time of the system.

== Irrigation in Gujarat ==
The main canal has 38 branches in Gujarat.

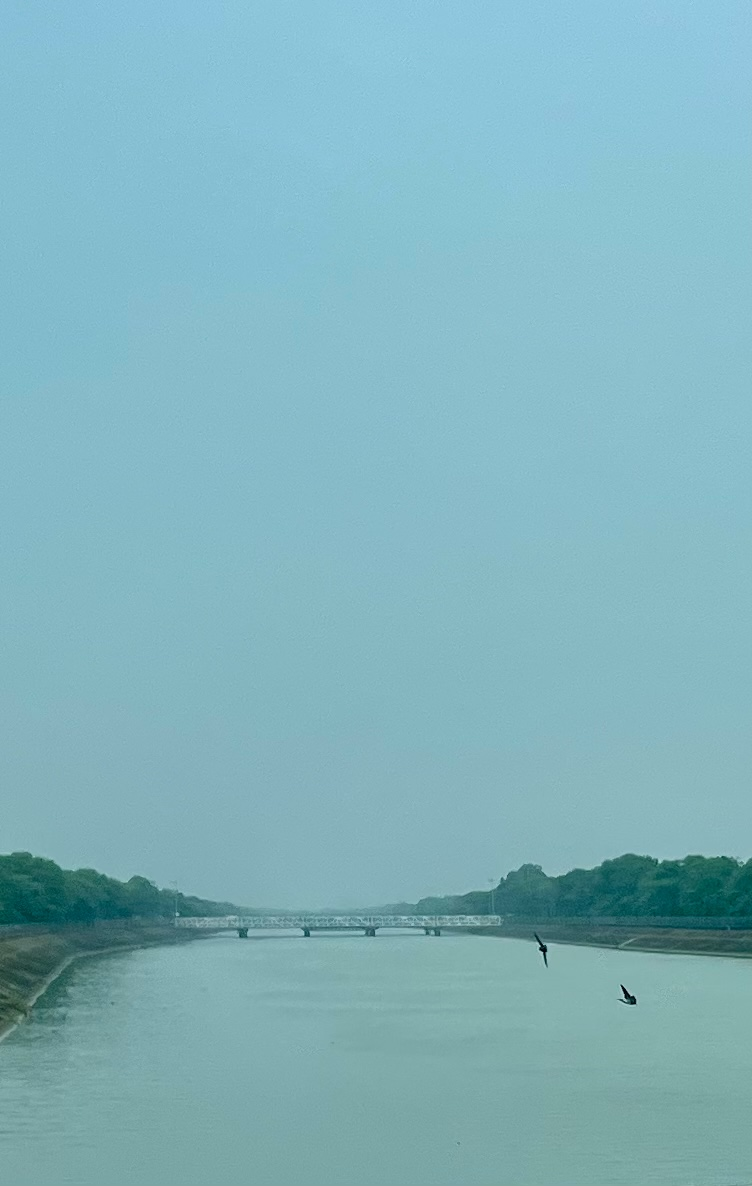
Narmada Canal at Gandhinagar

=== Saurashtra Branch Canal ===
Saurashtra Branch is the largest of these branches which has a length of 104.46 km and discharge of 15,002 cubic feet per second (424.8 m^{3}/s). The Saurashtra branch canal has 3 mini hydroelectricity plants to utilize the energy from water at the fall of 52 metres (171 ft) in first 59 km. Subsequently, in the 59 to 104.46 km span it has five pumping stations to pump the water 66 metres (217 ft) up before tailing into Bhogavo - II reservoir.

== Irrigation in Rajasthan ==
Although the Narmada River does not flow through Rajasthan and no area of Rajasthan falls in the Narmada basin, considerations were made to irrigate its lands with the water from the Narmada River that flows through the neighboring state of Gujarat, to encourage peasants to settle in the areas along the international border with Pakistan. After traversing 458 kilometres (285 mi) in Gujarat, the Narmada canal enters Rajasthan near Shilu in the Sanchor tehsil of Jalore. The 74 kilometres (46 mi) main canal, with 9 major distributaries, serves an area of 1,477 square kilometres (570 sq mi), including 124 villages. In total, it was designed to irrigate 246,000 hectares (610,000 acres) in 233 villages in Jalore and Barmer and provide drinking water to 1,336 villages.

The Narmada canal has a few unique features compared to other projects:

1. Irrigation water is delivered to farmer groups, via Water Users Associations (WUA), not to individual farmers. WUAs are responsible for the operation and maintenance of field water canals.
2. Micro-irrigation systems such as drip and sprinklers to be encouraged for efficient water usage.

== Solar panels ==
Solar canals are being installed along a 1 kilometre (0.62 mi) pilot project section of the Sanand Branch Canal near Chandrasan village to generate 1 megawatt (1,300 hp) of electricity. The solar panels are forecast to also reduce evaporation of water from the canal by 9,000,000 litres (2,000,000 imp gal; 2,400,000 US gal) per year.

== See also ==
- List of canals in India
  - Rajasthan
    - Ganga Canal (Rajasthan)
    - Ramjal Setu link project (ERCP), in Chambal river basin in eastern Rajasthan
    - Indira Gandhi Canal (Rajasthan Canal) in Indus river basin in western Rajasthan
  - Indus Water Treaty (IWT), impacts water supply in Rajasthan
  - Lower Bhavani Project Canal
- List of rivers in India
  - List of rivers of Rajasthan
  - Rivers and dams of Jammu and Kashmir
  - Peninsular River System Of India
  - Rigvedic rivers
- Ministry of Jal Shakti
  - Irrigation in India
  - river interlinking project
  - List of dams and reservoirs in India
  - List of megaprojects in India
