= Ganga Canal (Rajasthan) =

Irrigation system of canals

Gang Canal (Bikaner canal)
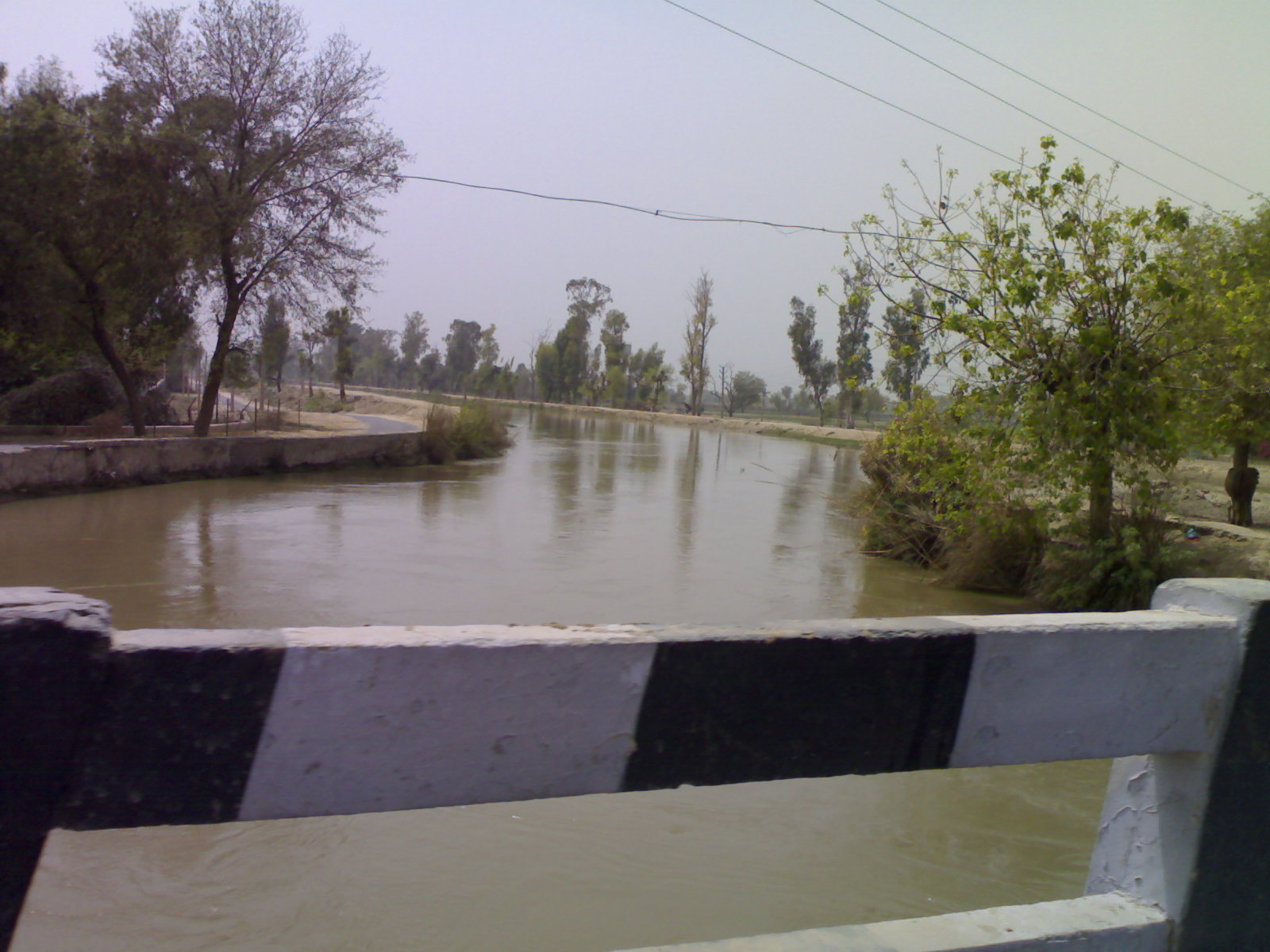
- Gang canal in northern-western area of district near Ganganagar
- Interactive map of Gang Canal (Bikaner canal)

History
- Original owner: Punjab, Bikaner State, Bahawalpur State
- Construction began: 5 December 1925
- Date of first use: 26 October 1927

Geography
- Start point: 30.9896°N 74.5538°E
- End point: 29.4939°N 73.6423°E

The Ganga Canal (also called Gang Canal) of Rajasthan is an irrigation system of canals in the present district of Sri Ganganagar fed from the Sutlej River from Ferozepur Headworks 10 km northwest of Firozpur in Punjab state, close to the India–Pakistan border, and passes through the Faridkot, Fazilka and Muktsar districts of Punjab before entering Rajasthan in Ganganagar district and ends in Hanumangarh district. It was constructed in the early twentieth century by Ganga Singh, the king of erstwhile Bikaner princely state.

== History ==
In the Indian famine of 1899–1900, the Bikaner princely state was one of the most affected areas. In 1903, the British India Government, with the aim of eliminating the problem of famine caused by water scarcity, obtained the services of A.W.E. Standley, Chief Engineer of Punjab, to conduct the feasibility study on interbasin transfer of water from Satluj river to the northwestern area (present day Sri Ganganagar and Hanumangarh districts) of the Bikaner princely state. Subsequently, Mr. R. G. Kennedy, then Chief Engineer of Punjab, prepared the technical plan for the construction, however the project was delayed due to the objection raised by the erstwhile Muslim State of Bahawalpur. Consequently, with intervention of then viceroy of India, Lord Curzon, in 1906, a tripartite conference was held and an agreement was signed on 4 September 1920 to resolve the issue. The foundation stone of the Canal Head Works at Ferozepur was laid on 5 December 1925 and the work completed in 1927 by constructing 89 miles of lined canal. The opening ceremony was performed on 26 October 1927 by Lord Irwin, the then viceroy of India. The cost of whole project was Rupees 310.97 Lakhs up to 1943. Another 60 Lakhs were spent on development of Gang Colony and railways.

During the Partition of India, Sir Cyril Radcliffe, the chairman of the Punjab Boundary Commission, initially considered awarding the Ferozpur and Zira tehsils of the Ferozpur District to Pakistan. This would have put the headwaters of the Ganga Canal in the territory of Pakistan. Bikaner's prime minister K. M. Panikkar warned the Viceroy Lord Mountbatten that the Bikaner state would have no choice but to accede the Bikaner princely state to Pakistan in the event of the headwaters going to Pakistan. Jawaharlal Nehru also wrote to the Viceroy stating that it would be "most dangerous" for the Ferozpur district to go to Pakistan for "strategic and irrigation reasons". Subsequently, Radcliffe removed the salient and awarded the entire Ferozpur district to India.

== Impact ==
The canal irrigates 303,000 hectares of land, roughly equivalent to that of the Upper Bari Doab Canal in Punjab in India. After construction of the canal, many people from south Punjab migrated to this area in Ganganagar and Hanumangarh districts, the state administration facilitated several facilities for them. With availability of water from canal, Ganganagar and Hanumangarh districts transformed into rich land and became the granary of Rajasthan.

== See also ==
- List of canals in India
  - Rajasthan
    - Narmada Canal, in Rajasthan and Gujarat
    - Ramjal Setu link project (ERCP), in Chambal river basin in eastern Rajasthan
    - Indira Gandhi Canal (Rajasthan Canal) in Indus river basin in western Rajasthan
  - Indus Water Treaty (IWT), impacts water supply in Rajasthan
- List of rivers in India
  - List of rivers of Rajasthan
  - Rivers and dams of Jammu and Kashmir
  - Rigvedic rivers
- Ministry of Jal Shakti
  - Irrigation in India
  - river interlinking project
  - List of dams and reservoirs in India
  - List of megaprojects in India
- Radcliffe Line

== Bibliography ==
- Sehgal, K.K. (1972). Rajasthan [district Gazetteers].: Ganganagar. Gazetteer of India. Printed at Government Central Press – via archive.org.
- Wolpert, Stanley (2009), Shameful Flight: The Last Years of the British Empire in India, Oxford University Press, USA, p. 167, ISBN 9780195393941
