= Ferozepur Headworks =

Barrage over Sutlej River in Punjab, India

- 30°59′29″N 74°33′6″E
- Waterway: Sutlej River
- Country: India
- County: Firozpur district, Punjab
- Maintained by: Punjab Irrigation Department
- Operation: Hydraulic
- First built: 1927

The Ferozepur Headworks (Note: "Ferozepur" is a common spelling used in the water resources literature. An older British spelling is "Ferozepore". The current spelling used in India is "Firozpur".) (also called Ferozepur Barrage and Hussainiwala Headworks) is a barrage on Sutlej River, 10 km northwest of Firozpur in Punjab, India, close to the India–Pakistan border. It was constructed in British India in 1922, and fed three canals: Dipalpur Canal in present-day Pakistani Punjab, Eastern Canal in present-day Indian Punjab and Ganga Canal that irrigates parts of Rajasthan. After the partition of India, the headworks fell in Indian Punjab, which shut off water to Dipalpur Canal during the Indo-Pakistani water dispute of 1948. Subsequently, Pakistan constructed the BRB Canal to bring waters from the Chenab River to the Sutlej basin, and connected it to the Dipalpur Canal. The allocation of waters of the Indus river system (Note: The Indus river system is deemed to consist of six rivers: Indus, Jhelum, Chenab, Ravi, Beas and Sutlej. The Beas River joins the Sutlej above the Ferozepur Headworks.) was agreed between the two countries in the Indus Waters Treaty of 1960.

== History ==
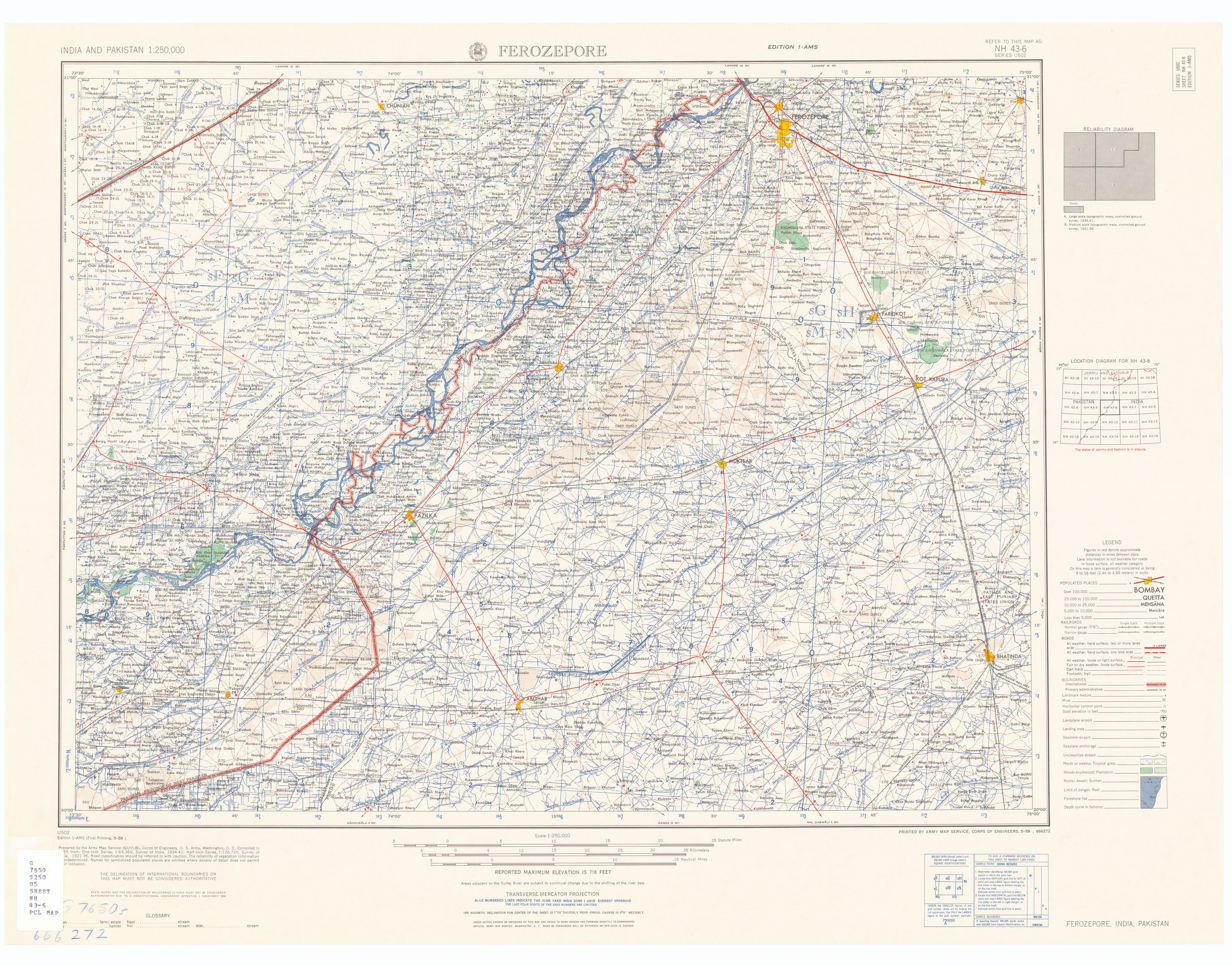
Survey map including Ferozepur (AMS, 1955)

A system of 11 inundation canals called Grey Inundation Canals of Ferozepur was developed during 1875–1876 with a total discharge of 178 m^{3}/s. Along with lower Sutlej inundation canals, they irrigated 2 million hectares on both sides of the Sutlej river.

The Sutlej Valley Project was executed in the 1920s, involving four headworks at Ferozepur, Sulemani, Hasilpur (Islam Headworks) and Panjnad. These projects utilised the earlier inundation canals to supply 1,373.8 m^{3}/s of water, irrigating 7.581 million acres (3.068 million hectares) of cultivable land, of which 4.791 million acres were in Punjab, 2.140 million acres were in the Bahawalpur state and 0.650 million acres were in the Bikaner state.

The Ferozepur barrage was constructed over Sutlej near Hussainiwala, 10 km northwest of Firozpur. It was completed in 1927. Water from it fed three canals:

- Ganga Canal (also called "Bikaner Canal"), took off from the left bank of Sutlej to irrigate 650,000 acres in the Bikaner state, mainly in the Ganganagar Division.
- Eastern Canal, also on the left bank of Sutlej, provided irrigation to 429,000 acres in Ferozepur district and a small part of north-eastern Bahawalpur state.
- Dipalpur Canal, which took off from the right bank of Sutlej, irrigated 981,000 acres in Lahore and Montgomery districts.

=== Partition and water distribution ===
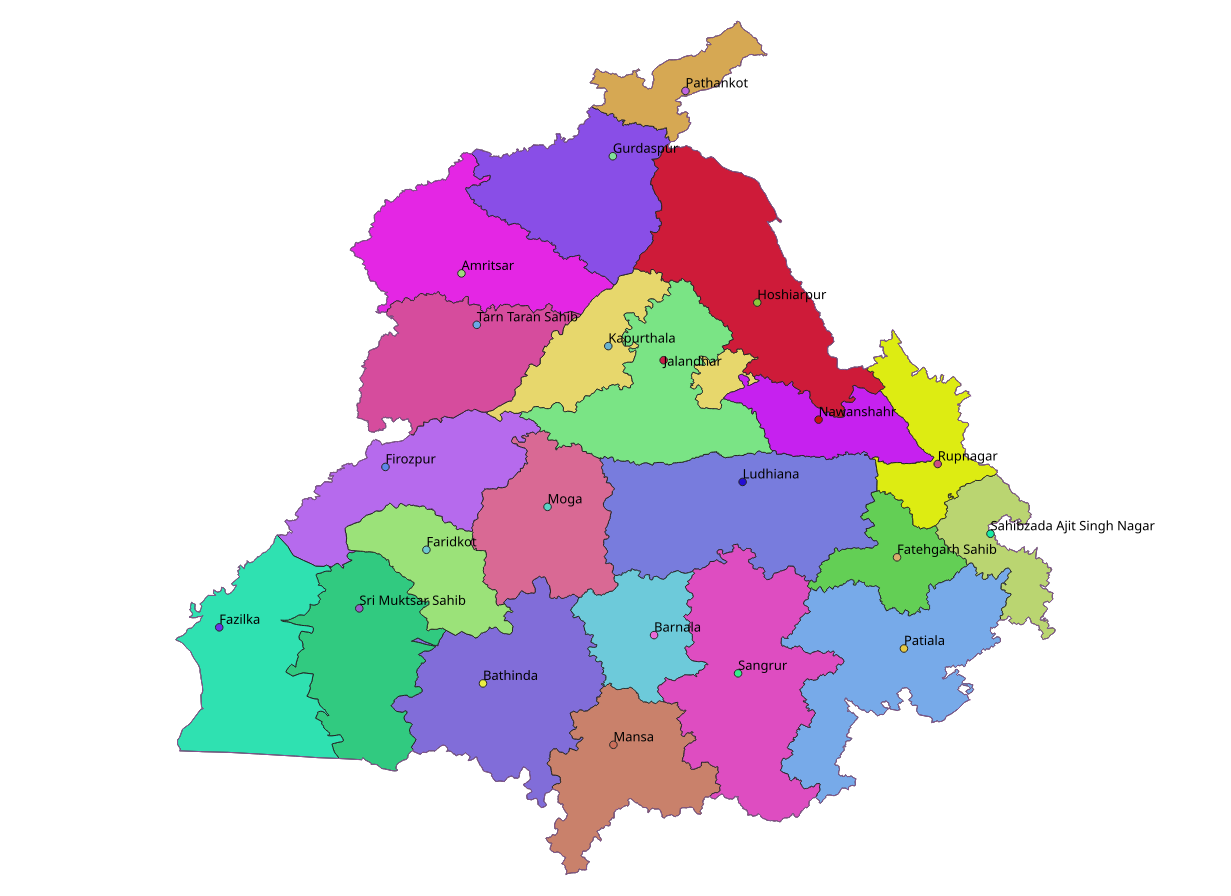
Present-day district map of Indian Punjab

During the Partition of India, Sir Cyril Radcliffe, the chairman of the Punjab Boundary Commission, placed Ferozepur district in India, and Lahore and Montgomery districts in Pakistan. He initially considered awarding the Ferozepur and Zira tehsils (which make up the present-day Firozpur district) (Note: The Ferozepore district of British India had five tehsils (sub-districts), Firozpur, Zira and Fazilka in the west, and Muktasar and Moga in the east. As of 2025, Fazilka, Muktasar and Moga have been made independent districts, with only Zira and Firozpur tehsils remaining in the rump district.) to Pakistan. This would have put the Ferozepur Headworks in the territory of Pakistan. Bikaner's prime minister K. M. Panikkar warned the Viceroy Lord Mountbatten that the Bikaner state would have no choice but to accede to Pakistan in the event of the headworks going to Pakistan. Jawaharlal Nehru also wrote to the Viceroy stating that it would be "most dangerous" for the regions to go to Pakistan for "strategic and irrigation reasons". Subsequently, Radcliffe removed the salient and awarded the entire Ferozepur district to India.

Subsequent to the partition, the chief engineers of Pakistani Punjab and Indian Punjab signed a Standstill Agreement to maintain the status quo on water distribution till 31 March 1948. After the expiry of the agreement, Indian Punjab turned off water along the canals leading to Pakistani Punjab, including the Dipalpur Canal issuing from the Ferozepur Headworks. In April 1948 the chief engineers of the two sides signed fresh Standstill Agreements to last till September–October 1948, but the government of Pakistani Punjab refused to ratify them. In May 1948, an Inter-Dominion conference was held in Delhi between Indian and Pakistani delegations, whereby it was agreed that Indian Punjab would have the rights to use the rivers flowing in its territory for developing its own areas and Pakistan would be allowed time to develop alternative sources.

After Delhi Agreement, Pakistan summoned senior irrigation engineers to respond to what it viewed as a "national emergency". A Sutlej link-channel was constructed to link an upstream portion of the Sutlej river that flowed in Pakistani territory with the Dipalpur Canal, avoiding the Ferozepur Barrage. This proved to be a fruitless effort, because India soon began to construct Harike Barrage further upstream. A more ambitious project was the Bambawali-Ravi-Bedian Canal (BRB Canal), that took off from the Upper Chenab Canal near Bambanwala, and, after crossing the Ravi River, ran south till Bedian, parallel to the border with India. It was later extended to the Dipalpur Canal as well. In this fashion, Pakistan was able to meet the water needs of the Ravi and Sutlej basins in its territory with water diverted from Chenab.

== Bibliography ==
- Chaturvedi, Mahesh Chandra (2011), India's Waters: Environment, Economy, and Development, CRC Press, ISBN 978-1-4398-7283-3
- Gilmartin, David (2020), Blood and Water: The Indus River Basin in Modern History, Univ of California Press, ISBN 978-0-520-35553-8
- Naqvi, Saiyid Ali (2012), Indus Waters and Social Change: The Evolution and Transition of Agrarian Society in Pakistan, Oxford University Press Pakistan, ISBN 978-0-19-906396-3
- Salman, Salman M. A.; Uprety, Kishor (2002), Conflict and Cooperation on South Asia's International Rivers: A Legal Perspective, World Bank Publications, ISBN 978-0-8213-5352-3
- Thatte, Chandrakant D. (2008), "Indus Waters and the 1960 Treaty Between India and Pakistan", in Olli Varis; Cecilia Tortajada; Asit K. Biswas (eds.), Management of Transboundary Rivers and Lakes, Springer Science & Business Media, ISBN 978-3-540-74928-8
- Wolpert, Stanley (2009), Shameful Flight: The Last Years of the British Empire in India, Oxford University Press, USA, p. 167, ISBN 9780195393941
