= Dharmawati River =

River in India

Location
- Country: India
- State: Bihar
- District: Kaimur, Rohtas

Physical characteristics
- Mouth: Karmanasa River
- Length: 76 km (47 mi)
- Width
  - average: 135 ft

Dharmawati is a river located in the Bihar state of India. It flows over the Districts of Rohtas and Kaimur. Its mouth is located on the Karmanasa River near to the village named Panjrawan in Kaimur.
