= Soundane Cut =

Canal in Maharashtra, India

Soundane Cut is a deep canal carrying water from Ujani Dam located on Bhima River. The cut is located near village Soundane in Mohol Taluka, Solapur District of Maharashtra State, India.

The cut is part of the Bhima Aqueduct project, and is 53 kilometers in length. It was dug in the 1970s, with completion planned for the end of that decade.
