= Bhander Plateau =

Coordinates: 24.17°N 80.3°E

Geography
- Location: Madhya Pradesh, India

The Bhander Plateau is a plateau in the state of Madhya Pradesh in India. It has an area of 10,000 square kilometres (3,900 sq mi). It links the Deccan Plateau to the south with the Indo-Gangetic Plains and the Chota Nagpur Plateau to the north and east respectively. The plateau is part of the Vindhya Range in central India.

A series of plateaus runs along the Kaimur Range. These fluvial plateaus, consists of a series of descending plateaus, starting with the Panna Plateau in the west, followed by Bhander Plateau and Rewa Plateau and ending with Rohtas Plateau in the east.
