= Kodra River =

Kodra River Kudra

Location
- Country: India
- State: Bihar
- District: Kaimur, Rohtas

Physical characteristics
- Mouth: Durgavati River
- Length: 82 km (51 mi)
- Width
  - average: 170 ft

Kodra is river located in the Bihar state of India. It is one of the tributaries of Durgavati River. Kodra River arises from Kaimur Mountains and is mouth is present at Durgavati River. The Kodra River passes through the Kaimur and Rohtas districts.
