= Karmanasa Canal =

- Location within Uttar Pradesh
- Country: India
- Coordinates: 25.3149875°N 83.6731165°E

Specifications
- Length: 58.5 km (36.4 miles)
- Maximum height AMSL: 73 m (240 ft)

History
- Construction began: 1924
- Date completed: 1930
- Date restored: 2012

Geography
- Start point: Rajpur Barrage

Karmanasa Canal is a Canal located in Kaimur District of Bihar, India. It arises from Kohira River in Chainpur tehsil and ends in Ramgarh Tehsil of Kaimur at Durgawati River. The Karmanasa Canal also have so many Minors arising from it. Its average width is 80 ft.
