= Bijawar-Panna Plateau =

- Location within India

Highest point
- Coordinates: 25°50′N 80°0′E

Geography
- Location: Madhya Pradesh, India

The Bijawar-Panna Plateau covers portions of Chhatarpur and Panna districts in the Indian state of Madhya Pradesh.

== Geography ==
Behind the Bijawar Hills in Sagar Division is the 25-30 km wide Bijawar-Panna Plateau. The Bijawar-Panna Plateau rises from the north to south in three well marked escarpments roughly followed by 300, 375 and 450 m contours, towards the longitudinal valleys of the rivers Mirhasan and Sonar. To the north-east of Panna there are two main branches – the southern is called Panna hills and the northern one Vindhyachal Range. The Panna Range merely forms a table land 15 km broad. Its general slope is from south-west to north-east.

It is part of the Bundelkhand Plateau.

A series of plateaux runs along the Kaimur Range. These fluvial plateaux, consists of a series of descending plateaux, starting with the Panna Plateau in the west, followed by Bhander Plateau and Rewa Plateau and ending with Rohtas Plateau in the east.

Crossing the Bijawar-Panna hills, the Ken River cuts a 60 km long, and 150-180 m deep gorge. Several streams join the Ken in this gorge making waterfalls.
