= Soundane =

Village in Maharashtra

- Village
- Location in Maharashtra, India Soundane (India)
- Coordinates: 17°43′09.0″N 75°34′29.50″E
- Country: India
- State: Maharashtra
- District: Solapur

Government
  - Type: Grampanchayat

Languages
  - Official: Marathi
- Time zone: UTC+5:30 (IST)
- Postal code: 413213

Soundane (also Saundane )is a small village located in western Maharashtra in India. Taluka place for the village is Mohol. Soundane is part of the Solapur District.

== Location ==
Milestone at Tambole village showing distance to Soundane

Soundane is located approximately 15 km from Mohol. Soundane can be reached from Mohol via another nearby village, Tambole. The entire road is a tar road and thus helps reach Soundane on any vehicle without limitations of travel on a rough road.

Mohol itself is located on National Highway 65 and is separated from the district place, Solapur by approximately 35 km. Mohol is also the nearest train station for Soundane.

One can also reach Soundane from Varakute, a nearby village located on Solapur - Pandharpur State Highway. This route passes via villages Kurul and Ankoli and is the alternate way to reach Soundane apart from connectivity via the Taluka place Mohol.

== Demographics ==
According to the 2001 census of India, Soundane has 526 households, with a total population of 2554, including 1297 males and 1257 females.

== Economics ==
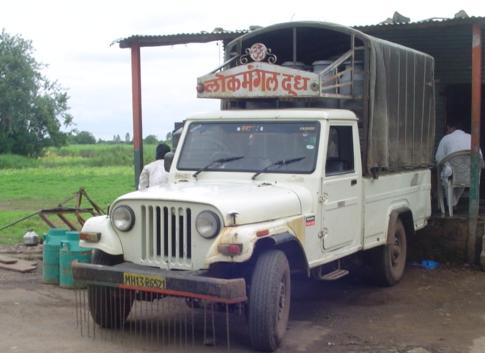
Milk carrying vehicle ready to reach the main milk processing units

Farming is the main source of income for inhabitants of Soundane village. Other sources of income include dairy products from the farm animals.

Farmers typically sell the milk from their farm animals to local dairies. Milk collected at the village collection centers owned by private dairies is then sent off for larger scale collection and distribution by the dairy owners.

Sugarcane factory in nearby village Takali also provides for employment needs of some of the villagers in Soundane.

=== Farming ===
Traditional crops include Jawar, Maize, Wheat. Since recent years, Sugarcane has been a popular farm product amongst the native farmers.

Other crops include Groundnut, Tomato farming as well as horticulture. Fruit cultivation includes Pomegranate, Lemon as well as banana.

Daily wages for farm workers can range from anywhere between Rs. 150 (US$2.40) to Rs. 250 (US$4) depending on the nature and requirement of the farming activity.

==== Farm water resources ====
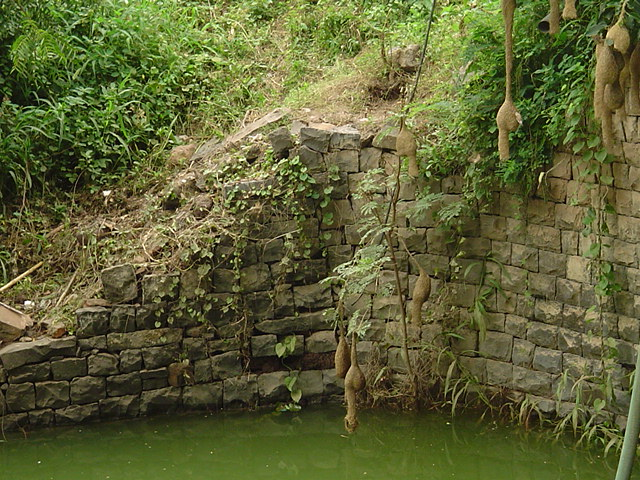
Sources of water for farming needs

Farmers rely on rain water as well as water from canal on Ujani dam for farming needs. Traditionally, farmers own wells that supply water to the farm land. At times, these wells are also supplied water via water pumps on nearby canal.

Farmers are slowly adapting advanced irrigation techniques such as drip irrigation etc. suitable for dryland farming.

Soundane has been subject of severe drought in the recent years (years 2002, 2003). During this period, farmers had to move their livestock to shared feeding facilities provided by the Government and the sugarcane factories due to food and water scarcity.

== Means of Communication ==
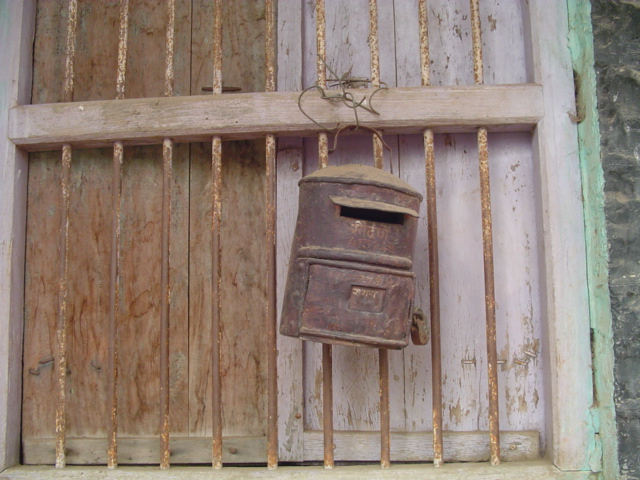
Soundane's own Letter Box

Few years ago, only way to communicate with the outside world was via mails. Letters were handed over to those who travelled frequently to the Taluka place (Mohol) so that they could drop the letters at the post office. Letters were then dispatched to the desired destinations. As the time progressed however, other means of communication such as telephone also became available to the villagers.

Near by village Tambole is the nearest official post office (Pin code 413213) for villagers in Soundane. Soundane itself also has a small letter box where letters can be dropped. Letters are collected periodically by the postman and taken to the main Post office from where they are then dispatched to the desired destinations.

== Educational Facilities ==
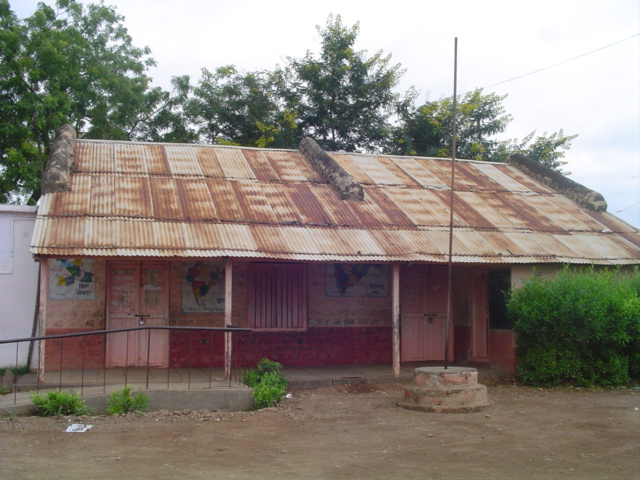
School for Kids in the village

Soundane has its own school for primary education. Medium of instruction in the school is Marathi. School offers education up to the 7th standard for the students.

As seen in the image, school building a single storied house like structure constructed out of stone wall and iron sheet roof. School is located right in the heart of village and is made of two separate premises. Both premises look quite similar and are located near to each other, one of the premises being older than the other one.

There is no facility however for college education in the village. Village students have to reach out to other bigger towns such as Mohol to get a college education.

== Villages in Vicinity ==
Villages bordering Soundane include Tambole, Adegao, Varakute, and Takali Sikandar.

Other large sized villages in the nearby vicinity of Soundane include Patkul and Penur.
