= Gaangi River =

Location
- Country: India
- State: Uttar Pradesh
- District: Jaunpur, Ghazipur

Physical characteristics
- Mouth: Ganges
  - coordinates: 25°31′15″N 83°31′40″E
- Length: 76 km (47 mi)
- Width
  - average: 410 ft

Gaangi also known as Gangi is a small river in Uttar Pradesh, India. The river rises from Gomti river almost 4 km away from the town of Kerakat and flows through the Districts of Jaunpur and side of Azamgarh, and finally opens at Mainpur village located in the Karanda block of Ghazipur District.
