= Deokali Canal =

Canal in Uttar Pradesh, India

- Country: India

Specifications
- Length: 90 km (56 miles)
- Locks: One
- Maximum height AMSL: 74 m (243 ft)

History
- Construction began: 1974
- Date completed: 1978

Geography
- Start point: Dokali Barrage

Deokali Canal is one of the largest canals located in Ghazipur district of Uttar Pradesh, India. The canal is almost 90 km (56 mi) long. It has an average width of 40 m (132 ft). The cost of making the canal was 2.9 carore in 1978.
