= Durgavati River =

Durgavati River Durgaoti River, Durgawati River,
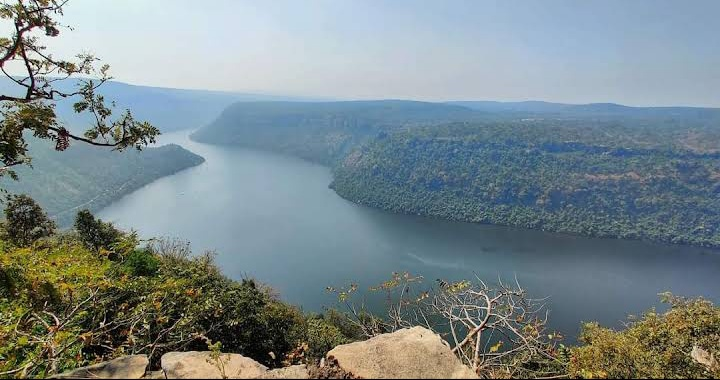

Location
- Country: India
- State: Bihar
- District: Kaimur, Rohtas

Physical characteristics
- Mouth: Karmanasa River
  - coordinates: 25°21′57″N 83°40′52″E
- Length: 165 km (103 mi)
- Width
  - average: 222 ft

The Durgavati River, ( 𑂠𑂳𑂩𑂹𑂏𑂰𑂫𑂞𑂲 𑂢𑂠𑂹𑂠𑂲 ) (also called Durgaoti or Durgauti and spelt as Durgawati) which flows through Kaimur district in the Indian state of Bihar, is a tributary of the Karmanasa.

== Course ==
The source of the Durgavati is about 11 kilometres (7 mi) east of that of the Karmanasa. In its upper reaches it is a rocky channel 6 to 9 metres (20 to 30 ft) wide. It runs nearly north for about 14 kilometres (9 mi) when it plunges down the rocky boundary of the table land in to the head of deep glen named Kadhar Kho. There it is joined by three other torrents that like itself rise on the table land of the Turkan Kharawars and fall down the rocks at the head of the same glen. These three torrents are the Lohara, Hatiyadub and Kothas. The Durgavati joins the Karmanasa as a right bank tributary.

== Waterfalls ==
The Durgavati Falls, 80 metres (260 ft) high, on the Durgavati River is at the edge of the Rohtas Plateau.

== Durgavati Reservoir ==
The Durgavati Reservoir, also known as Karamchat Dam, is a water storage Dam located near Karamchat village in Kaimur district. The foundation stone for the project was laid in 1976 by Jagjivan Ram, who was a Union minister at the time. It can be reached via Sasaram to Kudra-Chenari-Malahipur road.

== See also ==
- Dharmawati River
- Durgavati Canal
- Chausa Canal
