= Chakia =

Chakia may refer to:

- Chakia, Bihar, a town and a subdivision in East Champaran district of Bihar, India
  - Chakia railway station
- Chakia, Uttar Pradesh, a town and a tehsil in Chandauli district of Uttar Pradesh, India
  - Chakia Assembly constituency
