= Awazapur =

Coordinates: 25°24′N 83°19′E

Awazapur Awajapur
- Village
- Interactive map of Awazapur
- Country: India
- State: Uttar Pradesh
- District: Chandauli

Population (2011)
  - Total: 3,426

Awazapur (Awajapur) is a village panchayat in Chandauli district of Uttar Pradesh, India. It is located 40 km away from Varanasi, and 20 km from Chandauli. The population of the village is above 7000 in this time. In Awazapur, a large number of people are in army, Teacher and defense services. The village has a post office. There are two canals in the village, north and south of the village. The village also has a college named Shahid Captain Vijay Pratap Singh Mahavidyalaya, Amar sahid vidya mandir Inter college, Amar sahid balika inter college and Petrol Pump, KGSG Bank .

It falls under the Chandauli (Loksabha) Parliamentary Constituency and Shaiyadraza Legislative Assembly, and under the Sakaldiha Tehsil, Dhanapur Block and Dhanapur Police Station.
