= Banshipur =

Village in Chandauli District, India

Banshipur बंशीपुर
- Village
- Location within Uttar Pradesh
- Coordinates: 25.3949984°N 83.2306027°E
- Country: India
- State: Uttar Pradesh
- District: Chandauli
- Block: Chahaniya
- Tehsil: Sakaldiha
- Panchayat: Vishunpura
- Elevation: 77 m (253 ft)
- ZIP Code: 232109
- STD Code: 05495

Banshipur is a village in Chandauli District in the Indian state of Uttar Pradesh. It comes under Vishunpura panchayat, Block Chahaniya. The nearest Railway station is Sakaldiha, and the nearest metro city is Varanasi. The village is approximately 8 km from the river Ganga.

== Related information ==
The nearest bank of River Ganga is known as Baluan Ghat.

== Transportation ==
Village Banshipur is approximately 1 km east from Chandauli-Saidpur Highway. Sakaldiha is approx 7 km and Saidpur is approx 10 km. Deen Dayal Upadhyay Railway Junction is approx 15 km from Banshipur.
