= Mughalsarai Railway Settlement =

- Town
- Location in Uttar Pradesh, India Mughalsarai Railway Settlement (India)
- Coordinates: 25°17′N 83°06′E
- Country: India
- State: Uttar Pradesh
- District: Chandauli

Population (2011)
  - Total: 20,441

Language
  - Official: Hindi
  - Additional official: Urdu
- Time zone: UTC+5:30 (IST)
- Vehicle registration: UP
- Website: up.gov.in

Mughalsarai Railway Settlement is a town in Chandauli District in the Indian state of Uttar Pradesh.

== Demographics ==
As of 2011 Indian Census, Mughalsarai Railway Settlement (ITS) had a total population of 20,441, of which 11,090 were males and 9,351 were females. Population within the age group of 0 to 6 years was 1,498. The total number of literates in Mughalsarai Railway Settlement was 17,577, which constituted 86.0% of the population with male literacy of 89.8% and female literacy of 81.5%. The effective literacy rate of 7+ population of Mughalsarai Railway Settlement was 92.8%, of which male literacy rate was 97.4% and female literacy rate was 87.4%. The Scheduled Castes and Scheduled Tribes population was 3,347 and 598 respectively. Mughalsarai Railway Settlement had 4111 households in 2011.

== See also ==
- Mughalsarai
