= Azadari Dhapri =

Village in Chandauli, Uttar Pradesh, India

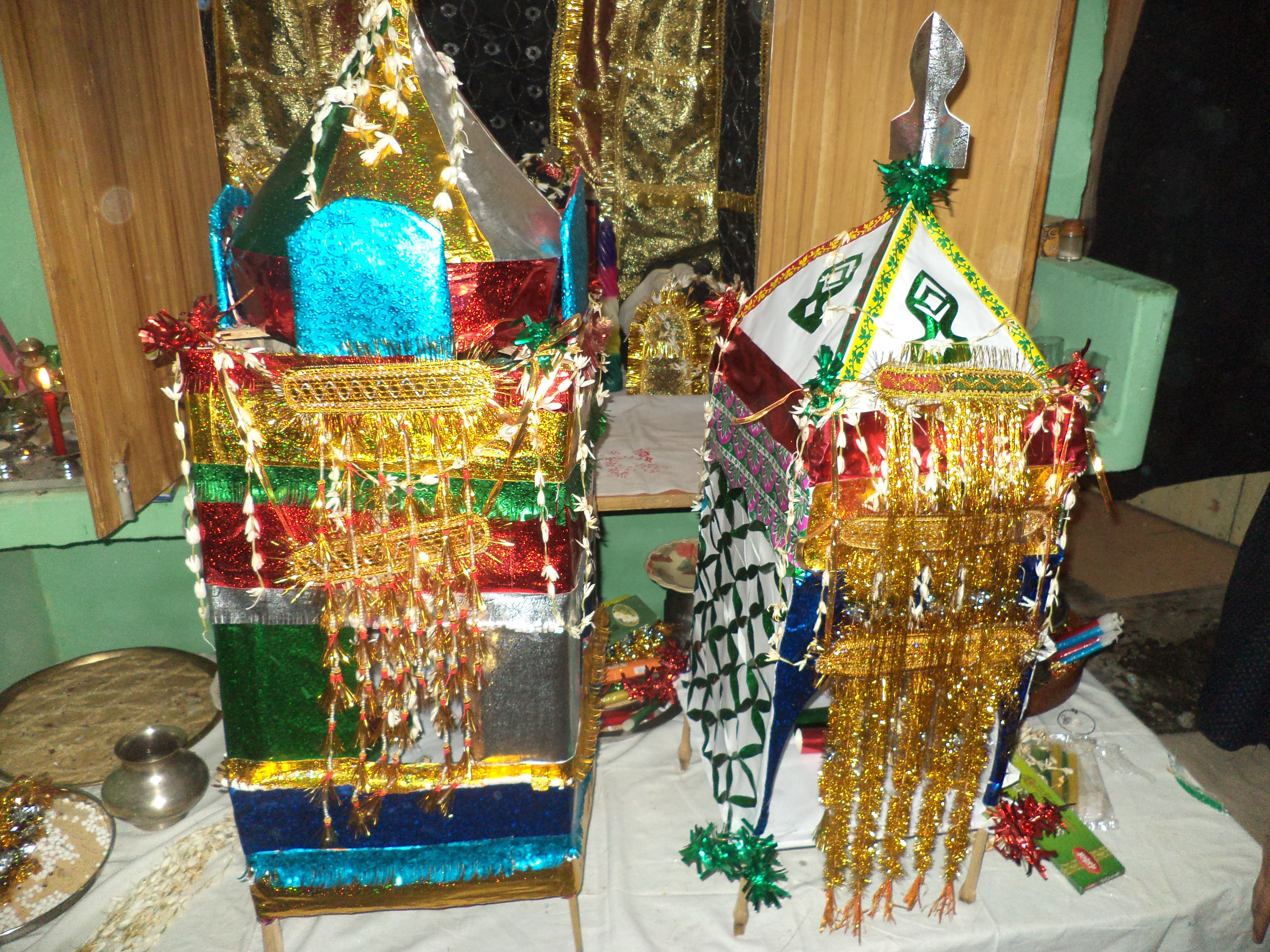
Qasim 7th Muharram In Dhapri Azadari

Azadari Dhapri is a small village in the Chandauli district of Uttar Pradesh state of India. Its nearest city is Mughalsarai.

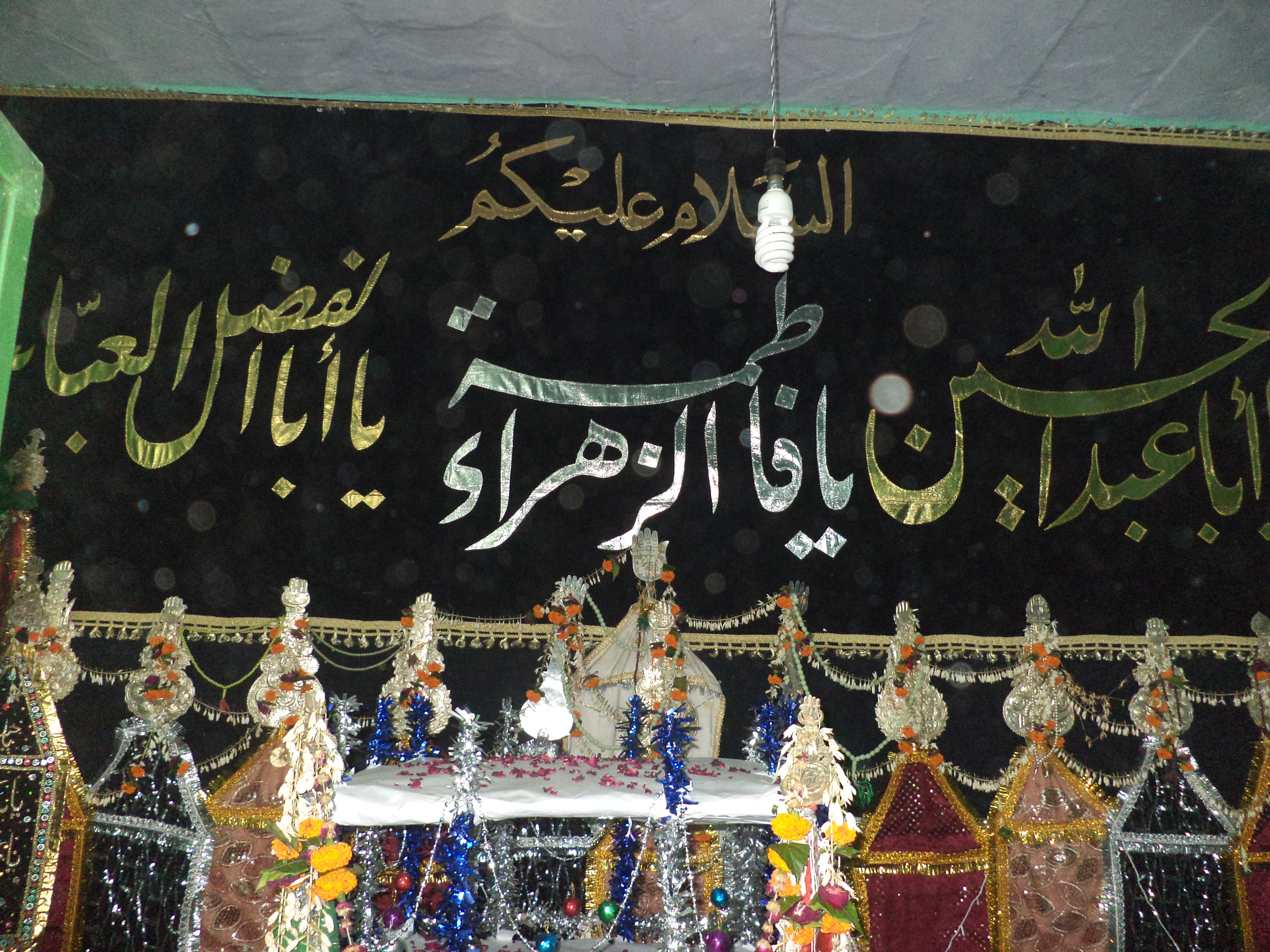
Azakhana e imam e hussain dhapri chandauli

== History ==
Azadari in Dhapri was created in 1700. Dhapri is well known for their Muharram Imam Hussain troops who fought the Battle of Karbala in Iraq

== Transportation ==
The primary means of transportation are taxis, buses, and local rickshaws. Taxis are available at any time of the day, and the nearest bus station is Pachferwa. Dhapri is well connected by roads and rail to surrounding large cities, such as Mughalsarai and Varanasi. The Mughalsarai Railway Station is on the Allahabad–Kanpur route. Mail or express trains often stop at the Mughalsarai Railway Station. The preferred method of transport in Dhapri is by road, with the national highway connecting Dhapri to Kolkata and Kanpur.

=== Road ===
Mughal Sarai is on National Highway No. 2, which is known as Grand Trunk Road made by the Emperor Sher Shah Suri. Sher Shah Suri had named this road as Sadak-e-Azam. In ancient times this road was known as Uttarapath. Jarasandh adopted this very route to attack Mathura under the Kingship of Lord Krishna. Mughalsarai is located 667 kilometres (414 mi) far from Kolkata by road.
