= Hingutargarh =

Hingutargarh is a village in Chandauli district, Uttar Pradesh, India.
