= Bhardua =

Coordinates: 26.9766351095°N 83.183446103°E

Bhardua is a village in Chandauli, Uttar Pradesh, India.
