= Madhupur, Sonbhadra =

Madhupur
- Census town
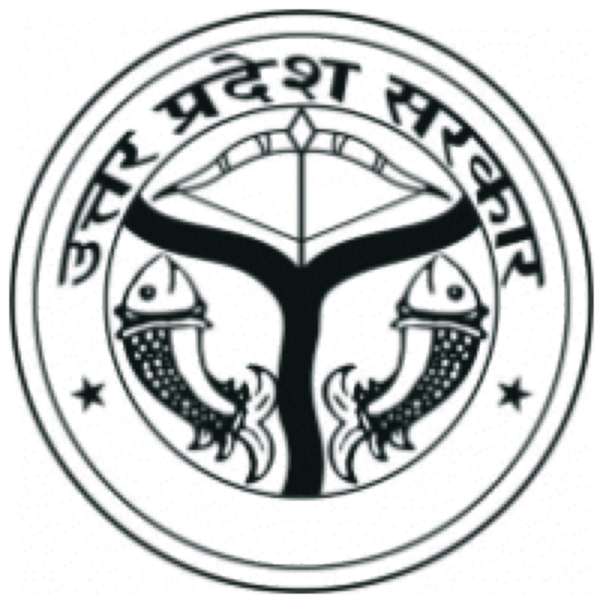

- Location in Madhupur sonebhadra, Uttar Pradesh, India Madhupur (India)
- Coordinates: 24.7°N 83.02°E
- Country: India
- State: Uttar Pradesh
- District: Sonbhadra
- Elevation: 301 m (988 ft)

Population (2011)
  - Total: 22,097

Languages
  - Official: Hindi, bhojpuri
- Time zone: UTC+5:30 (IST)
- PIN: 231216
- Telephone code: +91 5444
- Vehicle registration: UP 64

Madhupur is a census town in Sonbhadra district in the Indian state of Uttar Pradesh. It is located 17 km from Robertsganj which is the administrative headquarters of Sonbhadra District. The district Sonbhadra was created by carving off the southern part of the earlier Mirzapur district on 4 March 1989. Son, Karmnasha, Chandra Prabha, Rihand, Kanhar, Renu, Ghagar and Belan Rivers drain this area. in which Son River in main.

== About Madhupur ==
Madhupur is a census town in Robertsganj Tehsil in sonbhadra District of Uttar Pradesh States, India. It belongs to Mirzapur Division. It is located 19 km towards North from District headquarters Robertsganj, 340 km from State capital Lucknow, 66 km from Varanasi.

Madhupur Pin code is 231216 and postal head office is Robertsganj. Lohra (5 km) Bahura (5 km), Kuarava (6 km), Bhatulia (7 km), Kamahar Dih (7 KM), Jaderua (8 km), Khoradih (16 km), Rajghar (20 km), are the nearby Villages to Madhupur. Madhupur is surrounded by Robertsganj Tehsil towards South, Rajgarh Tehsil towards west, Chakiya Tehsil towards North, Ghorawal Tehsil towards west. Robertsganj, Shahganj, Kota, Obra are the nearby Cities to Madhupur. This Place is in the border of the Sonbhadra District and Chandauli District. Naugarh in Chandauli District is in East of Madhupur, Sonbhadra.

== Transport ==
Distance of Madhupur to Robertsganj is 19 km which is nearest Railway Station and Madhupur is located about 66 km from the city of Varanasi cantonment area, 95 km from Lal Bahadur Shastri International Airport in Varanasi which is also the nearest airport. Madhupur is well connected to Lucknow, Allahabad, Varanasi and Mirzapur by road. Buses are available 24x7 from Varanasi and it normally takes 2 hours to cover the distance. Nearest railway station from Madhupur is Robertsganj which connects it to Delhi, Allahabad, Ranchi and Patna. Some notable trains passing through the town are Muri express (Jammu Tawi - Delhi - Tata Nagar), Jharkhand Swarna Jayanti Express /12873(Hatia - Kanpur - Delhi) and Triveni Express (Bareilly - Lucknow - Shaktinagar), Intercity Express (Singrauli - Varanasi).

The highway connecting Varanasi and Waidhan passes through the village. Though this is national highway it is a very busy road because of the towns Renukot, Anpara, Shaktinagar which are sufficiently commercialized areas. National Thermal Power corporation is in Shaktinagar, Uttar Pradesh |Shaktinagar and also National Coalfield different projects like Singrauli, khadia, Jayant, Dudhichua, amlori, Kakri etc. These areas have several major coal mines which cater a big part of the coal need of the state. Churk a nearby town is situated around 29 km, where Jaypee group is establishing a Thermal power project. One of the main reasons this road is always busy is due to daily transport of around 1000 trucks of grits and sand.

== Demographics ==
Religions in MADHUPUR
Religion	Percent
Hindus	95%
Muslims	3%
Jains	1.4%
Others†	0.6%
Distribution of religions †Includes Sikhs (0.2%), Buddhists (<0.2%).
