= Sharada Prasad =

Indian politician

Sharda Prasad

Member, Legislative Assembly of Uttar Pradesh
- In office 2017–2022
- Succeeded by: Kailash Kharwar
- Constituency: Chakia, Chandauli

Personal details
- Party: Bharatiya Janata Party
- Occupation: MLA
- Profession: Politician

Sharda Prasad is an Indian politician and a member of 17th Legislative Assembly of Uttar Pradesh. He represents the Chakia constituency and is a member of the Bharatiya Janata Party.

== Political career ==
Prasad won his seat in the 2017 Uttar Pradesh Legislative Assembly elections by defeating Jitendra Kumar of the Bahujan Samaj Party with a margin of 20,063 votes.

== Posts held ==
From	To	Position	Comments
March 2017	Incumbent	Member, 17th Legislative Assembly	
