= Bhoojwa =

Bhoojwa is a village in Chandauli, Uttar Pradesh, India.
