= Kedarnath Singh =

Indian writer

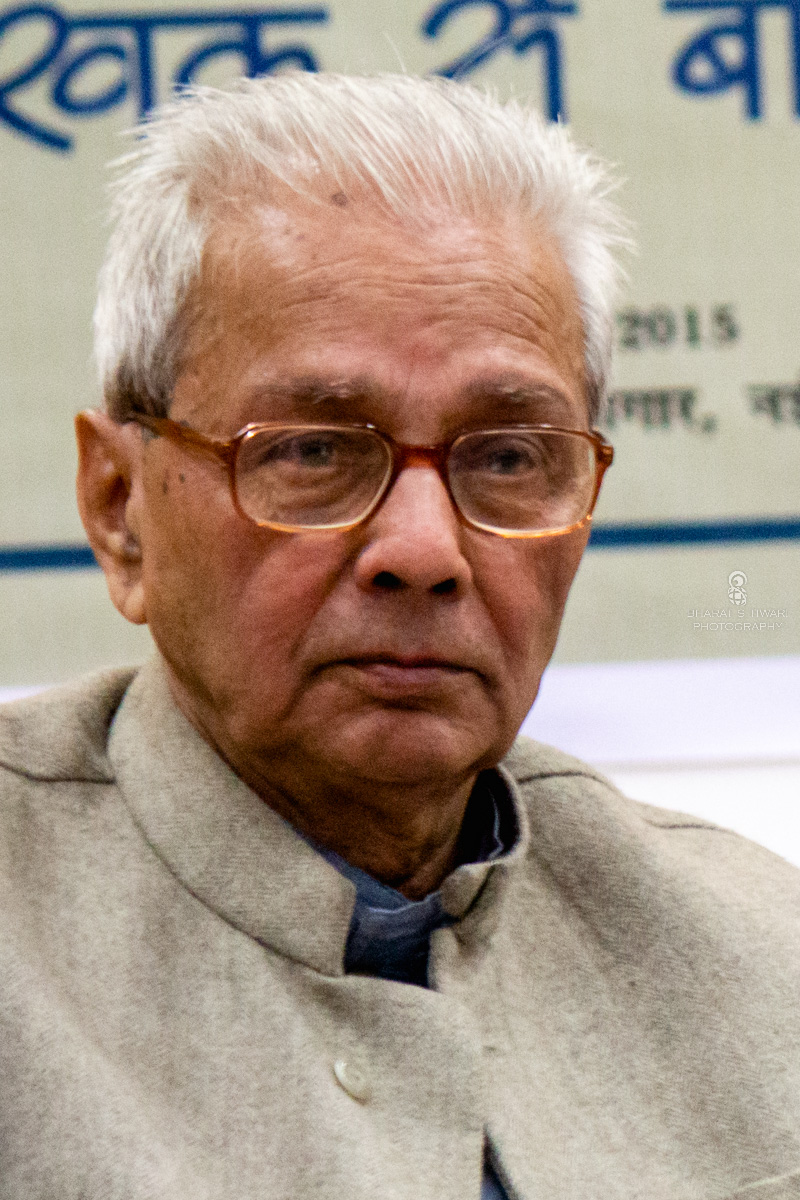
- Kedarnath Singh
- Born: 7 July 1934; Chakia, Benares State, British India
- Died: 19 March 2018 (aged 83); New Delhi, India
- Occupation: Poet
- Writing career
- Notable awards: Sahitya Akademi Award (1989); Jnanpith Award (2013)

Kedarnath Singh (7 July 1934 – 19 March 2018) was an Indian poet who wrote in Hindi. He was also an eminent critic and essayist. He was awarded the Jnanpith Award (2013), Sahitya Akademi Award (1989) in Hindi for his poetry collection, Akaal Mein Saras (Cranes in Drought).

== Early life and education ==
He was born on 7 July 1934 in village Chakia of (Bairia) Ballia District in Eastern Uttar Pradesh in Gautam Rajput family. He completed his graduation from Udai Pratap College, Varanasi. He passed M.A. from Kashi Hindu Vishwavidyalaya and did his Ph.D. from the same university. In Gorakhpur, he spent some time as a Hindi Teacher and went to Jawaharlal Nehru University, where he served as a professor and the head of department of Hindi Language in Indian Languages Center and retired as a professor from Jawaharlal Nehru University, New Delhi. He lived in New Delhi.

== Poetic style ==
Kedar Nath Singh's poetry is characterized by simple, everyday language and images that string together to convey complex themes. One of his major poems is Bagh, a long poem with the tiger as its central character. Published in the mid 1980s, the poem remains one of the most widely read long poems in Hindi literature and is included in many university curricula. At some level, Bagh bears a striking resemblance to Ted Hughes' Crow, but the two remain independent in their treatment and scope. “He was a poet of both presence and absence, of love and loss, of anxieties and questions...," said culture critic and poet Ashok Vajpayee.(5)

== Major works ==
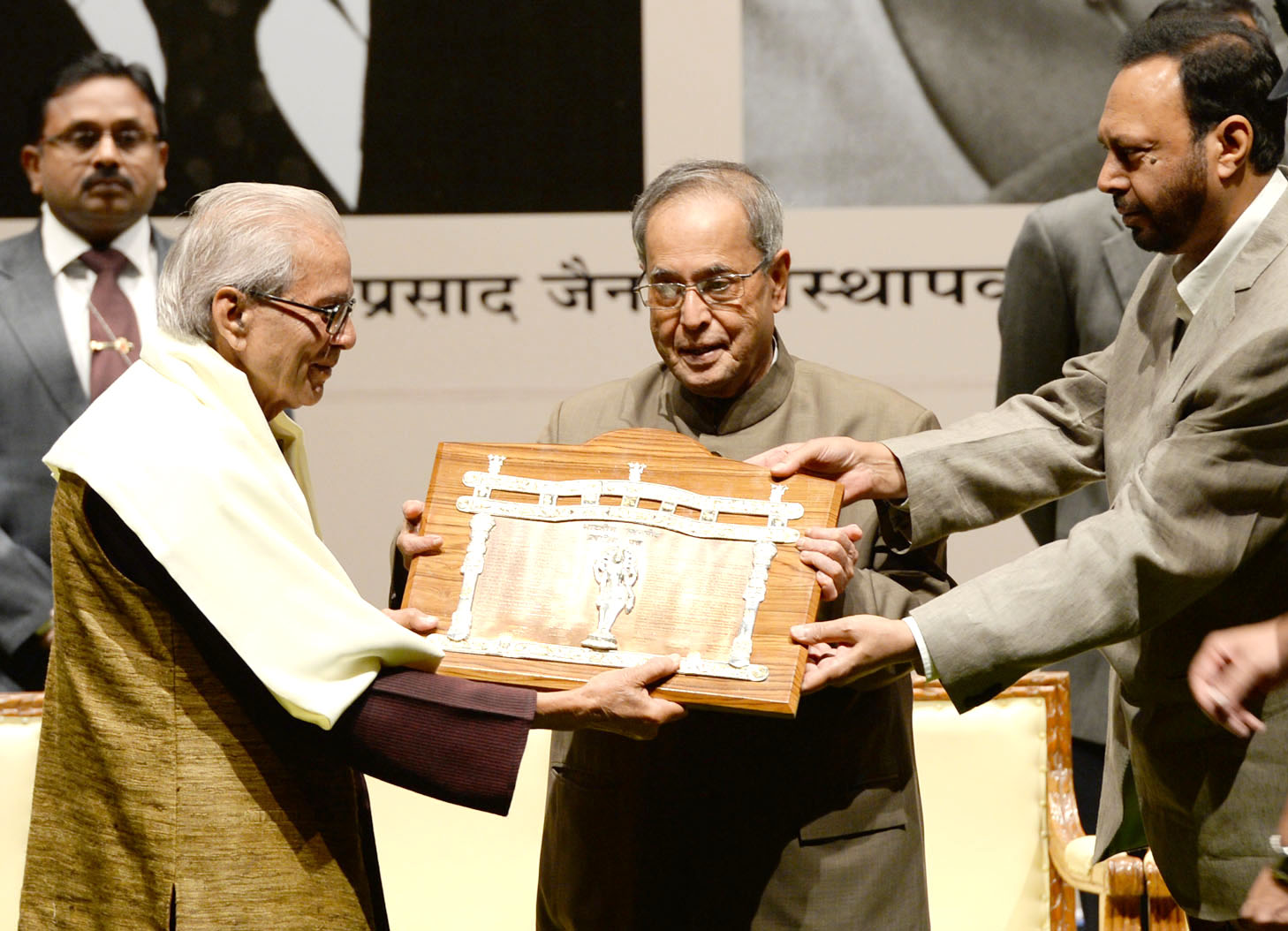
The President of India, Shri Pranab Mukherjee presenting the 49th Jnanpith Award to Shri Kedarnath Singh, at a function, in New Delhi on November 10, 2014

- Poem Collection: Abhi Bilkul Abhi, Zameen pak Rahi Hai, Yahan se Dekho, Akaal mein Saaras, Baagh, Tolstoy aur cycle
- Essay and Stories: Mere Samay ke Shabd, Kalpana aur chhayavad, Hindi kavita mein bimb vidhan, Kabristan mein Panchayat
- Others: Taana Baana

== Awards and honours ==
He received the Jnanpith award in 2013. He also received Sahitya Akademi award in 1989, the Kumaran Aashan, and the Vyas Samman (1997).

== Death ==
He died on 19 March 2018 at the All India Institute of Medical Sciences (AIIMS) in New Delhi at the age of 83. He had been admitted to the hospital after complaining of stomach pain.

== See also ==
- List of Indian writers
