= Sadhana Singh (politician) =

Indian politician (born 1974)

Member of Parliament, Rajya Sabha
- Incumbent
- Assumed office 3 April 2024
- Preceded by: Harnath Singh Yadav
- Constituency: Uttar Pradesh

Member of Uttar Pradesh Legislative Assembly
- In office 2017–2022
- Preceded by: Babban
- Succeeded by: Ramesh Jaiswal
- Constituency: Mughalsarai

Personal details
- Born: 17 August 1974 (age 52) Chandauli, Uttar Pradesh, India
- Party: Bharatiya Janata Party
- Spouse: Chhabinath (m. 1989)
- Children: 3
- Education: Sampurnanand Saraswati University
- Occupation: Agriculturist; politician

Sadhana Singh (born 17 August 1974) is an Indian politician serving as an MP in Rajya Sabha and a former member of the Uttar Pradesh Legislative Assembly, where she represented the Mughalsarai constituency in Chandauli district.

== Political career ==
Sadhana Singh contested the 2017 Uttar Pradesh Legislative Assembly election as a Bharatiya Janata Party candidate and defeated her close contestant Babulal from Samajwadi Party with a margin of 13,243 votes.

She started her political career from BJP in 1993, after that she worked on many posts within the party. She became President of Mahila Morcha Chandauli twice. She also became Member of BJP UP Working Committee thrice.

She was an MLA from Mughalsarai (Deendayal Upadhyay Nagar) from 2017 to 2022. She is also the president of Jila Udyog Vyapar Mandal, Chandauli.

== Posts held ==
Position
Member of 17th Uttar Pradesh Legislative Assembly
Member of Parliament, Rajya Sabha

== See also ==
- Uttar Pradesh Legislative Assembly
