= Majhagai =

Village in Chandauli, Uttar Pradesh, Indi

Majhagai is a village in Chandauli, Uttar Pradesh, India.
