= Khakhar =

Khakhar is an Indian name. It may refer to:

- Bhupen Khakhar (1934–2003), Indian artist
- Devang Vipin Khakhar (born 1959), Indian chemical engineer
- Piyush Khakhar (born 1965), Indian cricketer
- Sameer Khakhar, Indian actor

== See also ==
- Khakhara, Uttar Pradesh, India
- Khakkhara. a staff traditionally carried by Buddhist monks
- Kharkhari, Dhanbad, Jharkhand, India
