= Gaddochak =

- Village
- Location within India
- Coordinates: 25°28′41″N 83°16′27″E
- Country: India
- State: Uttar Pradesh
- District: Chandauli district

Area
  - Total: 93.7 ha (232 acres)
- Elevation: 180 m (600 ft)

Population (2011)
  - Total: 381
- Time zone: UTC+5:30 (IST)
- Postal Index Number: 232107

Gaddochak (गद्दोचक) is a village in the Chandauli district of Uttar Pradesh, India.
