= Uttarakhand red rice =

Type of non-Basmati aromatic rice from Uttarakhand, India

Uttarakhand lal chawal (red rice) - उत्तराखंड लाल चावल
- Geographical indication
- Alternative names: Garhwali red rice, Lal Chawal
- Description: Uttarakhand lal chawal (red rice) is an aromatic rice cultivated in Uttarakhand
- Type: Aromatic rice
- Area: Uttarakhand
- Country: India
- Registered: 8 November 2023
- Official website: ipindia.gov.in

Uttarakhand lal chawal (red rice) is a variety of non-Basmati, aromatic, red colored rice mainly grown in the Indian state of Uttarakhand. This rice variety is grown in the high-altitude regions of Uttarakhand. It is a common and widely cultivated crop in Purola, Mori, and surrounding areas in Uttarkashi district.

Under its Geographical Indication tag, it is referred to as "Uttarakhand Lal Chawal (Red Rice)".

== Name ==
Uttarakhand lal chawal is a prized crop in Uttarakhand and so named after it. The word "laal" means red (referring to its color) and "chawal" means rice in the state language of Hindi.

=== Local name ===
It is known locally as Ghadwali red rice, or simply as Laal Chawal.

== Description ==
Uttarakhand Lal Chawal (Red Rice) from the Himalayas is distinct in taste, texture, color, aroma, and flavor. This uniqueness is attributed to the heavy rainfall in the high-altitude regions and organic cultivation methods. These conditions nourish the rice, resulting in a firm texture, nutty flavor, and distinct aroma.

Some of the characteristics of this rice are:

=== Nutritional and health benefits ===
- It offers numerous nutritional and health benefits, being rich in fiber, minerals, antioxidants, Vitamin B1, and Vitamin E, with 10 times more antioxidants than regular rice, and is also a good source of iron. Its health benefits include fighting cholesterol due to the presence of 'monacolin K', aiding in weight management by providing energy and facilitating faster food breakdown, and supporting digestive health through its dietary fiber, which helps eliminate toxins and supports nutrient absorption.

=== Culinary uses ===
- It is used to make milk 'Kheer' and Jeera rice.

== Geographical indication ==
It was awarded the Geographical Indication (GI) status tag from the Geographical Indications Registry, under the Union Government of India, on 8 November 2023.

Bhagirathi Annapurna Sabji Utpadak Swayat Sahakarita from Uttarkashi, proposed the GI registration of Uttarakhand Lal Chawal (Red Rice). After filing the application in March 2022, the rice was granted the GI tag in 2023 by the Geographical Indications Registry in Chennai, making the name "Uttarakhand Lal Chawal (Red Rice)" exclusive to the rice grown in the region. It thus became the first rice variety from Uttarakhand and the 14th type of goods from Uttarakhand to earn the GI tag.

The GI tag protects the rice from illegal selling and marketing, and gives it legal protection and a unique identity.

== See also ==
- Mushqbudji rice
- Adamchini Chawal
