= Tribhuvan Narain Singh =

Indian politician

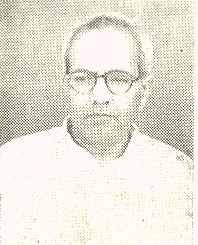

Governor of West Bengal
- In office 6 November 1979 – 12 September 1981
- Chief Minister: Jyoti Basu
- Preceded by: Anthony Lancelot Dias
- Succeeded by: Bhairab Dutt Pande

6th Chief Minister of Uttar Pradesh
- In office 18 October 1970 – 3 April 1971
- Preceded by: Charan Singh
- Succeeded by: Kamalapati Tripathi

Minister of Industry
- In office 30 October 1964 – 24 January 1966
- Prime Minister: Lal Bahadur Shastri; Gulzarilal Nanda (interim)
- Preceded by: H. C. Dasappa
- Succeeded by: Damodaram Sanjivayya

Member of the Indian Parliament for Chandauli
- In office 1952–1962
- Preceded by: Constituency Established
- Succeeded by: Bal Krishna Singh

Personal details
- Born: 8 August 1904 Benares, Benares State, British India (Now Varanasi, Uttar Pradesh)
- Died: 3 August 1982 (aged 77) Varanasi, Uttar Pradesh, India
- Party: Indian National Congress (Organisation)
- Education: Harish Chandra Postgraduate College, Kashi Vidyapith

Tribhuvan Narain Singh (8 August 1904 – 3 August 1982) was an Indian politician and Chief Minister of Uttar Pradesh. He remained Chief Minister from 18 October 1970 till 4 April 1971. Singh later served as Governor of West Bengal from the late 1970s until 1981. He was born and died in Varanasi, Uttar Pradesh. He also served as the Chairman of the Public Accounts Committee and as Union Minister of Industry and Steel.

== Early life ==
Tribhuan Narayan Singh was the son of Shri Prasidh Narayan Singh. He was born at Banaras in 1905. He completed his schooling from Harish Chandra Postgraduate College and Kashi Vidyapith Banaras. In the year 1926, he worked as a reporter and sub-editor in the Indian Daily Telegraph which was an English daily published from Lucknow. After this he worked as a teacher of economics in Mahatma Gandhi Kashi Vidyapith, Banaras from 1927 to 1928. He also worked as a sub-editor and sub-editor-in-charge at The Hindustan Times of Delhi from 1928 to 1929.

After this he worked as an assistant editor, manager and general manager, National Herald of Lucknow. He also worked as the managing partner of Janata Press and secretary, the Textile Labour Mills Union, Delhi.

== Chief Ministership ==
In October 1970, Sanyukta Vikas Dal was formed by Organization Congress, Jan Sangh and Swatantra Party and Bharatiya Kranti Dal, thus gaining majority in Uttar Pradesh house Assembly. They selected T. N. Singh of Congress (O) to be their leader and thus he became Chief Minister of Uttar Pradesh. He was Chief Minister of Uttar Pradesh from October 1970 to April 1971. One case, namely Har Sharan Verma vs Tribhuvan Narain Singh was decided by a constitutional bench of the Supreme Court in 1971. In that case, the petitioner challenged the appointment of T N Singh as chief minister of UP as at the time of his appointment he was not a member of the legislature of UP. The petitioner contended that Art. 164(4) should be confined to a case where a minister who is a member of the legislature of the state loses his seat. The idea behind Art. 164(4), he argued, was to give him a period of six months to get himself re-elected. He further contended that Art. 164(4) applied only to a minister and not to the chief minister. The constitutional bench of the Supreme Court, after referring to the constituent assembly debates, English practices and to similar provisions in the Australian constitution and South African constitution of 1909, concluded that Art. 164(4) allows a person to be appointed chief minister, who at the time of such appointment is not a member of the legislature of the state concerned. Tribhuvan Narain Singh hence, became the first Chief Minister to be appointed without being a member of either house of the state legislature. Ram Prakash Gupta is only the second person to become chief minister of Uttar Pradesh after Tribhuvan Narain Singh (in October 1970) without being a member of either house of the state legislature. He had to resign from the post of Chief Minister when he lost the bypolls from where he contested, thus bringing his short tenure to an end. He is first Indian chief minister who lost in by poll. After him Shibu Soren of Jharkhand is only the cm who lost in bye-elections.

He also served as the Chairman of the Public Accounts Committee and as Union Minister of Industry and Steel. Singh later served as Governor of West Bengal from the 1979 to 1981.

=== Positions held ===
Tribhuvan Narain Singh worked in Tehsil and District Congress Committee, Banaras.

He also worked as a Member of Provincial and Town Congress Committees, Lucknow from 1932 to 1945. Suffered imprisonment for participating in Congress movements, 1930–31, 1932 and 1942.

1. Member of Provisional Parliament,-1950-52;

2. Secretary, Congress Party in Parliament, 1951

3. Member, First Lok Sabha 1952–57;

4. Member of the Press Commission

5. Chairman Public Accounts Committee.

Tribhuvan Narain Singh was a member of the planning commission for drafting of the Third Five Year Plan.

== Political life ==
Tribhuvan Narayan Singh was elected as member of parliament from Chandauli Lok Sabha constituency in 1952 & 1957. In second general elections held in 1957 famous socialist leader Ram Manohar Lohia contested against him as an Independent candidate but could not succeed.

Voting result at that Election was:

Total Electorate : 3,94,345

Voted for T. N. Singh : 1,34,488

Voted for Ram Manohar Lohia : 97,911

== See also ==
- Chief Minister of Uttar Pradesh
- Governor of West Bengal

Political offices
Preceded by President's Rule; Administered by the Governor of Uttar Pradesh, Dr Bezwada Gopala Reddy title/post previously held by- Charan Singh	Chief Minister of Uttar Pradesh; 18 October 1970 – 4 April 1971	Succeeded by Kamalapati Tripathi
Government offices
Preceded by Anthony Lancelot Dias	Governor of West Bengal; 6 November 1977 – 11 September 1981	Succeeded by Bhairab Dutt Pande
