= Baba Keenaram =

Aghori ascetic born in Chandauli, India

Personal life
- Known for: Founding Aghori sect of Shaivism

Religious life
- Religion: Hinduism

Baba Keenaram was an Aghori ascetic born in Chandauli, India. He is believed to be the originator of the Aghori sect of Shaivism by some sources. He was considered to be an incarnation of Lord Shiva.

== Early life ==
Aghoracharya Baba Keenaram was born on Chaturdashi in the month of Bhadrapad in 1601 CE at Ramgarh village (now Chandauli of Uttar Pradesh state of India). After his birth, he neither cried nor suckled at his mother's breast for three days. After three days, three monks (who were believed to be manifestations of Lord Sadashiva—Brahma, Vishnu and Mahesh) arrived and whispered some mantras into his ear. After that, the child began to cry for the first time. It is from that day onwards the Lolark Shashti festival is celebrated as Sanskar (Shashti, usually celebrated in the Hindu religion after five days of birth) of Maharaj Shree Baba Kinaram. With the blessing of Hinglaj Mata (Chief Goddess of Aghora) at the Lyari district of Balochistan (in present-day Pakistan), Keenaram started his spiritual journey with the message of social welfare and humanity. Baba Kaluram, known to be a Guru (spiritual teacher) awakened the consciousness of "Aghor" in Keenaram.

== Work ==
Keenaram established himself in the city of Varanasi for the service of the people and enlightened them with ancient wisdom. He has mentioned principles of Aghor in his books Viveksar, Ramgita, Ramrasal and Unmuniram. The book Viveksar written by Baba Keenaram is said to be the most authentic treatise on the principles of Aghor. During his tour, Keenaram first stopped at the dwelling of "Grihast Saint", Shiva Das for a few days. Shiva Das observed Keenarm’s activities very minutely and was impressed by their extraordinary qualities, suspecting him to be an Avatar or a reincarnation. One day while on the way to bathe in the river Ganges, Shiva Das handed over his entire belongings to the boy Keenaram and hid himself in nearby bushes. He observed that the river Ganges became very restless as the boy approached closer. The level of water started to rise and suddenly settled down only after touching Keenaram’s feet. Keenaram was known as the biggest saint of the Era of Aghor, a tradition also known as the Lord Shiva tradition.

== Baba Keenaram Sthal ==
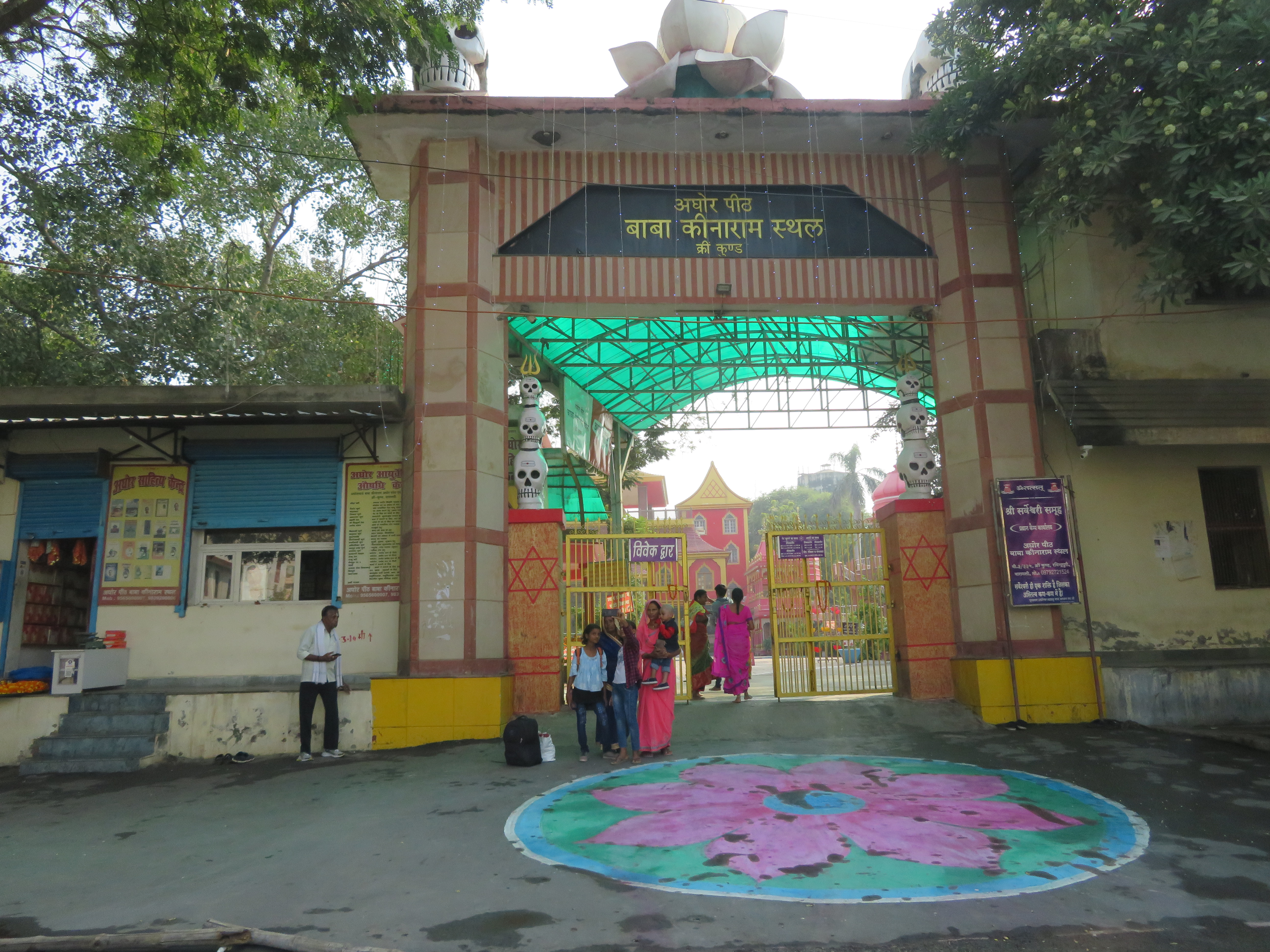
Baba Keenaram Temple, located in Varanasi, Uttar Pradesh, India

Keenaram was the first peethadheswar (founder) of Baba Keenaram Sthal, the headquarters and pilgrimage site of Aghors across the world.

== Death and resting place ==
He is said to have lived for 170 years. His body is buried in a tomb, along with Goddess Hinglaj in a yantra (a mystical geometrical shape to represent the presence of goddess's form), at Baba Keenaram Sthal.

== Legacy ==
His birth anniversary is celebrated annually in Chandauli district. In 2019, Chief Minister Yogi Adityanath attended the ceremony and announced that Keenaram's birthplace would be developed by the government of Uttar Pradesh as a tourist place. Youth of chandauli know his legacy. Ramgarh is known as Baba Kinaram's place
