= Mushqbudji rice =

Type of non-Basmati aromatic rice from Kashmir, India

- Geographical indication
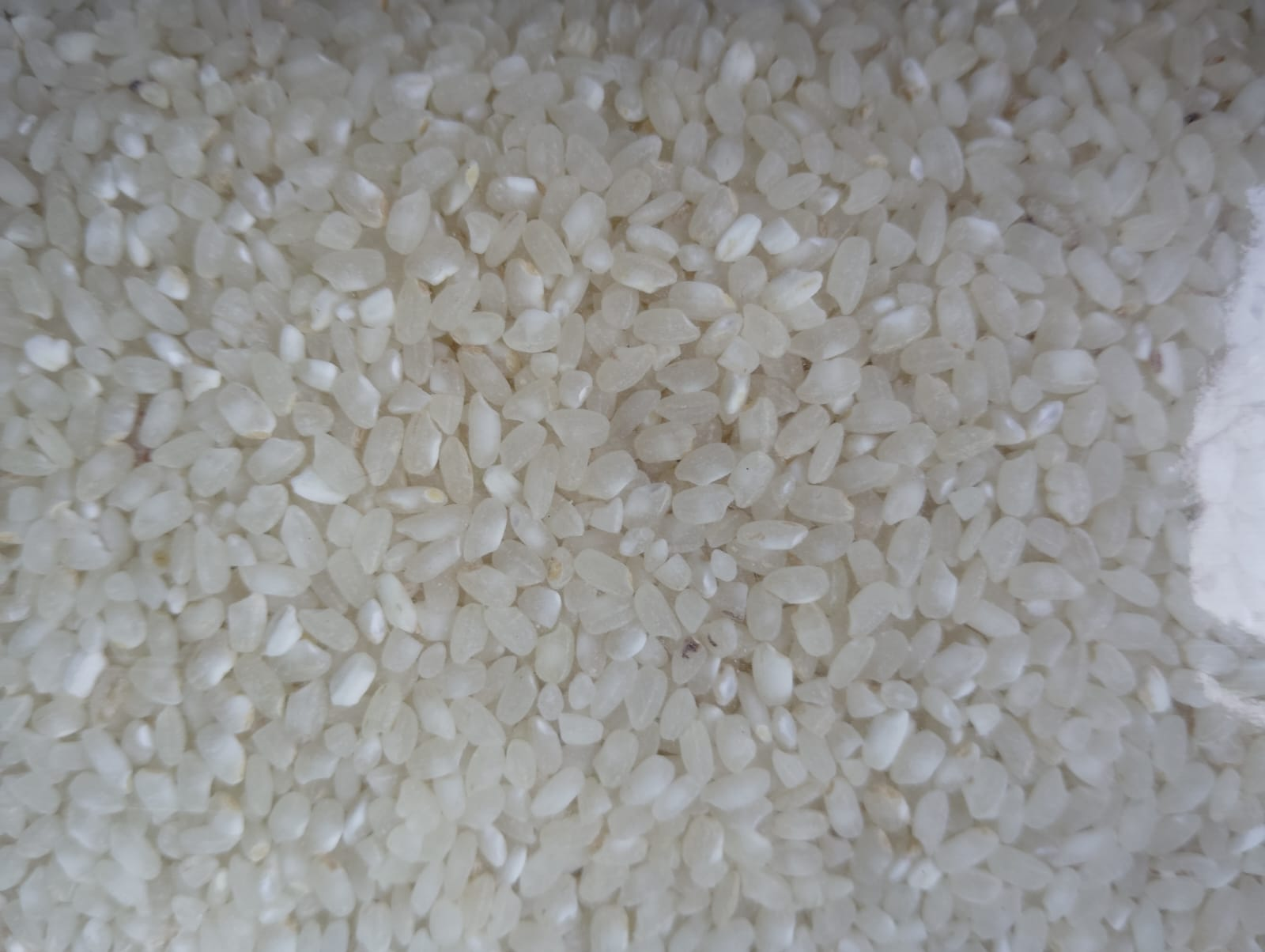
- Mushqbudji rice grains close-up
- Description: Mushqbudji rice is an aromatic rice cultivated in Jammu and Kashmir
- Type: Aromatic rice
- Area: Jammu and Kashmir
- Country: India
- Registered: 31 July 2023
- Official website: ipindia.gov.in

Mushqbudji rice is a variety of non-Basmati, short-grained aromatic rice mainly grown in the Indian Union territory of Jammu and Kashmir growing in the higher reaches of the valley. It is a common and widely cultivated crop in Sagam belt of Anantnag district and the Beerwah belt of Budgam district, and also cultivated in Anantnag and Kulgam in Kashmir by farmers under irrigated conditions.

Under its Geographical Indication tag, it is referred to as "Mushqbudji Rice".

== Name ==
The name "Mushq Budej" (Kashmiri: مشقٕ بدٕج) originates from the Persian words "musk", meaning a strong and pleasant smell, and "budji", refers to rice in the region. Mushqbudji is also reported as Mushk Budji.

== Description ==
Here are the characteristics, and uses of Mushk Budji rice:

=== Characteristics ===
- This rice variety has a nutty flavor, a chewy texture, and a light ivory color with a translucent appearance.

=== Uses ===
- This rice can be enjoyed in various forms, including regular cooked dishes or incorporated into recipes like pulao, biryanis, and curries. Mushk Budji rice variety has been traditionally been served at marriage ceremonies and festivals. In Srinagar's local markets, they were previously sold as "food for the royal families" during the Mughal era.

== Photo Gallery ==
Actual photos from Agriculturist Zahoor Ahmad Reshi of Kulgam, a researcher at Department of Agriculture, Kashmir.

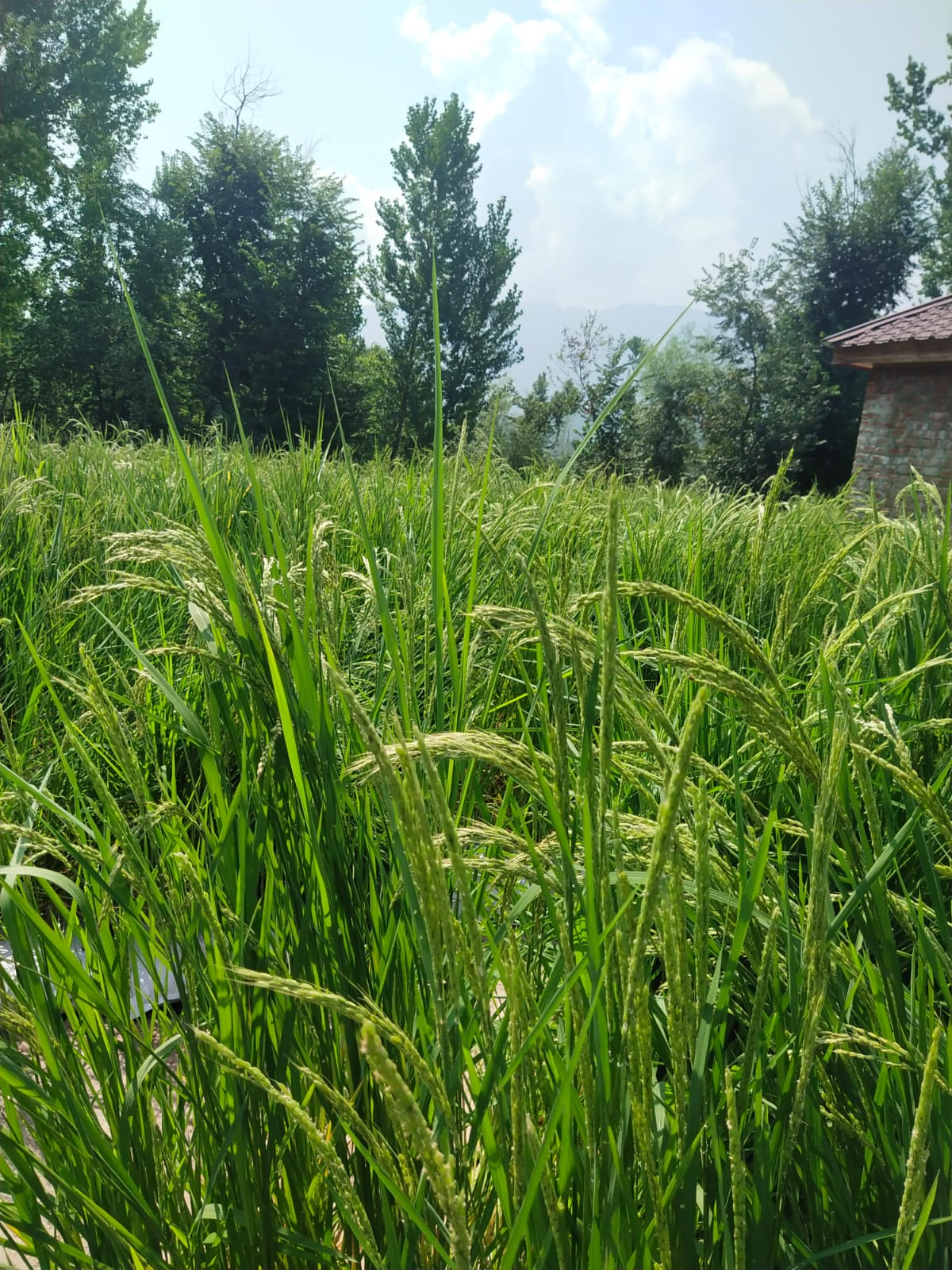
Roof-top rice farm

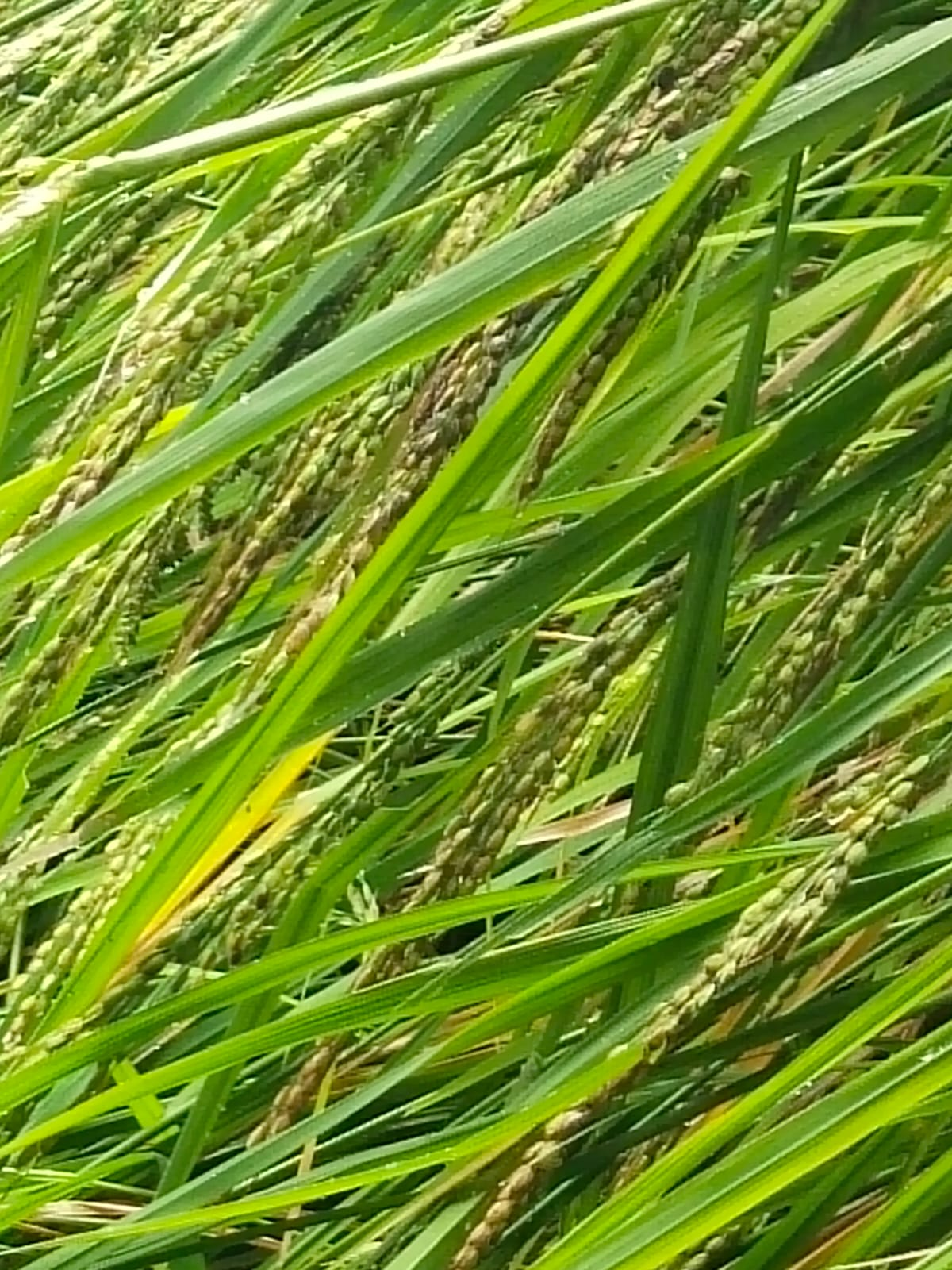
Farm crop close-up

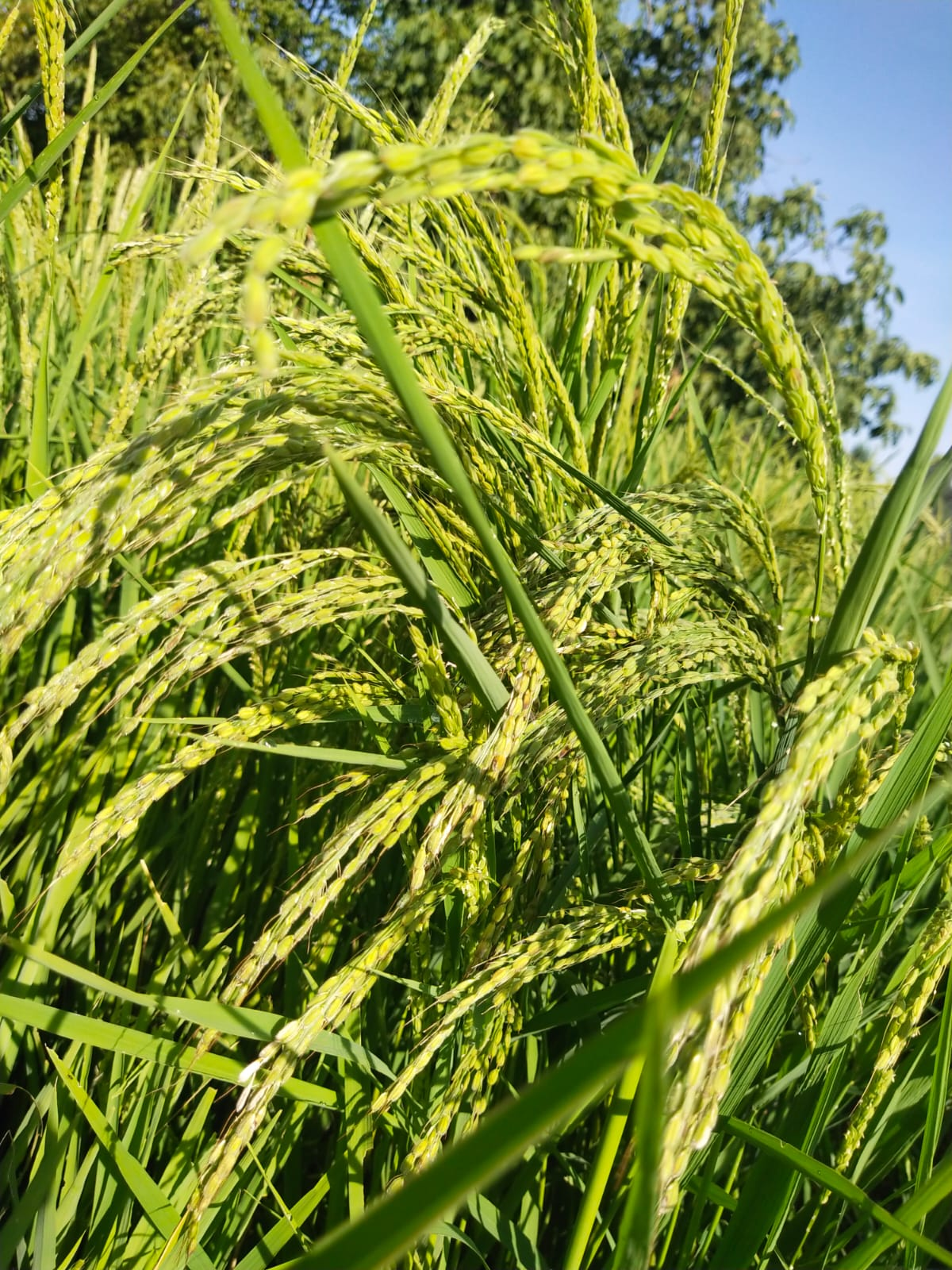
Roof-top farm crop

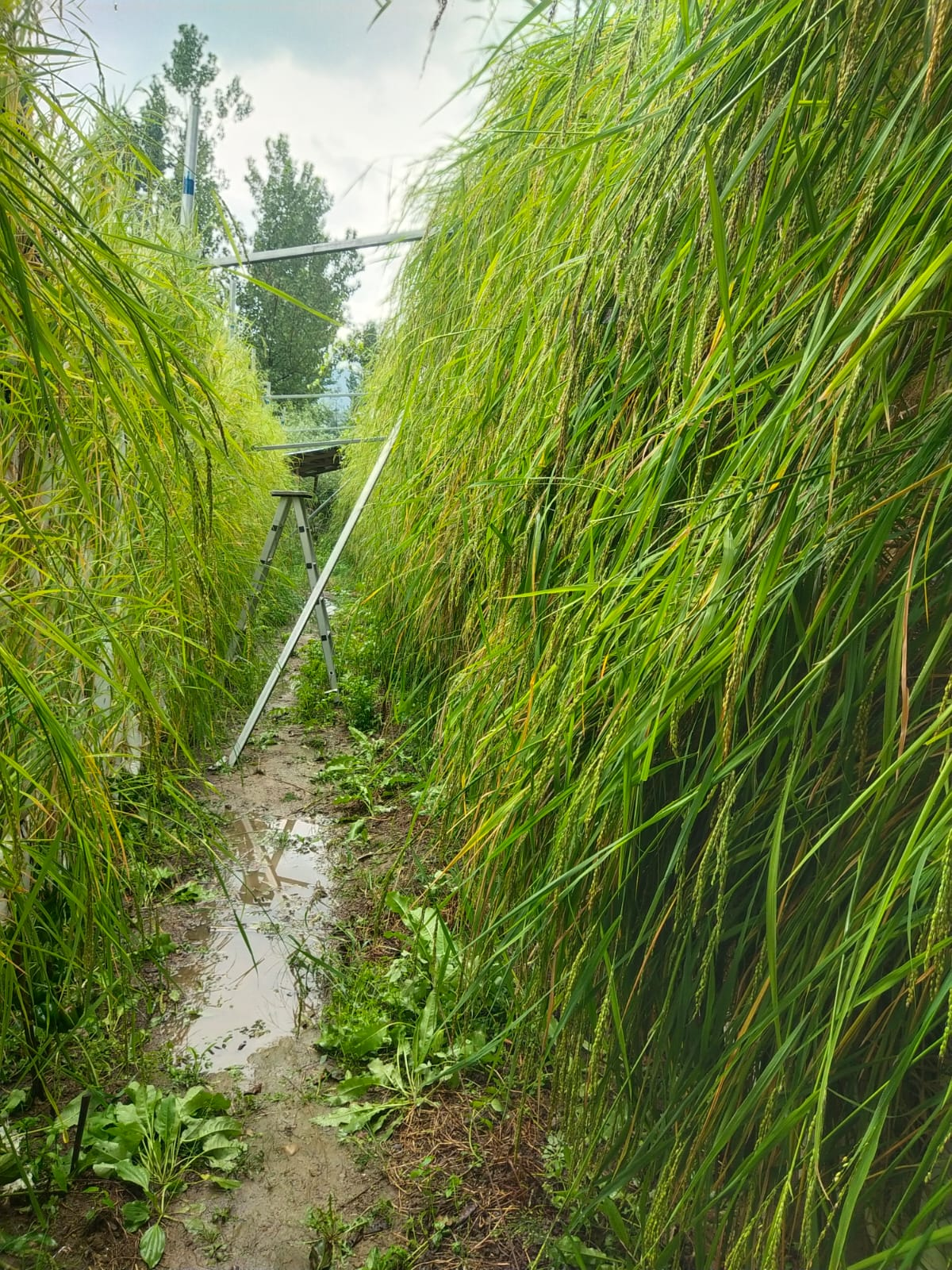
Vertical farming

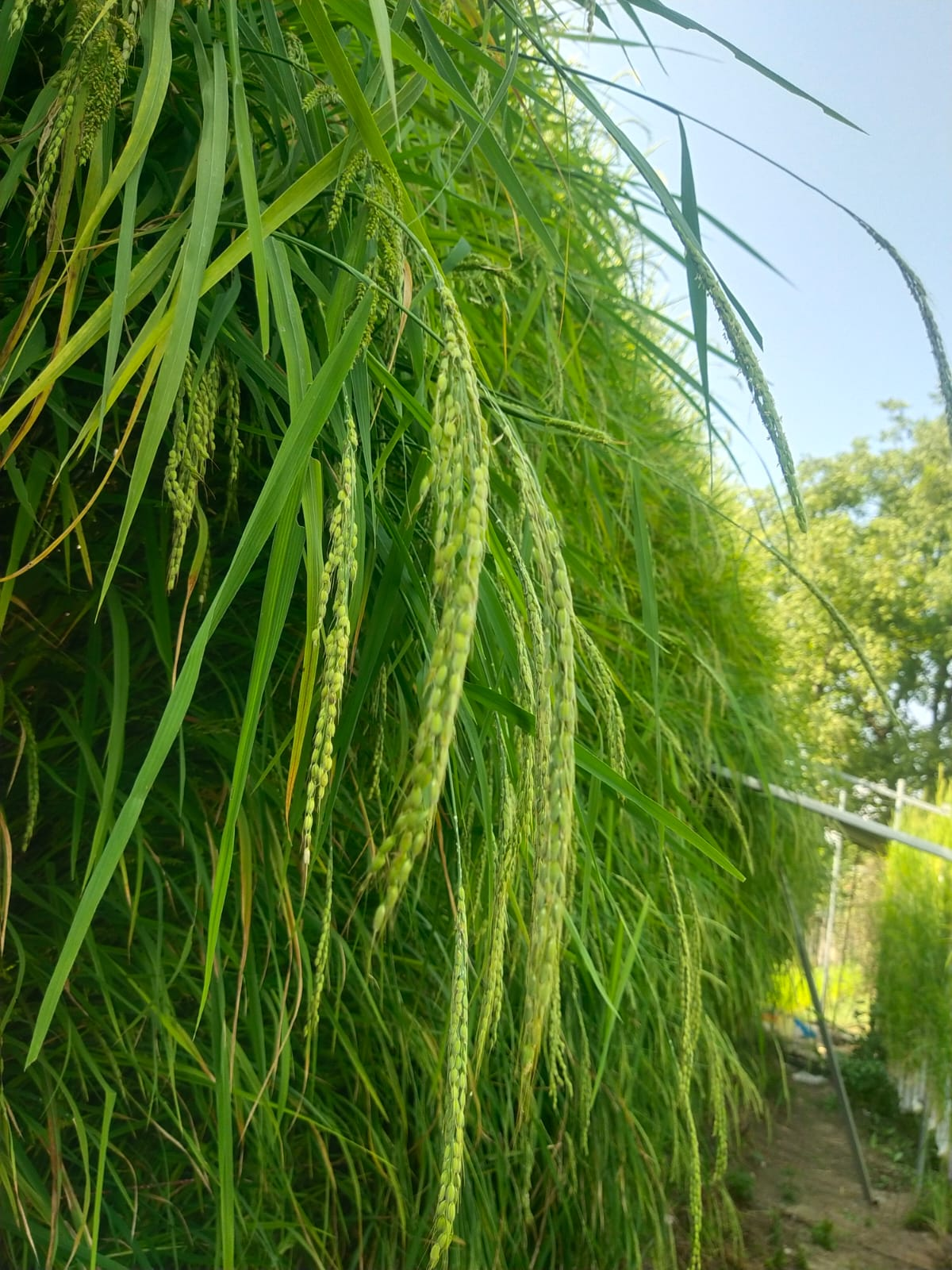
Vertical farming - another pic

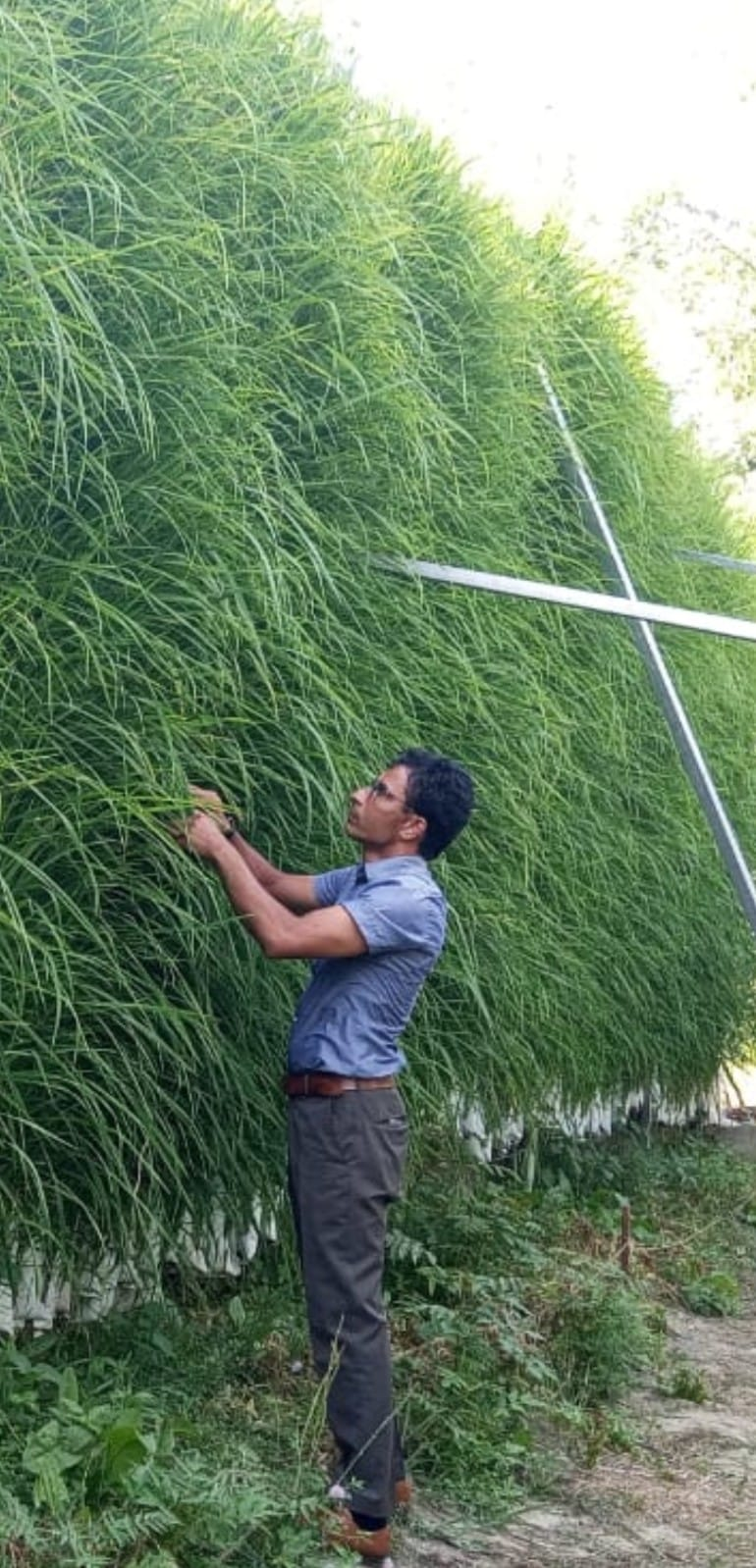
Agriculturist Zahoor Ahmed Reshi working at a Mushqbudji rice vertical farm

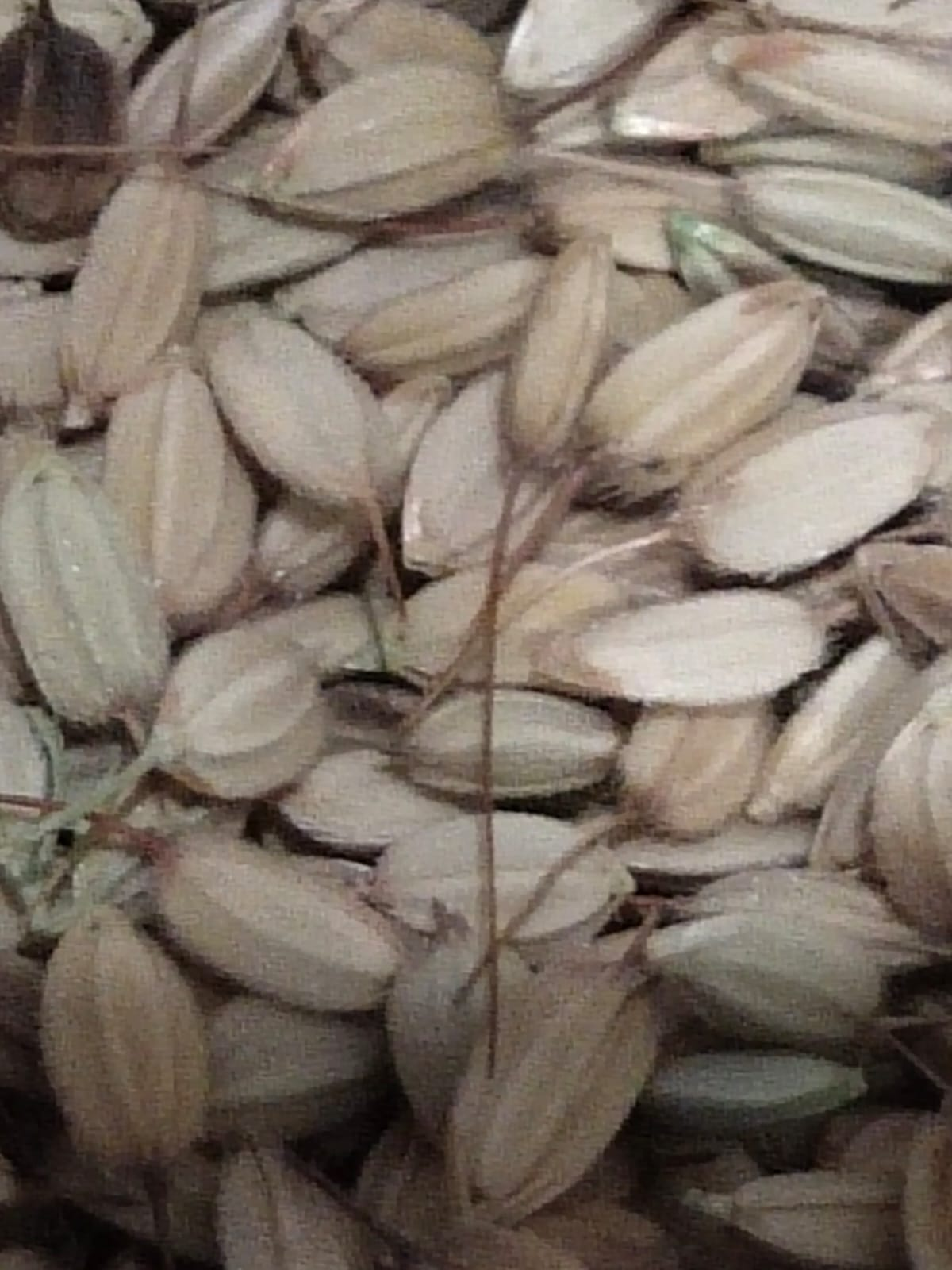
Paddy (unhulled rice)

== Geographical indication ==
It was awarded the Geographical Indication (GI) status tag from the Geographical Indications Registry under the Union Government of India on 31 July 2023 (valid until 13 June 2031).

Sagam Mushqbudji Farmer Producer Company Limited from Sagam, proposed the GI registration of Mushqbudji rice. After filing the application in June 2021, the rice was granted the GI tag in 2023 by the Geographical Indication Registry in Chennai, making the name "Mushqbudji rice" exclusive to the rice grown in the region. It thus became the first rice variety from Jammu and Kashmir and the 11th type of goods from Jammu and Kashmir to earn the GI tag.

The GI tag protects the rice from illegal selling and marketing, and gives it legal protection and a unique identity.

== See also ==
- Uttarakhand lal chawal (red rice)
- Adamchini Chawal
