= Ramesh Jaiswal =

Indian politician

Member of Uttar Pradesh Legislative Assembly
- Incumbent
- Assumed office March 2022
- Preceded by: Sadhana Singh
- Constituency: Mughalsarai

Personal details
- Born: 2 May 1972 (age 54) Mughalsarai, Uttar Pradesh, India
- Party: Bharatiya Janata Party
- Spouse: Rekha Jaiswal (m. 1999)
- Children: 2
- Education: Harish Chandra Postgraduate College, Varanasi, (LLB, 1995)
- Profession: Businessperson, lawyer

Ramesh Jaiswal (born 2 May 1972) is an Indian politician and a member of 18th Legislative Assembly of Uttar Pradesh representing Mughalsarai. He is a member of the Bharatiya Janata Party.

== Personal life ==
Ramesh Jaiswal was born to Mithai Lal Jaiswal in Mughalsarai of Chandauli district in Uttar Pradesh on 2 May 1972. He is a graduate and received his LLB degree from Harish Chandra Postgraduate College, Varanasi in 1995. He married Rekha Jaiswal on 9 February 1999, with whom he has a son and a daughter. Jaiswal is a businessperson by profession.

== Political career ==
In the 2022 Uttar Pradesh Legislative Assembly election, Jaiswal represented Bharatiya Janata Party as a candidate from Mughalsarai and went on to defeat Samajwadi Party's Chandra Shekhar Yadav by a margin of 14,921 votes, succeeding own party member Sadhana Singh in the process.
