= Harish Chandra Postgraduate College =

College in Varanasi, India

- Established: 1860
- Founders: Bharatendu Harishchandra
- Principal: Rajneesh Kunwar
- Location: Maidagin Crossing, Varanasi, Uttar Pradesh, 221001, India; 25.319826°N 83.012362°E
- Campus: Urban Government college
- Language: English & Hindi
- Website: www.hcpgcollege.edu.in

Harish Chandra Postgraduate College is a government college and one of the oldest colleges in Maidagin, Varanasi, India. A government college that offers undergraduate and postgraduate. The Ph.D. degree programs are running in most of the departments. It was founded in 1860 by Bharatendu Harishchandra and opened in 1866 with five students. Admission is done through entrance exams conducted by the college every year. The college campus is now fully circulated by wifi since October 2018.

== History ==
In 1860, the Harish Chandra Vidyalaya Samiti (a non-profit charitable institution registered under Indian Society Act 1860) was incorporated and the same year Harish Chandra Postgraduate College was founded by Bharatendu Harishchandra. The college opened in 1866 with five students. In 1910, the institution started high school, and in 1939 intermediate classes were started.

In October 1951, the college began undergraduate courses in arts and commerce.

=== Timeline ===
- 1860: Harish Chandra Vidyalaya Samiti registered.
- 1860: Harish Chandra Postgraduate College founded.
- 1866: College opened with five students.
- 1910: High school classes started.
- 1939: Intermediate classes started.
- 1951: Affiliation with Banaras Hindu University.
- 1958: Law classes recognised.
- 1960: College shifted its affiliation to the Gorakhpur University.
- 1960: Commenced B.Ed. course.
- 1963: Commenced B.Sc. (Mathematics) course.
- 1974: Commenced B.Sc. (Biology) course.
- 1987: College shifted its affiliation to the Purvanchal University.
- 2009: College shifted its affiliation to the Mahatma Gandhi Kashi Vidyapith.

== Organisation ==
Harish Chandra Postgraduate College's management is headed by a team of 16 members. The team consists of a president, one secretary, seven members, the college principal, four teacher representatives and a non-teaching staff representative.

The principal is responsible for all aspects of college's operations, administration, planning, support services, faculty appointments, curricula and student affairs. The principal is appointed by and reports to the management committee of the college.

== Faculty ==
Harish Chandra Postgraduate College runs five faculties for undergraduate and postgraduate education.

- Faculty of Arts
- Faculty of Commerce
- Faculty of Science
- Faculty of Education
- Faculty of Law

== Notable alumni ==
- Lal Bahadur Shastri: Second Prime Minister of India.
- Bishweshwar Prasad Koirala: 23rd Prime Minister of Nepal
- Sampurnanand: Second Chief Minister of Uttar Pradesh.
- Tribhuvan Narain Singh: Sixth Chief Minister of Uttar Pradesh and Governor of West Bengal
- Mohammad Usman: Highest-ranking officer of Indian Army killed in the Indo-Pakistani War of 1947.
- Ramesh Jaiswal, Member of Uttar Pradesh Legislative Assembly, 2022-27

== See also ==
- List of educational institutions in Varanasi
