= Chakia Assembly constituency =

Constituency of the Uttar Pradesh legislative assembly in India

Coordinates: 25.05°N 83.22°E

Chakia
- Constituency No. 383 for the Uttar Pradesh Legislative Assembly

Constituency details
- Country: India
- Region: North India
- State: Uttar Pradesh
- District: Chandauli
- Total electors: 3,78,414
- Reservation: SC

Member of Legislative Assembly
- 18th Uttar Pradesh Legislative Assembly
- Incumbent Kailash Kharwar
- Party: Bharatiya Janta Party
- Elected year: 2022

Chakia is a constituency of the Uttar Pradesh Legislative Assembly covering the city of Chakia in the Chandauli district of Uttar Pradesh, India.

Chakia is one of five assembly constituencies in the Robertsganj Lok Sabha constituency. Since 2008, this assembly constituency is numbered 383 amongst 403 constituencies.

== Members of the Legislative Assembly ==
Year	Member	Party
1962	Ram Lakhan	Indian National Congress
1967	Bechan Ram	Samyukta Socialist Party
1969	Ram Lakhan	Indian National Congress
1974	Bechan Ram	Indian National Congress
1977	Shyam Deo	Janata Party
1980	Kharpat Ram	Indian National Congress (I)
1985	Kharpat Ram	Indian National Congress
1989	Satyaprakash Sonkar	Janata Dal
1991	Rajesh Kumar	Bharatiya Janata Party
1993	Rajesh Kumar	Bharatiya Janata Party
1996	Satyaprakash Sonkar	Samajwadi Party
2002	Shivtapasya Paswan	Bharatiya Janata Party
2007	Jitendra Kumar	Bahujan Samaj Party
2012	Poonam Sonkar	Samajwadi Party
2017	Sharada Prasad	Bharatiya Janata Party
2022	Kailash Kharwar	Bharatiya Janata Party

== Election results ==
=== 2027 ===
2027 Uttar Pradesh Legislative Assembly election: Chakia
Party	Candidate	Votes	%	±%
INDIA				
NDA				
BSP				
NOTA	None of the above			
Majority				
Turnout				
gain from		Swing		

=== 2022 ===
2022 Uttar Pradesh Legislative Assembly election: Chakia
Party	Candidate	Votes	%	±%
BJP	Kailash	97,812	39.63	▼1.67
SP	Jitendra Kumar	88,561	35.88	▲15.13
BSP	Vikas Azad	44,530	18.04	▼14.71
Jan Adhikar Party	Subash Sonakar	5,148	2.09	▲1.71
CPI(M)	Jainath	2,406	0.97	▼0.35
NOTA	None of the above	2,511	1.02	▼0.35
Majority		9,251	3.75	▼4.8
Turnout		246,794	65.22	▲0.99
BJP hold		Swing		

=== 2017 ===
Sharada Prasad of the Bharatiya Janta Party, defeated Jitendra Kumar of the Bahujan Samaj Party by a margin of 20,063 votes during the 2017 Uttar Pradesh Legislative Elections.

2017 Uttar Pradesh Legislative Assembly Election: Chaki
Party	Candidate	Votes	%	±%
BJP	Sharada Prasad	96,890	41.3	
BSP	Jitendra Kumar	76,827	32.75	
SP	Poonam	48,687	20.75	
CPI(M)	Sriprasad	3,098	1.32	
NOTA	None of the above	3,162	1.37	
Majority		20,063	8.55	
Turnout		234,587	64.23	

== See also ==
- Chandauli district
- List of constituencies of the Uttar Pradesh Legislative Assembly
