= Baba Keenaram Sthal =

Hindu temple in Varanasi, Uttar Pradesh, India

Baba Keenaram Temple
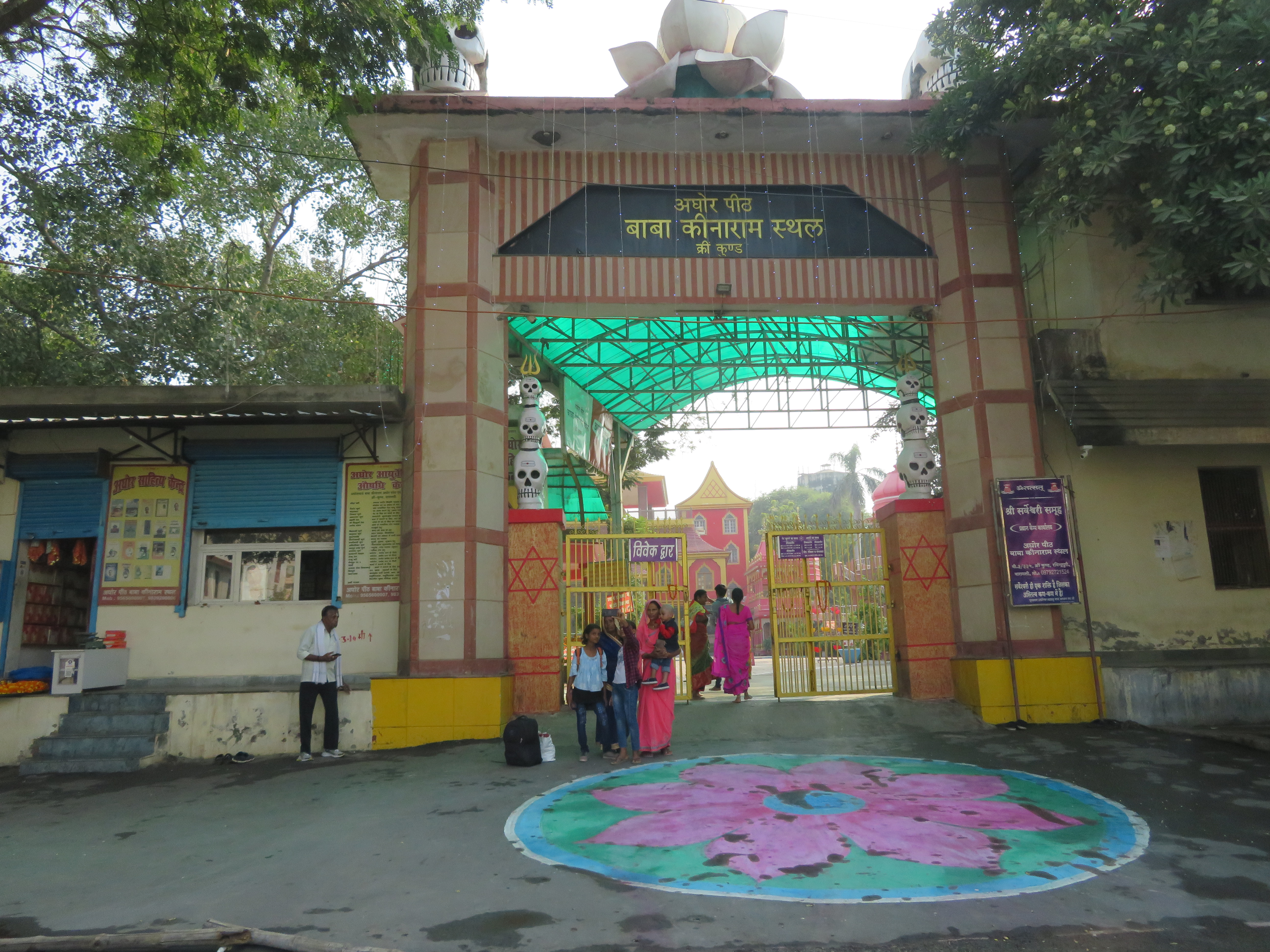
- Baba Keenaram Temple in 2022

- Location within Uttar Pradesh

Religion
- Affiliation: Hinduism
- District: Varanasi
- Deity: Vishveshwar or Vishwanath (Shiva)
- Festival: Maha Shivaratri

Location
- Location: Varanasi
- State: Uttar Pradesh
- Country: India
- Interactive map of Baba Keenaram Temple
- Coordinates: 25°17′45.90″N 83°0′09.50″E

Architecture
- Type: Hindu temple
- Elevation: 77 m (253 ft)

Website
- aghorpeeth.org

Baba Keenaram Sthal or Baba Keenaram Sthal-Kreem Kund is a spiritual centre, headquarters, and pilgrimage site of the Aghori sect of Shaivism. It is located in Ravindrapuri, Varanasi, a district of Uttar Pradesh, India. The temple is dedicated to Baba Keenaram, the originator of the Aghori sect of Shaivism.

== See also ==
- List of Hindu temples in Varanasi
- Nepali Mandir
- Tulsi Manas Mandir
- Bharat Mata Mandir
