= Adamchini rice =

Variety of rice from Uttar Pradesh, India

Adamchini Chawal (आदमचीनी चावल)
- Geographical indication
- Description: Adamchini Chawal is an aromatic rice cultivated in Uttar Pradesh
- Type: Aromatic rice
- Area: Uttar Pradesh
- Country: India
- Registered: 22 February 2023
- Official website: ipindia.gov.in

Adamchini Chawal is a variety of non-Basmati, traditional, short-grained aromatic rice mainly grown in the Indian state of Uttar Pradesh. It is a common and widely cultivated crop in Chandauli, Mirzapur, Varanasi and Sonebhadra, and Vindhya region of Eastern Uttar Pradesh.

Under its Geographical Indication tag, it is referred to as "Adamchini Chawal ".

== Name ==
The name "Adamchini" is derived from the Hindi word "chini", meaning sugar, due to the rice's small, sugar crystal-like grains, while "Chawal" means rice in the state language of Hindi.

== Description ==
Some of the features are as follows:

=== Characteristics ===
- Drought-tolerant and disease-resistant, this rice variety has a strong aroma, short-bold scented grains, and intermediate amylose content, resulting in softness with good taste and smell.

=== Nutritional Benefits ===
- This rice variety is rich in carbohydrates, protein, fat, and fiber, and is a good source of vitamins (Vitamin-D, B group vitamins) and minerals (iron), supporting healthy bowel function, improving digestion, and relieving constipation.

=== Cooking and Consumer Preferences ===
- This rice variety boasts excellent cooking characteristics and enjoys high consumer preference due to its unique aroma, taste, and texture.

== Geographical indication ==
It was awarded the Geographical Indication (GI) status tag from the Geographical Indications Registry, under the Union Government of India, on 22 February 2023 (valid till 3 November 2030).

M/s. Ishani Agro Producer Company Limited, and Human Welfare Association from Chandauli, proposed the GI registration of Adamchini Chawal. After filing the application in November 2020, the rice was granted the GI tag in 2023 by the Geographical Indications Registry in Chennai, making the name "Adamchini Chawal " exclusive to the rice grown in the region. It thus became the second rice variety from Uttar Pradesh after Kalanamak rice and the 37th type of goods from Uttar Pradesh to earn the GI tag.

The GI tag protects the rice from illegal selling and marketing, and gives it legal protection and a unique identity.

== See also ==
- Uttarakhand lal chawal (red rice)
- Mushqbudji rice
