= Chandra Prabha Wildlife Sanctuary =

Area in Uttar Pradesh, India

Chandra Prabha Sanctuary
- IUCN category IV (habitat/species management area)
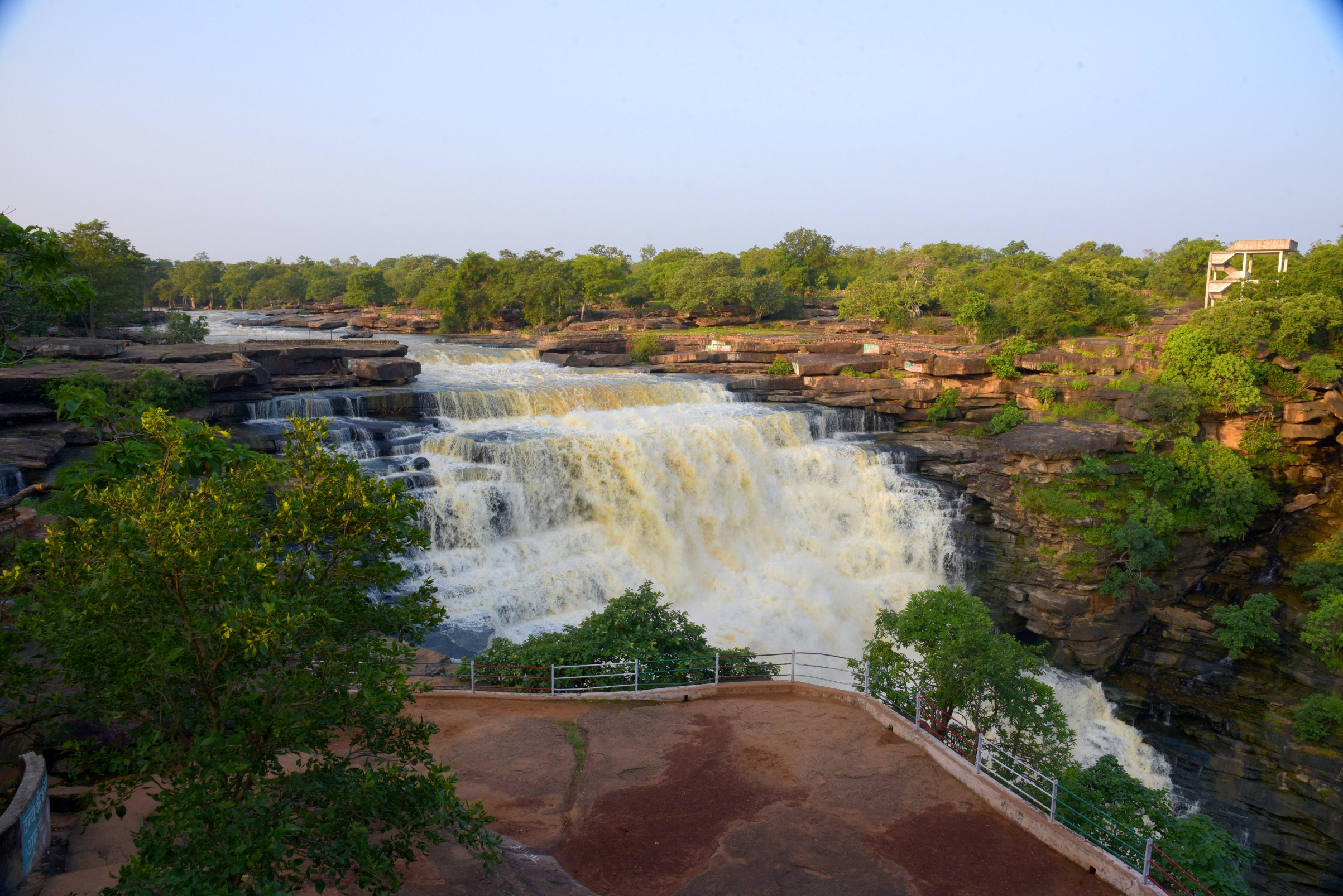
- Waterfall in Chandra Prabha Sanctuary

- Location within Uttar Pradesh Location within India
- Interactive map of Chandra Prabha Sanctuary
- Location: Chandauli district, Uttar Pradesh, India
- Nearest city: Varanasi, Uttar Pradesh, India
- Coordinates: 25.7°N 83.27°E

The Chandra Prabha Wildlife Sanctuary, also known as Chandraprabha, is situated in Chandauli district of Uttar Pradesh in central India. Chandra Prabha Wildlife Sanctuary is situated about 70 kilometres from the city of Varanasi.

== History ==
The area was made a hunting preserve for the rulers of Benares in the second half of the 18th century. The wildlife sanctuary was established in May 1957. Asiatic lions were introduced at Chandra Prabha in 1958. The exercise was successful in the beginning, with the number of lions increasing from three to eleven by 1969. However, the following year the lions were found missing. The plan was again revived in 1993 although the Indian Government is yet to take a decision in this regard.

== Location ==
Chandra Prabha Sanctuary is spread over an area of 78 km^{2} and lies on the Naugarh and Vijaigarh hillocks on the north slope of the Kaimur Range. The Karamnasha River, a tributary of the Ganges, flows through the sanctuary, as does the Chandraprabha River, a tributary of the Karamnasha.

== Flora and fauna ==
The sanctuary has an area of 78 square kilometres. The sanctuary lies within the Lower Gangetic Plains moist deciduous forests ecoregion.

Plant communities include alluvial savanna forest, southern dry mixed deciduous forest, dry deciduous scrub and savanna, dry tropical riverine forest, and desert thorn forest and scrub.

Fauna includes leopard, wild boar, nilgai (Boselaphus tragocamelus), sambar deer (Cervus unicolor), chinkara (Gazella gazella), and chital (Axis axis), and many species of birds.

== Attractions ==
A variety of wild animals are found at Chandra Prabha. These include blackbucks, chital, sambar, nilgai, wild boar, porcupine and chinkara. The reptilian species include python.

The park is a bird watcher's paradise, as one can see around 150 species of birds. The natural vegetation consists of mahua, saagun, amaltas, tendu, koraiya, ber etc. In terms of flora, it is a typical dry deciduous forest composed of gneiss and laminated stone.

== Access ==
Chandra Prabha sanctuary is located just 65 km from the city center of Varanasi. The most convenient way to reach the park is by hiring a taxi and driving down. The journey takes approximately two hours. The nearest rail junction is Pt. DD Upadhyaya and Varanasi, which is well connected to most parts of India.
