= Mughalsarai =

City in Uttar Pradesh, India

- City
- Pandit Deen Dayal Upadhyaya Nagar
- Location in Uttar Pradesh, India
- Coordinates: 25.3°N 83.12°E
- Country: India
- State: Uttar Pradesh
- District: Chandauli
- Named for: Mughals; Deen Dayal Upadhyaya

Government
  - Body: Municipal Council
  - Chairman: Sonu Kinnar (Independent)
  - MLA: Ramesh Jaiswal (BJP)
- Elevation: 65 m (213 ft)

Population (2011)
  - Total: 109,650

Language
  - Official: Hindi
  - Additional official: Urdu
  - Regional: Bhojpuri
- Time zone: UTC+05:30 (IST)
- PIN: 232101
- Telephonic Code: 05412
- Vehicle registration: UP 67 XX XXXX

Mughalsarai (/ˌmuːɡhælˈsɑːreɪɪ/; English: Mughal Tavern), officially known as Pandit Deen Dayal Upadhyaya Nagar since 2018, is a city and a municipal board in the Chandauli district of Uttar Pradesh. Located around 16 kilometres (10 miles) from Chandauli town, the district headquarters, it is an important railway junction.

== History ==
Mughalsarai is located along the Grand Trunk Road (NH 19), also called Sadak-e-Azam by Sher Shah Suri, was one of the corridors connecting North India with the east during the Mughal period. In past centuries, it has been variously known as Mughalchak, Mangalpur and Oven Nagar. The township was named Mughalsarai when Indian railways established a junction here in 1883.

In August 2018, the city was renamed as Pandit Deen Dayal Upadhyaya Nagar, after Deendayal Upadhyaya, a politician and leader of the Bharatiya Jana Sangh.

== Geography ==
Mughalsarai is bisected by NH 19 into three parts. The southern part mainly consists of railway colonies like Vasant Vihar, New Central Colony, Diesel Colony, Haper Colony, Shastri Colony, RPF Colony, European colony, Shubhash Nagar, Loco Colony, and Roza Colony, Plant-Depot Colony and Saresar, Alampur. It starts after the Parao Road in Varanasi and continues until Alinagar Road which comes after Railway Colony on the south. A few mohallas are near the railway station like Qassab Mohal, and Gram Panchayats like Amoghpur, Taranpur, Pashurampur, Dharamshala, Mainatali and Galla Mandi. However, situated on the west side are the Kailashpuri and Ravinagar colonies which compose the poshest area in the city.

== Demographics ==
As of 2011 Indian Census, Mughalsarai had a total population of 109,650, of which 57,682 were males and 51,968 were females. Population within the age group of 0 to 6 years was 14,864. The total number of literates in Mughalsarai was 76,936, which constituted 70.2% of the population with male literacy of 76.0% and female literacy of 63.7%. The effective literacy rate of 7+ population of Mughalsarai was 81.2%, of which male literacy rate was 87.9% and female literacy rate was 73.7%. The Scheduled Castes and Scheduled Tribes population was 17,943 and 2,093 respectively. Mughalsarai had 16,796 households in 2011.

== Politics ==
- A Municipal Council represent the urban area.
- Mughalsarai (Assembly constituency) represents the area.

== Transportation ==
The Pandit Deen Dayal Upadhyaya Junction railway station is the fourth busiest station in India, with about 125 passenger trains passing through it.

== Notable people ==
- Lal Bahadur Shastri, the second Prime Minister of India was born here.
- Ramesh Jaiswal, member of 18th Uttar Pradesh Assembly
