= Parasi Kalan =

- Village
- Location in Uttar Pradesh, India
- Coordinates: 25.1579°N 83.3081°E
- Country: India
- State: Uttar Pradesh
- District: Chandauli

Parasi Kalan is a village panchayat located in the Chandauli district of Uttar Pradesh, India. Lucknow is the state capital for Parasi Kalan village, located 312.9 kilometres (194.4 mi) away from Parasi Kalan.

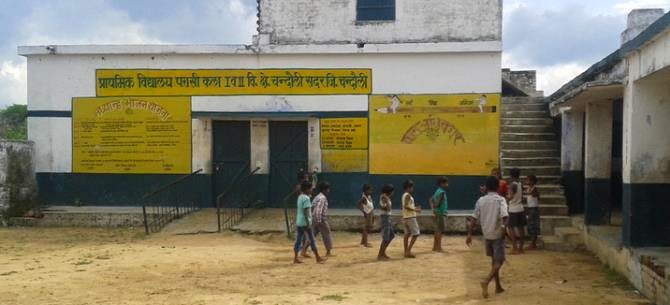
Primary School - Parasi Kalan

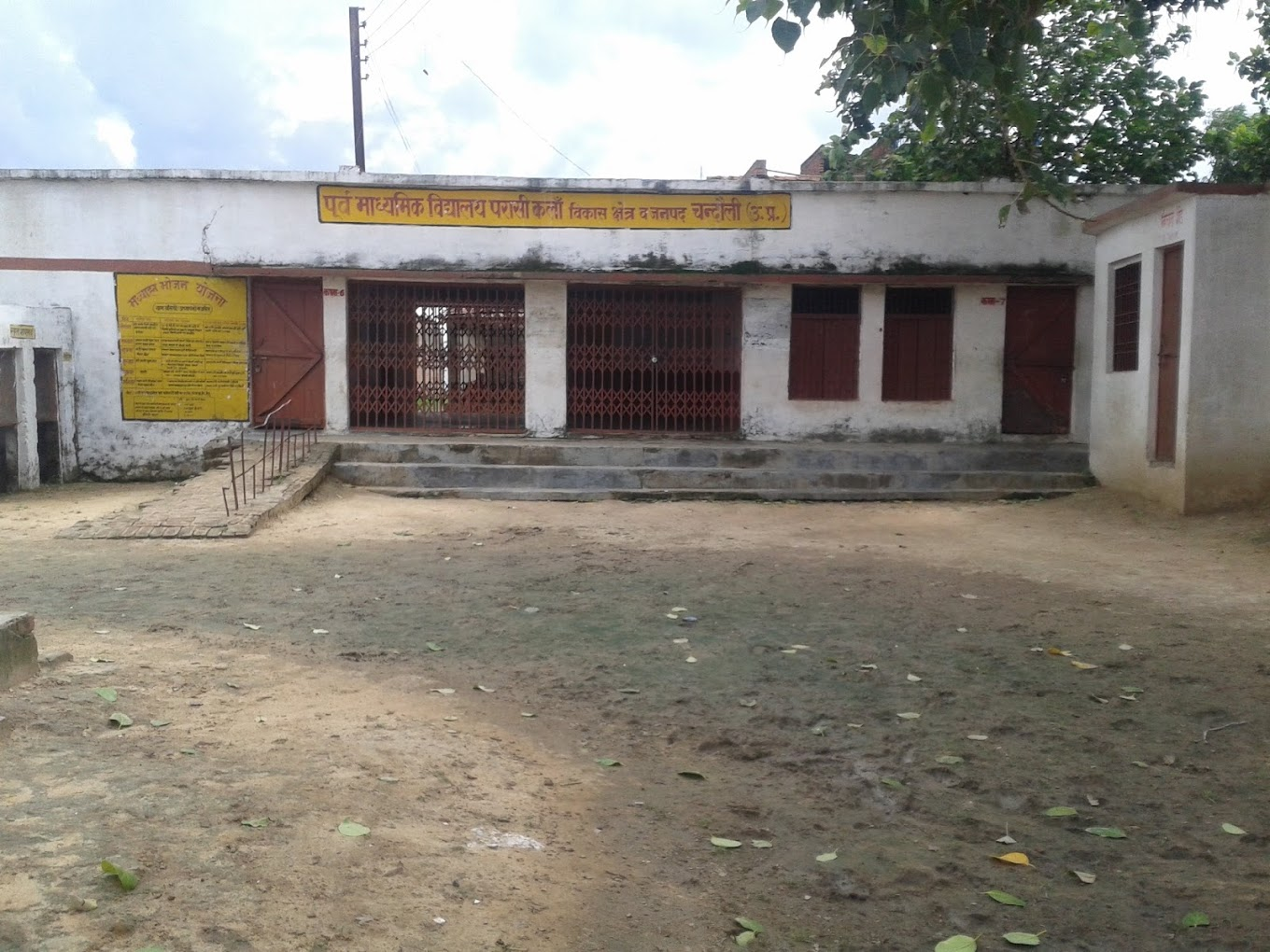
Middle School - Parasi Kalan

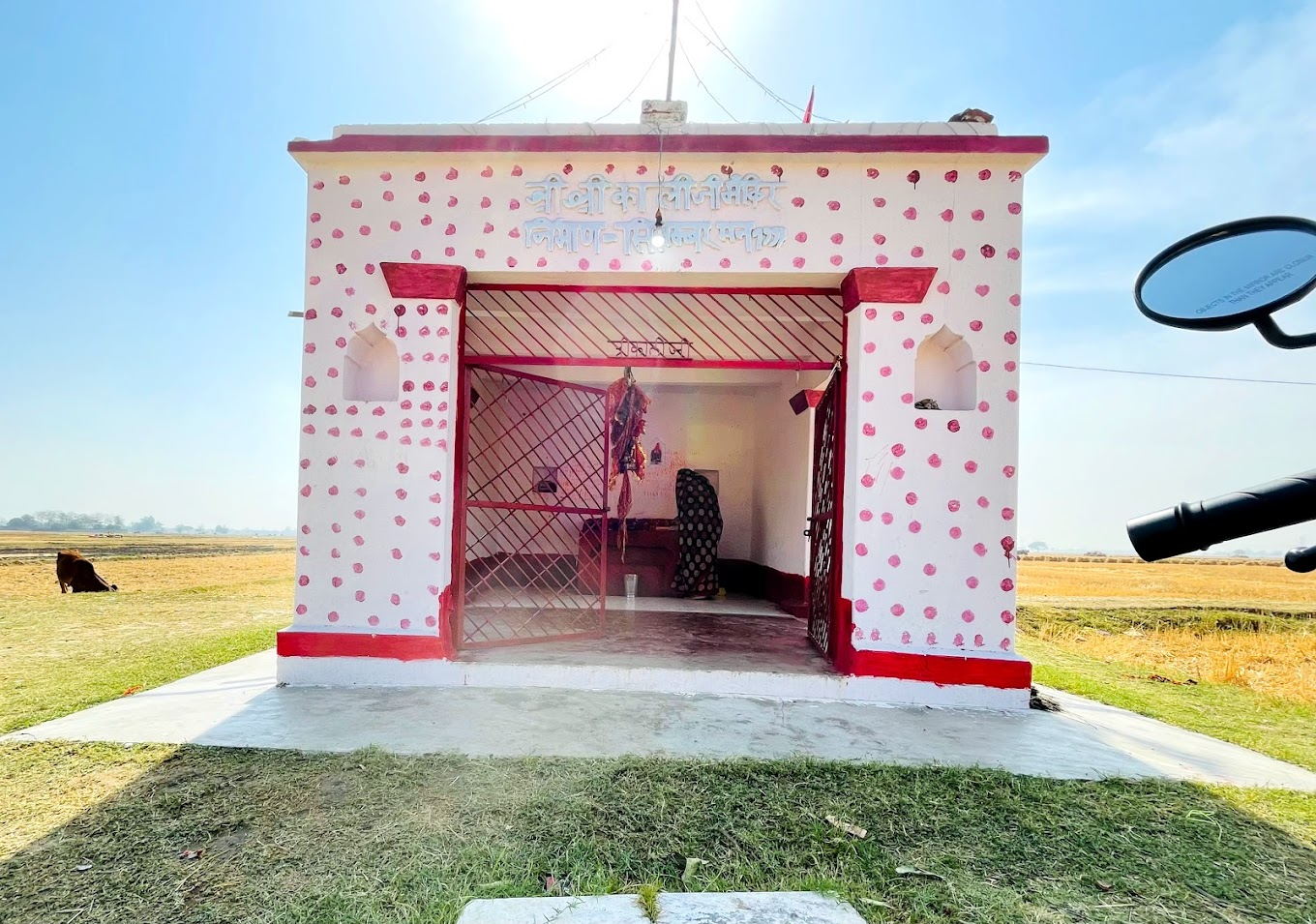
काली जी मंदिर - परासी कलां

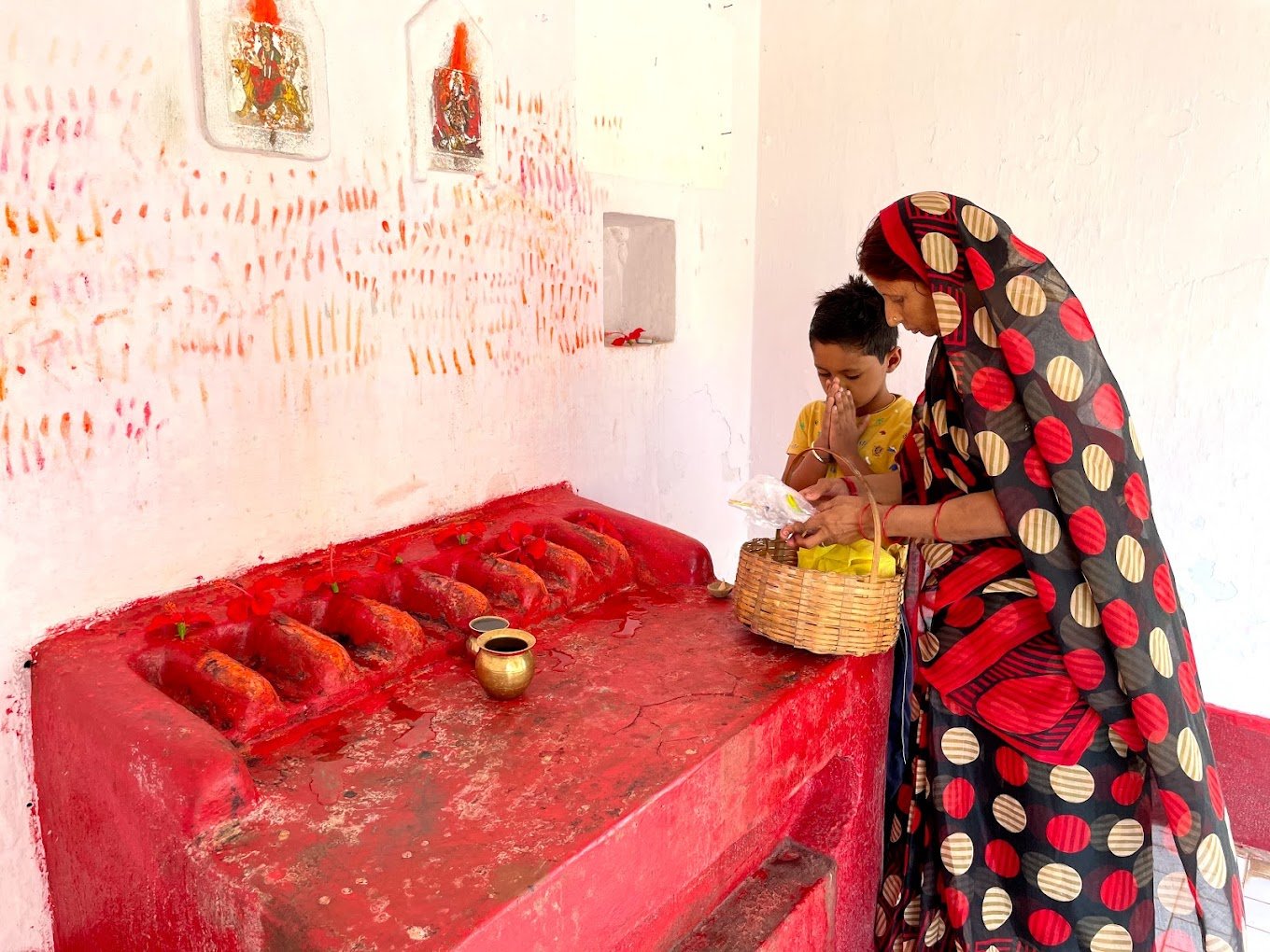
काली जी मंदिर - परासी कलां

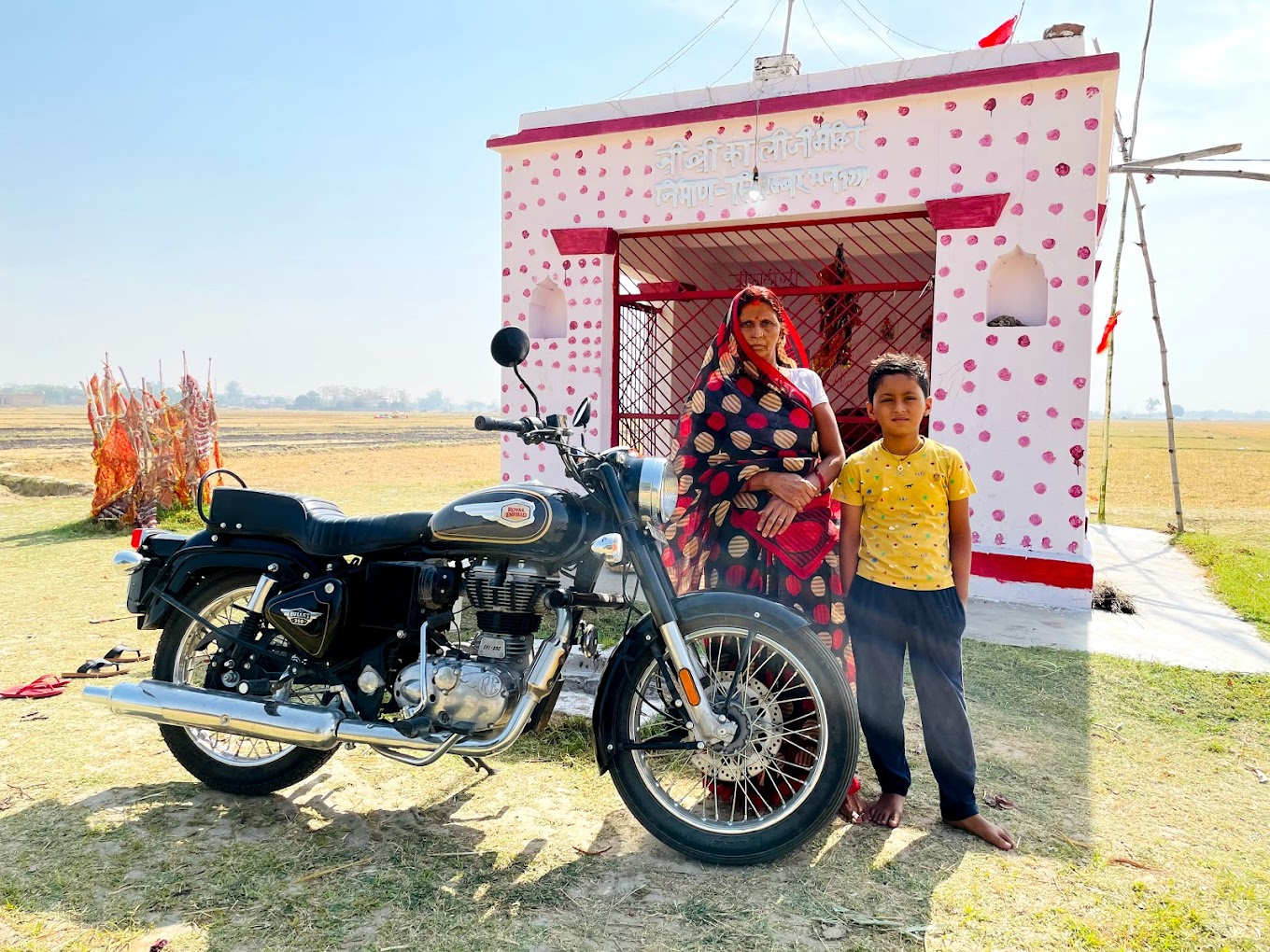
काली जी मंदिर - परासी कलां

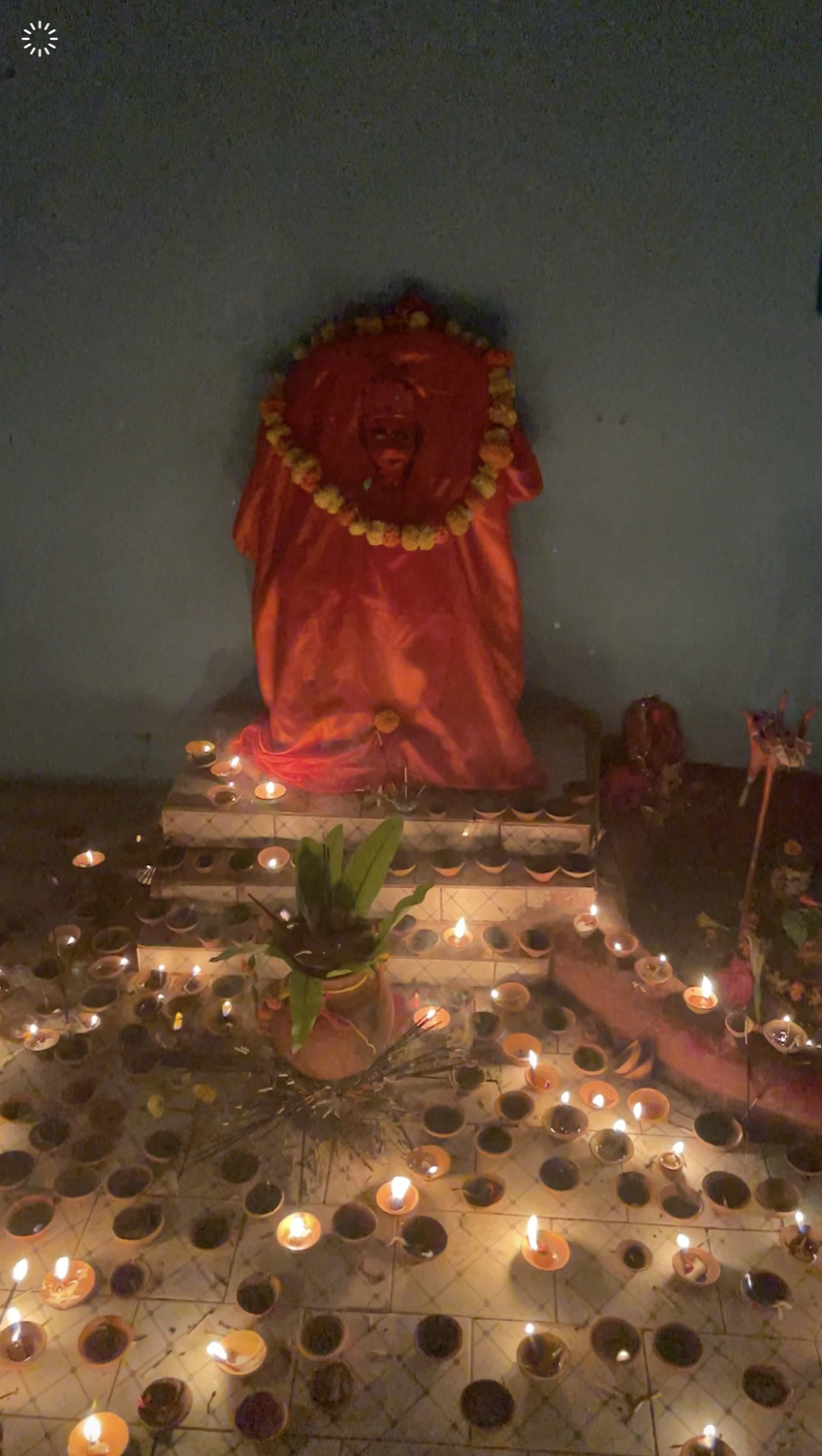
Hanuman Ji - Parasi Kalan

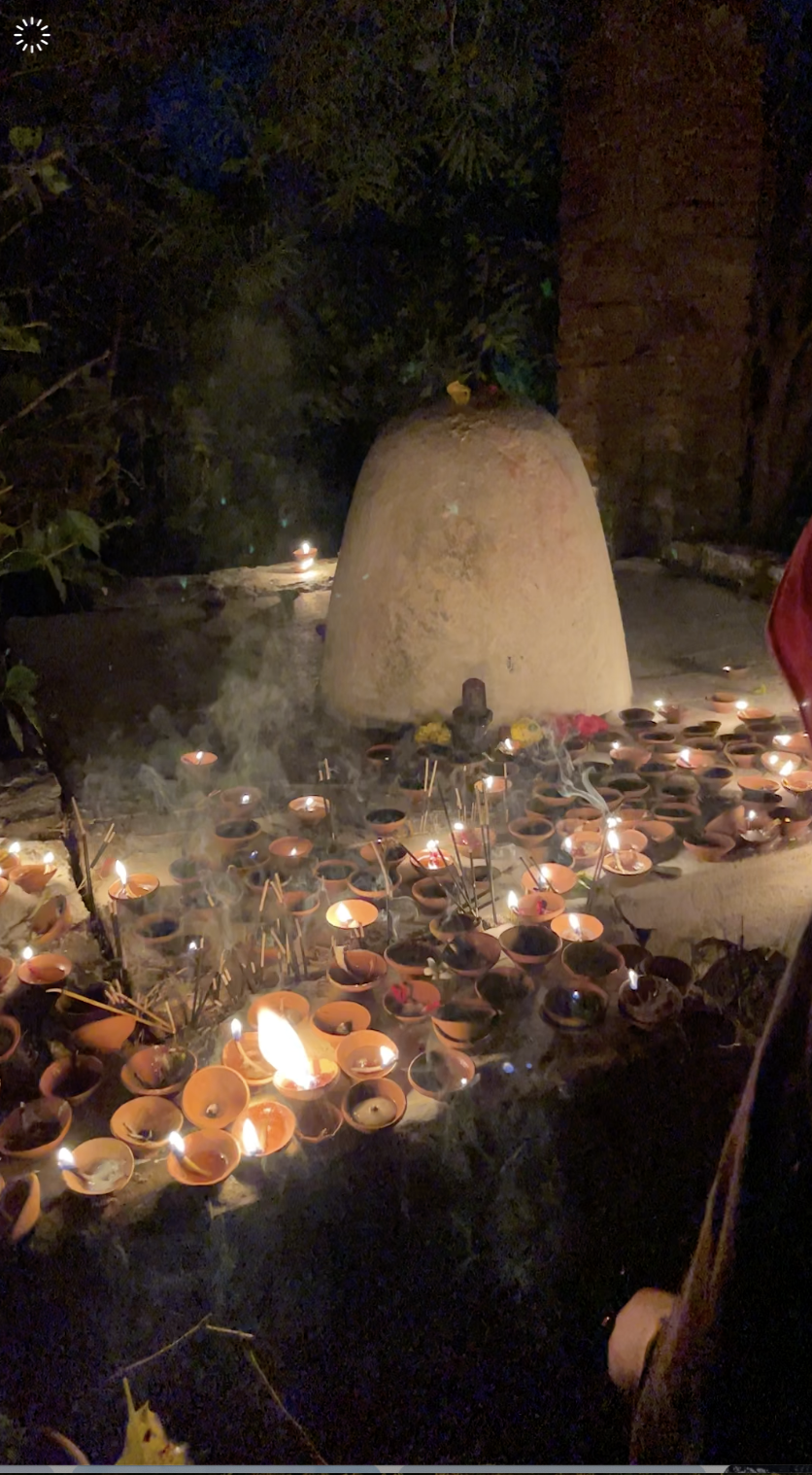
Dih Baba - Parasi Kalan

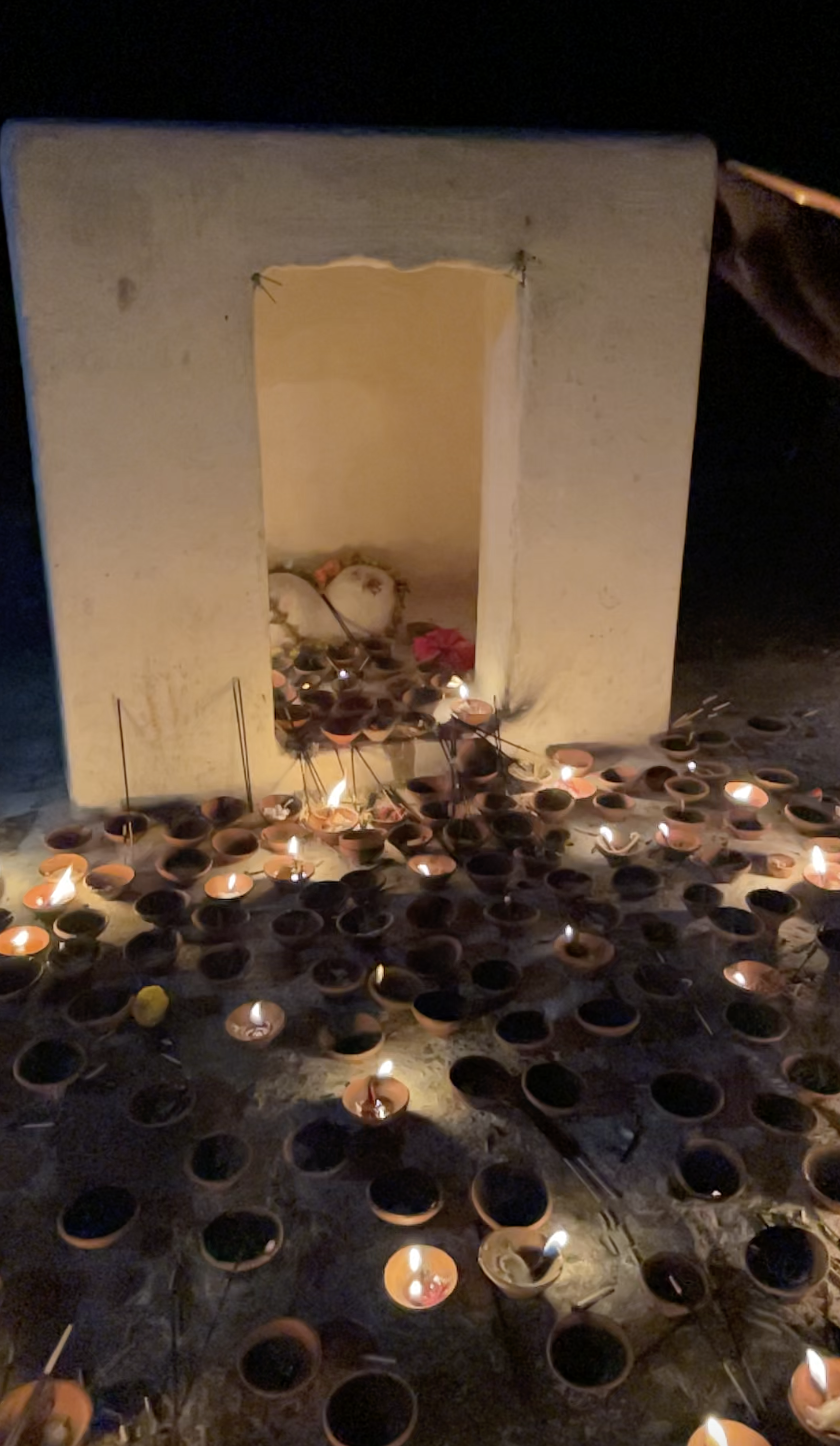
Budhiya Mayi
