= Chakia, Uttar Pradesh =

Chakia
- Town
- Location in Uttar Pradesh, India Chakia (India)
- Coordinates: 25.05°N 83.22°E
- Country: India
- State: Uttar Pradesh
- District: Chandauli
- Elevation: 78 m (256 ft)

Population (2001)
  - Total: 13,667

Languages
  - Official: Hindi
  - Additional official: Urdu
  - Regional: Bhojpuri
- Time zone: UTC+5:30 (IST)
- Postal code: 232103
- Vehicle registration: UP
- Website: up.gov.in

Chakia (Hindi: चकिया, some times written as Chakiya) is a small town (nagar panchayat) and the sub-divisional headquarters of Chakia Tehsil in the District of Chandauli of Varanasi Division in the northern Indian state of Uttar Pradesh.

== Geography ==
The town has an average elevation of 78 metres (256 ft).

The Chandra Prabha Wildlife Sanctuary, located nearby in the Vindhya hills, is well known for its diverse flora and fauna and serves as a popular destination for nature enthusiasts. The tehsil's landscape features a blend of forests, dams, rivers and hills, much of which lies within the Chandra Prabha Sanctuary. Karamnasa, Chandraprabha and Garai rivers drain the tehsil.

== History ==
In British India Chakia was part of the Benares State and was one of the tehsils of Varanasi district until 1997. The tehsil stretches from Gangetic plains to the center of Vindhyas plateau. A good part of the tehsil lies on the Vindhya plateau.

== Economy ==
The economy of the region is largely agricultural.

== Demographics ==
As of 2011 India census, the Chakia Nagar Panchayat had a population of 17,356, of which 9,050 were males, and 8,306 were females.

Population of children aged 0–6 years was 2,440 which translated into 14.06% of total population of the Nagar Panchayat. Sex ratio was 918 females per 1,000 males against state average of 912 females per 1,000 males. Moreover, the child sex ratio in Chakia was around 883:1,000 compared to Uttar Pradesh's average of 902:1,000. Chakia's literacy rate was 75.90%, which was higher than the state average of 67.68%. In Chakia, male literacy rate was around 81.43% compared to female's 69.91%.

== Sights ==
- Chandra Prabha Wildlife Sanctuary— The sanctuary is famous for its wildlife and two waterfalls, Raj Dari and Dev Dari, and a reservoir.
- Latif-Shah Dam— This dam is considered one of the oldest dams in India, Which was completed in 1921; it is built on the river Karm-nasha. The reservoir created by the dam is used mainly for irrigation.
- Kali Temple— The temple devoted to goddess Kali was built by the King of Banaras State in the 16th century. The temple campus includes a large pond.
- Maharaja Quila— A small fort built by Raja Balwant Singh of Benares to rest during hunting trips.
- Mushakhad Dam— Another dam on Karm-nasha. The reservoir created by this dam is used mainly for irrigation.
- Jageshwarnath Temple— The temple is devoted to Lord Shiva, situated on the banks of river Chandra-Prabha, a short distance from the town.

== Transportation ==
Chakia currently lacks regular mass transit options. Government-run bus service may be infrequently available. The nearest railway station, Pandit Deendayal Upadhyay Junction, is approximately 30 kilometres away. The nearest airport, the Lal Bahadur Shastri International Airport, named after the second prime minister of India, lies about 60 kilometers northwest of Chakia.
