= Chahaniya =

Community development block in Uttar Pradesh, India

Chahaniya (Chahania) is a community development block in Chandauli district of Uttar Pradesh, India. It is one of the nine blocks in the district.

== See also ==
- Chandauli district
