= Mughalsarai Assembly constituency =

Uttar Pradesh Legislative Assembly constituency, India

Coordinates: 25.28°N 83.12°E

Mughalsarai
- Constituency No. 380 for the Uttar Pradesh Legislative Assembly

Constituency details
- Country: India
- Region: North India
- State: Uttar Pradesh
- District: Chandauli
- Total electors: 4,00,830
- Reservation: None

Member of Legislative Assembly
- 18th Uttar Pradesh Legislative Assembly
- Incumbent Ramesh Jaiswal
- Party: Bharatiya Janta Party
- Elected year: 2017

Mughalsarai is a constituency of the Uttar Pradesh Legislative Assembly covering the city of Mughalsarai in the Chandauli district of Uttar Pradesh, India. It is one of five assembly constituencies in the Chandauli Lok Sabha constituency. Since 2008, this assembly constituency is numbered 380 amongst 403 constituencies.

As of 2022, the Member of Legislative Assembly from the seat is Bharatiya Janta Party candidate Ramesh Jaiswal who won in the 2022 Uttar Pradesh Legislative Assembly election by defeating Samajwadi Party candidate Chandra Shekhar Yadav by a margin of 14,921 votes.

== Members of Legislative Assembly ==
Year	Member	Party
1957	Shyam Lal Yadav	Indian National Congress
1962	Uma Shanker	Socialist Party
1967	Shyam Lal Yadav	Indian National Congress
1969	Uma Shanker	Indian National Congress
1974	Ganji Prasad	Bharatiya Kranti Dal
1977	Ganji Prasad	Janata Party
1980	Ramchandra Sharma	Indian National Congress (I)
1985	Ramchandra Sharma	Indian National Congress
1989	Ganji Prasad	Independent
1991	Chabbu Patel	Bharatiya Janata Party
1993	Chabbu Patel	Bharatiya Janata Party
1996	Chabbu Patel	Bharatiya Janata Party
2002	Ram Kishan Yadav	Samajwadi Party
2007	Ram Kishan Yadav	Samajwadi Party
2012	Babban Singh Chouhan	Bahujan Samaj Party
2017	Sadhana Singh	Bharatiya Janata Party
2022	Ramesh Jaiswal	Bharatiya Janata Party

== Election results ==
=== 2027 ===
2027 Uttar Pradesh Legislative Assembly election: Mughalsarai
Party	Candidate	Votes	%	±%
INDIA				
NDA				
BSP				
NOTA	None of the above			
Majority				
Turnout				
gain from		Swing		

=== 2022 ===
2022 Uttar Pradesh Legislative Assembly election: Mughalsarai
Party	Candidate	Votes	%	±%
BJP	Ramesh Jaiswal	102,216	42.4	+4.83
SP	Chandra Sekhar Yadav	87,295	36.21	+4.33
BSP	Irshad Ahmad (Bablu)	31,602	13.11	−11.49
INC	Chhabbu Patel	5,344	2.22	
AIMIM	Abid Ali	4,677	1.94	
VIP	Shailesh Kumar	4,079	1.69	
NOTA	None of the above	1,700	0.71	−0.14
Majority		14,921	6.19	+0.5
Turnout		241,076	60.14	−1.63
BJP hold		Swing		

=== 2017 ===
2017 Uttar Pradesh Legislative Assembly Election: Mughalsarai
Party	Candidate	Votes	%	±%
BJP	Sadhana Singh	87,401	37.57	
SP	Babulal	74,158	31.88	
BSP	Tilak Dhari	57,219	24.6	
Pragatisheel Manav Samaj Party	Babban	7,811	3.36	
NOTA	None of the above	1,950	0.85	
Majority		13,243	5.69	
Turnout		232,617	61.77	
