= Khakhara =

Coordinates: 25°06′N 83°07′E

Khakhara or Khkhra is a village in Sahabganj, Chandauli, Uttar Pradesh, India. Paddy and wheat are the main crops grown there.
