= Kailash Kharwar =

Member of Uttar Pradesh Legislative Assembly

Member of the Uttar Pradesh Legislative Assembly
- Incumbent
- Assumed office March 2022
- Preceded by: Sharada Prasad
- Constituency: Chakia

Personal details
- Born: 4 March 1960 (age 66) Bikapur, India
- Party: Bharatiya Janata Party
- Spouse: Chandravati Devi
- Children: 3
- Parent: Munnan (father)
- Education: Bachelor of Arts
- Alma mater: Govt LT College Varanasi
- Occupation: Politician, Teacher

Kailash Kharwar (born 4 March 1960) is an Indian politician, teacher, and a member of the 18th Uttar Pradesh Assembly from the Chakia Assembly constituency. He is a member of the Bharatiya Janta Party.

== Early life ==
Kailash Kharwar was born on 4 March 1960 in Bikapur, Uttar Pradesh, to a Hindu family of Munnan. He married Chandravati Devi on 25 May 1983, and they have three children.

== Education ==
He completed his education with a Bachelor of Arts at Govt LT College Varanasi in 1990.

== Posts held ==
#	From	To	Position	Comments
01	2022	Incumbent	Member, Uttar Pradesh Legislative Assembly	
