= Chandauli district =

District in Uttar Pradesh, India

Coordinates: 25.261344°N 83.264082°E

- District of Uttar Pradesh
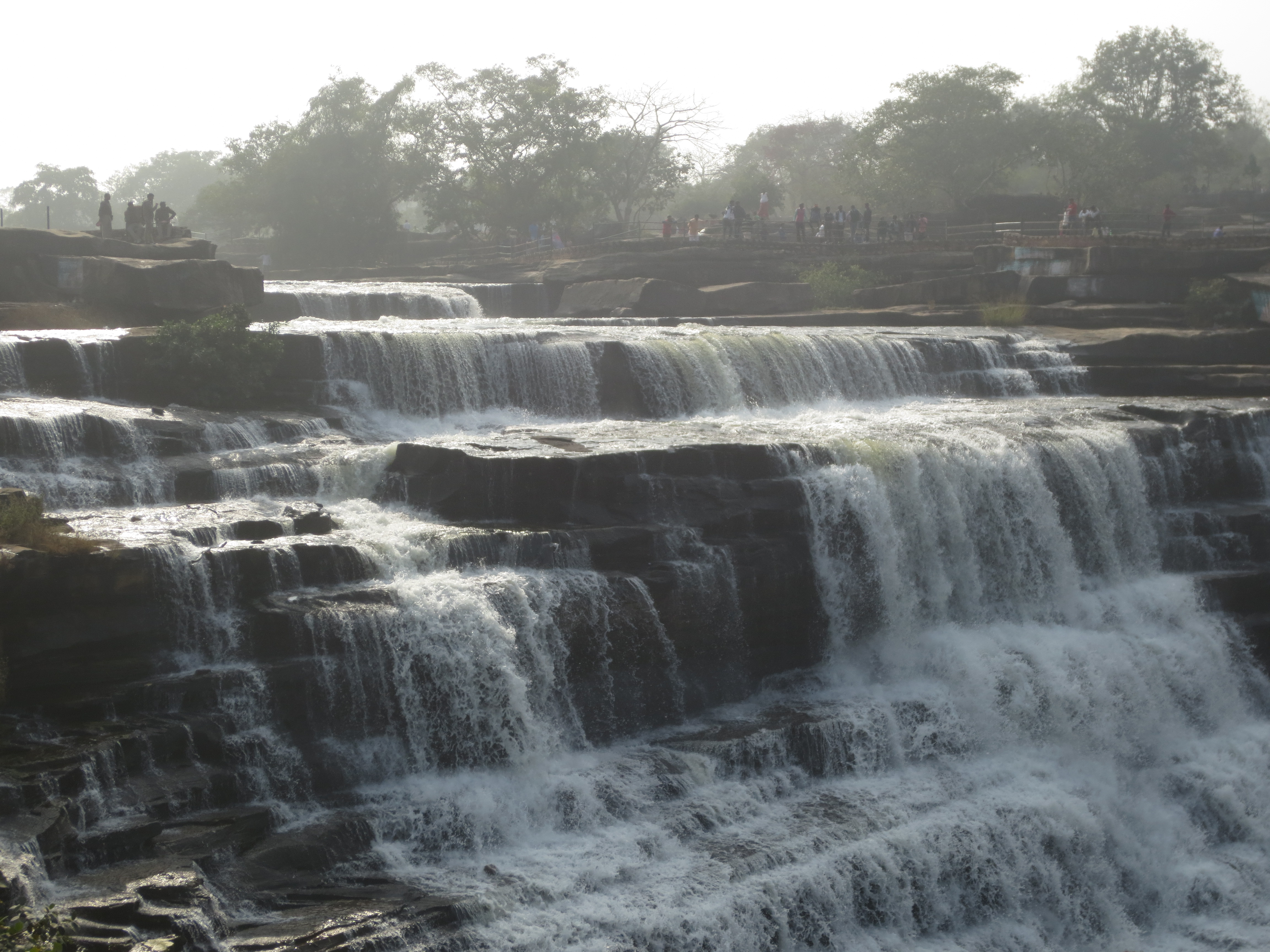
- Rajdari Waterfalls

- Location of Chandauli district in Uttar Pradesh
- Country: India
- State: Uttar Pradesh
- Division: Varanasi
- Established: 20 May 1997
- Headquarters: Chandauli

Government
  - District Magistrate: Sh. ChandraMohan Garg, IAS
  - Lok Sabha constituencies: Chandauli
  - Member of Parliament, Lok Sabha: Virendra Singh (Varanasi)

Area
  - Total: 2,484.70 km^{2} (959.35 sq mi)

Population (2011)
  - Total: 1,952,756
  - Density: 785.912/km^{2} (2,035.50/sq mi)
  - Urban: 242,553

Demographics
  - Literacy: 80.9%
  - Sex ratio: 984

Languages
  - Official language: Hindi
  - Additional official: Urdu
  - Regional: Bhojpuri
- Time zone: UTC+05:30 (IST)
- Vehicle registration: UP-67
- Website: chandauli.nic.in

Chandauli district is a district of Uttar Pradesh state of India, and Chandauli town is the district headquarters. Chandauli district, a part of Varanasi Division, became a separate district on 20 May 1997.Chandauli district is located in south eastern Uttar Pradesh.

Pt. Deen Dayal Upadhyay Nagar, a city in the district has the busiest railway station in the North East of Uttar Pradesh. The district includes the Chandraprabha (nature) Sanctuary and a number of waterfalls, including at Devdari and Rajdari. The District contributes to Indian GDP by providing the various cereals from the district including paddy and wheat. Popularly known as the "Dhaan Ka Katora of Uttar Pradesh" ("rice bowl of Uttar Pradesh") because of fertile lands of the Gangetic Plain. Chanduali district made big contributions at the time of freedom movements. In Chanduali there is a village named Ghoswan and Khakhara which is known for the protest against the British for the freedom of India. Chandauli district has its own railway station named Chandauli Majhwar railway station near to district headquarters.

The district has five Vidhan Sabha seats and one member of parliament seat.

== Economy ==
In 2006 the Ministry of Panchayati Raj named Chandauli one of the country's 250 most backward districts (out of a total of 640). It is one of the 34 districts in Uttar Pradesh currently receiving funds from the Backward Regions Grant Fund Programme (BRGF).

== Demographics ==
Historical population
Year	Pop.	±% p.a.
1901	354,167	—
1911	356,001	+0.05%
1921	361,609	+0.16%
1931	387,128	+0.68%
1941	459,271	+1.72%
1951	544,097	+1.71%
1961	659,347	+1.94%
1971	780,732	+1.70%
1981	1,001,246	+2.52%
1991	1,274,839	+2.45%
2001	1,643,251	+2.57%
2011	1,952,756	+1.74%

Religions in Chandauli district (2011)
Religion	Percent
Hinduism	88.48%
Islam	11.01%
Other or not stated	0.51%

According to the 2011 census Chandauli district has a population of 1,952,756, roughly equal to the nation of Lesotho or the US state of New Mexico. This gives it a ranking of 238th in India (out of a total of 640). The district has a population density of 768 inhabitants per square kilometre (1,990/sq mi). Its population growth rate over the decade 2001-2011 was 18.83%. Chandauli has a sex ratio of 913 females for every 1,000 males. 12.42% of the population lives in urban areas. Scheduled Castes and Scheduled Tribes make up 22.88% and 2.14% of the population respectively.

=== Languages ===
Languages in Chandauli district (2011)
1. Hindi (81.1%)
2. Bhojpuri (17.6%)
3. Urdu (1.16%)
4. Others (0.18%)

At the time of the 2011 Census of India, 81.06% of the population in the district spoke Hindi, 17.60% Bhojpuri and 1.16% Urdu as their first language.

Bhojpuri is the local language of Chandauli. The Bhojpuri variant of Kaithi is the indigenous script of Bhojpuri language.

== Administrative divisions ==
Chandauli district is divided into two main types of sub-district administrative units: tehsils and development blocks. These two units serve different purposes and function under separate departments.

=== Tehsil ===
Tehsils are the revenue and general administrative units in the district. They primarily handle land revenue administration, maintenance of land records, revenue collection, and magisterial duties.

Each tehsil is headed by a Sub-Divisional Magistrate (SDM), while revenue matters are managed by the Tehsildar and supporting staff such as Naib Tehsildar, Kanungo, and Lekhpal (Patwari).

Chandauli district has 5 tehsils:

No.	Code	Tehsil	No. of villages
1	00992	Sakaldiha	441
2	00993	Chandauli Sadar	386
3	00994	Chakia	480
4	01042	Mughalsarai	205
5	01053	Naugarh	112

=== Development Blocks ===
Development blocks are the basic units for rural development and panchayati raj activities. They are responsible for the implementation of various government schemes related to rural development, such as MGNREGA, PMAY, Swachh Bharat Mission, agriculture, health, and education.

Each development block is headed by a Block Development Officer (BDO), who works under the overall supervision of the Chief Development Officer (CDO) of the district.

Chandauli district has 9 development blocks:

No.	LGD Code	Block	No. of Gram Panchayat	No. of Villages
1	1615	Barahani	75	205
2	1616	Chahaniya	91	176
3	1617	Chakia	89	283
4	1618	Chandauli	88	183
5	1619	Dhanapur	84	138
6	1620	Naugarh	43	141
7	1621	Niyamtabad	88	137
8	1622	Sahabganj	72	188
9	1623	Sakaldiha	104	176

=== Municipal bodies ===
Urban areas in Chandauli district are governed by urban local bodies under the Urban Development Department of the Government of Uttar Pradesh. These bodies are responsible for urban planning, civic services, sanitation, water supply, street lighting, and other municipal functions.

These urban local bodies function as institutions of local self-government and are headed by an elected Chairperson (or Mayor in the case of the Nagar Palika), with day-to-day administration managed by an Executive Officer appointed by the state government.

The municipal bodies operate parallel to the rural development blocks and tehsils, covering the urban and semi-urban parts of the district.

No.	ULB Code	Name	Type	Population (2011)	No. wards	Lead Party (2023)
1	801227	Pt. Deen Dayal Upadhyay Nagar (Mughalsarai)	Nagar Palika Parishad	1,09,650	25	Independent; Sonu Kinnar (SC Woman Reserved)
2	801229	Chandauli	Nagar Panchayat	23,020	10	Independent; Sunil
3	801231	Chakia	Nagar Panchayat	17,356	12	BJP; Gaurav Kumar
4	801230	Saiyadraja (Saiyad Raja)	Nagar Panchayat	18,315	13	BJP; Rita Devi (OBC Woman reserved)

== Politics ==
Chandauli district falls under two Lok Sabha (Parliamentary) constituencies. Three assembly segments of the district are part of the Chandauli Lok Sabha constituency, whereas the Chakia assembly segment is included in the Robertsganj Lok Sabha constituency, which is reserved for Scheduled Castes (SC).

=== Parliamentary constituencies ===
No	Name	MP	Member	Party	2024 Lead
76	Chandauli	Virendra Singh		Samajwadi Party	Samajwadi Party
80	Robertsganj	Chhotelal Kharwar		Samajwadi Party	Samajwadi Party

=== Assembly constituencies ===
No	Name	MLA	Member	Party	2022 Lead
380	Mughalsarai	Ramesh Jaiswal		Bharatiya Janata Party	Bhartiya Janata Party
381	Sakaldiha	Prabhunarayan Yadav		Samajwadi Party	Samajwadi Party
382	Saiyadraja	Sushil Singh		Bharatiya Janata Party	Bharatiya Janata Party
383	Chakia	Kailash Kharwar		Bharatiya Janata Party	Bharatiya Janata Party

== Notable people ==
- Baba Keenaram, Aghori ascetic believed to be the originator of the Aghori sect of Shaivism.
- Lal Bahadur Shastri, Ex-Prime Minister of India born in Mughalsarai.
- Rajnath Singh, current Defence Minister of India, former Home Minister of India & Ex-Chief Minister of Uttar Pradesh, born in Bhabhaura, a small village in Chandauli District.
- Sadhana Singh Rajya Sabha MP
- Prabhunarayan Yadav MLA Sakaldiha
- Ramkishun Yadav, Ex-Member of Parliament Chandauli

== Geographical indication ==
Adamchini Chawal was awarded the Geographical Indication (GI) status tag from the Geographical Indications Registry, under the Union Government of India, on 22 February 2023 (valid till 3 November 2030).

M/s. Ishani Agro Producer Company Limited, & Human Welfare Association from Chandauli, proposed the GI registration of Adamchini Chawal. After filing the application in November 2020, the rice was granted the GI tag in 2023 by the Geographical Indication Registry in Chennai, making the name "Adamchini Chawal " exclusive to the rice grown in the region. It thus became the second rice variety from Uttar Pradesh after Kalanamak rice and the 37th type of goods from Uttar Pradesh to earn the GI tag.

The GI tag protects the rice from illegal selling and marketing, and gives it legal protection and a unique identity.
