= Chandauli =

Chandauli Chandoli
- Town
- Location in Uttar Pradesh, India
- Coordinates: 25.27°N 83.27°E
- Country: India
- State: Uttar Pradesh
- District: Chandauli

Area
  - Total: 2,484.70 km^{2} (959.35 sq mi)
- Elevation: 70 m (230 ft)

Population (2011)
  - Total: 23,020
  - Density: 9.265/km^{2} (24.00/sq mi)

Languages
  - Official: Hindi
  - Additional official: Urdu
  - Regional: Bhojpuri
- Time zone: UTC+5:30 (IST)
- PIN: 232104
- Vehicle registration: UP-67
- Website: www.chandauli.nic.in

Chandauli is a town and a nagar panchayat in Chandauli district in the state of Uttar Pradesh, India. It is the administrative headquarters of Chandauli District.

== Geography ==
Chandauli is located at 25.27°N 83.27°E. It has an average elevation of 70 metres (230 ft). Located about 30 kilometers from Varanasi, it comes under Varanasi division of Uttar Pradesh. Mughalsarai, a major railway junction between northern and eastern India is located in Chandauli district. It is served by Chandauli Majhwar railway station. Bihar districts border start from its eastern side. NH 19 passes from Chandauli district.

== Notable people ==
- Baba Keenaram, Aghori ascetic believed to be the originator of the Aghori sect of Shaivism.
- Lal Bahadur Shastri, birthplace in Mughalsarai.
- Rajnath Singh, current Defense Minister of India and former Home Minister of India, born in Bhabhaura, a small village in Chandauli District.

== Distance of Chandauli from important cities ==
- Varanasi – 30 km
- Prayagraj – 155 km
- Gwalior – 623 km
- Lucknow- 320 km
- Kanpur – 350 km
- Ghazipur – 50 km
- Mirzapur – 80 km
- Jaunpur – 90 km
- Azamgarh – 125 km
- Gorakhpur – 210 km
- Patna – 230 km
- Gaya – 230 km
- Ranchi – 400 km
- Jharsuguda – 824 km
- New Delhi – 810 km
- Kolkata – 670 km
- Madhupur Sonbhadra – 85 km
- Parasi Kalan – 15 km
- Mahadeur- 9 km
