= List of people from Varanasi =

Notable people from Indian city Varanasi

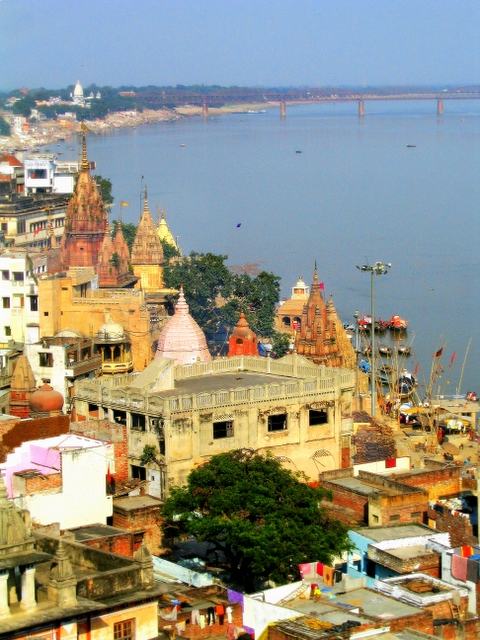
Varanasi on the banks of the holy Ganges River

This is a list of notable people from Varanasi, a city in Uttar Pradesh, India.

== Saints ==
- Kabir Das
- Lahiri Mahasaya, yogi
- Ravidas
- Tulsidas

== Activists ==
- Annie Besant
- Dyal Singh Majithia

== The arts, including music and entertainment ==
- Rasoolan Bai, singer
- Ashutosh Bhattacharya (1917–2004), tabla player
- Ekta Chowdhry, model
- Girija Devi, singer; Padma Vibhushan recipient
- Siddheshwari Devi, khayal singer; Padma Shri recipient
- Sitara Devi, actress, dancer and actress; Padma Shri recipient
- Bismillah Khan, shehnai player; Bharat Ratna and Padma Vibhushan recipient
- Sujit Kumar, actor and producer
- Anant Lal, Indian classical musician and teacher
- Birju Maharaj, Kathak guru; Padma Vibhushan recipient
- Kishan Maharaj, tabla player; Padma Vibhushan recipient
- Vikash Maharaj, sarod player; Yash Bharati recipient
- Ronu Majumdar, flautist
- Channulal Mishra, Hindustani classical player; Padma Bhushan recipient
- Prabhash Maharaj, Tabla player; shiromani recipient
- Deobrat Mishra, sitarist, surbaharist
- Shivnath Mishra, sitarist, surbaharist
- Lalmani Misra, musician
- Hemanta Mukherjee, singer, music director and film director
- Sameer, lyricist
- Ritwik Sanyal, singer, Dhrupad
- Ravi Shankar, sitarist; Bharat Ratna recipient
- Uday Shankar, dancer; Padma Vibhushan recipient
- Rachit Singh, Indian actor and acting coach
- Vidisha, actress
- Hiralal Yadav, folk dinger; Padma Shri recipient

== Scholar and writer ==
- Bimla Poddar
- Sitaram Chaturvedi, educator, dramatist and scholar
- Manmath Nath Gupta, revolutionary and writer

== Literature and academics ==
- Bedhab Banarasi, Hindi writer
- Kabir Das, mystic Bhojpuri poet and saint
- Ashok Dhawan, MLA, Uttar Pradesh
- Sudama Panday 'Dhoomil', poet
- Deviprasad Dwivedi, writer and teacher, Padma Bhushan recipient
- Shiv Prasad Gupta, freedom fighter, philanthropist and founder of Kashi Vidyapeeth
- Bharatendu Harishchandra, novelist, poet, playwright
- Gopinath Kaviraj (1887–1976), Sanskrit scholar; principal, Government Sanskrit College, Varanasi (1923–1937); Padma Vibhushan (1964)
- Devaki Nandan Khatri, writer
- Shiv Prasad Mishra, writer
- Veer Bhadra Mishra, founding president of the Sankat Mochan Foundation; former professor and HOD of civil engineering at IIT (BHU), Varanasi
- Premendra Mitra, Bengali poet and novelist
- Jaishankar Prasad, writer
- Premchand, Hindi-Urdu writer
- Ravidas, mystic saint and poet
- Vagish Shastri, Sanskrit scholar, tantric, linguist and grammarian
- Charu Sheel Singh, writer
- Kashi Nath Singh, writer
- Namvar Singh, literary critic, Sahitya Akademi winner
- Shiv Prasaad Singh, writer
- Teg Ali Teg, Bhojpuri writer and poet
- Harihar Kripalu Tripathi, Sanskrit scholar, Padma Bhushan recipient
- Tulsidas, saint and poet, and philosopher
- Baldev Upadhyaya, Hindi, Sanskrit scholar, literary historian, essayist and critic, Padma Bhushan recipient

== National and International Award winners ==
=== Bharat Ratna ===
- Bhagwan Das, Bharat Ratna
- Bismillah Khan, Bharat Ratna
- Ravi Shankar

=== Padma Vibhushan ===
- Rai Krishnadasa, Padma Vibhushan
- K. L. Shrimali, Padma Vibhushan
- Birju Maharaj, Kathak guru; Padma Vibhushan recipient
- Kishan Maharaj, tabla player; Padma Vibhushan recipient
- Channulal Mishra, Hindustani classical player; Padma Bhushan recipient

=== Padma Bhusan ===
- Deviprasad Dwivedi, writer and teacher, Padma Bhushan
- Gopinath Kaviraj (1887–1976), Sanskrit scholar; principal, Government Sanskrit College, Varanasi (1923–1937); Padma Vibhushan (1964)
- Harihar Kripalu Tripathi, Sanskrit scholar, Padma Bhushan
- Uday Shankar, dancer; Padma Vibhushan recipient
- Baldev Upadhyaya, Hindi, Sanskrit scholar, literary historian, essayist and critic, Padma Bhushan

=== Padma Shri ===
- Siddheshwari Devi, khayal singer; Padma Shri recipient
- Sitara Devi, actress, dancer and actress; Padma Shri recipient
- Shamta Prasad (Gudai Maharaj), tabla player; Padma Shri recipient
- Hiralal Yadav, folk dinger; Padma Shri recipient
- Kamalakar Tripathi, Indian physician and Former Professor in the Department of Medicine, BHU Institute of Medical Sciences.[1][2] He has been the Head of Nephrology Department.
- Ajita Srivastava, Indian singer, educationist and a social worker. Srivastava is known for popularizing and promoting the Kajari folk songs.
- Bismillah Khan
- Bimla Poddar, Indian social worker, businessperson, philanthropist and the founder of Jnana Pravaha

=== Arjuna Award ===
- Narsingh Yadav, Wrestler

== Holders of High Offices ==
=== Prime Minister of India ===
- Lal Bahadur Shastri, ex-Prime Minister of India

=== Chief Minister of Uttar Pradesh ===
- Sampurnanand, former chief minister of Uttar Pradesh and former governor of Rajasthan
- Tribhuvan Narain Singh, former chief minister of Uttar Pradesh
- Kamalapati Tripathi, writer, freedom fighter, former chief minister of Uttar Pradesh, and former railway minister

=== Governor of states ===
- Lakshman Prasad Acharya, governor of Assam
- Devendra Nath Dwivedi, former governor of Gujarat
- Sri Prakasa, former governor of Assam
- Sampurnanand, former governor of Rajasthan

== Politics ==
=== MP of Varanasi ===
- Shankar Prasad Jaiswal, former MP of Varanasi
- Anil Shastri, former MP of Varanasi
- Raghunath Singh, first MP of Varanasi

=== MP of other constituency ===
- Jawahar Lal Jaiswal, former MP Chandauli
- Ananda Ratna Maurya, former MP Chandauli
- Sudhakar Pandey, former MP Chandauli
- Virendra Singh, MP Chandauli
- Kailash Nath Yadav former MP Chandauli

=== Other ===
- Sachindra Nath Bakshi, former MLA Varanasi South
- Harish Chandra Srivastava, former minister in the Government of Uttar Pradesh

== Rulers ==
=== Freedom Fighter ===
- Balwant Singh of Benares (1711–1770), Maharaja of Benares State 1740–1770
- Raja Chait Singh Maharaja of Benaras
- Kashi Naresh Maharaja Banaras Vibhuti Narayan Singh
- Maharani Kiran Rao, Queen of Bhopal
- Maharani Lakshmibai, Queen of Jhansi
- Raj Narain

== Scientists ==
- Arvind Mohan Kayastha, biologist
- Bishun Khare, research scientist
- Subhash Chandra Lakhotia, cytogenetist and biologist
- Sanjaya Rajaram, plant biologist
- Sushruta, Ancient Indian physician and surgeon

== Sports ==
=== Basketball ===
- Vishesh Bhriguvanshi, basketball player
- Akanksha Singh, basketball player
- Divya Singh, basketball player
- Prashanti Singh, basketball player
- Pratima Singh, basketball player

=== Cricket ===
- Bernard Brodhurst, cricketer
- Maharajkumar of Vizianagram, cricketer

=== Hockey ===
- Mohammed Shahid, field hockey player
- Lalit Upadhyay, field hockey player

=== Other ===
- Shivpal Singh, track and field athlete
- Narsingh Pancham Yadav, wrestler
- Punam Yadav, weightlifter
- Ram Singh Yadav, marathon runner

== Others ==
- Sir James Brooke, founder of the White Rajah dynasty of Sarawak
- Sitaram Chaturvedi, educator, dramatist and scholar
- Ekta Chowdhry, model
- Bhagwan Das, Bharat Ratna recipient
- Manmath Nath Gupta, revolutionary and writer
- Rai Krishnadasa, Padma Vibhushan recipient
- Lahiri Mahasaya, yogi
- Arun Pathak, activist and politician
- Ravidas
- Sameer, lyricist
- Sachindra Nath Sanyal, revolutionary and founder of the Hindustan Republican Association
- K. L. Shrimali, Padma Vibhushan
