= Kshetresa Chandra Chattopadhyaya =

Sanskrit scholar

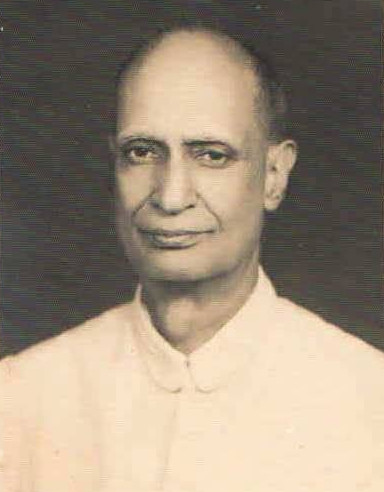

Kshetresa Chandra Chattopadhyaya (1896–1974) was a distinguished scholar of Sanskrit from India. A scholar of Sanskrit, Veda, grammar, Pali, Prakrit and philology, he was born on 27 October 1896 in village Nimta of North 24 Parganas in what was then Bengal. He came from an illustrious family of Kulina Brahmans of Deshmukho in District Hooghly. The Indian writer Bankim Chandra Chattopadhyay belonged to the same family and Kshetresa Chandra Chattopadhyaya inherited the spirit of Indian renaissance from him.

== Education ==
Chattopadhyaya studied in a number of schools and passed the matriculation examination of the Calcutta University in 1913 from Hindu School of Calcutta. He then attended the Presidency College, Calcutta for Intermediate examination and passed in 1915. He then migrated to the United Province of Agra and Oudh and passed the B.A. examination of Allahabad University (1917) and M.A. in Sanskrit from Queen's College, Benares (1919). He also passed the M.A. Examination in Veda from Calcutta University in 1921 and Vedant in 1922. He in his college days became an intimate friend of Subhas Chandra Bose who later became a prominent figure in Indian politics and the Indian independence movement. Chattopadhyaya was a student of Dr. Ganganath Jha.

== Career ==
Chattopadhyaya joined University of Allahabad as a lecturer in the department of Sanskrit in 1924. In the year 1950 he was promoted to reader and from 1956 for about a couple of years he acted as professor of Sanskrit. Later he became Director, Research Institute at Sampurnanand Sanskrit University, Benares. As the director, he was in a position to guide research exclusively.

Chattopadhyaya was the editor of book series Sarasvati Bhavana Granthamala and famous Sanskrit Journal, Sarasvati Susama. He was also appointed as a special scholar for comparative study of Veda and Avesta by the Ministry of Education, Govt. of India at Kendriya Sanskrit Vidyapeeth, Tirupati. The Calcutta University appointed him Stephan's Nirmalendu Ghosh Lecturer on Comparative Religion in 1960 (In that period he was on leave from Sampurnanand Sanskrit University).

== Disciples ==
He has produced many scholars, among them are

1. B P T Vagish Shastri
2. Vidya Niwas Mishra
3. Govind Chandra Pande
4. Govardhan Rai
5. Kamlesh Dutt Tripathi

== Work ==
Chattopadhyaya had been actively connected with All India Oriental Conference since its third session held in Madras in December 1924. He presided over its Veda and Indo-Aryan section in the ninth session held at Trivandrum in 1937 and its Veda section in the eighteenth session held at Annamalainagar in 1955. He presided over the Philology section of Akhil Bhartiya Hindi Sahitya Sammelana held at Karachi in December 1946.

== Honor ==
Certificate of Merit, President of India, 1966.

== Book authored ==
1. Eshakenopanishad (First Edition 1916), Reprinted in University Bi-Centenary Series, (Ed. B.N. Mishra), Vol VIII, Sampurnanand Sanskrit University, 1992.
2. Vedavittaprakasika, 1966.
3. Studies in Vedic and Indo-Iranian Religion and Literature, (Ed.Vidya Niwas Mishra), 1976.
