= Gulab Khandelwal =

20th century poet (1924-2017)

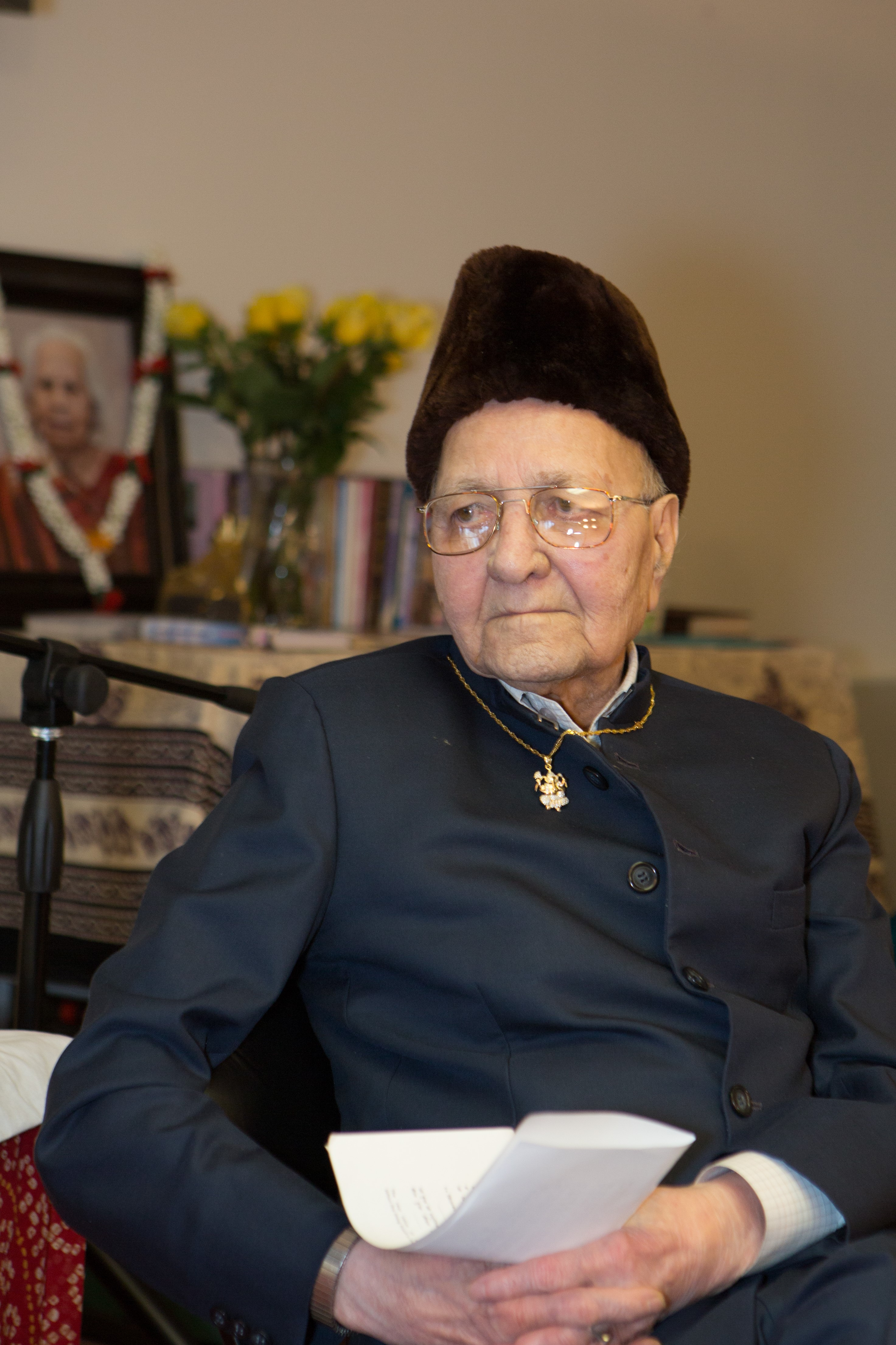
- Born: 21 February 1924; Nawalgarh, Rajputana Agency, British India
- Died: 2 July 2017 (aged 93); Medina, Ohio, U.S.
- Education: Banaras Hindu University
- Occupation: Poet
- Spouse: Krishna Devi
- Writing career
- Notable works: Usha, Sau Gulab Khile, Alok Vritt, Ahalya, Kach Devyani
- Website: Official website

Gulab Khandelwal (21 February 1924 – 2 July 2017) was an Indian poet who wrote poetry in different forms such as Lyrics, Sonnets, Rubais (Quatrains), Dohas (Couplets), Odes, Elegies, Lyrical Ballads, Epics, Poetic Dramas, Ghazals, and Masnavi. He even introduced some of these forms into Hindi literature and, apart from Hindi, has also written poetry in Urdu and English. The span of his poetic language touches upon Sanskrit on one end and Urdu on the other. Gulab Khandelwal died in Ohio on 2 July 2017.

== Education ==
Gulab Khandelwal was born in the town of Navalgarh, Rajasthan (India). He spent his childhood and received his early education at Gaya, Bihar. He received his undergraduate education at the Banaras Hindu University, graduating with a BA in 1943. While in Banaras, his inborn poetic faculty matured when he came into contact with the great luminaries of Hindi Literature. He met poets such as Suryakant Tripathi 'Nirala', Maithili Sharan Gupt, Ayodhya Prasad Upadhyay 'Hariaudh', Harivansh Rai Bachchan, and Bedhab Banarasi. He also met critics such as Pt. Ramchandra Shukla, Nand Dulare Bajpai, and Pt. Shrinarayan Chaturvedi. Further early influences include scholars such as Dr. Sampurnanand, Kamlapati Tripathi, and Sitaram Chaturvedi.

== Literary career ==
Gulab Khandelwal started writing poetry at an early age. His first volume of poems was published in 1941 with preface by the famous poet Suryakant Tripathi 'Nirala'. Since then, 73 books have been published, including more than 50 volumes of poems and 2 dramatic works in prose, some of which have been digitized by the Digital Library of India. Six of his books have received awards from the Uttar Pradesh government and one has received an award from the Bihar government. Some of his books were selected as textbooks for colleges in Uttar Pradesh and Bihar, with Alok Vritt used in the intermediate board in Uttar Pradesh, India, since 1976.

Mahakavi Gulab translated some of his poems in English in Gulab Khandelwal: Selected Poems, which was published in 1986 with preface by Dr. Karan Singh, ex-Prince of Kashmir. In recognition of this and his achievements in his literary career, he was awarded honorary citizenship of Baltimore City, USA on 13 July 1985. Furthermore, both the mayor of the City of Baltimore and the governor of Maryland state declared this day as Hindi Day.

Mahakavi Gulab was the president of Archana, a literary society of Kolkata founded in the 1950s, and presided over many events organized by multiple literary organizations. He was the president of Akhil Bhartiya Hindi Sahitya Sammelan, Prayag, for 18 years. He was also the president of Bharati Parishad, an organisation founded by Mahamana Madan Mohan Malaviya. For 15 years, he was the senior member of the editorial board of Vishwa, a literary magazine by the International Hindi Association. He was also the president of the International Hindi Association.

Mahakavi Gulab lived mostly in the USA, but visited India every year. Until his death, he was active in his literary pursuit. In addition to his involvement in the Indian literary organizations, he also worked extensively with Indian organizations in the United States. He presided on meetings in New York on Vishwa Hindi Sammelan, an organization which strives towards the firm establishment of the Hindi language. At the age of 82, he wrote his auto-biography ज़िन्दगी है कोई किताब नहीं (Zindagi Hai Koi Kitaab Nahi).

== Awards ==
Some of his books were presented awards by Hindi Sansthan (U.P. Government), India

1. Usha – by U.P. Government in 1967
2. Roop Ki Dhoop – by U.P. Government in 1971
3. Sau Gulab Khile – by U.P. Government in 1975
4. Kuchh Aur Gulab – by U.P. Government in 1980
5. Ahalya – Vishisht Puraskar by U.P. Government in 1980
6. Har Subah Ek Taza Gulab – Nirala Puraskar by U.P. Government in 1989
7. Adhunik Kavi-19 – Akhil Bharatiya Granth Puraskar by Bihar Government
8. Ahalya – Akhil Bharatiya Rambhakti Puraskar by Hanuman Mandir Trust, Kolkata, 1984

Some of his books were selected as textbooks for colleges:

1. Kach Devyani – Had been in Intermediate in Magadh University, Bihar (India)
2. Usha (Mahakavya) – Had been in B.A. in Magadh University, Bihar (India)
3. Ahalya (Khand-kavya)' – Had been subject for dissertation in Awadh University, U.P. (India)
4. Ahalya (Khand-kavya) – Had been in B.A. in Magadh University, Bihar (India)
5. Alok-Vritt (Khand-kavya) – Had been in B.A. in Magadh University, Bihar (India)
6. Alok-Vritt (Khand-kavya) – Is in Intermediate Board in Uttar Pradesh (India) since 1976

== Research ==
A Dissertation For M.A. was presented by Mukul Khandelwal under the guidance of Shri Shyam Nandan Singh in 1978 from Magadh University and two dissertations were presented under the guidance of Shri Hans Raj Tripathi from Awadh University. Degree of Ph. D has been awarded to the following persons on his literature:

1. Sagar University, Madhya Pradesh to Yashvant Singh in 1966 (Hindi Ke Vaad-Mukt Kavi)
2. Magadh University, Bihar to Ravindra Roy in 1985 (Gulab Khandelwal : Vyaktitva Aur Krititva)
3. Meerut University, U.P. to Vishnu Prakash Mishra in 1992 (Gulab Khandelwal : Jeevan Aur Sahitya)
4. Ruhelkhand University, U.P. to Poorti Avasthi in 1994 (Kavi Gulab Khandelwal Ke Sahitya Ka Alochnatmak Adhyayan)
5. Mahatma Jyotiba Phule University, U.P. to Sneh Kumari Kanojiya in 2006 (Gulab Khandelwal Ke Kavya Ka ManoVaigyanik Adhyayan)
6. Kurukshetra University, Haryana to Raj Yadav Under the guidance of Shri Ramapati Singh in 2006
7. Awadh University, Faizabad, U.P. to Ankita Mishra in 2011 (Kavi Gulab Ki Kavya Drishti)
8. Nagpur University, Maharashtra to Monika Vishnoi in 2021 (Mahakavi Gulab Khandelwal Ki Kavya Bhasha Aur Shilp Vidhan)
9. Sikar University, Rajasthan, to Rakesh Kumar Gujarniya in 2022 (Gulab Khandelwal Ke Kavya Mein Rashtriya Chetna Ki Abhivyakti)

== Recognition ==
US and Canada

1. Gulab Khandelwal was awarded the Honorary Citizenship of Baltimore City (USA) on 13 July 1985 "for his achievements and eminent gifts to our times." This day was declared as Hindi Day in the entire state by the Governor of Maryland. The Mayor of Baltimore also declared this day as Hindi Day in the City of Baltimore.
2. He was awarded the Vishisht Samman (Special Literary Award) by the Antar Rashtriya Hindi Samiti, Washington D.C. (USA) on 6 December 1986.
3. On Republic Day celebration of India, 2006, he was honoured and the title of 'Kavi Samrat' was bestowed upon him by the Governor of Maryland, USA.
4. He has been honoured by Hindi Parishad Toronto and Edmonton (Canada) and has been honoured by numerous literary and non-literary institutions in India and USA.
5. The Mahakavi Gulab Khandelwal Smriti Scholarship was hosted by the Institute for South Asia Studies at University of California, Berkeley in 2018, in support of research in Hindi literature. The $2000 award was given to Anirudh Karnick (a PhD student in Comparative Literature and Literary Theory at the University of Pennsylvania) in April 2019.

India

1. Gulabji was felicitated by Uttar Pradesh Hindi Sahitya Sammelan in 1979.
2. He was conferred the highest honour of Sahitya Vachaspati (equivalent to the degree of PhD), by Akhil Bharatiya Hindi Sahitya Sammelan, under the president-ship of Padma Bhushan Dr. Ramkumar Verma, in 1989.
3. His two books – Bhakti-Ganga and Tilak Kare Raghubeer, were released by the President of India, honourable Shri Shankar Dayal Sharma in 1997.
4. He was felicitated jointly by the then Governor of U. P. Shri Vishnu Kant Shastri, Ex Chief Minister of U. P. Shri Mulayam Singh Yadav, Pujya Morari Bapu, and Ex Attorney General Shri Shanti Bhushan in Etawah, U.P, in 2001.

== Music ==
Gulab Ji's Bhakti Geet and Ghazals are sung by many artists in India as well as the USA.

== Works ==
Works of Gulab Khandelwal

Serial number	Name of Book	Name in Hindi	Writing Period	Genre
1	Kavita	कविता	1939–41	Poems & Songs
2	Anbindhe Moti	अनबिंधे मोती	1939–83	Poems & Songs
3	Chandni	चाँदनी	1940–44	Songs
4	Usar Ka Phool	ऊसर का फूल	1940–50	Poems & Songs
5	Nupur Bandhe Charan	नूपुर बँधे चरण	1940–51	Poems & Songs
6	Seepi Rachit Ret	सीपी-रचित रेत	1941–46	Sonnet
7	Prem Kalindi	प्रेम-कालिन्दी	1941–77	Songs
8	Shabdon Se Pare	शब्दों से परे	1941–82	Poems & Songs
9	Adhunik Kavi – 19 Gulab Khandelwal	आधुनिक कवि – १९, गुलाब खंडेलवाल	1941–84	Mixed Genre
10	Prem Vina	प्रेम-वीणा	1941–96	Poems & Songs
11	Antah Salila	अन्तःसलिला	1941–96	Muktak, Poems & Songs
12	Desh Virana Hai	देश विराना है	1941–97	Poems & Songs
13	Bali Nirvas	बलि-निर्वास	1943	Mixed Genre
14	Bhavon Ka Rajkumar	भावों का राजकुमार	1943–97	Poems & Songs
15	Kach Devyani	कच-देवयानी	1944–45	Small Epic
16	Usha	उषा	1945–47	Epic
17	Chandan Ki kalam Shahad Mein Dubo Dubo kar	चन्दन की कलम शहद में डुबो-डुबोकर	1947–83	Poems
18	Gandhi Bharati	गाँधी भारती	1948	Sonnet
19	Kaljayee	कालजयी	1948–2006	Muktak, Poems & Songs
20	Ahalya	अहल्या	1948–50	Small Epic
21	Bhool	भूल	1949	Drama
22	Aayu Banee Prastavana	आयु बनी प्रस्तावना	1949–71	Songs
23	Meri Urdu Ghazalen	मेरी उर्दू ग़ज़लें	1950–55	Ghazal
24	Roop Ki Dhoop	रूप की धूप	1960–70	Rubayi, Muktak & Couplets
25	RajRajeshwar Ashok	राजराजेश्वर अशोक	1961	Drama
26	Bikhare Phool	बिखरे फूल	1961–96	Songs
27	Mere Bharat Mere Swadesh	मेरे भारत, मेरे स्वदेश	1962	Patriotic Songs & Couplets
28	Kumkum Ke Chhinte	कुमकुम के छींटे	1965–70	Poems
29	Alok Vritt	आलोकवृत्त	1968–73	Small Epic
30	Sau Gulab Khile	सौ गुलाब खिले	1970–73	Ghazal
31	Pankhuriyan Gulab Ki	पँखुरियाँ गुलाबकी	1973–74	Ghazal
32	Kuchh Aur Gulab	कुछ और गुलाब	1977–80	Ghazal
33	Har Subah Ek Taza Gulab	हर सुबह एक ताज़ा गुलाब	1978–81	Ghazal
34	Naye Prabhat Ki Angdaiyiyan	नये प्रभात की अँगड़ाइयाँ	1980–83	Poems
35	Vyakti Ban Kar Aa	व्यक्ति बनकर आ	1981–82	Poems
36	Boonde Jo Moti Ban Gayee	बूँदें जो मोती बन गयीं	1981–82	Muktak
37		Gulab Khandelwal – Selected Poems	1983	Poems
38	Kasturi Kundal Base	कस्तूरी कुंडल बसे	1983– 84	Muktak
39	Ret Par Chamakti Maniyan	रेत पर चमकती मणियाँ	1983– 84	Poems
40	Ek Chandrabimb Thahra Huwa	एक चन्द्रबिम्ब ठहरा हुआ	1983– 84	Poems
41	Sab Kuchh Krishnarpanam	सब कुछ कृष्णार्पणम्‌	1983–85	Devotional Songs
42	Bhakti Ganga	भक्ति-गंगा	1983–97	Devotional Songs
43	Hum To Gaa Kar Mukt Huye	हम तो गा कर मुक्त हुये	1986–87	Songs
44	Kitne Jivan Kitni Baar	कितने जीवन, कितनी बार	1988	Songs
45	Nao Sindhi Mein Chhodi	नाव सिन्धु में छोड़ी	1991	Songs
46	Geet-Vrindavan	गीत-वृन्दावन	1991	Songs
47	Sita-Vanvaas	सीता-वनवास	1991–92	Songs
48	Tilak Kare Raghuvir	तिलक करें रघुबीर	1991–92	Devotional Songs
49	Geet Ratnavali	गीत रत्नावली	1991–99	Songs
50	Karuna Triveni	करुणा-त्रिवेणी (गीत-वृन्दावन, सीता-वनवास, गीत रत्नावली)	1991–99	Songs
51	Prit Na Kariyo Koi	प्रीत न करियो कोय	1994	Masnavi
52	Nahin Viram Liya Hai	नहीं विराम लिया है	1998–99	Songs
53	Tujhe Paya Apne Ko Kho Kar	तुझे पाया अपने को खोकर	1999–2000	Songs
54	Diya Jag Ko Tujhse Jo Paya	दिया जग को तुझसे जो पाया (इसमें 'देहली का पत्थर' तथा 'पत्र-पुष्प' भी सम्मिलित है)	2000–03	Songs
55	Mere Geet Tumhara Swar Ho	मेरे गीत तुम्हारा स्वर हो	2005–06	Songs
56	Jyon Ki Tyon Dhar Deeni Chadariya	ज्यों की त्यों धर दीनी चदरिया	2007–08	Songs
57	Kagaz Ki Naao	कागज की नाव	2008	Poems & Songs
58	Zindagi Hai Koi Kitaab Nahin	ज़िन्दगी है कोई किताब नहीं	2008	Autobiography
59		The Evening Rose	2008–09	Poems
60	Gulab Granthavali Volume 1 Part 1	गुलाब ग्रन्थावली (परिवर्धित संस्करण) खंड एक, भाग एक	1941–2000	Poems & Songs
61	Gulab Granthavali Volume 1 Part 2	गुलाब ग्रन्थावली (परिवर्धित संस्करण) खंड एक, भाग दो	1983–2000	Songs
62	Gulab Granthavali Volume 2	गुलाब ग्रन्थावली (परिवर्धित संस्करण) खंड दो	1983–2000	Poems & Songs
63	Gulab Granthavali Volume 3	गुलाब ग्रन्थावली (परिवर्धित संस्करण) खंड तीन	1941–2000	Sonnet, Couplets, Songs & Ghazals
64	Gulab Granthavali Volume 4	गुलाब ग्रन्थावली (परिवर्धित संस्करण) खंड चार	1941–2000	Epic, Small Epic & Masnavi
65	Gulab Granthavali Volume 5	गुलाब ग्रन्थावली (परिवर्धित संस्करण) खंड पांच	1939–2010	Poems, Songs English Poems & Urdu Ghazals
66	Gulab Granthavali Volume 6	गुलाब ग्रन्थावली (परिवर्धित संस्करण) खंड छः	1949–2011	Songs, Drama & English Poems
67	Har Moti Me Sagar Lahre	हर मोती में सागर लहरे	2013-2015	
68	Hansa To Moti Chuge	हंसा तो मोती चुगे		
69	Guliver Ki Chauthi Yatra	गुलिवर की चौथी यात्रा		
70	Mahakavi Gulab Khandelwal - Chuni Hui Rachnaye	महाकवि गुलाब खंडेलवाल चुनी हुई रचनाएँ		
71	Mahakavi Gulab Khandelwal - Chuni Hui Rachnaye-2	महाकवि गुलाब खंडेलवाल चुनी हुई रचनाएँ -2		
72	Ravindranath:Hindi Ke Darpan Me	रवींद्रनाथ:हिंदी के दर्पण में		
73	Gulab Khandelwal : Sahityakaro ki Drishti Me	गुलाब खंडेलवाल : साहित्यकारों की दृष्टि में		
