= Varanasi in literature =

Varanasi is a city that the Hindus all over the world consider as a holy city and a place of pilgrimage. The centrality of this city in the Hindu worldview has a direct bearing upon its presence in various forms of literature, either directly upon the city itself, or having the city in a kind of central role. Many literary works mention Varanasi occasionally, but that will not be called city literature. The literary presence of the city of Varanasi or Kashi, as it is invariably called in Sanskrit literature, can be conveniently understood by looking at the city literature divided into three groups, based on its language: Sanskrit, Hindi and English.

== Varanasi in Sanskrit literature ==
Varanasi or Kashi is present in various Puranas, praised as the holiest of the holy cities. The most notable example of one such purana is Skandmahapuran that has one large book with one hundred chapters on Varanasi. The section is called the Kashi Khanda or section. Kashi Khanda is a long narrative in verse that praises the city and its sacred locations. In addition to the puranas there are various compendiums on places of pilgrimage that keep praising the three tirthas: Kashi, Prayag (Allahabad) and Gaya. Pandit Jagannath's Gangalahari was composed in Sanskrit in Varanasi and praises the holy Ganga that flows through the city. Many of the Jataka Tales begin as,'Long time ago, in the city of Kashi...'. That shows the importance of the city in national life, and explained its presence in literature.

Shiva Samhita chapter 5, verse number 100, reads as The two vessels called the Idã and pingalã are the real "Varana" and "Asi" the space between them is called vârânasi(Benares, the holy city of siva). There it is said that the vishwanâtha (the loard of universe) dwells

== Varanasi in Hindi-Urdu literature ==
From the origin of Hindi literature, or poetry, as prose came later, Varanasi had a role to play in its development. The first great Hindi (in the Awadhi dialect) poet to write in praise of Varanasi was Goswami Tulsidas. He wrote a long panegyric of the city: 'Why won't one praise the city of Kashi where dwell Shiva and his consort?'. Varanasi was the birthplace of modern Hindi literature and language, because Bhartendu Harishchandra, the father of the khadi boli dialect, that was later standardized into Hindi of modern usage, dominated the literary scene throughout his active life span. He wrote beautifully on his city both in prose and verse. A special mention must be made of his play: Premjogini that is not only set in the city, but makes the city its protagonist. After Bhartendu came Munshi Premchand. His stories and many of his novels are set in the city of Varanasi and give it a lot of importance. Shiv Prasad Mishra, Kashi Nath Singh and Shiv Prasaad Singh are the three noteworthy writers who wrote short stories and novels centered on the city of Varanasi. Before 1947 there were many writers and poets in Varanasi who used to write in Urdu, e.g. Premchand. With time, the number of Urdu poets and writers went down. Nazeer Banarsi shines among those poets who wrote on Varanasi in Urdu.

== Varanasi in English literature ==
In comparison to literature in the other two languages, English literature has fewer works that give Varanasi the central position. Pankaj Mishra's The Romantics is a novel in which many chapters are set in the city of Varanasi. It succeeds in following the diurnal and seasonal rhythms of the city. Among the popular fiction writers, Amish Tripathi and Chetan Bhagat have used Varanasi in their novels: The Shiva Trilogy (one part) and Revolution 2020.

Mark Twain includes an amusing account of the city in his More Tramps Abroad, chapter 53-56 (Chatto and Windus, 1898).

Letitia Elizabeth Landon's poetical illustration, Benares, (1831), to a picture by W. Turner, represents the very negative view of the English in the early Nineteenth Century towards all the trappings of religious practice found in the city at that time. Elsewhere, Miss Landon is much more open-minded: compare her poetical illustration to Hindoo Temples at Benares, (1832), a painting by Thomas Shotter Boys, in which decay is generalised.

== Varanasi in Buddhism ==
According to the Buddhist narrative found within the Cakkavatti Sīhanāda Sutta, Varanasi will become the legendary domain of Ketumati during Maitreya's days.
