= Sārasvatī Suṣamā =

Sanskrit-language research journal

Sārasvatī Suṣamā (Sanskrit: सारस्वती सुषमा, lit. 'Quarterly Sanskrit Research Journal') is a research journal published in Sanskrit. Established in 1942 and published quarterly, the Sārasvatī Suṣamā has been edited by a series of distinguished scholars and has carried important and internationally recognized research on Sanskrit-related topics.

== Origin ==
Sārasvatī Suṣamā was initially published from Government Sanskrit College Benares in 1942. The editors were:

- Dr. Mangal Dev Shastri
- Tribhuvan Prasad Upadhyay
- Kubernath Shukla

== Reputation ==
During 1958, this college merged into Sampurnanand Sanskrit University. Thereafter the journal was published by the Director, Research Institute, Sampurnanand Sanskrit University, Varanasi, India.

== Editors ==
The editors of the journal since 1957 are listed below.

No.	Name of Editor	Period	No. of Years
1	Kshetresa Chandra Chattopadhyaya	1957–1965	8
2	Baldev Upadhyaya	1966–1968	2
3	Badarinath Shukla	1968–1970	2
4	B. P. T. Vagish Shastri	1970–1996	26
5	Adya Prasad Mishra	1996–1997	1
6	Shrikant Pandey	1997–1998	1
7	Rahas Bihari Dwivedi	1999–2000	1
8	Rajaram Shukla	2001–present	6

== Nature of publication ==
Sārasvatī Suṣamā publishes articles on the following topics.

- Research articles on oriental learnings.
- Research articles on Pali, Prakrit, Apabhramsa and Culture.
- Unpublished small manuscripts edited by scholars.
- Criticism of the books.
- Continuation work on Purana Index.
- Other treaties.
