= Sarasvati Bhavana Granthamala =

Series of Sanskrit scholarly texts

Sārasvati Bhavana Granthamala (previously known as Sarasvati Bhavana Texts) is a series of editions of Sanskrit scholarly texts. The publication of the series began in 1920, on behalf of Sarasvati Bhawan, the Library of the Government Sanskrit College, Varanasi. The series is known as The Princess of Wales Sārasvati Bhavana Texts. This project of publication was accepted because of requests by a Sir Buller, who was the education director of the United Provinces during British rule in India.

== Aim ==
The Sārasvati Bhavan library is the richest collection of Sanskrit manuscripts in India. Dr. Ganganath Jha suggested and recommended the publication of the rare manuscripts collected in this library. These manuscripts were written on palm leaves, clothes, birch, wooden plates and old paper. These texts had not been published for multiple years and would have faded into obscurity if not rescued by the Sarasvati Bhavan effort.

== Subjects ==
These manuscripts focused on different types of Sanskrit literature, such as the
1. Vedas
2. Nyāya
3. Mimāṃsā
4. Vyākaraṇa
5. Literature
6. Drama
7. Astrology
8. Dharmaśāstra
9. Puranas, etc.

== History ==
Sārasvati Bhavan texts have been published since 1920 by the Government Sanskrit College, Benares. In 1958 this college merged into the Sampurnanand Sanskrit University. This University established a Research Institute for the editing and publication of manuscript and comparative & critical research.

The director of the Research Institute was the editor of all publications and research activities done in the University. After independence, the title 'Princess of Wales' was removed from Sārasvati Bhavana Texts and renamed to "Sārasvati Bhavana Granthamala". In this series, more than 150 books have been published.

== Editors ==
S.No.	Name of Editor	Period
1.	Kshetresa Chandra Chattopadhyaya	1957–1965
2.	Baldev Upadhyaya	1966–1968
3.	Badarinath Shukla	1968–1970
4.	Dr. B.P.T. Vagish Shastri	1970–1991

Gopinath Kaviraj, the principal of the college from 1923 to 1937, was the supervising editor of the series. He received the Padma Vibhushan in 1964. In 1991, the responsibilities of the Granthamala were handed over by the Vice-Chancellors of the University to the supervision of the director of the Research Institute.

== Bibliography ==
- Gopinath Kaviraj, ed. (1934). The Nrisimha Prasada: Sraddha Sara of Sri Dalapatriraja (in Sanskrit). Vidya Vilas Press, Benaras.
- Gopinath Kaviraj, ed. (1924). Dakini Kavya (PDF) (in Sanskrit). Vidya Vilas Press, Benaras.
