= Baldev Upadhyaya =

Indian literature scholar (1899–1999)

- Born: 10 October 1899; Ballia, North-Western Provinces, British India
- Died: 10 August 1999 (aged 99); Varanasi, Uttar Pradesh, India
- Education: Banaras Hindu University
- Awards: Padma Bhushan

Baldev Upadhyaya (10 October 1899 – 10 August 1999) was a Hindi and Sanskrit scholar, literary historian, essayist and critic. He wrote numerous books, collections of essays and a historical outline of Sanskrit literature. He is noted for discussing Sanskrit literature in the Hindi language. Earlier books related to Sanskrit literature were often written either in Sanskrit or in English.

== Life ==
He was born on 10 October 1899 in the village Sonbarsa in the Ballia district of Uttar Pradesh, British India. His father was Pt. Ram Suchit Upadhyaya, who was a great scholar of the Bhagavata Puraṇa, and his mother was Murti Devi. He had two brothers.

Upadhyaya's early education was at the Govt. High School, Ballia, except for the years 1911–1912, when he was admitted to the 6th standard at the Bengali Tola Inter College, Benares. He passed his M.A. from the Banaras Hindu University (1922) and the Sahityacharya from the Govt. Sanskrit College, Benares.

He married Shivmuni Devi, daughter of Pt. Dev Krishna Ojha, granddaughter of Pt. Yogesh Dutt Ojha, a Sanskrit scholar and author of the Paribhashendu Shekhar, which was published by the Sampurnanand Sanskrit Vishwavidyalaya, Varanasi.

He died on 10 August in his centenary year 1999 at Varanasi. He had two sons. One of his sons named Dr. G. S. Upadhyaya is retired from IIT Kanpur, where he was a professor in the Department of Materials and Metallurgical Engineering. Dr. G. S. Upadhyaya also had been the head of the department. Prof. G. S. Upadhyaya has died during the COVID-19 period (2020–21). The grandson of Baldev Upadhyaya named Dr. Anish Upadhyaya is currently a professor in the Department of Materials and Metallurgical Engineering at IIT Kanpur.

== Students ==
His students include Hazari Prasad Dwivedi, Vidya Niwas Mishra, Vibhuti Narayan Singh, Sitaram Chaturvedi, Kalu Lal Shrimali, Rewa Prasad Dwivedi, J. N. Chaturvedi, Triloki Nath Chaturvedi, and Vishnu Kant Shastri.

== Major works ==
In 1922 he was appointed as a lecturer in the Department of Sanskrit at the Banaras Hindu University. After serving the institution for 38 years, he retired as the head of the department in 1960. In 1968 he was again appointed the director and professor emeritus of the Research Institute at Sampurnanand Sanskrit University. He also served as the president, Uttar Pradesh Sanskrit Academy, Lucknow.

When he was director of the Research Institute, he was the chief editor of the book series, Sarasvati Bhavana Granthamala, and the Sanskrit journal Sarasvati Sushama. He wrote many books which are the outcome of original studies and are authoritative in their respective fields. He also edited about 25 books.

== Awards and honours ==
- Mangla Prasad Puraskar, 1942
- Dalmia Puraskar, 1946
- Shravan-Nath Puraskara
- Sahitya Varidhi, Prayag, 1972
- D.Litt., 1977
- Certificate of Honour, Awarded by Zakir Husain, the President of India in 1968.
- Kalidas Sahitya Ratna, Ujjain, 1982
- Vishva Sanskrit Bharati Award, U.P. Sanskrit Academy, 1983.
- Padma Bhushan Awarded by Giani Zail Singh, the President of India, in 1984.
- Umaswami Award, Kunda Kunda Bharati Ch. Trust, New Delhi, 1994
- Mahamahopadhyaya, 1997
- Rama Krishna Dalmiya Sri Vani Award, Ramkrishna Dalmiya Trust, New Delhi

== Books ==
Upadhyaya had chosen Hindi as his medium for writing books. There were no authoritative books on all branch of Sanskrit literature in the Hindi language when he began writing

Name of Book	Publisher	Year
Rasika Govinda Aur Unki Kavita	Hindi Nagari Pracharini Sabha, Ballia.	1926
Sukti Muktavali	Haridas Company, Mathura	1932
Sanskrit Kavi Charchā	Master Khedilal, Varanasi	1932
Bhartiya Darshana	Sharda Mandir, Varanasi	1942
Sanskrit Sahitya Ka Itihas	Sharda Mandir, Varanasi	1944
Dharma aur Darshana	Sharda Mandir, Varanasi	1945
Sanskrit Vangmaya	Sharda Mandir, Varanasi	1945
Vaidika Kahaniya	Sharda Mandir, Varanasi	1946
Bauddha Darsana Mimansa	Sharda Mandir, Varanasi	1946
Arya Sanskriti Ke Muladhara	Sharda Mandir, Varanasi	1947
Bhartiya Sahitya Shastra	Prasad Parisad, Varanasi	1948
Bhagvata Sampradaya	Nagari Prachatini Sabha, Varanasi	1954
Vaidika Sahitya Aur Sanskriti	Sharda Sansthan, Varanasi	1955
Sanskrit Alochana	U.P. Sanskrit Sansthan, Lucknow	1956
Kavyanushilana	Ramesh Book Deopt, Jaipur	1956
Bhartiya Vangmaya Mein Sri Radha	Bihar Rastrabhasha Parishad, Patna	1963
Sanskrit Sukavi Samikchha	Chaukamba Vidya Bhavan, Varanasi	1963
Purana Vimarsha	Chaukamba Vidya Bhavan, Varanasi	1965
Sanskrit Shashtron Ka Itihas	Chaukamba Vidya Bhavan, Varanasi	1969
Bhartiya Dharma Aur Darshana	Chaukamba Vidya Bhavan, Varanasi	1977
Sanskrit Sahitya Ka Sanksipta Itihas	Sharda Sansthan, Varanasi	1978
Kashi Ki Panditya Parampara	Sharda Sansthan, Varanasi	1985
Bhartiya Dharma aur Darshana Ka Anushilan	Sharda Sansthan, Varanasi	1985
Vimarshachintamanih	Sharda Sansthan, Varanasi	1987
