= Bharat Kala Bhavan =

Museum in Banaras Hindu University, Varanasi (India)

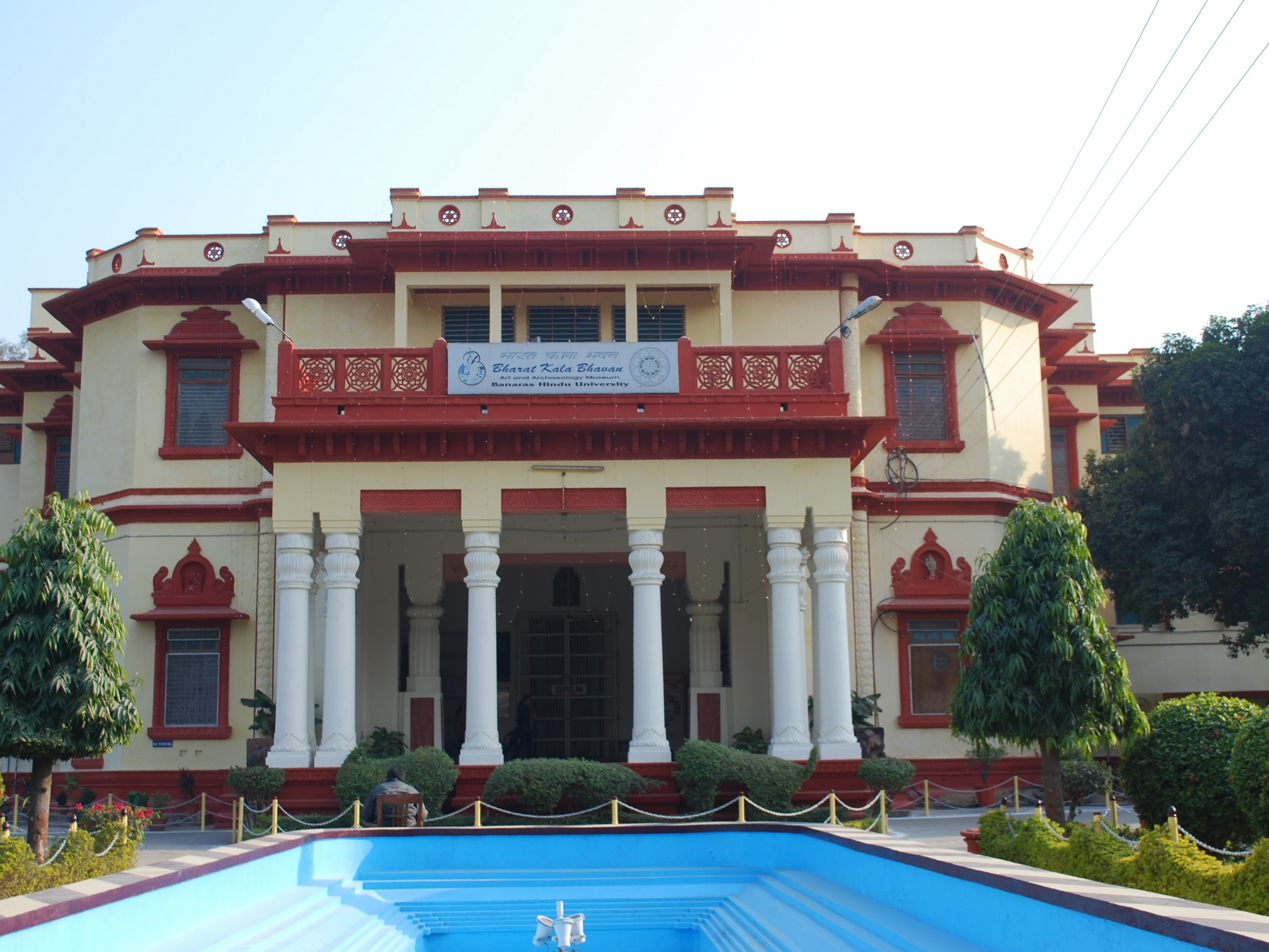
- Bharat Kala Bhavan main building

- Museum location on Map of Varanasi district
- Established: 1 January 1920
- Location: Banaras Hindu University, Varanasi, India
- Coordinates: 25.271490°N 82.995994°E
- Collections: Archaeological materials, Paintings, Textiles & costumes, Decorative art, Personalia collections, Indian philately, Literary and Archival materials
- Collection size: 104,376
- Founders: Rai Krishnadasa & Mahamana Pandit Madan Mohan Malaviya
- Chairpersons: Rabindranath Tagore (first honorary & Life chairman)
- Curators: Dr. Anil Kumar Singh; Vinod Kumar; Dr. D. B. Singh; Dr. Priyanka Chandra; Deepak Bharathan Alathur
- Owner: Banaras Hindu University
- Website: bhu.ac.in/kala

Bharat Kala Bhavan is a university museum located in Banaras Hindu University, Varanasi, India. It has been instrumental in the dissemination of knowledge on Indian art and culture. It is one of the important touristic attractions in the Banaras Hindu University and in the city of Varanasi.

== History ==
The concept for Bharat Kala Bhavan came to fruition with the establishment of Bharatiya Lalit Kala Parishad on 1 January 1920 in a wing in Godowlia, Varanasi. Between 1920 and 1962, the museum's collection was shifted to several locations within Varanasi before Jawaharlal Nehru laid foundation of the existing museum building in 1950 and the museum was, then shifted to its existing location in the Banaras Hindu University in 1962. Mahatma Gandhi visited Bharat Kala Bhavan thrice and in his final trip he inscribed "संग्रह बहुत अच्छा है" ("the collection is very good").

=== Milestones ===
- 1920: Bharatiya Lalit Kala Parishad established.
- 1926: Bharatiya Lalit Kala Parishad shifted from Godowlia to Central Hindu Boys School at Kamachha.
- 1929: Rabindra Nath Tagore (first chairman) decided to focus on art and crafts.
- 1929: Transfer of Bharatiya Lalit Kala Parishad to Kashi Nagari Pracharini Sabha under nomenclature of Bharat Kala Bhavan (Indian Art Museum).
- 1930: Formal opening of Bharat Kala Bhavan in Kashi Nagari Pracharini Sabha by Prof. Ordhendra Coomar Gangoly
- 1945: Silver Jubilee.
- 1947: Lending of exhibits in the exhibitions in London.
- 1950: Transfer of collection from Nagari Prachrini Sabha to Malaviya Bhavan in Banaras Hindu University.
- 1950: Foundation of present building laid by Jawaharlal Nehru.
- 1962: Inauguration of new building by Jawaharlal Nehru.
- 1970: Golden Jubilee.
- 1977: Foundation of Western Wing of building laid by Pratap Chandra Chunder.
- 1980: Passing away of Padma Vibhushan Rai Krishnadasa
- 1990: Inauguration of Alice Boner gallery.
- 1995: Platinum Jubilee.
- 2011: On the 150th birth anniversary of Mahamana Pandit Madan Mohan Malaviya, the museum produced a documentary film & published a book on him.

== Collection ==
Bharat Kala Bhavan has a collection of artefacts, Buddhist and Hindu sculptures, pictures, manuscripts, Mughal miniatures, paintings, brocade textiles, contemporary art forms and bronze statues from 1st–15th century. Pottery, metal craft, ivory goods, jewellery, terracotta beads & a rare collection of Gujarati, Rajasthani & Pahari miniature paintings are also on display in the museum. Total holdings of Bharat Kala Bhawan are 104,376.

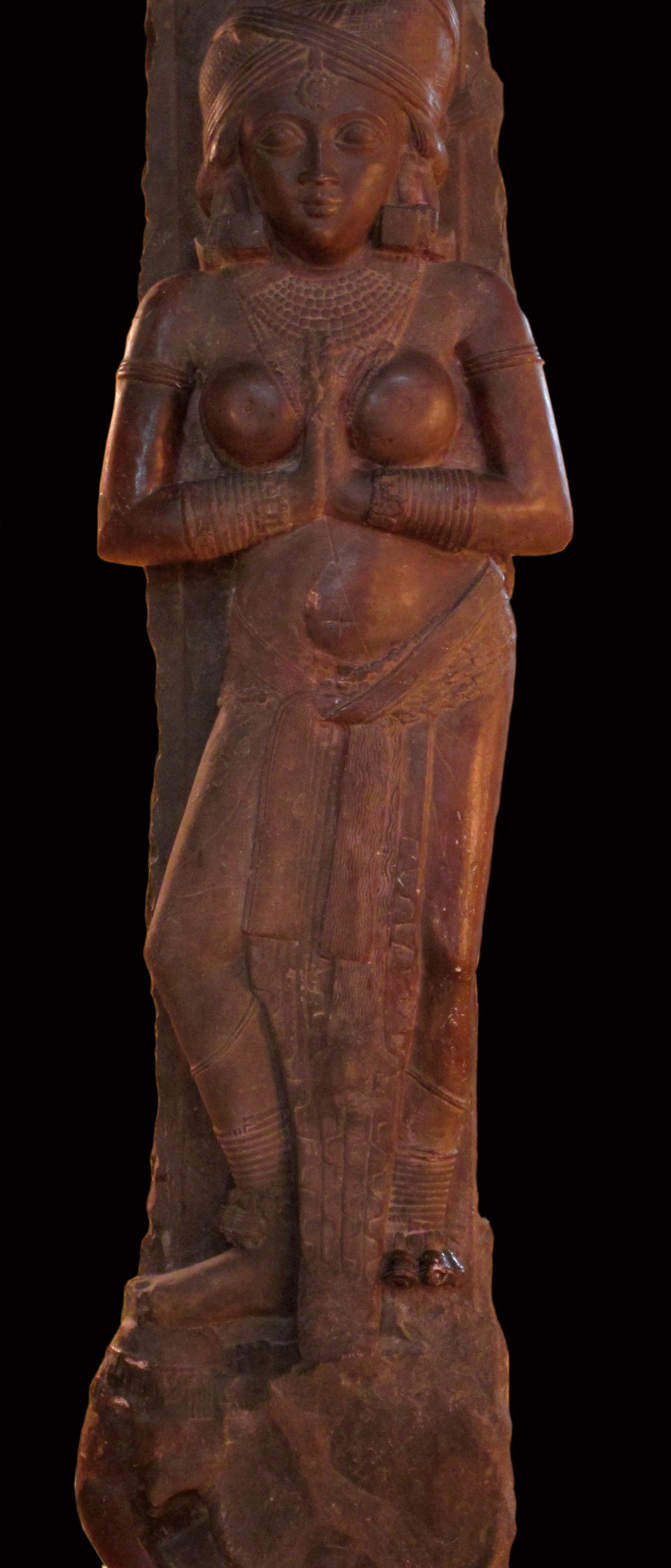
Yakshi on elephant displayed in Bharat Kala Bhavan

The museum's holding are displayed across fourteen galleries, including dedicated spaces such as the Nicholas Roerich Gallery and the Alice Boner Gallery.

=== Items on display ===
- Archival materials
- Archaeological materials
- Decorative art
- Indian philately
- Literary
- Paintings
- Personalia collections
- Textiles & costumes

== Holdings ==
Section	Count
Archeological Section	24,561
Banaras Section	705
Decorative Art Section	1,169
Exchange	76
Literary Section	27,336
Miscellaneous	1,605
Numismatic Section	33,236
Painting Section	10,625
Philately Section	2,941
Textile Section	1,747
Woollen Textile Blocks	375
Total	104,376

== See also ==
- Banaras Hindu University
