= Pratima Singh =

Indian basketball player (born 1990)

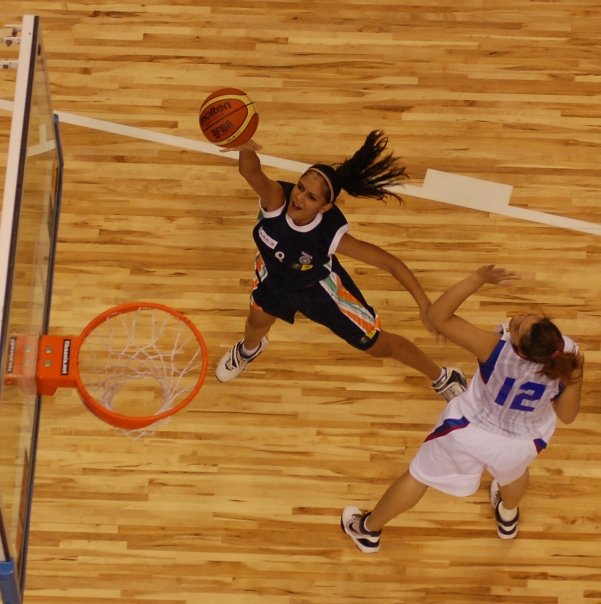
Pratima Singh Indian Basketball Player

Pratima Singh is a member of the India women's national basketball team, hailing from Jaunpur, Uttar Pradesh. Pratima Singh was born on 6 February 1990 in the Shivpur area in the holy city of Varanasi in Uttar Pradesh. Born in Varanasi, her siblings have also either played or are playing for India- her sisters Divya and Priyanka have represented Indian National Women's Basketball Team, while Prashanti Singh an Arjuna Award and Padma Shri winner is the current captain of the team and Akanksha is a member.

== Playing career ==
Singh started playing basketball in 2003 in Uttar Pradesh and later learned basketball at Udai Pratap college. With her growing basketball skills she was selected to the Junior Indian team in the year of 2006 and captained the Junior Indian Girls team in 2008. Under her leadership, Delhi has won many medals such as Junior National championship in Bhilwara and Rajasthan.

She led the Delhi University Team in All India Inter-university, Kottayam, Kerala, 2010 and won the gold medal. She was vice Captain when University of Delhi won a gold medal in the All India University basketball Championship at Nellore, where she was given joint best player award along with her sister Akanksha Singh.

She is a product of Jesus and Mary College (2008–09), she won many 'Best Player' titles at the university level. Her peers in college knew her as someone with a lot of style and chutzpah. She won a gold medal for the country in the first 3×3 FIBA Asia Championship. She was also known as a fighter as she fought through her knee injury with a lot of hard work and avoided an operation and then performed after a year of hard work and became the highest scorer of the tournament in 2012.

== Personal life ==
She comes from a family of Indian basketball players, three of her sisters currently are a member of the Indian women's national basketball team. They are also known as Singh Sisters.

- Priyanka Singh (a National Institute of Sports Basketball Coach)
- Divya Singh (Currently Coach of U16 Indian Men Basketball Team)
- Prashanti Singh (Former/Retired captain of India women's national basketball team)
- Akanksha Singh (Former/Retired member of India women's national basketball team and founder of the Akanksha Singh Basketball Academy)

On 10 December 2016, she married Indian cricketer Ishant Sharma.

== Awards and achievements ==
- Gold Medallist in Diploma in Sports Coaching from Netaji Subhas National Institute of Sports, 2014–15
- Gold Medal at the inaugural FIBA Asia 3x3 Championship 2013.
- Achievers Award from Women sports foundation of India 2013
- Top Scorer of the Tournament in Senior National Basketball Championship in Chennai, Tamil Nadu 2011-2016
- Shri Prakash Jyoti Award for Excellence in sports in Jesus & Mary College, 2009–10
- Century Sports Award for Excellence in Sports 2010 Varanasi, Uttar Pradesh
- Sports women of the year in Jesus and Mary College for year 2008-09
- Best Player in All India Intra University, Nellore, Andhra Pradesh.

== International sporting achievement ==
- Asian Games 2010 Guangzhou, China, 12 November to 27 November 2010
- 24th FIBA Asian Basketball Championship for Senior Women, 2009, Chennai, India
- 18th FIBA Asian Basketball Championship for Junior Women 2007, Bangkok, Thailand
- 2nd FIBA Asian Basketball Championship for Young Women, 2006, Singapore
