= Prashanti Singh =

Indian basketball player (born 1984)

No. 14 – Mahanagar Telephone Nigam Ltd.
- Position: Small forward/shooting guard

Personal information
- Born: 5 May 1984 (age 42) Varanasi, Uttar Pradesh, India
- Listed height: 5 ft 8 in (1.73 m)
- Listed weight: 65 Kg

Career information
- Playing career: International: 2002–present

Prashanti Singh (born 5 May 1984) is a shooting guard for the Indian national women's basketball team. She is first basketball player in India conferred with National Civilian Award Padma Shri in 2019. She has been honoured with the Arjuna Award by the Ministry of Youth Affairs and Sports, Government of India in 2017. She has also been conferred with the prestigious Rani Laxmi Bai Bravery Award 2016–17 in the field of sports by Government of Uttar Pradesh.

She is member of Talent Identification & Development Committee 2024, Khelo India by Ministry of Sports, Government Of India.She is member of prestigious All India Council of Sports 2024, Government of India.

Prashanti represented the national team at 2006 Commonwealth Games, 16th Asian Games in Guangzhou, China in 2010 and 17th Asian Games in Incheon 2014. Her sisters Divya Singh, Akanksha Singh, and Pratima Singh, have also represented the Indian national women's basketball team. Another sister, Priyanka Singh, is a National Institute of Sports basketball coach. Together they are also known as Singh Sisters.

== Playing career ==
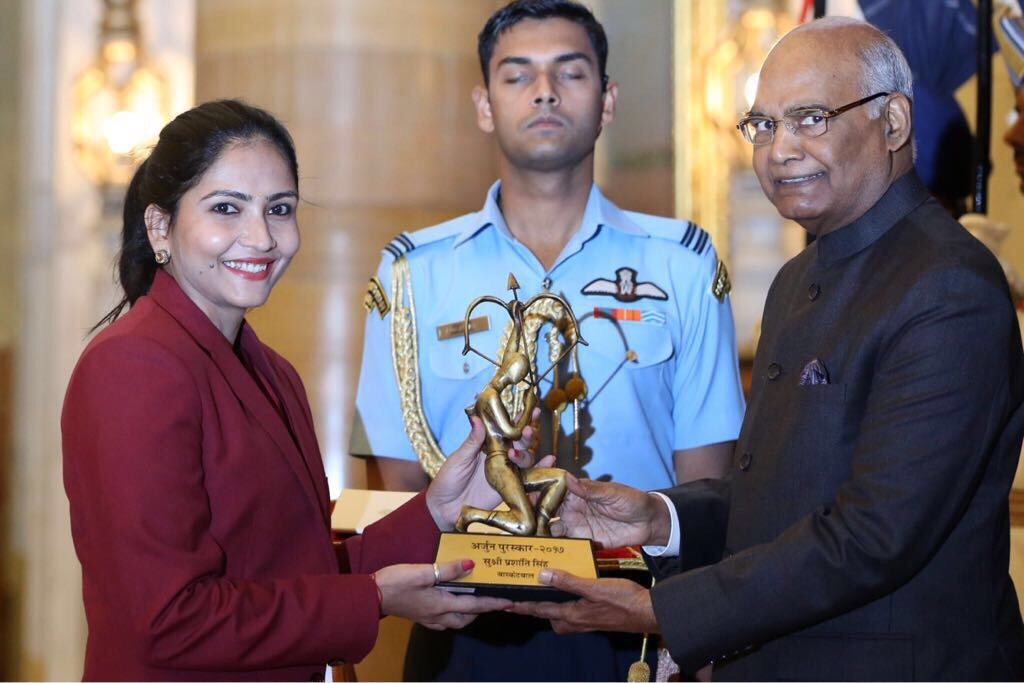
Receiving the Arjuna Award in 2017 from the President of India

Prashanti joined the Indian women's basketball team in 2002 and soon became its captain. She played as captain in 3rd Asian Indoor Games which were held in Vietnam on 30 October – 8 November 2009 where the team won a silver medal. Prashanti won gold medal in South Asian Beach Games at Sri Lanka in 2011.

Prashanti Singh is most decorated woman basketball player in India. She is one of the top four A grade player of India selected and sponsored by Basketball Federation of India & IMG-Reliance.

She has won 22 medals in the National Championships, National Games and Federation Cups in India. She holds the national record of having most medals at senior level in National Championships for one state team. She is first woman Basketball player in India to represent the National team in one 2006 Commonwealth Games & two Asian Games 2010, 2014 respectively.

She is also a member of the International Women's Film Forum of Asian Academy of Film & Television. Prashanti Singh is first and only basketball player in India who has a documentary film named B Cube (Boskey Basketball Banaras) on her own life which is selected in top xix films in the prestigious Satyajit Ray Film Festival.

=== International sporting achievements ===
| Year | Competition | Venue | Position | Notes |
Representing India
| 2016 | 2016 South Asian Games | Guwahati | | Won all Matches (Team Captain) |
| 2014 | 17th Asian Games Incheon | Incheon | Top 6 | |
| 2013 | 25 FIBA ASIA Basketball Championship for Senior Women | Bangkok, Thailand | Top 5 | |
| 2013 | International exposure trip at NBA Training Centre | Dongguan, China | Winner | |
| 2011 | 1st Asian Beach Games | Sri Lanka | Won Gold | |
| 2011 | FIBA Asian Basketball Championship for Senior Women | Nagasaki, Japan | | |
| 2011 | 33 William Jones Cup | China, Taipei | | |
| 2010 | 16th Asian Games | Guangzhou, China | | As Captain |
| 2009 | Asian Indoor Games | Vietnam | Won Silver | |
| 2009 | FIBA Asian Basketball Championship for Senior Women | Chennai | | |
| 2007 | FIBA Asia Championship for Women | Incheon, South Korea | Winner GB | |
| 2006 | 2006 Commonwealth Games | Melbourne | | As Point Guard |
| 2006 | Friendly Match Series | Auckland, New Zealand | | |
| 2006 | First Phuket International Invitational Basketball Championship | Thailand | Won Gold | |
| 2005 | 20th Asian Basketball Confederation Championship for Senior Women | Sendai, Japan | Silver GB | |
| | Portdiction International Invitation Tournament | | Won Bronze | |
| 2002-3 | Fiba Asia Basketball Championship for Junior Women | Chinese, Taipei | | |

=== National sporting achievement ===
| Year | Competition | Venue | Position | Notes |
Representing India
| 2016 | 66th Senior National Basketball Championship | Mysore | Bronze Medal | |
| 2015 | 65th Senior National Basketball Championship | Rajasthan | Silver Medal | |
| 2014 | 64th IMG Reliance National Basketball Championship | New Delhi | Bronze Medal | |
| 2013 | 3 × 3 National Basketball Championship | New Delhi | Silver Medal | |
| 2012 | Mahindra NBA Challenge National Final | New Delhi | Gold Medal | MVP (Most Valuable Player) of the Championship |
| 2012 | 25th Federation Cup Basketball Championship | Kerala | Bronze Medal | |
| 2011 | National Games | Ranchi, Jharkhand | Bronze Medal | |
| 2011 | 24th Federation Cup Basketball Championship | Raipur | Bronze Medal | Top Scorer Award with the average of 31 point per game |
| 2010–11 | 61st IMG Reliance National Basketball Championship | New Delhi | Silver Medal | |
| 2009–10 | 60th National Basketball Championship | Ludhiana, Punjab | Silver Medal | |
| 2008–09 | 59th National Basketball Championship | Surat, Gujarat | Silver Medal | |
| 2008 | 33rd National Sports Festival for Women | Jalandhar | Silver Medal | |
| 2007–08 | 58th National basketball championship | Pondicherry | Silver Medal | Captain |
| 2007 | 23rd Federation Cup Basketball Championship | Rourkela | Bronze Medal | |
| 2006–07 | 57th Senior National Basketball Championship | Jaipur, Rajasthan | Silver Medal | |
| 2006 | 22nd Federation Cup Basketball Championship | Jamshedpur, Jharkhand | Silver Medal | |
| 2006 | 56th Senior National Basketball Championship | Pune, Maharashtra | Silver Medal | |
| 2005 | R.Vaikuntam Cup Basketball Championship for Women | New Delhi | Silver Medal | |
| 2005 | 21st Karp Impex Federation Cup Basketball Championship | Bhavnagar, Gujarat | Silver Medal | |
| 2005 | 55th Senior National Basketball Championship | Ludhiana, Punjab | Silver Medal | |
| 2004 | 54th Senior National Basketball Championship | Odisha | Silver Medal | |
| 2003 | 20th Federation Cup Basketball Championship | Vashi, Navi Mumbai | Bronze Medal | |
| 2003 | 53rd Senior National Basketball Championship | Hyderabad, Andhra Pradesh | Gold Medal | Broke 14 years old record |

== Awards and achievement ==
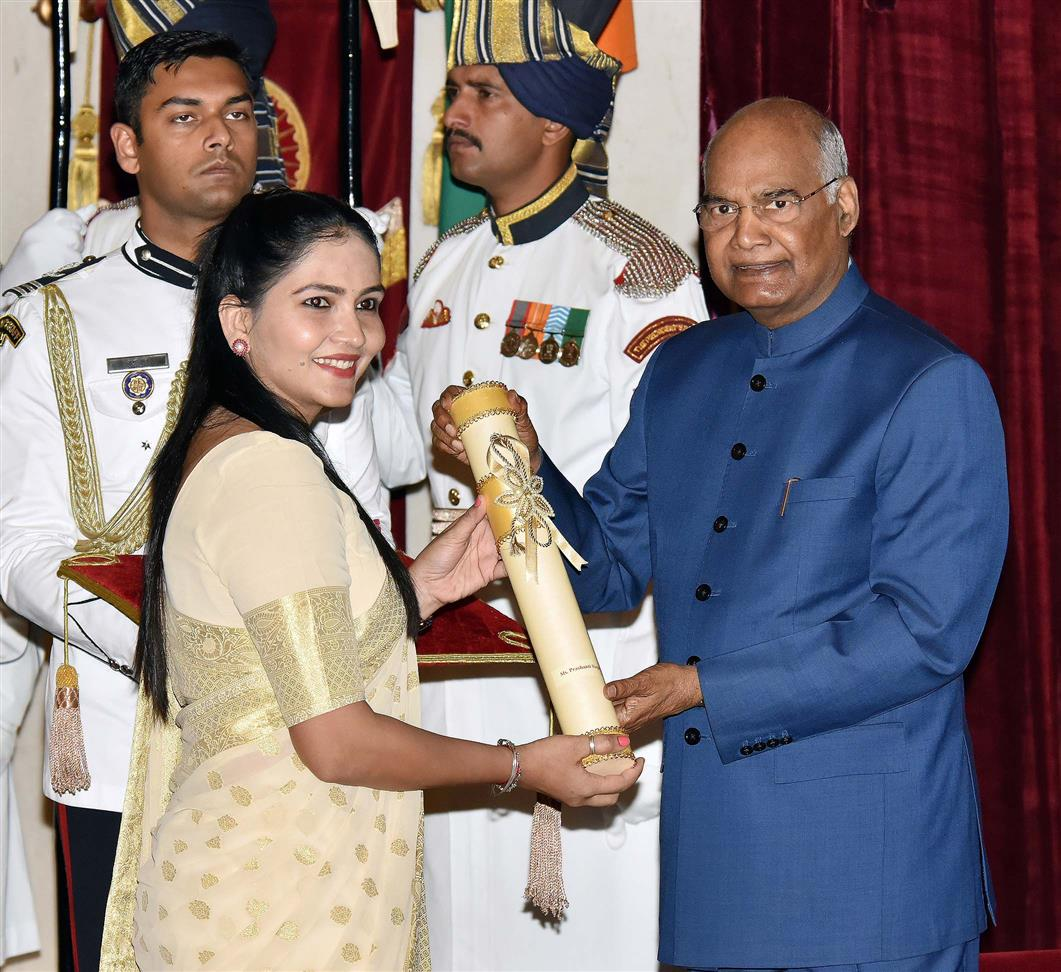
The President, Shri Ram Nath Kovind presenting the Padma Shri Award to Prashanti Singh, at an Investiture Ceremony, at Rashtrapati Bhavan, in New Delhi on 16 March 2019

- March 2019 : Padma Shri by Government of India
- August 2017 : Arjuna Award by Government of India
- December 2016–17 : Rani Laxmi Bai Award (Outstanding Sports Person) by Uttar Pradesh Government
- December 2015–16 : Poorvanchal Ratna (Top Sports Person)
- October 2015 : Shakti Samman by APN News
- March 2015 : UP ke Sartaj titled by Radio Mirchi 98.3 FM.
- January 2015 : National record with 23 medals for one team in senior level.
- June 2013: Lokmat Samman (sportsperson of the year 2013) in Lucknow.
- October 2012: MVP (most valuable player) of Mahindra NBA challenge National Final in New Delhi.
- April 2011: Captained team West & won Best Player award in All Star Game in Mumbai.
- February 2011: Top scorer award with 129 points (25.8-point/game) in prestigious 25th IMG-Reliance Federation Cup, Raipur
- 2011: She is one of the first ever ranked Top Four A Grade elite Basketball player of India.
- 2010: Elle Magazine – first Indian basketball player featured in the May 2010 edition
- October 2006: Century Sports Award by Century Sports Club, Varanasi
- August 2006: Outstanding Player Honour by UP College Old Students' Association
- December 2002: Best Player Award in UP State School Championship, held at Ghaziabad

== Early life and academics ==
Prashanti is originally from Varanasi and moved to Delhi for her career. In Delhi, she trained and joined MTNL team. She is a graduate in arts from University of Delhi, India.

== Family ==
Prashanti singh belongs to a famous basketball family of India. They are known as the “Singh Sisters”. She belongs to Solanki Rajput family of Varanasi. Three of her sisters currently are a member of the Indian women's national basketball team.

- Sister Divya Singh (Currently Student and working with University of Delaware women's basketball team)
- Sister Akanksha Singh (former member of India women's national basketball team)
- Sister Pratima Singh (India women's national basketball team player), wife of Ishant Sharma
