= Deviprasad Dwivedi =

Indian writer and teacher

- Born: 20 October 1956 (age 69); Varanasi, Uttar Pradesh, India
- Occupation(s): Scholar, writer
- Awards: Padma Bhushan; Padma Shri; Aacharya Ratna; Chatrapati Sivaji Samman; Kashi Gaurav Alankarn; Ved Pandit Puraskar
- Website: Official web site

Deviprasad Dwivedi is an Indian writer and teacher, known for his scholarship in Sanskrit literature. The Government of India honoured Sharma in 2011, with the fourth highest Indian civilian award of the Padma Shri and followed it up with Padma Bhushan, the third-highest civilian award, in 2017.

== Biography ==
Deviprasad Dwivedi was born on 2h0 October 1956 in Varanasi, in the Indian state of Uttar Pradesh. He passed his first master's degree (MA) in Sociology from the Banares Hindu University and followed it up with the degrees of Sahityacharya and Acharya (MA Linguistics) from Sampurnanand Sanskrit University, (SSU) Varanasi. His doctoral degree (PhD) also came from the same university. He has also secured the degree of DLitt from the SSU.

Dwivedi started his career by joining his alma mater as a faculty member and is the Professor of Linguistics, in the Department of Modern Languages and Linguistics at Sampurnanand Sanskrit University. He is also the Deputy Director at Yog Sadhana Kendra and Shankrachrya Mandap of the university. A visiting faculty at the Assam University, Dwivedi has assisted many research scholars for their theses. He is also credited with many articles and books, Baudha Darshan Mimansa, Chitra Champu Kavyasya Sasamiksham Sampadanam, Sanskrit Dhwani Vigyan, Kavya Shastriya Paribhashik Shabdon Ki Nirukti being a few of them.

Deviprasad Dwivedi has worked as a newscaster for Akashvani and serves as the trustee of Shri Venimadhvapur Trust, Mirzapur and Shri Vishveshwar Trust, Varanasi and as the Acharya of Kashi Vishwanath temple. He has also served Janvarta Hindi Dainik, a local daily, as its Varanasi correspondent. A member of the Discipline Committee of Rashtriya Sanskrit Sansthan, and a former member of Uttar Pradesh Public Service Commission, Dwivedi has been nominated as a member of the committee of the Swachh Bharat Abhiyan campaign, initiated by Narendra Modi, the Prime Minister of India.

Dwivedi has received several honours such as the Aacharya Ratna award from the Pazhassi Raja Charitable Trust, Kerala, Ved Pandit Puraskar (1995), Chatrapati Sivaji Samman (2011) and Kashi Gaurav Alankarn (2011). In 2011, he was honored by the Government of India with the civilian award of Padma Shri. He was also honored with the title of Padma Bhushan in 2017.

== See also ==
- Sampurnanand Sanskrit University
- Sanskrit literature
- Swachh Bharat Abhiyan
