= Divya Singh =

Indian basketball player (born 1982)

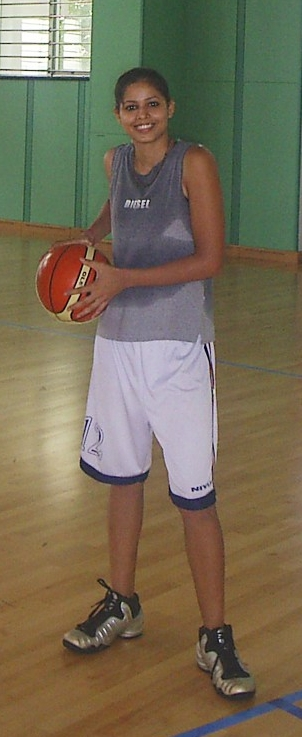

No. 4 – University of Delaware (women's basketball assistant coach)
- Position: Guard/forward

Personal information
- Born: 21 July 1982 (age 44) Varanasi, Uttar Pradesh, India
- Listed height: 6 ft 0 in (1.83 m)

Career information
- High school: RMKBI, Varanasi
- Playing career: (International)-2002–2007

Divya Singh (Hindi:'दिव्या सिंह') (born 21 July 1982) is former captain of the Indian National Women's Basketball Team. Singh led the Indian women's basketball team at the 2006 Melbourne Commonwealth Games. She is known for her game skills, leadership qualities, academic strength and personality. She has done sports management at the University of Delaware, Newark, Delaware, (UD) in the year 2008 to 2010 and worked as a Women's basketball assistant coach for UD. She was assistant coach of the Under 16 Indian Men's basketball team which participated in Vietnam 2011. She was the assistant coach of the Indian Men's team when India won the bronze medal in Lusophony Games in Goa. She was also a part of the Indian National Women's Basketball Team as an assistant coach in the 17th Asian Games Incheon 2014.

She works in MTNL, Delhi. She comes from the Varanasi's "Basketball Family of India" whose four out of five sisters have either played or playing for Indian national team. Her sisters Prashanti, Akanksha, and Pratima, have represented Indian National Women's Basketball Team. Akanksha Singh is the current captain of the team. Another sister Priyanka Singh is an NIS basketball coach. Together they are also known as Singh Sisters. She has one brother, Vikrant Solanki, who plays football. He has played many nationals from Uttar Pradesh and junior I-league. He is a student in Sri Venkateshwara College in New Delhi

Singh has been a successful coach at many colleges in Delhi including St. Stephen's College and Jesus & Mary College. She is also working as a coach with the Delhi women's basketball team.

== International sporting achievements ==
- 3 to 10 June 2007, Incheon, South Korea - winner in Pool-B at FIBA Asia Championship for Women
- 15 to 26 March 2006, Melbourne (Australia) Commonwealth Games as captain
- 7 to 12 March 2006, Auckland, New Zealand Friendly Match Series
- 22 to 25 September 2006, Phuket, Thailand - Gold in First Phuket International Invitational Basketball Championship
- 13 to 19 January 2005, Sendai, Japan - Silver in 20th Asian Basketball Confederation Championship for Senior Women
- 29 October to 2 November, Kuala Lumpur, Malaysia - Bronze in Port Dickson International Invitational Basketball Championship for Senior Women

== Awards and achievements ==
- 2002 - Best Player Award in Senior UP State Championship, held at Kanpur
- 2002 - Award for outstanding player from Lucknow Basketball Association
- 2002 - Award as an outstanding player from Vice chancellor of the Benaras Hindu University, Varanasi
- 2004 - Century Sports Award by Centaury Sports Club
- 2005 - Best Player in 21st Karp Impex Federation Cup Basketball Championship
- 2006 - Captain of the Indian Basketball team at Commonwealth Games in Melbourne (Australia)
- 2006 - Outstanding Player Honour by Udai Pratap Autonomous College, Varanasi Old Students' Association
- 2013 - FIBA Level 1 Coaching certificate
- 2016-17 - Bharat Gaurav Awards for excellence is sports
- 2017 - Rani Laxmi Bai Bravery Award from the Government of Uttar Pradesh

== National sporting achievement ==
Divya Singh in action for Delhi

- Bronze Medal in 20th Federation Cup Basketball Championship, 2003, Vashi, Navi Mumbai
- Gold Medal in 53rd Senior National Basketball Championship, 2003, Hyderabad, AP
- Silver Medal in R.Vaikuntam Cup Basketball Championship for Women, 2005, New Delhi
- Silver Medal in 21st Karp Impex Federation Cup Basketball Championship, 2005, Bhavnagar, Gujarat
- Silver Medal in 55th Senior National Basketball Championship, 2005, Ludhiana, Punjab
- Silver Medal in 57th Senior National Basketball Championship 2006–07, Jaipur, Rajasthan
- Silver Medal in 22nd Federation Cup Basketball Championship, 2006, Jamshedpur, Jharkhand
- Silver Medal in 56th Senior National Basketball Championship, 2006, Pune, Maharashtra

== Academic ==
- Elementary schooling from Rajershi Shishu Vihar, Uday Pratap College, Varanasi, Uttar Pradesh
- High school from R.M.K.B.I. College, Varanasi
- Bachelors in physical education from Banaras Hindu University, India
- sports management from University of Delaware, Newark, Delaware

== Family ==
Singh comes from a family of basketball players. Of her sisters, three are currently members of the Indian India women's national basketball team:

  - Prashanti Singh (currently member of India women's national basketball team)
  - Akanksha Singh (currently member of India women's national basketball team)
  - Pratima Singh (currently captain Junior India women national basketball team)
  - Priyanka Singh (NIS basketball coach, wife of Manish Kumar who is also an NIS basketball coach)
