= Shrinarayan Chaturvedi =

Indian writer and journalist

- Born: 28 September 1895; Etawah
- Died: 18 August 1990 (aged 94)
- Education: Allahabad University; University of London Worldwide
- Occupations: Writer, litterateur, publicist, journalist
- Writing career
- Pen name: Shrivar, Vinod Sharma
- Language: Hindi
- Notable work: Editor of Saraswati magazine
- Notable awards: Padma Bhushan (1984)

Shrinarayan Chaturvedi (also spelled as Shri Narain Chaturvedi) (born 28 September 1895, in Etawah, Uttar Pradesh; died on 18 August 1990) was an Indian writer, litterateur, publicist, and journalist known for his contributions to the promotion of the Hindi language. He served as the editor of Saraswati. In 1984, he received the Padma Bhushan for contributions to literature from the Government of India.

== Early life and education ==
Shrinarayan Chaturvedi was born in 1895 in the Etawah district of Uttar Pradesh. However, in his autobiography titled Parivesh Ki Katha, he states that his date of birth is 28 December 1893.

His father, Dwarika Prasad was a Sanskrit scholar of his era in the region and authored over a hundred books. His father's scholarship influenced his intellectual pursuits. He received his education at University of Allahabad, where he studied history. After completing his higher education, he worked as a teacher for a period. In 1925, with a scholarship from the Uttar Pradesh Government, he pursued higher studies in education in England, earning an M.A. in education from the University of London. Later, in 1928, after completing his studies, he was appointed as an officer in the Education Department of Uttar Pradesh.

== Work ==
Shrinarayan Chaturvedi dedicated his life to the promotion of the Hindi language. Recognizing his commitment to Hindi, following the suggestion of Purushottam Das Tandon, Chaturvedi was appointed Deputy Director General (Language) at All India Radio during Sardar Patel's tenure as Minister of Information. His efforts led to the cessation of Arab-Persianization of the language used in radio broadcasts. Upon retiring from radio service, he served as the Director of the Education and Archaeology Department of Central India for four years.

Chaturvedi, under the pseudonym 'Shrivar,' wrote poetry and published two collections, namely Ratnadeep and Jeevan Kan. He translated books such as Vishwa Ka Itihas and Shashan from English. He served as the editor of the dictionary Visvabharati published in Hindi. For two decades, starting in 1955, he successfully edited the historical Hindi monthly magazine Saraswati. On the literary front, he authored and translated 36 books, and under the pen name 'Vinod Sharma', he penned satires. He also had interests in archaeology and art.

== Bibliography ==
- Pavan Smaran
- Hindi Vishv Bharti Khand
- Gramya - Shiksha Ka Itihas
- Vishw Ki Kahani
- Hindi Vishva - Bharati
- Munshii Abhinandan Granth
- Ratnadeep
- Jeevan Kan
- Shashan

== Awards and recognition ==
The Uttar Pradesh government awarded him the Bharat Bharti Award, one of the highest literary honors given by the state. However, when the government decided to accord Urdu the status of the second official language of the state, Chaturvedi declined this award in protest.

In 1984, the Government of India awarded him the Padma Bhushan, the third-highest civilian honor in India, for his contributions to literature.

The Uttar Pradesh Hindi Sansthan has established the Pandit Shrinarayan Chaturvedi Sahitya Samman, a literary award with a monetary prize of ₹2,00,000, presented in recognition of outstanding literary contributions. In 1992, Prabhat Prakashan published the biography Hindimay Jivan Pandit Shrinarayan Chaturvedi, written by Vidya Niwas Mishra.
