= Akanksha Singh =

Indian basketball player (born 1989)

Indian women Basketball team / Delhi
- Position: Small forward / point guard

Personal information
- Born: 7 September 1989 (age 37) Varanasi, Uttar Pradesh, India
- Listed height: 5 ft 6 in (1.68 m)

Career information
- Playing career: International: 2003–present

Akanksha Singh (born 7 September 1989 in Varanasi Uttar Pradesh) is an Indian basketball player and former captain of the India Women's National Basketball Team. She has played for the national team since 2004. She and her sisters, Divya, Prashanti, and Pratima are known as the "fantastic four" of the Indian women's basketballers, and are also known as the "Singh Sisters".

== Playing career ==
In 2003, Akanksha Singh made her debut in the Senior Nationals and played for the Uttar Pradesh team when she was just an 11th grader. In 2004, she followed her sisters' footsteps on the Delhi team. In 2010, Akanksha was awarded the Most Valuable Player in India's first professional basketball league, the MPBL. Her name was forever cemented in the Indian basketball history books as one of the first-ever top four players to achieve the "A Grade" from the Basketball Federation of India sponsored by IMG Reliance. She is often called the "small wonder" in basketball.

She has been awarded Best Player in many national and state championships. In her captaincy at the University of Delhi, she won a gold medal in the All India University basketball championship at Nellore, where she was given joint best player award along with her sister Pratima Singh.

== Personal life ==
Singh comes from a family of basketball players. She completed her undergraduate studies at St. Stephen’s College, Delhi. Her sisters Divya, Prashanti, and Pratima have represented the Indian National Women's Basketball Team. Oldest among the sisters is Priyanka, who is a National Institute of Sports basketball coach. Her sister Divya worked with the University of Delaware basketball team. Her brother Vikrant Solanki is a football player In the I-league and Santosh Trophy competitions. Akanksha currently runs the Akanksha Singh Basketball Academy based out of Bangalore.

== Awards and achievements ==
- Awarded as one of the best four ‘A grade players’ across the country in women's basketball in India
- May 2010 - Most Valuable Player in first All India Mastan Basketball Professional League held at Mumbai, Maharashtra
- May 2010 - Best Player Award in the league match in MBPL, Mumbai, Maharashtra
- 2008 - Most Valuable Player in All India Inter University Basketball Tournament held at Nellore, Andhra Pradesh
- 2008 - Best Player Award in Lady Shri Ram College for Women, New Delhi
- September 2006 - Best Player Award in XXXII St. Stephens College invitational basketball tournament held at St. Stephen's College, Delhi
- September 2005 - Best Player Award in XXXI St. Stephens College invitational basketball tournament held at St. Stephens College, Delhi

== International sporting achievements ==
- Asian Games 2014 Incheon, KOREA, 19 September to 4 October 2014
- 34th Williams Jones Cup invitational tournament 2012, Miaoli county, Taiwan
- 25th FIBA Asian Basketball Championship for senior women, 2011, Nagasaki, Japan
- 33rd William Jones Cup 2011, Hsinchuang Gymnasium, Chinese Taipei
- Asian Games 2010 Guangzhou, China, 12 November to 27 November 2010
- 24th FIBA Asian Basketball Championship for Senior Women, 2009, Chennai, India
- 23rd FIBA Asian Basketball Championship for Senior Women, 2007, Korea
- 18th FIBA Asian Basketball Championship for Junior Women 2007, Bangkok, Thailand
- 2nd FIBA Asian Basketball Championship for Young Women, 2006, Singapore
- 17th FIBA Asian Basketball Championship for Junior Women, 2004, Shenzhen, China
- Indian Camp for 21st FIBA Asian Basketball Championship for Senior Women, 2005, Qinhuangdao City, China
