= Shiv Prasaad Singh =

Indian novelist (1928–1998)

- Born: 19 August 1928; Jalalpur, Benares district, United Provinces
- Died: 28 September 1998 (aged 70)
- Education: Banaras Hindu University
- Occupations: Writer, novelist
- Writing career
- Language: Hindi
- Notable works: Vaishwanar, Gali Age Mudti Hai, Neela Chand, Alag Alag Vatratani
- Notable awards: Kendra Sahitya Akademi Award Sharda Samman; Vyas Samman

Shiv Prasaad Singh (19 August 1928 – 28 September 1998) was an Indian writer, university professor and scholar of the Hindi language. He is well-known for writing novels, short stories and critiques in Hindi. He was formerly a professor of Hindi literature in Benares Hindu University. He received the Kendra Sahitya Akademi Award in 1990 for his novel Neela Chand.Due to his extensive portrayal of post-independence rural Northern India in various novels, such as Alag Alag Vaitarani, he faced criticism from elite Hindi circles who labeled him an "Aanchalik" (regional) writer. The intelligentsia often referred to this regional writing as a lesser form of literature, arguing that a focus merely on local village dialects, customs, and rural poverty (dehat) lacked the sophistication and universal appeal of urban stories. Despite this criticism, he is regarded as one of the most important writers of the Hindi "Aanchalik" genre, second only to Phanishwar Nath Renu.

== Biography ==
Shiv Prasaad Singh was born into a peasant family in the village of Jalalpur in the Benares district of United Provinces. His schooling was done at Uday Pratap College, Benares. He continued his education at Benares Hindu University from where he obtained his BA, MA and PhD degrees. He started his career as a lecturer in Banaras Hindu University in 1953 and retired from there as a professor in 1988.

== Legacy ==
His most important work is Neela Chand, published in 1990. This book won several awards, such as the Kendra Sahitya Akademi Award in 1990, the Sharda Samman, the Vyas Samman, etc. It is the second part of his Kashi Trilogy which was inspired by Lawrence Durrell’s The Alexandria Quartet. Vaishwanar and Gali Age Mudti Hai are the first and third parts respectively of the same series. In the book Cultural Landscapes and the Lifeworld: Literary Images of Benares, Rana P. B. Singh states that Neela Chand "highlights the integrity of landscape with the culture." The third novel in the series, Gali Age Mudti Hai, that was the first to be published in 1967, put Singh at the forefront of city-fiction writers in Hindi. He was already being acclaimed for his technical experimentation in his short story Daadi Maa. His novel made his position and voice stronger. This novel is frankly modern, and its protagonist, Anand, is a "flâneur" who also happens to be the writer's alter ego. This novel portrays various times and colours of the city of Varanasi lovingly and in detail.

== Works ==
- Vaishwanar (2004)
- Uttaryogi Shri Arvind (2008)
- Neela Chand (2010)
- Gali Age Mudti Hai (2010)
- Dadi Maa (2011)
- Alag Alag Vaitarni (2015)

== Awards and recognitions ==
- Kendra Sahitya Akademi Award
- Vyas Samman (1992)
- Sharda Samman
