= Rai Krishnadasa =

Indian author

Rai Krishnadasa was an Indian author and scholar who was awarded the Padma Vibhushan, India' second-highest civilian award, in 1980, and was the founder and director of Bharat Kala Bhavan, a university museum.
