= Jalalpur, Ghazipur =

Jalalpur
- Village
- Location in Uttar Pradesh, India
- Country: India
- State: Uttar Pradesh
- District: Ghazipur
- Established: 1943; 83 years ago

Government
  - Type: Panchayati Raj (India)
  - Body: Gram Pradhan

Area
  - Total: 203.9 ha (504 acres)
- Elevation: 70 m (230 ft)

Population (2011)
  - Total: 340
  - Density: 170/km^{2} (430/sq mi)

Languages
  - Official: Bhojpuri, Hindi, Urdu
- Time zone: UTC+5:30 (IST)
- PIN: 232326
- Telephone code: 05497
- Vehicle registration: UP 61

Jalalpur is a village located in Zamania tehsil of Ghazipur district of Uttar Pradesh, India. The village was originally a part of Dewaitha but was later made into a separate village. The village derived its name from Jalaluddin Khan who was a child of Wasil Khan (First Pradhan and Raja of Dewaitha). Wasil Khan was referred to as the most charitable and helping person of Dewaitha and nearby villages. The name Jalalpur was kept in honour of Wasil Khan who was father of Jalaluddin Khan. It is said that Wasil Khan and his brothers bought land and after some year donated almost 150 acres of land to poor people for the establishment of this village so the people named the village after Wasil Khan's son, Jalaluddin Khan. Jalaluddin Khan also served as the Pradhan of Dewaitha. The village of Jalalpur was previously known as Babhanpura, a large population of Brhaman family's also here who shifted here in 1950s and bought land from poor families who went to the cities. Much of the land donated by Wasil Khan and his brother was owned by Braahman and Rajput families of nearby villages.

== Historical population ==
Population Growth of Dildarnagar Kamsar
Year	Pop.	±%
1951	300	—
1961	330	+10.0%
1971	365	+10.6%
1981	405	+11.0%
1991	605	+49.4%
2001	550	−9.1%
2011	340	−38.2%
Source:Census of India
