= Arthur Venis =

Arthur Venis (4 October 1857 – 5 June 1918) CIE was a British educator and Sanskrit scholar. He was also a Member of the Legislative Council of the United Province.

== Life ==
He was the second son of Edward John Lazarus M.D. of Calcutta and Benares; his younger brother Maurice Dyte Venis was admitted to Clare College, Cambridge in 1883. His father was a Sanskritist, a convert to Christianity from a Jewish background. He worked in Dacca as a "native doctor", later becoming a surgeon and moving to Benares. An entry in the Middle Temple register for Maurice Dyte Venis indicates that by 1884 his father used the name Edward John Lazarus Venis. On the other hand, Arthur's graduation at Balliol was as "Lazarus, A. V.".

Arthur Venis studied at the University of Edinburgh. He matriculated as a non-collegiate student at the University of Oxford in 1874, graduating B.A. in Balliol College, Oxford in 1878, and M.A. in 1885.

Venis joined the Indian Educational Service in 1881, and started his teaching career as Professor of English, Queen's College, Varanasi. In 1885 he was appointed as the principal of Government Sanskrit College, Varanasi.

In 1888, Venis became Principal of Queen's College, and in 1897, he received a Boden Scholarship. He also taught post-Vedic Sanskrit at Allahabad University.

Venis received the CIE in the 1911 Delhi Durbar Honours and was a Member of the Legislative Council of the United Province.

== Works ==
Venis became a fellow of the Asiatic Society of Bengal. Arthur Anthony Macdonell in 1906 described him as "chiefly interested in the traditional side of Indian philosophy". Herbert Niel Randle in a 1926 book review described his work as "in some sense more important to the understanding of Indian logic than that done by any contemporary", because of the emphasis he put on the editing of Nyāya texts.
