= Hiralal Yadav =

Indian folk singer (died 2019)

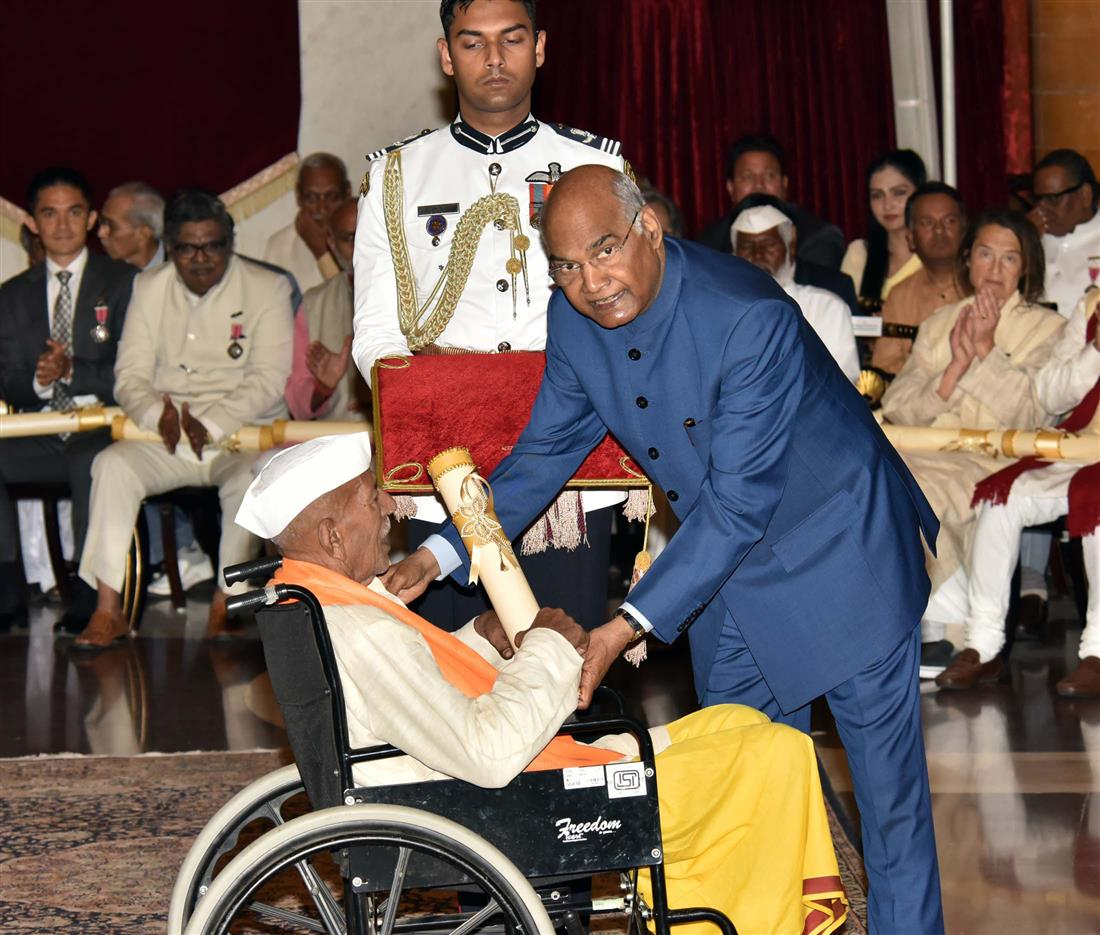
- President Ram Nath Kovind felicitates Hiralal Yadav with Padma Shri

Background information
- Born: 1925/1926
- Origin: Varanasi, India
- Died: 12 May 2019 (aged 93)
- Genres: Kajri, Birha
- Occupations: Singer, musician
- Labels: T-Series, Smithsonian Folkways Recordings / Auvidis-UNESCO, Rama Cassettes
- Awards: Padma Shri (2019); Yash Bharti Award (2015)

Hiralal Yadav (1925/1926 – 12 May 2019) was an Indian folk singer, who was awarded the Padma Shri, the fourth highest civilian award in India in 2019. He was awarded the Yash Bharti Award in 2015.

== Discography ==
=== Selected albums ===
Year	Album's Name	Label
1992	Devar Bhabhi Ki Holi	T-Series
1993	Ram Bhakt Ghurhu Kisan	T-Series
1995	Jhoori Sangram Singh	T-Series
1997	Chabda Chatti Peeta	T-Series
2001	Gadhavat Swami Sadguru Bhajan	T-Series
2014	India: North Indian Folk Music	Smithsonian Folkways Recordings / Auvidis-UNESCO

== Honours ==
- Padma Shri in 2019 from the Government of India
- Yash Bharti Award in 2015 from the Government of Uttar Pradesh
- Tagore Akademi Award in 2011 from the Sangeet Natak Akademi
- Sangeet Natak Akademi Award in 1993-94 from the Sangeet Natak Akademi

== Death ==
At the age of 93, he died on 12 May 2019. PM Narendra Modi paid homage to Hiralal Yadav.

On 14 May 2019, Chief Minister Yogi Adityanath met his family and paid condolence to the family members.

== See also ==
- List of Padma Shri award recipients (2010–2019)
