= Harihar Kripalu Tripathi =

Indian scholar

Harihar Kripalu Tripathi is a Sanskrit scholar, living in Varanasi, India. He was honored with Padma Shri award by the Government of India in 2017

== Life ==
He was born in Rudrapur village near Maihar Devi temple in the Indian state of Madhya Pradesh, Dr. Tripathi received the master's degree (Acharya) from the Sampurnanand Sanskrit Vishwavidyalaya, Varanasi in 1979. He was awarded the "Vidyavaridhi" (Ph.D) Degree from the same university on the topic "Balmanormagarbhit - Tatvabodhinee- Laghushabdendushekharyostulnatmakadhyayanam" in 1989. Observing the importance and utility of his Ph.D, thesis for the student of oriental studies in general and researchers in particulars, the publication Institute of Sampurnanand Sanskrit Vishwavidyalaya, Varanasi published his thesis as book which is one among the best seller books for Sanskrit studies. This work is an original and authentic contribution of Dr. Tripathi to the field of Sanskrit studies.

Dr. Tripathi established a temple of Maa Ashtadashbhuja Devi" in Shiv Shakti Dham Patiya-Varanasi to make beneficiary by connecting the people with "Dharma" in the right way of Humanities, Dr. Tripathi is widely recognize across the society role of public welfare by spiritual and moral education. He is widely known as spiritual header and moral preacher and in public domain he is known by the name of "Guru Ji".

Dr. Tripathi has been publishing the "Viraat" magazine in fields of spirituality and philosophies of ancient shastras for last 15 years. He is fully devoted to guide and educate the scholars of different discipline of Sanskrit language with his expertise.

He was nominated as chairman of Kashi Vishwanath Temple Trust from 2009 to 2012 and he was also the member of the same trust from year 2006 to 2009.
