= Sonbarsa, Ballia =

Sonbarsa
- Village
- Location within Uttar Pradesh Location within India
- Coordinates: 25.7639613°N 84.4890448°E
- Country: India
- State: Uttar Pradesh
- District: Ballia
- Subdistrict: Bairia

Population (2011)
  - Total: 20,735
- Time zone: UTC+05:30 (IST)
- Pincode: 277208

Sonbarsa is a village in Ballia District, Uttar Pradesh, India situated around 39 km from the main city in East direction. The village is connected to the city of Ballia by Bairia Road.

== Sonbarsa 2011 Census detail ==
Sonbarsa local Language is Bhojpuri and hindi. Village total population is 20735 and Female population is 46.6% and Village literacy rate is 69.3%.
