= Ganganath Jha =

Indian philosopher (1872–1941)

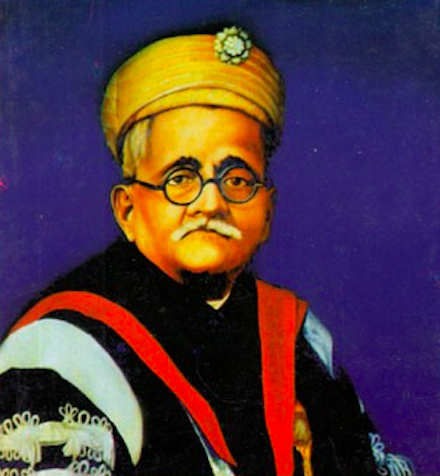
- Born: 25 December 1872; Sarisab-Pahi, Madhubani district, Bihar, British India
- Died: 9 November 1941 (aged 68); Prayagraj, India
- Occupation: Sanskrit scholar

Mahamahopadhyaya Sir Gaṅgānāth Jhā (25 December 1872 – 9 November 1941) was a scholar of Sanskrit, Indian philosophy and Buddhist philosophy.

He is considered to have probably translated more Sanskrit philosophical texts than any other scholar and notable examples of texts he has translated include the Slokavartika (1907), the Tantravarttika (1903-1924) and the Sabara-Bhashya (1933-1936). As per the Dutch orientalist, Jan Willem de Jong, his translations cannot be described as 'elegant or literal" though they render "well enough the general ideas expressed in the text."

== Early life ==
Ganganath Jha was born on the 25th of September, 1871 in the village of Sarisab-Pahi in Madhubani district of Bihar, British India. Through his ancestor, Achyut Jha, Ganganath Jha was related to the ruling family of the Raj Darbhanga estate.

His education along with his brothers, was sponsored by Maharaja Lakshmeshwar Singh of Raj Darbhanga who also happened to be a relative of his. His schooling took place in the Raj School where he was taught in English. Following his schooling, he was sent to the city of Varanasi to study at the Government Sanskrit College where his principal was the German Indologist, George Thibaut. Here he opted for the study of Sanskrit, English and philosophy. During his time here, he also came into contact with the Theosophical Society.

== Librarian of Raj Darbhanga ==
At the age of 24, due to the death of his grandmother, he had to cut his studies in Varanasi short and left for Darbhanga where he was appointed a librarian of the Darbhanga state by its Maharaja. He was paid a salary of Rs. 100 per month. This salary allowed Ganganath to keep his family comfortable. During his time as a librarian, he was contacted by Arthur Venis who requested if he could undertake the translation of the works of Kumārila Bhaṭṭa, an 8th-century Indian philosopher and proponent of the Mīmāṃsā school, into English. With the help of various pandits of the time, he was able to translate various works from Sanskrit into English.

== Allahabad ==
In 1902, he was appointed a Professor of Sanskrit at Muir College in Allahabad following a recommendation from his former principal and associate, George Thibaut and his dismissal from Raj Darbhanga by Maharaja Rameshwar Singh due to some disagreements. During his time here, he undertook a project with Thiabut to translate the following books: KhandanKhanda-Khadya, Advaita Siddhi, Nyaya-Sutra Bhashya and Vartika, Shabara Bhashya and the Vivarna-Prameya Sangraha. Following the completion of these translations, they were published in the quarterly journal, Indian Thought and were well-received.

He left in 1918 to become the first Indian principal of the Government Sanskrit College in Benares. Between 1920 and 1923 he served as a member of the Council of State in the Central British Government of India.

He was vice-chancellor of the University of Allahabad from 1923 to 1932. The University of Allahabad established the Ganganath Jha Hostel in his honour.

== Honors and awards ==
- Honorary Fellow of the Asiatic Society, 1924
- Campbell Memorial Gold Medal, Bombay Branch of the Royal Asiatic Society, 1935
- Knight Bachelor, 1941 Birthday Honours List
- Dhaut Samman, by Maharaja of Raj Darbhanga

== Literary work ==
Sir GN Jha written numerous books and translated many Sanskrit books into English.

=== Books authored ===
- The Prabhakar school of Purva-Mimansa, Allahabad University, 1911.
- Kavi Rahasya, Hindustan Academy Press, Prayag.
- Nyaya Prakash, Nagari Pracharini Sabha, Benares, 1920.
- Vaisveshik Darsha, Nagari Pracharini Sabha, Benares, 1921.
- The Philosophical Discipline, Calcutta University, 1928.
- Sources of Hindu law, Indian Press, Allahabad, 1930.
- Hindu Vidhi Ka Srota, Patna University, 1931.
- Shankar Vedant, Allahabad University, 1939.
- Purva-Mimansa in its sources, Banaras Hindu University, 1942.
- Yoga Darshana, Theosophical Society, Madras.

=== Books translated ===
- Chandogyopanishad, G.A. Nelson & Co., Madras, 1899.
- Yoga-Darsana, Theosophical Publication, Bombay, 1907.
- Gautam ka Nyaya Sutra, Oriental Book Agency, Poona, 1913.
- The Purva-Mimansa Sastra of Jaimini, Pāṇini office, Allahabad, 1916.
- Sloka Vartika, Asiatic Society of Bengal, Calcutta, 1924.
- Tantra-Bhasa, Oriental Book Agency, Poona, 1925.
- Manusmriti, in five Volumes, Calcutta University, 1920–1926.
- Yoga Sar Sangrah, Oriental Book Agency, Poona, 1931.
- Tattvasamgraha of Shantarakshita, (in two Volumes), Baroda Oriental Institute, Baroda, 1936.
- Shabarbhasya, (in three Volumes), Baroda Oriental Institute, Baroda, 1939.

=== Books edited ===
- Memansa Nyaya Prakash, 1904.
- Gautam Ka Nyayasutra, Oriental Book Agency, Poona, 1931.
- Nyayadarshana, Coukhamba Sanskrit Series, Benares, 1925.
- Jyant Bhatt ki Nyayakalika, Sanskrit Bhavan Texts, Benares, 1925.
- Mimansa Paribhasha, Medical Hall Press, Benares, 1905.
- Bhavana Vivek, Govt. Press, Allahabad, 1922.
- Mimansa Mandan, Coukhamba Sanskrit Series, Benares, 1929.
- Manusmriti, Asiatic Society, Bengal.
- Tantra Ratna, Sanskrit Bhavan Texts, Benares, 1930.
- Vad vinod, Indian Press, Allahabad, 1915.
- Khandan Khanda Khadya, Coukhamba Sanskrit Series, Benares, 1914.
- Purush Pariksha, Veledeiyer, Allahabad, 1911.
- Kadambari, Sanskrit Bhavan Texts, Benares.
- Prasanna Raghav Natan, Sanskrit Bhavan Texts, Benares.
- Meghdootam, Sanskrit Bhavan Texts, Benares.

== Ganganath Jha Research Institute ==
Rashtriya Sanskrit Sansthan (Ganganatha Jha Campus), formerly known as Ganganath Jha Research Institute (from 1943 to 1971) and Ganganatha Jha Kendriya Sanskrit Vidyapeeth (from 1971 to 2002 under the Ministry of HRD, Government of India) was founded on 17 November 1943 with a view to perpetuate the name and works of M. M. Dr. Sir Ganganatha Jha (b. 1871 & d.1941), an International figure of Orientology and Indology. This is the research training centre of Rashtriya Sanskrit Sansthan from 2016 to 2017.
