= Gopinath Kaviraj =

Hindu philosopher

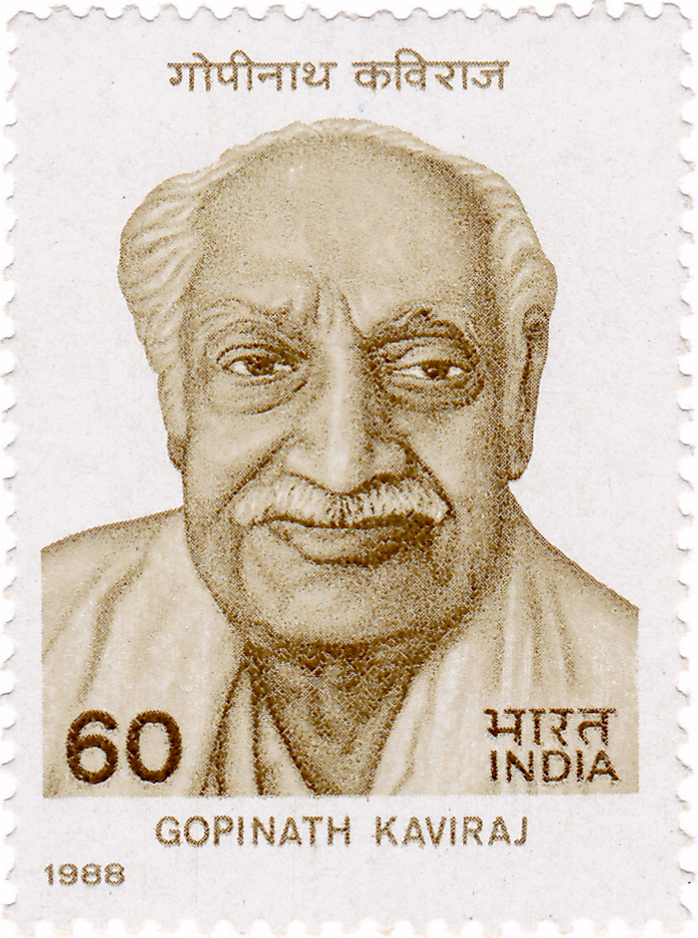
- Gopinath Kaviraj on a 1988 stamp of India
- Born: 7 September 1887; Dhamrai, Bengal Presidency, British India
- Died: 12 June 1976 (aged 88); Varanasi, Uttar Pradesh, India
- Education: University of Allahabad
- Occupations: Principal of Government Sanskrit College, Varanasi (1923–1937); Sanskrit scholar, philosopher
- Father: Vaikunthanath

Gopinath Kaviraj (7 September 1887 – 12 June 1976) was an Indian Sanskrit scholar, Indologist and philosopher. First appointed in 1914 a librarian, he was the Principal of Government Sanskrit College, Varanasi from 1923 to 1937. He was also the editor of the Sarasvati Bhavana Granthamala (Sarasvati Bhavana Texts) during that period.

In 1964 he received the Sahitya Akademi Award, given by the Sahitya Akademi, India's National Academy of Letters, for his research treatise on Tantra, Tantrik Vangmaya Men Shaktadrishti. In the same year he was awarded the Padma Vibhushan, the second highest civilian honour given by Government of India. In 1971 he was conferred the Sahitya Akademi Fellowship, the highest literary honour awarded by the Sahitya Akademi, India's National Academy of Letters.

== Early life and education ==
Kaviraj was the posthumous son of Vaikunthanath, a Bengali scholar of philosophy. He was born in village Dhamrai, in the present Dhaka District, capital of Bangladesh. After receiving his early education at Dhamrai and Kanthalia villages, he joined the K. L. Jubilee High School, Dhaka in seventh class, and studied there till tenth class.

In 1906 he moved to Jaipur, where after four years he obtained a Bachelor of Arts degree from Maharaja College, Jaipur. He obtained his master's degree from the University of Allahabad. Here he studied with scholars Madhusudan Ojha, Shasdhar Tarkchudamani and others. In 1910 he moved to Devnathpura, Varanasi, and started his postgraduate studies, passing the M.A. from the University of Allahabad in 1914, with first merit position in the first class.

== Career ==
The final phase of his education started at Varanasi under the guidance of Arthur Venis, who appointed him as a librarian of the Sarasvati Bhavan Library of the Government Sanskrit College, Varanasi, where he worked from 1914 to 1920. This period allowed him to pursue research in Tantra. It was at Varanasi that Kaviraj was exposed to various facets of ancient Tantric philosophy. In 1918, he met Vishuddhananda Paramahamsa, a Vedic & Tantrik Sadhu in Kashi who guided him in ancient wisdom of Tantra, Yog, Vigyan. Vishuddhanand Paramhamsa was basically from Bengal, stayed in Varanasi for a long time & belonged to the lineage of Gyanganj which is also called Siddhashram since old times and Shambhala in recent times which is near Tibet. (Reference text : Yogiraj Shri Shri Vishuddhanand Paramhamsa)

In 1924 he became principal of the Government Sanskrit College, later Sampurnanand Sanskrit University in Varanasi. He was the Chief Editor of Sarasvati Bhavana Texts, Sarasvati Bhavana Granthamala. However, being more interested in research and his personal spiritual path, he retired from this position in 1937, after the death of his Guru Vishuddhananda Paramhamsa. In the following years, he pursued both his sadhana and scholarly research in Tantra. He also started looking after his Guru's ashram in Varanasi. He was fond of Kashi (Varanasi) and never left it except to accept his Padma Vibhushan. In his later years, along with the scholar Sri Anirvan, he devoted himself to the study of Kashmir Shaivism. In his later years he became an ardent devotee of mystic Anandamayi Ma, whom he first met in 1928.

In 1934 he was awarded the title of Mahamahopadhyaya in recognition of his service Sanskrit scholarship.

Later in life, he remained Head of newly established Yoga-Tantra Department at the Varanaseya Sanskrit Vishwavidyalaya in Varanasi from 1964 to 1969. However, because of failing health, he left it and shifted to Ma Anandamayi Ashram, Bhadaini locality.

== Personal life ==
He was married in 1900 to Kusum Kumari, belonging to a family of Sanskrit scholars of East Bengal. The couple had two children, a son named Jitendranath and a daughter named Sudha. He died on 12 June 1976 at his home in Varanasi, survived by his daughter and grandchildren.

== Books authored ==
- Bhartiya Samskriti Aur Sadhana
- Tantric Vangmaya mein Saktadrsti
- Tantric Sadhana Aur Siddhant
- Sri Krisna Prasanga
- Kashi Ki Saraswat Sadhana
- Patravali
- Sva Samvedan
- Akhanda Mahayoger Pathe
- Visuddhananda Prasanga
- Tantrik Sahitya
- Sadhu Darshan Evam Sat Prasanga
- Gopinath Kaviraj, ed. (1934). The Nrisimha Prasada: Sraddha Sara of Sri Dalapatriraja (in Sanskrit). Vidya Vilas Press, Benaras.
- Gopinath Kaviraj (2006). Yogiraj Vishuddhanand Prasang Tatha Tatva Katha (in Hindi) (2nd ed.).
- Gopinath Kaviraj (1966). Aspects of Indian Thought. University of Burdwan.

== Bibliography ==
- Sri Sri Vishuddhanand Prasanga – An account of the life and mysterious activities of his Spiritual Guru Vishuddhananda Paramhamsa. It also reveals many Secrets of Tantra and Yoga, and refers to Gyanganj
- Yogiraj Shri Shri Vishuddhanand Paramhamsa
- Tantric Sadhana
- Bharatiya Sadhanar Dhara
- Sri Krishna Prasanga
- Mrityubijnan O Karmorahasya
- Tripurarahasyam
- Goraksasiddhantasamgrahah
- Sahityachinta
- Siddhabhoomi Gyanganj – in Bengali. A translated Version in Hindi was published in India by Bharatiya Vidya Prakashan
- Kaviraj, Gopi Nath; Calcutta, University of (1981). Life & philosophy of Mahamahopadhyaya Gopinath Kaviraj: papers presented at the seminar. University of Calcutta.
- Manishi ki Lokyatra(in Hindi)- Bhagavati Prasad Singh. 3rd ed.1987, published from Vishvavidyalaya Prakashan Varanasi (ISBN 9788171245543).

== Awards ==
- Mahamahopadhyaya (1934)
- Padma Vibhushan (1964)
- D.Litt. (1947), by Allahabad University
- Sahitya Vachaspati (1965), by the Uttar Pradesh Government
- Deshikottam (1976), by Visva-Bharati
- D.Litt. (21 December 1956) Banaras Hindu University
- D.Litt. (19 January 1965) Calcutta University, Calcutta
- Sahitya Akademi Award (on Tantrik vangmay mein shakt drishti), 1965
- Sahitya Akademi Fellowship (1971)
- Govt. of India issued a commemorative stamp in honour of Pandit Gopinath Kaviraj.
