= Vagish Shastri =

Indian grammarian and linguist (1935–2022)

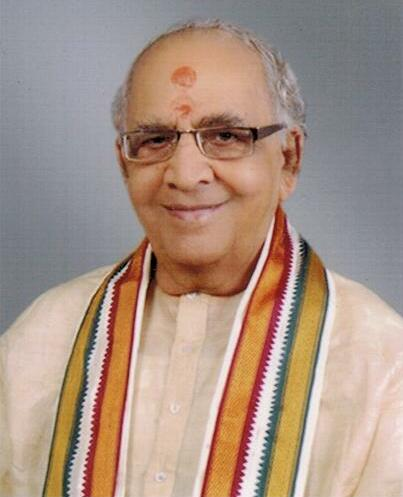
- Born: Bhagirath Prasad Tripathi; 15 July 1935; Khurai, Central Provinces and Berar, British India
- Died: 11 May 2022 (aged 86); Varanasi, Uttar Pradesh, India
- Occupations: Sanskrit grammarian, linguist, yogi
- Spouse: Rekha Tripathi

Vagish Shastri (born Bhagirath Prasad Tripathi; 15 July 1935 – 11 May 2022) was an Indian scholar who specialized in Sanskrit grammar, linguistics, and tantra, as well as yoga. Vagish Shastri was one of the world’s foremost authorities on the Sanskrit language. He developed a method he named Vagyoga. In 2018, the Government of India awarded him the Padma Shri for his contributions to literature and education.

== Biography ==
Vagish Shastri was born in Khurai, a town in the state of Madhya Pradesh of India, in 1934. He received early education in Khurai, Vrindavan, and Benaras (now Varanasi). In 1959, he earned a master's degree in Vyākaraṇa Āchārya (Master of Sanskrit Grammar) and began his career as a Sanskrit educator at Tikmani Sanskrit Grammar College in Varanasi. In 1964, he earned his PhD (Vidyāvāridhi) in Grammar and Historical Linguistics. He received a German diploma in 1966 and a D.Litt. (Vāchaspati) in 1969 from Sampurnanand Sanskrit University. In 1970, he became Director and Professor of the Research Institute at Sampurnanand Sanskrit University, Varanasi and held that position for three decades.

== Contributions ==
Shastri began writing essays at the age of 19. His research and essays on Sanskrit grammar, linguistics, and tantric philosophy have been featured in national and international journals. He served as secretary-president at the fifth World Sanskrit conference and was chief editor of the Sarasvati Bhavana Granthamala. He also edited over 300 manuscripts, which were later published as books. Additionally, he was the chief editor of the Sanskrit journal Sarasvati Susama. His writings covered grammatical and philological research, drama, history, poetry, satire, historical research, and metaphysics.

== Honors and awards ==
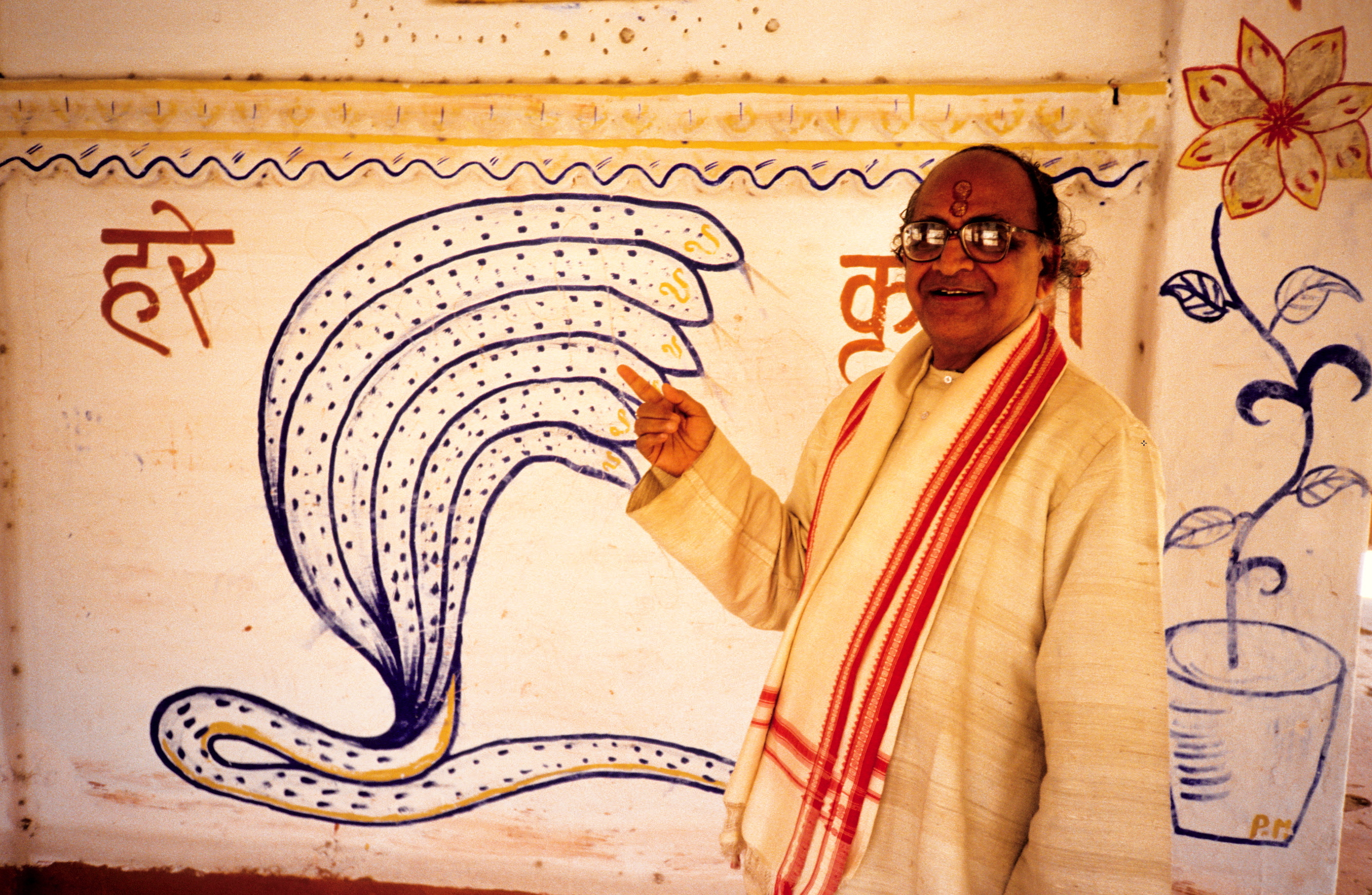
Vagish Shastri

- Padma Shri (2018) – awarded by Ram Nath Kovind
- Senior Research Fellowship (1964–67) – University Grants Commission
- Kālidasa Award (1966–67) – Highest literary Award, Uttar Pradesh
- Honored 6 times by Uttar Pradesh Sanskrit Academy (1968, 1971, 1981, 1985, 1995 and 1996)
- Mahāmahopādhyāya, Śri Kashi Pandit Parishad (1982)
- Bāņa Bhaţţ Award, Uttar Pradesh Sanskrit Academy (1990)
- Veda-Vedānga Award, Rajasthan Sanskrit Academy (1994)
- Anusansdhan Puraskāra (Research Award) – Utkal Pāti trust (1995)
- Swami Vishnu Tirth Sammāna (Spiritual writing Award) – Indore (2002)
- Special Award – Govt. of Uttar Pradesh Sanskrit Sansthan (2005)
- Certificate of Honour for Sanskrit (2013) – awarded by the President of India
- Sauhard Samman – Uttar Pradesh Hindi Sansthan, Lucknow (2014)
- Yash Bharati Samman – Highest Honour of U. P. Govt, Government of Uttar Pradesh (2015)
- Vishva Bharati Samman (2013) – Highest Honour in Sanskrit Work, by U. P. Sanskrit Samsthan, Lucknow
- Mahakavi Kalidas Sanskrit Vrati Samman (2016) – Highest Honour in Sanskrit Work, by Kavikulguru Kalidas Sanskrit University, Nagpur
- Rashtriya Chatrasal Samman (2017) – by Bundeli Sahitya Parishad, Bhopal
- Sanskrit Sadhana Samman – "Maharshi Ved Vyas Samman 2017" (2017) – by Delhi Sanskrit Academy, New Delhi
- Honorary D.Litt., Sampurnanand Sanskrit University, Varanasi (2018)
