= Bedhab Banarasi =

Krishnadev Prasad Gaur
- Born: 11 November 1885; Benaras (now Varanasi), North-Western Provinces, British India
- Died: 6 May 1968 (aged 82)
- Occupations: Hindi novelist and poet
- Writing career
- Pen name: Bedhab Banarasi (बेढब बनारसी)
- Genres: Humour and satire

Bedhab Banarasi ('बेढ़ब' बनारसी) was a Hindi writer of the twentieth century, famous for his witty style of writing.

Bedhab's short stories narrate the turmoil in the life of the middle class of both cities and villages of Indian in the early- to mid-twentieth century.
