= Shiv Prasad Mishra =

Shiv Prasad Mishra Rudra (1911–1970) was an Indian novelist, playwright, columnist, poet and satirist. His texts "Ehi Thaiyan Jhulni Herani ho Rama!" also printed in NCERT Book.

== Personal life ==
Shiv Prasad Mishra Rudra was born into a family of priests in Varanasi Uttar Pradesh. His father Pandit Mahaveer Prasad Mishra and mother Sumitra Devi looked at him as Lord Shiva's grace, hence gave him the name.

== Education and career ==
After his schooling at Harishchandra and Queens Colleges, Varanasi, he went to study at Banaras Hindu University from where he obtained his BA, MA and PhD degrees. He had a long and varied teaching career. The various organizations and institutions that he was associated are: City Basic School, Varanasi, and then Mirzapur etc.; Aj daily newspaper, Harishchandra College, Varanasi etc. In the last phase of his career, in 1959, he became a part of the Department of Hindi in Banaras Hindu University.

== Legacy ==
Bahti Ganga, first published in 1952, is his epochal work. It's a series of historical stories centered on the city of Varanasi covering that span in the history of Varanasi from mid eighteenth century to mid twentieth century.

== Works ==
- Bhasha ki Shiksha, critical work
- Mahakavi Kalidas, play
- Dashshvamedh, play
- Bahti Ganga, short story collection/novel
- Suchitap, novel
- Anthologies of Poems: Ghazalika, Tal Talaiya, Tulsidas, Album.
