= Vidya Niwas Mishra =

Indian journalist and scholar

Vidya Niwas Mishra (28 January 1926 – 14 February 2005) was an Indian scholar, a Hindi-Sanskrit littérateur, and a journalist. He was honoured with Padma Bhushan.

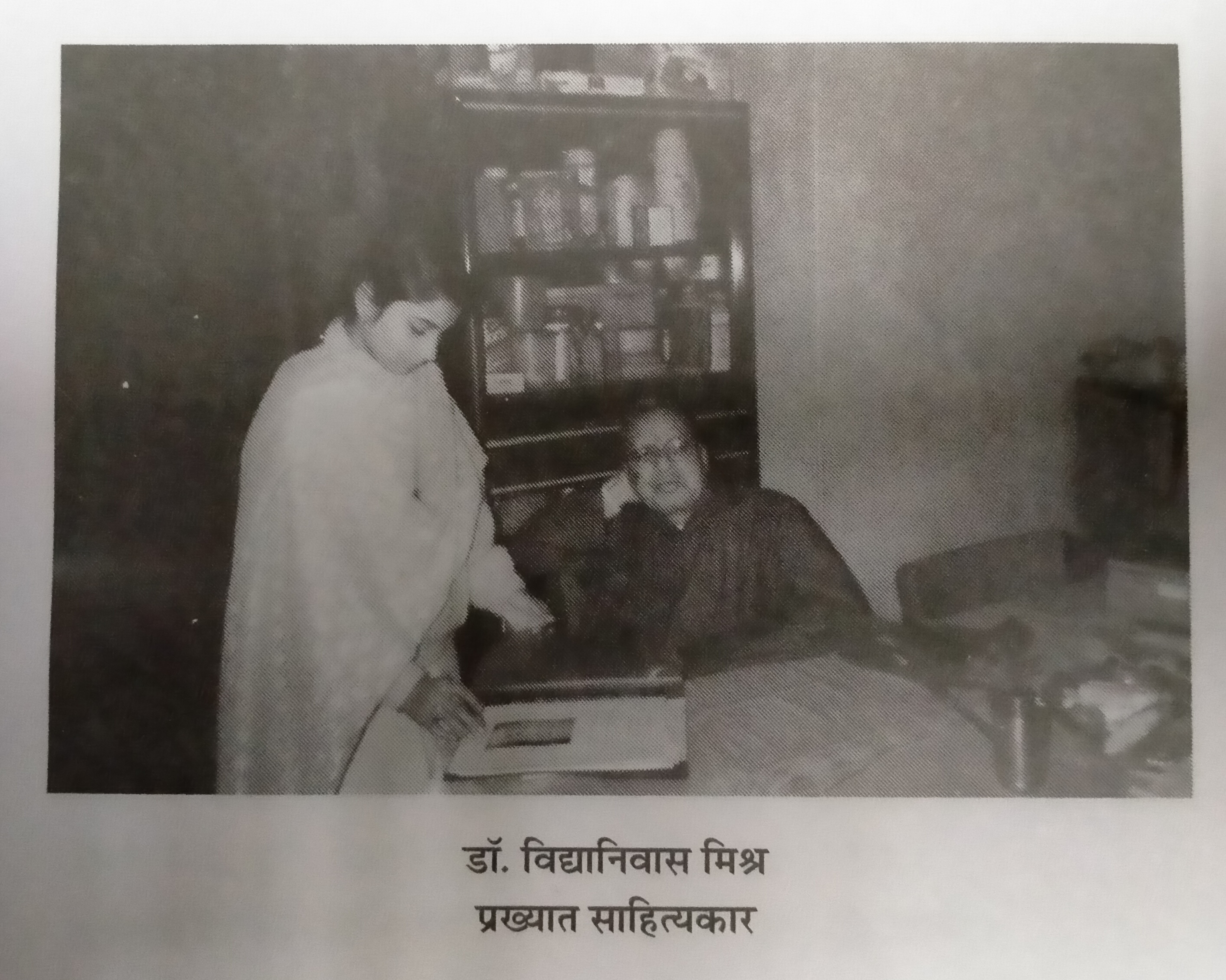
Dr. Vidhyanivas Mishra being interviewed by Dr. Archana Dwivedi

== Life ==
He was born on 14 January 1926 at Pakardiha in Gorakhpur district of Uttar Pradesh. He had his education at Allahabad University and Gorakhpur University. After his M.A. in Sanskrit from Prayag University he involved himself in the work of compiling the Hindi dictionary under the direction of the legendary scholar Rahul Sankrityayan.

A scholar of Hindi and Sanskrit languages, he was also a writer. He authored, edited and translated over hundred books in Hindi and English. He also edited several journals and magazines. He twice served as the president of the Hindi Sahitya Sammelan and was also the chairman of the Sahitya Parishad.

He was a visiting professor at the California and Washington universities, and director of the Kulapati Munshi Hindi Vidyapeeth, Agra. He was also vice-chancellor of the Kashi Vidyapeeth and the Sampurnanand Sanskrit University. For many years, he was the editor-in-chief of the leading Hindi daily Navbharat Times.

For his invaluable services in the field of literature, he was decorated first with Padma Shri and later with Padma Bhushan by the Government of India. He was the recipient of the Moortidevi Prize instituted by the Bharatiya Jnanpeeth. A senior member of the Sahitya Akademi, he was the guiding spirit of many a literary and social organisations. He was closely associated with the ambitious project to bring out an Encyclopedia of Hinduism. The Hindi monthly Sahitya Amrit, of which he was the chief patron, is one of the best literary journals in India.

He was a nominated member of Rajya Sabha. He died 14 February 2005 in a road accident while on his way to Varanasi from Deoria.
