= Netaji Subhas National Institute of Sports =

Academic wing of the Sports Authority of India

- नेताजी सुभाष राष्ट्रीय क्रीड़ा संस्थान
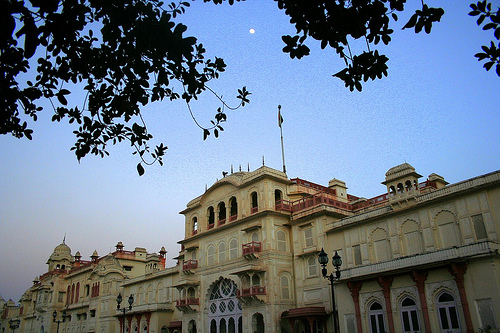
- The Old Moti Bagh Palace, which houses the NSNIS
- Former name: National Institute of Sports
- Type: Government College
- Established: 7 May 1961; 65 years ago
- Founder: Government of India
- Parent institution: Sports Authority of India
- Location: Old Moti Bagh, Moti Bagh, Patiala, Punjab, 147001, India; 30.3081°N 76.3936°E
- Website: nsnis.org
- Location in Patiala

Netaji Subhas National Institute of Sports, commonly known as National Institute of Sports (NIS), is the academic wing of the Sports Authority of India (SAI) and Asia's largest sports institute located in city of Patiala. Is India's first sports museum.

== History ==
Founded on 7 May 1961, the institute was renamed as Netaji Subhas National Institute of Sports in January 1973. It was merged with SAI in 1987. Spread over 268 acres, NIS is housed in the Old Moti Bagh Palace of the erstwhile royal family of Patiala State, which was purchased by Government of India after Indian Independence.

== NIS Directors ==
S. No.	Name	Tenure
1.	M. K. Kaul	7 May 1961 – 18 May 1961
2.	Sant Singh	18 May 1961 – 17 July 1964
3.	M. S. Chopra	17 July 1964 – 30 April 1967
4.	B. S. Jaiswal	30 April 1967 – 14 Jan 1970
5.	M. C. Dhawan	14 Jan 1970 – 2 June 1970
6.	S. D. Chopra	2 June 1970 – 3 July 1970
7.	Roshan Lal Anand	4 July 1970 – 30 Nov 1986
8.	S. K. Chaturvedi	30 Nov 1986 – 13 Dec 1986
9.	C. M. Muthiah	13 Dec 1986 – 30 April 1990
10.	D. K. Tondon	30 April 1990 – 30 May 1995
11.	D. N. Mathur	30 May 1995 – 2 Feb 1996
12.	ASV Prasad	2 Feb 1996 – 30 June 1998
13.	O. P. Bhatia	30 June 1998 – 2 Dec 1998
14.	Gurbux Singh	2 Dec 1998 – 30 June 1999
15.	B. S. Ahluwalia	30 June 1999 – 30 April 2004
16.	B. K. Sinha, IPS	30 April 2004 – 16 Nov 2004
17.	M. P. Ganesh	16 Nov 2004 – 31 July 2006
18.	L. S. Ranawat	31 July 2006 – 31 Oct 2014
19.	S. S. Roy	31 October 2014 – 14 Nov 2019
20.	Raj Singh Bishnoi	16 Nov 2019 – Present

== Memorabilia ==
Today, several items of sports memorabilia, like a hass weighing 95 kg, used by The Great Gama, Major Dhyan Chand's gold medal from the 1928 Amsterdam Olympics, and PT Usha's 1986 Seoul Asiad shoes, are housed at the National Institute of Sports Museum.

== Departments ==
1. Department of sports medicine
2. Department of exercise physiology
3. Department of sports biochemistry
4. Department of sports anthropometry
5. Department of sports psychology
6. Department of sports nutrition
7. Department of General theory & methods of training
8. Department of biomechanics
