= Sampurnanand Sanskrit Vishwavidyalaya =

Indian university in Varanasi, Uttar Pradesh

Coordinates: 25.3327°N 82.9967°E

- Seal of Sampurnanand Sanskrit Vishwavidyalaya
- Former names: Varanaseya Sanskrit Vishwavidyalaya; Government Sanskrit College, Varanasi
- Motto: Śrutam me gopāya
- Motto in English: Let my learning be safe
- Type: State
- Established: 1791 (235 years ago)
- Affiliations: UGC
- Chancellor: Governor of Uttar Pradesh
- Vice-Chancellor: Bihari Lal Sharma
- Location: Varanasi, Uttar Pradesh, India
- Campus: Urban
- Website: www.ssvv.ac.in

Sampurnanand Sanskrit Vishwavidyalaya (IAST: Sampūrṇānand Saṃskṛta Viśvavidyālaya, Vāraṇāsī; formerly Varanaseya Sanskrit Vishwavidyalaya and Government Sanskrit College, Varanasi) is an Indian university and institution of higher learning located in Varanasi, Uttar Pradesh. It is one of the largest Sanskrit universities in the world. The university offers a range of undergraduate and postgraduate programs in various disciplines. The university has been accredited by NAAC and recognized by UGC.

== History ==
In 1791, during the Benares State, a resident of the East India Company, Jonathan Duncan, proposed the establishment of a Sanskrit college for the development and preservation of Sanskrit Vangmaya (eloquence) to demonstrate British support for Indian education. The initiative was sanctioned by governor general Charles Cornwallis. The first teacher of the institution was Pandit Kashinath and the governor general sanctioned a budget of ₹20,000 per annum. The first principal of Government Sanskrit College was John Muir, followed by James R. Ballantyne, Ralph T. H. Griffith, George Thibaut, Arthur Venis, Sir Ganganath Jha and Gopinath Kaviraj.

In 1857, the college began postgraduate teaching. An examination system was adopted in 1880. In 1894, the famous Saraswati Bhavan Granthalaya building was built, where thousands of manuscripts remain preserved today. These manuscripts have been edited by the principal of the college and published in book form. More than 400 books have been published in a series known as Sarasvati Bhavana Granthamala.

In 1958, the efforts of Sampurnanand changed the status of the institution from that of a college to a university. In 1974, the name of the institution was formally changed to Sampurnanand Sanskrit University.

== Departments ==
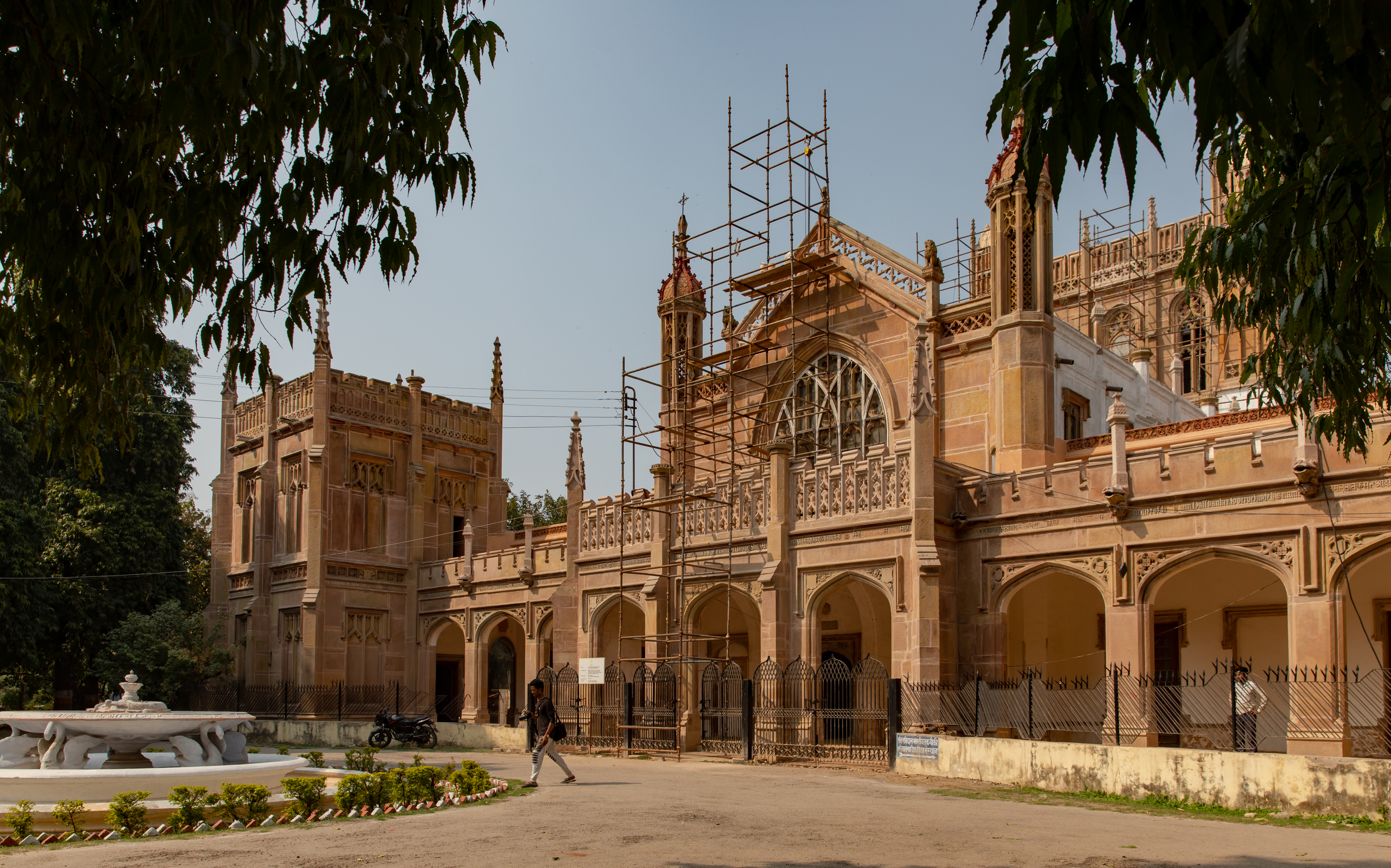
Sampurnanand Sanskrit University Headquarters

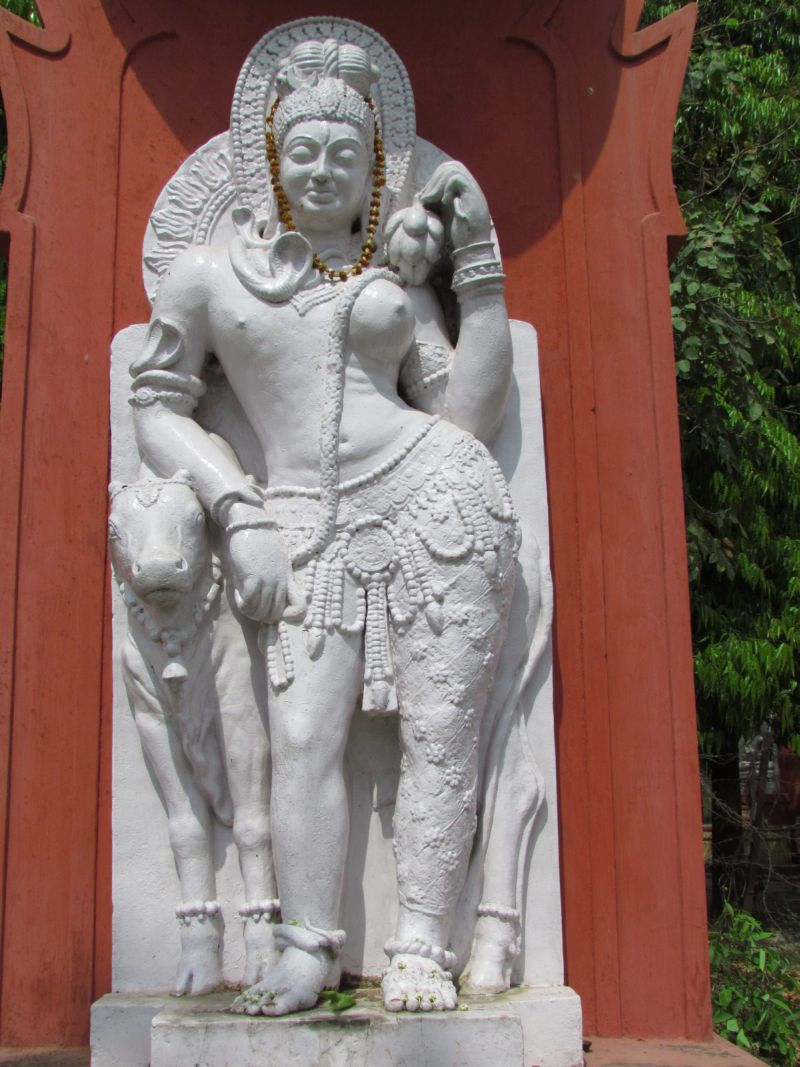
A contemporary Ardhanarishvara statue at Sampurnanand Sanskrit University

=== Adhunika Gyan Vijyana ===
- Department of Education
- Department of Library Science
- Department of Modern Languages and Linguistics
- Department of Science
- Department of Social Sciences

=== Philosophy ===
- Department of Comparative Religion and Philosophy
- Department of Mimamsa
- Department of Nyaya-Vaishesika
- Department of Sankhya-Yoga-Tantragama
- Department of Vedanta

=== Sahitya Sanskriti ===
- Department of Puranetihasa
- Department of Sahitya
- Department of Prachina Rajashastra-Arthashastra

=== Shramana Vidya ===
- Department of Baudha Darshana
- Department of Jaina Darshana
- Department of Pali and Theravada
- Department of Prakrita and Jainagama
- Department of Sanskrita Vidya

=== Veda-Vedanga ===
- Department of Dharma Shastra
- Department of Veda
- Department of Jyotisha (Astrology)
- Department of Vyakarana

== Research Institute ==
When the institution was known as Sanskrit College, all research activities were carried out by the principal. This included the work done on manuscripts that were kept in the Saraswati Bhavan Granthalaya.

After the institution became a university, all research work was supervised by the director of the Research Institute, who is also the chief editor of the famous book series Sarasvati Bhavana Granthamala and the journal Sārasvatī Suṣamā.

The director is responsible for overseeing all research activities within the university, and serves as its academic head. Being a director, the renowned grammarian Vagish Shastri had made valuable contributions to the Sanskrit journal Sārasvatī Suṣamā and edited numerous books in the Sarasvati Bhavana Granthamala series.

== Affiliation ==
Sampurnanand Sanskrit Vishwavidyalaya is a university in India that comprises over 600 schools and colleges. The medium of instruction in these educational institutions is Sanskrit, Hindi, and English. It is the sole university in India that boasts of such extensive affiliation throughout the country. The state wise affiliated colleges' statistics are as follows:

No.	State	No. of affiliated colleges
1	Arunachal Pradesh	1
2	Bihar	10
3	Delhi	7
4	Gujarat	2
5	Haryana	7
7	Himachal Pradesh	1
6	Jammu and Kashmir	1
7	Maharashtra	4
8	Punjab	1
9	Rajasthan	4
10	Sikkim	5
11	Uttar Pradesh	554
12	West Bengal	6

== Notable alumni ==
- Swami Avimukteshwaranand Saraswati

== See also ==
- List of educational institutions in Varanasi
- List of Sanskrit universities in India
- Sanskrit revival
