= Pankaj Prasun =

Hindi poet, satirist, and author

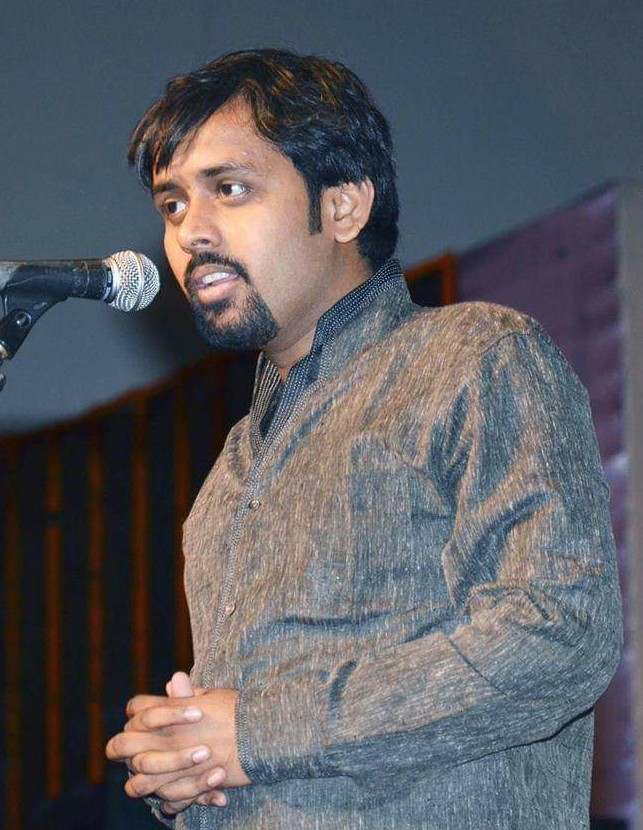
- Pankaj Prasun in 2013 in a Kavi Sammelan held in Sahara City Lucknow
- Born: 2 January 1984 (age 42); Raebareli, Uttar Pradesh
- Citizenship: India
- Occupations: Poet, humorist, satirist, author
- Website: www.pankajprasun.com

Pankaj Prasun (born 2 January 1984, Hindi: पंकज प्रसून) is a Hindi poet, satirist, humorist and author from India. He is known for his unique style and language of humorous Hindi poetry in India. His weekly column "Prasun Ke Punch" published in Navbharat Times news paper. He is in the organizing team committee in Lucknow Literary Festival.

Prasun was selected for India Today top 30 youth icons in 2019 in the field of Art and Culture along with 30 designated youth. Pankaj Prasun was invited to recite poetry at the Cambridge International Poetry Symposium organized by the University of Cambridge, where he represented India.

Pankaj Prasun was specially invited in the centenary celebrations of the University of Lucknow where he presented a cocktail of Science Satire and poetry -Scientainment for the first time.

Anupam kher recited Pankaj Prasun's poetry Ladkiyan Badi Ladaka Hoti Hain from Times Squares New York on the occasion of International Women's Day 2020. He recited for the second time his poem Maa Ka Buna Sweater dedicated to his mother Dulari. For the third time, he posted Pankaj Prasun's poem about his book 'Your Best Day is Today'. Remembering his father on his 9th Death Anniversary, he presented a poem written by Pankaj Prasun and posted it on social media.

== Early life and career ==
Pankaj was born in 1984 in Raebareli, Uttar Pradesh. He has done his education from University of Lucknow. He is working as a technical officer at Central Drug Research Institute, Lucknow. He has recited his poetry during Kavi sammelan on various institutions such as IIT (Kanpur, Delhi, Roorki), BRD Medical College Gorakhpur, Red Fort and other cities across the India.

Pankaj Prasun has conducted the workshop of Science Poetry for students across the Nation during India International Science Festival. He has started his poetry with science poems and now best known for his science poetry. He is the first person to write comic poems and satires on science. His poems like: Kaise bane sahara dil, Blood pumping ka mara dil, Pyaar ghata hai, fat badha hai, Cholestrol ka maara Dil, have made him one of the most notable science poets in India.

Pankaj Prasun has recited his humorous poetry at SAB TV show Wah! Wah! Kya Baat Hai!. He also performed at KV sammelan on Aaj Tak. He regularly appears on various news channels, All India Radio and various radio stations.

Pankaj prasun was convenor and conductor of the first Science poet Conference (Vigyan kavi sammelan) of India held at Dr. Shakuntala Misra National Rehabilitation University, Lucknow Organised by CSIR-NISCAIR, UP Bhasha Sansthan with Indian Science Writers Association.

== Bibliography ==
- Prasun, Pankaj (20 July 2019). Da Lampatganj (in Hindi). Diamond Pocket Books Pvt Limited. ISBN 978-93-5296-792-6.
- Prasun, Pankaj (20 March 2014). Janhit Mein Jaari (in Hindi). Hind Yugm. ISBN 978-93-81394-75-5.
- Prasun, Pankaj (1995). Rochak vichitra satya (in Hindi). Hind Pocket Books.
- "Parmanu Ki chhanv Mein", Published: Mittal & Sons (2017), ISBN 978-93-83862-41-2
- "Hansi Ka Password", Published: Read Publication (2022), ISBN 9789387599482
- "Panch Prapanch" Editor: Sushil Siddharth, Author: Pankaj Prasun, Published: Ayan Prakashan (2017), ISBN 978-81-7408-967-0
- "Vyangya Battisi" edited by Sushil Siddharth, Author: Pankaj Prasun, Vanika Publication, ISBN 978-81-93285-25-1
- "Hanste Huye Rona" edited by Prem Janmejay, Author: Pankaj Prasun, Sanjana Publication, ISBN 978-81-92955-93-3
- "Sushil se Siddharth Tak" Edited by Rahul Dev, Author: Pankaj Prasun, Vanika Publication, ISBN 978-93-86436-45-0
- "Vyangaykaron Ka Bachpan" Edited by Sushil Siddharth, Author: Pankaj Prasun, Vanika Publication, ISBN 978-93-86436-29-0

== Awards and honors ==
- "Kavishala Newspark Award 2025"
- "Asia Book of Records" for his book "Parmanoo ki Chanv Mein"
