= Bharat Mata =

National personification of India

- National personification of India
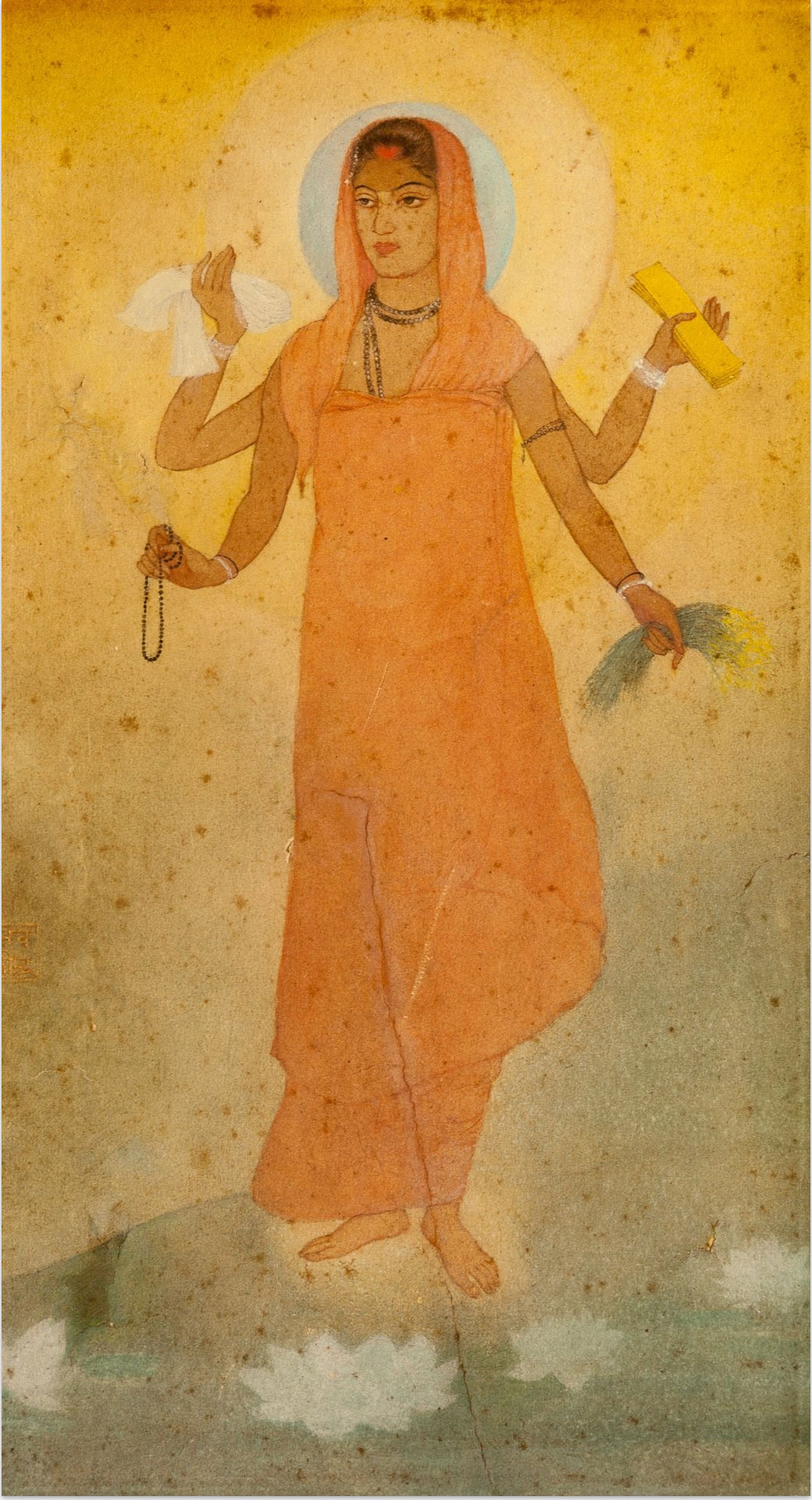
- Bharat Mata painting by Abanindranath Tagore
- Other names: Mother India
- Mantra: Bharat Mata ki Jai
- Artifacts: Red or saffron-colored sari, Indian flag
- Sacred flower: Lotus
- Mount: Asiatic Lion
- Texts: Anandamath (1882)
- Gender: Female
- Region: India
- Temples: Few temples in India, first inaugurated in Varanasi in 1936 by Mahatma Gandhi

Bharat Mata (Bhārat Mātā, Mother India) is a national personification of India as a mother goddess and a symbol of Indian nationalism. She is commonly depicted wearing a red or saffron sari, sometimes holding the national flag, and accompanied by a lotus and a lion.

The concept originated in the Bengali literature and art in the late 19th century and was popularised by Bankim Chandra Chatterjee's 1882 novel Anandamath. She subsequently became an important symbol during the Indian independence movement and became widely represented in Indian art, posters, magazines and calendars. There are several Bharat Mata temples in India, the first of which was inaugurated by Mahatma Gandhi in Varanasi in 1936.

== History ==
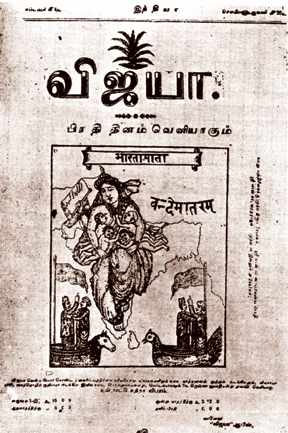
Cover of a 1909 issue of the Tamil magazine Vijaya showing "Bharat Mata"

The term "Bharat" was used in ancient Hindu literature to denote the Bharatha people, and the earliest use of the word to represent a larger territory dates to the first century BCE. The concept of Bharat Mata as a national personification originated in the Bengali literature and art in the late 19th century. The character of Adhi-Bharat in the satirical play Unabimsa Purana, written by Bhudev Mukhopadhyay and first published anonymously in 1866, introduced the concept of a mother of all Indians. Bharat Mata, a play by Kiran Chandra Banerjee, was first performed in 1873. The play is set during Great Bengal famine of 1770, in which a couple prays to Bharat Mata, who emboldens them to lead a rebellion against the British Raj. The concept was later popularised by Bankim Chandra Chatterjee in his novel Anandamath (1882), which also introduced the slogan Vande Mataram, which became closely associated with Bharat Mata.

Abanindranath Tagore painted an image of Banga Mata (Mother of Bengal) during the Swadeshi Movement in 1905. It was later renamed as Bharat Mata on the suggestion of Sister Nivedita. In 1909, an image of Bharat Mata, accompanied by a rough map of India, was published on the cover of the Tamil magazine Vijaya run by Subramania Bharati. She subsequently became an important symbol during the Indian independence movement and became widely represented in Indian art, posters, magazines and calendars.

== Iconography and depiction ==
Chatterjee depicted Bharat Mata in a form inseparable from the Hindu goddesses Durga and Kali. Tagore portrayed Bharat Mata as a four-armed goddess clad in a saffron-coloured sari, with a halo behind her head, holding manuscripts, sheaves of rice, a mala, and a white cloth. In Bharati's visualisation, she is depicted as holding and nourishing four children with her arms. She was often depicted with a sacred lotus and a lion, a symbol associated with Durga. In later versions, she is often depicted with a saffron flag, which was replaced by the tricolour Indian flag when she became a symbol of Indian nationalism. Her image was also accompanied by a map of India to represent her as a personification of the land. Bharat Mata ki Jai ("Victory for Mother India") is often used as an expression in conjunction with the image.

== Significance ==
While initially associated with the Indian freedom movement, Bharat Mata later became a national personification of India. Nivedita opined that Tagore's picture of Bharat Mata was refined and imaginative, with her standing on green earth and with a blue sky behind her, her feet resting on four lotuses, four arms symbolising divine power, a white halo, and sincere eyes. She also described Bharat Mata as offering the gifts of Shiksha-Diksha-Anna-Bastra from the motherland to her children. Bipin Chandra Pal wrote in The Soul of India in 1911 that Bharat Mata embodied the collective spirit and resilience of the Indian people. He elaborated its meaning in idealising and idealist terms, along with Hindu philosophical traditions and devotional practices.

== Association with religion and worship ==
While Bharat Mata became a symbol of Indian nationalism, her initial iconography was based on Hindu goddesses. Her image entered religious practice and became associated with Hindu nationalism. Her depiction as a Hindu goddess might have been intended to evoke the religious duty of Hindus to participate in the nationalist struggle to defend the nation. However, this personification as a woman has caused controversy among some Muslims and Sikhs, whose belief in one God precludes them from attributing divinity to a human figure or worshipping God in human form.

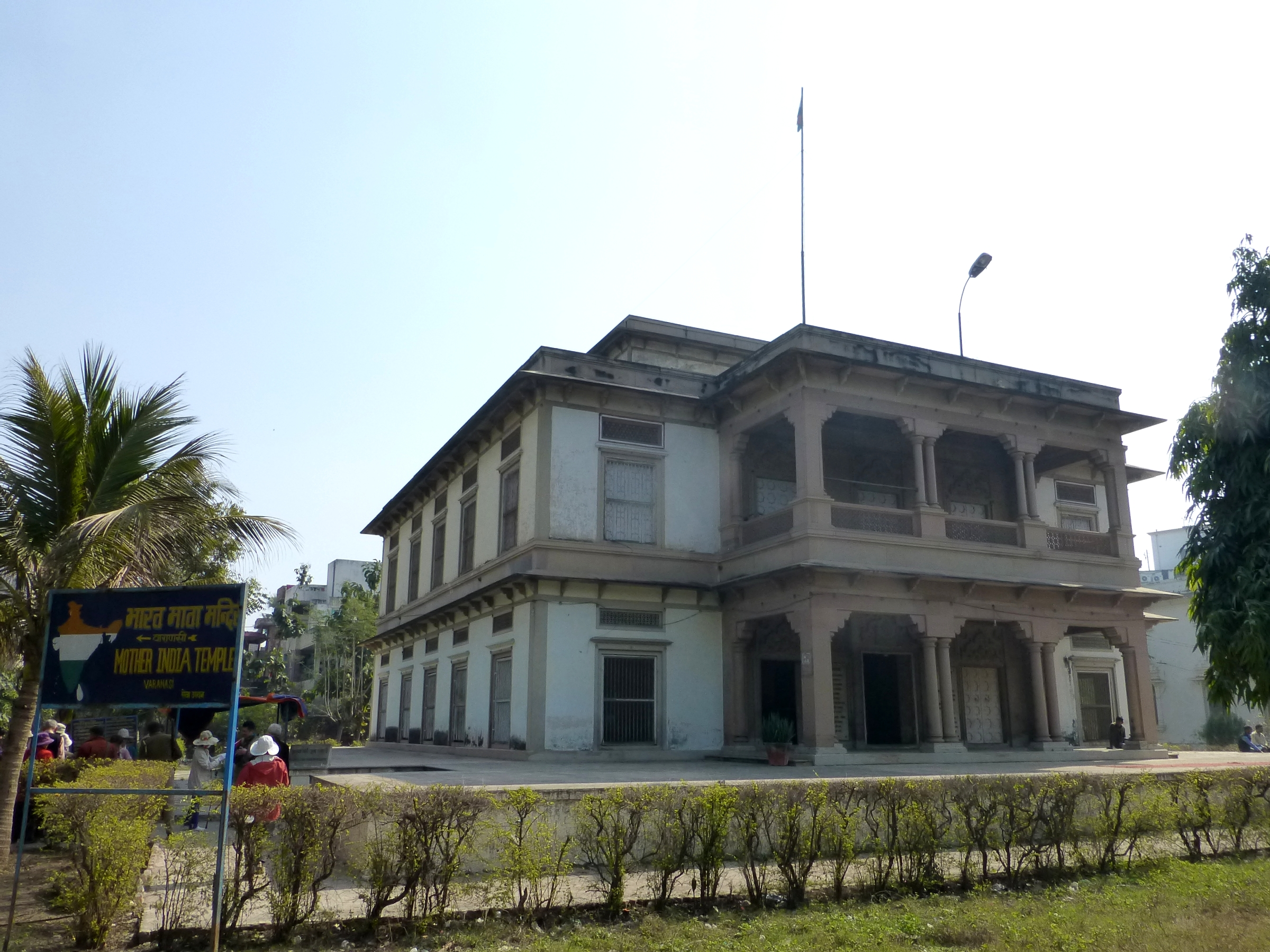
Bharat Mata Mandir at Varanasi

The first Bharat Mata Temple was established by Shiv Prasad Gupta in Varanasi and was inaugurated by Mahatma Gandhi in 1936. This temple does not have any idols and houses a marble relief map of India on its floor. A poem written for the inauguration by the poet Maithili Sharan Gupt is displayed on its wall. During its inauguration, Gandhi said, "I hope this temple, which will serve as a cosmopolitan platform for people of all religions, castes, and creeds including Harijans, will go a great way in promoting religious unity, peace, and love in the country."

In 1983, a temple dedicated to Bharat Mata was founded by Swami Satyamitranand on the banks of the Ganges in Haridwar. The 180 ft (55 m)-tall temple has eight floors dedicated to mythological legends, religious deities, freedom fighters, and leaders. A Bharat Mata temple was inaugurated in Kolkata on 19 October 2015. The temple was built by the Spiritual Society of India to mark the 140th anniversary of Vande Mataram. In the temple, Bharat Mata is portrayed as Jagattarini Durga. In July 2019, the Chief Minister of Haryana granted 5 acres (2.0 ha) of land at Jyotisar to the Bharat Mata Trust to construct a temple for Bharat Mata.

== See also ==
- Bangamata – Personification of Bengal
- National god – Guardian deity of an ethnic group or political unit
- Tamil Thai – Personification of the Tamil language
- Telugu Thalli – Female personification of the Telugu people
- Telangana Thalli – Statue representing the people of Telangana
