= Bharat Mata Mandir =

Hindu Temple in Uttar Pradesh, India

- भारत माता मंदिर
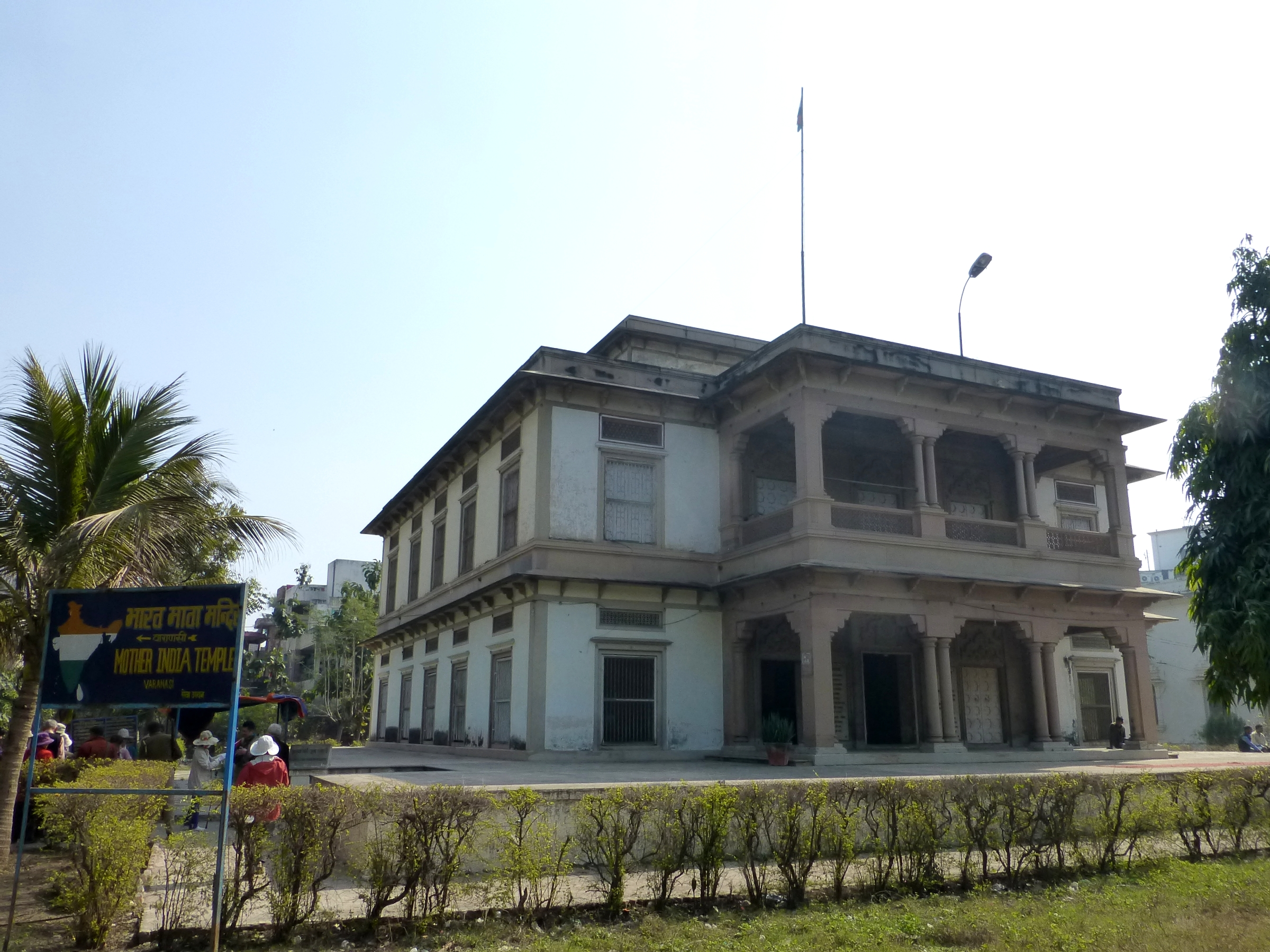

- Temple location on Varanasi district map Bharat Mata Mandir (Uttar Pradesh) Bharat Mata Mandir (India)

Religion
- Affiliation: Indian Nationalism
- District: Varanasi
- Deity: Bharat Mata (India, deified)

Location
- Location: Mahatma Gandhi Kashi Vidyapith, Varanasi
- State: Uttar Pradesh
- Country: India
- Interactive map of Bharat Mata Mandir
- Coordinates: 25.317209°N 82.989291°E

Architecture
- Creator: Babu Shiv Prasad Gupta
- Completed: 1936
- Elevation: 83.67 m (275 ft)

Bharat Mata Mandir (meaning "Mother India Temple") is located on the Mahatma Gandhi Kashi Vidyapith campus in Varanasi, Uttar Pradesh, India. Instead of traditional statues of gods and goddesses, the temple has a large map of Akhand Bharat carved in marble. The temple is dedicated to Bharat Mata and was originally the only one of its kind in the world.

The temple was inaugurated by Mahatma Gandhi in 1936. Gandhi said: "In this temple there are no statues of gods and goddesses. Here there is only a map of India raised on marble. I hope that this temple will take the form of a worldwide platform for all religions, along with Harijans, and of all castes and beliefs, and it would contribute to feelings of religious unity, peace and love in this country." Khan Abdul Ghaffar Khan and Vallabhbhai Patel were also at the inauguration.

It is on the campus of Mahatma Gandhi Kashi Vidyapith.

== Construction ==
The Bharat Mata Mandir structure is built of stone. It has a marble statue of Bharat Mata (India personified as a goddess), symbolizing Akhand Bharat. The temple houses a relief map of India also carved out of marble. The map depicts the mountains, plains and oceans up to scale. It has no murti (idol of a god).

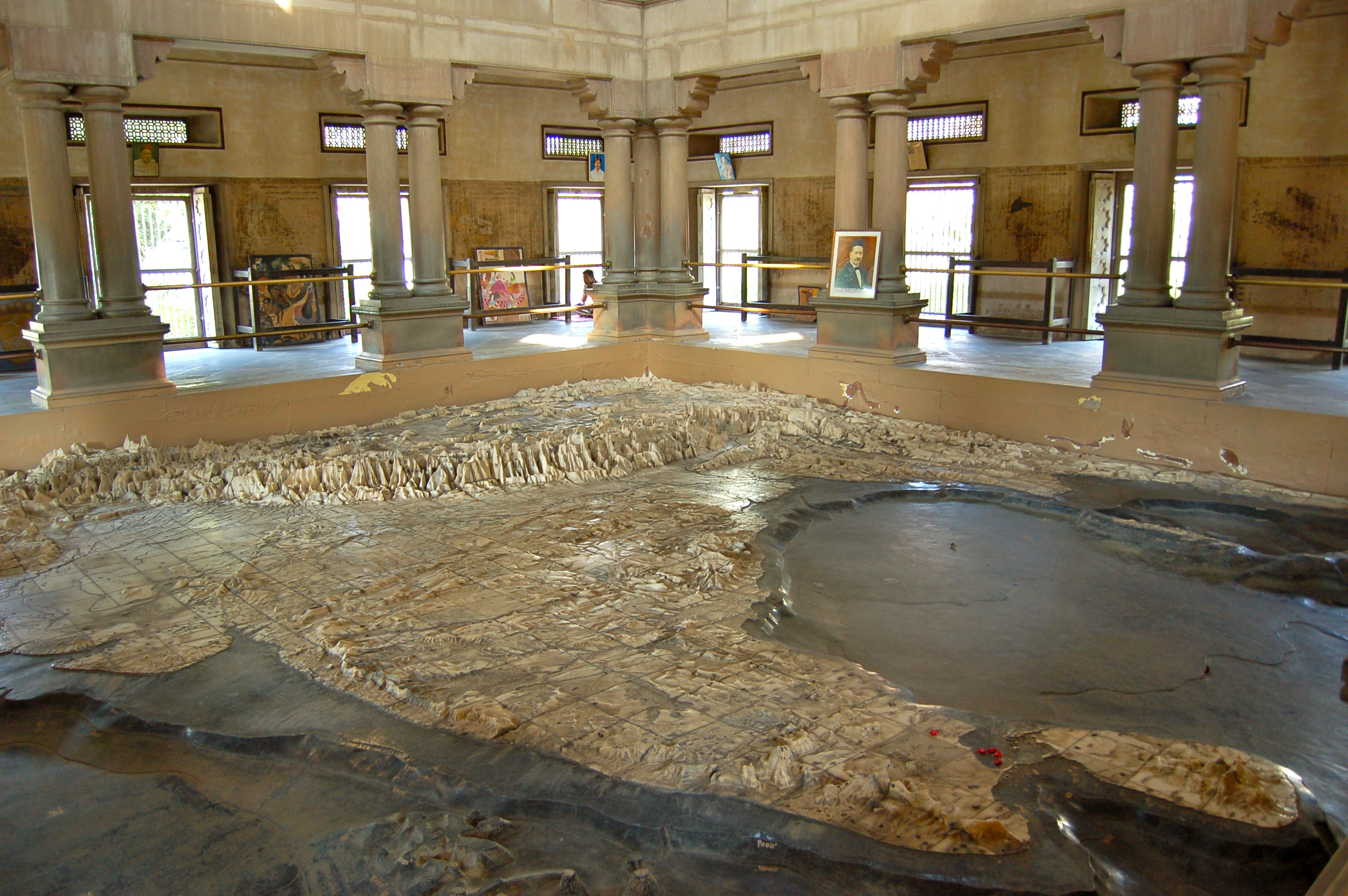
The relief map of India

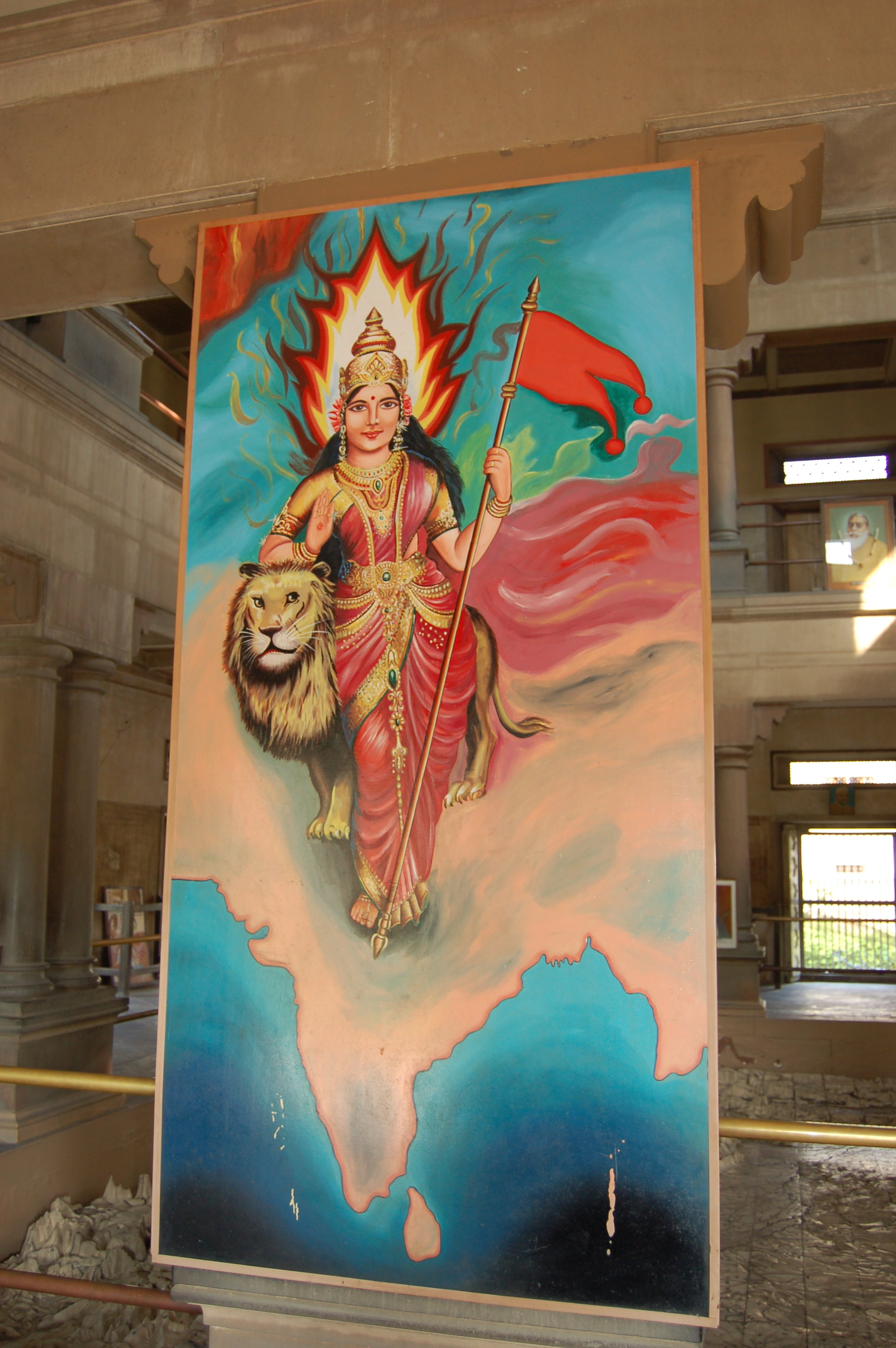
Bharat Mata picture in the temple

== See also ==
- List of Hindu temples in Varanasi
- Swami Satyamitranand
