= M. Srisha =

Tamil playback singer

- Occupations: Rifle shooting, Playback singer
- Spouse: Nitin Jey (husband)
- Parents: Mohandoss (father); Manimekalai Mohan (mother)

M. Srisha is an Indian Tamil playback singer and a state level shooting champion. She hails from Coimbatore, Tamil Nadu.

== Early life and education ==
Srisha started training for vocals at an early age of 8 and studied at SSVM institute. She got a chance to release her first album with music compose Dhina and launched multiple albums.

== Career ==
Srisha launched her first album - Puthiya Bharathi - at the age of 15 which was based on the poems of Subramania Bharathi. She further launched her second album Ashtmala and then third one named Srigadipen, in which she collaborated with singer-composer Srinivas. Her latest album is Aruyire where she has collaborated with lyricist Madhan Karky and musician Dharan Kumar. At the same time, Srisha practices shooting and won numerous awards. She decided to switch to peep sight and is preparing for Olympics.

== Awards and recognition ==
- Gold medal and winning the Tamil Nadu State Shooting Championship at Madurai
- State record in the Sub Junior & Women category.
- Gold in the 10m open sight air rifle in the 16{+t}{+h} at All India Kumar Surendra Singh inter-school shooting championship, Pune
