= Naheed =

Naheed is a given name. Notable people with the name include:

- Naheed Abidi, Indian scholar of Sanskrit and writer
- Naheed Akhtar, Pakistani playback singer
- Kishwar Naheed (born 1940), feminist Urdu poet from Pakistan
- Naheed Nenshi (born 1972), Canadian politician and 36th mayor of Calgary, Alberta
- Naheed Qasimi, Pakistani writer and literary critic
- Naheed Shabbir, Pakistani television actress and model

== See also ==
- Azra Naheed Medical College, private college of medicine, pharmacy and physiotherapy located on Raiwind Road, Lahore, Punjab, Pakistan
- Nasheed
