= Panjali Sabatham =

Tamil poem by Subramania Bharati

Panchali Sabatham
- Author: Subramania Bharati
- Language: Tamil
- Publication place: India

Panchali Sabatham (Tamil: பாஞ்சாலி சபதம், lit. 'Panchali's Vow') is a Tamil epic by the poet Subramania Bharati. The poem retells the events of the episode of the game of dice from the Mahabharata. Bharati uses the incidents from the Mahabharata to draw parallels with the Kurukshetra War and the Indian War of Independence and Panchali (Draupadi) with Bharata Mata.

It is popularly known for emphasizing liberation of women from oppression and remains as one of the well known feminist works in Tamil literature.

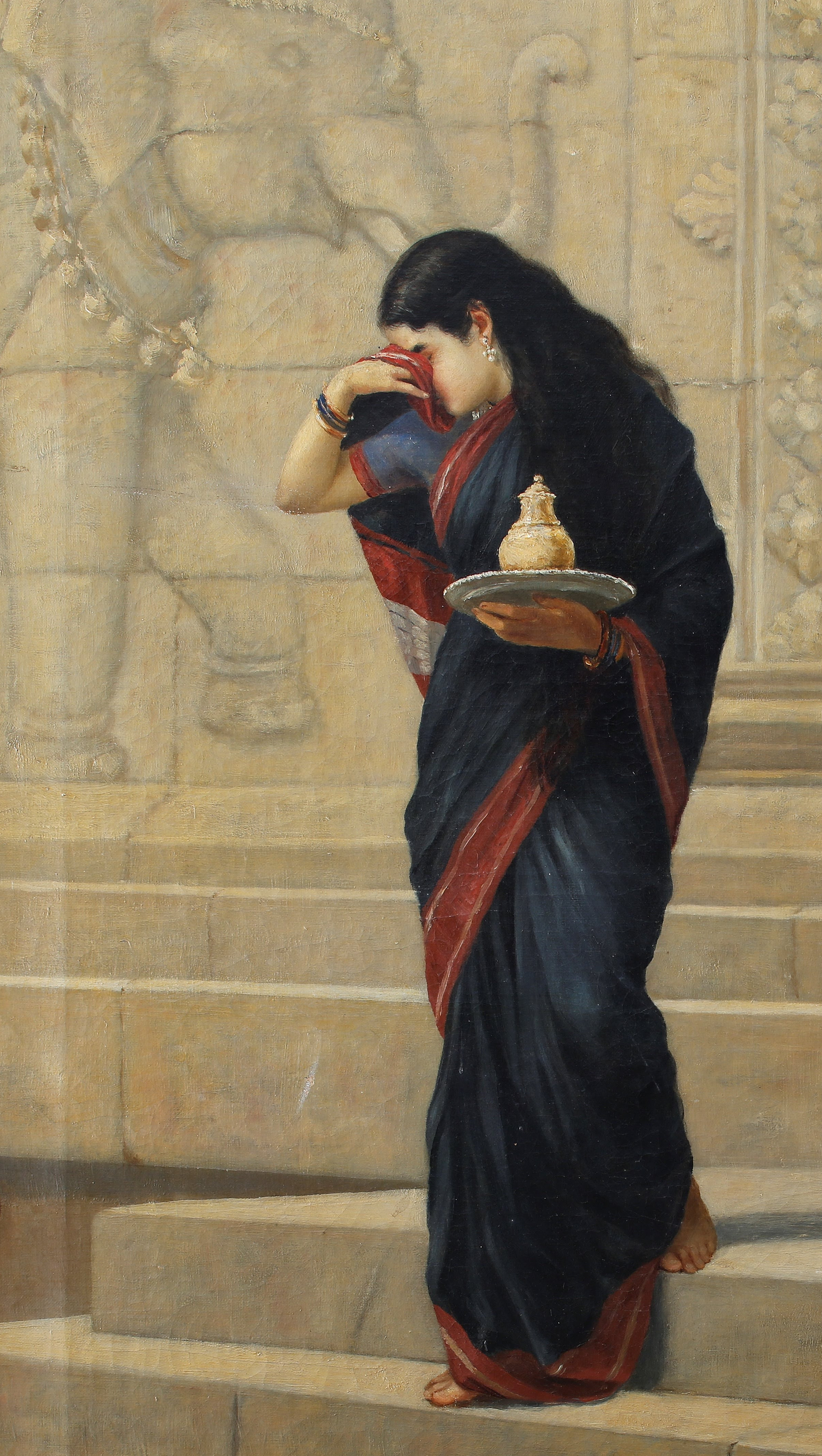
Draupadi, also known as Panchali, the protagonist of the Panchali Sabatham.

== Structure ==
Panchali Sabatham is divided into two major parts and is further sub-divided into five sarukkam (chapter) namely:

1. சூழ்ச்சிசருக்கம் (Suḻcchi-carukkam) - Plotting Chapter
2. சூதாட்டச்சருக்கம் (Suudhatta-carukkam) - Gambling Chapter
3. அடிமைச்சருக்கம் (Adimai-carukkam) - Slavery Chapter
4. துகிலுரிதல் சருக்கம் (Thugilurithal Sarukkam) - Harassment Chapter
5. சபதச்சருக்கம் (Sabatha-carukkam) - Vow Chapter.

The epic contains a total of 412 poems. It is written in 'pa' meter called 'sindhu'.

== Stage play adaptation ==
The epic was adapted into a stage play by S. V. Sahasranamam for his stage troupe Seva Stage, which had its first show on 15 February 1969. N. R. Shanthini played Draupadi, R. Muthuraman played Duryodhana, A. K. Veerasamy played Dhritarashtra, and Sahasranamam played Subramaniya Bharati. In later shows, Sahasranamam played Yudhishtra, Gandhimathi played Draupadi and M. Karpaga Vinayagam played Bharati and Arjuna. The play was staged throughout India. It was also the first Tamil play to be telecast on Doordarshan. An audio version of the play was broadcast twice in Moscow.
