= Anand Kumar Tyagi =

Vice chancellor of Mahatma Gandhi Kashi Vidyapith

35th Vice-Chancellor of Mahatma Gandhi Kashi Vidyapith
- In office June 23, 2021 – June, 2027
- Appointed by: Governor of Uttar Pradesh, India
- Preceded by: Prof. (Dr.) Akhilesh Kumar Singh

Professor at Shaheed Bhagat Singh State University
- In office 2003–2021

Personal details
- Born: (India)
- Education: Indian Institute of Technology Kanpur
- Profession: Professor; Scientist; Researcher
- Known for: Rheometeric ITAS award 2000 for outstanding research
- Website: Official website

Anand Kumar Tyagi is an Indian Professor, education administrator, currently serving as the 35th Vice-Chancellor of Mahatma Gandhi Kashi Vidyapith. He has previously served as the Professor at Shaheed Bhagat Singh State University.

Tyagi was appointed as the 35th Vice-Chancellor of Mahatma Gandhi Kashi Vidyapith in June 2021.

== Awards, honors and fellowships ==
- Rheometeric ITAS award 2000 for outstanding research. (2000)
- Honorary membership of New York Academy of Sciences. (2015)
- Best Scientist Award National Council for Cements And Building materials, South Ext., New Delhi. (1988)
- Man of Achievement award 1998 by International Publishing House, New Delhi. (1998)

== Education ==
- Ph.D., IIT Kanpur.
- M. Tech., IIT Kanpur.

== Selected bibliography ==
=== Articles ===
- Tyagi, Anand K.; Shahi, K. (16 August 1992). "Electrical Resistivity and XRD Measurements on YBCO–PbS HTS System". Physica Status Solidi (a). 132 (2): 425–431. doi:10.1002/pssa.2211320218.
- Tyagi, Anand K.; Sharma, T. P.; Shahi, K. (16 December 1993). "The YBCO-PbS high-temperature superconducting system. Further investigations". Physica Status Solidi (a). 140 (2): 533–542. doi:10.1002/pssa.2211400224.
- Tyagi, Anand K.; Sharma, T.P. (February 1994). "Metallurgical reactions and enhanced magnetic field shielding in YBCO-PbS superconductors". Materials Letters. 18 (5–6): 341–348. doi:10.1016/0167-577X(94)90020-5.
- Tyagi, Anand K.; Sharma, T. P.; Shahi, K. (January 1994). "Study of 'YBCO-Ceramic Metal' Composite Superconducting System". Transactions of the Indian Ceramic Society. 53 (6): 135–139. doi:10.1080/0371750X.1994.10804659.
- Tyagi, Anand K.; Sharma, T. P.; Shahi, K. (April 1995). "Processability and metallurgical reactions during sintering in YBCO-PbS superconductors". Journal of Thermal Analysis. 44 (4): 755–764. doi:10.1007/BF02547262.
- Tyagi, Anand K.; Tyagi, Sanjeev; Sharma, T.P. (May 1995). "A high Tc superconducting magnetic shield for cryo-electronic devices". Materials Science and Engineering: B. 31 (3): 265–267. doi:10.1016/0921-5107(94)01157-5.
- Tyagi, Anand K.; Tyagi, Sanjeev; Sharma, T.P. (March 1997). "About the substitutions for CuO in YBCO high temperature superconductor". Materials Science and Engineering: B. 45 (1–3): 88–97. doi:10.1016/S0921-5107(96)01912-5.
