= Anant Maral Shastri =

Indian freedom activist (1912–1999)

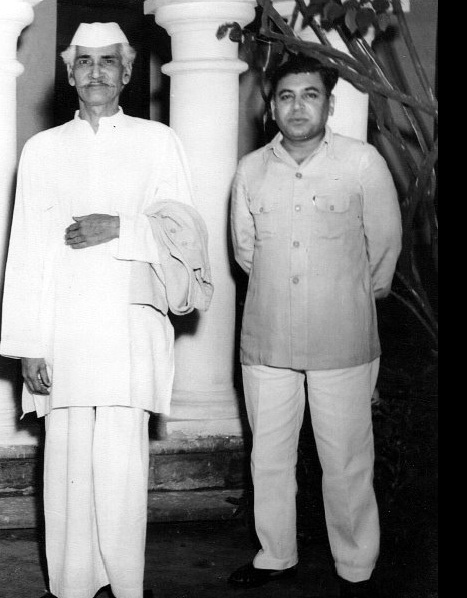
- Acharya Narenda Dev with Anant Maral Shastri in Indore
- Born: 1912; Ambikapur, Sarguja, Central Provinces and Berar, British India (now in Chhattisgarh, India)
- Died: 1999 (aged 86–87); India
- Education: Kashi Vidyapeeth, Varanasi
- Occupations: Freedom fighter; journalist; poet; scholar
- Known for: Role in India's independence movement, literary contributions, cultural administration
- Notable work: Ram Bhakti Shakha; Translation of Raghuvansh (for Jawaharlal Nehru)
- Political party: Indian National Congress
- Movement: Indian Independence Movement
- Spouse: Avantika Shastri

Anant Maral Shastri (1912–1999) was an Indian freedom fighter, journalist, literary figure, poet, Sanskrit scholar, linguist and administrator. At a very young age, he left Ambikapur, now in Chhattisgarh, and joined Kashi Vidyapeeth, a nationalist institution of learning in Varanasi, where he found a Guru in Acharya Narendra Dev, a great freedom fighter, scholar and teacher.

Anant Maral Shastri with Prime Minister Indira Gandhi

His father, Pandit Lal Bihari Sharma, was the official tutor of Raja Bahadur Raghunath Saran Singh Deo, Maharaja of Sarguja (1879–1917), who was the great grand father of Madaneswar Saran Singh Deo, who became Chief Secretary of Madhya Pradesh.

Pandit Lal Bihari Sharma had a huge landed property in Ambikapur, Sarguja, which his son Anant Maral, who was the only son and heir to that property, just left it when he joined Kashi Vidyapeeth and the Freedom Movement at a young age. He never returned to claim it after Independence.

== Front-ranking Freedom Fighters ==
At Kashi Vidyapeeth, Acharya Narendra Deva and Acharya JB Kriplani, both renowned freedom fighters, were Anant Maral's teachers. Lal Bahadur Shastri, who rose to become Prime Minister of India after the death of Pandit Jawaharlal Nehru, and Kamlapati Tripathi, who later became the chief minister of Uttar Pradesh, were his contemporaries at Kashi Vidyapeeth.

== Civil Disobedience Movement 1930–32 ==
There was a two-year period between 1930 and 1932 during the Civil Disobedience Movement, when the British had gagged the press. Anant Maral went underground to evade arrest and published the Congress Bulletin and Congress Samachar from Allahabad. He used to write in his own hand and cut stencils to print copies of the Congress bulletin. He used to go on foot from one village to another to distribute it and carry forward the Congress message. He also served as the Youth League secretary in Varanasi.

== Ram Bhakti Shakha ==
After acquiring the Shastri degree, Anant Maral went from Varanasi to Lahore where, after a short stint as a college professor, he became Editor of Hindi Milap—a prominent newspaper. By now he was extremely popular in literary circles of Lahore. His well-researched treatise on the Bhakti Movement was published as a book titled "Ram Bhakti Shakha" in Lahore (now in Pakistan) in 1945. It was prescribed as a text book for MA Hindi Literature by the Punjab University during the pre-Independence period. Renowned Hindi scholar, dramatist and former director All India radio, Udayshankar Bhatt wrote the preface of Ram Bhakti Shakha.

== Quit India Movement and Independence ==
Anant Maral was arrested and kept at the Patna Camp jail during the Quit India Movement in 1942. Sitaram Kesri, who later became the Indian National Congress President, was one of his cell mates in the Patna Jail. At the time of Independence, he shifted to Delhi from Lahore and joined the Publications Division in Government of India, as editor of Ajkal—the highest-circulated and the most popular Hindi magazine during those days. This magazine had become a platform for many budding poets and some of them emerged as India's greatest poets during the second half of last century.

== "Bhaiyon aur Behnon" (Brothers and Sisters) ==
At Publications Division, Anant Maral also played the key role in compiling and editing Mahatma Gandhi's Prayer Speeches that were recorded earlier by All India Radio. A collection of these speeches was published as "Bhaiyon aur Behnon" (Brothers and sisters).

== Saluting the Legends ==
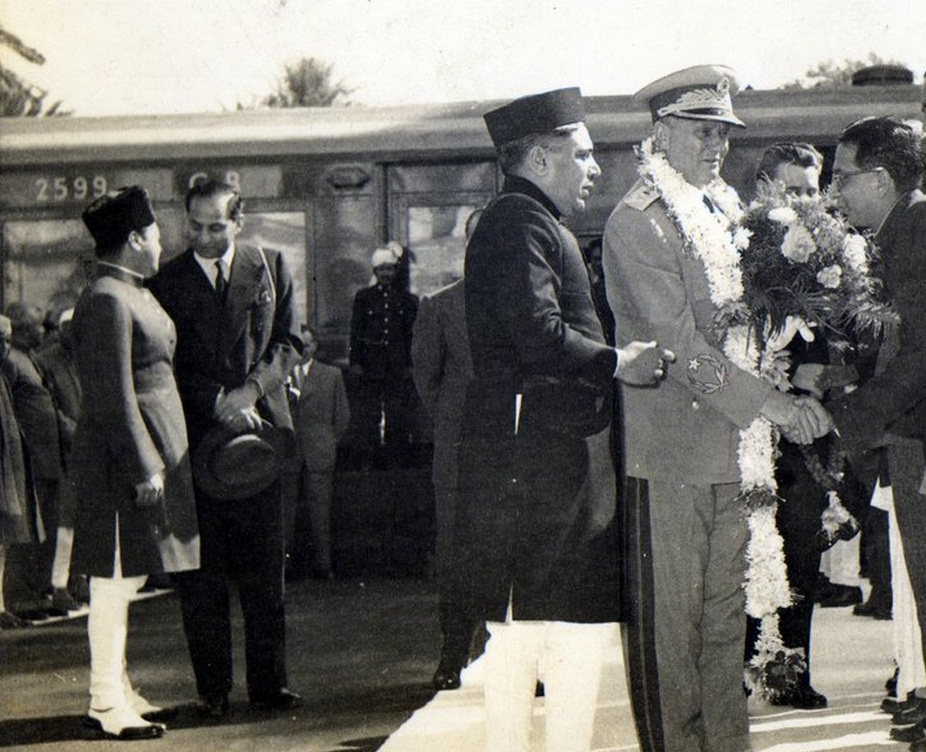
Photo shows Anant Maral Shastri with Marshal Tito. The former Maharaja of Gwalior Jiwajirao Scindia is on extreme left.

In 1949, Anant Maral Shastri came to Madhya Bharat as Director of Information and Publicity, a post which he also held in Madhya Pradesh after the reorganisation of States in 1956. He remained at the helm and managed the culture scene in this state for a long time (1956–71). During his tenure, two important annual events organised by the State—the famous Tansen Samaroh at Gwalior (music festival to commemorate the memory of Miyan Tansen—one of the nine gems in the court of the Moghul Emperor Akbar) and the Kalidas (festival) at Ujjain to salute Kalidas, the great Classical Sanskrit poet and dramatist had touched the pinnacle of glory. India's first President Dr. Rajendra Prasad had inaugurated the first Akhil Bharatiya Kalidas Samaroh (National Kalidas Festival) in 1958. Prime Minister of India, Pandit Jawaharlal Nehru was the chief guest at the second. On this occasion, Nehru was presented with Kalidasa's famous work, Raghuvansh. The epic was especially translated from Sanskrit to Hindi by Anant Maral Shastri for this occasion. It was at the initiative of BV Keskar, the Union Minister for Information and Broadcasting (1952–62) that Tansen Samaroh was turned into a national Music festival and has remained a popular platform for maestros to perform. For close to two decades, Anant Maral also spearheaded Madhya Pradesh Shasan Sahitya Parishad and Kala Parishad (State Councils for Literature and Arts). The Tagore Centenary and Alauddin Khan Centenary celebrations as well as the magnificent event organised during the 1960s at Khandwa to honour Makhanlal Chaturvedi, the legendary Hindi Poet, were a high water mark and shall always add to the pride and glory of Madhya Pradesh.
