= Aj (newspaper) =

Indian newspaper

Aj Hindi Daily
- Type: Daily newspaper
- Format: Broadsheet
- Editor-in-chief: Shardul Vikram Gupta
- Founded: 5 September 1920; 106 years ago
- Language: Hindi
- Headquarters: Varanasi

Aj (Hindi: आज, romanized: Āja, lit. 'Today') is a Hindi language daily broadsheet newspaper in India, currently published from 12 cities in the Bihar, Jharkhand, Uttar Pradesh and Uttarakhand states.

The main edition is published in Varanasi. The newspaper was founded by a freedom fighter named Shiv Prasad Gupta. During the days of Indian national freedom struggle, Aj not only served the cause, it also helped spread the popularity of Hindi literature among commoners in Hindi heartland and non-Hindi areas as well. It was once said if one wanted to learn Hindi, they had to "read Aj".

== Overview ==
This newspaper was founded by Shiv Prasad Gupta and its publication from Varanasi started on 5 September 1920. Sri Prakash was its first chief editor and Baburao Vishnu Paradkar, a noted journalist, its editor. After Sri Prakash stepped down, Paradkar became the chief editor from 1924 to 1954. Another noted journalist, Ramkrishna Raghunath Khadilkar, was the next chief editor from 1954 to 1959. Kamalapati Tripathi also served as its chief editor. Between 1975 and 1985, six new editions of Aj were commenced from Kanpur (1975), Patna (1979), Gorakhpur (1980), Allahabad, Agra and Ranchi (1984). In 1989, four new editions from Jamshedpur, Dhanbad, Lucknow and Bareilly were started. Presently, the editor-in-chief of the newspaper is Shardul Vikram Gupta. Bareilly edition's and Haldwani edition's General Manager is Sanjeev Krishna Tripathi. Haldwani edition was launched in 2013, with Dinesh Joshi, an eminent newspaper journalist, working as the newspapers head for the state of Uttarakhand. Lucknow edition's unit head is Harinder Singh Sahni.
