= Sushil Siddharth =

Hindi writer, critic, and satirist (1958–2018)

Sushil Siddharth (2 July 1958 – 17 March 2018) was a Hindi prose and poetry writer, critic, editor, and satirist. He was a journalist and columnist and the co-editor of several periodicals. He was awarded the Madhuban Vyanga Shri Samman in 2017 for his satirical works.

== Career ==
Born in the village of Bheera, Sitapur district of Uttar Pradesh, on 2 July 1958, Sushil Siddharth did his Ph.D. from the University of Lucknow.

After finishing his higher education, Siddharth became involved in the literary circles of Lucknow while continuing as a freelance writer for newspapers and magazines. He considered Gyan Chaturvedi the father of satire, and his personal mentor. He also co-edited the Hindi periodicals Tadbhav and Kathakrama. His column in the latter, titled Raag Lantrani, brought him recognition. During 1988–90, Siddharth and Ram Bahadur Mishra jointly edited and published Birwa, a quarterly magazine dedicated to promoting the Awadhi language. Siddharth was additionally a guest faculty at the Mahatma Gandhi International Hindi University, and also wrote plays for television and radio. Since its inception, he had been a regular contributor to Indraprastha Bharti, a magazine of the Hindi Academy in New Delhi, where his column Kataaksh was highly popular. He wrote four collections of satire: Preeti Na Kariyo Koy, Mo Sam Kaun, Naarad Ki Chinta, Maalish Mahapurana; and contributed two anthologies of poems: Eka and Bagan Bagan Kahe Chiriya in Awadhi.

The Uttar Pradesh Hindi Institute twice nominated Siddharth for its Best satire and Best Awadhi poem awards. In 2017, he was awarded the Madhuban Vyanga Shri Samman for his satirical works. Siddharth worked as an editor for the Rajkamal Prakashan group before joining Kitabghar Prakashan, where he served till his death. He edited the book series Vyanga Samay. For his work in literary criticism, Siddharth was awarded by Bhopal's Spandan Sanstha.

== Personal life ==
Siddharth stayed alone in Delhi while his family lived in Lucknow. He died on 17 March 2018 from complications arising after a heart attack. His body was cremated the following day in Lucknow's Bhainsakund Crematorium. A condolence ceremony in his memory was held at Gopal Chaturvedi's residence. Fellow writer Dayanand Pandey said that satire was the oxygen in Siddharth's life. (Note: Original statement in Hindi: "इनके जीवन में व्यंग्य ऑक्सीजन का काम करता था।") Novelist Maitreyi Pushpa was of the view that Siddharth's talent was never properly treasured in his lifetime, and that publishers for whom he worked took advantage of his financial condition. (Note: Original statements in Hindi: "सुशील की प्रतिभा का सही उपयोग नहीं हो सका।" and "सुशील सिद्धार्थ ने जिन भी प्रकाशनों में नौकरी की उन्होंने उनके आर्थिक अभाव को भुनाया।")
