= Mahatma Gandhi Kashi Vidyapith =

Public state university in Varanasi, Uttar Pradesh, India

- महात्मा गांधी काशी विद्यापीठ
- Official logo of MGKVP
- Former name: Kashi Vidyapith
- Motto: IAST: Vidyāmṛtam aśnute
- Motto in English: Knowledge imparts immortality
- Type: Public state university
- Established: 10 February 1921 (105 years ago)
- Accreditation: NAAC B++
- Affiliations: UGC, AIU
- Chancellor: Governor of Uttar Pradesh
- Vice-Chancellor: Anand Kumar Tyagi
- Campus: Urban, Maldahiya, Varanasi, Uttar Pradesh
- Website: www.mgkvp.ac.in

Mahatma Gandhi Kashi Vidyapith (MGKVP) is a public state university located in Varanasi, Uttar Pradesh, India. Established on 10 February 1921 as Kashi Vidyapith during the Non-cooperation movement, it was founded by nationalist leaders Shiv Prasad Gupta and Bhagwan Das and inaugurated by Mahatma Gandhi. The institution was established as part of the nationalist movement to promote education independent of British colonial administration. It became a statutory university under Uttar Pradesh legislation in 1974 and was subsequently brought under the state's university framework through legislation enacted in 2009.

The university offers undergraduate, postgraduate and doctoral programmes in several disciplines. It has a network of affiliated colleges in eastern Uttar Pradesh.

== History and Foundation ==
Kashi Vidyapith was established in Varanasi on 10 February 1921 by nationalist leaders Babu Shiv Prasad Gupta and Bhagwan Das during the Indian independence movement's Non-cooperation movement. It was founded as an Indian-run educational institution independent of British colonial administration. Mahatma Gandhi inaugurated the institution, which became associated with the movement for national education and self-reliance.

The university's history is closely connected with the nationalist movement. Among its early students was Lal Bahadur Shastri, who later became the second prime minister of India. He studied at Kashi Vidyapith and received the degree of Shastri, which became part of his name.

The institution was renamed Mahatma Gandhi Kashi Vidyapith in 1995 in honour of Gandhi.

=== Golden Jubilee and commemorative stamp ===
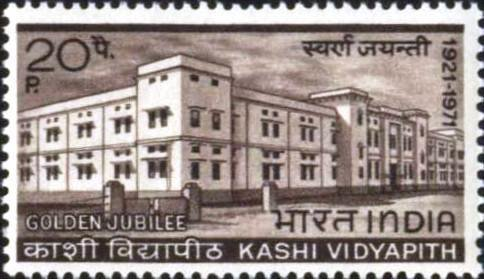

In 1971, the Government of India issued a commemorative postage stamp to mark the 50th anniversary of Kashi Vidyapith. The stamp was issued on 10 February 1971, the anniversary of the institution's founding.

== Campus and Organizations ==
The university's main campus is located in Maldahiya, Varanasi, Uttar Pradesh. The institution maintains academic and administrative facilities to support its teaching programmes and affiliated colleges.

The university's affiliated-college network serves students in eastern Uttar Pradesh. The official university website provides information about affiliated colleges and academic programmes.

== Accreditation and Affiliations ==
Mahatma Gandhi Kashi Vidyapith is a state university in Uttar Pradesh and is associated with the University Grants Commission (UGC) and the Association of Indian Universities (AIU).

The university has been reported as holding a B++ grade from the National Assessment and Accreditation Council (NAAC).

== Departments and Faculties ==
The university offers academic programmes through faculties covering a range of disciplines. These include:

- Faculty of Arts and Humanities
- Faculty of Social Science and Social Work
- Faculty of Science and Technology
- Faculty of Commerce and Management
- Faculty of Law
- Faculty of Education
- Faculty of Agriculture Science

The university offers undergraduate, postgraduate, diploma and doctoral programmes in various subject areas. Details of courses and departments are published through the university's official academic information channels.

== Notable alumni ==
Mahatma Gandhi Kashi Vidyapith has been associated with political leaders, participants in the Indian independence movement, scholars, writers and sportspersons. The following people have been identified in published sources as alumni or former students of the institution.

=== Statesmen and political leaders ===
- Lal Bahadur Shastri – second prime minister of India; studied at Kashi Vidyapith and received the degree of Shastri.
- Ramakrishna Hegde – former chief minister of Karnataka and Union minister.
- Kamlapati Tripathi – former chief minister of Uttar Pradesh and Union railway minister; received academic qualifications from Kashi Vidyapith.
- Bhola Paswan Shastri – former chief minister of Bihar; earned his Shastri degree from Kashi Vidyapith.
- Tribhuvan Narain Singh – former chief minister of Uttar Pradesh; studied at Kashi Vidyapith.
- Ram Naresh Yadav – former chief minister of Uttar Pradesh and governor of Madhya Pradesh.
- Kalraj Mishra – former governor of Rajasthan and Union cabinet minister.
- B. V. Keskar – former Union minister for information and broadcasting.
- G. Sanjeeva Reddy – trade union leader and president of the Indian National Trade Union Congress (INTUC).
- Rajaram – former national vice-president of the Bahujan Samaj Party (BSP).

=== Freedom fighters and revolutionaries ===
- Chandra Shekhar Azad – Indian revolutionary and freedom fighter.
- Manmath Nath Gupta – revolutionary, writer and participant in the Kakori conspiracy.
- Pranavesh Chatterjee – revolutionary associated with the Hindustan Republican Association (HRA).
- Anant Maral Shastri – freedom fighter, author and scholar.
- Harinath Shastri – freedom fighter and trade union leader.

=== Scholars, authors and public figures ===
- Naheed Abidi – Sanskrit scholar and writer; received a doctorate from Mahatma Gandhi Kashi Vidyapith and was awarded the Padma Shri.
- Nivaan Sen – Indian television actor and producer.
- Gopi Kumar Sonkar – Indian field hockey player selected for the Indian team for the 2018 Sultan of Johor Cup.

== See also ==
- List of educational institutions in Varanasi
- List of state universities in Uttar Pradesh
