= Gopal Chaturvedi =

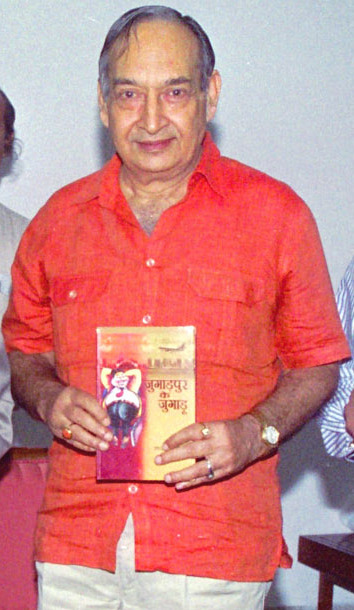
- Gopal Chaturvedi
- Born: 15 August 1942; Lucknow
- Died: 24 July 2025 (aged 84); Lucknow, Uttar Pradesh, India
- Education: Hamidia College, Bhopal; Scindia College; University of Allahabad (M.A.)
- Occupations: Satirist, poet, civil servant
- Writing career
- Language: Hindi
- Genres: Satire, poetry
- Notable works: Afsar Ki Maut, Dum Ki Wapsi, Ganga Se Gatar Tak, Aadmi Aur Gidd
- Notable awards: Yash Bharti Award, Subramanyam Bharti Award, Sahitya Bhushan, Premchand Award

Gopal Chaturvedi (1942–2025) was an Indian satirist, author, poet, and former Indian Railway Accounts Service officer. He wrote in Hindi and was primarily known for his satirical works, which frequently addressed social, political, and bureaucratic topics. He authored over a dozen satirical collections, including Afsar Ki Maut, Dum Ki Wapsi, and Ram Jharokhe Baith Ke. He was honoured with the Yash Bharti, the highest civilian honour of the Government of Uttar Pradesh, and the Subramanyam Bharti Award by the Central Institute of Hindi for his contribution to literature.

== Early life and education ==
Gopal Chaturvedi was born on 15 August 1942 in Lucknow, Uttar Pradesh. He later settled in Dewas, Madhya Pradesh. He completed his intermediate education at Scindia College and graduated from Hamidia College, Bhopal. He did a Master's degree in English Literature from University of Allahabad.

== Career ==
=== Government service ===
After completing his studies, he was selected for the Indian Railway Service and served from 1965 to 1993 in various senior financial and administrative capacities in the Indian Railways, the National Security Guard, Central Reserve Police Force, the State Trading Corporation (STC) of India, and other government ministries.

=== Literary career ===
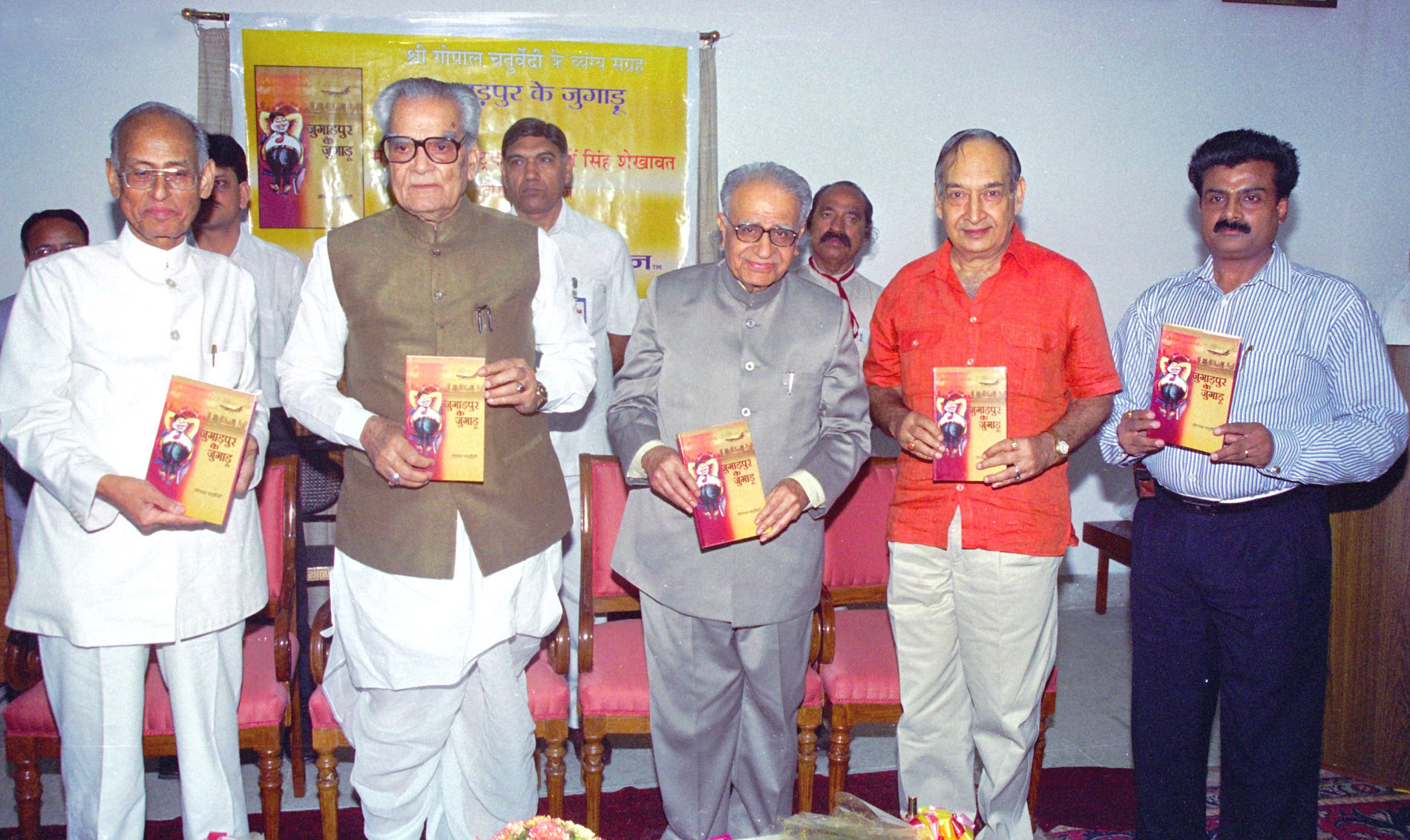
The Vice President of India, Bhairon Singh Shekhawat releasing Chaturvedi's book, Jugarpur ke Jugaru in 2005

Gopal Chaturvedi worked across both prose and poetry, although his primary recognition came from his contribution to Hindi satire. His writing frequently drew upon everyday social and institutional contexts, presenting them through a measured use of humour and observation.

His poetry collections, Kuchh To Ho and Dhoop Ki Talash, were noted following their publication. His satirical writings include Dhaandhleshwar, Afsar Ki Maut, Dum Ki Wapsi, Ram Jharokhe Baith Ke, File Padhi, Aadmi Aur Gidd, Kursipur Ka Kabir, Farm House Ke Log, and Sattapur Ke Nakate, which circulated widely among readers of Hindi literature. Within Hindi literary circles, Chaturvedi was regarded as an established satirist, with a body of work spanning both verse and prose.

In 2019, he brought out two further books, Pathar Phenko Sukhi Raho and Gaur Talab, taking his total published works to 24. The book Gaur Talab is held in the collections of the New York Public Library.

A special issue dedicated to his work was published by Vyangya Yatra, later brought out in book form, and in 2021 he was awarded the Ravindranath Tyagi Smriti Shikhar Samman by the same magazine for his work in Hindi satire.

Chaturvedi also contributed columns to India Today for five years, to Sarika for three years, and to Dharamyug and other periodicals.

== Bibliography ==
=== Poetry collections ===
- Kuchh To Ho
- Dhoop Ki Talash

=== Selected satire collections ===
- Afsar Ki Maut
- Dum Ki Wapsi
- Ganga Se Gatar Tak
- Ram Jharokhe Baith Ke
- File Padhi Padhi
- Dhaandhleshwar
- Aadmi Aur Gidd
- Kursipur Ka Kabir
- Farm House Ke Log
- Sattapur Ke Nakate
- Khambhon Ka Khel
- Azad Bharat Mein Kalu
- Daant Mein Phansi Kursi
- Naitikta Ki Langdi Daud
- Bharat Aur Bhains
- Jugaadpur Ke Jugaadu
- Ikyaavan Shreshtha Vyangya Rachnayein
- Khari-Khoti
- Doodh Mein Dhula Loktantra

== Personal life ==
Gopal Chaturvedi died on July 24, 2025, at the age of 84 in Lucknow, Uttar Pradesh.

Chaturvedi's son, Sandeep, worked in documentary filmmaking and died in 2015. His daughter, Swati, is a freelance journalist. The book Gaur Talab is held in the collections of the New York Public Library. His wife, Nisha, retired principal collector in customs and central excise, died on 18 July 2025, six days before Gopal Chaturvedi's death.

== Awards and recognition ==
He was included in Who's Who of Indian Writers, 1999, published by the Sahitya Akademi. He received the Premchand Award from the Railway Board (1986), the Akhil Bharatiya Bhasha Sammelan Award (1991–92), the Sahityakar Samman from the Hindi Academy, Delhi (1995–96), and the Sahitya Bhushan from the Uttar Pradesh Hindi Sansthan (2001).

Chaturvedi received the fifth Vyangyashree Samman from Shri Purushottam Hindi Bhawan Nyas Samiti at Hindi Bhavan, New Delhi, where the award was presented by Vasant Sathe in a ceremony chaired by Namvar Singh, in 2001.

In 2015, he was awarded the Yash Bharati, the highest civilian honour of the state, by the Government of Uttar Pradesh. He was also a recipient of the Subramanyam Bharti Award conferred by the Central Institute of Hindi.

His satirical writings were the subject of a doctoral thesis titled "Gopal Chaturvedi ke Vyangya-Lekhan ka Alochanatmak Adhyayan" (A Critical Study of the Satirical Writings of Gopal Chaturvedi) at the Central University of Haryana in 2016. He was awarded the Bimb Shikhar Samman by Bimb Kala Kendra in 2017 on the occasion of its 37th foundation day in Lucknow.

In September 2017, he was awarded the Sharad Joshi Samman by the Department of Culture, Government of Madhya Pradesh, for his contribution to Hindi prose, particularly in the fields of essays, reportage, and diary writing.
