= Civil disobedience (disambiguation) =

Civil disobedience is the active refusal to obey certain laws, demands and commands of a government or of an occupying power, usually without resorting to physical violence.

Civil disobedience may also refer to:

- "Civil Disobedience" (essay), an essay by Henry David Thoreau, published in 1849
- Civil disobedience movement, Salt Satyagraha, led by Mahatma Gandhi in 1930 during the Indian independence movement
- Civil disobedience movement in Kashmir or the 2010 Kashmir unrest, civil unrest in Jammu and Kashmir, India
- Civil Disobedience (album), a 2008 album by electro-industrial musical project Leæther Strip
- "Civil Disobedience," a song by Camper Van Beethoven from their album New Roman Times
- "Civil Disobedience," a song by Throwing Muses from their 2003 album Throwing Muses

== See also ==
- Non-cooperation movement (disambiguation)
