= Swami Satyamitranand =

Indian spiritual guru of Advaita Philosophy School of Hinduism

Swami Satyamitranand (19 September 1932 – 25 June 2019), usually known as Swami Satmitranand Giri was a Hindu spiritual guru. He was born on 19 September 1932 in the city of Agra, Uttar Pradesh, India, as Ambika Prasad. He was crowned the Jagatguru Shankaracharya of an Upapeeth of Jyotir Math. He was the founder of Bharat Mata Mandir, a temple in Haridwar. He founded Samanvaya Seva Foundation in 1988.

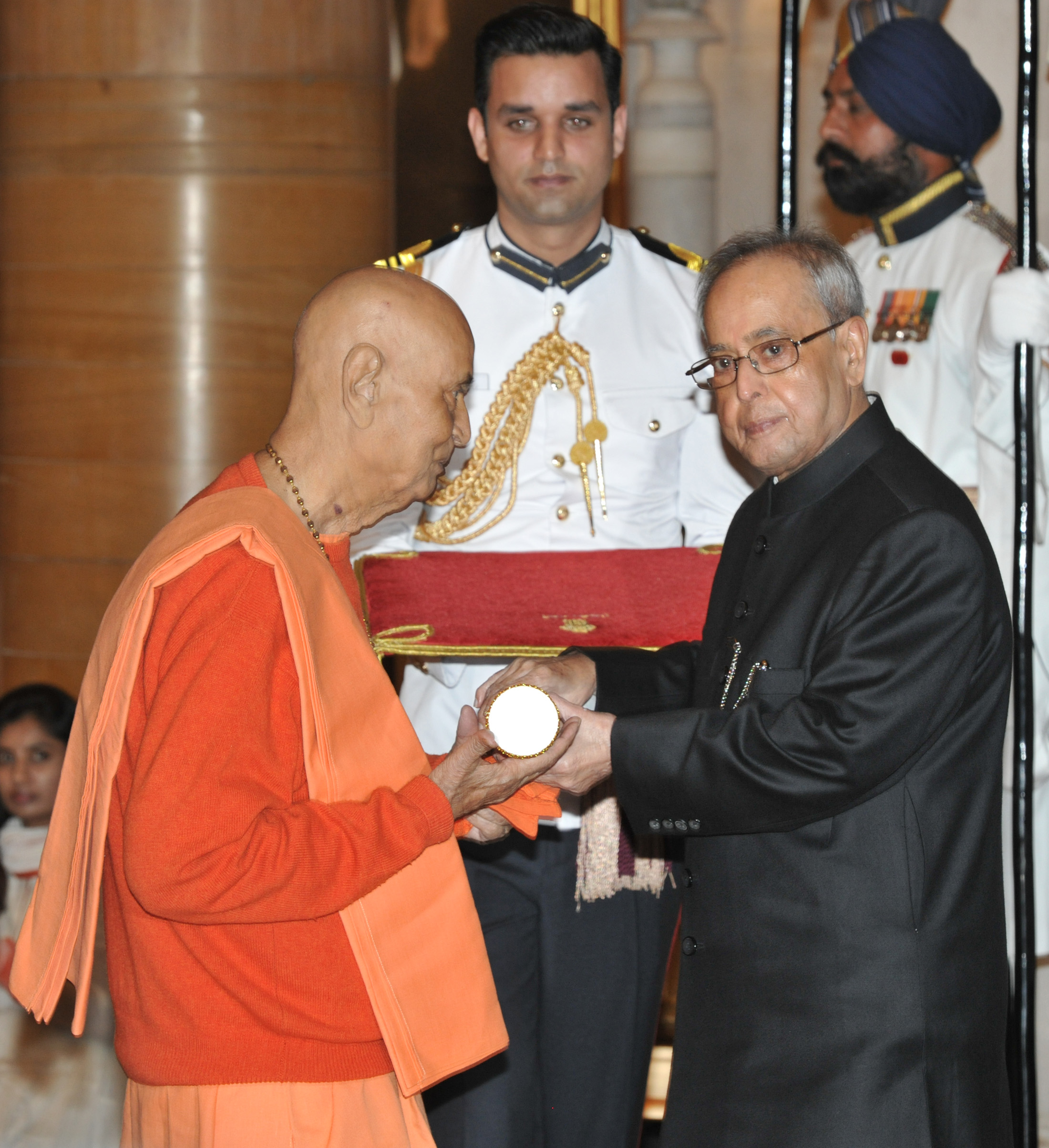
The President, Shri Pranab Mukherjee presenting the Padma Bhushan Award to Swami Satyamitranand Giri, at a Civil Investiture Ceremony, at Rashtrapati Bhavan, in New Delhi on 8 April 2015

In June 1969, Swamiji abdicated his status of Jagatguru Shankaracharya. He was awarded the Padma Bhushan by Government of India in the year 2015.
