= Shaheed Bhagat Singh State University =

State University in Ferozepur, Punjab

Shaheed Bhagat Singh State University, Ferozepur
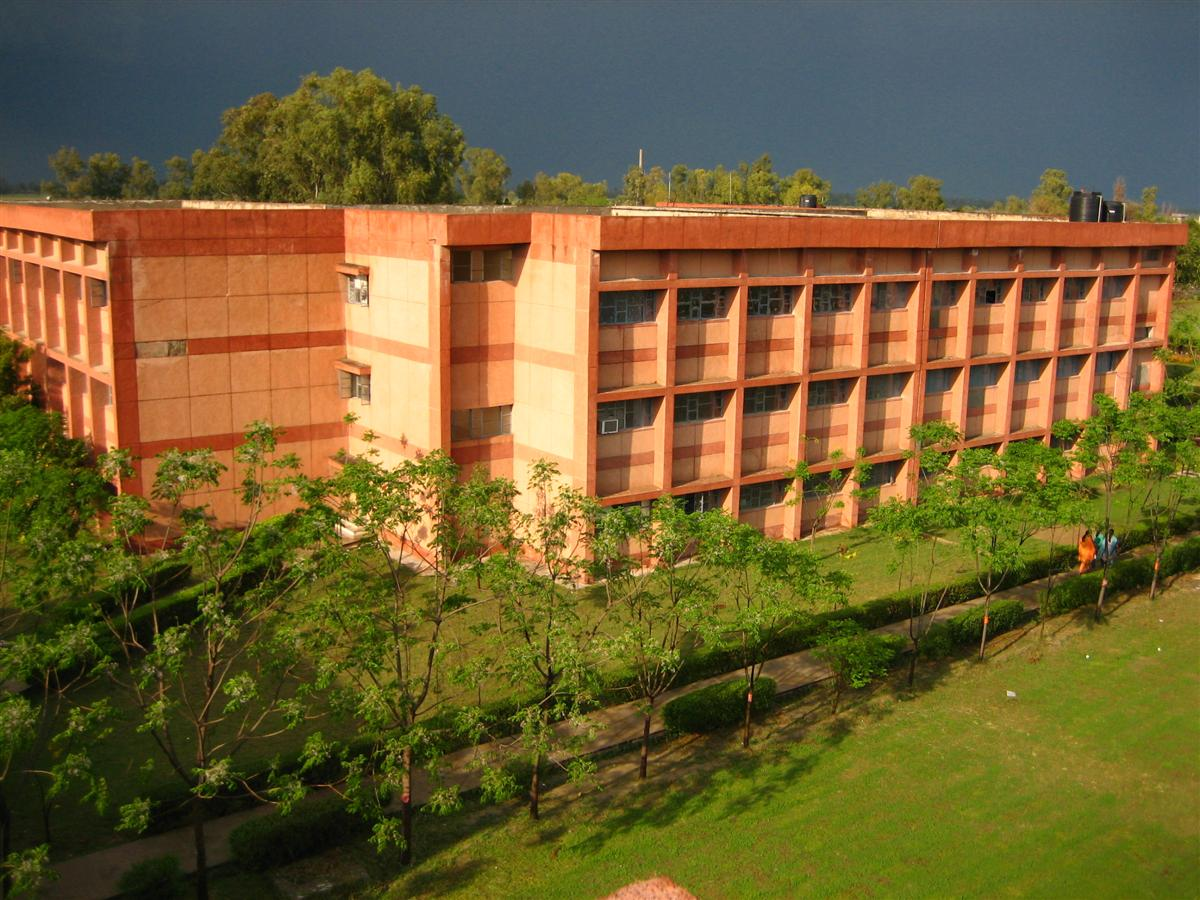
- Type: State University (Government)
- Established: 1995; 31 years ago
- Chancellor: Governor of Punjab
- Vice-Chancellor: Dr. Suresh Kumar Sharma
- Location: Ferozepur, Punjab, India; 30.91°N 74.65°E
- Campus: 98 acres (40 ha)
- Colors: Saffron and Navy Blue
- Website: www.sbssu.ac.in

Shaheed Bhagat Singh State University (SBS State University), previously known as Shaheed Bhagat Singh State Technical Campus and Shaheed Bhagat Singh College of Engineering and Technology, is a state university located in Ferozepur, Punjab.

== Affiliation ==
Shaheed Bhagat Singh State University (SBSSU) is approved by the All India Council for Technical Education (AICTE) and enjoys academic autonomy under the University Grants Commission (UGC) Act. Prior to attaining university status in 2021, the institute was affiliated with I. K. Gujral Punjab Technical University (IKGPTU), Jalandhar.

The university follows a semester-based academic system, with the academic year divided into two semesters: July/August to December (Odd Semester) and January to June/July (Even Semester). End-semester examinations are conducted at the conclusion of each term, and continuous assessment is carried out throughout the semester in accordance with the university’s academic regulations.

SBSSU is also governed by norms and standards laid down by national regulatory bodies such as the UGC, AICTE, and the Department of Technical Education and Industrial Training, Punjab.

== Academic departments and faculty ==
Shaheed Bhagat Singh State University (SBSSU), Ferozepur comprises academic departments in engineering, applied sciences, computer applications, agricultural sciences and polytechnic education. The university offers diploma, undergraduate, postgraduate and doctoral programmes in multiple disciplines.

=== Engineering and academic departments ===
==== Department of Civil Engineering ====
The Department of Civil Engineering offers undergraduate and postgraduate programmes in structural engineering, transportation engineering, environmental engineering, geotechnical engineering and construction technology. The department maintains specialised laboratories in surveying, fluid mechanics, transportation engineering, geotechnical engineering, structural analysis and concrete technology.

Faculty member	Designation	Qualifications	Specialisation
Dr. Dapinder Deep Singh	Head of Department	Ph.D., M.E. Environmental Engineering, B.Tech.	Environmental Engineering
Dr. Bohar Singh	Associate Professor	Ph.D., M.Tech. Geotechnical Engineering	Geotechnical Engineering
Dr. Parampreet Kaur	Assistant Professor	Ph.D., M.Tech.	Soil Mechanics and Foundation Engineering
Dr. Gurpreet Singh	Assistant Professor	M.E. Highway Engineering	Highway Engineering
Er. Siddhant Chopra	Assistant Professor	M.Tech., B.Tech.	Structural Engineering
Gurtej Singh Sidhu	Assistant Professor	M.Tech.	Construction Engineering

==== Department of Computer Science and Engineering ====
The Department of Computer Science and Engineering was established in 1996 and offers B.Tech., B.Tech. (Data Science), M.Tech., Ph.D. and postgraduate diploma programmes in Cyber Security. Research areas include artificial intelligence, machine learning, cloud computing, data science, software engineering and network security.

Faculty member	Designation	Qualifications	Research interests / specialization
Dr. Sunny Behal	Associate Professor & Head of Department	Ph.D., M.Tech. (CSE), B.Tech.	Artificial Intelligence and Machine Learning
Dr. Daljeet Kaur	Associate Professor	Ph.D., M.Tech. (CSE)	Computer Science Engineering
Japinder Singh	Associate Professor	M.S., B.Tech.	Software Systems
Dr. Sonika Jindal	Associate Professor	Ph.D., M.Tech.	Data Analytics and Computing
Dr. Navtej Singh Ghumman	Associate Professor	Ph.D., M.E.	Cloud Computing and Networks
Dr. Vishal Arora	Assistant Professor	Ph.D., M.Tech.	Computer Engineering
Pawan Luthra	Assistant Professor	M.Tech. (CSE)	Software Development
Gagandeep Luthra	Assistant Professor	M.Tech.	Computer Networks
Ms. Parveen Kaur	Assistant Professor	M.Tech.	Software Engineering
Ms. Pallavi Bansal	Assistant Professor	M.Tech. (Computer Networks)	Computer Networks
Ms. Dolly	Assistant Professor	M.Tech. (CSE)	Data Science
Ms. Gurpreet Kaur	Assistant Professor	M.Tech. (CSE)	Computer Science
Avtar Singh Kainth	Lab Superintendent	MCA	Laboratory Administration
Davinder Monga	Computer Operator	MCA	Computer Operations
Naveen Chand	Technical Grade-II	M.Lib. & Information Science	Information Systems
Paramjit Singh	Junior Technician	Matriculation	Technical Support
Balwinder Singh	Technician Grade-I	Diploma in Mechanical Engineering	Technical Maintenance
Twinkle Mehto	Junior Technician	B.Tech. (CSE)	Technical Assistance

==== Department of Electronics and Communication Engineering ====
The Department of Electronics and Communication Engineering conducts teaching and research in embedded systems, VLSI, signal processing, wireless communication and communication technologies.

Faculty member	Designation	Qualifications	Specialisation
Dr. Vishal Sharma	Head of Department	Ph.D., M.Tech.	Communication Systems
Dr. Sanjeev Dewra	Professor	Ph.D., M.Tech., B.E.	Embedded Systems
Dr. Rajni	Associate Professor	Ph.D.	Signal Processing
Dr. Jaswinder Kaur	Assistant Professor	Ph.D.	Wireless Communication
Mr. Inderjeet Singh Gill	Assistant Professor	M.Tech.	Electronics Engineering
Dr. Vikram Mutneja	Assistant Professor	Ph.D., M.Tech.	VLSI Systems

==== Department of Mechanical Engineering ====
The Department of Mechanical Engineering offers programmes and research in manufacturing engineering, production engineering, CAD/CAM, thermal engineering and industrial engineering.

Faculty member	Designation	Qualifications	Research area
Dr. Manjinder Singh	Head of Department	Ph.D., M.Tech.	Manufacturing Engineering
Dr. T. S. Sidhu	Professor	Ph.D.	Thermal Engineering
Dr. Neelkanth Grover	Professor	Ph.D.	Production Engineering
Dr. Rakesh Sharma	Professor	Ph.D.	CAD/CAM
Dr. Arun Asati	Professor	Ph.D.	Industrial Engineering
Dr. Tejeet Singh	Professor	Ph.D.	Mechanical Systems
Dr. Manoj Kushwaha	Assistant Professor	Ph.D.	Mechanical Design
Mr. Jatinder Aggarwal	Assistant Professor	M.Tech.	Production Engineering
Mr. Munish Kumar	Assistant Professor	M.Tech.	Manufacturing Technology

==== Department of Chemical Engineering ====
Faculty member	Designation	Qualifications	Area of specialisation
Dr. Rajiv Arora	Head of Department	Ph.D., M.Tech.	Chemical Process Engineering
Dr. Rajiv Garg	Professor	Ph.D.	Industrial Chemistry
Mrs. Balpreet Kaur	Assistant Professor	M.Tech.	Chemical Engineering
Mr. Amit Arora	Assistant Professor	M.Tech.	Process Engineering
Mr. Surinder Singh	Assistant Professor	M.Tech.	Industrial Processes

==== Department of Computer Applications ====
Faculty member	Designation	Qualifications	Area of expertise
Mr. Anil Bansal	Associate Professor	MCA, M.Tech.	Information Technology
Dr. Gulshan Ahuja	Associate Professor & Head	Ph.D., MCA	Data Systems
Ms. Bindu Bala	Associate Professor	MCA, M.Tech.	Information Technology
Ms. Nisha Gupta	Associate Professor	MCA, MS (BITS Pilani)	Software Engineering
Mr. Amardeep Chopra	Assistant Professor	MCA	Computer Applications

==== Department of Applied Sciences and Humanities ====
Faculty member	Designation	Qualifications	Discipline
Dr. Kiranjit Kaur	Head of Department & Professor	Ph.D.	Applied Sciences
Dr. Lalit Sharma	Professor Emeritus	Ph.D.	Applied Physics
Dr. Kul Bhushan Agnihotri	Professor	Ph.D.	Applied Chemistry
Dr. Rakesh Kumar	Assistant Professor	Ph.D.	Mathematics

==== Department of Agriculture Sciences ====
Faculty member	Designation	Qualifications	Area of expertise
Dr. Rajiv Arora	Head of Department	Ph.D.	Agricultural Sciences
Mr. Ranjit Singh	Assistant Professor	M.Sc.	Crop Science
Ms. Amandeep Kaur	Assistant Professor	M.Sc.	Agricultural Research
Ms. Navneet Kaur	Assistant Professor	M.Sc.	Soil Science
Mr. Arshveer Singh	Assistant Professor	M.Sc.	Agronomy
Mr. Jagjeet Singh	Assistant Professor	M.Sc.	Crop Production
Ms. Lovedeep Kaur	Assistant Professor	M.Sc.	Agricultural Extension

=== Polytechnic wing ===
Faculty member	Department	Designation	Qualifications
Dr. Sanjeev Dewra	Polytechnic Wing	Principal	Ph.D., M.Tech., B.E.
Dr. Kamal Khanna	Mechanical Engineering	Lecturer	Ph.D., M.Tech., B.Tech.
Mr. Gobind	Mechanical Engineering	Lecturer	Ph.D. pursuing, MBA, M.Tech.
Mr. Retaish Uppal	Mechanical Engineering	Lecturer	Ph.D. pursuing, M.Tech.
Mr. Rahul Chopra	Mechanical Engineering	Lecturer	M.Tech., B.Tech.
Mr. Rahul Sharma	Electrical Engineering	Lecturer	M.Tech., B.Tech.
Mr. Rajesh Kumar	Electrical Engineering	Lecturer	M.Tech., B.Tech.
Mr. Gurjeevan Singh	Electronics and Communication Engineering	Lecturer	Ph.D. pursuing, M.Tech.
Mr. Ajay Kumar	Electronics and Communication Engineering	Lecturer	Ph.D. pursuing, M.Tech.
Mr. Manpreet Singh	Electronics and Communication Engineering	Lecturer	Ph.D. pursuing, M.Tech.
Ms. Richa Sawhney	Computer Science and Engineering	Lecturer	Ph.D. pursuing, M.Tech.
Mr. Chetan Batra	Computer Science and Engineering	Lecturer	M.Tech., B.Tech.
Ms. Anuradha Rani	Computer Science and Engineering	Lecturer	Ph.D. pursuing, M.Tech.
Mr. Rajnish Kumar	Mathematics	Lecturer	M.Sc. Mathematics, UGC-NET

== Courses Offered ==
=== B.Tech ===
All the courses of Engineering are of four years duration (eight semesters).

Branch	Intake
Chemical Engineering	30
Computer Science & Engineering	120
Civil Engineering	60
Electronics & Communication Engineering	90
Electrical Engineering	60
Mechanical Engineering	120

- 5% additional seats for admission in 1st year for Fee-Waiver Scheme and
- 20% additional seats for direct admission to 2nd year for diploma holder students through lateral entry scheme.

=== Diploma ===
All the courses of Diploma are of three years duration (six semesters).

Branch	Intake
Computer Science and Engineering	60
Electronics & Communication Engineering	60
Electrical Engineering	60
Mechanical Engineering	60

=== M. Tech (Regular) ===
All the courses of M. Tech (Regular) are of two years duration (four semesters).

Branch	Intake
Computer Science & Engineering	18
Electronics & Communication Engineering	18

=== Management ===
Branch	Intake
Master of Business Administration (MBA)	60
Bachelor of Science (Information Technology)	60

=== Computer Applications ===
All these courses are of three years duration (six semesters).

Branch	Intake
Master of Computer Applications	60
Bachelor of Computer Applications	60

=== PTU Regional Center for Part-Time M.Tech ===
All the courses of M. Tech (Part-Time) are of three years duration (six semesters).

Branch	Intake
Chemical Engineering	25
Computer Science & Engineering	25
Electronics & Communication Engineering	25
Environment Science & Engineering	25
Mechanical Engineering	25

== Vice Chancellor issue ==
Since 2021 to 2026, the University had no Regular Vice-chancellor.

In January 2026, Dr Suresh Kumar Sharma was appointed as the Vice-chancellor since its inception in April 2021.
