= Non-cooperation movement =

Non-cooperation movement may refer to:

- Non-cooperation movement (1919–1922), during the Indian independence movement, led by Mahatma Gandhi against British rule
- Non-cooperation movement (1971), a movement in East Pakistan
- Non-cooperation movement (2024), a movement in Bangladesh against Awami League government

== See also ==
- Civil disobedience (disambiguation)
  - Civil disobedience movement or the Salt March, protest movement led by Mahatma Gandhi in 1930
