= Subramanyam Bharti Award =

Subramanyam Bharti Award सुब्रह्मण्यम भारती पुरस्कार
- Award for contributions to Hindi Literature
- Awarded for: Literary award in India
- Sponsored by: Kendriya Hindi Sansthan, Government of India
- First award: 1989
- Final award: 2007

Highlights
- Total awarded: 46
- First winner: Dr. Prabhakar Machwe; Dr. Wrajeshhwar Verma; Dr. Hardev Bahari; Dr. N.A Nagappa; Pro. Ram Singh Tomar; Dr. Bhakt Darshan; Dr. P Gopal Sharma; Sri Mangalnath Singh
- Last winner: Pro. Nirmala Jain; Pro. Nandkishore Nawal
- Website: khsindia.org/india/en/awards/award-categories/subramanyam-bharti-award.html

Subramanyam Bharti Award (Devanagari: सुब्रह्मण्यम भारती पुरस्कार) is a literary honour in India which Kendriya Hindi Sansthan, (Central Hindi Organization), Ministry of Human Resource Development, annually confers on writers of outstanding works in Hindi literature. It is also a Hindi Sevi Samman and is given to number of Hindi experts for playing their important role in promoting the Hindi language.

== History ==
The award was established by Kendriya Hindi Sansthan in 1989 on the name of the great Tamil writer Subramania Bharati. It was first awarded in the year 1989 to Dr. Prabhakar Machwe, Dr. Wrajeshhwar Verma, Dr. Hardev Bahri, Dr. N.A. Nagappa, Prof. Ram Singh Tomar, Dr. Bhakt Darshan, Dr. P. Gopal Sharma and Sri Mangalnath Singh.

== Honour ==
Subramanyam Bharti Award is awarded for the significant services in development of creative/critical areas in Hindi every year by the President of India.

== Award recipients ==
Year	Name	Presenter
1989	Dr. Prabhakar Machwe; Dr. Wrajeshhwar Verma; Dr. Hardev Bahri; Dr. N.A Nagappa; Pro. Ram Singh Tomar; Dr. Bhakt Darshan; Dr. P Gopal Sharma; Sri Mangalnath Singh	
1990	Acharya Devendra Nath Sharma; Dr. Ramanath Sahay	
1991	Dr. Shivmangal Singh 'Suman'; Smt. Shivani; Dr. N. V. Rajagapolan	
1992	Sri Vinay Mohan Sharma; Baba Nagarjuna	
1993	Sri Nazir Banarasi; Sri Rameshwar Shukla 'Achal'	
1994	Dr. Kailash Chandra Bhatia; Dr. Amba Shankar Nagar	
1995	Pro. Kalyanmal Lodha; Sri Hanumchchhastri Ayachit	
1996	Sri Nageshwar Sundaram; Pro. G Sundar Reddy	
1997	Dr. Nazir Muhammad; Dr. Laxminarayan Dubey	
1998	Dr. Ram Vilas Sharma; Late Dr. Vijayendra Snatak	
1999	Sri Arvind Kumar; Dr. Maheep Singh	
2000	Smt. Tara Pandey; Dr. Kumar Vimal	
2001	Sri Govind Mishra; Sri Krishna Ballabh Dwivedi; Dr. Kanahaiya Singh	
2002	Sri Manu Sharma; Sri Dharampal Maini	
2003	Sri Manager Pandey; Sri Vishnuchandra Sharma	
2004	Sri Vijendra Narayan Singh; Sri Hrituraj	
2005	Sri Manzoor Ahtesham; Sri Krishnadutt Paliwal	
2006	Pro. Kamla Prasad; Sri Surajpal Chauhan	
2007	Pro. Nirmala Jain; Pro. Nandkishore Nawal	
