= Indian Science Writers' Association =

The Indian Science Writers' Association (ISWA) was established on April-14, 1985 to develop and nurture the science writing and science communication professions in India. It has more than three hundred members and nine chapters in various Indian states.
