= Shiv Prasad Gupta =

Indian independence activist (1883–1944)

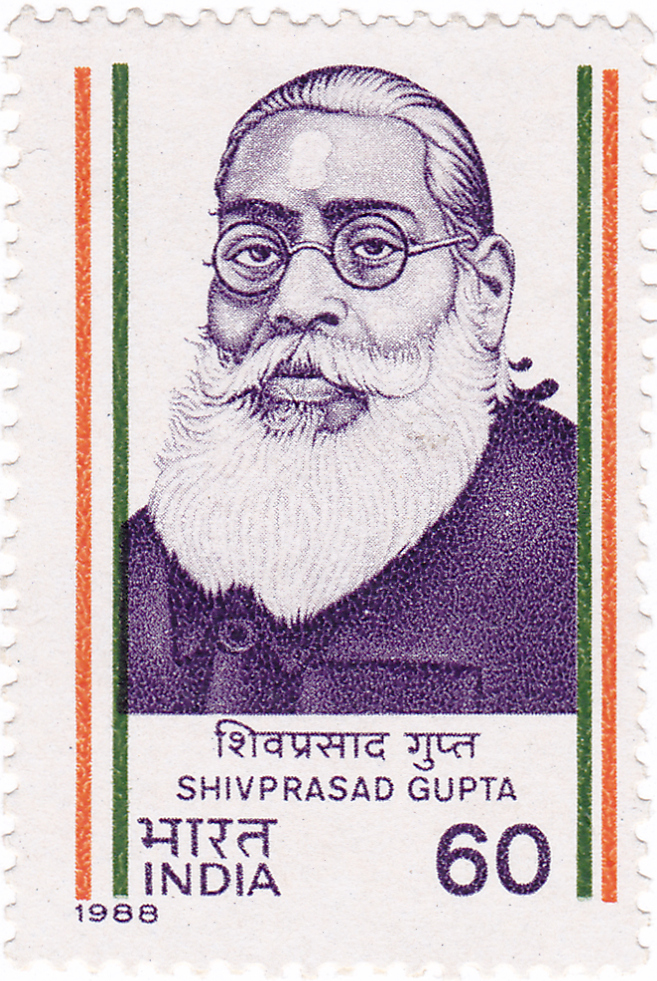
Shiv Prasad Gupta on a 1988 stamp of India

Shiv Prasad Gupta (28 June 1883 – 24 April 1944) was a visionary, philanthropist, a leader of the Indian Freedom Movement and the founder of the Mahatma Gandhi Kashi Vidyapeeth. Though belonging to a very wealthy industrialist and "Jamindar" family, he devoted his entire life to actively participate, assist and give financial aid to the various movements of the freedom struggle. He was a close associate and friend of Mahatma Gandhi, Pandit Jawaharlal Nehru, Bal Gangadhar Tilak, Mahamana Madan Mohan Malviya and all the other nationalist leaders, who often stayed with him on their visit to Varanasi and relied upon his advice and support.

In Varanasi he established the Kashi Vidyapeeth – a state university; the "Bharat Mata Mandir" – a National Heritage monument; "Shiv Prasad Gupta Hospital" – the civil Hospital of Varanasi; the daily Hindi newspaper Aaj – the oldest existing Hindi newspaper, and numerous other projects and activities. At Akbarpur, he gave 150 acres (0.61 km^{2}) of land for setting up the first Gandhi Ashram in India to promote the production and sale of indigenously manufactured Khadi clothes.

== Accomplishments ==
The Hindi daily newspaper Aaj, a publication of Jnanamandal Limited, was started by Gupta in 1920 in order to facilitate the Indian struggle for freedom. Gupta was associated with the Indian National Congress as its treasurer for many years. He founded Mahatma Gandhi Kashi Vidyapeeth in Varanasi, which is now a university, to give a chance to the youth that left their studies and joined the freedom movement in India. Gupta donated one million rupees for this national educational institution. He built the Bharat Mata Mandir, in which a relief map of India is carved on marble. The temple was inaugurated by Gandhi in 1936.

The total expenditure and arrangement for The First National Congress to be held at Varanasi in 1928 was done by Gupta at his residence Seva Upawan, a Heritage Building designed by Sir Edwin Lutyens for his friend Mr. Catley, the collector of Varanasi and bought by Rashtraratana Ji in 1916. It was renamed to Seva Upawan by Gandhi, which was synonym of the hospitality the people were offered here. The building exists in an area of 75,000 sq ft (7,000 m^{2}) situated at the western bank of the river Ganges covered by 20 acres (81,000 m^{2}) of appertained land. Rashtraratan Jee donated Rs. 1,01,000/- as the first donation to build Benaras Hindu University for which a grand total of 50 lacs was collected under the instigation and leadership of Malviya Ji from the various Princely states and Industrial houses, in the beginning of the 20th century.

Gandhi conferred upon Gupta the title of "Rashtra Ratna – Jewel of the Nation".
