= Naheed Abidi =

Indian scholar of Sanskrit and writer

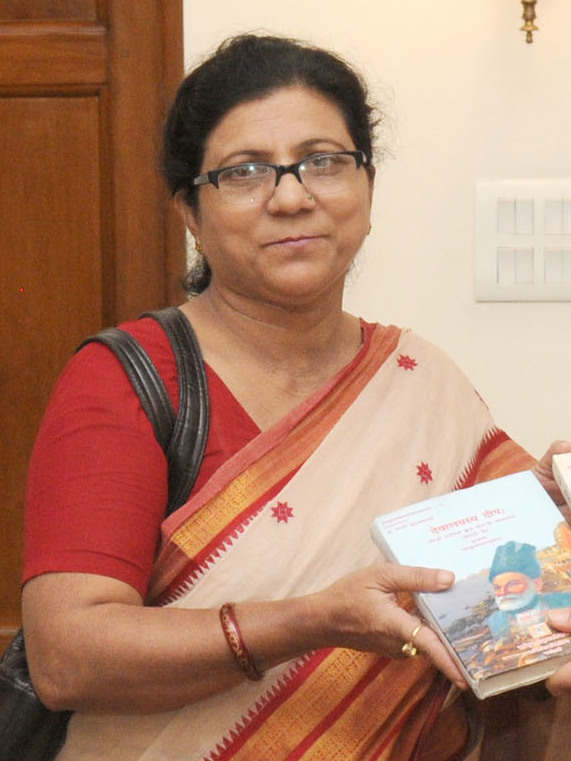
- Naheed Abidi, calls on Narendra Modi, the Prime Minister of India
- Born: 1961 (age 64–65); Mirzapur, Uttar Pradesh, India
- Occupations: Indian scholar and writer
- Spouse: Ehtesham Abidi
- Children: a son and a daughter
- Awards: Padma Shri
- Website: Official web site

Naheed Abidi is an Indian scholar of Sanskrit and writer. In 2014, she was honoured with Padma Shri, the fourth highest civilian award, for her contributions to the field of literature by the Government of India. She has received many awards and accolades for her contribution to Sanskrit literature & philosophy, notable among them are: Nawab Raza Ali Khan Award, 2018 for Sanskrit Language by Hon'ble Governor UP, Sri Ram Naik ji. The Late Smt. Chandrawati Joshi Sanskrit Bhasha Puraskar 2015 awarded by Gyan Kalyan Datavya Nyas, 6 Raisina Road, New Delhi. Janani Jagriti Darshan Samman by Ramayanam Trust, Ayodhya, Uttar Pradesh. Vikram Kalidas Puraskar by Kalidas Samiti, Government of M.P.; Dara Shikoh Sammaan & Yuva Pratibha Sammaan by Akhil Bhartiya Vidwat Parishad, Varanasi.

== Early life and education ==
Conferring Padma Shri award upon me is like honouring the Sanskrit world and it will inspire Muslims for Sanskrit learning. I am highly grateful to the scholars of Sanskrit and Persian who encouraged me in my objective of exploring the uniting the bond between the two faiths. Sanskrit is a rich language, which has the quality of promoting harmony and peace in the society. says Naheed Abidi

Abidi was born in 1961, in a Shia Muslim zamindari family at Mirzapur, in the Indian state of Uttar Pradesh. Choosing Sanskrit as her subject, Abidi did her graduation at the Kamla Maheshwari Degree College and secured her MA from the K. V. Degree College, Mirzapur. She moved to Varanasi, an ancient seat of Sanskrit scholarship after her marriage with Ehtesham Abidi - a Senior Advocate in the city. Varanasi is deemed holy by the Hindu text Garuda Purana. She went on to secure a doctoral degree (PhD) from the Mahatma Gandhi Kashi Vidyapith (MGKV), a public university in the city, and published her thesis titled as Vedic Sahitya Mein Ashvinon Ka Swaroop (The Utility and Form of Ashvin brothers in Vedic Literature) in 1993. She received her D.Litt. degree from Lucknow University (Sanskrit) in 2009.

== Career ==
In 2005, Abidi started working as a lecturer without any pay at Banaras Hindu University. Soon after, she joined the Mahatma Gandhi Kashi Vidyapith to work as a part-time lecturer on a daily wage scheme. However, the Sanskrit scholar, known as the first Muslim female to have worked as a lecturer in Sanskrit, had difficulties finding a regular job. Her first book was published in 2008 and was titled Sanskrit Sahitya Mein Rahim - which is an account of the Sanskrit leanings of the renowned poet, Abdul Rahim Khan-e-Khana. This was followed by Devalayasya Deepa, a translation of Chirag-e-Dair, written by poet, Mirza Ghalib. The third book was Sirr-e-Akbar, a Hindi translation of 50 Upanishads, earlier translated by the Mughal prince, Dara Shikoh into Persian. She has published a Hindi translation of Vedanta, translated into Persian by Dara Shikoh and also the Sufi texts by the prince.

Abidi lives with her spouse Ehtesham Abidi and her two children, a son and a daughter, in V.D.A. colony in the Shivpur area of Varanasi. She also serves as an Executive Council member at the Sampurnanad Sanskrit University.

== Awards and recognitions ==
Abidi was conferred with Padma Shri, in 2014, by the Government of India, for her services to literature. She has also been conferred DLitt by the Lucknow University. Abidi met Narendra Modi, the Prime Minister of India on 9 September 2014 at the latter's residence and presented two of the books written by her. The meeting was announced by Modi through a photo on his Google Plus page and the video of the meeting was displayed on the personal web site of the Prime Minister. In 2016, She was honored with the Yash Bharati Award by UP government at a function held in Lucknow.

Award	Awarded by	Year
Padma Award (Padma Sri)	President of India	2014
‘Yash Bharti’ Sammaan	Government of Uttar Pradesh	2016
Late Nawab Raza Ali Khan Award	Raza Library, Rampur, Uttar Pradesh	2018
Late Smt. Chandrawati Joshi Sanskrit Bhasha Puraskar	Sri Gyan Kalyan Datavya Nyaas, New Delhi	2015
Janani Jagriti Darshan Samman	Ramayanam Trust, Ayodhya, U.P.	2011
Vikram Kalidas Puraskar	Kalidas Samiti, Govt. of M.P.	2009
Dara Shikoh Sammaan	Akhil Bhartiya Vidwat Parishad	2007
Yuva Pratibha Sammaan	Akhil Bhartiya Vidwat Parishad	2006

== Memberships/academic/social activities ==
- Member – NCMEI (National Commission for Minority Educational Institutions) MoHRD, GoI, 19 Jan to 7 April 2015, 7 December 2015 to 6 December 2020.
- Member – Academic Council, Aligarh Muslim University, Aligarh. 12 Feb 2020 to February 2022.
- Member – CBFC (Central Board of Film Certification), MoH&B, GoI • Member – CABE (Central Advisory Board of Education), MoHRD, GoI, CABE Resolution, 11 June 2015.
- Member – Selection Committee for selecting Maharishi Sandipani Rashtriya Ved Vidya Pratishthan Awaredee Nominated by Hon’ble HRD Minister, Ujjain, 31.05.2013.
- Member - Executive Council, (Chancellor's Nominee), Sampurnanand Sanskrit University, Varanasi (2007-09 & 2009–2011).
- Visiting professor in various Central and State Universities and Post Grad. Colleges such as M.M.V. (B.H.U.), M.G. Kashi Vidyapeeth etc. since past 22 years till 2015.
- Promoting Muslim girls and boys to study Sanskrit. Providing academic help for promotion of linguistic harmony.

== Literary contributions ==
- Naheed Abidi (2008). Devalayasya dipah. Rashtriya Sanskrit Sansthan. ISBN 9788186111536.
- Naheed Abidi (2006). Sanskrit Sahitya Mein Rahim. Hindi Book Centre. ISBN 9788186111321.
- Naheed Abidi (2021). Devalayasya Deepah 2nd Edition (2021). Rashtriya Sanskrit Sansthan. ISBN 8186111530
- Naheed Abidi (2022). Vartman Sandarbh Mein Vaidik Moolya (2022). National Book Trust. ISBN 9789354916243.

== Books in press ==
- "Vaidik Sahitya me Ashwinav: Bhartiya evam P𝑎̅shch𝑎̅tya Mat".
- A comparative study between Ishavasyopanishad by Acharya Shankar and by Dara Shikoh.
- Raheemkavye Sanskritsahitasya Prabhavah etc.

== Visits ==
Attended and presented in more than 200 National and International seminars and conferences: the most recent one being the World Conference organized by Madrasa Ayatullah Zafar-ul Millat (June 2018) in Iraq & Iran on the topic “Shia Azadari in India”, which also hosted many notable clerics & educationists.

== See also ==
- Mahatma Gandhi Kashi Vidyapith
- Abdul Rahim Khan-I-Khana
