= Subramania Bharati =

Indian writer, poet, and Independence activist

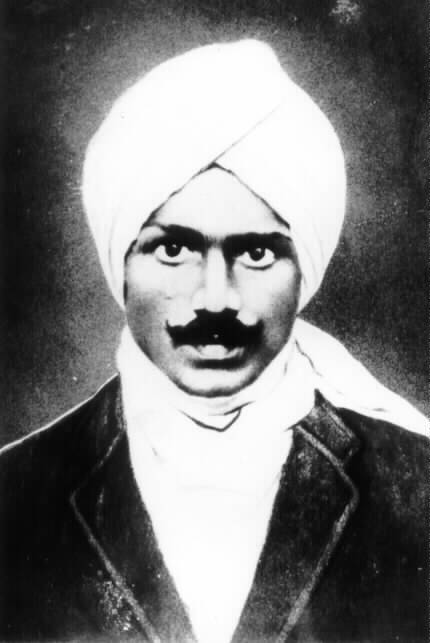
- Subramania Bharati
- Born: 11 December 1882; Ettayapuram, Tirunelveli district, Madras Presidency, British India (present-day Thoothukudi district, Tamil Nadu, India)
- Died: 11 September 1921 (aged 38); Madras, Madras Presidency, British India (present-day Tamil Nadu, India)
- Other names: Bharatiyar, Subbaiah, Sakthi Dasan, Mahakavi, Mundasu Kavignar, Veera Kavi
- Citizenship: Indian
- Occupations: Writer; Poet; Composer; Journalist; Teacher; Indian Independence Activist; Social reformer; Polyglot
- Movement: Indian independence movement
- Spouse: Chellamma (m. 1896–1921)
- Children: 2
- Family: Rajkumar Bharathi (great-grandson)

Subramania Bharati (Note: Birth name: Chinnaswami Subramaniyan, person's given name is Subramaniyan and father's given name is Chinnaswami. C. Subramaniyan by the prevalent patronymic initials as prefix naming system in Tamil Nadu and it is Subramaniyan Chinnaswami by the patronymic suffix naming system. Bharathi is a conferred title meaning blessed by the goddess of learning. His name became C. Subramania Bharati and he is also widely known mononymously as Bharati. In this article, the subject is referred to using his title Bharati because the subject is generally mentioned by his title.) (born Chinnaswami Subramaniyan; 11 December 1882 – 11 September 1921) was an Indian writer, poet, composer, journalist, teacher, Indian independence activist, social reformer, and polyglot. He was bestowed the title Bharati for his poetry and was a pioneer of modern Tamil poetry. He is popularly known by his title Bharati or Bharatiyar and also by the other title "Mahakavi Bharati" ("the great poet Bharati"). His works included patriotic songs composed during the Indian Independence movement. He fought for the emancipation of women, against child marriage, opposed the caste system, and advocated reforms of the society and religion.

Born in Ettayapuram, in the Tirunelveli district (present-day Thoothukudi) in 1882, Bharati had his early education in Tirunelveli. He later lived in Varanasi for sometime where he was exposed to Hindu theology and new languages. He worked as a journalist with many newspapers, including Swadesamitran, The Hindu, Bala Bharata, Vijaya, Chakravarthini and India. He considered Sister Nivedita, a disciple of Swami Vivekananda, as his guru.

In 1908, the British Government issued an arrest warrant for Bharati which pushed him to live in exile in the French-controlled Pondicherry for about ten years until 1918. He was attacked by an Indian elephant at Thiruvallikeni Parthasarathy Temple whom he fed daily and died a few months later on 11 September 1921.

Bharati was well-versed in several languages and had a deep passion for Tamil. His works covered political, social and spiritual themes. Songs and poems composed by Bharati are widely used in Tamil literature, music and daily life. His works include Panjali Sabatham, Kannan Paatu, Kuyil Paatu, Paapa Paatu, Chinnanchriu Kiliye, Vinayagar Nanmanimalai and Tamil translations of Patanjali's Yoga Sutra and Bhagavat Gita. Bharati was the first poet whose literature was nationalized in 1949.

== Early life ==
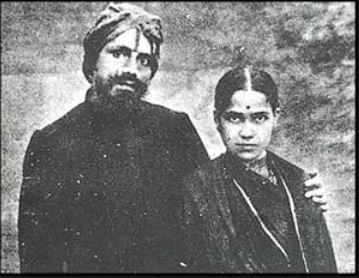
Subramanya Bharati with his wife Chellamma

Subramaniyan was born on 11 December 1882 in a Tamil Brahmin Iyer family in the town of Ettayapuram in Tirunelveli district, Madras Presidency (present day Thoothukudi district, Tamil Nadu) to Chinnaswami Iyer and Lakshmi Ammal. He was called as Subbaiah by his parents. His mother died in 1887 when he was five years old and he was brought up by his father and his grandmother.

Subramaniyan's father wanted him to learn English and Maths and become an engineer. From a young age, Subramaniyan was inclined towards music and poetry. At the age of 11, he was given the title of "Bharati" (meaning blessed by the goddess of learning Saraswati) for his excellence in poetry. In 1897, at the age of 15, he married Chellamma, who was then seven years old. His father died when he was sixteen. After the death of his father, he wrote a letter to the Raja of Ettayapuram, requesting for financial assistance. He was granted a job in the court of Ettayapuram, which he left after a while and went to Varanasi. During his stay in Varanasi, he was exposed to Hindu spirituality and nationalism and learned new languages such as Sanskrit, Hindi and English. He also changed his outward appearance, growing a beard and started wearing a turban.

== Literary life and independence activism ==
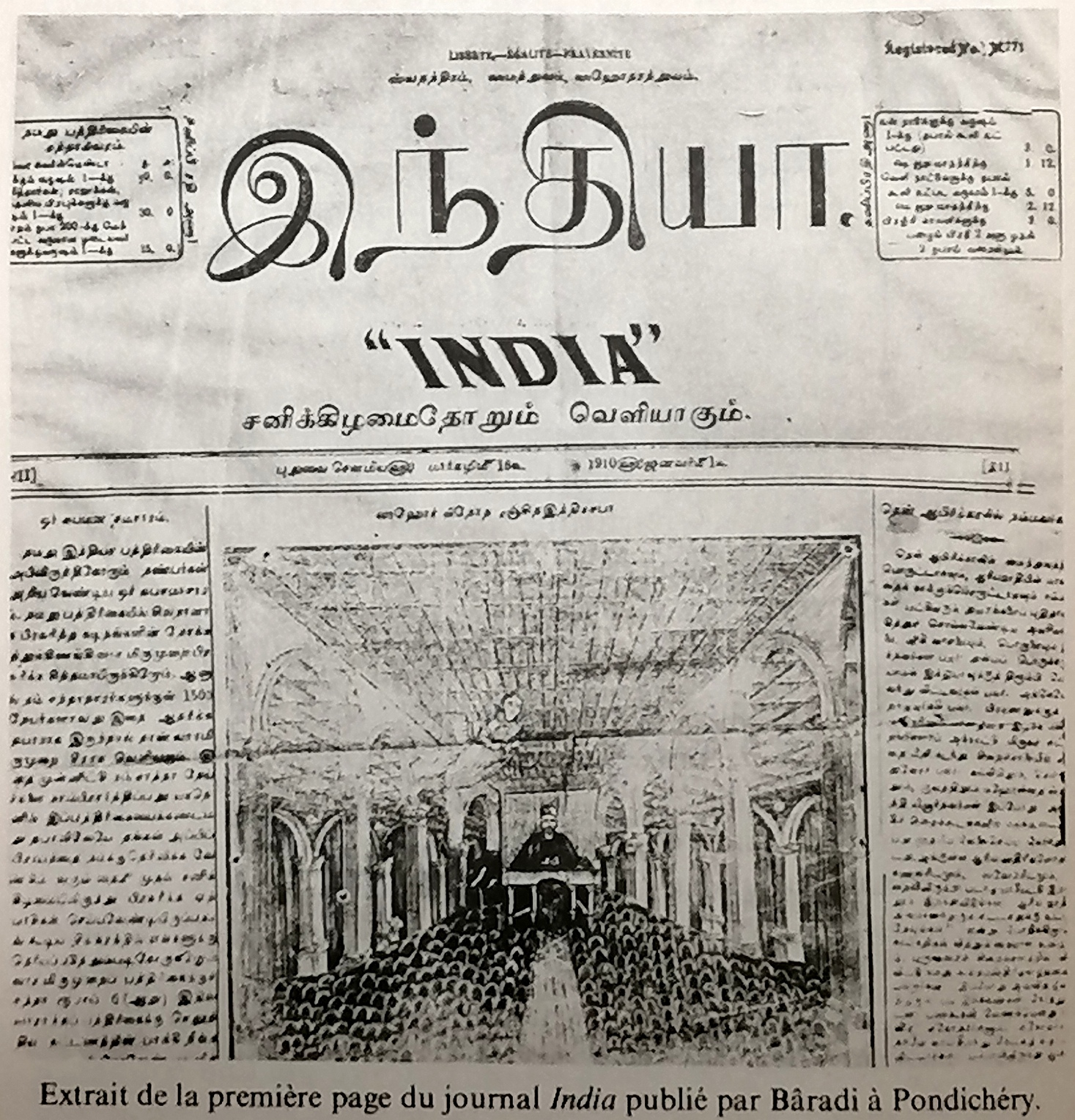
India weekly newspaper edited by Bharati c. 1907

Bharati returned to Ettayapuram during 1901 and served as the chief court poet of the Raja of Ettayapuram. He served as a Tamil teacher from August to November 1904 in Sethupathy High School in Madurai. During this period, Bharati understood the need to be well-informed of the world outside and took interest in the world of journalism and the print media. In the same year, Bharati joined as an assistant editor at Swadesamitran, a Tamil daily. In December 1905, he attended a session of Indian National Congress in Varanasi. On his journey back home, he met Sister Nivedita, who was Swami Vivekananda's spiritual heir. She inspired Bharati to recognize the rights and privilege of women. Bharati considered her as an embodiment of Hindu goddess Shakti and considered Nivedita as his Guru. He later attended the Indian National Congress session in Calcutta held under Dadabhai Naoroji, which demanded Swaraj and boycott of British goods.

By April 1907, he started editing the Tamil weekly India and the English newspaper Bala Bharatham along with M.P.T. Acharya. These newspapers served as a means of expressing Bharati's creativity and he continued to write poems in these editions. His writings included diverse topics ranging from nationalism to contemplations on the relationship between God and Man. He also wrote on the Russian and French Revolutions.

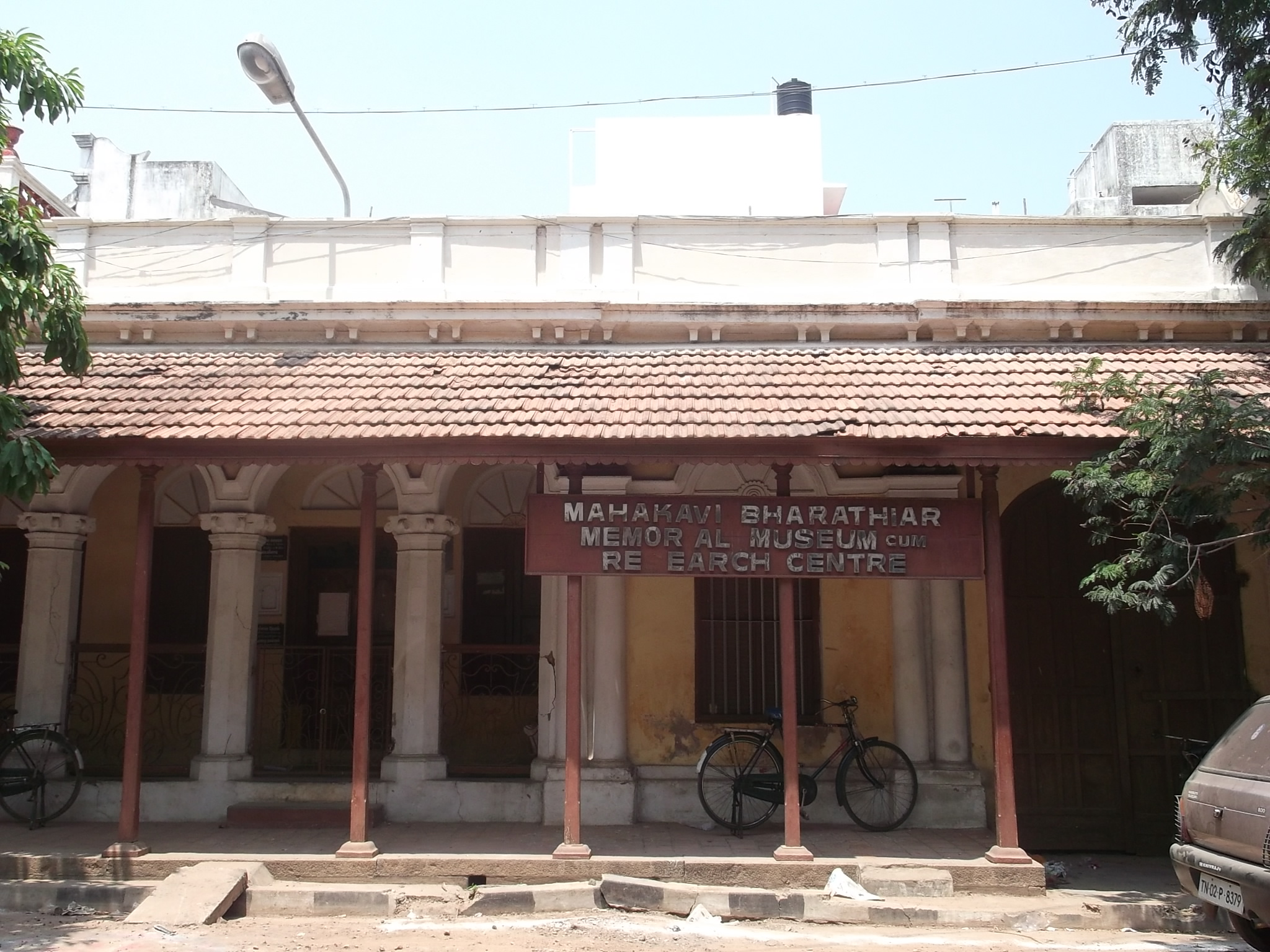
The house in which Bharati lived in Pondicherry

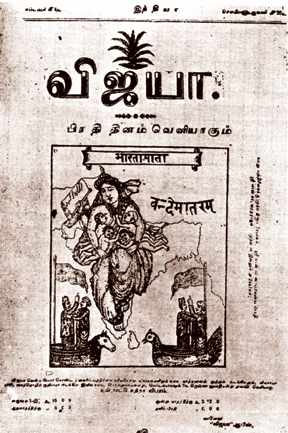
Cover page of the 1909 magazine Vijaya, published first from Pondicherry

Bharati participated in the Indian National Congress meeting held in Surat in 1907 along with V.O. Chidambaram Pillai and Mandayam Srinivachariar. The meeting deepened the divisions within the Congress with a section preferring armed resistance. This section was primarily led by Bal Gangadhar Tilak, which was supported by Bharati, Chidambaram Pillai and Varathachariyar. In 1908, the British instituted a case against Chidambaram Pillai. In the same year, the proprietor of the journal India in which Bharati was writing, was arrested in Madras. Faced with the prospect of an imminent arrest, Bharati escaped to Pondicherry, which was under the French rule.

In Pondicherry, Bharati edited and published the weekly journal India, a Tamil daily Vijaya, an English monthly Bala Bharatham and a local weekly Suryodayam. The British tried to ban Bharati's publications and the newspapers India and Vijaya were banned in British India in 1909. During his exile, Bharati had the opportunity to meet other revolutionary leaders of the Indian Independence movement like Aurobindo, Lajpat Rai and V. V. Subrahmanya Iyer, who had also sought asylum under the French. Bharati assisted Aurobindo in publishing the journals Arya and Karma Yogi. He also started learning Vedic literature. Three of his greatest works namely, Kuyil Pattu, Panjali Sabatham and Kannan Pattu were composed during 1912. He also translated Vedic hymns, Patanjali's Yoga Sutra and Bhagavat Gita to Tamil language.

When Bharati entered the British India near Cuddalore in November 1918, he was arrested. He was imprisoned in the Central prison in Cuddalore for three weeks from 20 November to 14 December. He was released after the intervention of Annie Besant and C.P. Ramaswamy Aiyar. He was stricken by poverty and ill health during this period. In the following year, Bharati met Gandhi for the first time. He resumed editing Swadesamitran in 1920 from Madras.

== Death ==
Bharati was badly affected by the imprisonments and struggled from ill health. In 1920, a general amnesty was issued which finally removed restrictions on his movements. He delivered his last speech at Karungalpalayam Library in Erode on the topic Man is Immortal. He was struck by a temple elephant named Lavanya at the Thiruvallikeni Parthasarathy Temple whom he used to feed often. When he fed a coconut to the elephant, the elephant attacked him. Although he survived the incident, his health deteriorated. A few months later, he died in the early morning on 11 September 1921. Though Bharati was considered a great poet and nationalist, it was recorded that only 14 people attended his funeral.

== Literary work ==
Subramanya Bharathi's Tamil songs .
Suttum vizhi

Ninnai charan adaindhen

Chinnan chiru kiliye

Senthamizh naadu ennum podhinile

Aasai mugam

Bharati was one of the pioneers of modern Tamil literature. He is known by the nickname "Mahakavi" ("The Great Poet"). Bharati used simple words and rhythms, unlike the previous century works in Tamil, which had complex vocabulary. He also proposed novel ideas and techniques in his poems. He used a metre called Nondi Chindu in most of his works, which was earlier used by Gopalakrisnha Bharathiar.

Bharati's poetry expressed progressive and reformist ideals. His poetry was a forerunner to modern Tamil poetry in different aspects and combined classical and contemporary elements. He penned thousands of verses on diverse topics like Indian Nationalism, love, children, nature, glory of the Tamil language, and odes to prominent freedom fighters. He fought for the emancipation of women, against child marriage, vehemently opposed the caste system, and stood for reforming society and religion. His poems were the first to be nationalized in India in 1949.

His works include Panjali Sabatham, Kannan Paatu, Kuyil Paatu, Paapa Paatu, Chinnanchriu Kiliye and Vinayagar Nanmanimalai. He also translated Patanjali's Yoga Sutra and Bhagavat Gita to Tamil. Apart from this he also wrote various patriotic songs, religious verses, short stories and translations of speeches of reformist leaders.

== Legacy ==
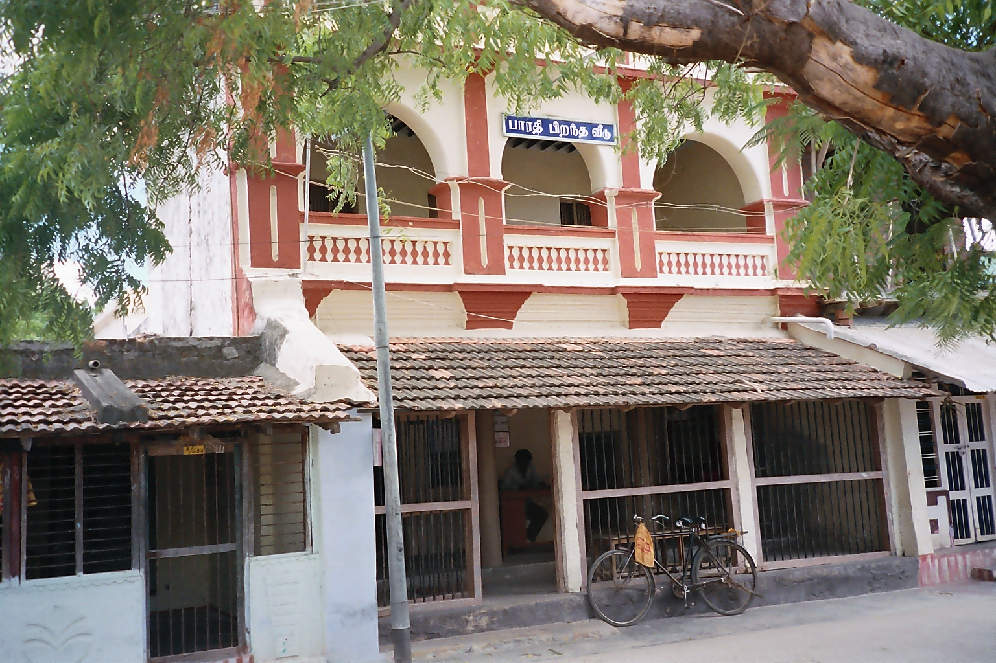
Bharati's house in Ettayapuram

The last years of his life were spent in a house in Thiruvallikeni in Chennai. The house was bought and renovated by the Government of Tamil Nadu in 1993 and named "Bharati Illam" (Home of Bharati). The house in which he was born in Ettayapuram and the house where he lived in Puducherry are maintained as memorial houses. A statue of Bharati, a memorial complex and a photo exhibition related to his life history are on display at Etayapuram, his birthplace.

In 1960, India Post issued a commemorative stamp on Bharati. The Subramanyam Bharti Award was constituted in 1987 to award contributions to literature. The award is conferred annually by the Ministry of Human Resource Development of Government of India. In 2021, Government of Tamil Nadu instituted a yearly "Bharati young poet Award". Statutes of Bharati include the Indian Parliament and Marina Beach facade in Chennai. Roads are named after him include Bharathiar road in Coimbatore and Subramaniam Bharti Marg in New Delhi. Several educational institutions are named after him including Bharathiar University, a state university, which was established in 1982 at Coimbatore. On 11 September 2021, on the 100th death anniversary of Bharati, then Indian prime minister Narendra Modi announced the establishment of a Subramania Bharati chair of Tamil Studies at the Banaras Hindu University.

== In popular culture ==
A Tamil film titled Bharathi was made in the year 2000 on the life of the poet by Gnana Rajasekaran, which won National Film Award for Best Feature Film in Tamil. The movie Kappalottiya Thamizhan based on the life of V. O. Chidambaram Pillai also chronicles the life of Bharati. The musical duo Hiphop Tamizha use a caricature of Bharati as a part of their logo. Many of the poems written by Bharati are used in various films in the form of songs. Phrases or lines from his poems are also used as film titles.

== See also ==
- Subramaniya Bharathi's works at Wikisource Tamil
