= Chandauli Lok Sabha constituency =

Lok Sabha constituency in Uttar Pradesh

Coordinates: 25.15°N 83.24°E

Chandauli UP-76
- Lok Sabha constituency
- Interactive Map Outlining Chandauli Lok Sabha constituency

Constituency details
- Country: India
- Region: North India
- State: Uttar Pradesh
- Assembly constituencies: Mughalsarai; Sakaldiha; Saiyadraja; Ajagara; Shivpur
- Established: 1957
- Reservation: None

Member of Parliament
- 18th Lok Sabha
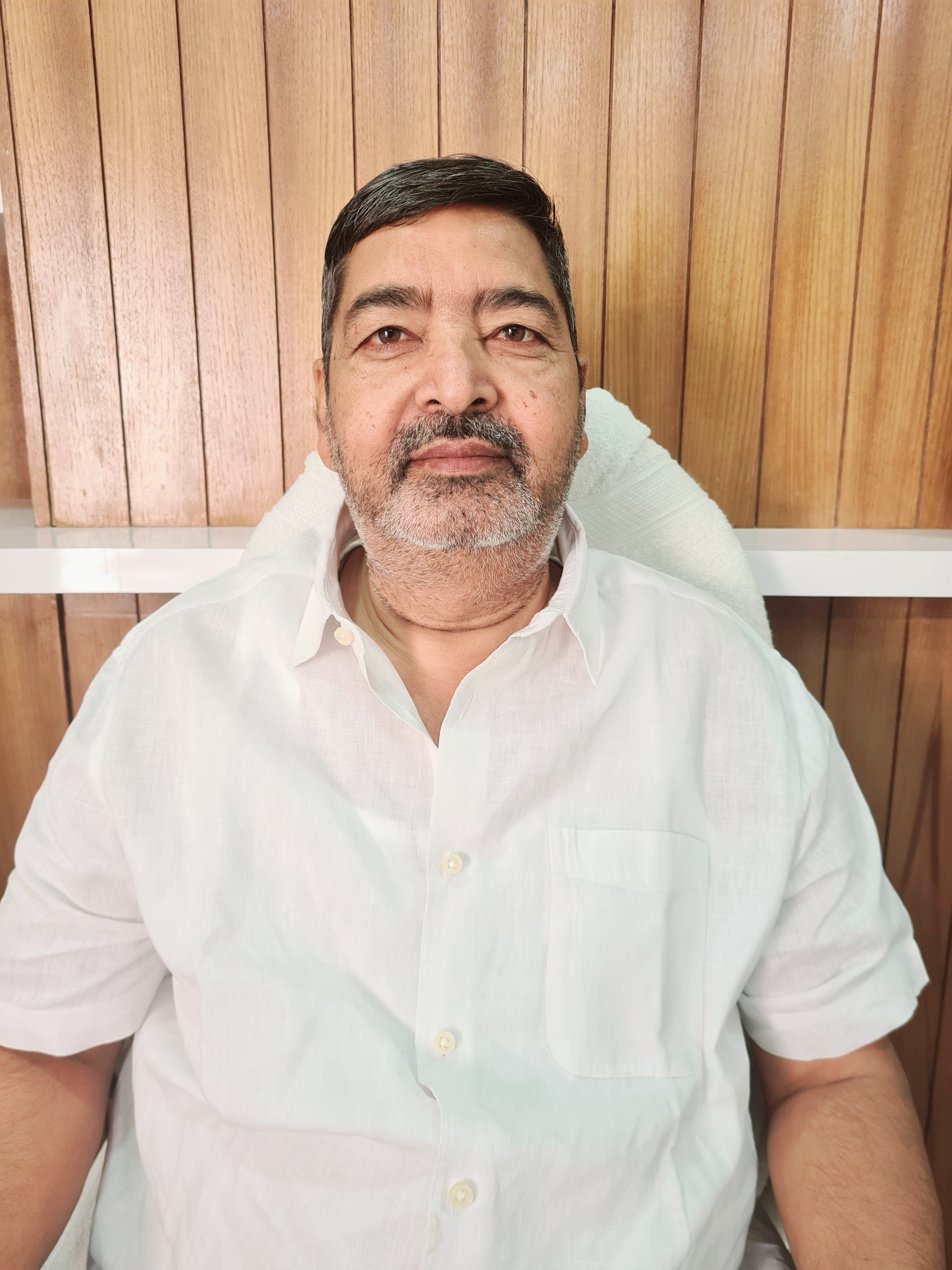
- Incumbent Virendra Singh
- Party: Samajwadi Party
- Elected year: 2024

Chandauli Lok Sabha constituency is one of the 80 Lok Sabha (parliamentary) constituencies in Uttar Pradesh state in northern India.

== Assembly segments ==
Presently, Chandauli Lok Sabha constituency comprises five Vidhan Sabha (legislative assembly) segments. These are:

No	Name	District	Member	Party	2024 Lead
380	Mughalsarai	Chandauli	Ramesh Jaiswal	BJP	SP
381	Sakaldiha	Chandauli	Prabhunarayan Yadav	SP	SP
382	Saiyadraja	Chandauli	Sushil Singh	BJP	SP
385	Ajagara (SC)	Varanasi	Tribhuwan Ram	BJP	SP
386	Shivpur	Varanasi	Anil Rajbhar	BJP	BJP

== Members of Parliament ==
Year	Member	Party
1957	Tribhuvan Narain Singh	Indian National Congress
1959^	Prabhu Narain Singh	Socialist Party
1962	Bal Krishna Singh	Indian National Congress
1967	Nihal Singh	Samyukta Socialist Party
1971	Sudhakar Pandey	Indian National Congress
1977	Narsingh Yadav	Janata Party
1980	Nihal Singh	Janata Party
1984	Chandra Tripathi	Indian National Congress
1989	Kailash Nath Yadav	Janata Dal
1991	Ananda Ratna Maurya	Bharatiya Janata Party
1996	Ananda Ratna Maurya	Bharatiya Janata Party
1998	Ananda Ratna Maurya	Bharatiya Janata Party
1999	Jawahar Lal Jaiswal	Samajwadi Party
2004	Kailash Nath Yadav	Bahujan Samaj Party
2009	Ramkishun Yadav	Samajwadi Party
2014	Mahendra Nath Pandey	Bharatiya Janata Party
2019	Mahendra Nath Pandey	Bharatiya Janata Party
2024	Virendra Singh	Samajwadi Party

== Election results ==
=== 2024 ===
2024 Indian general election: Chandauli
Party	Candidate	Votes	%	±%
SP	Virendra Singh	474,476	42.50	▼3.29
BJP	Mahendra Nath Pandey	4,52,911	40.57	▼6.50
BSP	Satyendra Kumar Maurya	1,59,903	14.32	▲14.32
NOTA	None of the Above	9,005	0.81	▲0.10
Jai Hind National Party	Sanjay Sinha	2,623	0.24	▲new
Majority		21,565	1.93	▲0.65
Turnout		11,16,499	60.57	▼1.26
SP gain from BJP		Swing		

=== 2019 ===
2019 Indian general elections: Chandauli
Party	Candidate	Votes	%	±%
BJP	Mahendranath Pandey	510,733	47.07	+4.84
SP	Sanjay Singh Chauhan	4,96,774	45.79	+24.97
Jan Adhikar Party	Shivkanya Kushwaha	22,291	5.75	
SBSP	Ramgovind	18,985	2.05	
NOTA	None of the Above	11,218	1.03	+0.71
Majority		13,959	1.28	−14.70
Turnout		10,86,193	61.83	+0.27
BJP hold		Swing	+4.84	

=== 2014 ===
2014 Indian general elections: Chandauli
Party	Candidate	Votes	%	±%
BJP	Mahendra Nath Pandey	414,135	42.23	
BSP	Anil Kumar Maurya	2,57,379	26.25	
SP	Ramkishun	2,04,145	20.82	
INC	Tarunendra Chand Patel	27,194	2.77	
AAP	Irshad	15,598	1.59	
NOTA	None of the Above	3,186	0.32	
Majority		1,56,756	15.98	
Turnout		9,80,654	61.56	
BJP gain from SP		Swing		

== See also ==
- Chandauli district
- List of constituencies of the Lok Sabha
