= Sushil Singh =

Indian politician

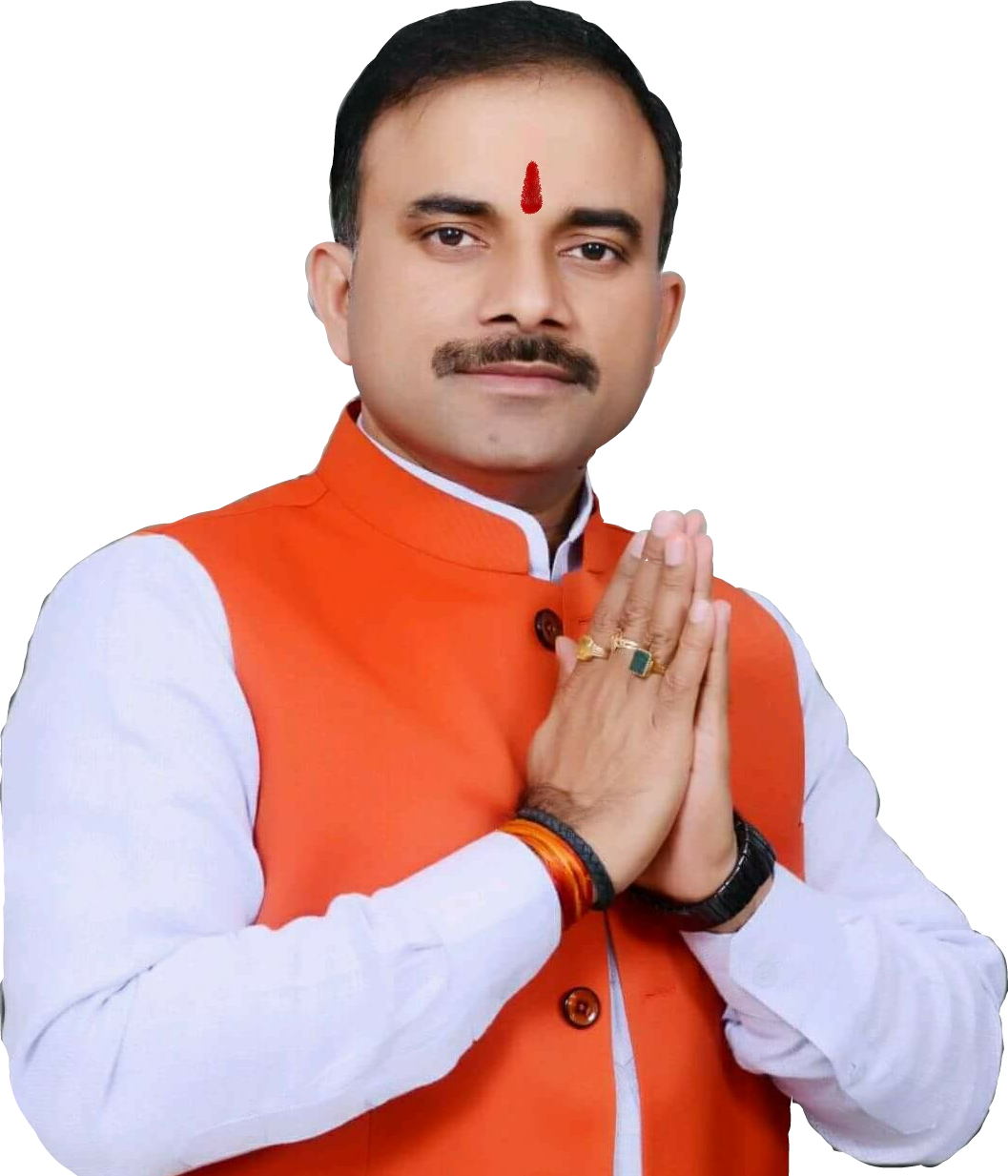

Member of Uttar Pradesh Legislative Assembly
- Incumbent
- Assumed office 2017
- Preceded by: Manoj Kumar Singh(Dablu)
- Constituency: Saiyadaraja
- In office 2012–2017
- Preceded by: New Constituency
- Succeeded by: Prabhunarayan Yadav
- Constituency: Sakaldiha
- In office 2007–2012
- Preceded by: Prabhunarayan Yadav
- Succeeded by: constituency abolished
- Constituency: Dhanapur

Personal details
- Party: Bharatiya Janata Party
- Spouse(s): Kiran Singh, Former Chairman, Zila Panchayat, Varanasi (2000-2005)
- Relations: Uday Nath Singh (father); Brijesh Kumar Singh (uncle); Sujit Singh (brother)
- Profession: Politician

Sushil Singh is an Indian politician and a member of the 18th Legislative Assembly of Uttar Pradesh of India. He represents the Saiyadraja Assembly constituency in Chandauli district of Uttar Pradesh and is a member of the Bharatiya Janata Party. He has served as an MLA for four terms. From 2007 to 2012 he was MLA for Dhanapur as a Bahujan Samaj Party candidate, and from 2012 to 2017 he was MLA for Sakaldiha as an independent. From 2017 onwards he has served as MLA for Saiyadraja as a member of the Bharatiya Janata Party. He is the nephew of Brijesh Kumar Singh.

== Personal life ==
Sushil Singh was born to Uday Nath Singh alias Chulbul. He graduated from Sitaram Singh Ramanand Singh Smarak College in Samenda, Azamgarh in 2019. He married Kiran Singh. Singh's father, Uday Nath, served as an MLC from Varanasi from 1997, and was arrested for reportedly carrying illegal firearms while campaigning for his daughter-in-law, (Note: Uday Nath Singh is alternatively described as campaigning for his sister-in-law instead in some sources.) who was contesting in the Sevapuri panchayat in 2000. The family continued to hold Uday Nath's seat from 1997 onwards.

== Political career ==
=== MLA for Dhanapur ===
In the 2002 Uttar Pradesh Legislative Assembly elections, Singh ran for the Dhanapur legislative assembly election as the Bahujan Samaj Party (BSP) candidate. Singh, however, lost to Prabhu Narayan of the Samajwadi Party (SP) in a close election, with Prabhu Narayan's 47,410 votes edging out Singh's 47,384.

He would make another attempt at becoming an MLA during the 2007 Uttar Pradesh Legislative Assembly elections. On 11 April 2007, Singh, then in Mirzapur jail due to being accused of murder, was escorted by police to file his nomination papers to compete in the Dhanapur elections, once again as the BSP candidate. Singh's second run, which he would compete from jail, would be far more successful, with him defeating the incumbent Prabhu Narayan (Note: Prabhu Narayan is instead known as Prabhu Nath Yadav in some sources) by 17,249 votes.

Shortly after being elected MLA for Dhanapur, Singh was transferred from Mirzapur jail to the district jail in Varanasi. Singh had surrendered himself in the Mirzapur court six months prior after being accused of orchestrating the murder of Sunil Singh, a contractor, in 2004. Sunil Singh died after being shot dead by a group of unidentified motorcycle-borne gunmen. Other sources instead report that Singh was accused of murdering Gajendra Singh, a coal trader, rather than a contractor. Singh's advocate denied these charges, stating that Singh was being targeted because of political reasons. He was granted bail in June 2007.

As MLA for Dhanapur, Singh worked to ensure his uncle Brijesh Kumar Singh received the BSP ticket, advocating his case with senior BSP leaders and with Chief Minister Mayawati. Despite these efforts, Mukhtar Ansari, described by The Times of India as being the arch rival of Brijesh Kumar, was able to secure the BSP's ticket for the Varanasi elections instead of Brijesh Kumar. Singh continued his lobbying despite this, but his efforts were cut short however after the police arrested Singh, Brijesh Kumar, and five others under the U.P. Gangsters Act after they were accused of attacking the SP's Jharkhand unit in-charge Sudhir Singh in March 2009. Sudhir Singh had previously complained to Delhi police in 2007 and 2008 of receiving threats to his life from Brijesh Kumar. The Singh family, despite these hindrances, was able to get Annapurna Singh, Brijesh Kumar's wife, the ticket for the Varanasi-Chandauli Legislative Council seat, as the BSP still desired a candidate capable of swaying the Thakur vote. She later won her elections.

Singh was often criticised for his criminal charges during his first term. Out of the BSP's 63 MLAs with criminal charges, Singh had the most, being implicated in over 25 cases by 2008. In 2010, Singh and Subodh Yadav were accused of threatening irrigation department engineers, reportedly wanting them to allot civil contracts to their respective families. This sparked the anger of the UP Engineers Association, who threatened to go on strike if action was not taken against the two accused. Mayawati allegedly tried to downplay the situation. Engineers in Ballia later ended up stalling work in protest. In 2011, Singh's residence was raided by the Central Bureau of Investigation, reportedly in connection with a coal smuggling racket. By 2012, Singh was in the top five among UP MLAs for number of pending criminal cases.

=== MLA for Sakaldiha ===
The BSP initially planned to field Singh once more in the 2012 Uttar Pradesh Legislative Assembly elections, though this time from the Sakaldiha Assembly constituency, which was created from the former Dhanapur Assembly constituency. Mayawati, however, would later deny him the ticket, with Singh consequently running as an independent. Singh won these elections.

Singh also served as a member of the Varanasi Zila Panchayat during this period. In 2012, after the SP came to power in the 2012 UP elections, he brought a no-confidence motion against the BSP-backed chairman of the Varanasi Zila Panchayat, Madhukar Maurya. Maurya lost the no-confidence motion by one vote, and new elections were then held to replace him, with Singh's brother, Sujit Singh, contesting in the new elections. However, the Uttar Pradesh State Election Commission (SEC) later found that one of the votes was fake. The district administration investigated the matter afterwards, and stated that the election of a new Zila Panchayat Chairman could not be held in a conducive manner, because, as The Times of India put it, the "dreaded dons led by Brijesh Singh were taking active part in it". The SEC consequently cancelled the election on 19 January 2013. Sujit Singh challenged the SEC's decision in the Allahabad High Court, and the court consequently stayed the SEC's cancellation of the elections. The Allahabad High Court's decision, however, was stayed by the Supreme Court after the SEC approached them. Maurya was consequently restored to the office of chairman of the Varanasi Zila Panchayat. Brijesh Kumar, however, brought a second no-confidence motion against Maurya, which this time passed unanimously. While the SEC judged this as unusual, they accepted the verdict regardless. New elections were held, and Sujit Singh was elected chairman of the Varanasi Zila Panchayat, replacing Maurya.

In October 2015, Singh's mother, Gulabi Singh, and Gulabi Singh's daughter-in-law, Indu Singh, were elected members of the Varanasi Zila Panchayat from Ward-22 Khargupur Raghunathpur and Ward-52 Raghunathpur respectively. Both won their elections unopposed.

=== MLA for Saiyadraja ===
In the lead-up to the 2017 Uttar Pradesh Legislative Assembly elections, Singh joined the Bharatiya Janata Party (BJP), and was allotted the BJP ticket to run from the Saiyadraja Assembly constituency, a seat which his uncle Brijesh Kumar had unsuccessfully contested from in 2012. Singh won the elections, defeating the BSP's Shyam Narayan Singh alias Vineet Singh.

In the 2022 Uttar Pradesh Legislative Assembly election, Singh ran for reelection from Saiyadraja. Singh won, defeating the SP's Manoj Singh Dabloo and joining the 18th Uttar Pradesh Assembly.

In August 2019, the Uttar Pradesh Special Task Force arrested three people, including the sharpshooter Shiv Prakash Tiwari alias Dhoni Tiwari, accused of planning to kill Singh.

In 2020, the Supreme Court ordered a special investigation team to reopen a formerly closed murder investigation against Singh for his alleged involvement in the murder of the BSP's Ram Bihari Chaubey. Chaubey had lost to Singh in the 2012 Sakaldiha elections and was planning on running again in 2017 when he was shot dead in 2015.

During his term as MLA for Saiyadraja, Singh has been involved in hosting kathas, including the Shri Ram Katha at Dashmi Talab in 2026.

== Posts held ==
#	From	To	Position	Constituency
01	2007	2012	Member, 15th Legislative Assembly	Dhanapur
02	2012	2017	Member, 16th Legislative Assembly	Sakaldiha
03	2017	2022	Member, 17th Legislative Assembly	Saiyad Raja
04	2022	Incumbent	Member, 18th Legislative Assembly	Saiyad Raja

== See also ==
- Bharatiya Janata Party
- Government of India
- Politics of India
- Uttar Pradesh Legislative Assembly
- Sakaldiha
