= Kailash Nath Singh Yadav =

Indian politician

Member of parliament, Lok Sabha
- In office 2004–2009
- Preceded by: Jawahar Lal Jaiswal
- Succeeded by: Ram Kishun Yadav
- Constituency: Chandauli

Member of parliament, Lok Sabha
- In office 1989–1991
- Preceded by: Chandra Tripathi
- Succeeded by: Anand Ratna Maurya

Member of the Uttar Pradesh Legislative Assembly
- In office 2002–2004
- Preceded by: Mahendra Nath Pandey
- Succeeded by: Rajnath Yadav
- Constituency: Saidpur

Minister of Science and Technology; Government of Uttar Pradesh
- In office 3 May 2002 – 29 August 2003
- Chief Minister: Mayawati
- Preceded by: President Rule
- Succeeded by: Virendra Singh

Minister of Water Resources, Land Development and Wasteland Development; Government of Uttar Pradesh
- In office 3 October 2002 – 29 August 2003
- Chief Minister: Mayawati
- Preceded by: Mayawati
- Succeeded by: Brijendra Pratap Singh

Personal details
- Born: 3 July 1957 (age 69) Varanasi, Uttar Pradesh
- Party: SP
- Other political affiliations: BSP; JD
- Spouse: Kumari Devi
- Children: Sunil Kumar Singh Yadav
- Education: Harish Chandra Postgraduate College, Gorakhpur University
- As of 17 September, 2006

Kailash Nath Singh Yadav (born 3 July 1957) is an Indian politician for the Chandauli (Lok Sabha constituency) in Uttar Pradesh. He was a member of the 14th Uttar Pradesh Legislative Assembly. He was the Minister of Science and Technology and Minister of Wasteland Development and Water Resources in the Mayawati-led Uttar Pradesh government from 2002 to 2003.
