= Guraini =

- Town
- Country: India
- State: Uttar Pradesh
- District: Chandauli

Population
  - Total: 1,340

Languages
  - Official: Hindi
- Time zone: UTC+5:30 (IST)
- Postal code: 232105

Guraini is a town near Dhanapur in the Chandauli District of Uttar Pradesh state, India. Guraini is 34 kilometres (21 mi) north of its district's main city, Chandauli.

Guraini is about 13 km from Zamania. A government school is located in Guaraini.
