= Katsila =

- Village
- Location in Uttar Pradesh, India Katsila (India)
- Coordinates: 25°18′48″N 83°19′49″E
- Country: India
- State: Uttar Pradesh
- District: Chandauli district
- Tehsil: Sakaldiha

Area
  - Total: 184.3 ha (455 acres)

Population (2011)
  - Total: 2,051
- 275 households
- Time zone: UTC+5:30 (IST)
- Postal Index Number: 232120

Katsila is a village in the Sakaldiha tehsil of Chandauli district in Uttar Pradesh, India. As of the 2011 Census of India, the village had a population of 2,051 people in 275 households. The village is listed under census village code 207280. The District Census Handbook for Chandauli records village-directory data for the district, including area and amenities.
