= Brijesh Kumar Singh =

Indian politician and gangster

Member of Uttar Pradesh Legislative Council
- In office 8 March 2016 – 7 March 2022
- Preceded by: Annapurna Singh
- Succeeded by: Annapurna Singh
- Constituency: Varanasi Local Authorities

Personal details
- Born: 1 July 1968 (age 57) Varanasi, Uttar Pradesh, India
- Party: Independent
- Spouse: Annapurna Singh (m. 1991)
- Relations: Late Uday Nath Singh alias Chulbul (ex-MLC); Sushil Singh (nephew)
- Parent: Late Ravindra Nath Singh (father)
- Profession: Politician
- Nickname: Arun

Brijesh Kumar Singh (also known as Arun) is an Indian Mafia Don turned politician and a former Member of Uttar Pradesh legislative council as an independent candidate.

== Political career ==
Brijesh Singh started his political career in year 2012 while being lodged in jail by contesting Assembly elections from Saiyadraja Vidhan Sabha as a candidate of PMSP, but lost by margin of 2,016 votes. Then he contested the Legislative Council elections in 2016 as an independent candidate from his ancestral Varanasi seat which his wife and elder brother represented earlier and won by a margin of 1,954 votes and became MLC.
