= Shivpur Assembly constituency =

Constituency of the Uttar Pradesh legislative assembly in India

Shivpur
- Constituency No. 386 for the Uttar Pradesh Legislative Assembly

Constituency details
- Country: India
- Region: North India
- State: Uttar Pradesh
- District: Varanasi
- Total electors: 3,41,279 (2017)
- Reservation: None

Member of Legislative Assembly
- 18th Uttar Pradesh Legislative Assembly
- Incumbent Anil Rajbhar
- Party: Bharatiya Janata Party
- Elected year: 2017

Shivpur Assembly constituency, formerly Chiraigaon is one of the 403 constituencies of the Uttar Pradesh Legislative Assembly, India. It is a part of the Varanasi district and one of the five assembly constituencies in the Chandauli Lok Sabha constituency. First election in this assembly constituency was held in 2012 after constituency came into existence when "Delimitation of Parliamentary and Assembly Constituencies Order, 2008" was passed in the year 2008.

== Wards and areas ==
Extent of Shivpur Assembly constituency is KCs Shivpur, Jallhupur, Lohta (CT), Phulwaria (CT), Shivdaspur (CT) & Maruadih Rly. Settlement (ITS) of Varanasi tehsil.

== Members of the Legislative Assembly ==
Year	Member	Party
Till 2012 : Constituency did not exist
2012	Uday Lal Maurya	Bahujan Samaj Party
2017	Anil Rajbhar	Bharatiya Janata Party
2022	Anil Rajbhar	Bharatiya Janata Party

== Election results ==
=== 2027 ===
2027 Uttar Pradesh Legislative Assembly election: Shivpur
Party	Candidate	Votes	%	±%
INDIA				
NDA				
BSP				
NOTA	None of the above			
Majority				
Turnout				
gain from		Swing		

=== 2022 ===
2022 Uttar Pradesh Legislative Assembly election: Shivpur
Party	Candidate	Votes	%	±%
BJP	Anil Rajbhar	115,231	45.76	▼2.71
SBSP	Arvind Rajbhar	87,544	34.77	
BSP	Ravi Maurya	40,601	16.12	▼4.35
INC	Girish	3,417	1.36	
NOTA	None of the above	2,295	0.91	▲0.55
Majority		27,687	10.99	▼12.82
Turnout		251,791	67.22	▲0.45
BJP hold		Swing		

=== 2017 ===
2017 Uttar Pradesh Legislative Assembly election: Shivpur
Party	Candidate	Votes	%	±%
BJP	Anil Rajbhar	110,453	48.47	
SP	Anand Mohan Yadav	56,194	24.66	
BSP	Virendra Singh	46,657	20.47	
NISHAD	Saroj Chaudhari	2,929	1.29	
Moulik Adhikar Party	Sriram	2,379	1.04	
NOTA	None of the above	812	0.36	
Majority		54,259	23.81	
Turnout		227,886	66.77	
BJP gain from BSP		Swing	+22.02	

=== 2012 ===
2012 Uttar Pradesh Legislative Assembly election: Shivpur
Party	Candidate	Votes	%	±%
BSP	Uday Lal Maurya	48,716	26.45	
SP	Dr. Piyush Yadav	36,084	19.59	
SBSP	Radha Krishna Yadav	32,758	17.79	
INC	Virendra Singh	32,518	17.66	
AD(K)	Iqbal Farooqi	13,565	7.37	
BJP	Rajendra Kushwaha	12,468	6.77	
Majority		12,632	6.86	
Turnout		1,84,165	62.95	
BSP hold		Swing		

== See also ==
- Chandauli Lok Sabha constituency
- Government of Uttar Pradesh
- List of Vidhan Sabha constituencies of Uttar Pradesh
- Sixteenth Legislative Assembly of Uttar Pradesh
- Uttar Pradesh Legislative Assembly
- Uttar Pradesh
- Varanasi district
