= Dhanapur =

Block in Chandauli district, Uttar Pradesh, India

- Block of Chandauli district
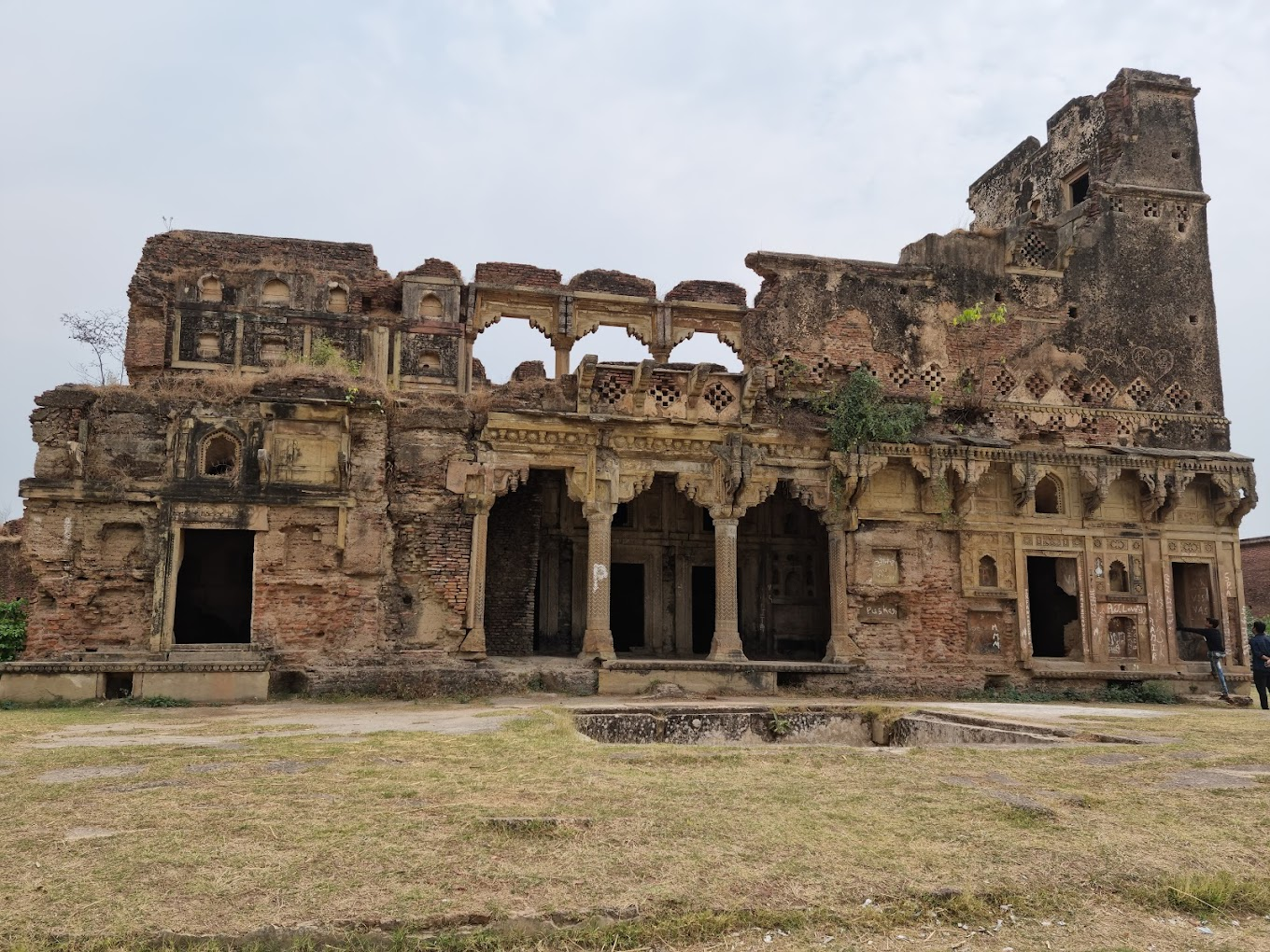
- Hetampur Fort

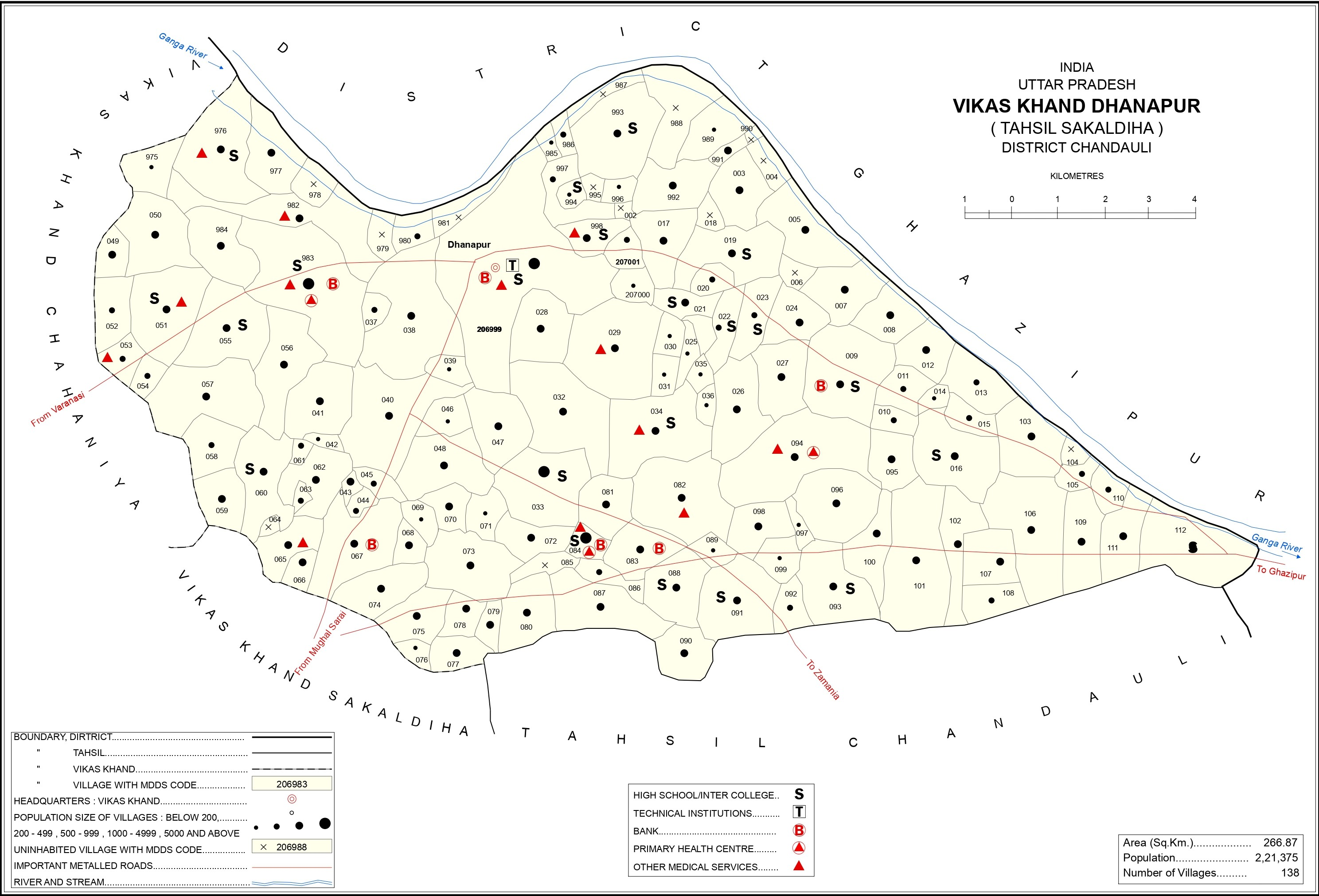
- Dhanapur block of Chandauli district

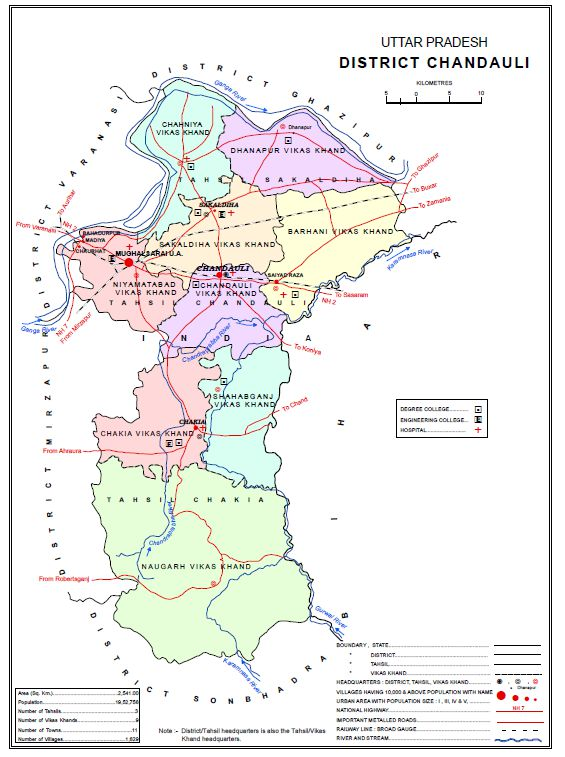
- Chandauli District Blocks Map
- Country: India
- State: Uttar Pradesh
- District: Chandauli
- Tehsil: Sakaldiha
- Block: Dhanapur
- Headquarter: Dhanapur

Government
  - Type: Panchayati raj
  - Block Development Officer: Not known
  - Vidhan sabha constituencies: Saiyad Raja
  - Member of Vidhan Sabha: Sushil Singh

Population (2011)
  - Total: 221,375

Demographics
  - Sex ratio: 947
- Time zone: UTC+05:30 (IST)
- Vehicle registration: UP-67
- LGD Code: 1619

Dhanapur is a block of Chandauli district in Uttar Pradesh in India. It falls under Sakaldiha tehsil region. Dhanapur village is the block headquarters. It is 15 km away from Chandauli town, the district headquarters. It is near the Ganges River basin and has a total of 84 gram panchayat.

- Dhanapur Block: Dhanapur block is a subdivision of the Chandauli district. It encompasses 84 gram panchayats, including Dhanapur Gram Panchayat.
- Dhanapur Gram Panchayat: It is a rural local body governance, falls within the Dhanapur block and governs multiple villages, including Dhanapur village.
- Dhanapur Village: Dhanapur village is one of the two villages that falls under the jurisdiction of the Dhanapur Gram Panchayat.

== History ==
Dhanapur village, known as Martyr's Land, played a significant role in the Indian Independence struggle. Citizens of Chandauli district actively participated, notably during the First War of Independence in 1857 and the Quit India Movement. On 16 August 1942, revolutionaries, including Heera Singh, Mahangu Singh, and Raghunath Singh, hoisted the tricolour at the police station, sacrificing their lives for the cause.

== Destinations ==
- The Hetampur Fort, situated at a distance of about 8.8 km from the block headquarters, is also 25 km from the national highway. Shershah Shuri's grantee Hetam Khan had built this fort in the 16th century spread over 3 acres. The fort was made of Lahori brick and Chunar sandstone and is currently taken under its protection by the Department of Archaeology.
- The Shaheed Sthal Samarak in Dhanapur village honors the freedom fighters. It stands as a tribute to their martyrdom and is a site of remembrance during national festivals.

== Demographics ==
Category in Dhanapur block (2011)
Category	Percent
Other	74.48%
Schedule Caste	23.37%
Schedule Tribe	2.05%

According to the 2011 census of India, Dhanapur block has a population of 221,375. It has a sex ratio of 947 females for every 1,000 males. 23.37% of the population in this block belong to scheduled cast category and 2.05% belong to scheduled tribes category. Bhojpuri is the local language of Dhanapur block. The Bhojpuri variant of Kaithi which actually related to a caste Kayastha is the indigenous script of Bhojpuri language.

Dhanapur village has population of 20,450. It has a sex ratio of 917 females for every 1,000 males. 16.69% of population in this gram panchayat belong to scheduled cast category and 2.36% belong to scheduled tribes category.

Data of 138 villages of respective gram panchayats
S. No.	Gram Panchayat	Village	Total Population	Scheduled Caste%	Scheduled Tribes%	Sex Ratio per 1000 male	Literacy Rate
1	Ahikaura	Jamalapur	0	0	0	0	0
1	Ahikaura	Orawlla	198	0	0	783	80.47
1	Ahikaura	Gobind Chak	113	90.27	0	738	79.57
1	Ahikaura	Ahikaura	4,312	25.6	2.09	967	68.95
1	Ahikaura	Ram Chander Patti	4	0	0	1000	100
1	Ahikaura	Bhatsa	383	14.36	0	1048	74.85
2	Amadpur	Gangwara Amadpur	0	0	0	0	0
2	Amadpur	Amadpur	3218	12.83	3.85	983	81.41
3	Amarraa	Amara	2495	6.85	0	1002	67.87
3	Amarraa	Bamanpur	118	0	0	966	82.86
4	Asavariya	Asavariya	1185	22.95	0.08	991	79.96
4	Asavariya	Kamalpur Kohna	588	0	3.23	1006	82.95
5	Ashok Nagar	Gauspur	1974	32.57	0.05	916	72.65
5	Ashok Nagar	Dubauliya	359	100	0	841	70.63
6	Autauli	Autauli	1819	6.05	0.38	1053	66.26
7	Avahi	Avahi	2100	23.24	0	875	73.34
7	Avahi	Hinauta	935	79.57	0	764	72.92
8	Awajapur	Awajapur	3426	41.16	4.67	952	76.7
9	Awti	Awti	3117	42.25	1.48	869	74.58
10	Babhaniyaw Thana	Babhaniyaw Thana	2506	35.08	5.83	944	74.24
11	Baghari	Baghari	1260	20.79	3.65	872	73.79
12	Bahadur Pur Lokuwa	Lokuwa	2327	37.6	5.2	947	76.94
13	Baheri	Baheri	3657	34.07	9.08	955	73.87
14	Bamhniya Rampur	Hashimpur	730	0.55	0	921	72.27
14	Bamhniya Rampur	Bamhniya Rampur	4507	20.08	1.35	983	74.03
15	Bewada	Bewada	1080	34.26	7.31	978	77.65
15	Bewada	Ranpur	979	37.9	1.94	1026	72.17
16	Bhadau	Bhadau	2322	41.26	0	1053	61.83
17	Budhe Pur	Arajidiyara	0	0	0	0	0
17	Budhe Pur	Budhe Pur	1175	21.87	4.51	799	78.73
17	Budhe Pur	Dulhachak	0	0	0	0	0
17	Budhe Pur	Naudhara	799	12.27	0	1043	80.06
18	Busgawa	Busgawa	2344	21.33	1.19	919	73.97
19	Dabariya	Dabariya	2043	22.47	0.39	1008	75.01
20	Dhanapur	Dhanapur	20450	16.67	2.36	915	75.53
20	Dhanapur	Gang Barar Dhanapur	0	0	0	0	0
21	Dharavn	Dharavn	4766	17.35	0.65	912	77.2
22	Dodhiya	Dodhiya	1264	23.42	0	944	69
23	Ekbalpur	Akabalpur	1085	2.76	1.57	934	76.16
24	Enamatpur	Enamatpur	3321	11.65	0.36	970	73.39
25	Gandhinagar Barhan	Shitalpur	801	0	0	858	70.17
25	Gandhinagar Barhan	Barhan	2821	19.96	0	932	73.76
26	Hetampur	Hetampur	1306	0.46	1	1034	78.49
27	Hingutar Jagdishpur	Hingutar Jagdishpur	5186	25.43	4.15	896	80.93
28	Jamurana	Devarapur	927	24.7	0.22	1135	65.89
28	Jamurana	Jamurana	1744	21.16	0.29	935	69.34
29	Jamurkha	Jamurkha	1824	27.91	0.6	986	78.34
30	Jiganaa	Jiganaa	1660	25.9	8.25	899	73.55
31	Kadirabad	Kadirabad	1207	17.15	0	956	78.41
32	Kamalpur	Kamalpur	6239	17.68	1.15	891	73.82
32	Kamalpur	Katkauliya	0	0	0	0	0
33	Karin	Karin	2222	23.18	0.09	992	68.84
34	Kawal Pura	Kawal Pura	1150	34.35	2.7	972	86.47
35	Kawipaharpur	Kawipaharpur	5671	12.17	1.04	911	66.2
36	Kharan	Kharan	4218	36.51	1.07	964	67.83
37	Kohara	Kohara	1688	17.24	3.61	983	78.18
38	Lalpur janauli	Janauli	1620	23.7	4.01	990	76.29
38	Lalpur janauli	Kamhari	289	72.66	0	817	65.74
39	Madhopur	Madhopur	2983	23.8	0.94	953	74.36
40	Maheshi	Marufapur	0	0	0	0	0
40	Maheshi	Maheshi	1311	8.01	9.23	1026	84.46
41	Mahuji	Mahuji	3766	20.74	0.05	923	71.11
42	Math Ucharhhal Giri	Math Ucharhhal Giri	814	0.86	5.28	1000	78.91
42	Math Ucharhhal Giri	Shivadasipur	713	19.21	10.94	927	80.98
43	Medhan	Dawan Pura	546	4.58	0	943	79.52
43	Medhan	Jamejay Pur	518	0	5.98	876	83.71
43	Medhan	Kodai	10	0	0	1000	100
43	Medhan	Medhan	2834	21.67	0.25	979	68.86
44	Mirjapur	Mirjapur	1141	47.06	3.16	1030	77.81
44	Mirjapur	Chitawal	345	98.84	0	982	51.74
44	Mirjapur	Karjaura	464	32.76	5.6	833	71.5
45	Mishra Pura	Baruada Khalsa	47	10.64	0	1350	71.79
45	Mishra Pura	Barauda Bamhnauli	700	2.14	0	1134	73.85
45	Mishra Pura	Puracheta Dube	590	2.37	3.9	1020	86.42
45	Mishra Pura	Pura Jagarnath Mishra	168	0	0	931	93.84
45	Mishra Pura	Purasheta Mishira I	111	0	0	982	90.11
45	Mishra Pura	Pura Sheta Mishera II	0	0	0	0	0
46	Murli Pur Vira Saray	Vira Saray	2258	12.09	3.23	934	66.44
46	Murli Pur Vira Saray	Bayanpur	514	45.33	0	925	77.51
47	Navrangabad	Navrangabad	1776	0	0	909	75.1
48	Negura	Negura	3727	35.82	0.27	986	66.16
49	Neknampur	Neknampur	2457	19.45	1.22	945	77.43
50	Nidilpur	Nidilpur	1967	22.52	2.03	1064	79.25
51	Odra Garupur	Odra Garupur	3342	14.93	0.81	990	67.72
52	Pagahi	Bagahi	2367	30.88	0	957	76.09
53	Panchang Pur	Gangwara Nakanwa Medhwa	0	0	0	0	0
53	Panchang Pur	Medhwa	437	0	0	1042	77.57
53	Panchang Pur	Gang Barar Nagwa	0	0	0	0	0
53	Panchang Pur	Nagwa	1253	38.63	2.63	936	64.34
54	Pandeypuri Milki	Pandeypuri Milki	1197	42.77	0	975	76.78
55	Papraul	Papraul	1276	27.51	0	1088	70.5
56	Parsahata	Parsahata	2121	15.98	2.88	949	79.66
57	Prahaladpur	Prahaladpur	1431	0	0	1038	60.59
58	Prakash Pur Mahuja	Lodhva	75	0	1.33	666	100
58	Prakash Pur Mahuja	Mahra	2522	15.5	1.47	910	73.93
59	Premasraya Pur	Maharai	156	29.49	0	974	72.79
59	Premasraya Pur	Gurehoo	2820	20.18	0	931	69.45
60	Raitha	Raitha	2361	35.49	3.09	949	76.57
61	Rampur Diya	Diya	2865	12.67	0.91	911	76.37
61	Rampur Diya	Gaddochak	381	0	0	914	72.37
62	Ramrupdaspur	Ramrupdaspur	1923	19.45	5.93	924	77.5
62	Ramrupdaspur	Visunpura Khurd	642	0	0	1006	57.65
62	Ramrupdaspur	Bisunpur	0	0	0	0	0
63	Sakarari	Sakarari	1565	30.42	0	1008	79.01
64	Sangrampur	Lakhipur	881	3.06	1.7	902	69.88
64	Sangrampur	Manni Patti	684	0	0	965	72.55
65	Shahidgawan	Shri Kantpur	570	3.16	9.12	938	86.21
65	Shahidgawan	Dedhwaliya	709	0	0	980	85.71
66	Shantipur Torwan	Torwan	3927	22.23	2.6	945	74.58
66	Shantipur Torwan	Bhart Patti	0	0	0	0	0
66	Shantipur Torwan	Neerapur	514	59.53	4.28	946	58.84
67	Silauta	Silauta	1707	33.39	2.87	896	66.11
67	Silauta	Mangalpur	201	0	0	951	78.43
68	Sisaura Kala	Sisaura Kala	3151	37.38	4.44	973	75.21
68	Sisaura Kala	Sisaura Khurd	0	0	0	0	0
69	Sonhuli	Sonhuli	1950	22.62	2.41	948	77.43
69	Sonhuli	Gang Barar Sonhuli	0	0	0	0	0
70	Sraswatipur	Nailipati Pashchim	1823	20.95	6.58	931	74.95
70	Sraswatipur	Nailipatti Purba	638	24.92	2.51	975	77.5
70	Sraswatipur	Odhwa	79	60.76	0	1025	64.18
71	Saraya	Sarya	522	0	0	1079	67.5
71	Saraya	Rasulpur	496	26.81	2.62	1049	91.1
72	Tribhuwanpur	Phoolpur Urf Prasadpur	596	10.91	1.51	898	53.15
72	Tribhuwanpur	Khar Kholi	801	7.99	4.12	871	76.07
72	Tribhuwanpur	Marai	727	64.79	0	888	66.94
73	Vardisara	Vardisara	2173	48.73	3.82	850	73.74
74	Vijayipur	Nonari	401	0	0	956	82.09
74	Vijayipur	Kaudharpur	1047	33.24	0	938	70.26
75	Virana	Virana	3524	41.23	6.81	940	59.81
76	Visunpur Kala	Visunpur Kala	1930	52.49	2.12	1010	76.79
77	Alamkhatopur	Alamkhatopur	1028	33.46	0	954	55.26
78	Chilbili	Chilbili	1326	36.12	0	1065	52.9
79	Gajendrpur	Gajendrpur	1571	13.94	0	951	75.77
80	Guraini	Guraini	1108	17.87	0	916	79.09
81	Jivanpur	Jivanpur	1101	66.76	0	931	74.11
82	Karjara	Karjara	1338	48.51	1.2	950	76.98
83	Kisunpura	Kisunpura	1755	6.61	1.77	930	58.17
84	Ramarepur	Ramarepur	1071	12.51	0	1091	79.56

== Administrations and politics ==
Administration

Dhanapur block which consists of 84 gram panchayat, and is headed by the Block Development Officer of Dhanapur block. A Civil service officer of the rank of Block Development Officer (BDO) is the in-charge of a CD Block in India. BDO are usually officers of representative state-governments. BDO reports to the Sub Divisional Magistrate (SDM). The BDO's office is the main operational wing of the government for the development administration as well as regulatory administration.

Politics

Dhanapur Panchayat Samiti is a Rural Local Body Governance in Chandauli Zila Parishad. There are total 84 Gram Panchayats and under Dhanapur panchayat samiti jurisdiction. The samiti is elected for five years and is headed by a chairman/president and deputy chairman/vice president elected by the members of the panchayat samiti. One Sarpanch samiti supervises the other gram panchayats. It acts as a coordinating body between zila parishad and gram panchayat.

Dhaanapur Gram Panchayat is a Rural Local Body Governance in Dhanapur Panchayat Samiti part of Chandauli Zila Parishad. There are total 2 Villages under Dhaanapur Gram Panchayat jurisdiction. Gram Panchayat Dhanapur is further divided into 15 Wards. Gram Panchayat Dhanapur has total 15 elected members by people. Dhanapur Gram Panchayat has total 8 full time government employees.

138 Villages and 84 Gram Panchayats
Panchayat Code	Gram Panchayat	Pincode	Numbers of Wards	Villages
57899	Ahikaura	232106	15	Jamalapur
57899	Ahikaura	232106	15	Orawlla
57899	Ahikaura	232106	15	Gobind Chak
57899	Ahikaura	232106	15	Ahikaura
57899	Ahikaura	232106	15	Ram Chander Patti
57899	Ahikaura	232106	15	Bhatsa
57900	Amadpur	232105	15	Gangwara Amadpur
57900	Amadpur	232105	15	Amadpur
57901	Amarraa	232106	13	Amara
57901	Amarraa	232106	13	Bamanpur
57902	Asavariya	232105	11	Asavariya
57902	Asavariya	232105	11	Kamalpur Kohna
57903	Ashok Nagar	232106	20	Gauspur
57903	Ashok Nagar	232106	20	Dubauliya
57904	Autauli	232105	11	Autauli
57905	Avahi	232106	15	Avahi
57905	Avahi	232106	15	Hinauta
57906	Awajapur	232108	15	Awajapur
57907	Awti	232106	15	Awti
57908	Babhaniyaw Thana	232105	13	Babhaniyaw Thana
57909	Baghari	232105	11	Baghari
57910	Bahadur Pur Lokuwa	232108	13	Lokuwa
57911	Baheri	232106	15	Baheri
57912	Bamhniya Rampur	232108	15	Hashimpur
57912	Bamhniya Rampur	232108	15	Bamhniya Rampur
57913	Bewada	232105	13	Bewada
57913	Bewada	232105	13	Ranpur
57914	Bhadau	232108	13	Bhadau
57915	Budhe Pur	232108	11	Arajidiyara
57915	Budhe Pur	232108	11	Budhe Pur
57915	Budhe Pur	232108	11	Dulhachak
57915	Budhe Pur	232108	11	Naudhara
57916	Busgawa	232105	13	Busgawa
57917	Dabariya	232105	13	Dabariya
57918	Dhanapur	232105	15	Dhanapur
57918	Dhanapur	232105	15	Gang Barar Dhanapur
57919	Dharavn	232105	15	Dharavn
57920	Rampur Diya	232107	15	Diya
57920	Rampur Diya	232107	15	Gaddochak
57921	Enamatpur	232106	15	Enamatpur
57922	Gandhinagar Barhan	232106	15	Shitalpur
57922	Gandhinagar Barhan	232106	15	Barhan
57923	Hetampur	232106	11	Hetampur
57924	Hingutar Jagdishpur	232108	15	Hingutar Jagdishpur
57925	Jamurana	232108	13	Devarapur
57925	Jamurana	232108	13	Jamurana
57926	Jamurkha	232106	11	Jamurkha
57927	Jiganaa	232106	11	Jiganaa
57928	Kadirabad	232106	11	Kadirabad
57929	Kamalpur	232106	15	Kamalpur
57929	Kamalpur	232106	15	Katkauliya
57930	Karin	232107	13	Karin
57931	Kawal Pura	232107	11	Kawal Pura
57932	Kawipaharpur	232106	15	Kawipaharpur
57933	Kharan	232106	13	Kharan
57934	Kohara	232105	11	Kohara
57935	Lalpur Janauli	232106	11	Janauli
57935	Lalpur Janauli	232106	11	Kamhari
57937	Maheshi	232108	11	Marufapur
57937	Maheshi	232108	11	Maheshi
57938	Mahuji	232106	15	Mahuji
57939	Medhan	232107	15	Dawan Pura
57939	Medhan	232107	15	Jamejay Pur
57939	Medhan	232107	15	Kodai
57939	Medhan	232107	15	Medhan
57940	Mirjapur	232108	11	Mirjapur
57940	Mirjapur	232108	11	Chitawal
57940	Mirjapur	232108	11	Karjaura
57941	Mishra Pura	232105	11	Baruada Khalsa
57941	Mishra Pura	232105	11	Barauda Bamhnauli
57941	Mishra Pura	232105	11	Puracheta Dube
57941	Mishra Pura	232105	11	Pura Jagarnath Mishra
57941	Mishra Pura	232105	11	Purasheta Mishira I
57941	Mishra Pura	232105	11	Pura Sheta Mishera II
57942	Murli Pur Vira Saray	232106	13	Vira Saray
57942	Murli Pur Vira Saray	232106	13	Bayanpur
57943	Navrangabad	232106	11	Navrangabad
57944	Negura	232105	15	Negura
57945	Neknampur	232105	13	Neknampur
57946	Nidilpur	232105	11	Nidilpur
57947	Odra Garupur	232106	20	Odra Garupur
57948	Pagahi	232105	13	Bagahi
57949	Panchang Pur	232105	11	Gangwara Nakanwa Medhwa
57949	Panchang Pur	232105	11	Medhwa
57949	Panchang Pur	232105	11	Gang Barar Nagwa
57949	Panchang Pur	232105	11	Nagwa
57950	Papraul	232105	11	Papraul
57951	Parsahata	232107	13	Parsahata
57952	Prahaladpur	232105	11	Prahaladpur
57953	Prakash Pur Mahuja	232106	13	Lodhva
57953	Prakash Pur Mahuja	232106	13	Mahra
57955	Raitha	232106	13	Raitha
57956	Ramrupdaspur	232106	13	Ramrupdaspur
57956	Ramrupdaspur	232106	13	Visunpura Khurd
57956	Ramrupdaspur	232106	13	Bisunpur
57957	Shahidgawan	232108	11	Shri Kantpur
57957	Shahidgawan	232108	11	Dedhwaliya
57958	Sakarari	232105	11	Sakarari
57960	Shantipur Torwan	232105	15	Torwan
57960	Shantipur Torwan	232105	15	Bhart Patti
57960	Shantipur Torwan	232105	15	Neerapur
57961	Silauta	232106	11	Silauta
57961	Silauta	232106	11	Mangalpur
57962	Sisaura Kala	232106	15	Sisaura Kala
57962	Sisaura Kala	232106	15	Sisaura Khurd
57963	Sonhuli	232105	11	Sonhuli
57963	Sonhuli	232105	11	Gang Barar Sonhuli
57964	Sraswatipur	232105	13	Nailipati Pashchim
57964	Sraswatipur	232105	13	Nailipatti Purba
57964	Sraswatipur	232105	13	Odhwa
57965	Tribhuwanpur	232105	13	Phoolpur Urf Prasadpur
57965	Tribhuwanpur	232105	13	Khar Kholi
57965	Tribhuwanpur	232105	13	Marai
57966	Vardisara	232108	13	Vardisara
57967	Vijayipur	232106	11	Nonari
57967	Vijayipur	232106	11	Kaudharpur
57968	Virana	232105	15	Virana
57969	Visunpur Kala	232108	11	Visunpur Kala
268240	Alamkhatopur	232105	11	Alamkhatopur
268255	Chilbili	232106	11	Chilbili
268267	Gajendrapur	232109	11	Gajendrpur
268296	Jivanpur	232106	11	Jivanpur
268297	Karjara	232106	11	Karjara
268309	Kisunpura	232107	11	Kisunpura
268330	Ramarepur	232108	11	Ramarepur
272436	Guraini	232108	11	Guraini
273725	Dodhiya	232106	11	Dodhiya
273734	Sangrampur	232107	11	Lakhipur
273734	Sangrampur	232107	11	Manni Patti
273735	Premasraya Pur	232108	13	Maharai
273735	Premasraya Pur			Gurehoo
273736	Ekbalpur	232106	11	Akabalpur
273738	Pandaypur Milki	232108	11	Pandeypuri Milki
273739	Math Uchhal Giri	232108	11	Math Ucharhhal Giri
273739	Math Uchhal Giri	232108	11	Shivadasipur
274096	Saraya	232105	11	Sarya
274096	Saraya	232105	11	Rasulpur
274160	Madhopur	232106	13	Madhopur
