= Obra Assembly constituency =

Obra Assembly constituency may refer to

- Obra, Bihar Assembly constituency
- Obra, Uttar Pradesh Assembly constituency
