= Jawahar Lal Jaiswal =

Indian politician

Member of the Indian Parliament for Chandauli
- In office 1999–2004
- Preceded by: Ananda Ratna Maurya
- Succeeded by: Kailash Nath Singh Yadav

Personal details
- Born: 30 July 1956 (age 70) Chhota Lalpur, Varanasi District, Uttar Pradesh
- Party: Samajwadi Party
- Profession: Politician

Jawahar Prasad Jaiswal is an Indian politician. He was elected to the Lok Sabha, the lower house of the Parliament of India from Chandauli, Uttar Pradesh in 1999 as a member of the Samajwadi Party. He is prominent figure in liquor trade in Uttar Pradesh. Popularly known as Liquor King.
