= Mahendra Nath Pandey =

Indian politician

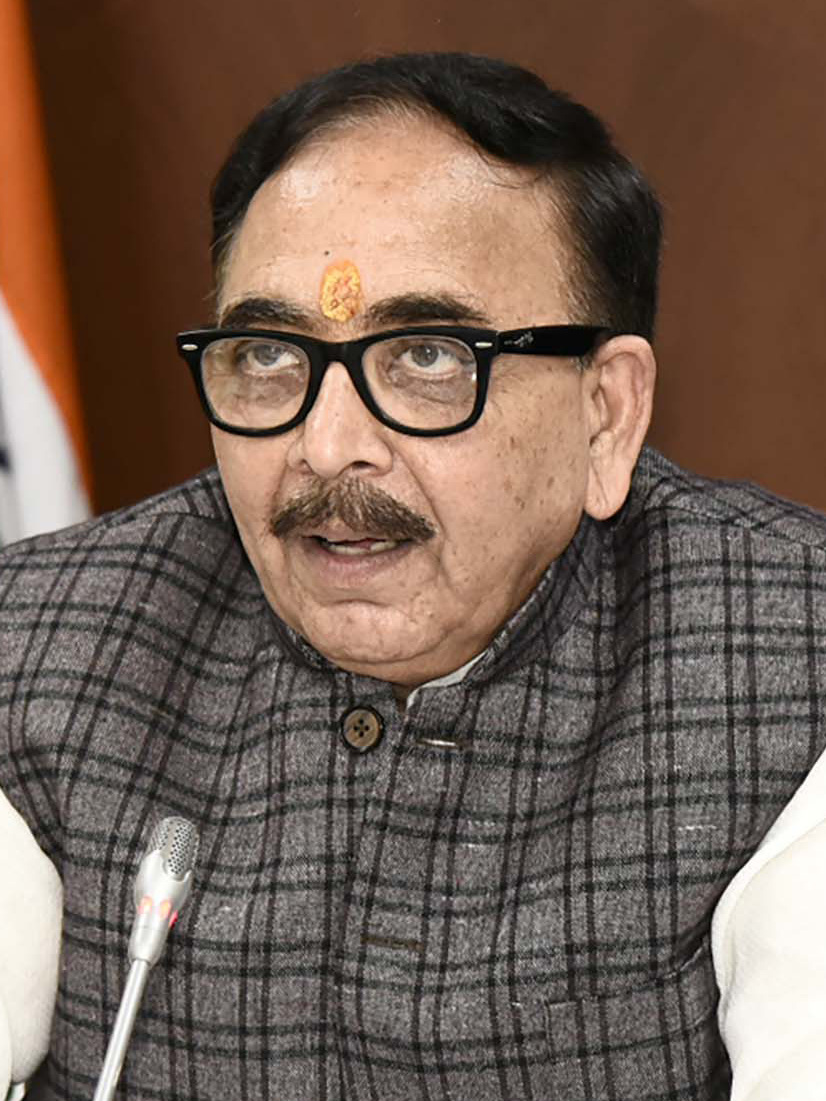
- Pandey in 2024

Minister of Heavy Industries
- In office 7 July 2021 – 11 June 2024
- Prime Minister: Narendra Modi
- Preceded by: Prakash Javadekar
- Succeeded by: H. D. Kumaraswamy

Minister of Skill Development and Entrepreneurship
- In office 31 May 2019 – 7 July 2021
- Prime Minister: Narendra Modi
- Preceded by: Dharmendra Pradhan
- Succeeded by: Dharmendra Pradhan

President of Bharatiya Janata Party, Uttar Pradesh unit
- In office 31 August 2017 – 16 July 2019
- Preceded by: Keshav Prasad Maurya
- Succeeded by: Swatantra Dev Singh

Minister of State, Human Resource Development
- In office 5 July 2016 – 31 August 2017
- Succeeded by: Satya Pal Singh

Member of Parliament, Lok Sabha
- In office 16 May 2014 – 4 June 2024
- Preceded by: Ramkishun
- Succeeded by: Virendra Singh
- Constituency: Chandauli

Personal details
- Born: 15 October 1957 (age 68) Pakhapur, Uttar Pradesh, India
- Party: Bharatiya Janata Party
- Spouse: Pratima Pandey (m.1985)
- Parents: Sudhakar Pandey (father); Chandrawati Pandey (mother)
- Education: Banaras Hindu University (M.A. and Ph.D)
- Profession: Agriculturist
- Cabinet: Second Modi ministry

Mahendra Nath Pandey (born 15 October 1957) is an Indian politician who was Minister of Heavy Industries and Minister for Skill Development and Entrepreneurship of India and Member of Lok Sabha for Chandauli from 2014 to 2024. He is a member of Bharatiya Janata Party and was the president of the party's Uttar Pradesh unit. He was also Union Minister of State for Ministry of Human Resource Development in 2016 and 2017. He was a member of Modi's second ministry. On 30 May 2019, he was appointed as Cabinet minister for Skill Development and Entrepreneurship, Government of India.

== Early life ==
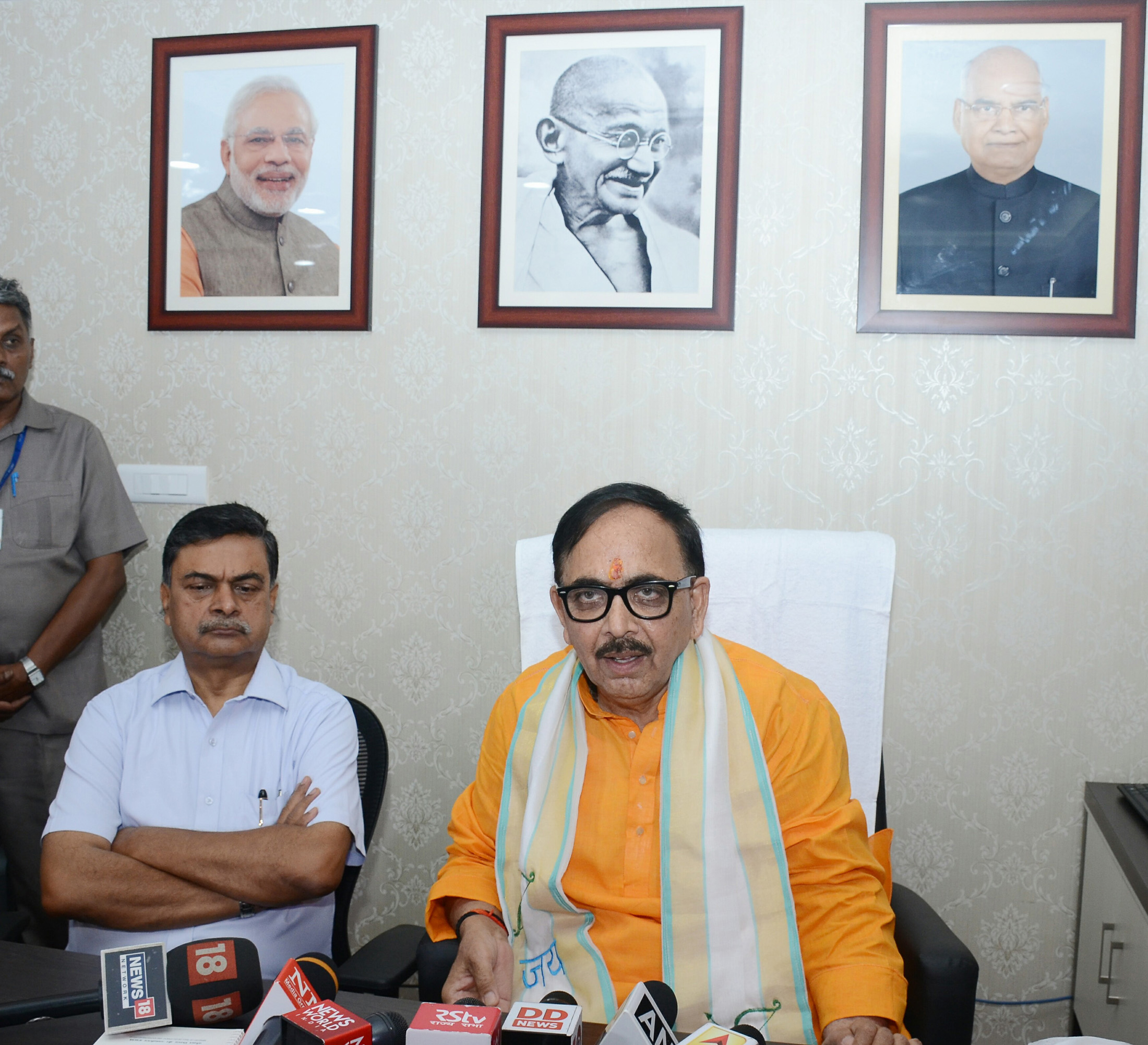
Dr. Mahendra Nath Pandey interacting with the media after taking charge as the Union Minister for Skill Development and Entrepreneurship, along with Shri Raj Kumar Singh, Minister of State for Skill Development and Entrepreneurship, in New Delhi on June 04, 2019.

Pandey was born at Pakhanpur, Uttar Pradesh to Sudhakar Pandey and Chandrawati Pandey in a Brahmin family. He received a postgraduate degree in Journalism and completed his Ph.D in Hindi from Banaras Hindu University. In 1973, he was elected president of the students' union of C.M. Anglo Bengali College. Five years later, he became the general secretary of the students' union of Banaras Hindu University.

Pandey spent five months in prison during the Emergency. In 1978, he joined Rashtriya Swayamsevak Sangh. He took part in the Ram Janmabhoomi movement and was booked under the National Security Act by the Mulayam Singh Yadav-led state government.

In 1991, Pandey was elected to the Uttar Pradesh Legislative Assembly for the first time. In 1996, he was re-elected to the assembly. He received the portfolio of Minister of State for Housing and Urban Development the following year in the Kalyan Singh ministry. He also served as Minister of State for Planning (Independent charge) between 1998 and 2000, and Minister of State, Panchayati Raj between 2000 and 2002.

Ahead of the 2014 Indian general election, Bharatiya Janata Party announced that Pandey would contest from the Chandauli constituency of Purvanchal. He was elected to the Lok Sabha after defeating his nearest rival Anil Maurya of the Bahujan Samaj Party by a margin of approximately 150,000 votes. Subsequently, he was made a member of Standing Committee on Rural Development and Consultative Committee for Ministry of Steel and Mines.

On 5 July 2016, in a major cabinet reshuffle, Pandey took the oath of office as Union Minister of State for Human Resource Development in the First Modi ministry. On 31 August 2017, he was replaced by Satyapal Singh. That same day, he was appointed president of the Uttar Pradesh unit of the BJP, replacing Keshav Prasad Maurya.

In the Cabinet announcement made on 31 May 2019, Pandey was given the post of Minister of Skill Development and Entrepreneurship in the 17th Lok Sabha under Prime Minister Narendra Modi.

== Personal life ==
Pandey's family originally hails from the village of Pakhanpur. He married Pratima Pandey on 8 February 1985 and they have one daughter.

Lok Sabha
Preceded by Ramkishun	Member of Parliament for Chandauli; 2014 – Present	Incumbent
Political offices
Preceded by Dharmendra Pradhan	Minister of Skill Development and Entrepreneurship; 30 May 2019 - 7 July 2021	Succeeded by Dharmendra Pradhan
Preceded by Prakash Javadekar	Minister of Heavy Industries; 7 July 2021 - Present	Incumbent
