= Ananda Ratna Maurya =

Indian politician

Member of Parliament, Lok Sabha
- In office 1991–1999
- Preceded by: Kailash Nath Singh Yadav
- Succeeded by: Jawahar Lal Jaiswal
- Constituency: Chandauli, Uttar Pradesh

Personal details
- Born: 7 July 1955 (age 70) Varanasi, Uttar Pradesh, India
- Died: 20 Jan 2023 Indirapuram, Uttar Pradesh
- Party: Samajwadi Party
- Other political affiliations: Bharatiya Janata Party
- Children: 2
- Profession: Politician

Ananda Ratna Maurya is an Indian politician. He was elected to the Lok Sabha, the lower house of the Parliament of India from Chandauli, Uttar Pradesh in 1991, 1996 and 1998 as a member of the Bharatiya Janata Party.Later he joined the Samajwadi Party and contested in 2004 election but lost to Kailash Nath Singh Yadav.

He rejoined BJP in 2007 and since then was working for party development. He was also a Uttar Pradesh BJP vice president since 2015 to 2017.

He resigned from BJP on 5 March 2019.
Anand Ratna Maurya known for constitutional & people's politics. People from chandauli loksabha constituency remember him as a gentle and a noble parliamentarian.

Apparently, Maurya was among the most educated politicians in Atal Bihari government's regime. He is an ardent poet too. His other interests include travelling and cooking. He was a nature lover and worked for protection of environment.
