= Sudhakar Pandey =

Indian politician

Member of Parliament, Lok Sabha
- In office 1971-1977
- Preceded by: Nihal Singh
- Succeeded by: Narsingh Yadav
- Constituency: Chandauli, Uttar Pradesh

Member of Parliament, Rajya Sabha
- In office 1980-1986
- Constituency: Uttar Pradesh

Personal details
- Born: 1 July 1927 Chaka, Varanasi, British India
- Died: 18 April 2003 (aged 75)
- Party: Indian National Congress

Sudhakar Pandey (1927-2003) was an Indian politician. He was elected to the Lok Sabha, the lower house of the Parliament of India from Chandauli, Uttar Pradesh in 1971 as a member of the Indian National Congress. He was a member of the Rajya Sabha, the Upper house of the Parliament of India from Uttar Pradesh from 1980 to 1986.
