= Chandra Tripathi =

Indian politician (1931–1989)

Member of Parliament, Lok Sabha
- In office 1984–1989
- Preceded by: Nihal Singh
- Succeeded by: Kailash Nath Singh Yadav
- Constituency: Chandauli, Uttar Pradesh

Personal details
- Born: 26 October 1931 Aligarh, United Provinces, British India(present-day Uttar Pradesh, India)
- Died: 7 September 1989 (aged 57) Varanasi, India
- Party: Indian National Congress
- Spouse: Lokapati Tripathi
- Children: 1 son and 2 daughters

Chandra Tripathi (26 October 1931 – 7 September 1989) was an Indian politician. She was elected to the Lok Sabha, the lower house of the Parliament of India from Chandauli, Uttar Pradesh in 1984 as a member of the Indian National Congress. Tripathi died in Varanasi on 7 September 1989, at the age of 57.
