= Sunil Kumar Singh Yadav =

Indian politician

Member of Uttar Pradesh Legislative Assembly
- In office 12 March 2012 – 10 March 2017
- Constituency: Obra

Personal details
- Born: 16 August 1981 (age 45) Anpara, Robertsganj, Uttar Pradesh
- Party: Samajwadi party
- Other political affiliations: BSP
- Education: University of Allahabad
- Profession: Politician

Sunil Singh Yadav (born August 16, 1981) is an Indian politician who has been Member of legislative assembly from Obra, Robertsganj –Uttar Pradesh since 2012. A member of the Samajwadi party, he was elected as an Uttar Pradesh Member Of Legislative Assembly 2012.

== Early life and education ==
Sunil Kumar Singh Yadav was born to Kailash Nath Singh Yadav and Kumari Devi on 16 August 1981 in Parasi Village-Anpara, Sonbhadra district, Uttar Pradesh. He studied primary Education in Urmila Public School Anpra and subsequently was awarded a degree in Political Science while studying in Allahabad University.

== Political career ==
Sunil Singh Yadav's father Kailash Nath Singh Yadav was the Member Of parliament from Chandauli and also was the cabinet Minister in Uttar Pradesh Mayawati government.

Sunil Inspired by BSP founder Kanshiram and his colleague Mayawati and subsequently his father Kailash Nath Yadav.

But in 2021 Sunil Singh Yadav and father Kailash nath singh yadav both joined Samajwadi party .

Earlier father Kailash nath singh yadav was in Samajwadi party and helped in making foundation of party.
