= Virendra Singh (Varanasi) =

Indian politician

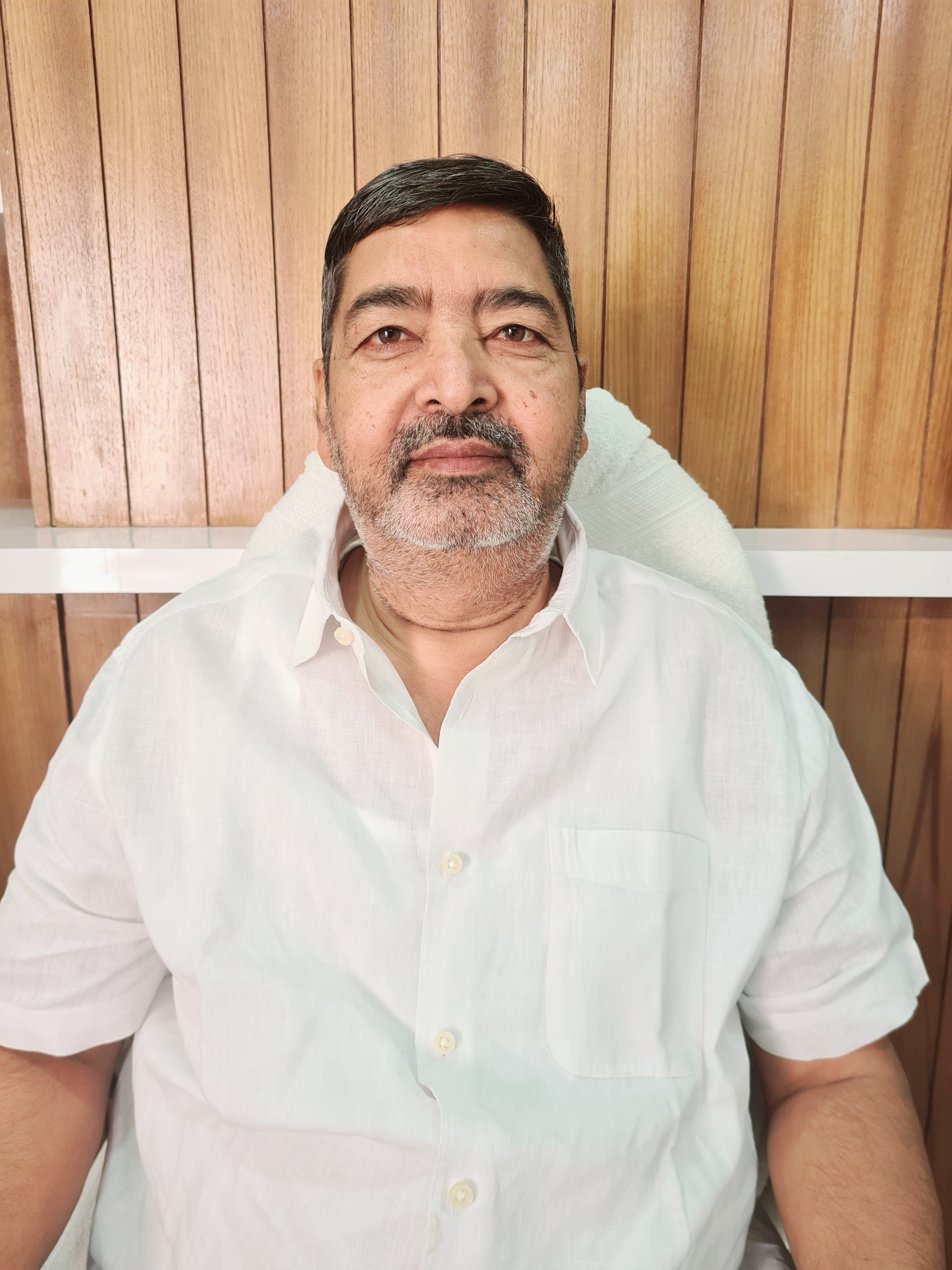

Member of Parliament, Lok Sabha
- Incumbent
- Assumed office 4 June 2024
- Preceded by: Mahendra Nath Pandey
- Constituency: Chandauli

Member of Uttar Pradesh Legislative Assembly
- In office 1996–2002
- Preceded by: Maya Shankar Pathak
- Succeeded by: Ramjit Rajbhar
- Constituency: Chiraigaon
- In office 2003–2007
- Preceded by: Ramjit Rajbhar
- Succeeded by: Udai Lal Maurya
- Constituency: Chiraigaon

Personal details
- Education: Udai Pratap Autonomous College, Varanasi (B.Sc); Benaras Hindu University (M.Sc)

Virendra Singh (also spelled Birendra Singh) is an Indian politician and a member of the Samajwadi Party. He is the current Member of Parliament, Lok Sabha from the Chandauli constituency in Uttar Pradesh.

== Early life and education ==
He obtained his B.Sc. degree from Udai Pratap Autonomous College, Varanasi. He completed his M.Sc. from Banaras Hindu University.

== Political career ==
Earlier, he was a member of the Uttar Pradesh Legislative Assembly, elected from the Chiraigaon constituency for two terms: 1996–2002 and 2003–2007. Over his career, he has been affiliated with multiple political parties, including the Indian National Congress and the Bahujan Samaj Party, before joining the Samajwadi Party. In 2024, he contested the Lok Sabha elections from Chandauli and won, becoming Member of Parliament. He also serves as a national spokesperson for the Samajwadi Party.

== Parliamentary performance ==
In the 18th Lok Sabha, he has been actively participating in debates and raising issues pertaining to his constituency and national matters. His attendance record is noted to be high.

== Residence and contact ==
He resides in Tagore Town, Orderly Bazar, Varanasi district. His email and contact details are publicly listed in the Lok Sabha member’s directory.
