= Annapurna Singh =

Indian politician

Member of Uttar Pradesh Legislative Council
- Incumbent
- Assumed office 12 April 2022
- Preceded by: Brijesh Singh alias Arun
- Constituency: Varanasi Local Authorities
- In office 16 January 2010 – 15 January 2016
- Preceded by: Uday Nath alias Chulbul Singh
- Succeeded by: Brijesh Singh alias Arun
- Constituency: Varanasi Local Authorities

Personal details
- Born: 1974 (age 51–52) Zamania, Ghazipur; Uttar Pradesh, India
- Party: Independent
- Other political affiliations: Bahujan Samaj Party (2010-2016)
- Spouse: Brijesh Singh alias Arun (m.1991)
- Relations: Sushil Singh (nephew)
- Profession: Politician
- Nickname: Poonam

Annapurna Singh (also known as Poonam) (born 1974) is a politician who is a Member of Uttar Pradesh legislative council as an Independent candidate.

== Personal life ==
She was born in 1974 in Zamania district Ghazipur. She is youngest child of her parents among 5 siblings and married to Mafia-turned politician Brijesh Singh alias Arun (ex-MLC) in 1991. They both have 2 sons and 1 daughter. Her nephew is also a politician and MLA of BJP Sushil Singh.

== Political career ==
Annapurna Singh started her political career from BSP and contested MLC election in 2010 on BSP ticket from Varanasi local authorities and won with heavy margin. Her husband succeeded her as an Independent candidate in 2016 MLC election. In 2022 she again contested MLC election as Independent candidate and won. Her husband and elder brother were also MLCs from same seat as BJP candidates (from 1998-2010).
