= Bal Krishna Singh =

Indian politician (1916–1977)

Member of Parliament, Lok Sabha
- In office 1962–1967
- Preceded by: Prabhu Narain Singh
- Succeeded by: Nihal Singh
- Constituency: Chandauli, Uttar Pradesh

Personal details
- Born: 18 April 1916 Akorha Kalan, P.O. Baburi, Varanasi district, United Provinces of Agra and Oudh, British India
- Died: 1977 (aged 60–61)
- Party: Indian National Congress
- Spouse: F. J. Devi
- Children: Two sons and Two daughters

Bal Krishna Singh (18 April 1916 – 1977) was an Indian politician. He was elected to the Lok Sabha, lower house of the Parliament of India from Chandauli, Uttar Pradesh in 1962 as a member of the Indian National Congress.

Singh died in 1977.
