= Uday Lal Maurya =

Indian politician

Uday Lal Maurya उदय लाल मौर्या

MLA, 16th Legislative Assembly of Uttar Pradesh
- In office March 2012 – March 2017
- Preceded by: None
- Succeeded by: Anil Rajbhar
- Constituency: Shivpur

MLA, 15th Legislative Assembly of Uttar Pradesh
- In office May 2007 – March 2012
- Preceded by: Ramjit Rajbhar
- Succeeded by: None
- Constituency: Chiraigaon

Personal details
- Born: 8 July 1958 (age 67) Varanasi
- Party: Ex BJP, Current Samajwadi Party
- Parent: Shri Ram Maurya (father)
- Profession: Agriculturist & Politician

Uday Lal Maurya (Hindi: उदय लाल मौर्या) is an Indian politician and a member of the 16th Legislative Assembly of Uttar Pradesh from BJP of India. He represents the Shivpur constituency of Uttar Pradesh and is a member of the Samajwadi party.

== Early life and education ==
Uday Lal Maurya was born in Varanasi in 1958. He holds a Bachelor's degree. Prior to entering politics, he was an agriculturist by profession.

== Political career ==
Uday Lal Maurya has been MLA for two terms. Maurya represents Shivpur constituency and is a member of the Samajwadi party. During his previous term, he represented "Chiraigaon assembly constituency" (constituency ceased to exist in 2008 after "Delimitation of Parliamentary and Assembly Constituencies Order, 2008" was passed).

== Posts Held ==
#	From	To	Position	Constituency
01	May 2007	March 2012	Member, 15th Legislative Assembly	Chiraigaon
02	March 2012	March 2017	Member, 16th Legislative Assembly	Shivpur

== See also ==
- Government of India
- Politics of India
- Uttar Pradesh Legislative Assembly
- Shivpur
