= Obra, Uttar Pradesh Assembly constituency =

Constituency of the Uttar Pradesh legislative assembly in India

Coordinates: 24.46°N 82.99°E

Obra
- Constituency No. 402 for the Uttar Pradesh Legislative Assembly

Constituency details
- Country: India
- Region: North India
- State: Uttar Pradesh
- District: Sonbhadra
- Total electors: 3,27,556
- Reservation: ST

Member of Legislative Assembly
- 18th Uttar Pradesh Legislative Assembly
- Incumbent Sanjiv Kumar
- Party: Bharatiya Janta Party
- Elected year: 2017

Obra is a constituency of the Uttar Pradesh Legislative Assembly covering the city of Obra in the Sonbhadra district of Uttar Pradesh, India.

Obra is one of five assembly constituencies in the Robertsganj Lok Sabha constituency and is reserved for candidates of the Scheduled Tribes.

== Members of the Legislative Assembly ==
Year	Member	Party
Till 2012 : Constituency did not exist
2012	Sunil Kumar Singh Yadav	Bahujan Samaj Party
2017	Sanjiv Kumar Gond	Bharatiya Janata Party
2022	Sanjiv Kumar Gond	Bharatiya Janata Party

== Election results ==
=== 2027 ===
2027 Uttar Pradesh Legislative Assembly election: Obra
Party	Candidate	Votes	%	±%
BJP				
INC				
BSP				
NOTA	None of the above			
Majority				
Turnout				
gain from		Swing		

=== 2022 ===
2022 Uttar Pradesh Legislative Assembly election: Obra
Party	Candidate	Votes	%	±%
BJP	Sanjeev Kumar Gond	78,364	48.04	+0.11
SP	Arvind Kumar Alias Sunil Singh Gond	51,922	31.83	+11.08
BSP	Subhash Kharwar	20,131	12.34	−5.54
INC	Ramraj	4,519	2.77	
VIP	Umashankar	2,184	1.34	
NOTA	None of the above	3,077	1.89	−0.83
Majority		26,442	16.21	−10.97
Turnout		163,139	49.8	−3.1
BJP hold		Swing		

=== 2017 ===
Bharatiya Janta Party candidate Sanjiv Kumar won in 2017 Uttar Pradesh Legislative Elections defeating Samajwadi Party candidate Ravi Gond by a margin of 44,269 votes.

2017 Uttar Pradesh Legislative Assembly Election: Obr
Party	Candidate	Votes	%	±%
BJP	Sanjiv Kumar Gond	78,058	47.93	
SP	Ravi Gond	33,789	20.75	
BSP	Virendra Pratap Singh	29,113	17.88	
Independent	Subhash Kharvar	6,198	3.81	
CPI	Bahadur Ram Panika	3,272	2.01	
NISHAD	Jagdeesh Baiga	1,825	1.12	
Independent	Ram Surat	1,709	1.05	
All India Peoples' Front (Radical)	Kripa Shankar	1,631	1.0	
NOTA	None of the above	4,305	2.72	
Majority		44,269	27.18	
Turnout		162,843	52.9	
