= Saiyadraja Assembly constituency =

Constituency of the Uttar Pradesh legislative assembly in India

Coordinates: 25.25°N 83.35°E

Saiyadraja
- Constituency No. 382 for the Uttar Pradesh Legislative Assembly

Constituency details
- Country: India
- Region: North India
- State: Uttar Pradesh
- District: Chandauli
- Total electors: 3,33,280
- Reservation: None

Member of Legislative Assembly
- 18th Uttar Pradesh Legislative Assembly
- Incumbent Sushil Singh
- Party: Bharatiya Janta Party
- Elected year: 2017

Saiyadraja is a constituency of the Uttar Pradesh Legislative Assembly covering the city of Saiyadraja in the Chandauli district of Uttar Pradesh, India. Saiyadraja is one of five assembly constituencies in the Chandauli Lok Sabha constituency. Since 2008, this assembly constituency is numbered 382 among 403 constituencies of the Uttar Pradesh Legislative Assembly.

== Members of the Legislative Assembly ==
Election	Name	Party
Till 2012 : Constituency did not exist
2012	Manoj Kumar	Independent politician
2017	Sushil Singh	Bharatiya Janata Party
2022	Sushil Singh	Bharatiya Janata Party

== Election results ==
=== 2027 ===
2027 Uttar Pradesh Legislative Assembly election: Saiyadraja
Party	Candidate	Votes	%	±%
INDIA				
NDA				
BSP				
NOTA	None of the above			
Majority				
Turnout				
gain from		Swing		

=== 2022 ===
2022 Uttar Pradesh Legislative Assembly election: Saiyadraja
Party	Candidate	Votes	%	±%
BJP	Sushil Singh	87,891	41.85	▲1.96
SP	Manoj Kumar Singh	76,974	36.65	▲13.98
BSP	Amit Kumar Yadav	36,848	17.54	▼15.02
INC	Vimla	2,155	1.03	
NOTA	None of the above	1,647	0.78	▲0.04
Majority		10,917	5.2	▼2.13
Turnout		210,031	63.02	▲0.74
BJP hold		Swing		

=== 2017 ===
2017 Uttar Pradesh Legislative Assembly election: Saiyadraja
Party	Candidate	Votes	%	±%
BJP	Sushil Singh	78,869	39.89	
BSP	Shyam Narayan Singh	64,375	32.56	
SP	Manoj Kumar Singh	44,832	22.67	
NOTA	None of the above	1,460	0.74	
Majority		14,494	7.33	
Turnout		197,724	62.28	
BJP gain from Independent		Swing		
