= Anil Rajbhar =

Indian politician (born 1973)

Minister of Labour & Employment, Government of Uttar Pradesh
- Incumbent
- Assumed office 25 March 2022
- Chief Minister: Yogi Adityanath
- Preceded by: Swami Prasad Maurya

Minister of Backward Class Welfare & Disabled Empowerment, Government of Uttar Pradesh
- In office 21 August 2019 – 25 March 2022
- Chief Minister: Yogi Adityanath
- Preceded by: Om Prakash Rajbhar
- Succeeded by: Narendra Kumar Kashyap

Minister of Sainik Welfare, Homeguards, Prantiya Rakshak Dal & Civil Security Government of Uttar Pradesh
- In office 19 March 2017 – 21 August 2019
- Chief Minister: Yogi Adityanath
- Succeeded by: Chetan Chauhan

Member of Uttar Pradesh Legislative Assembly
- Incumbent
- Assumed office 19 March 2017
- Preceded by: Uday Lal Maurya
- Constituency: Shivpur

Personal details
- Born: 5 February 1973 (age 53) Bombay, Maharashtra, India (present-day Mumbai)
- Party: Bharatiya Janata Party
- Other political affiliations: Samajwadi Party
- Spouse: Usha Rajbhar (m. 1997)
- Children: 3
- Parent: Ramjeet Rajbhar (father)
- Profession: Politician

Anil Rajbhar (born 5 February 1973) is an Indian politician and a cabinet minister in the Government of Uttar Pradesh. Currently, he is additional minister in-charge of district Ballia and Bahraich. He belongs to Tehsil Sakaldiha District Chandauli. He has started his political journey as the president of the Sakaldiha Degree College after that he joined Samajwadi Party (SP).

== Political career ==
Anil Rajbhar got the ministries of Pichhda Karg kalyan and Divyang Jan.
