= Saiyad Raja =

- Town
- Location in Uttar Pradesh, India Saiyad Raja (India)
- Coordinates: 25°15′N 83°21′E
- Country: India
- State: Uttar Pradesh
- District: Chandauli

Population (2001)
  - Total: 15,695

Languages
  - Official: Hindi
- Time zone: UTC+5:30 (IST)
- Postal code: 232110
- Vehicle registration: UP
- Website: up.gov.in

Saiyad Raja is a town and a nagar panchayat in Chandauli district in the Indian state of Uttar Pradesh. It is 12 km from the district headquarters at Chandauli. This town also happens to be the last town on U.P Bihar G.T Road border. National Highway 97 terminates at Saiyadraja. The nearest airport is Varanasi Airport.

== Demographics ==
As of the 2001 India census, Saiyad Shahid Raja had a population of 15,695. Males constitute 52% of the population and females 48%. Saiyad Raja has an average literacy rate of 56%, lower than the national average of 59.5%: male literacy is 64%, and female literacy is 47%. In Saiyad Raja, 18% of the population is under 6 years of age.
