= Prabhunarayan Yadav =

Indian politician

MLA, 17th Legislative Assembly
- Incumbent
- Assumed office 2017
- Constituency: Sakaldiha, Chandauli, Uttar Pradesh

Personal details
- Party: Samajwadi Party
- Education: Gorakhpur University
- Occupation: MLA
- Profession: Politician

Prabhunarayan Yadav is an Indian politician and a member of 17th Legislative Assembly, Uttar Pradesh of India. He represents the Sakaldiha constituency in Chandauli district of Uttar Pradesh.

== Political career ==
Prabhunarayan Yadav contested Uttar Pradesh Assembly Election as Samajwadi Party candidate and defeated his close contestant Suryamuni Tiwari from Bhartiya Janata Party with a margin of 14,696 votes.

== Posts held ==
#	From	To	Position	Comments
01	2017	Incumbent	Member, 17th Legislative Assembly	

== See also ==
- Uttar Pradesh Legislative Assembly
