= Sakaldiha Assembly constituency =

Constituency of the Uttar Pradesh legislative assembly in India

Sakaldiha
- Constituency No. 381 for the Uttar Pradesh Legislative Assembly

Constituency details
- Country: India
- Region: North India
- State: Uttar Pradesh
- District: Chandauli
- Total electors: 2,94,992 (2012)
- Reservation: None

Member of Legislative Assembly
- 18th Uttar Pradesh Legislative Assembly
- Incumbent Prabhunarayan Yadav
- Party: Samajwadi Party
- Elected year: 2022

Sakaldiha Assembly constituency is one of the 403 constituencies of the Uttar Pradesh Legislative Assembly, India. It is a part of the Chandauli district and one of the four assembly constituencies in the Chandauli Lok Sabha constituency. First election in this assembly constituency was held in 2008 after constituency came into existence when "Delimitation of Parliamentary and Assembly Constituencies Order, 2008" was passed in the year 2008.

== Wards and areas ==
Extent of Sakaldiha Assembly constituency is 1-Chahania North, 2-Chahania South, 3-Sakaldiha, PCs 72- Amaval, 74-Paura, 75-Pithapur, 79-Dharahara, 80-Ranepur & 95- Salempur of 4-Dhanapur KC of 1-Sakaldiha Tehsil.

== Members of Legislative Assembly ==
Year	Member	Party
Till 2012 : Constituency did not exist
2012	Sushil Singh	Independent
2017	Prabhunarayan Yadav	Samajwadi Party
2022	Prabhunarayan Yadav	Samajwadi Party

== Election results ==
=== 2027 ===
2027 Uttar Pradesh Legislative Assembly election: Sakaldiha
Party	Candidate	Votes	%	±%
INDIA				
NDA				
BSP				
NOTA	None of the above			
Majority				
Turnout				
gain from		Swing		

=== 2022 ===
2022 Uttar Pradesh Legislative Assembly election: Sakaldiha
Party	Candidate	Votes	%	±%
SP	Prabhunarayan Yadav	86,328	40.7	+1.23
BJP	Suryamuni Tiwari	69,667	32.84	+0.77
BSP	Jayshyam	43,756	20.63	−5.15
INC	Devendra Pratap Singh	5,135	2.42	
Jan Adhikar Party	Chanda	3,527	1.66	
NOTA	None of the above	1,569	0.74	−0.15
Majority		16,661	7.86	+0.46
Turnout		212,118	63.16	−0.53
SP hold		Swing		

=== 2017 ===
2017 Uttar Pradesh Legislative Assembly Election: Sakaldiha
Party	Candidate	Votes	%	±%
SP	Prabhunarayan Yadav	79,875	39.47	
BJP	Suryamuni Tiwari	64,906	32.07	
BSP	Upendra	52,175	25.78	
NOTA	None of the above	1,787	0.89	
Majority		14,969	7.4	
Turnout		202,392	63.69	

== See also ==
- Chandauli Lok Sabha constituency
