= Ramkishun =

Indian politician

- Born: 3 August 1956 (age 69); Bauri, Chandauli, (Uttar Pradesh).
- Citizenship: Indian
- Education: BA and BEd.
- Alma mater: Gorakhpur University
- Occupations: Politician, agriculturist, businessman.
- Years active: 2002 – present
- Political party: Samajwadi Party (SP).
- Spouse: Mrs. Premlata Yadav.
- Children: 3 (One son and two daughters)
- Parent(s): Ganji Prasad (father) and Shakuntala Devi (mother).

Ramkishun (born 3 August 1956) is an Indian politician who was a member of the 15th Lok Sabha of India. He represented the Chandauli constituency of Uttar Pradesh as a member of the Samajwadi Party (SP).

== Education and background ==
Ramkishun has Bachelor of Arts

== Posts held ==
#	From	To	Position
01	2002	2009	Member, Uttar Pradesh Legislative Assembly (two terms)
02	2009	–	Elected to 15th Lok Sabha
03	31 August 2009	–	Member, Committee on Labour
04	31 August 2009	–	Member, Consultative Committee, Ministry of Power

== See also ==
- List of members of the 15th Lok Sabha of India
