= Romanticism =

Artistic and intellectual movement

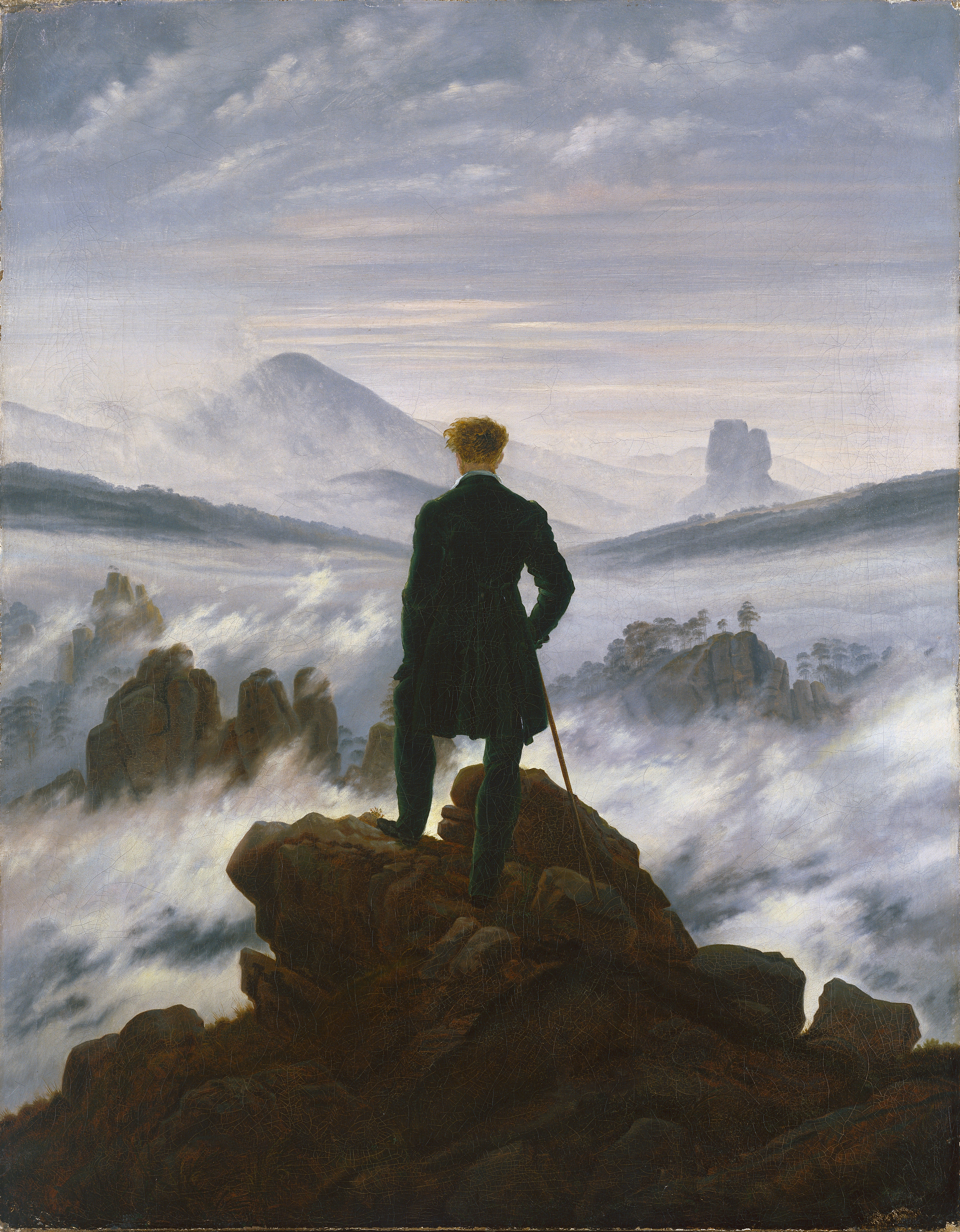
Caspar David Friedrich, Wanderer above the Sea of Fog, 1818

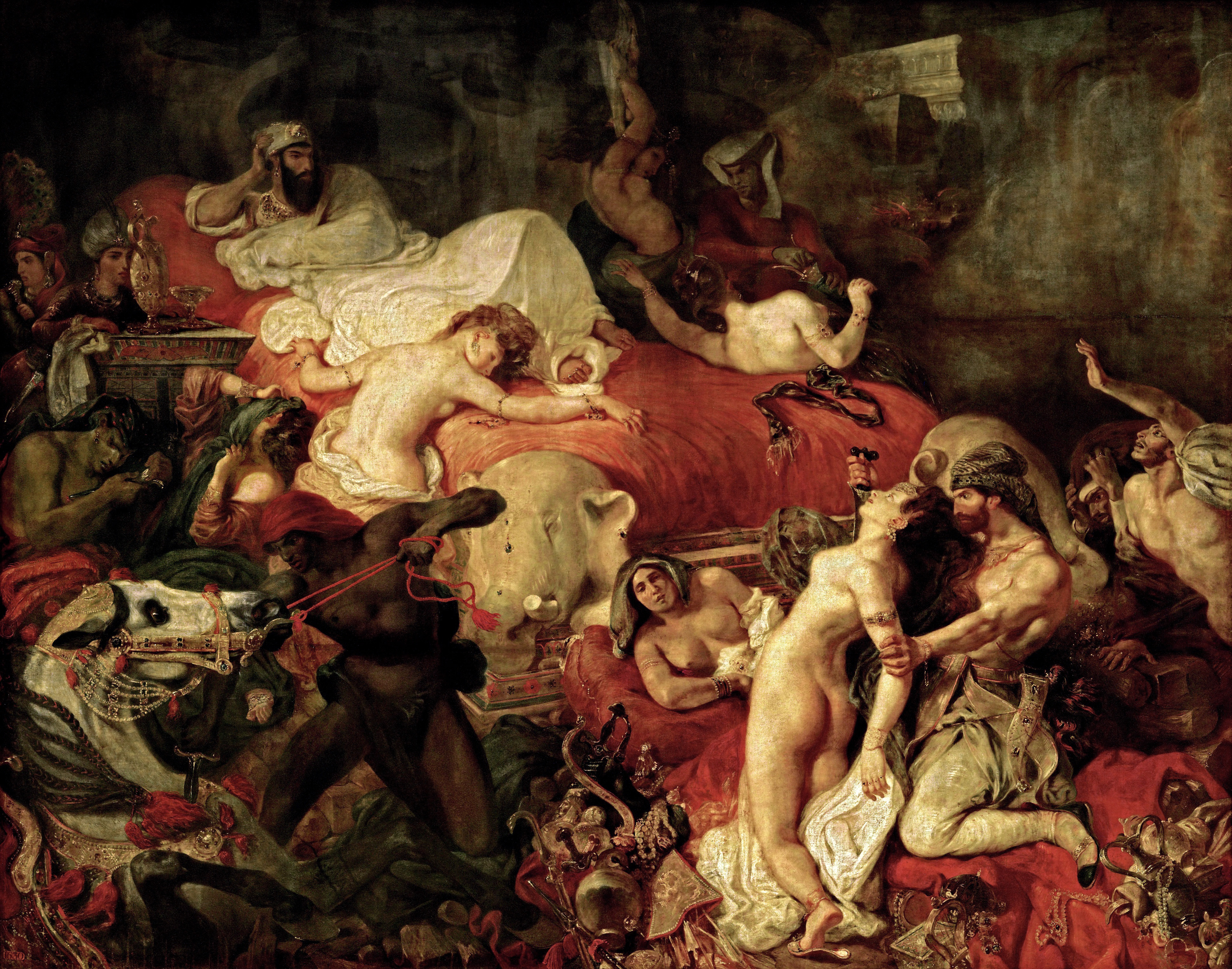
Eugène Delacroix, Death of Sardanapalus, 1827, taking its Orientalist subject from a play by Lord Byron

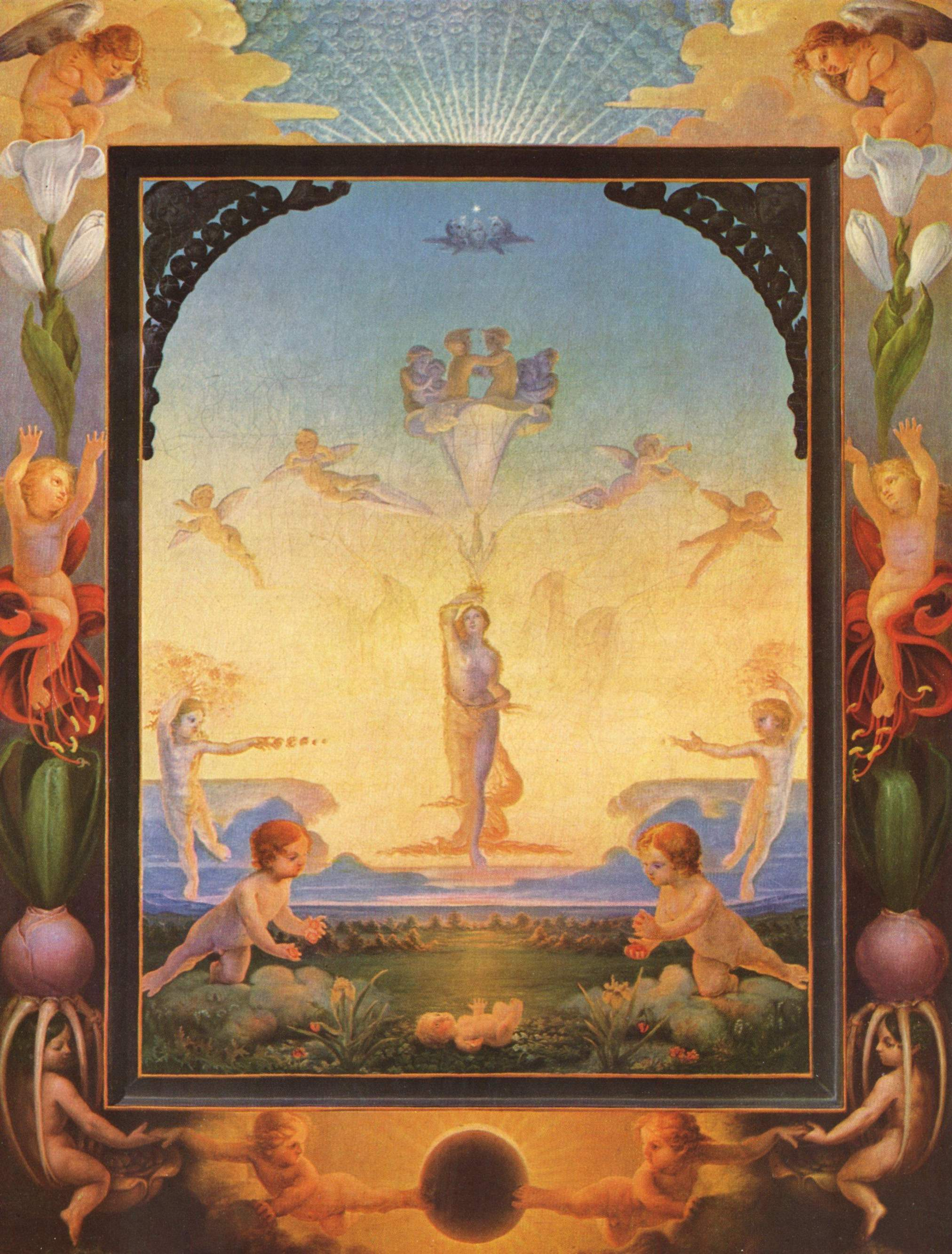
Philipp Otto Runge, The Morning, 1808

Romanticism (also known as the Romantic movement or Romantic era) was an artistic and intellectual movement that originated in Europe towards the end of the 18th century. The purpose of the movement was to advocate for the importance of subjectivity, imagination, and appreciation of nature in society and culture in response to the Age of Enlightenment and the Industrial Revolution.

Romanticists rejected the social conventions of the time in favour of a moral outlook known as individualism. They argued that passion and intuition were crucial to understanding the world, and that beauty is more than merely an affair of form, but rather something that evokes a strong emotional response. With this philosophical foundation, the Romanticists elevated several key themes to which they were deeply committed: a reverence for nature and the supernatural, an idealization of the past as a nobler era, a fascination with the exotic and the mysterious, and a celebration of the heroic and the sublime.

The Romanticist movement had a particular fondness for the Middle Ages, which to them represented an era of chivalry, heroism, and a more organic relationship between humans and their environment. This idealization contrasted sharply with the values of their contemporary industrial society, which they considered alienating for its economic materialism and environmental degradation. The movement's illustration of the Middle Ages was a central theme in debates, with allegations that Romanticist portrayals often overlooked the downsides of medieval life.

The consensus is that Romanticism peaked from 1800 until 1850. However, a "Late Romantic" period and "Neoromantic" revivals are also discussed. These extensions of the movement are characterized by a resistance to the increasingly experimental and abstract forms that culminated in modern art, and the deconstruction of traditional tonal harmony in music. They continued the Romantic ideal, stressing depth of emotion in art and music while showcasing technical mastery in a mature Romantic style. By the time of World War I, though, the cultural and artistic climate had changed to such a degree that Romanticism essentially dispersed into subsequent movements. Final Late Romanticist figures to maintain the Romantic ideals (i.e. Rachmaninoff) died in the 1940s. Though they were still widely respected, they were seen as anachronisms at that point.

Romanticism was a complex movement with a variety of viewpoints that permeated Western civilization across the globe. The movement and its opposing ideologies mutually shaped each other over time. After its end, Romantic thought and art exerted a sweeping influence on art and music, speculative fiction, philosophy, politics, and environmentalism that has endured to the present day, although the modern notion of "romanticization" and the act of "romanticizing" something often has little to do with the historical movement.

== Overview ==
=== Timeline ===
For most of the Western world, Romanticism was at its peak from approximately 1800 to 1850. The first Romantic ideas arose from an earlier German Counter-Enlightenment movement called Sturm und Drang (German: "Storm and Stress"). This movement directly criticized the Enlightenment's position that humans can fully comprehend the world through rationality alone, suggesting that intuition and emotion are key components of insight and understanding. Published in 1774, The Sorrows of Young Werther by Johann Wolfgang von Goethe began to shape the Romanticist movement and its ideals. The events and ideologies of the French Revolution were also direct influences on the movement; many early Romantics throughout Europe sympathized with the ideals and achievements of French revolutionaries.

A confluence of circumstances led to Romanticism's decline in the mid-19th century, including (but not limited to) the rise of Realism and Naturalism, Charles Darwin's publishing of the On the Origin of Species, the transition from widespread revolution in Europe to a more conservative climate, and a shift in public consciousness to the immediate impact of technology and urbanization on the working class. By World War I, Romanticism was overshadowed by new cultural, social, and political movements, many of them hostile to the perceived illusions and preoccupations of the Romantics.

However, Romanticism has had a lasting impact on Western civilization, and many works of art, music, and literature that embody the Romantic ideals have been made after the end of the Romantic era. The movement's advocacy for nature appreciation is cited as an influence for current nature conservation efforts. The majority of film scores from the Golden Age of Hollywood were written in the lush orchestral Romantic style, and this genre of orchestral cinematic music is still often seen in films of the 21st century. The philosophical underpinnings of the movement have influenced modern political theory, both among liberals and conservatives.

=== Purpose ===
Romanticism was characterized by its emphasis on emotion and individualism as well as the glorification of the past and nature, preferring the medieval over the classical. Romanticism was partly a reaction to the Industrial Revolution, and the prevailing ideology of the Age of Enlightenment, especially the scientific rationalization of Nature.

The movement's ideals were embodied most strongly in the visual arts, music, and literature; it also had an impact on historiography, education, chess, and the social sciences.

Romanticism had a significant and complex effect on politics: Romantic thinking influenced conservatism, liberalism, radicalism, and nationalism.

Romanticism prioritized the artist's unique, individual imagination above the strictures of classical form. The movement emphasized intense emotion as an authentic source of aesthetic experience. It granted a new importance to experiences of sympathy, awe, wonder, and terror, in part by naturalizing such emotions as responses to the "beautiful" and the "sublime".

Romantics stressed the nobility of folk art and ancient cultural practices, but also championed radical politics, unconventional behavior, and authentic spontaneity. In contrast to the rationalism and classicism of the Enlightenment, Romanticism revived medievalism and juxtaposed a pastoral conception of a more "authentic" European past with a highly critical view of recent social changes, including urbanization, brought about by the Industrial Revolution. Romanticism lionized the achievements of "heroic" individuals—especially artists, who began to be represented as cultural leaders (one Romantic luminary, Percy Bysshe Shelley, described poets as the "unacknowledged legislators of the world" in his "Defence of Poetry").

== Defining Romanticism ==
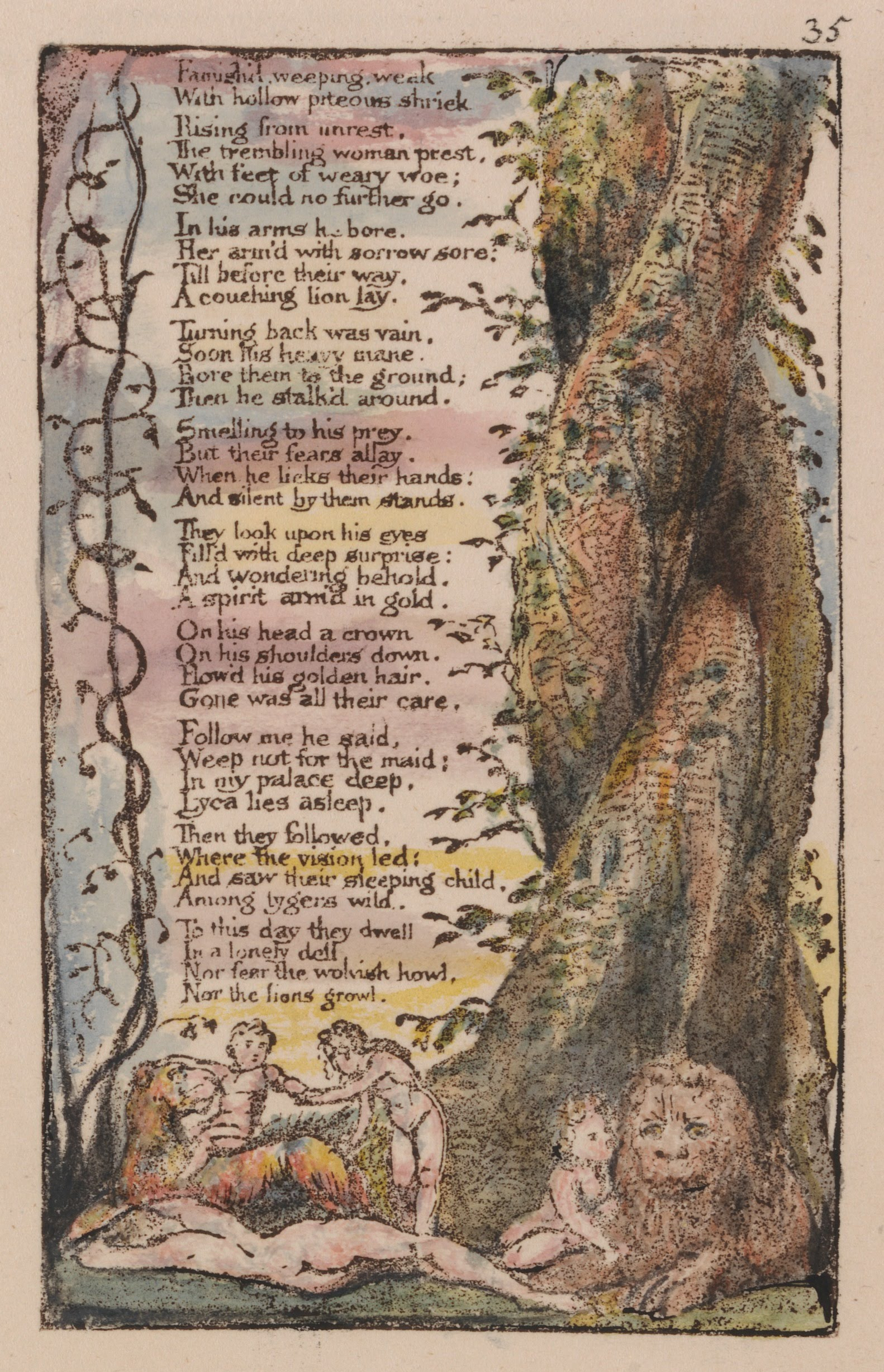
William Blake, The Little Girl Found, from Songs of Innocence and Experience, 1794

=== Basic characteristics ===
Romanticism placed the highest importance on the freedom of the artists to authentically express their sentiments and ideas. Romantics like the German painter Caspar David Friedrich believed that an artist's emotions should dictate their formal approach; Friedrich went as far as declaring that "the artist's feeling is his law". The Romantic poet William Wordsworth, thinking along similar lines, wrote that poetry should begin with "the spontaneous overflow of powerful feelings", which the poet then "recollect[s] in tranquility", enabling the poet to find a suitably unique form for representing such feelings.

The Romantics never doubted that emotionally motivated art would find suitable, harmonious modes for expressing its vital content—if, that is, the artist steered clear of moribund conventions and distracting precedents. Samuel Taylor Coleridge and others thought there were natural laws the imagination of born artists followed instinctively when these individuals were, so to speak, "left alone" during the creative process. These "natural laws" could support a wide range of different formal approaches: as many, perhaps, as there were individuals making personally meaningful works of art. Many Romantics believed that works of artistic genius were created "ex nihilo", "from nothing", without recourse to existing models. This idea is often called "romantic originality". The translator and prominent Romantic August Wilhelm Schlegel argued in his Lectures on Dramatic Arts and Letters that the most valuable quality of human nature is its tendency to diverge and diversify.

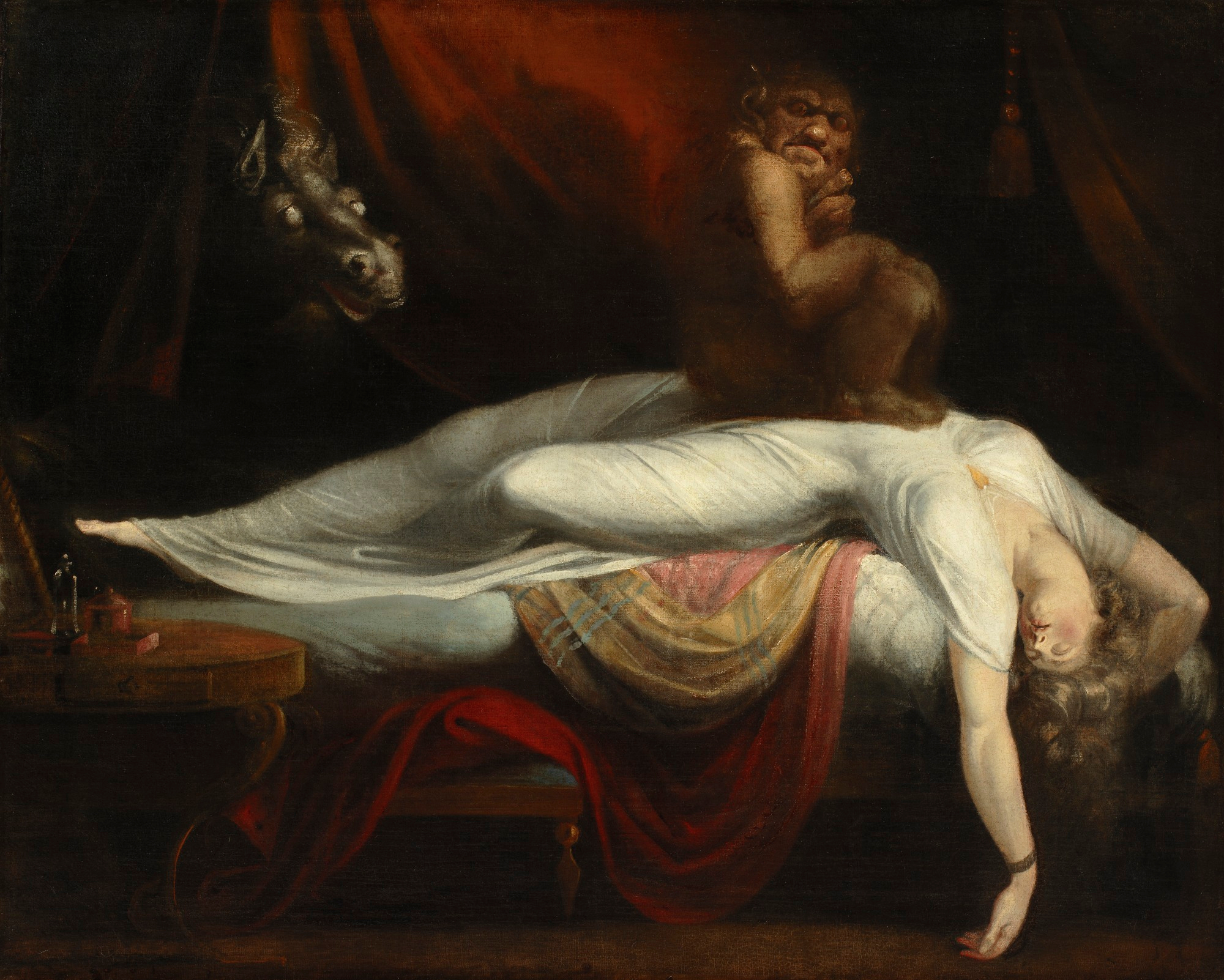
John Henry Fuseli, The Nightmare (1781), oil on canvas, 101.6 cm × 127 cm., Detroit Institute of Arts

According to Isaiah Berlin, Romanticism embodied "a new and restless spirit, seeking violently to burst through old and cramping forms, a nervous preoccupation with perpetually changing inner states of consciousness, a longing for the unbounded and the indefinable, for perpetual movement and change, an effort to return to the forgotten sources of life, a passionate effort at self-assertion both individual and collective, a search after means of expressing an unappeasable yearning for unattainable goals".

Romantic artists also shared a strong belief in the importance and inspirational qualities of Nature. Romantics were distrustful of cities and social conventions. They deplored Restoration and Enlightenment Era artists who were largely concerned with depicting and critiquing social relations, thereby neglecting the relationship between people and Nature. Romantics generally believed a close connection with Nature was beneficial for human beings, especially for individuals who broke off from society in order to encounter the natural world by themselves.

Romantic literature was frequently written in a distinctive, personal "voice". As critic M. H. Abrams has observed, "much of romantic poetry invited the reader to identify the protagonists with the poets themselves." This quality in Romantic literature, in turn, influenced the approach and reception of works in other media; it has seeped into everything from critical evaluations of individual style in painting, fashion, and music, to the auteur movement in modern filmmaking.

=== Etymology ===
The group of words with the root "Roman" in the various European languages, such as "romance" and "Romanesque", has a complicated history. By the 18th century, European languages—notably German, French and Slavic languages—were using the term "Roman" in the sense of the English word "novel", i.e. a work of popular narrative fiction. This usage derived from the term "Romance languages", which referred to vernacular (or popular) language in contrast to formal Latin. Most such novels took the form of "chivalric romance", tales of adventure, devotion and honour.

The "founders" of Jena Romanticism, critics (and brothers) August Wilhelm Schlegel and Friedrich Schlegel, began to speak of romantische Poesie ("romantic poetry") in the 1790s, contrasting it with "classic" but in terms of spirit rather than merely dating. Friedrich Schlegel wrote in his 1800 essay "Gespräch über die Poesie" ("Dialogue on Poetry"):

I seek and find the romantic among the older moderns, in Shakespeare, in Cervantes, in Italian poetry, in that age of chivalry, love and fable, from which the phenomenon and the word itself are derived.

The modern sense of the term spread more widely in France by its persistent use by Germaine de Staël in her De l'Allemagne (1813), recounting her travels in Germany. In England Wordsworth wrote in a preface to his poems of 1815 of the "romantic harp" and "classic lyre", but in 1820 Byron could still write, perhaps slightly disingenuously,

I perceive that in Germany, as well as in Italy, there is a great struggle about what they call 'Classical' and 'Romantic', terms which were not subjects of classification in England, at least when I left it four or five years ago.

It is only from the 1820s that Romanticism certainly knew itself by its name, and in 1824 the Académie française took the wholly ineffective step of issuing a decree condemning it in literature.

=== Period ===
The period typically called Romantic varies greatly between different countries and different artistic media or areas of thought. Margaret Drabble described it in literature as taking place "roughly between 1770 and 1848", and few dates much earlier than 1770 will be found. In English literature, M. H. Abrams placed it between 1789, or 1798, the latter a very typical view, and about 1830, perhaps a little later than some other critics. Others have proposed 1780–1830. In other fields and other countries the period denominated as Romantic can be considerably different; musical Romanticism, for example, is generally regarded as only having ceased as a major artistic force as late as 1910, but in an extreme extension the Four Last Songs of Richard Strauss are described stylistically as "Late Romantic" and were composed in 1946–1948. However, in most fields the Romantic period is said to be over by about 1850, or earlier.

The early period of the Romantic era was a time of war, with the French Revolution (1789–1799) followed by the Napoleonic Wars until 1815. These wars, along with the political and social turmoil that went along with them, served as the background for Romanticism. The key generation of French Romantics born between 1795 and 1805 had, in the words of one of their number, Alfred de Vigny, been "conceived between battles, attended school to the rolling of drums". According to Jacques Barzun, there were three generations of Romantic artists. The first emerged in the 1790s and 1800s, the second in the 1820s, and the third later in the century.

=== Context and place in history ===
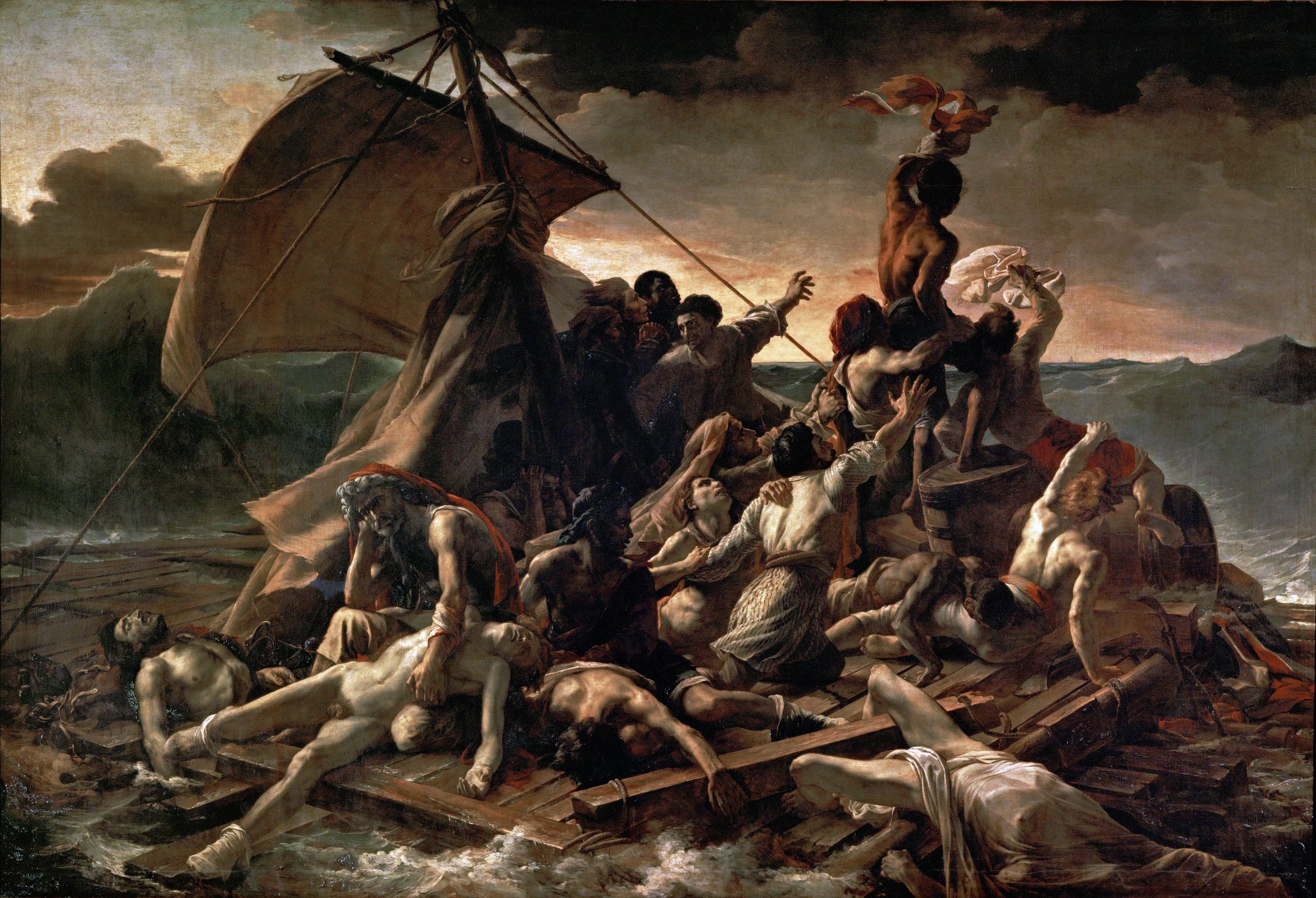
Théodore Géricault, The Raft of the Medusa, 1819, Louvre

The precise characterization and specific definition of Romanticism has been the subject of debate in the fields of intellectual history and literary history throughout the 20th century, without any great measure of consensus emerging. That it was part of the Counter-Enlightenment, a reaction against the Age of Enlightenment, is generally accepted in current scholarship. Its relationship to the French Revolution, which began in 1789 in the very early stages of the period, is clearly important, but highly variable depending on geography and individual reactions. Most Romantics can be said to be broadly progressive in their views, but a considerable number always had, or developed, a wide range of conservative views, and nationalism was in many countries strongly associated with Romanticism, as discussed in detail below.

In philosophy and the history of ideas, Romanticism was seen by Isaiah Berlin as disrupting for over a century the classic Western traditions of rationality and the idea of moral absolutes and agreed values, leading "to something like the melting away of the very notion of objective truth", and hence not only to nationalism, but also fascism and totalitarianism, with a gradual recovery coming only after World War II. For the Romantics, Berlin says,

in the realm of ethics, politics, aesthetics it was the authenticity and sincerity of the pursuit of inner goals that mattered; this applied equally to individuals and groups—states, nations, movements. This is most evident in the aesthetics of romanticism, where the notion of eternal models, a Platonic vision of ideal beauty, which the artist seeks to convey, however imperfectly, on canvas or in sound, is replaced by a passionate belief in spiritual freedom, individual creativity. The painter, the poet, the composer do not hold up a mirror to nature, however ideal, but invent; they do not imitate (the doctrine of mimesis), but create not merely the means but the goals that they pursue; these goals represent the self-expression of the artist's own unique, inner vision, to set aside which in response to the demands of some "external" voice—church, state, public opinion, family friends, arbiters of taste—is an act of betrayal of what alone justifies their existence for those who are in any sense creative.

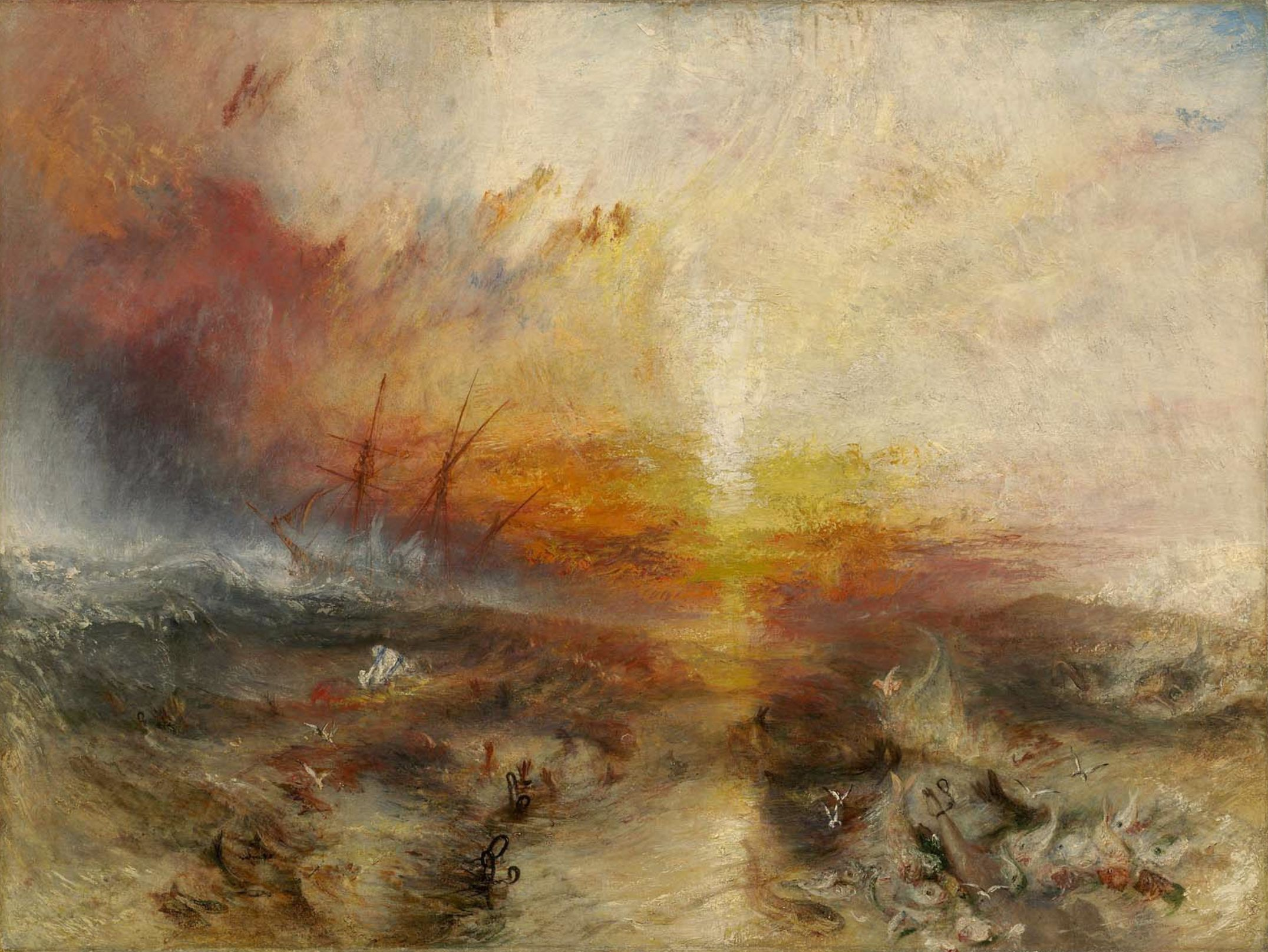
J.M.W. Turner, The Slave Ship, 1840, oil on canvas, Museum of Fine Arts, Boston

Arthur Lovejoy attempted to demonstrate the difficulty of defining Romanticism in his seminal article "On the Discrimination of Romanticisms" in his Essays in the History of Ideas (1948); some scholars see Romanticism as essentially continuous with the present, some like Robert Hughes see in it the inaugural moment of modernity, while writers of the 19th Century such as Chateaubriand, Novalis and Samuel Taylor Coleridge saw it as the beginning of a tradition of resistance to Enlightenment rationalism—a "Counter-Enlightenment"— to be associated most closely with German Romanticism. Another early definition comes from Charles Baudelaire: "Romanticism is precisely situated neither in choice of subject nor exact truth, but in the way of feeling."

The end of the Romantic era is marked in some areas by a new style of Realism, which affected literature, especially the novel and drama, painting, and even music, through Verismo opera. This movement was led by France, with Balzac and Flaubert in literature and Courbet in painting; Stendhal and Goya were important precursors of Realism in their respective media. However, Romantic styles, now often representing the established and safe style against which Realists rebelled, continued to flourish in many fields for the rest of the century and beyond. In music such works from after about 1850 are referred to by some writers as "Late Romantic" and by others as "Neoromantic" or "Postromantic", but other fields do not usually use these terms; in English literature and painting the convenient term "Victorian" avoids having to characterise the period further.

In northern Europe, the Early Romantic visionary optimism and belief that the world was in the process of great change and improvement had largely vanished, and some art became more conventionally political and polemical as its creators engaged polemically with the world as it was. Elsewhere, including in very different ways the United States and Russia, feelings that great change was underway or just about to come were still possible. Displays of intense emotion in art remained prominent, as did the exotic and historical settings pioneered by the Romantics, but experimentation with form and technique was generally reduced, often replaced with meticulous technique, as in the poems of Tennyson or many paintings. If not realist, late 19th-century art was often extremely detailed, and pride was taken in adding authentic details in a way that earlier Romantics did not trouble with. Many Romantic ideas about the nature and purpose of art, above all the pre-eminent importance of originality, remained important for later generations, and often underlie modern views, despite opposition from theorists.

== Literature ==
Henry Wallis, The Death of Chatterton 1856, by suicide at 17 in 1770

In literature, Romanticism found recurrent themes in the evocation or criticism of the past, the cult of "sensibility" with its emphasis on women and children, the isolation of the artist or narrator, and respect for nature. Furthermore, several romantic authors, such as Edgar Allan Poe, Charles Maturin and Nathaniel Hawthorne, based their writings on the supernatural/occult and human psychology. Romanticism tended to regard satire as something unworthy of serious attention, a view still influential today. The Romantic movement in literature was preceded by the Enlightenment and succeeded by Realism.

The precursors of Romanticism in English poetry go back to the middle of the 18th century, including figures such as Joseph Warton (headmaster at Winchester College) and his brother Thomas Warton, Professor of Poetry at Oxford University. Joseph maintained that invention and imagination were the chief qualities of a poet. The Scottish poet James Macpherson influenced the early development of Romanticism with the international success of his Ossian cycle of poems published in 1762, inspiring both Goethe and the young Walter Scott. Thomas Chatterton is generally considered the first Romantic poet in English. Both Chatterton and Macpherson's work involved elements of fraud, as what they claimed was earlier literature that they had discovered or compiled was, in fact, entirely their own work. The Gothic novel, beginning with Horace Walpole's The Castle of Otranto (1764), was an important precursor of one strain of Romanticism, with a delight in horror and threat, and exotic picturesque settings, matched in Walpole's case by his role in the early revival of Gothic architecture. Tristram Shandy, a novel by Laurence Sterne (1759–1767), introduced a whimsical version of the anti-rational sentimental novel to the English literary public.

=== Germany ===
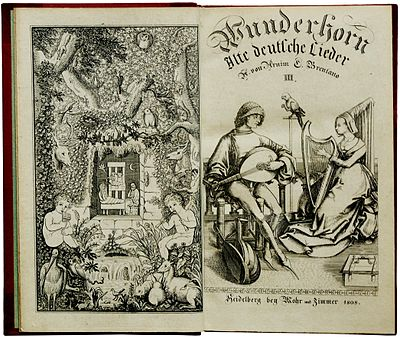
Title page of Volume III of Des Knaben Wunderhorn, 1808

An early German influence came from Johann Wolfgang von Goethe, whose 1774 novel The Sorrows of Young Werther had young men throughout Europe emulating its protagonist, a young artist with a very sensitive and passionate temperament. At that time Germany was a multitude of small separate states, and Goethe's works would have a seminal influence in developing a unifying sense of nationalism. Another philosophical influence came from the German idealism of Johann Gottlieb Fichte and Friedrich Schelling, making Jena (where Fichte lived, as well as Schelling, Hegel, Schiller and the brothers Schlegel) a centre for early German Romanticism (also known as Jena Romanticism). Important writers were Ludwig Tieck, Novalis, Heinrich von Kleist, Friedrich Hölderlin and Heinrich Heine. Heidelberg later became a centre of German Romanticism, where writers and poets such as Clemens Brentano, Achim von Arnim and Joseph Freiherr von Eichendorff (Aus dem Leben eines Taugenichts) met regularly in literary circles.

Important motifs in German Romanticism are travelling, nature, for example the German Forest, and Germanic myths. The later German Romanticism of, for example E. T. A. Hoffmann's Der Sandmann (The Sandman), 1817, and Joseph Freiherr von Eichendorff's Das Marmorbild (The Marble Statue), 1819, was darker in its motifs and has gothic elements. The significance to Romanticism of childhood innocence, the importance of imagination, and racial theories all combined to give an unprecedented importance to folk literature, non-classical mythology and children's literature, above all in Germany. Brentano and von Arnim were significant literary figures who together published Des Knaben Wunderhorn ("The Boy's Magic Horn" or cornucopia), a collection of versified folk tales, in 1806–1808. The first collection of Grimms' Fairy Tales by the Brothers Grimm was published in 1812. Unlike the much later work of Hans Christian Andersen, who was publishing his invented tales in Danish from 1835, these German works were at least mainly based on collected folk tales, and the Grimms remained true to the style of the telling in their early editions, though later rewriting some parts. One of the brothers, Jacob, published in 1835 Deutsche Mythologie, a long academic work on Germanic mythology. Another strain is exemplified by Schiller's highly emotional language and the depiction of physical violence in his play The Robbers of 1781.

=== Great Britain ===
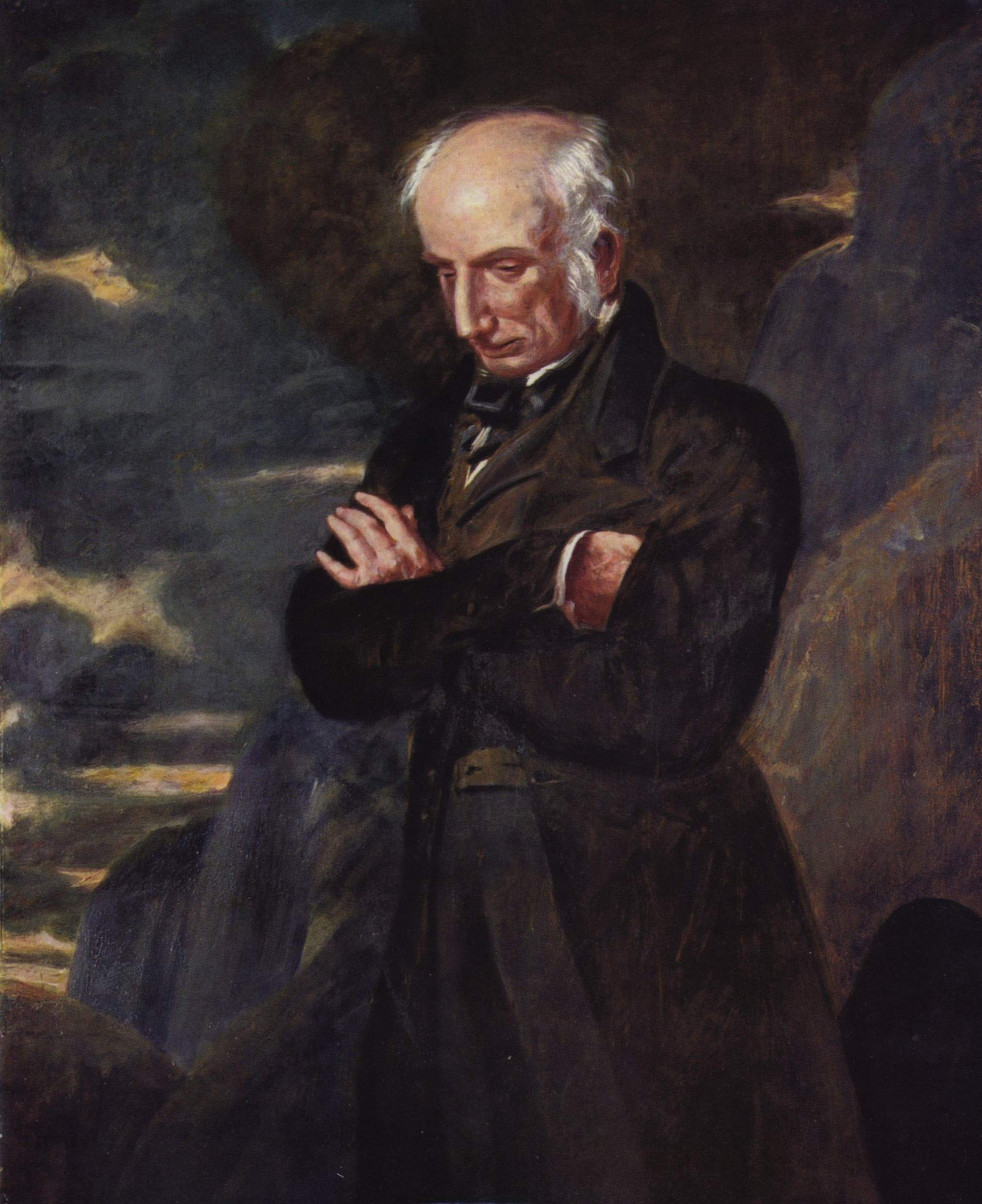
William Wordsworth (pictured) and Samuel Taylor Coleridge helped to launch the Romantic Age in English literature in 1798 with their joint publication Lyrical Ballads.

In English literature, the key figures of the Romantic movement are considered to be the group of poets including William Wordsworth, Samuel Taylor Coleridge, John Keats, Lord Byron, Percy Bysshe Shelley and the much older William Blake, followed later by the isolated figure of John Clare; also such novelists as Walter Scott from Scotland and Mary Shelley, and the essayists William Hazlitt and Charles Lamb. The publication in 1798 of Lyrical Ballads, with many of the finest poems by Wordsworth and Coleridge, is often held to mark the start of the movement.The majority of the poems in Lyrical Ballads were by Wordsworth, and many dealt with the lives of the poor in his native Lake District, or his feelings about nature—which he more fully developed in his long poem The Prelude, never published in his lifetime. The longest poem in the Lyrical Ballads was Coleridge's The Rime of the Ancient Mariner, which showed the Gothic side of English Romanticism, and the exotic settings that many works featured. In the period when the two were writing, the Lake Poets were widely regarded as a marginal group of radicals, though they were supported by the critic and writer William Hazlitt and others.

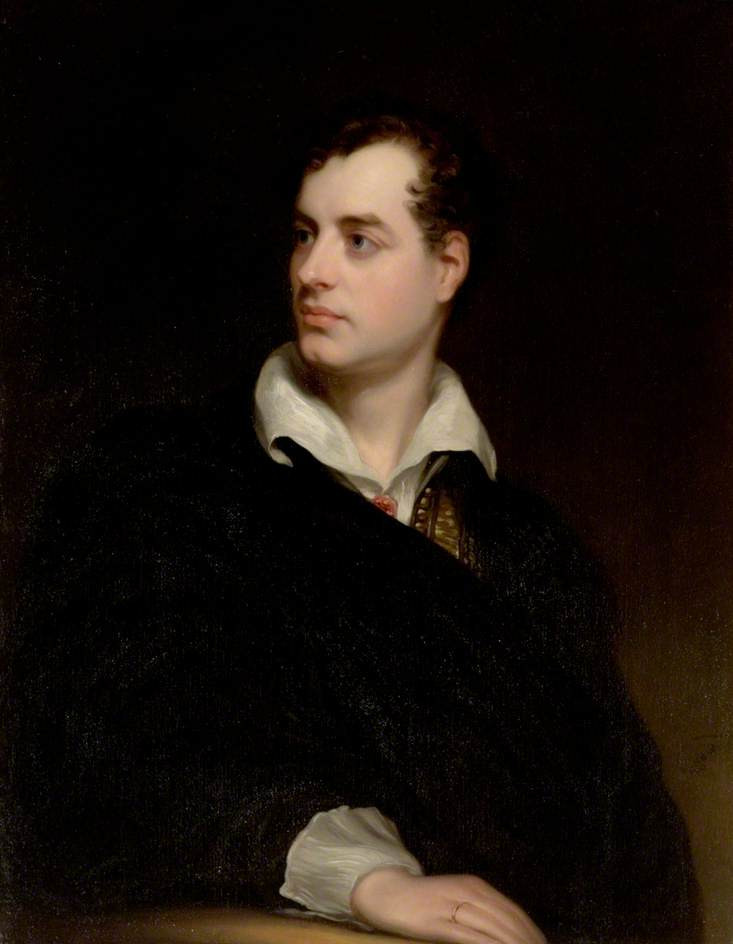
Portrait of Lord Byron by Thomas Phillips, c. 1813. The Byronic hero first reached the wider public in Byron's semi-autobiographical epic narrative poem Childe Harold's Pilgrimage (1812–1818).

In contrast, Lord Byron and Walter Scott achieved enormous fame and influence throughout Europe with works exploiting the violence and drama of their exotic and historical settings; Goethe called Byron "undoubtedly the greatest genius of our century". Scott achieved immediate success with his long narrative poem The Lay of the Last Minstrel in 1805, followed by the full epic poem Marmion in 1808. Both were set in the distant Scottish past, already evoked in Ossian; Romanticism and Scotland were to have a long and fruitful partnership. Byron had equal success with the first part of Childe Harold's Pilgrimage in 1812, followed by four "Turkish tales", all in the form of long poems, starting with The Giaour in 1813, drawing from his Grand Tour, which had reached Ottoman Europe, and orientalizing the themes of the Gothic novel in verse. These featured different variations of the "Byronic hero", and his own life contributed a further version. Scott meanwhile was effectively inventing the historical novel, beginning in 1814 with Waverley, set in the 1745 Jacobite rising, which was a highly profitable success, followed by over 20 further Waverley Novels over the next 17 years, with settings going back to the Crusades that he had researched to a degree that was new in literature.

In contrast to Germany, Romanticism in English literature had little connection with nationalism, and the Romantics were often regarded with suspicion for the sympathy many felt for the ideals of the French Revolution, whose collapse and replacement with the dictatorship of Napoleon was, as elsewhere in Europe, a shock to the movement. Though his novels celebrated Scottish identity and history, Scott was politically a firm Unionist, but admitted to Jacobite sympathies. Several Romantics spent much time abroad, and a famous stay on Lake Geneva with Byron and Shelley in 1816 produced the hugely influential novel Frankenstein by Shelley's wife-to-be Mary Shelley and the novella The Vampyre by Byron's doctor John William Polidori. The lyrics of Robert Burns in Scotland, and Thomas Moore from Ireland, reflected in different ways their countries and the Romantic interest in folk literature, but neither had a fully Romantic approach to life or their work.

Though they have modern critical champions such as György Lukács, Scott's novels are today more likely to be experienced in the form of the many operas that composers continued to base on them over the following decades, such as Donizetti's Lucia di Lammermoor and Vincenzo Bellini's I puritani (both 1835). Byron is now most highly regarded for his short lyrics and his generally unromantic prose writings, especially his letters, and his unfinished satire Don Juan. Unlike many Romantics, Byron's widely publicised personal life appeared to match his work, and his death at 36 in 1824 from disease when helping the Greek War of Independence appeared from a distance to be a suitably Romantic end, entrenching his legend. Keats in 1821 and Shelley in 1822 both died in Italy, Blake (at almost 70) in 1827, and Coleridge largely ceased to write in the 1820s. Wordsworth was by 1820 respectable and highly regarded, holding a government sinecure, but wrote relatively little. In the discussion of English literature, the Romantic period is often regarded as finishing around the 1820s, or sometimes even earlier, although many authors of the succeeding decades were no less committed to Romantic values.

The most significant novelist in English during the peak Romantic period, other than Walter Scott, was Jane Austen, whose essentially conservative world-view had little in common with her Romantic contemporaries, retaining a strong belief in decorum and social rules, though critics such as Claudia L. Johnson have detected tremors under the surface of many works, such as Northanger Abbey (1817), Mansfield Park (1814) and Persuasion (1817). But around the mid-century the undoubtedly Romantic novels of the Yorkshire-based Brontë family appeared, most notably Charlotte's Jane Eyre and Emily's Wuthering Heights, both published in 1847, which also introduced more Gothic themes. While these two novels were written and published after the Romantic period is said to have ended, their novels were heavily influenced by Romantic literature they had read as children.

Byron, Keats, and Shelley all wrote for the stage, but with little success in England, with Shelley's The Cenci perhaps the best work produced, though that was not played in a public theatre in England until a century after his death. Byron's plays, along with dramatizations of his poems and Scott's novels, were much more popular on the Continent, and especially in France, and through these versions several were turned into operas, many still performed today. If contemporary poets had little success on the stage, the period was a legendary one for performances of Shakespeare, and went some way to restoring his original texts and removing the Augustan "improvements" to them. The greatest actor of the period, Edmund Kean, restored the tragic ending to King Lear; Coleridge said that "Seeing him act was like reading Shakespeare by flashes of lightning."

==== Scotland ====
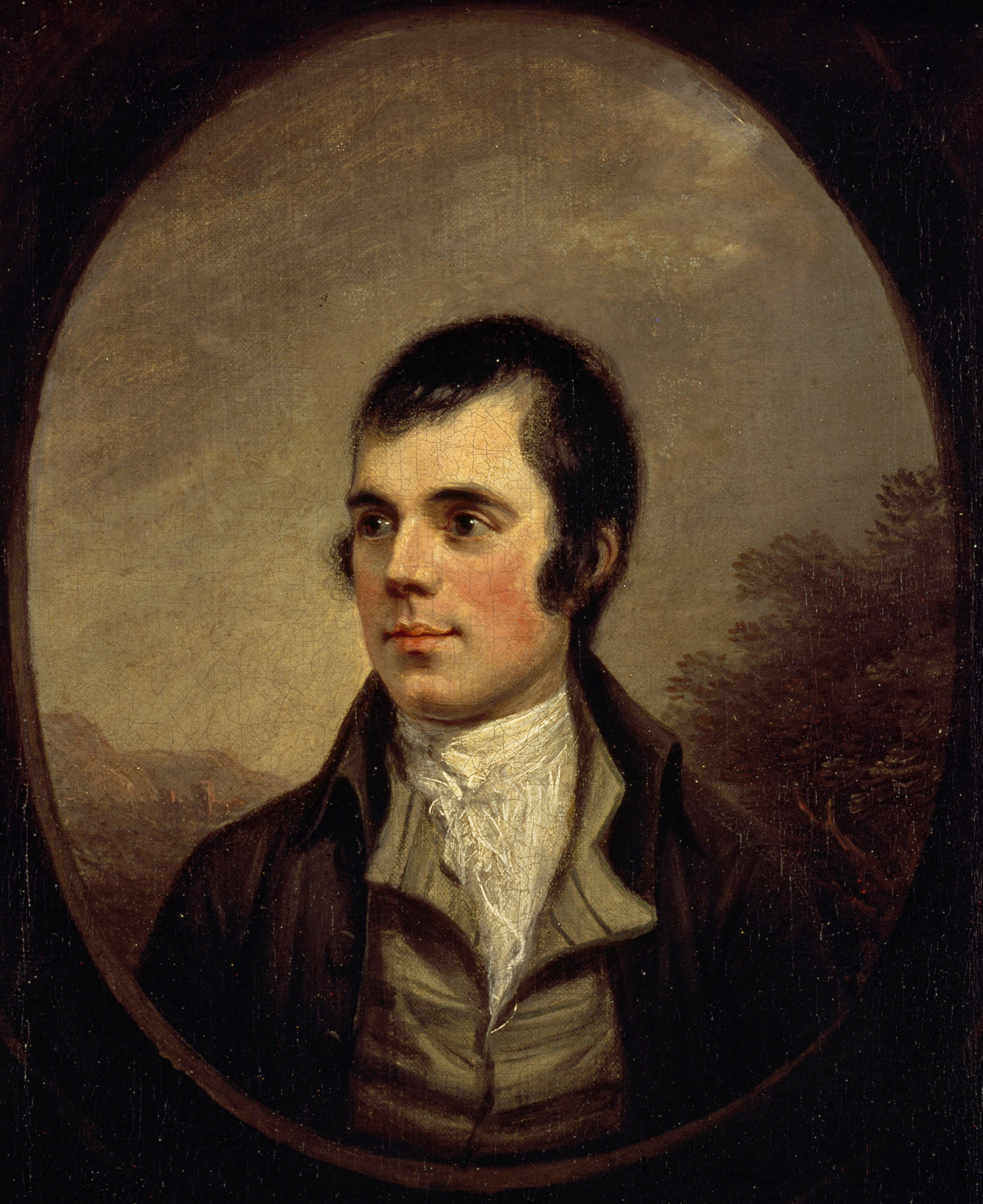
Robert Burns in Alexander Nasmyth's portrait of 1787

Although after union with England in 1707 Scotland increasingly adopted English language and wider cultural norms, its literature developed a distinct national identity and began to enjoy an international reputation. Allan Ramsay (1686–1758) laid the foundations of a reawakening of interest in older Scottish literature, as well as leading the trend for pastoral poetry, helping to develop the Habbie stanza as a poetic form. James Macpherson (1736–1796) was the first Scottish poet to gain an international reputation. Claiming to have found poetry written by the ancient bard Ossian, he published translations that acquired international popularity, being proclaimed as a Celtic equivalent of the Classical epics. Fingal, written in 1762, was speedily translated into many European languages, and its appreciation of natural beauty and treatment of the ancient legend has been credited more than any single work with bringing about the Romantic movement in European, and especially in German literature, through its influence on Johann Gottfried von Herder and Johann Wolfgang von Goethe. It was also popularised in France by figures that included Napoleon. Eventually it became clear that the poems were not direct translations from Scottish Gaelic, but flowery adaptations made to suit the aesthetic expectations of his audience.

Robert Burns (1759–96) and Walter Scott (1771–1832) were highly influenced by the Ossian cycle. Burns, an Ayrshire poet and lyricist, is widely regarded as the national poet of Scotland and a major influence on the Romantic movement. His poem (and song) "Auld Lang Syne" is often sung at Hogmanay (the last day of the year), and "Scots Wha Hae" served for a long time as an unofficial national anthem of the country. Scott began as a poet and also collected and published Scottish ballads. His first prose work, Waverley in 1814, is often called the first historical novel. It launched a highly successful career, with other historical novels such as Rob Roy (1817), The Heart of Midlothian (1818) and Ivanhoe (1820). Scott probably did more than any other figure to define and popularise Scottish cultural identity in the nineteenth century. Other major literary figures connected with Romanticism include the poets and novelists James Hogg (1770–1835), Allan Cunningham (1784–1842) and John Galt (1779–1839).

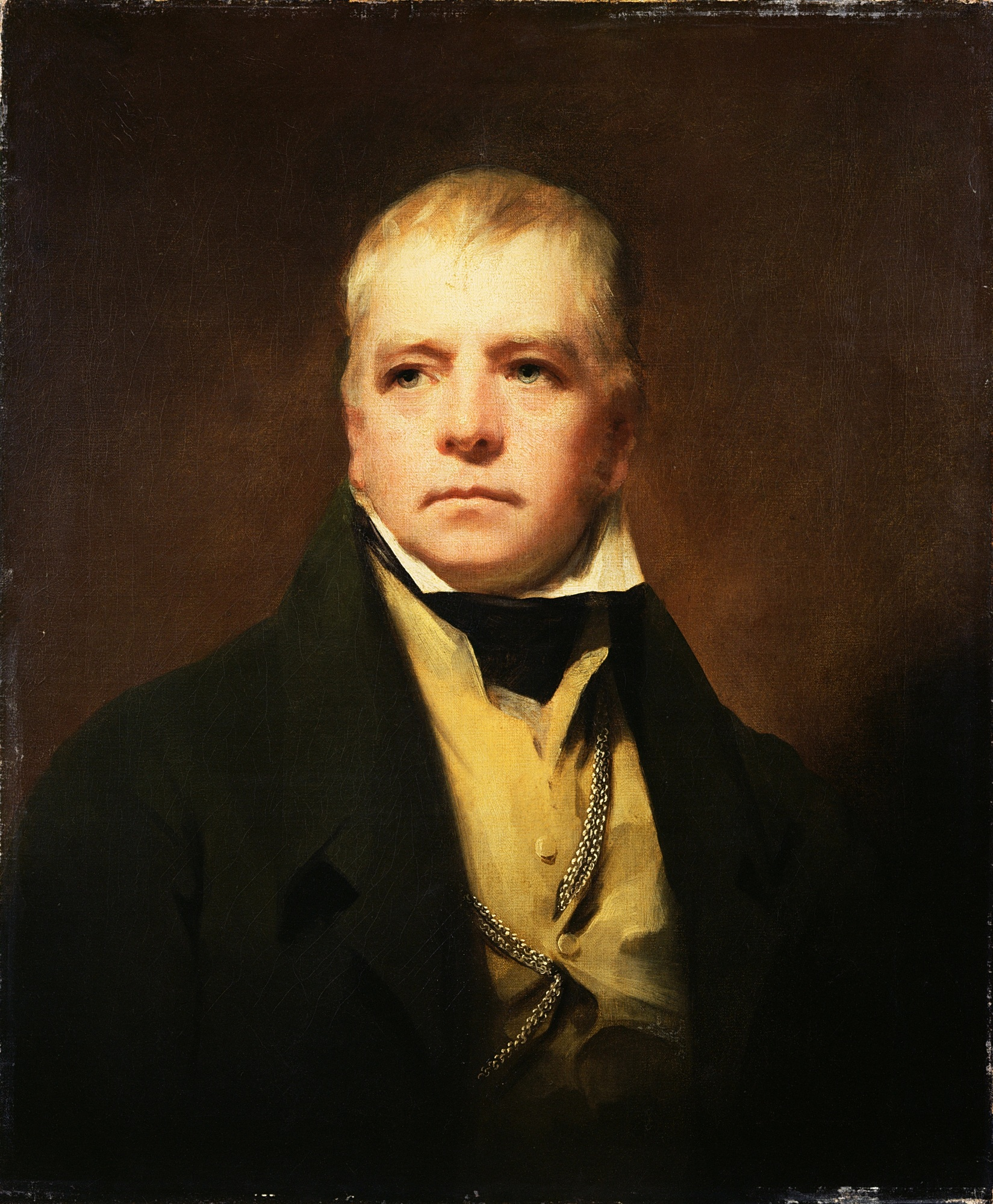
Raeburn's portrait of Walter Scott in 1822

Scotland was also the location of two of the most important literary magazines of the era, The Edinburgh Review (founded in 1802) and Blackwood's Magazine (founded in 1817), which had a major impact on the development of British literature and drama in the era of Romanticism. Ian Duncan and Alex Benchimol suggest that publications like the novels of Scott and these magazines were part of a highly dynamic Scottish Romanticism that by the early nineteenth century, caused Edinburgh to emerge as the cultural capital of Britain and become central to a wider formation of a "British Isles nationalism".

Scottish "national drama" emerged in the early 1800s, as plays with specifically Scottish themes began to dominate the Scottish stage. Theatres had been discouraged by the Church of Scotland and fears of Jacobite assemblies. In the later eighteenth century, many plays were written for and performed by small amateur companies and were not published and so most have been lost. Towards the end of the century there were "closet dramas", primarily designed to be read, rather than performed, including work by Scott, Hogg, Galt and Joanna Baillie (1762–1851), often influenced by the ballad tradition and Gothic Romanticism.

=== France ===
Romanticism was relatively late in developing in French literature, more so than in the visual arts. The 18th-century precursor to Romanticism, the cult of sensibility, had become associated with the Ancien Régime, and the French Revolution had been more of an inspiration to foreign writers than those experiencing it at first-hand. The first major figure was François-René de Chateaubriand, an aristocrat who had remained a royalist throughout the Revolution, and returned to France from exile in England and America under Napoleon, with whose regime he had an uneasy relationship. His writings, all in prose, included some fiction, such as his influential novella of exile René (1802), which anticipated Byron in its alienated hero, but mostly contemporary history and politics, his travels, a defence of religion and the medieval spirit (Génie du christianisme, 1802), and finally in the 1830s and 1840s his enormous autobiography Mémoires d'Outre-Tombe ("Memoirs from beyond the grave").

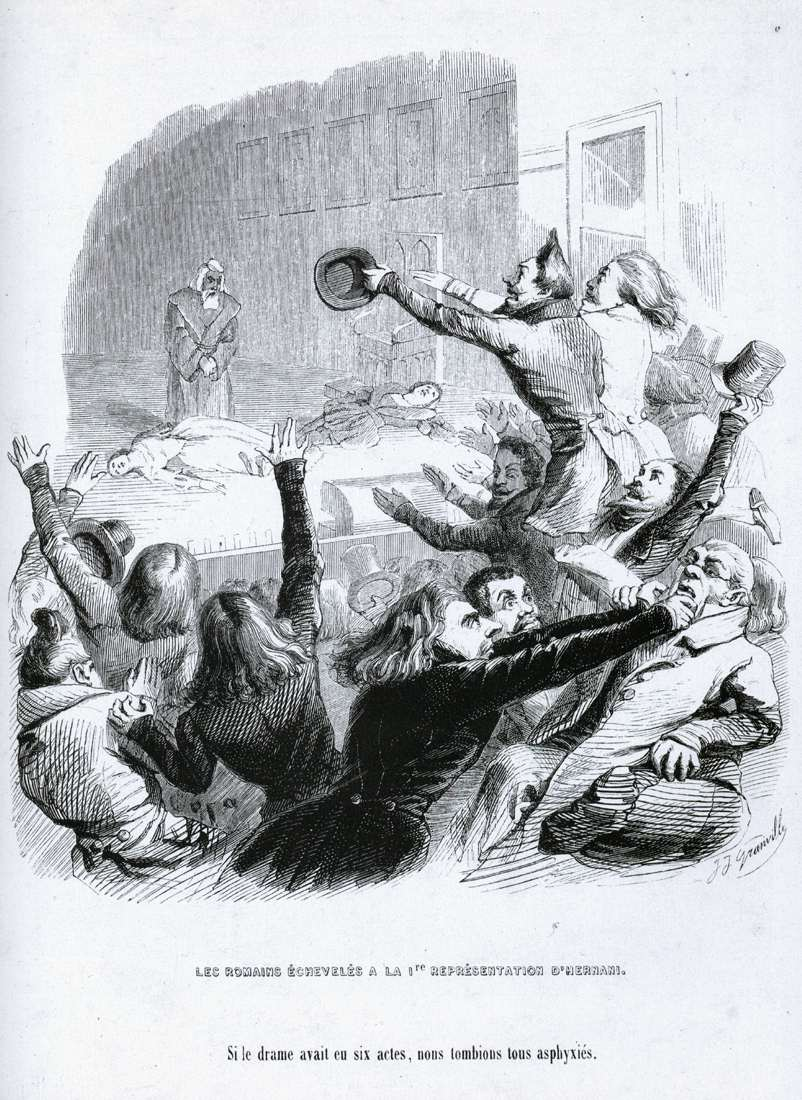
The "battle of Hernani" was fought nightly at the theatre in 1830: lithograph, by J. J. Grandville

After the Bourbon Restoration, French Romanticism developed in the lively world of Parisian theatre, with productions of Shakespeare, Schiller (in France a key Romantic author), and adaptations of Scott and Byron alongside French authors, several of whom began to write in the late 1820s. Cliques of pro- and anti-Romantics developed, and productions were often accompanied by raucous vocalizing by the two sides, including the shouted assertion by one theatregoer in 1822 that "Shakespeare, c'est l'aide-de-camp de Wellington" ("Shakespeare is Wellington's aide-de-camp"). Alexandre Dumas began as a dramatist, with a series of successes beginning with Henri III et sa cour (1829) before turning to novels that were mostly historical adventures somewhat in the manner of Scott, most famously The Three Musketeers and The Count of Monte Cristo, both of 1844. Victor Hugo published as a poet in the 1820s before achieving success on the stage with Hernani—a historical drama in a quasi-Shakespearean style that had famously riotous performances on its first run in 1830. Like Dumas, Hugo is best known for his novels, and was already writing The Hunchback of Notre-Dame (1831), one of the best known works, which became a paradigm of the French Romantic movement. The preface to his unperformed play Cromwell gives an important manifesto of French Romanticism, stating that "there are no rules, or models". The career of Prosper Mérimée followed a similar pattern; he is now best known as the originator of the story of Carmen, with his novella published 1845. Alfred de Vigny remains best known as a dramatist, with his play on the life of the English poet Chatterton (1835) perhaps his best work. George Sand was a central figure of the Parisian literary scene, famous both for her novels and criticism and her affairs with Chopin and several others; she too was inspired by the theatre, and wrote works to be staged at her private estate.

French Romantic poets of the 1830s to 1850s include Alfred de Musset, Gérard de Nerval, Alphonse de Lamartine and the flamboyant Théophile Gautier, whose prolific output in various forms continued until his death in 1872.

Stendhal is today probably the most highly regarded French novelist of the period, but he stands in a complex relation with Romanticism, and is notable for his penetrating psychological insight into his characters and his realism, qualities rarely prominent in Romantic fiction. As a survivor of the French retreat from Moscow in 1812, fantasies of heroism and adventure had little appeal for him, and like Goya he is often seen as a forerunner of Realism. His most important works are Le Rouge et le Noir (The Red and the Black, 1830) and La Chartreuse de Parme (The Charterhouse of Parma, 1839).

=== Poland ===
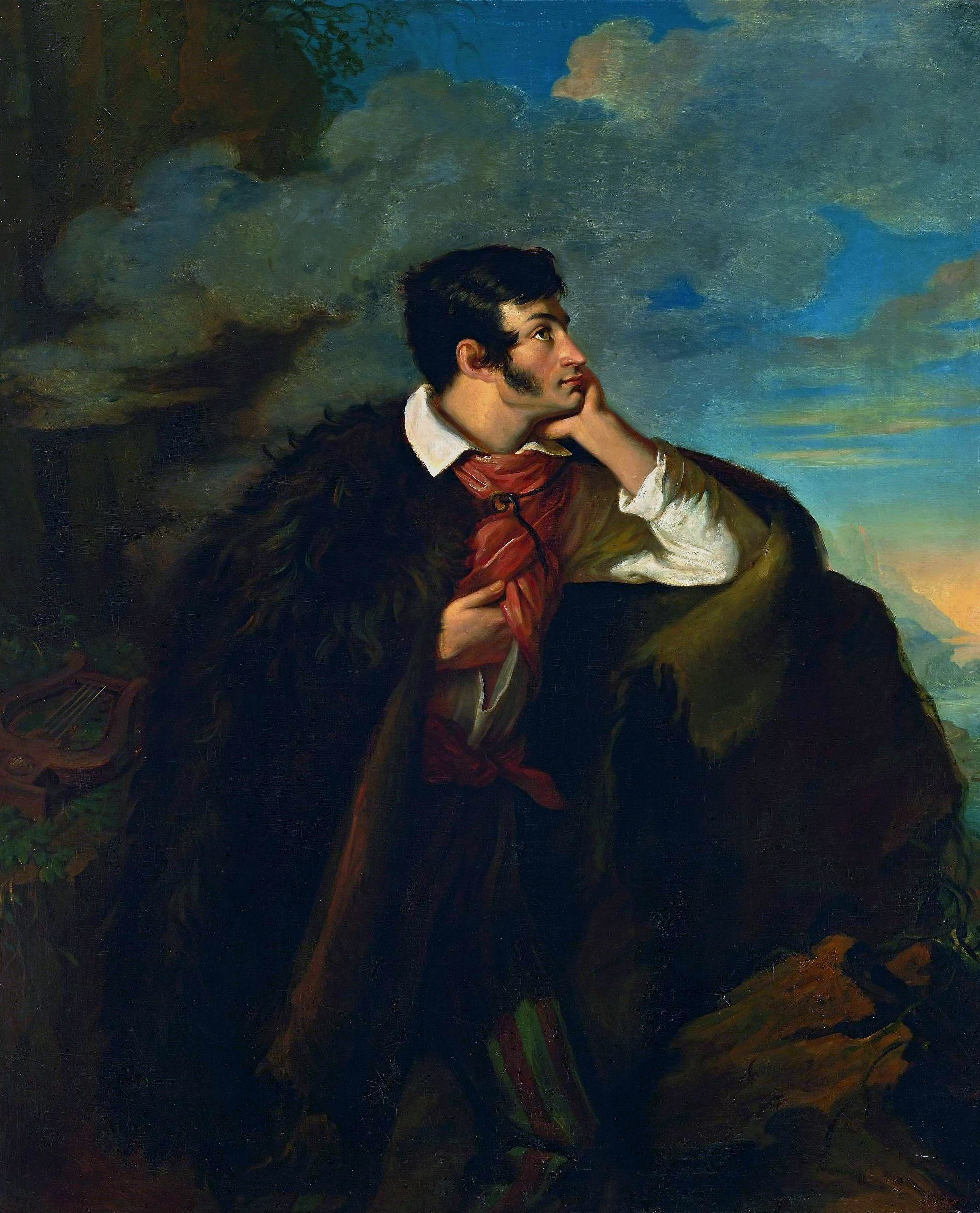
Adam Mickiewicz on the Ayu-Dag, by Walenty Wańkowicz, 1828

Romanticism in Poland is often taken to begin with the publication of Adam Mickiewicz's first poems in 1822, and end with the crushing of the January Uprising of 1863 against the Russians. It was strongly marked by interest in Polish history. Polish Romanticism revived the old "Sarmatism" traditions of the szlachta or Polish nobility. Old traditions and customs were revived and portrayed in a positive light in the Polish messianic movement and in works of great Polish poets such as Adam Mickiewicz (Pan Tadeusz), Juliusz Słowacki and Zygmunt Krasiński. This close connection between Polish Romanticism and Polish history became one of the defining qualities of the literature of Polish Romanticism period, differentiating it from that of other countries. They had not suffered the loss of national statehood as was the case with Poland. Influenced by the general spirit and main ideas of European Romanticism, the literature of Polish Romanticism is unique, as many scholars have pointed out, in having developed largely outside of Poland and in its emphatic focus upon the issue of Polish nationalism. The Polish intelligentsia, along with leading members of its government, left Poland in the early 1830s, during what is referred to as the "Great Emigration", resettling in France, Germany, Great Britain, Turkey, and the United States.

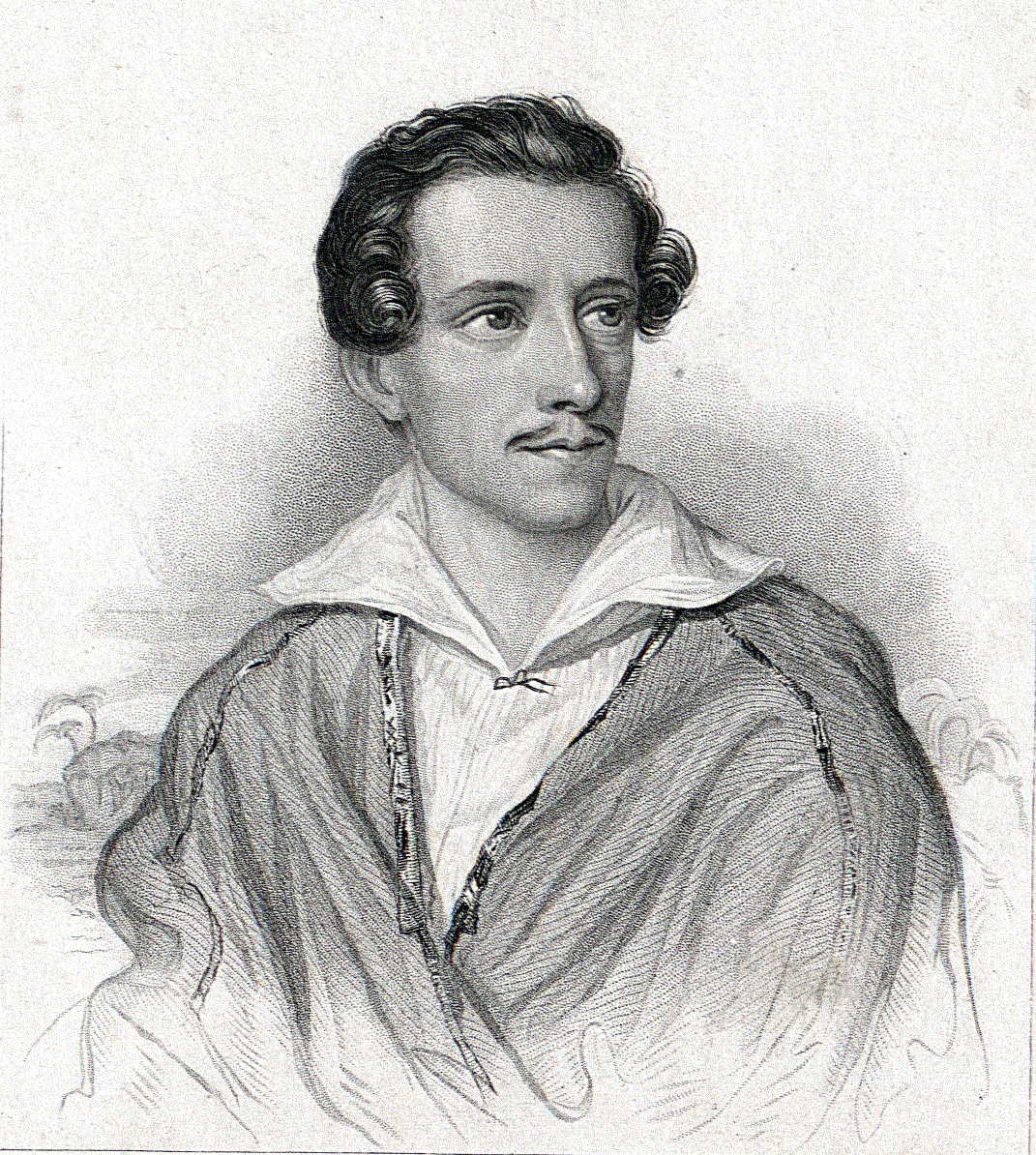
Juliusz Słowacki, a Polish poet considered one of the "Three National Bards" of Polish literature—a major figure in the Polish Romantic period, and the father of modern Polish drama

Their art featured emotionalism and irrationality, fantasy and imagination, personality cults, folklore and country life, and the propagation of ideals of freedom. In the second period, many of the Polish Romantics worked abroad, often banished from Poland by the occupying powers due to their politically subversive ideas. Their work became increasingly dominated by the ideals of political struggle for freedom and their country's sovereignty. Elements of mysticism became more prominent. There developed the idea of the poeta wieszcz (the prophet). The wieszcz (bard) functioned as spiritual leader to the nation fighting for its independence. The most notable poet so recognized was Adam Mickiewicz.

Zygmunt Krasiński also wrote to inspire political and religious hope in his countrymen. Unlike his predecessors, who called for victory at whatever price in Poland's struggle against Russia, Krasinski emphasized Poland's spiritual role in its fight for independence, advocating an intellectual rather than a military superiority. His works best exemplify the Messianic movement in Poland: in two early dramas, Nie-boska komedia (1835; The Undivine Comedy) and Irydion (1836; Iridion), as well as in the later Psalmy przyszłości (1845), he asserted that Poland was the Christ of Europe: specifically chosen by God to carry the world's burdens, to suffer, and eventually be resurrected.

=== Russia ===
Early Russian Romanticism is associated with the writers Konstantin Batyushkov (A Vision on the Shores of the Lethe, 1809), Vasily Zhukovsky (The Bard, 1811; Svetlana, 1813) and Nikolay Karamzin (Poor Liza, 1792; Julia, 1796; Martha the Mayoress, 1802; The Sensitive and the Cold, 1803). However the principal exponent of Romanticism in Russia is Alexander Pushkin (The Prisoner of the Caucasus, 1820–1821; The Robber Brothers, 1822; Ruslan and Ludmila, 1820; Eugene Onegin, 1825–1832). Pushkin's work influenced many writers in the 19th century and led to his eventual recognition as Russia's greatest poet. Other Russian Romantic poets include Mikhail Lermontov (the novel A Hero of Our Time, 1839), Fyodor Tyutchev (Silentium!, 1830), Yevgeny Baratynsky (Eda, 1826), Anton Delvig, and Wilhelm Küchelbecker.

Influenced heavily by Lord Byron, Lermontov sought to explore the Romantic emphasis on metaphysical discontent with society and self, while Tyutchev's poems often described scenes of nature or passions of love. Tyutchev commonly operated with such categories as night and day, north and south, dream and reality, cosmos and chaos, and the still world of winter and spring teeming with life. Baratynsky's style was fairly classical in nature, dwelling on the models of the previous century.

=== Spain ===
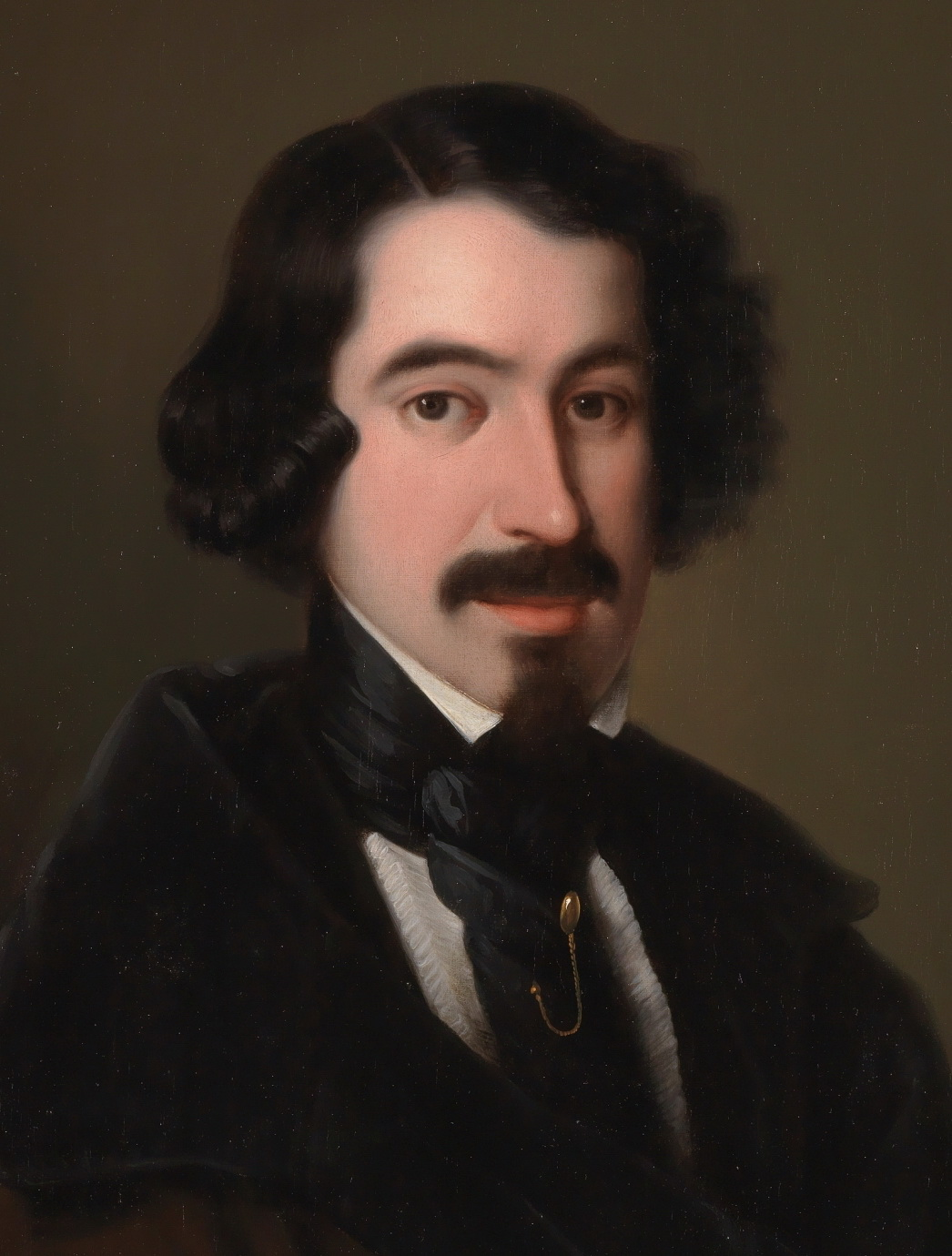
El escritor José de Espronceda, portrait by Antonio María Esquivel (c. 1845) (Museo del Prado, Madrid)

Romanticism in Spanish literature developed a well-known literature with a huge variety of poets and playwrights. The most important Spanish poets during this movement were Gustavo Adolfo Bécquer and José de Espronceda. After them there were other poets like Mariano José de Larra and the dramatists Ángel de Saavedra and José Zorrilla, author of Don Juan Tenorio. Before them may be mentioned the pre-romantics José Cadalso and Manuel José Quintana. The plays of Antonio García Gutiérrez were adapted to produce Giuseppe Verdi's operas Il trovatore and Simon Boccanegra. Spanish Romanticism also influenced regional literatures. For example, in Catalonia and in Galicia there was a national boom of writers in the local languages, like the Catalan Jacint Verdaguer and the Galician Rosalía de Castro, the main figures of the national revivalist movements Renaixença and Rexurdimento, respectively.

There are scholars who consider Spanish Romanticism to be Proto-Existentialism because it is more anguished than the movement in other European countries. Foster et al., for example, say that the work of Spain's writers such as Espronceda, Larra, and other writers in the 19th century demonstrated a "metaphysical crisis". These observers put more weight on the link between the 19th-century Spanish writers with the existentialist movement that emerged immediately after. According to Richard Caldwell, the writers that we now identify with Spain's romanticism were actually precursors to those who galvanized the literary movement that emerged in the 1920s. This notion is the subject of debate for there are authors who stress that Spain's romanticism is one of the earliest in Europe, while some assert that Spain really had no period of literary romanticism. This controversy underscores a certain uniqueness to Spanish Romanticism in comparison to its European counterparts.

=== Portugal ===
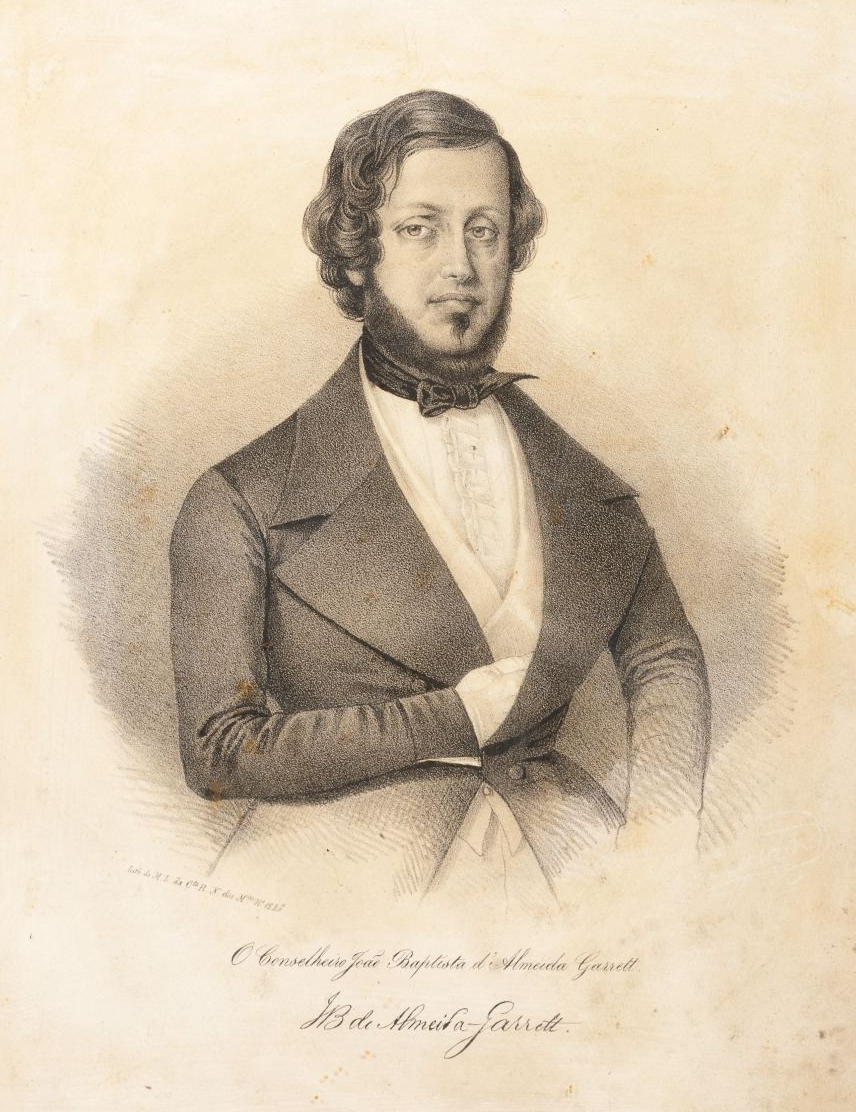
Portuguese poet, novelist, politician and playwright Almeida Garrett (1799–1854)

Romanticism began in Portugal with the publication of the poem Camões (1825), by Almeida Garrett, who was raised by his uncle D. Alexandre, bishop of Angra, in the precepts of Neoclassicism, which can be observed in his early work. The author himself confesses (in Camões' preface) that he voluntarily refused to follow the principles of epic poetry enunciated by Aristotle in his Poetics, as he did the same to Horace's Ars Poetica. Almeida Garrett had participated in the 1820 Liberal Revolution, which caused him to exile himself in England in 1823 and then in France, after the Vila-Francada. While living in Great Britain, he had contacts with the Romantic movement and read authors such as Shakespeare, Scott, Ossian, Byron, Hugo, Lamartine and de Staël, at the same time visiting feudal castles and ruins of Gothic churches and abbeys, which would be reflected in his writings. In 1838, he presented Um Auto de Gil Vicente ("A Play by Gil Vicente"), in an attempt to create a new national theatre, free of Greco-Roman and foreign influence. But his masterpiece would be Frei Luís de Sousa (1843), named by himself as a "Romantic drama" and it was acclaimed as an exceptional work, dealing with themes as national independence, faith, justice and love. He was also deeply interested in Portuguese folkloric verse, which resulted in the publication of Romanceiro ("Traditional Portuguese Ballads") (1843), that recollect a great number of ancient popular ballads, known as "romances" or "rimances", in redondilha maior verse form, that contained stories of chivalry, life of saints, crusades, courtly love, etc. He wrote the novels Viagens na Minha Terra, O Arco de Sant'Ana and Helena.

Alexandre Herculano is, alongside Almeida Garrett, one of the founders of Portuguese Romanticism. He too was forced to exile to Great Britain and France because of his liberal ideals. All of his poetry and prose are (unlike Almeida Garrett's) entirely Romantic, rejecting Greco-Roman myth and history. He sought inspiration in medieval Portuguese poems and chronicles as in the Bible. His output is vast and covers many different genres, such as historical essays, poetry, novels, opuscules and theatre, where he brings back a whole world of Portuguese legends, tradition and history, especially in Eurico, o Presbítero ("Eurico, the Priest") and Lendas e Narrativas ("Legends and Narratives"). His work was influenced by Chateaubriand, Schiller, Klopstock, Walter Scott and the Old Testament Psalms.

António Feliciano de Castilho made the case for Ultra-Romanticism, publishing the poems A Noite no Castelo ("Night in the Castle") and Os Ciúmes do Bardo ("The Jealousy of the Bard"), both in 1836, and the drama Camões. He became an unquestionable master for successive Ultra-Romantic generations, whose influence would not be challenged until the famous Coimbra Question. He also created polemics by translating Goethe's Faust without knowing German, but using French versions of the play. Other notable figures of Portuguese Romanticism are the famous novelists Camilo Castelo Branco and Júlio Dinis, and Soares de Passos, Bulhão Pato and Pinheiro Chagas.

Romantic style would be revived in the beginning of the 20th century, notably through the works of poets linked to the Portuguese Renaissance, such as Teixeira de Pascoais, Jaime Cortesão, Mário Beirão, among others, who can be considered Neo-Romantics. An early Portuguese expression of Romanticism is found already in poets such as Manuel Maria Barbosa du Bocage (especially in his sonnets dated at the end of the 18th century) and Leonor de Almeida Portugal, Marquise of Alorna.

=== Italy ===
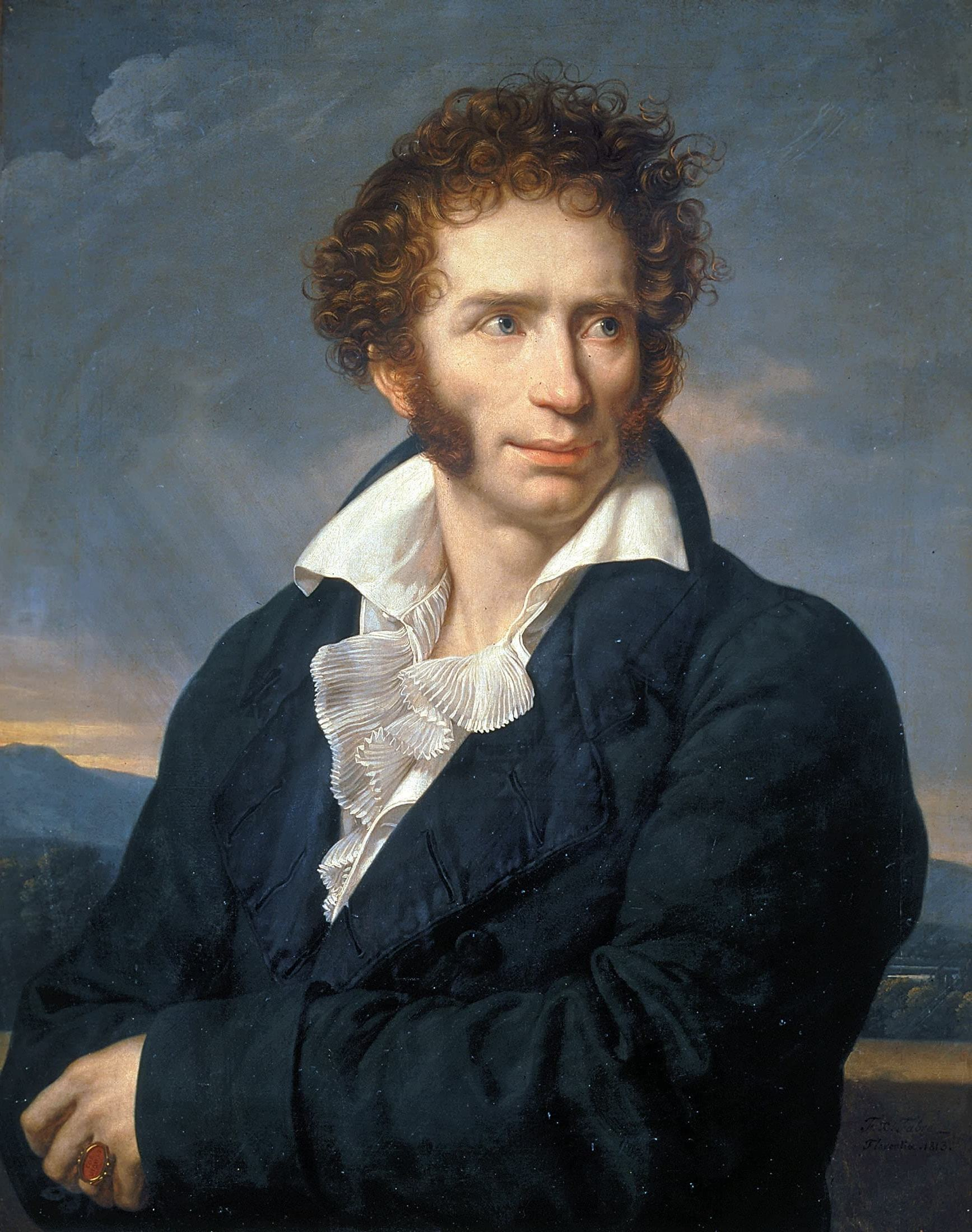
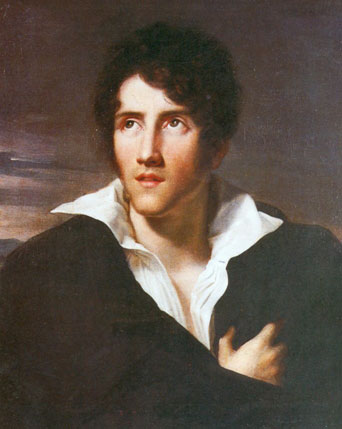
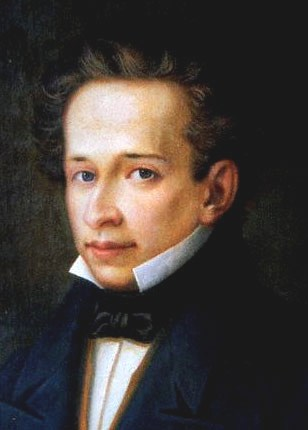
Foscolo, Manzoni and Leopardi, the three crowns of Italian Romanticism

Romanticism in Italian literature was initially a minor movement although some important works were later produced; it began officially in 1816 when Germaine de Staël wrote an article in the journal Biblioteca italiana called "On the manner and usefulness of translations", inviting Italian people to reject Neoclassicism and to study new authors from other countries.

Before that date, Ugo Foscolo had already published poems anticipating Romantic themes. The most important Romantic writers were Ludovico di Breme, Pietro Borsieri and Giovanni Berchet. Better known authors such as Alessandro Manzoni and Giacomo Leopardi were influenced by Enlightenment as well as by Romanticism and Classicism.

Among minor Romantic authors were d'Azeglio, Pellico, Niccolini, Nievo, Guerrazzi, Aleardi, Prati, Botero.

=== South America ===
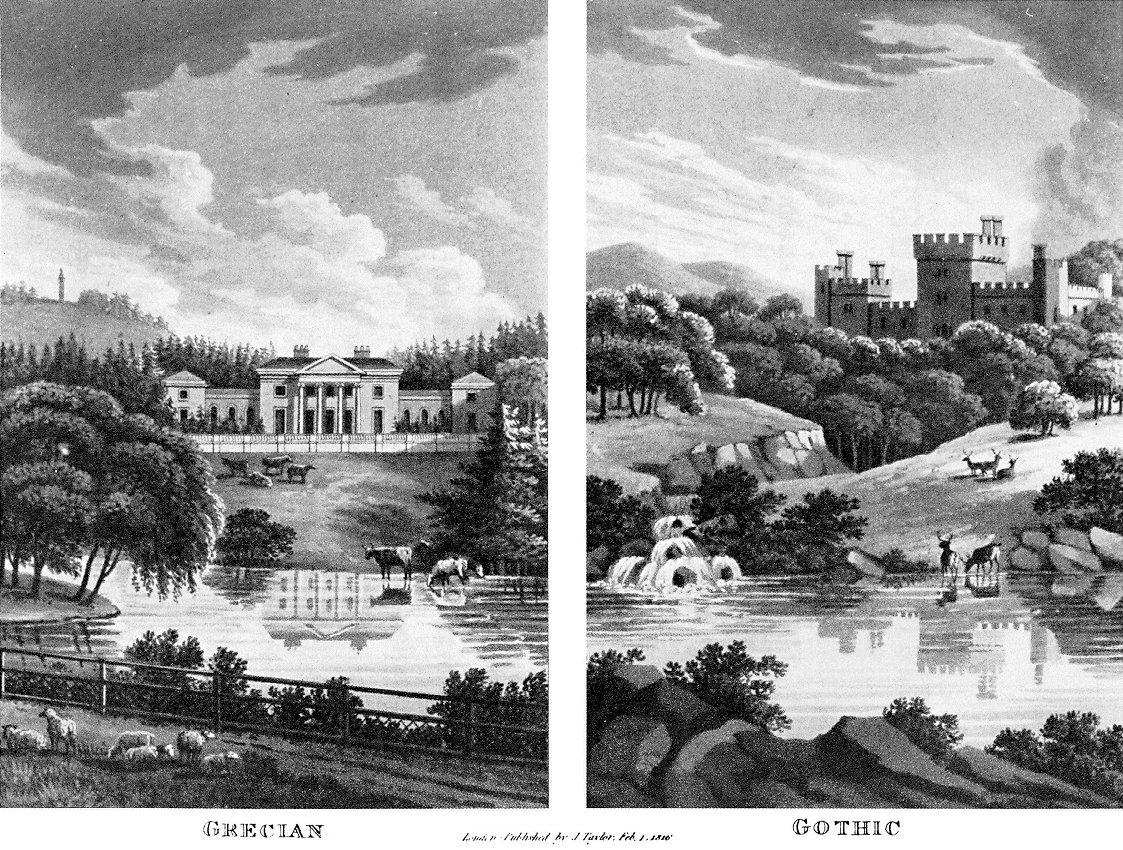
A print exemplifying the contrast between neoclassical vs. romantic styles of landscape and architecture (or the "Grecian" and the "Gothic" as they are termed here), 1816

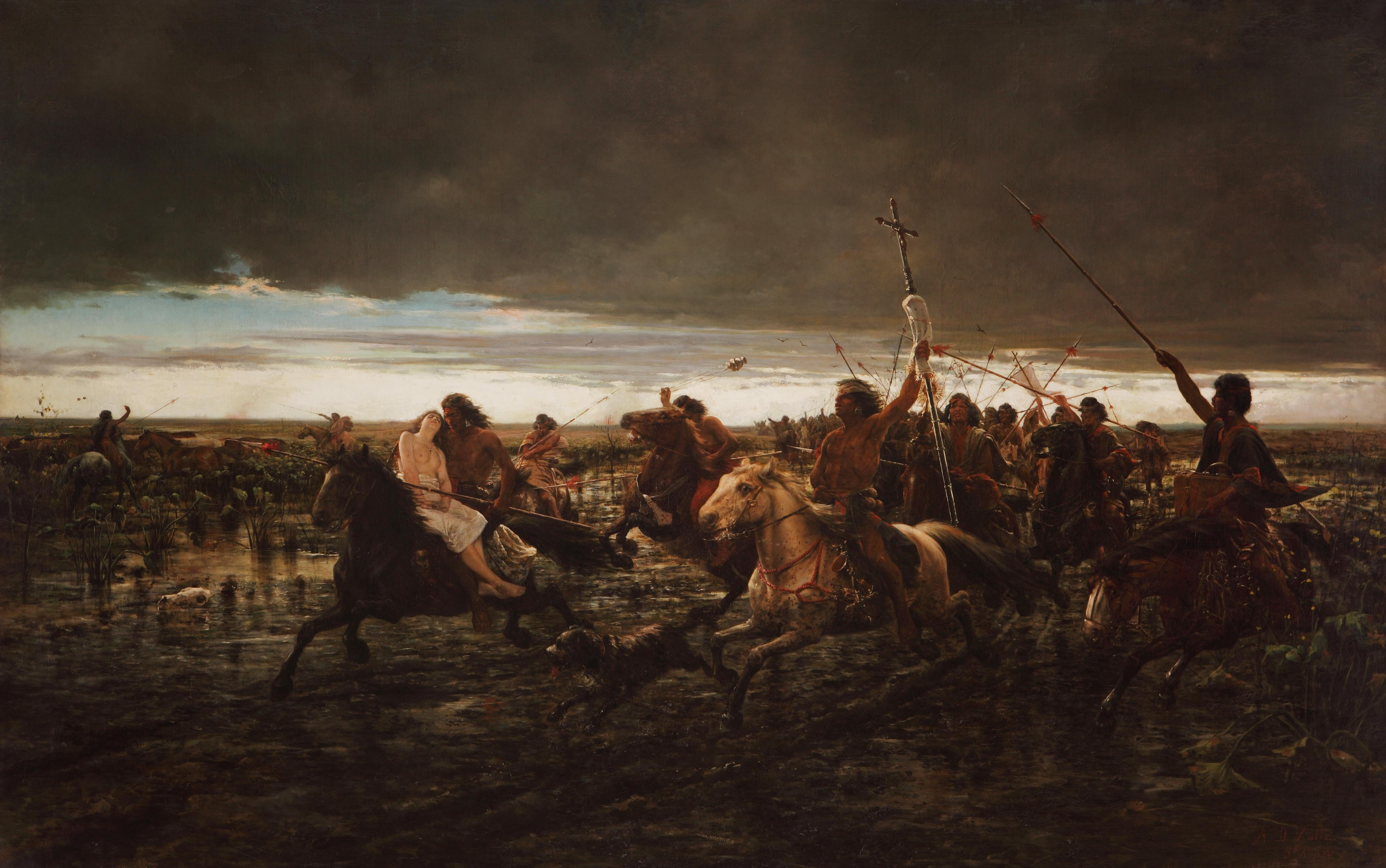
La vuelta del malón by Ángel Della Valle (1892)

Spanish-speaking South American Romanticism was influenced heavily by Esteban Echeverría, who wrote in the 1830s and 1840s. His writings were influenced by his hatred for the Argentine dictator Juan Manuel de Rosas, and filled with themes of blood and terror, using the metaphor of a slaughterhouse to portray the violence of Rosas' dictatorship.

Another important milestone in Argentine Romantic literature is Amalia by José Mármol, which is a love story set in the context of the Rosas' dictatorial regime.

Domingo Sarmiento, who would later become President of Argentina, published Facundo in 1845, a work of creative non-fiction, of considerable Romantic and positivist influence, in which he discussed the region's development, modernization, power and culture. Literary critic Roberto González Echeverría calls the work "the most important book written by a Latin American in any discipline or genre".

Brazilian Romanticism is characterized and divided in three different periods. The first period is focused on the creation of a sense of national identity, using the ideal of the heroic Indian. Some examples include José de Alencar, who wrote Iracema and O Guarani, and Gonçalves Dias, renowned by the poem "Canção do Exílio" (Song of the Exile). The second period, sometimes called Ultra-Romanticism, is marked by a profound influence of European themes and traditions, involving the melancholy, sadness and despair related to unobtainable love. Goethe and Lord Byron are commonly quoted in these works. Some of the most notable authors of this phase are Álvares de Azevedo, Casimiro de Abreu, Fagundes Varela and Junqueira Freire. The third period is marked by social poetry, especially the abolitionist movement, and it includes Castro Alves, Tobias Barreto and Pedro Luís Pereira de Sousa.

=== United States ===
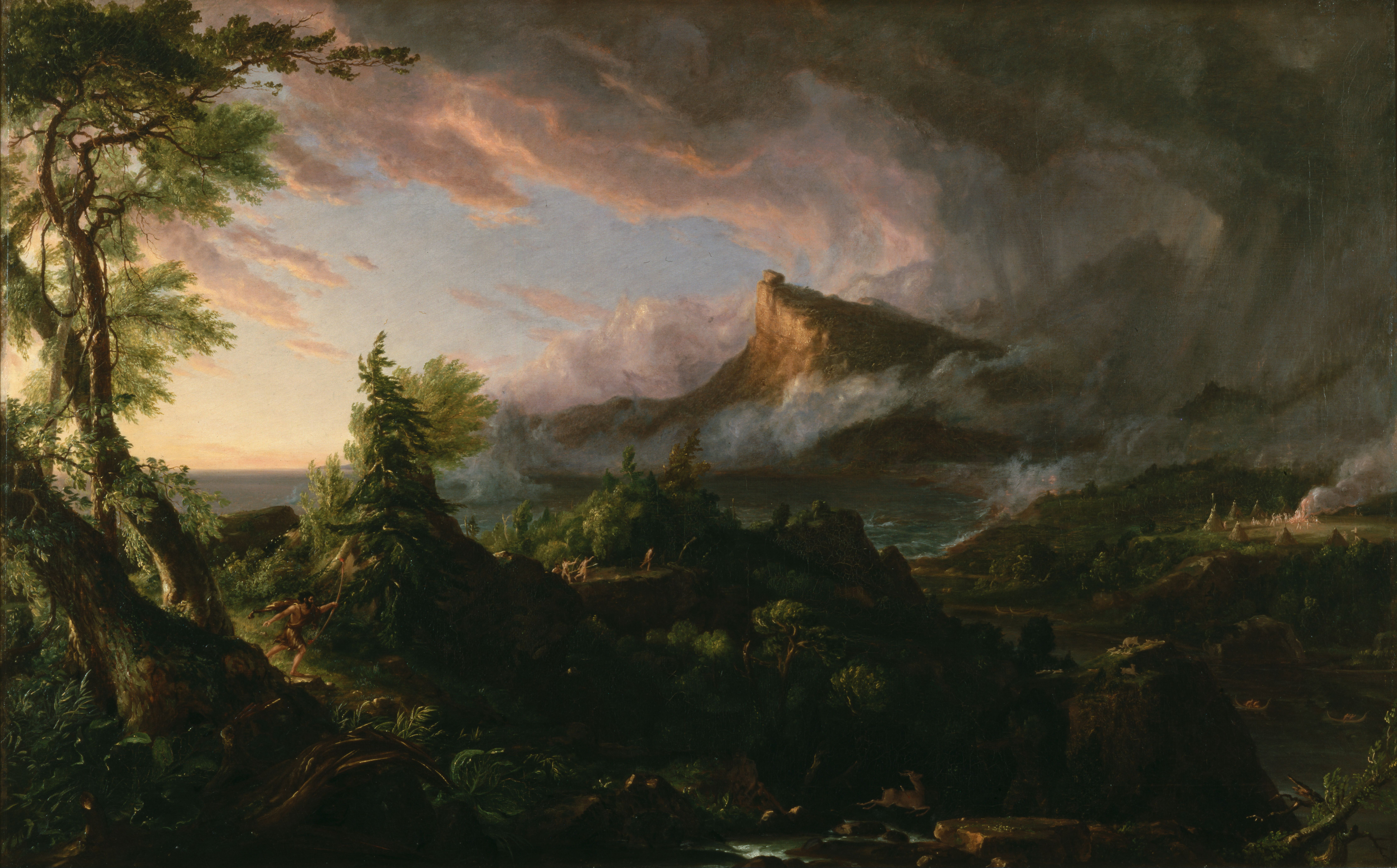
Thomas Cole, The Course of Empire: The Savage State (1 of 5), 1836

In the United States, at least by 1818 with William Cullen Bryant's "To a Waterfowl", Romantic poetry was being published. American Romantic Gothic literature made an early appearance with Washington Irving's "The Legend of Sleepy Hollow" (1820) and "Rip Van Winkle" (1819), followed from 1823 onwards by the Leatherstocking Tales of James Fenimore Cooper, with their emphasis on heroic simplicity and their fervent landscape descriptions of an already-exotic mythicized frontier peopled by "noble savages", similar to the philosophical theory of Rousseau, exemplified by Uncas, from The Last of the Mohicans. There are picturesque "local colour" elements in Washington Irving's essays and especially his travel books. Edgar Allan Poe's tales of the macabre and his balladic poetry were more influential in France than at home, but the romantic American novel developed fully with the atmosphere and drama of Nathaniel Hawthorne's The Scarlet Letter (1850). Later transcendentalist writers such as Henry David Thoreau and Ralph Waldo Emerson still show elements of its influence and imagination, as does the romantic realism of Walt Whitman. The poetry of Emily Dickinson—nearly unread in her own time—and Herman Melville's novel Moby-Dick can be taken as epitomes of American Romantic literature. By the 1880s, however, psychological and social realism were competing with Romanticism in the novel.

==== Influence of European Romanticism on American writers ====
The European Romantic movement reached America in the early 19th century. American Romanticism was just as multifaceted and individualistic as it was in Europe. Like the Europeans, the American Romantics demonstrated a high level of moral enthusiasm, commitment to individualism and the unfolding of the self, an emphasis on intuitive perception, and the assumption that the natural world was inherently good, while human society was filled with corruption.

Romanticism became popular in American politics, philosophy and art. The movement appealed to the revolutionary spirit of America as well as to those longing to break free of the strict religious traditions of early settlement. The Romantics rejected rationalism and religious intellect. It appealed to those in opposition of Calvinism, which includes the belief that the destiny of each individual is preordained. The Romantic movement gave rise to New England Transcendentalism, which portrayed a less restrictive relationship between God and Universe. The new philosophy presented the individual with a more personal relationship with God. Transcendentalism and Romanticism appealed to Americans in a similar fashion, for both privileged feeling over reason, individual freedom of expression over the restraints of tradition and custom. It often involved a rapturous response to nature. It encouraged the rejection of harsh, rigid Calvinism, and promised a new blossoming of American culture.

American Romanticism embraced the individual and rebelled against the confinement of neoclassicism and religious tradition. The Romantic movement in America created a new literary genre that continues to influence American writers. Novels, short stories, and poems replaced the sermons and manifestos of yore. Romantic literature was personal, intense, and portrayed more emotion than ever seen in neoclassical literature. America's preoccupation with freedom became a great source of motivation for Romantic writers as many were delighted in free expression and emotion without so much fear of ridicule and controversy. They also put more effort into the psychological development of their characters, and the main characters typically displayed extremes of sensitivity and excitement.

The works of the Romantic era also differed from preceding works in that they spoke to a wider audience, partly reflecting the greater distribution of books as costs came down during the period.

== Architecture ==
Romantic architecture appeared in the late 18th century in a reaction against the rigid forms of neoclassical architecture. Romantic architecture reached its peak in the mid-19th century, and continued to appear until the end of the 19th century. It was designed to evoke an emotional reaction, either respect for tradition or nostalgia for a bucolic past. It was frequently inspired by the architecture of the Middle Ages, especially Gothic architecture, it was strongly influenced by romanticism in literature, particularly the historical novels of Victor Hugo and Walter Scott. It sometimes moved into the domain of eclecticism, with features assembled from different historic periods and regions of the world.

Gothic Revival architecture was a popular variant of the romantic style, particularly in the construction of churches, Cathedrals, and university buildings. Notable examples include the completion of Cologne Cathedral in Germany, by Karl Friedrich Schinkel. The cathedral's construction began in 1248, but was halted in 1473. The original plans for the façade were discovered in 1840, and it was decided to recommence. Schinkel followed the original design as much as possible, but he also used modern construction technology, including an iron frame for the roof. The building was finished in 1880.

In Britain, notable examples include the Royal Pavilion in Brighton, a romantic version of traditional Indian architecture by John Nash (1815–1823), and the Houses of Parliament in London, built in a Gothic revival style by Charles Barry between 1840 and 1876.

In France, one of the earliest examples of romantic architecture is the Hameau de la Reine, the small rustic hamlet created at the Palace of Versailles for Queen Marie Antoinette between 1783 and 1785 by the royal architect Richard Mique with the help of the romantic painter Hubert Robert. It consisted of twelve structures, ten of which still exist, in the style of villages in Normandy. It was designed for the Queen and her friends to amuse themselves by playing at being peasants, and included a farmhouse with a dairy, a mill, a boudoir, a pigeon loft, a tower in the form of a lighthouse from which one could fish in the pond, a belvedere, a cascade and grotto, and a luxuriously furnished cottage with a billiard room for the Queen.

French romantic architecture in the 19th century was strongly influenced by two writers; Victor Hugo, whose novel The Hunchback of Notre Dame inspired a resurgence in interest in the Middle Ages; and Prosper Mérimée, who wrote celebrated romantic novels and short stories and was also the first head of the commission of Historic Monuments in France, responsible for publicizing and restoring (and sometimes romanticizing) many French cathedrals and monuments desecrated and ruined after the French Revolution. His projects were carried out by the architect Eugène Viollet-le-Duc. These included the restoration (sometimes creative) of the Cathedral of Notre Dame de Paris, the fortified city of Carcassonne, and the unfinished medieval Château de Pierrefonds.

The romantic style continued in the second half of the 19th century. The Palais Garnier, the Paris opera house designed by Charles Garnier was a highly romantic and eclectic combination of artistic styles. Another notable example of late 19th-century romanticism is the Basilica of Sacré-Cœur by Paul Abadie, who drew upon the model of Byzantine architecture for his elongated domes (1875–1914).

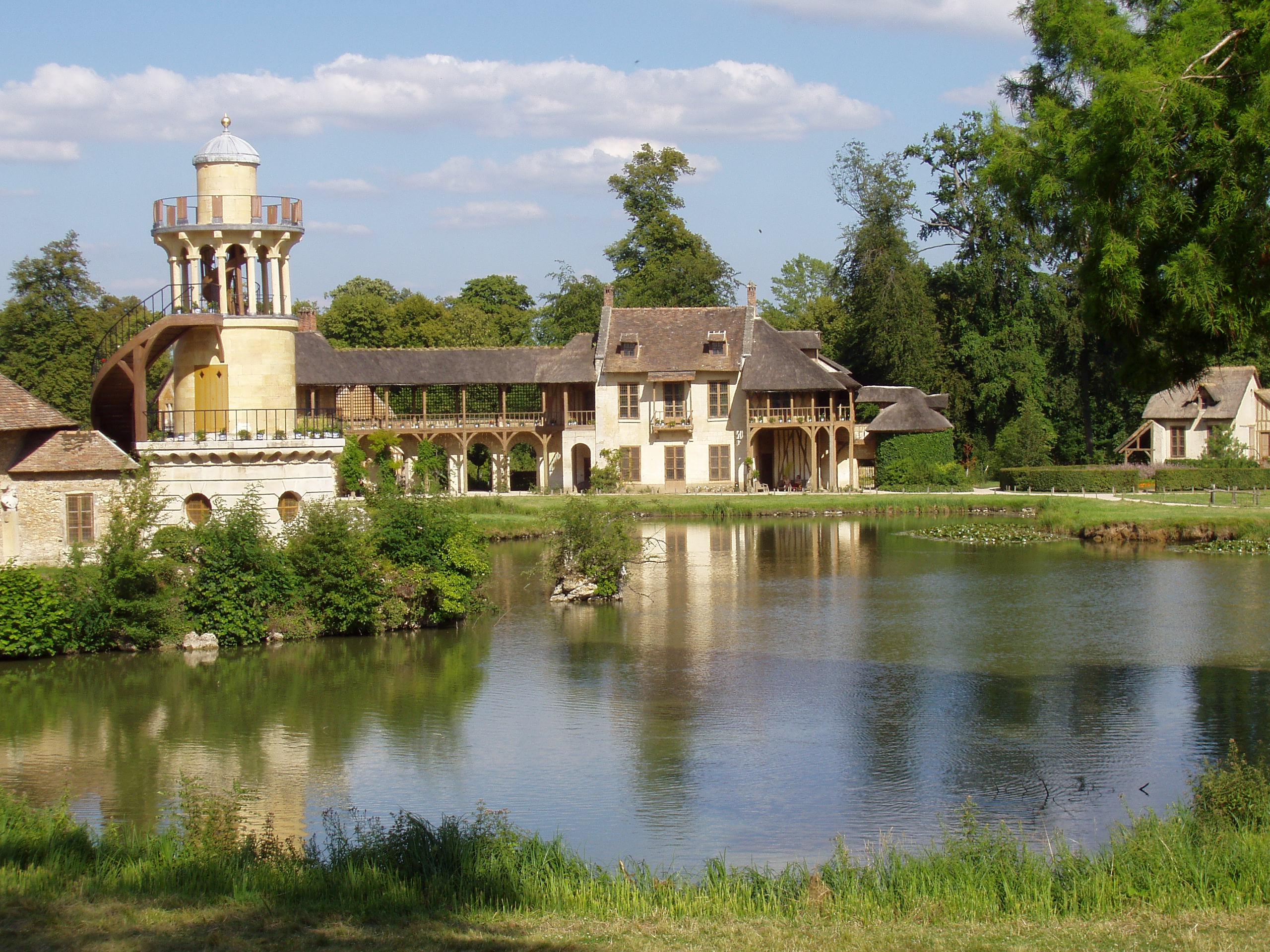
Hameau de la Reine, Palace of Versailles (1783–1785)

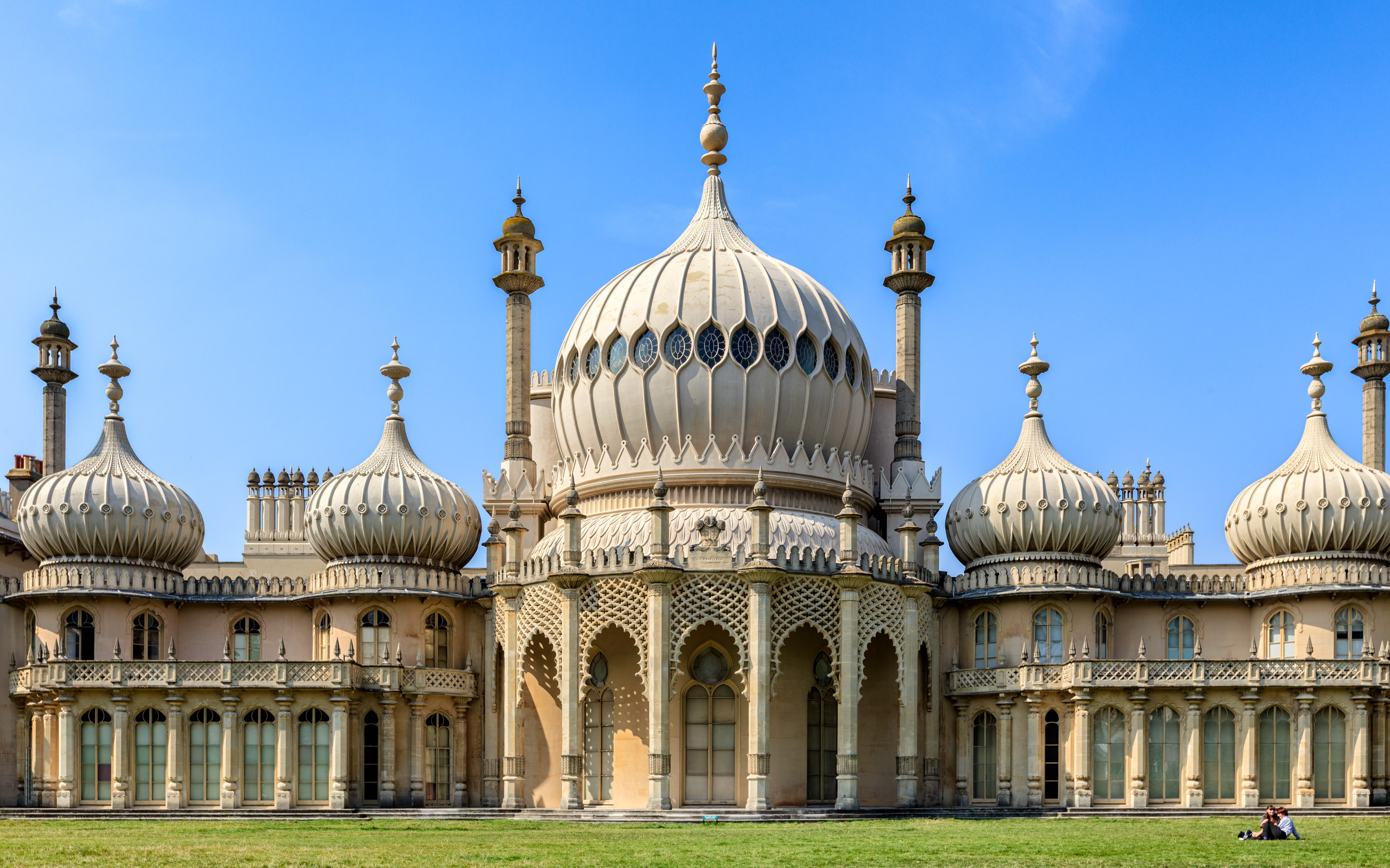
Royal Pavilion in Brighton by John Nash (1815–1823)

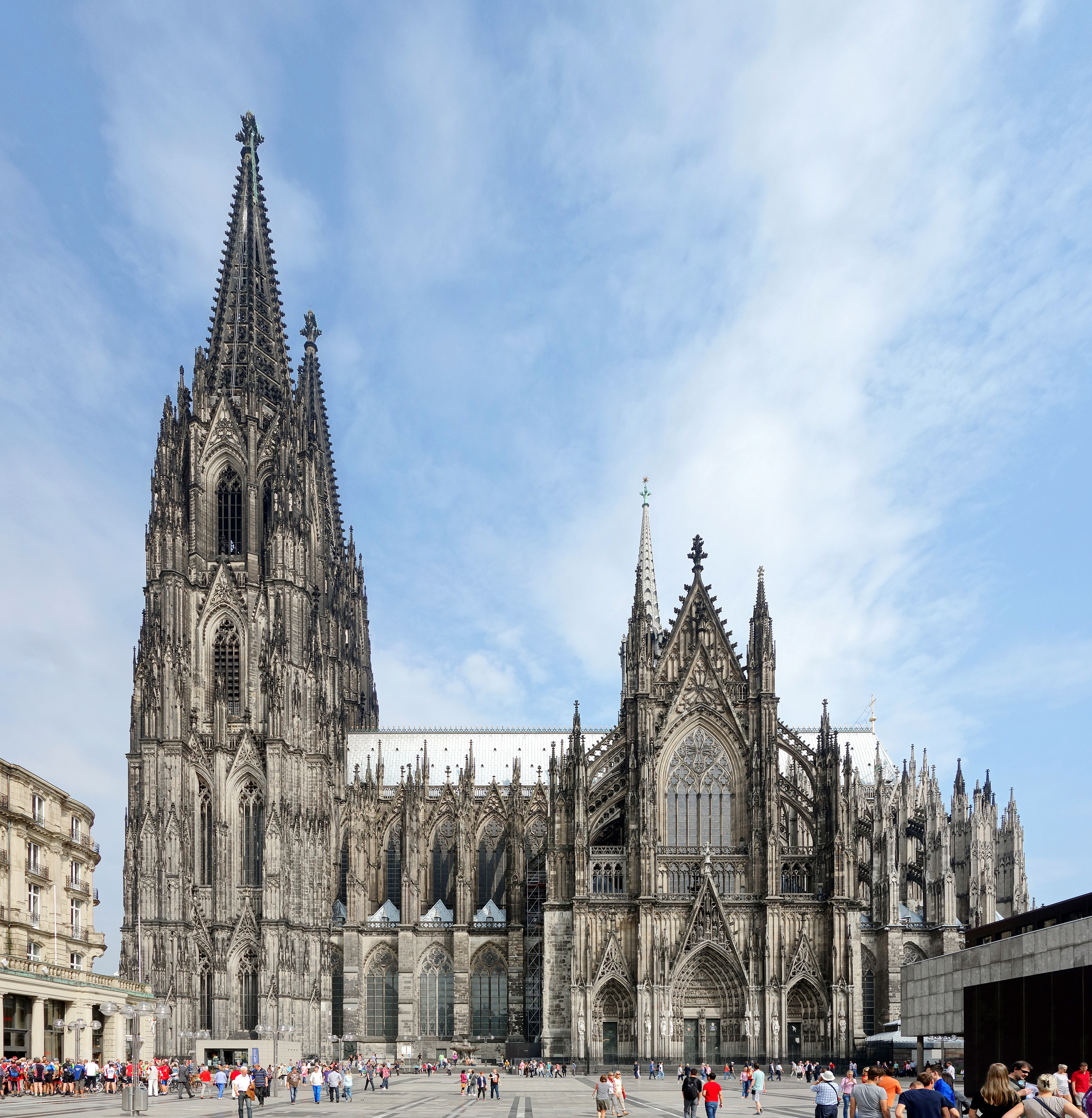
Cologne Cathedral (1840–1880)

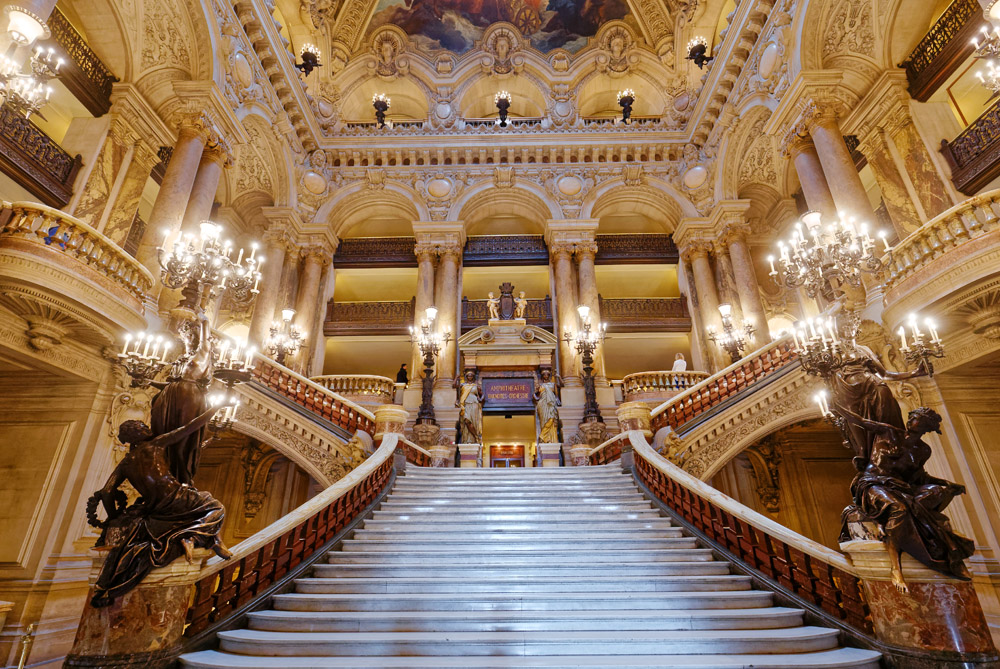
Grand Staircase of the Paris Opera by Charles Garnier (1861–1875)

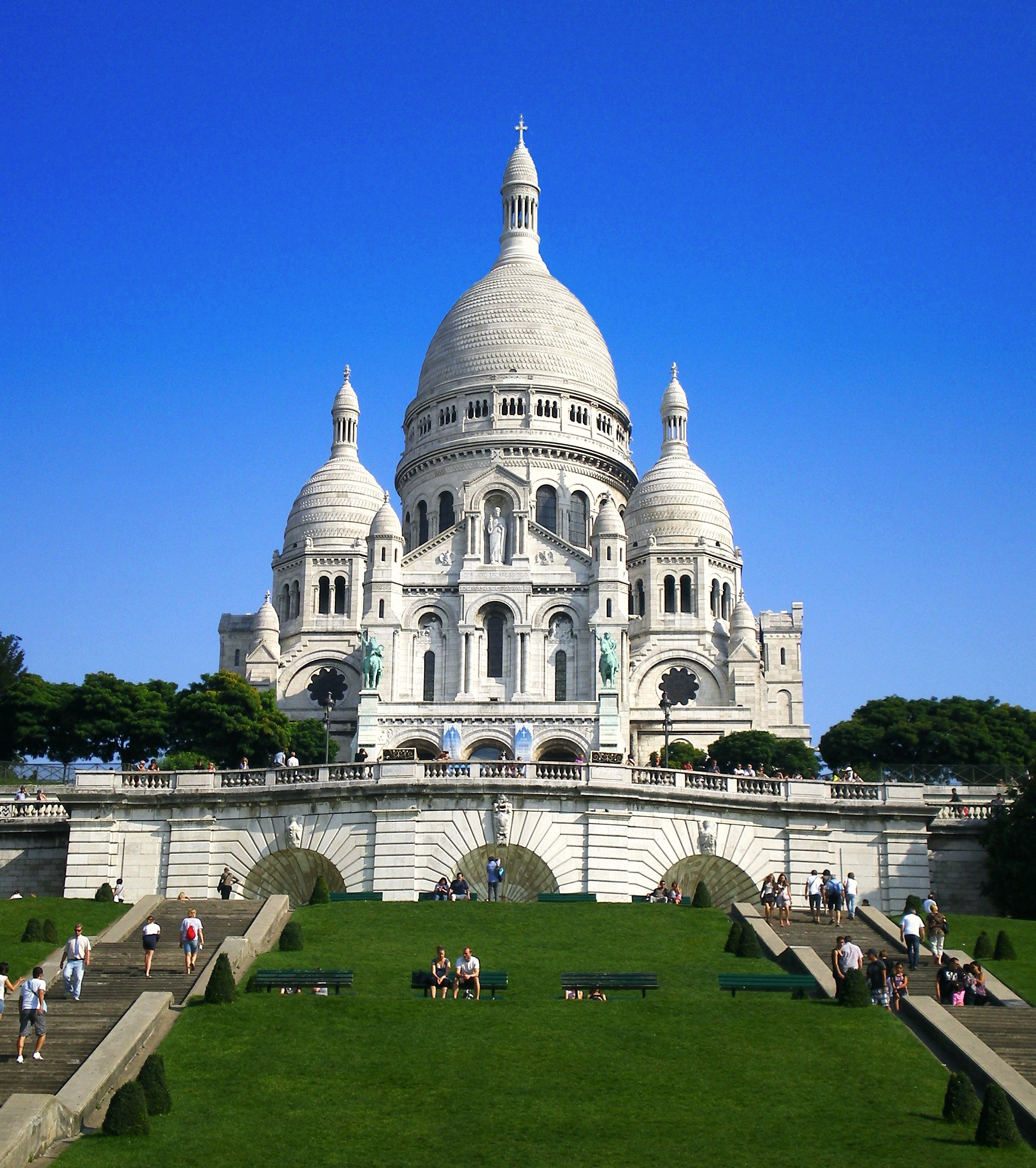
Basilica of Sacré-Cœur by Paul Abadie (1875–1914)

== Visual arts ==
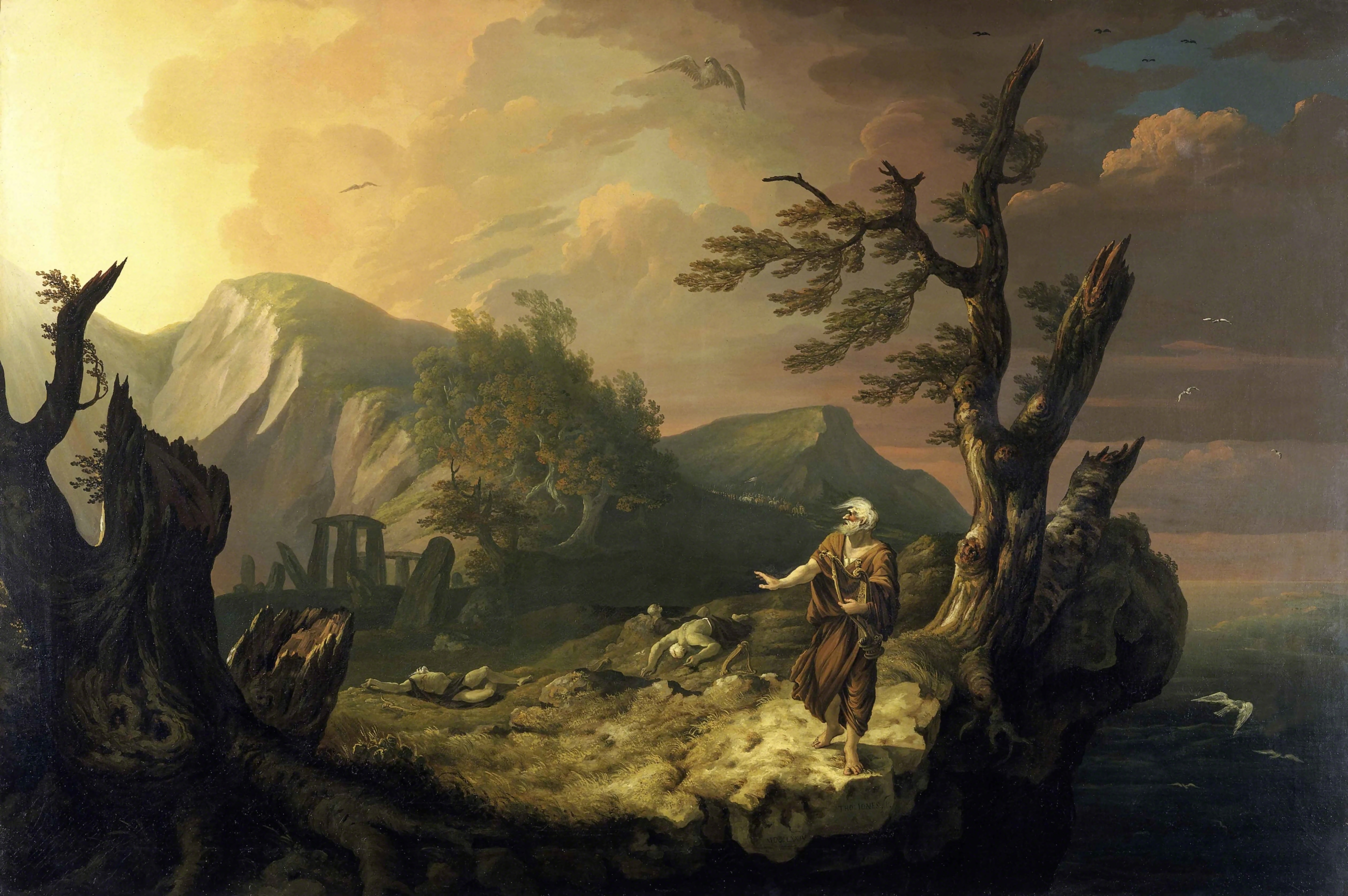
Thomas Jones, The Bard, 1774, a prophetic combination of Romanticism and nationalism by the Welsh artist

In the visual arts, Romanticism first showed itself in landscape painting, where from as early as the 1760s British artists began to turn to wilder landscapes and storms, and Gothic architecture. One of the most well known paintings of the era; The Bard by Thomas Jones uses Wales as a setting. Caspar David Friedrich and J. M. W. Turner were born less than a year apart in 1774 and 1775 respectively and were to take German and English landscape painting to their extremes of Romanticism, but both their artistic sensibilities were formed when forms of Romanticism was already strongly present in art. John Constable, born in 1776, stayed closer to the English landscape tradition, but in his largest "six-footers" insisted on the heroic status of a patch of the working countryside where he had grown up—challenging the traditional hierarchy of genres, which relegated landscape painting to a low status. Turner also painted very large landscapes, and above all, seascapes. Some of these large paintings had contemporary settings and staffage, but others had small figures that turned the work into history painting in the manner of Claude Lorrain, like Salvator Rosa, a late Baroque artist whose landscapes had elements that Romantic painters repeatedly turned to. Friedrich often used single figures, or features like crosses, set alone amidst a huge landscape, "making them images of the transitoriness of human life and the premonition of death".

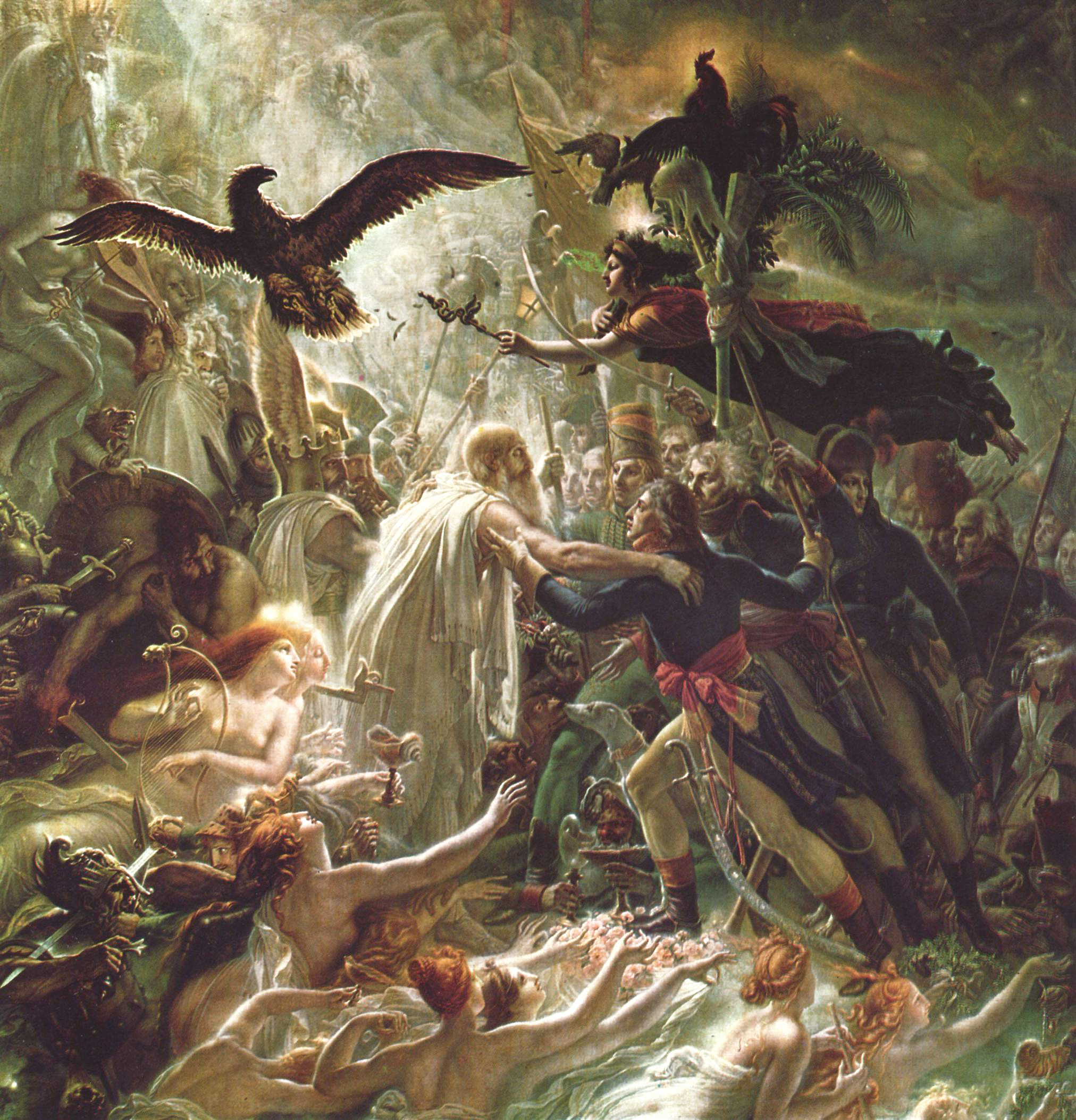
Anne-Louis Girodet de Roussy-Trioson, Ossian receiving the Ghosts of the French Heroes (1800–1802), Musée national de Malmaison et Bois-Préau, Château de Malmaison

Other groups of artists expressed feelings that verged on the mystical, many largely abandoning classical drawing and proportions. These included William Blake and Samuel Palmer and the other members of the Ancients in England, and in Germany Philipp Otto Runge. Like Friedrich, none of these artists had significant influence after their deaths for the rest of the 19th century, and were 20th-century rediscoveries from obscurity, though Blake was always known as a poet, and Norway's leading painter Johan Christian Dahl was heavily influenced by Friedrich. The Rome-based Nazarene movement of German artists, active from 1810, took a very different path, concentrating on medievalizing history paintings with religious and nationalist themes.

The arrival of Romanticism in French art was delayed by the strong hold of Neoclassicism on the academies, but from the Napoleonic period it became increasingly popular, initially in the form of history paintings propagandising for the new regime, of which Girodet's Ossian receiving the Ghosts of the French Heroes, for Napoleon's Château de Malmaison, was one of the earliest. Girodet's old teacher David was puzzled and disappointed by his pupil's direction, saying: "Either Girodet is mad or I no longer know anything of the art of painting". A new generation of the French school, developed personal Romantic styles, though still concentrating on history painting with a political message. Théodore Géricault (1791–1824) had his first success with The Charging Chasseur, a heroic military figure derived from Rubens, at the Paris Salon of 1812 in the years of the Empire, but his next major completed work, The Raft of the Medusa of 1818–19, remains the greatest achievement of the Romantic history painting, which in its day had a powerful anti-government message.

Eugène Delacroix (1798–1863) made his first Salon hits with The Barque of Dante (1822), The Massacre at Chios (1824) and Death of Sardanapalus (1827). The second was a scene from the Greek War of Independence, completed the year Byron died there, and the last was a scene from one of Byron's plays. With Shakespeare, Byron was to provide the subject matter for many other works of Delacroix, who also spent long periods in North Africa, painting colourful scenes of mounted Arab warriors. His Liberty Leading the People (1830) remains, with the Medusa, one of the best-known works of French Romantic painting. Both reflected current events, and increasingly "history painting", literally "story painting", a phrase dating back to the Italian Renaissance meaning the painting of subjects with groups of figures, long considered the highest and most difficult form of art, did indeed become the painting of historical scenes, rather than those from religion or mythology.

Francisco Goya was called "the last great painter in whose art thought and observation were balanced and combined to form a faultless unity". But the extent to which he was a Romantic is a complex question. In Spain, there was still a struggle to introduce the values of the Enlightenment, in which Goya saw himself as a participant. The demonic and anti-rational monsters thrown up by his imagination are only superficially similar to those of the Gothic fantasies of northern Europe, and in many ways he remained wedded to the classicism and realism of his training, as well as looking forward to the Realism of the later 19th century. But he, more than any other artist of the period, exemplified the Romantic values of the expression of the artist's feelings and his personal imaginative world. He also shared with many of the Romantic painters a more free handling of paint, emphasized in the new prominence of the brushstroke and impasto, which tended to be repressed in neoclassicism under a self-effacing finish.

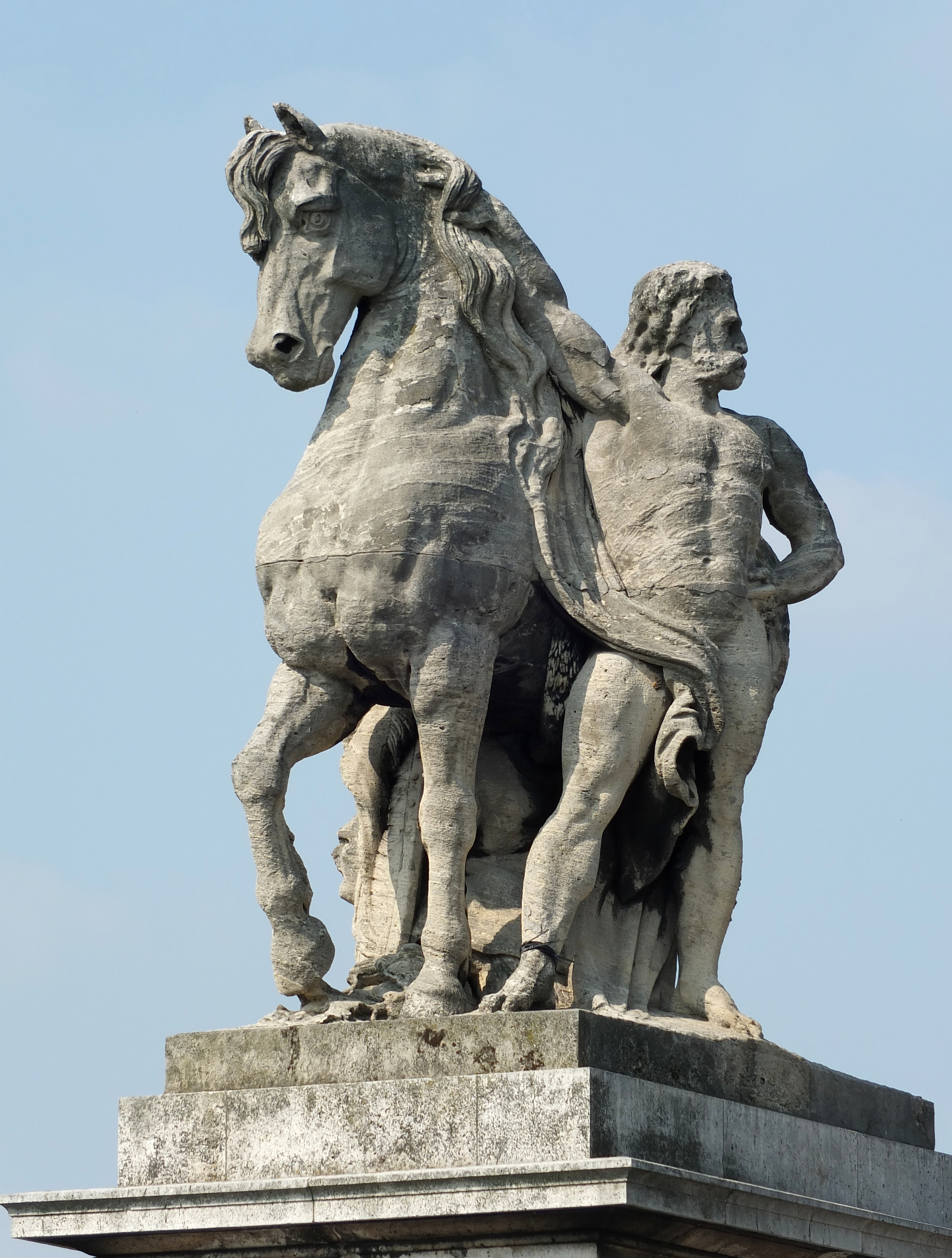
Cavalier gaulois by Antoine-Augustin Préault, Pont d'Iéna, Paris

Sculpture remained largely impervious to Romanticism, probably partly for technical reasons, as the most prestigious material of the day, marble, does not lend itself to expansive gestures. The leading sculptors in Europe, Antonio Canova and Bertel Thorvaldsen, were both based in Rome and firm Neoclassicists, not at all tempted to allow influence from medieval sculpture, which would have been one possible approach to Romantic sculpture. When it did develop, true Romantic sculpture—with the exception of a few artists such as Rudolf Maison—rather oddly was missing in Germany, and mainly found in France, with François Rude, best known from his group of the 1830s from the Arc de Triomphe in Paris, David d'Angers, and Auguste Préault. Préault's plaster relief entitled Slaughter, which represented the horrors of wars with exacerbated passion, caused so much scandal at the Salon of 1834 that Préault was banned from this official annual exhibition for nearly twenty years. In Italy, the most important Romantic sculptor was Lorenzo Bartolini.

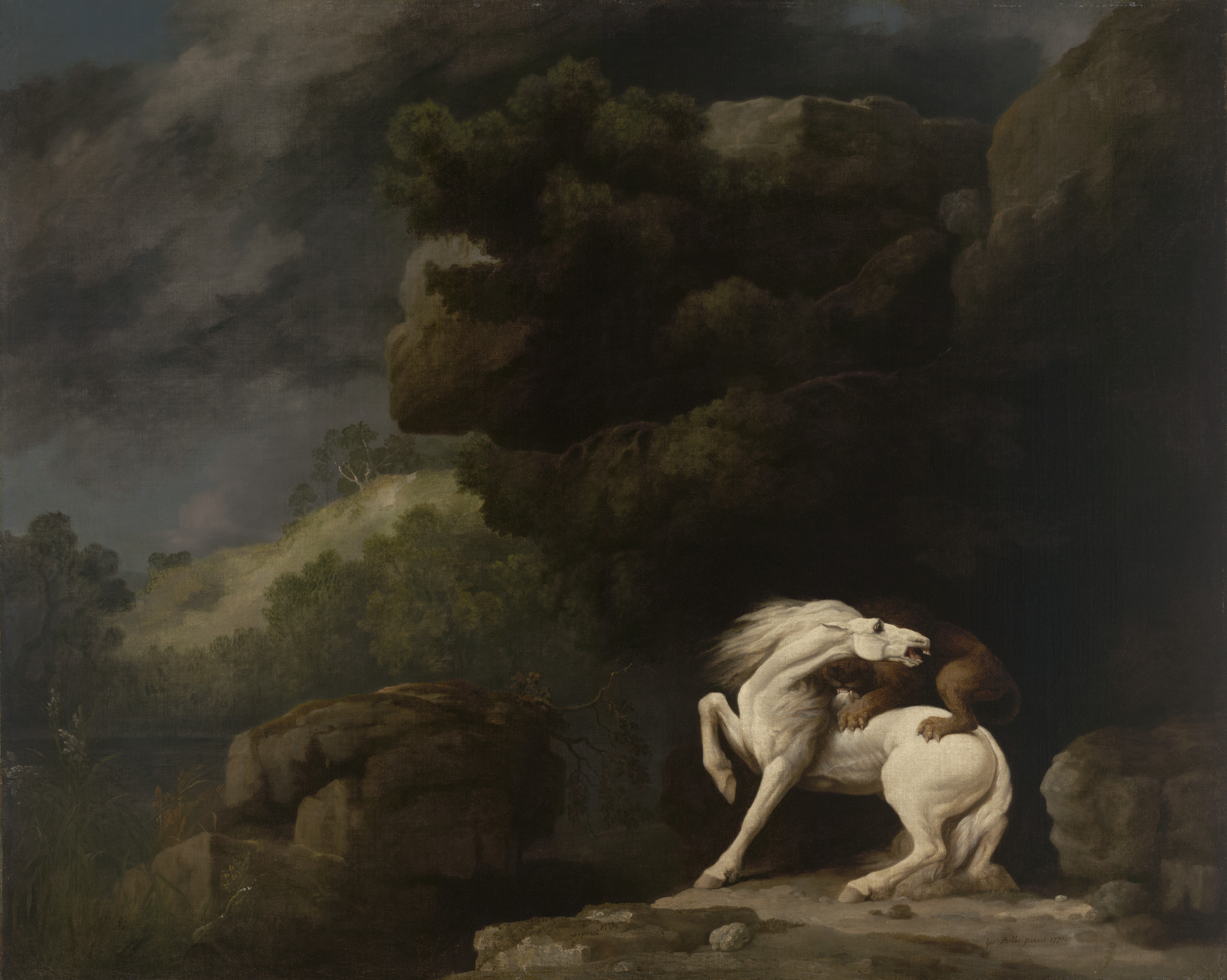
George Stubbs, A Lion Attacking a Horse (1770), oil on canvas, 38 in. x 49 1/2in., Yale Center for British Art

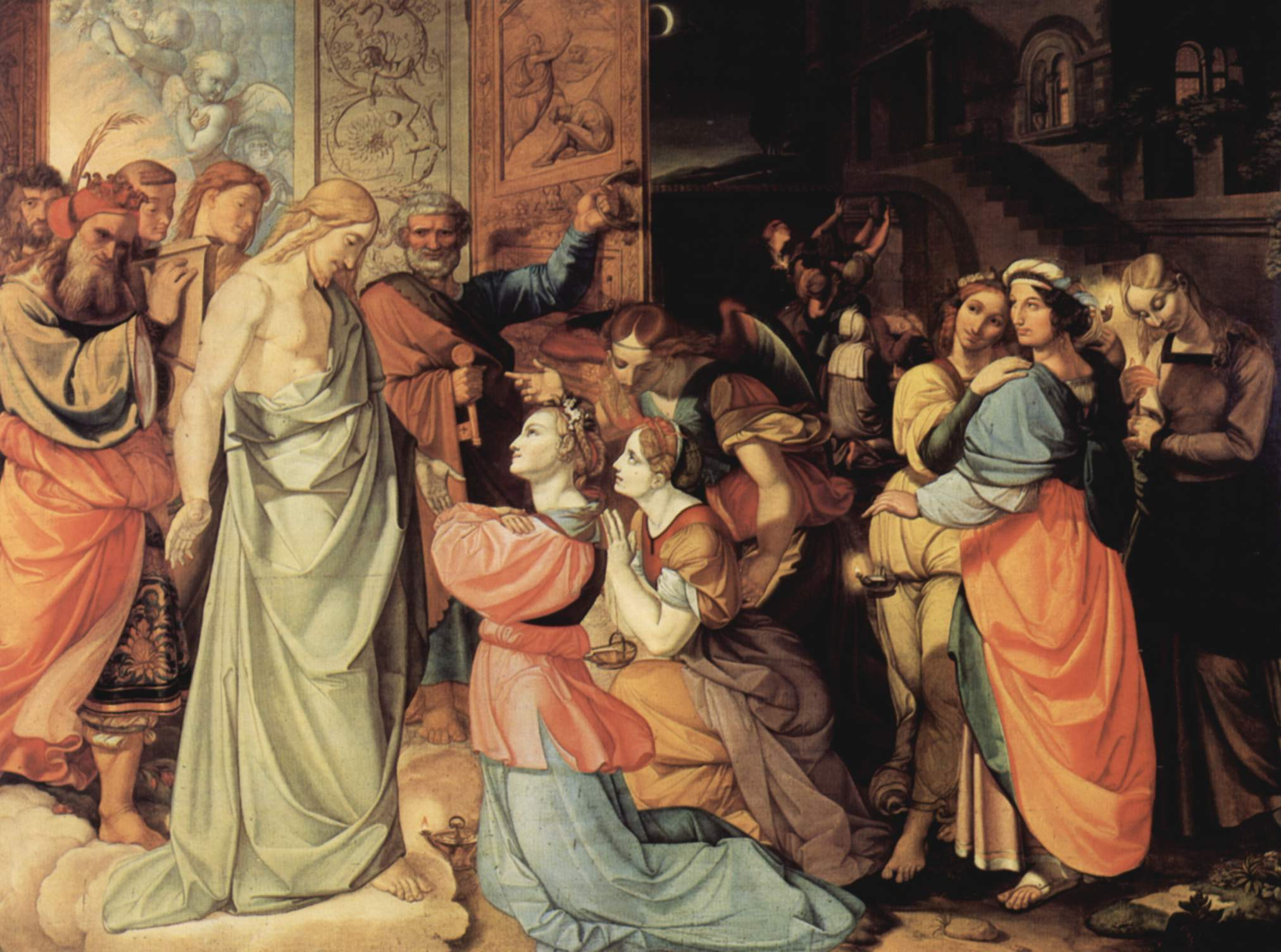
The Wise & Foolish Virgins by the Nazarene Peter von Cornelius, c. 1813

Francisco Goya, The Third of May 1808, 1814

Eugène Delacroix, Liberty Leading the People, 1830

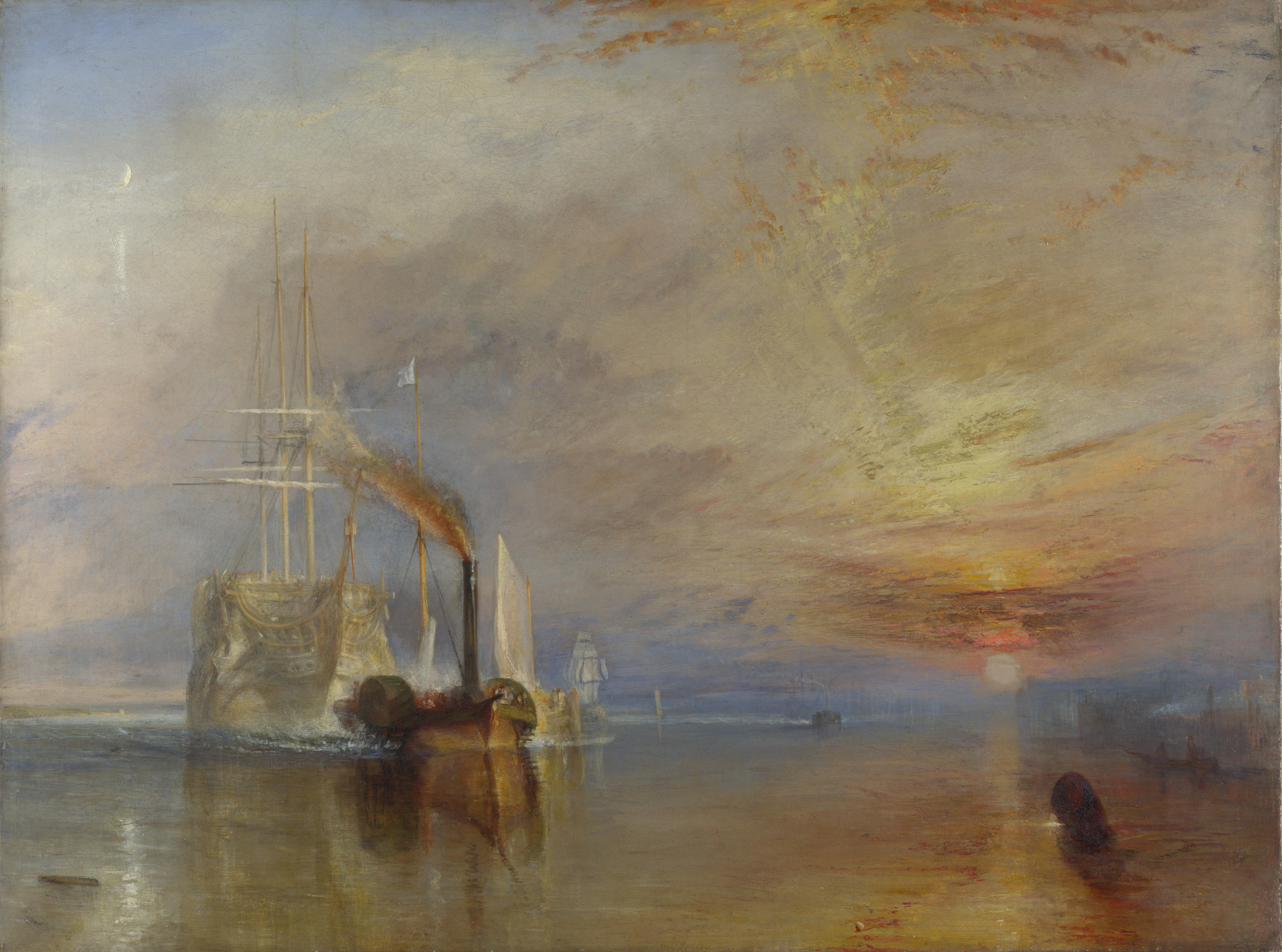
J. M. W. Turner, The Fighting Téméraire tugged to her last Berth to be broken up, 1839

In France, historical painting on idealized medieval and Renaissance themes is known as the style Troubadour, a term with no equivalent for other countries, though the same trends occurred there. Delacroix, Ingres and Richard Parkes Bonington all worked in this style, as did lesser specialists such as Pierre-Henri Révoil (1776–1842) and Fleury-François Richard (1777–1852). Their pictures are often small, and feature intimate private and anecdotal moments, as well as those of high drama. The lives of great artists such as Raphael were commemorated on equal terms with those of rulers, and fictional characters were also depicted. Fleury-Richard's Valentine of Milan weeping for the death of her husband, shown in the Paris Salon of 1802, marked the arrival of the style, which lasted until the mid-century, before being subsumed into the increasingly academic history painting of artists like Paul Delaroche.

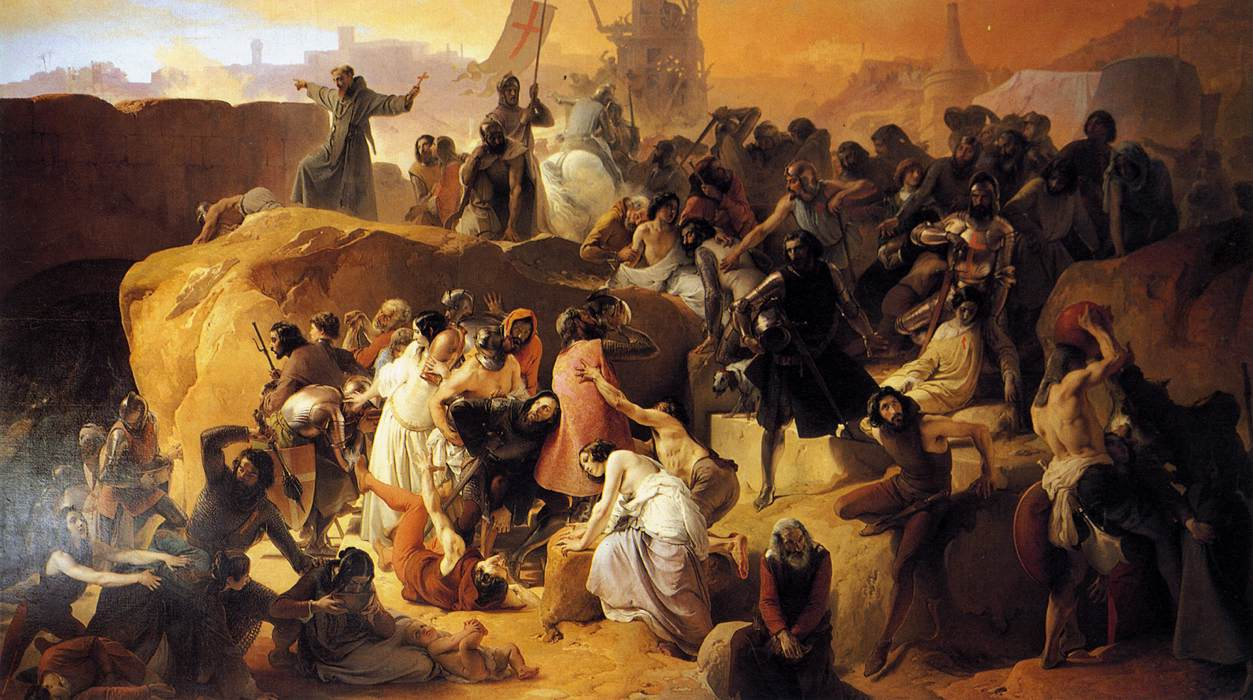
Francesco Hayez, Crusaders Thirsting near Jerusalem (1836–1850), Palazzo Reale, Turin

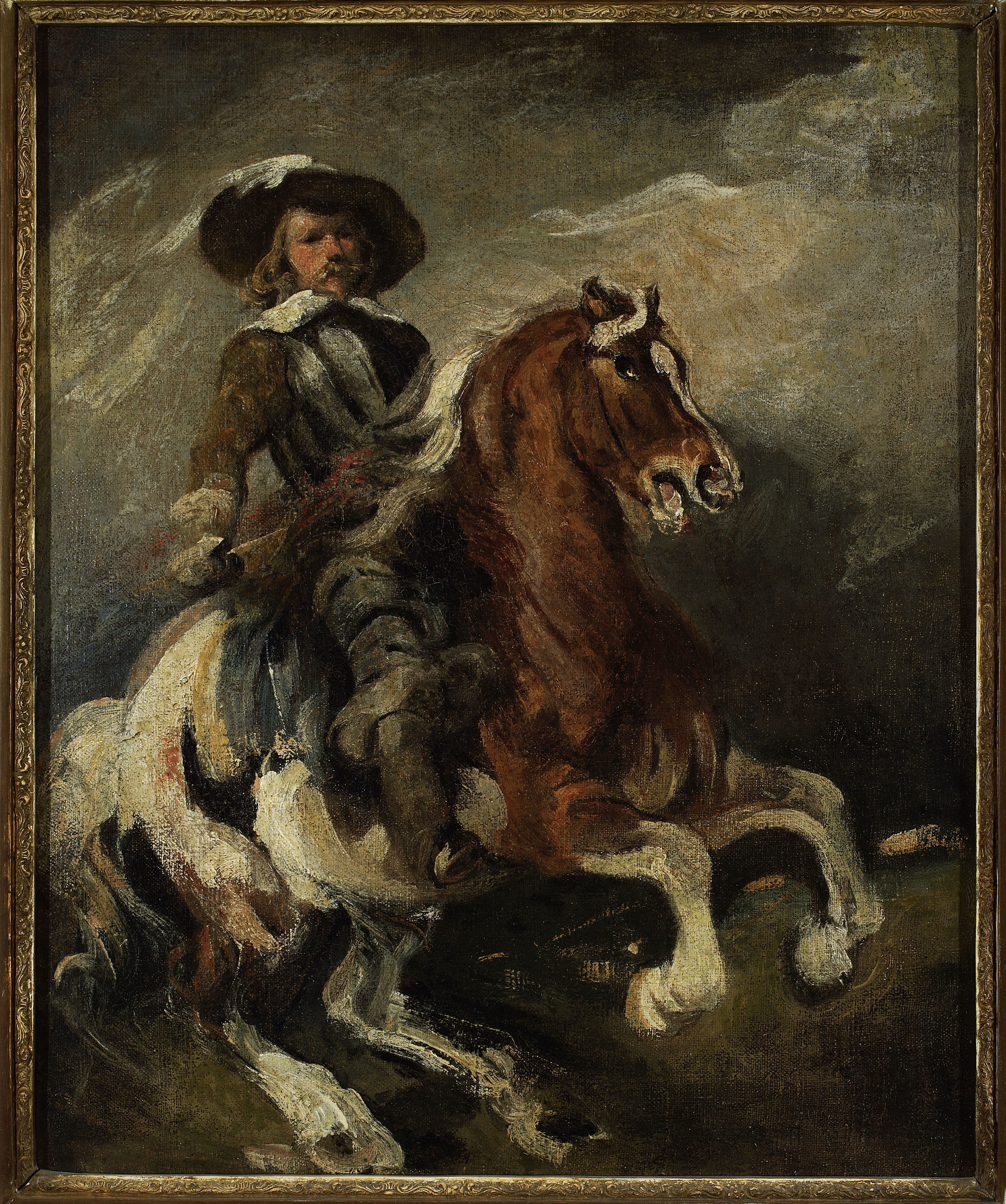
Piotr Michałowski, Reiter, c. 1840, National Museum in Warsaw

Another trend was for very large apocalyptic history paintings, often combining extreme natural events, or divine wrath, with human disaster, attempting to outdo The Raft of the Medusa, and now often drawing comparisons with effects from Hollywood. The leading English artist in the style was John Martin, whose tiny figures were dwarfed by enormous earthquakes and storms, and worked his way through the biblical disasters, and those to come in the final days. Other works such as Delacroix's Death of Sardanapalus included larger figures, and these often drew heavily on earlier artists, especially Poussin and Rubens, with extra emotionalism and special effects.

Elsewhere in Europe, leading artists adopted Romantic styles: in Russia there were the portraitists Orest Kiprensky and Vasily Tropinin, with Ivan Aivazovsky specializing in marine painting, and in Norway Hans Gude painted scenes of fjords. In Poland, Piotr Michałowski (1800–1855) used a Romantic style in paintings particularly relating to the history of Napoleonic Wars. In Italy Francesco Hayez (1791–1882) was the leading artist of Romanticism in mid-19th-century Milan. His long, prolific and extremely successful career saw him begin as a Neoclassical painter, pass right through the Romantic period, and emerge at the other end as a sentimental painter of young women. His Romantic period included many historical pieces of "Troubadour" tendencies, but on a very large scale, that are heavily influenced by Gian Battista Tiepolo and other late Baroque Italian masters.

Literary Romanticism had its counterpart in the American visual arts, most especially in the exaltation of an untamed American landscape found in the paintings of the Hudson River School. Painters like Thomas Cole, Albert Bierstadt and Frederic Edwin Church and others often expressed Romantic themes in their paintings. They sometimes depicted ancient ruins of the old world, such as in Fredric Edwin Church's piece Sunrise in Syria. These works reflected the Gothic feelings of death and decay. They also show the Romantic ideal that Nature is powerful and will eventually overcome the transient creations of men. More often, they worked to distinguish themselves from their European counterparts by depicting uniquely American scenes and landscapes. This idea of an American identity in the art world is reflected in W. C. Bryant's poem To Cole, the Painter, Departing for Europe, where Bryant encourages Cole to remember the powerful scenes that can only be found in America.

Some American paintings (such as Albert Bierstadt's The Rocky Mountains, Lander's Peak) promote the literary idea of the "noble savage" by portraying idealized Native Americans living in harmony with the natural world. Thomas Cole's paintings tend towards allegory, explicit in The Voyage of Life series painted in the early 1840s, showing the stages of life set amidst an awesome and immense nature.

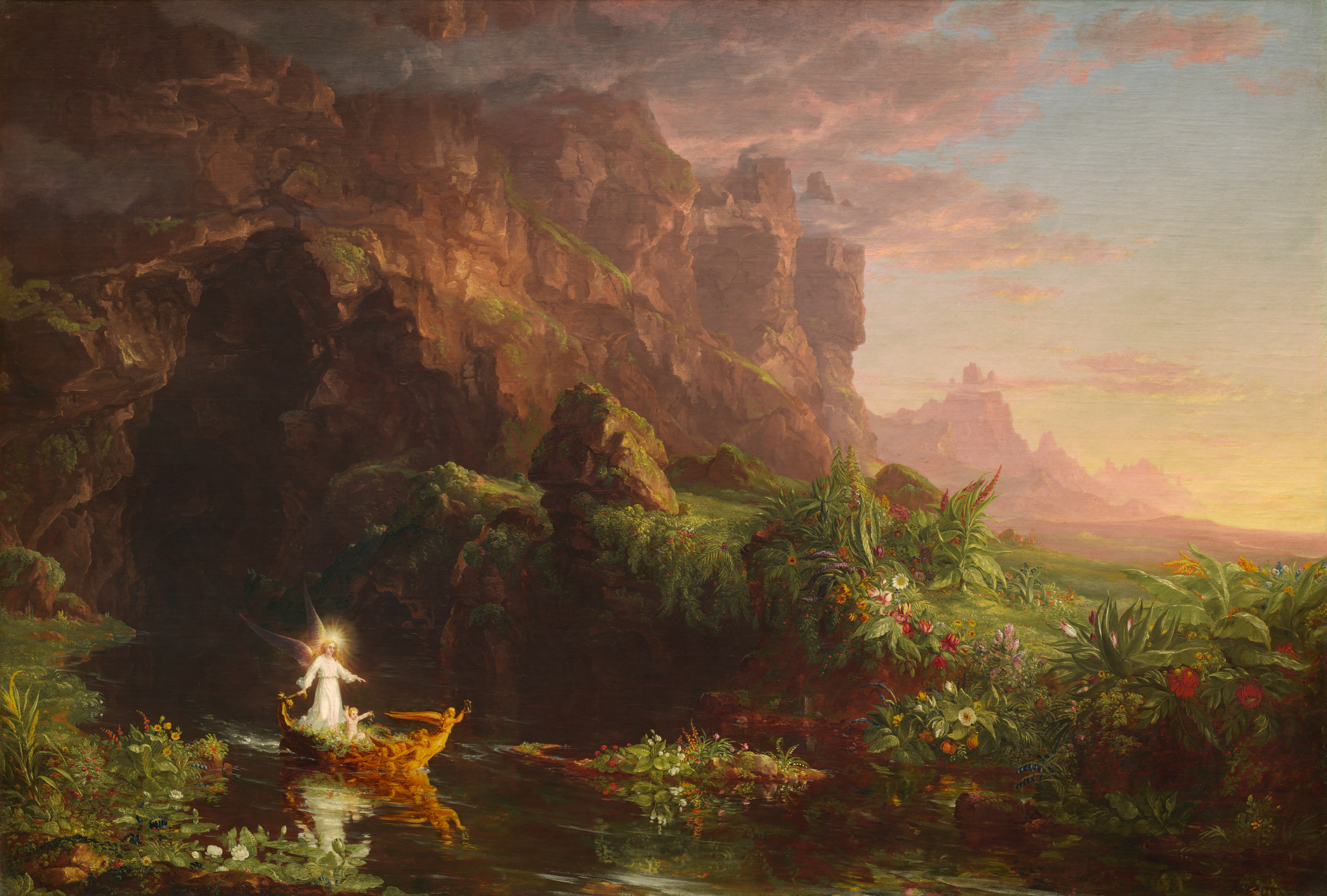
Thomas Cole, Childhood (1842), one of the four scenes in The Voyage of Life

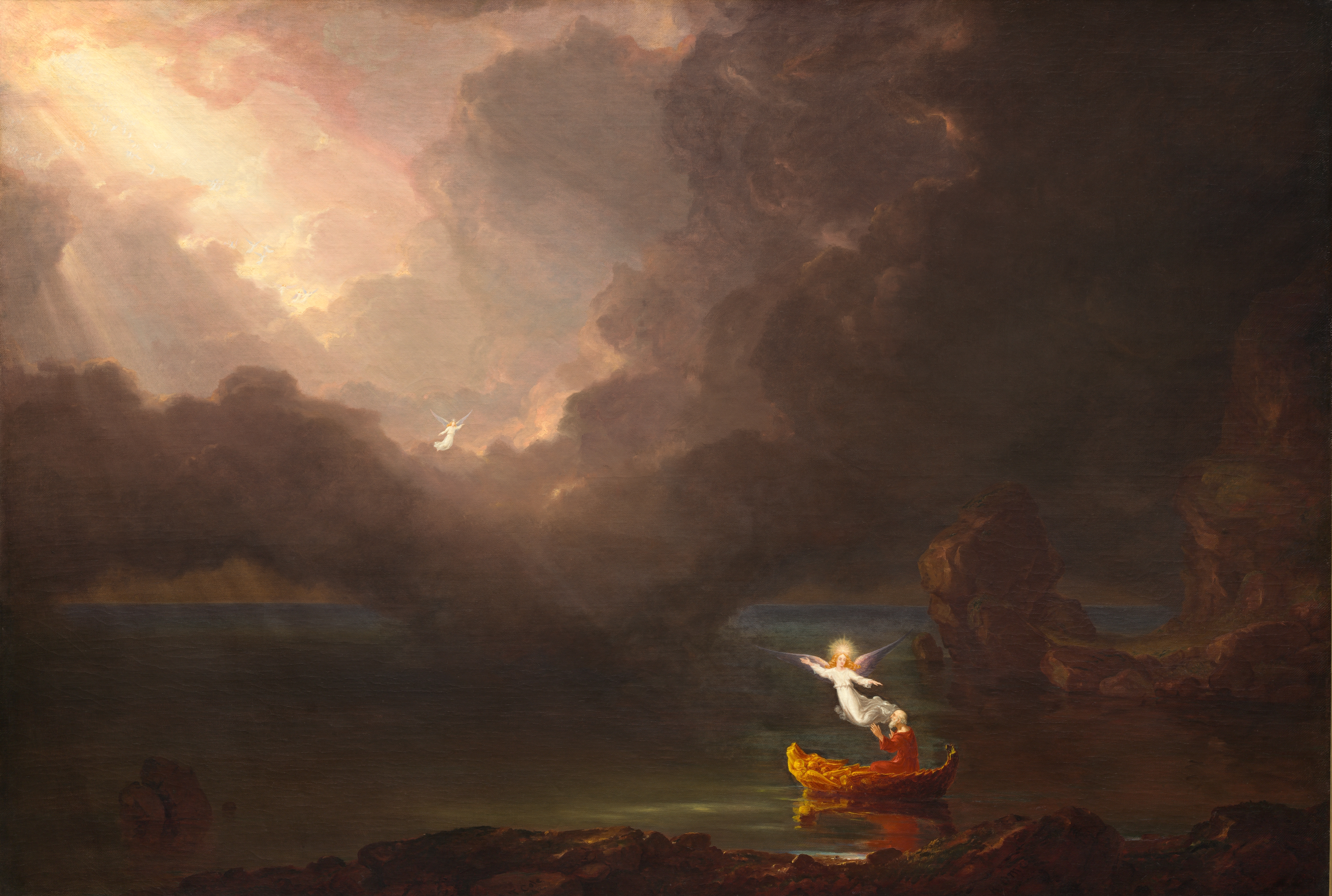
Thomas Cole, The Voyage of Life
Old Age (1842)

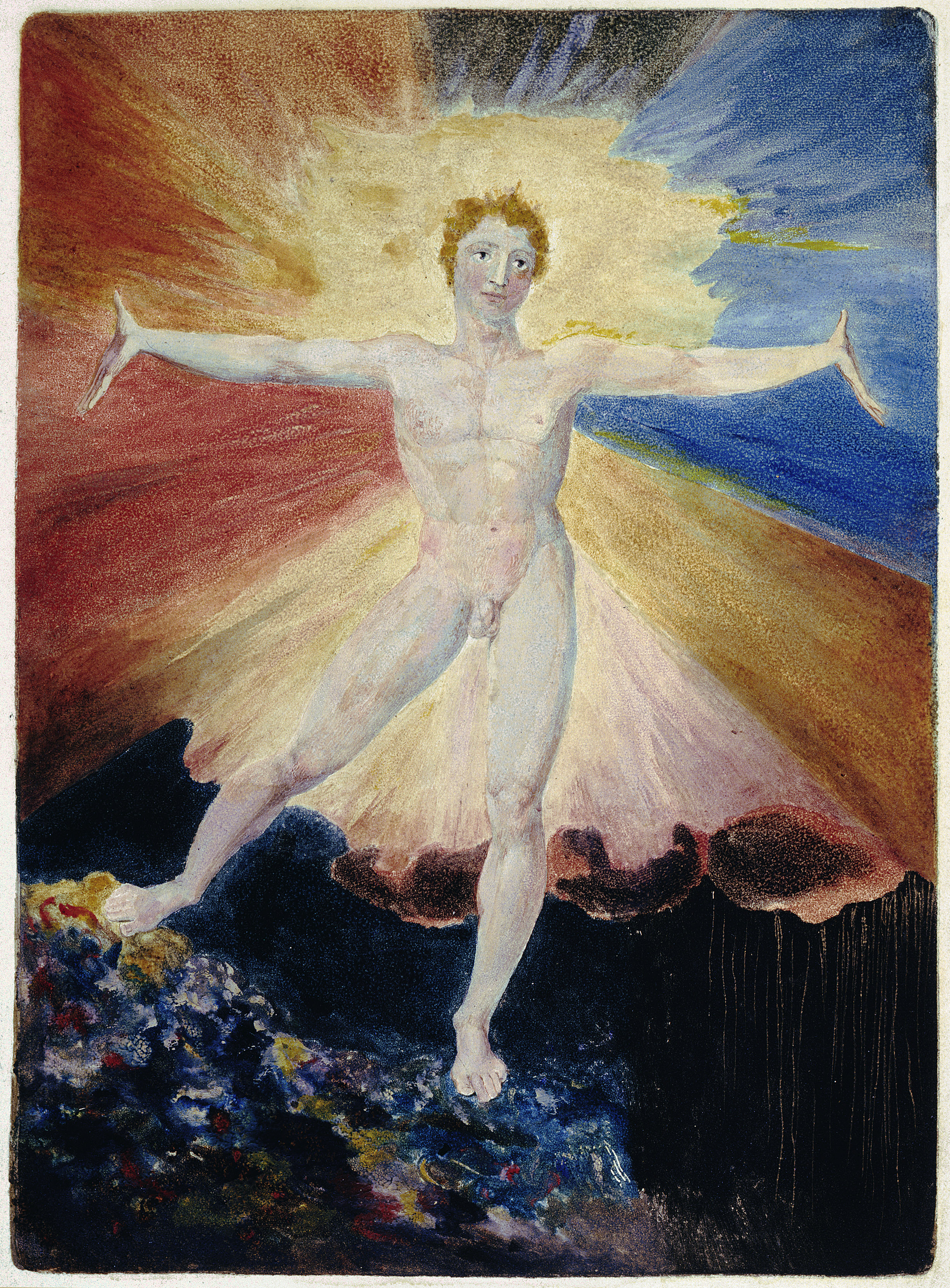
William Blake, Albion Rose, 1794–1795

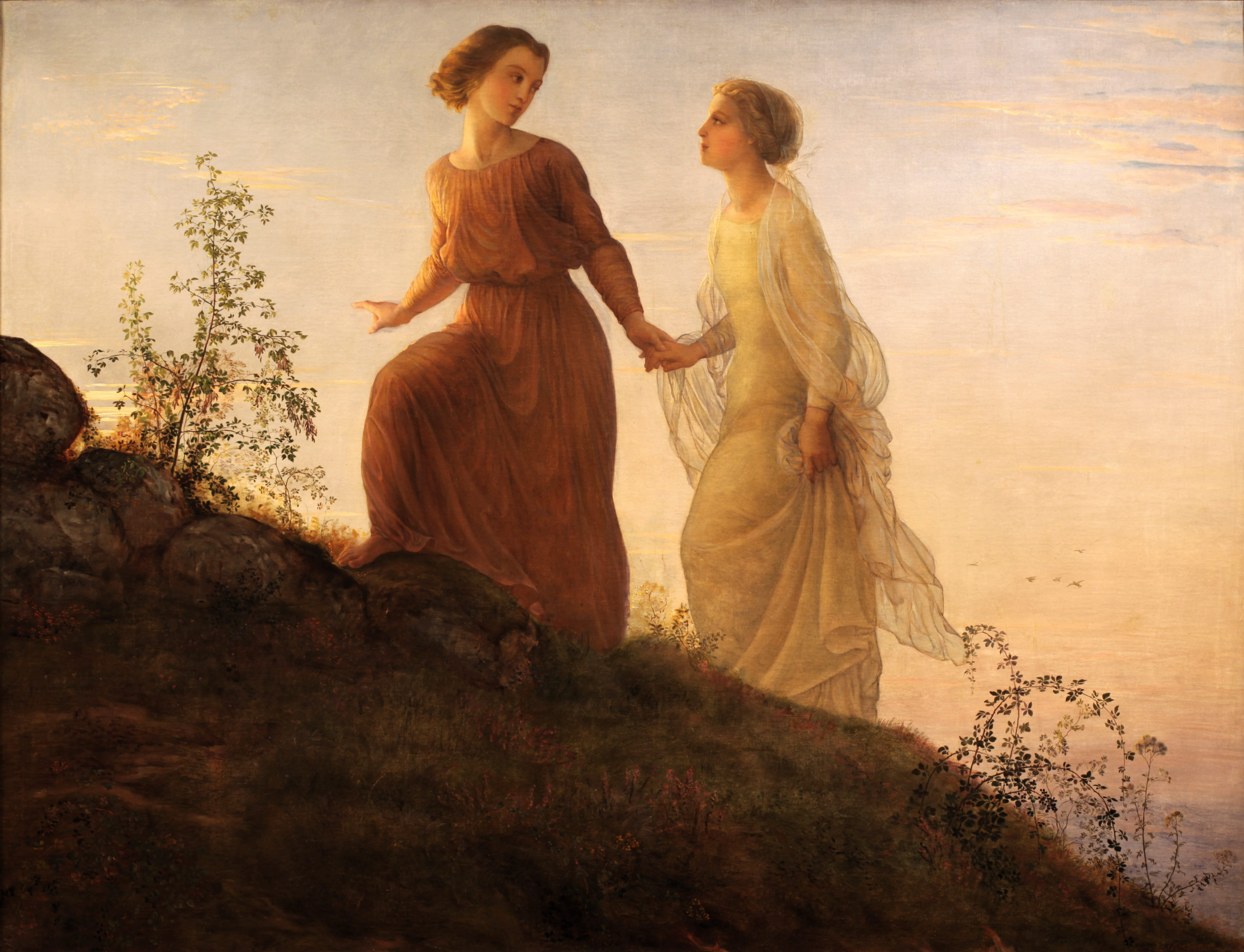
Louis Janmot, from his series The Poem of the Soul, before 1854

== Music ==
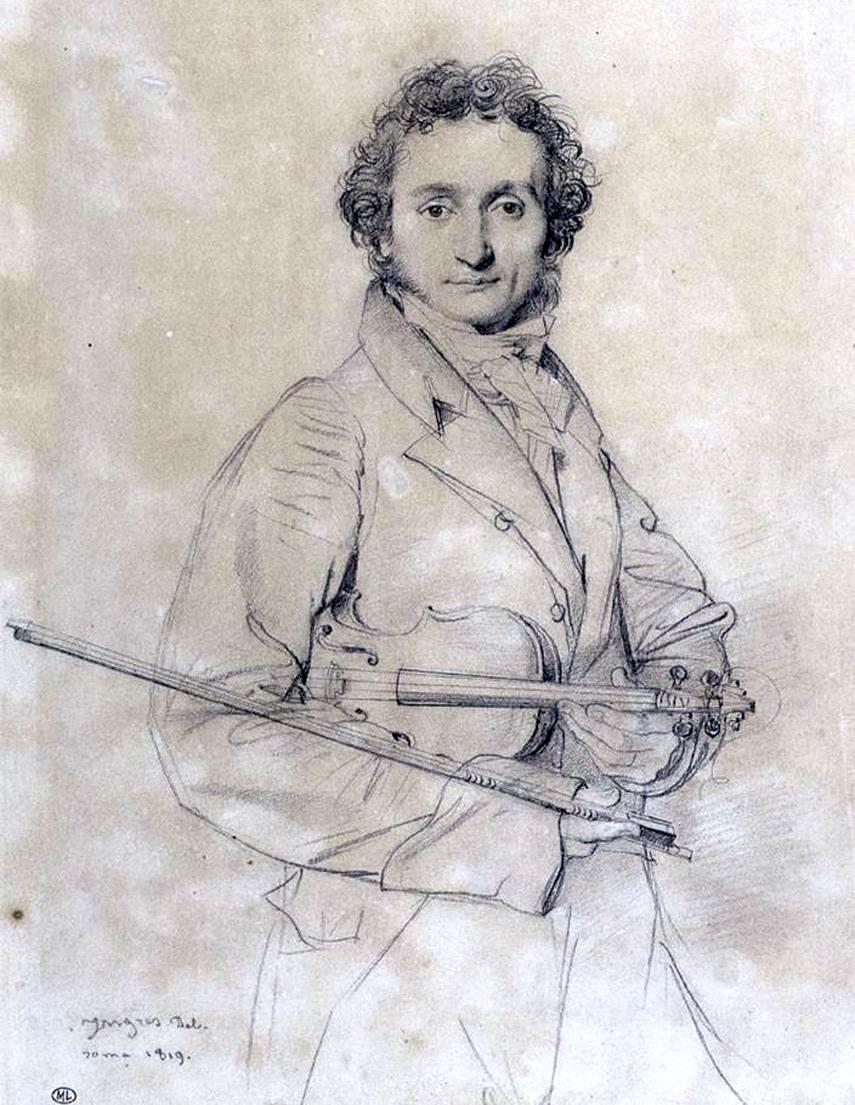
Jean-Auguste-Dominique Ingres, Portrait of Niccolò Paganini, 1819

The term "Romanticism" when applied to music has come to imply the period roughly from 1800 until 1850, or else until around 1900. Musical Romanticism is predominantly a German phenomenon—so much so that one respected French reference work defines it entirely in terms of "The role of music in the aesthetics of German romanticism". Another French encyclopedia holds that the German temperament generally "can be described as the deep and diverse action of romanticism on German musicians", and that there is only one true representative of Romanticism in French music, Hector Berlioz, while in Italy, the sole great name of musical Romanticism is Giuseppe Verdi, "a sort of [Victor] Hugo of opera, gifted with a real genius for dramatic effect". Similarly, in his analysis of Romanticism and its pursuit of harmony, Henri Lefebvre posits that, "But of course, German romanticism was more closely linked to music than French romanticism was, so it is there we should look for the direct expression of harmony as the central romantic idea." Nevertheless, the huge popularity of German Romantic music led, "whether by imitation or by reaction", to an often nationalistically inspired vogue amongst Polish, Hungarian, Russian, Czech, and Scandinavian musicians, successful "perhaps more because of its extra-musical traits than for the actual value of musical works by its masters".

In the contemporary music culture, the romantic musician followed a public career depending on sensitive middle-class audiences rather than on a courtly patron, as had been the case with earlier musicians and composers. Public persona characterized a new generation of virtuosi who made their way as soloists, epitomized in the concert tours of Paganini and Liszt, and the conductor began to emerge as an important figure, on whose skill the interpretation of the increasingly complex music depended.

=== Evolution of the term in musicology ===
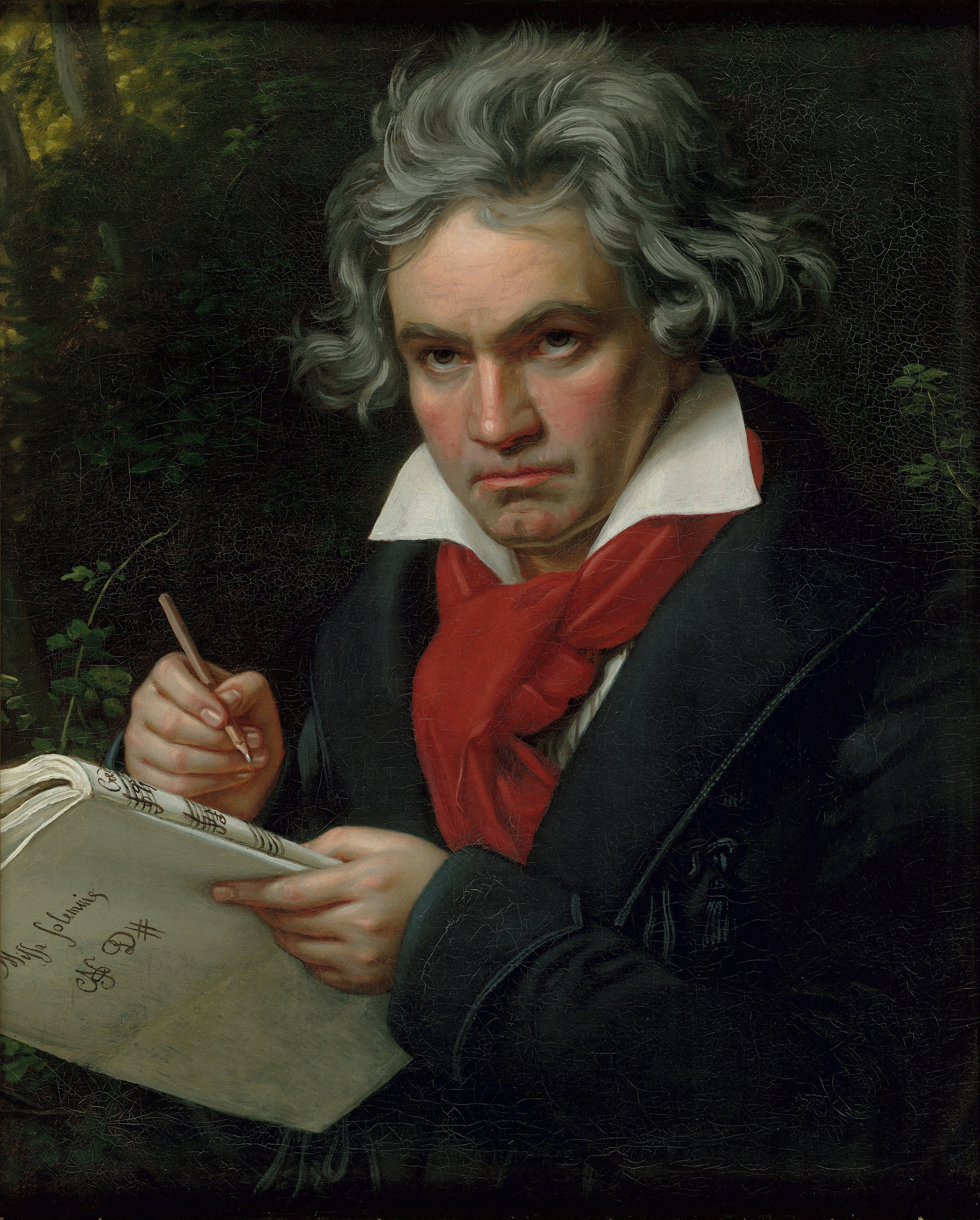
Ludwig van Beethoven, 1820

Although the term "Romanticism" when applied to music has come to imply the period roughly from 1800 until 1850, or else until around 1900, the contemporary application of "romantic" to music did not coincide with this modern interpretation. Indeed, one of the earliest sustained applications of the term to music occurs in 1789, in the Mémoires of André Grétry. This is of particular interest because it is a French source on a subject mainly dominated by Germans, but also because it explicitly acknowledges its debt to Jean-Jacques Rousseau (himself a composer, amongst other things) and, by so doing, establishes a link to one of the major influences on the Romantic movement generally. In 1810 E. T. A. Hoffmann named Haydn, Mozart, and Beethoven as "the three masters of instrumental compositions" who "breathe one and the same romantic spirit". He justified his view on the basis of these composers' depth of evocative expression and their marked individuality. In Haydn's music, according to Hoffmann, "a child-like, serene disposition prevails", while Mozart (in the late E-flat major Symphony, for example) "leads us into the depths of the spiritual world", with elements of fear, love, and sorrow, "a presentiment of the infinite ... in the eternal dance of the spheres". Beethoven's music, on the other hand, conveys a sense of "the monstrous and immeasurable", with the pain of an endless longing that "will burst our breasts in a fully coherent concord of all the passions". This elevation in the valuation of pure emotion resulted in the promotion of music from the subordinate position it had held in relation to the verbal and plastic arts during the Enlightenment. Because music was considered to be free of the constraints of reason, imagery, or any other precise concept, it came to be regarded, first in the writings of Wackenroder and Tieck and later by writers such as Schelling and Wagner, as preeminent among the arts, the one best able to express the secrets of the universe, to evoke the spirit world, infinity, and the absolute.

This chronologic agreement of musical and literary Romanticism continued as far as the middle of the 19th century, when Richard Wagner denigrated the music of Meyerbeer and Berlioz as "neoromantic": "The Opera, to which we shall now return, has swallowed down the Neoromanticism of Berlioz, too, as a plump, fine-flavoured oyster, whose digestion has conferred on it anew a brisk and well-to-do appearance."

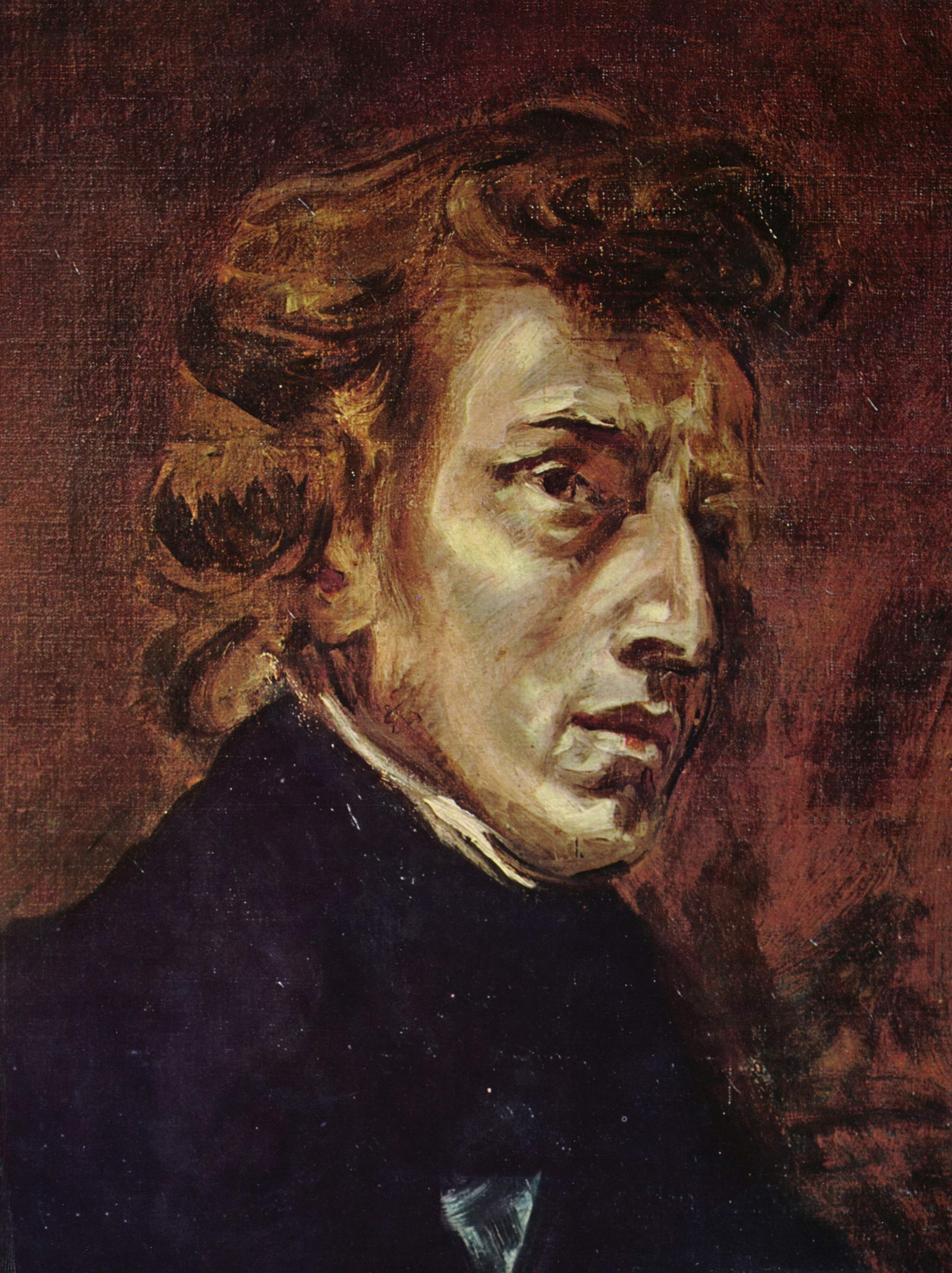
Frédéric Chopin in 1838 by Eugène Delacroix

It was only toward the end of the 19th century that the newly emergent discipline of Musikwissenschaft (musicology)—itself a product of the historicizing proclivity of the age—attempted a more scientific periodization of music history, and a distinction between Viennese Classical and Romantic periods was proposed. The key figure in this trend was Guido Adler, who viewed Beethoven and Franz Schubert as transitional but essentially Classical composers, with Romanticism achieving full maturity only in the post-Beethoven generation of Frédéric Chopin, Felix Mendelssohn, Robert Schumann, Hector Berlioz and Franz Liszt. From Adler's viewpoint, found in books like Der Stil in der Musik (1911), composers of the New German School and various late-19th-century nationalist composers were not Romantics but "moderns" or "realists" (by analogy with the fields of painting and literature), and this schema remained prevalent through the first decades of the 20th century.

By the second quarter of the 20th century, an awareness that radical changes in musical syntax had occurred during the early 1900s caused another shift in historical viewpoint, and the change of century came to be seen as marking a decisive break with the musical past. This in turn led historians such as Alfred Einstein to extend the musical "Romantic era" throughout the 19th century and into the first decade of the 20th. It has continued to be referred to as such in some of the standard music references such as The Oxford Companion to Music and Grout's History of Western Music but was not unchallenged. For example, the prominent German musicologist Friedrich Blume, the chief editor of the first edition of Die Musik in Geschichte und Gegenwart (1949–86), accepted the earlier position that Classicism and Romanticism together constitute a single period beginning in the middle of the 18th century, but at the same time held that it continued into the 20th century, including such pre-World War II developments as expressionism and neoclassicism. This is reflected in some notable recent reference works such as the New Grove Dictionary of Music and Musicians and the new edition of Musik in Geschichte und Gegenwart.

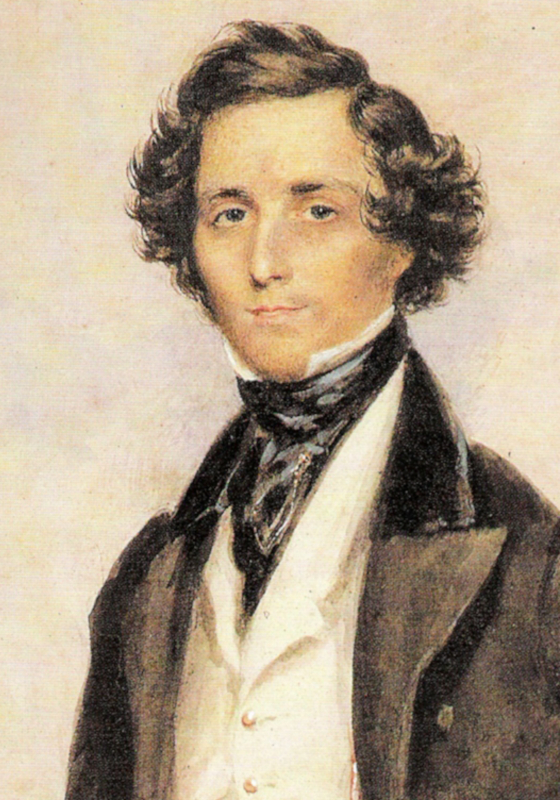
Felix Mendelssohn, 1839

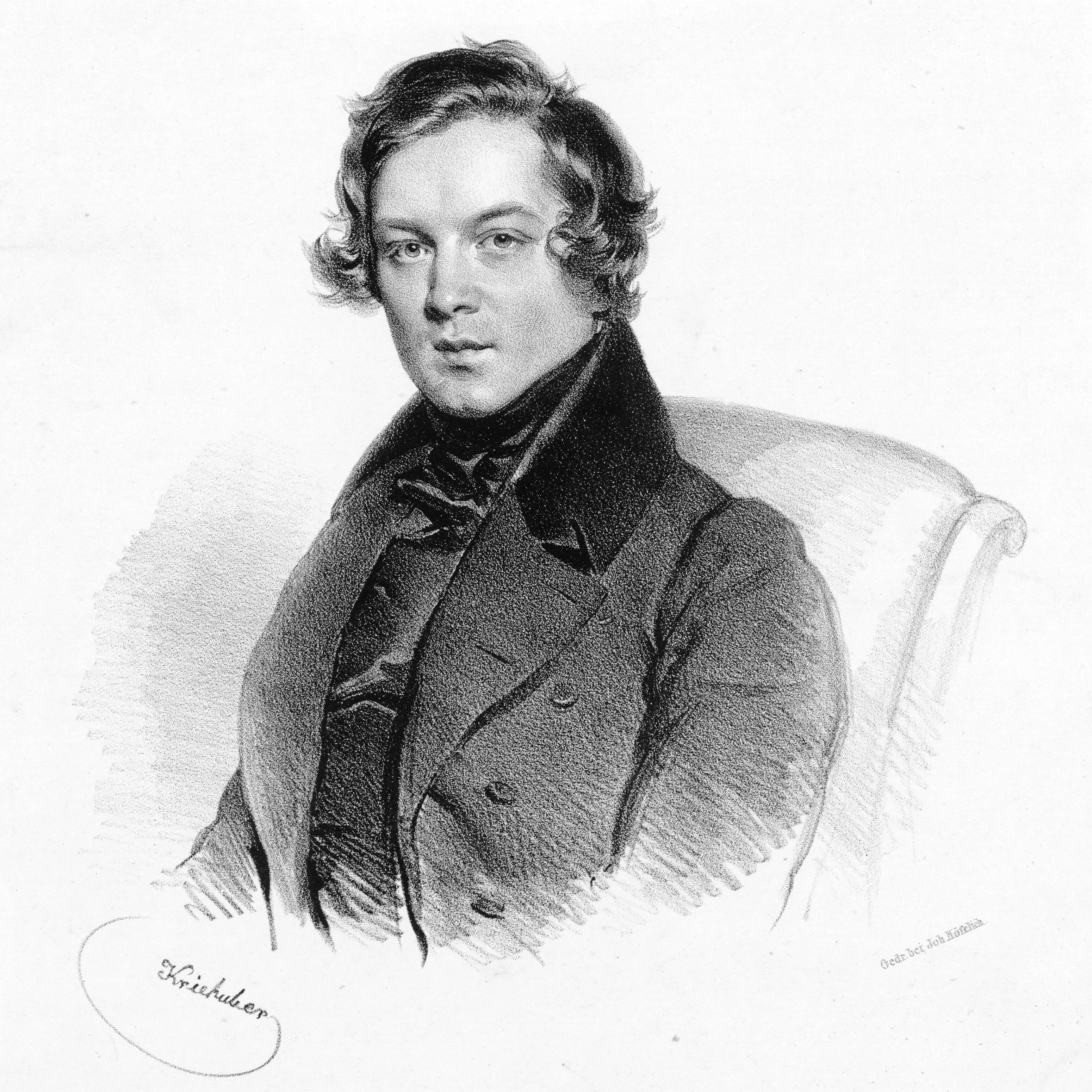
Robert Schumann, 1839

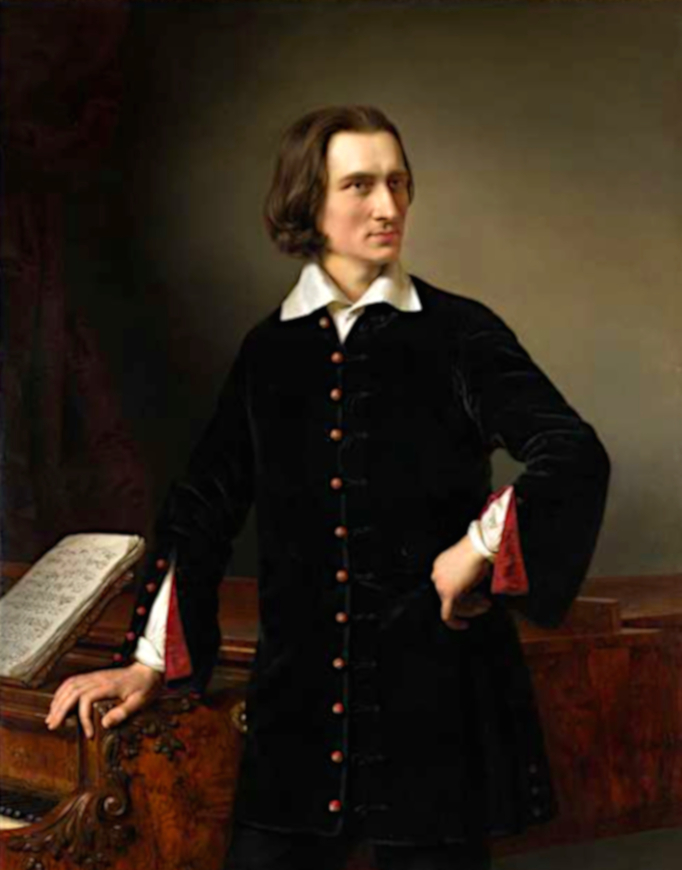
Franz Liszt, 1847

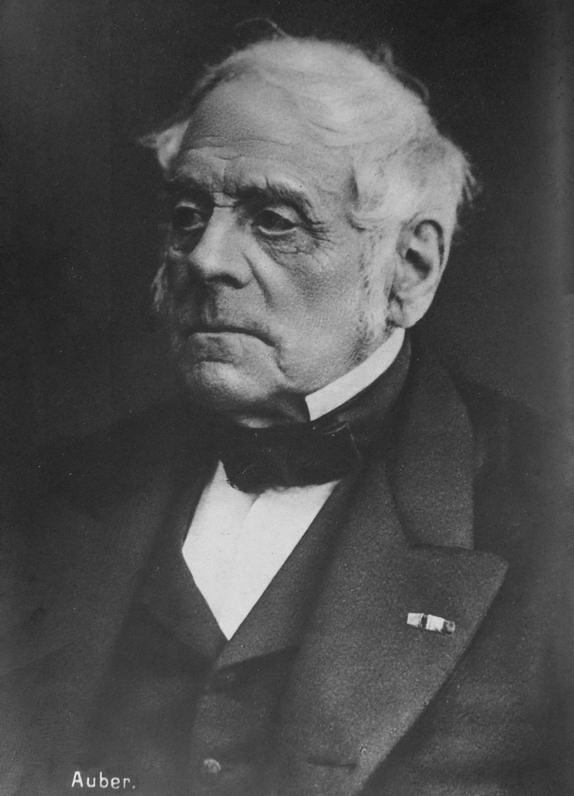
Daniel Auber, c. 1868

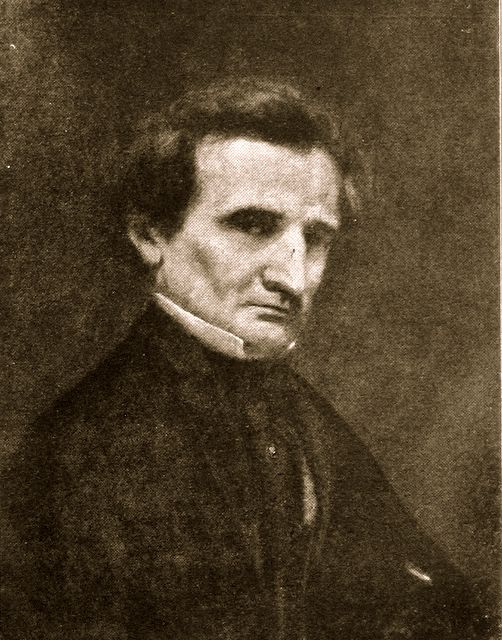
Hector Berlioz by Gustave Courbet, 1850

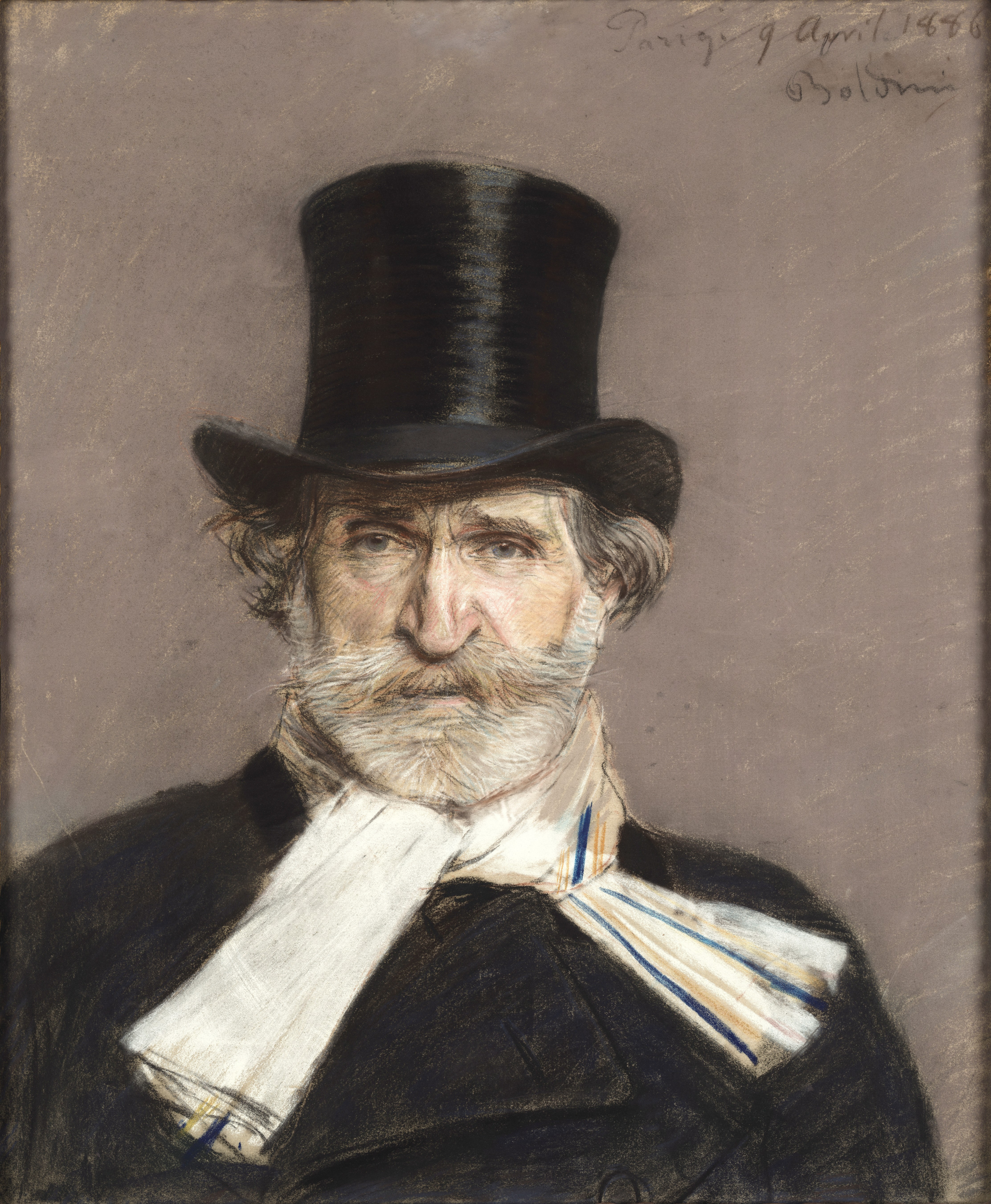
Portrait of Giuseppe Verdi by Giovanni Boldini, 1886

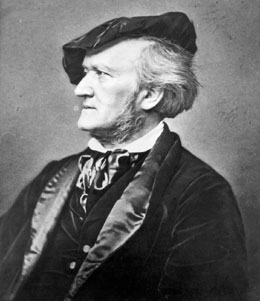
Richard Wagner, c. 1870s

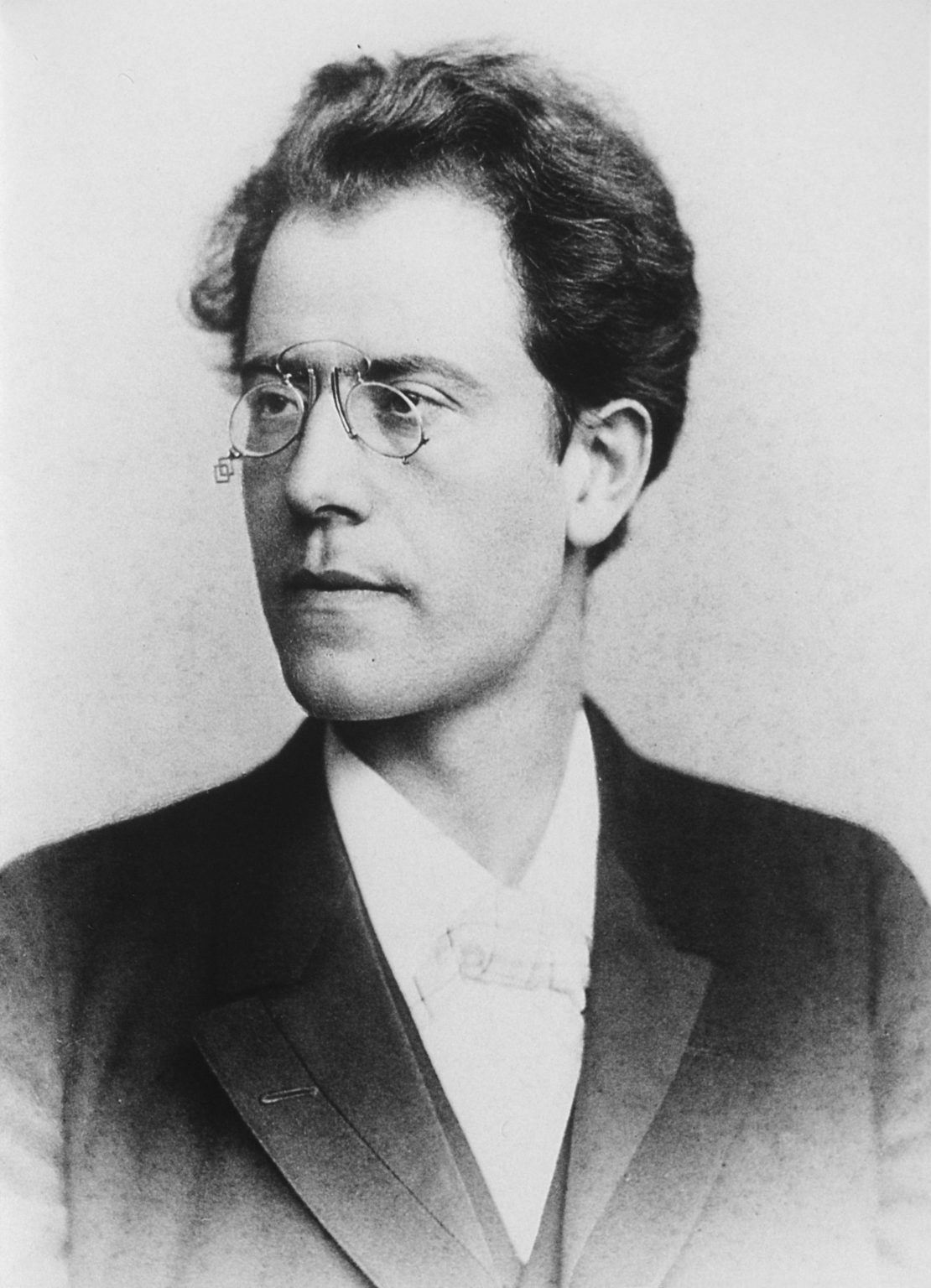
Gustav Mahler, 1896

== Outside the arts ==
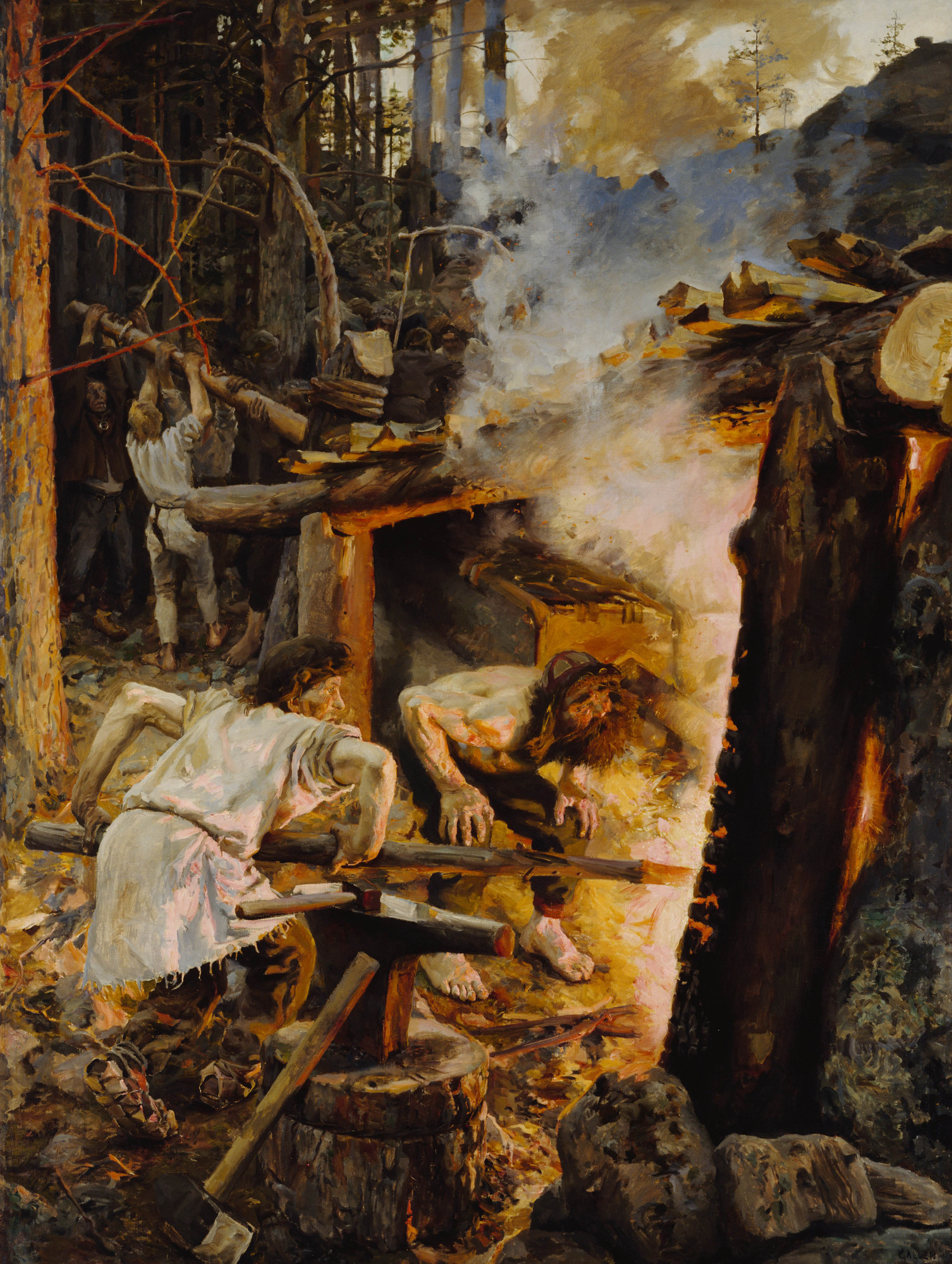
Akseli Gallen-Kallela, The Forging of the Sampo, 1893. An artist from Finland deriving inspiration from the Finnish "national epic", the Kalevala.

=== Sciences ===
The Romantic movement affected most aspects of intellectual life, and Romanticism and science had a powerful connection, especially in the period 1800–1840. Many scientists were influenced by versions of the Naturphilosophie of Johann Gottlieb Fichte, Friedrich Wilhelm Joseph von Schelling and Georg Wilhelm Friedrich Hegel and others, and without abandoning empiricism, sought in their work to uncover what they tended to believe was a unified and organic Nature. The English scientist Sir Humphry Davy, a prominent Romantic thinker, said that understanding nature required "an attitude of admiration, love and worship, [...] a personal response". He believed that knowledge was only attainable by those who truly appreciated and respected nature. Self-understanding was an important aspect of Romanticism. It had less to do with proving that man was capable of understanding nature (through his budding intellect) and therefore controlling it, and more to do with the emotional appeal of connecting himself with nature and understanding it through a harmonious co-existence.

=== Historiography ===
History writing was very strongly, and many would say harmfully, influenced by Romanticism. In England, Thomas Carlyle was a highly influential essayist who turned historian; he both invented and exemplified the phrase "hero-worship", lavishing largely uncritical praise on strong leaders such as Oliver Cromwell, Frederick the Great and Napoleon. Romantic nationalism had a largely negative effect on the writing of history in the 19th century, as each nation tended to produce its own version of history, and the critical attitude, even cynicism, of earlier historians was often replaced by a tendency to create romantic stories with clearly distinguished heroes and villains. Nationalist ideology of the period placed great emphasis on racial coherence, and the antiquity of peoples, and tended to vastly overemphasize the continuity between past periods and the present, leading to national mysticism. Much historical effort in the 20th century was devoted to combating the romantic historical myths created in the 19th century.

=== Theology ===
To insulate theology from scientism or reductionism in science, 19th-century post-Enlightenment German theologians developed a modernist or so-called liberal conception of Christianity, led by Friedrich Schleiermacher and Albrecht Ritschl. They took the Romantic approach of rooting religion in the inner world of the human spirit, so that it is a person's feeling or sensibility about spiritual matters that comprises religion.

=== Chess ===
Romantic chess was the style of chess which emphasized quick, tactical maneuvers characterized by aesthetic beauty rather than long-term strategic planning, which was considered to be of secondary importance. The Romantic era in chess is generally considered to have begun around the 18th century (although a primarily tactical style of chess was predominant even earlier), and to have reached its peak with Joseph MacDonnell and Pierre LaBourdonnais, the two dominant chess players in the 1830s. The 1840s were dominated by Howard Staunton, and other leading players of the era included Adolf Anderssen, Daniel Harrwitz, Henry Bird, Louis Paulsen, and Paul Morphy. The "Immortal Game", played by Anderssen and Lionel Kieseritzky on 21 June 1851 in London—where Anderssen made bold sacrifices to secure victory, giving up both rooks and a bishop, then his queen, and then checkmating his opponent with his three remaining minor pieces—is considered a supreme example of Romantic chess. The end of the Romantic era in chess is considered to be the 1873 Vienna Tournament where Wilhelm Steinitz popularized positional play and the closed game.

== Romantic nationalism ==
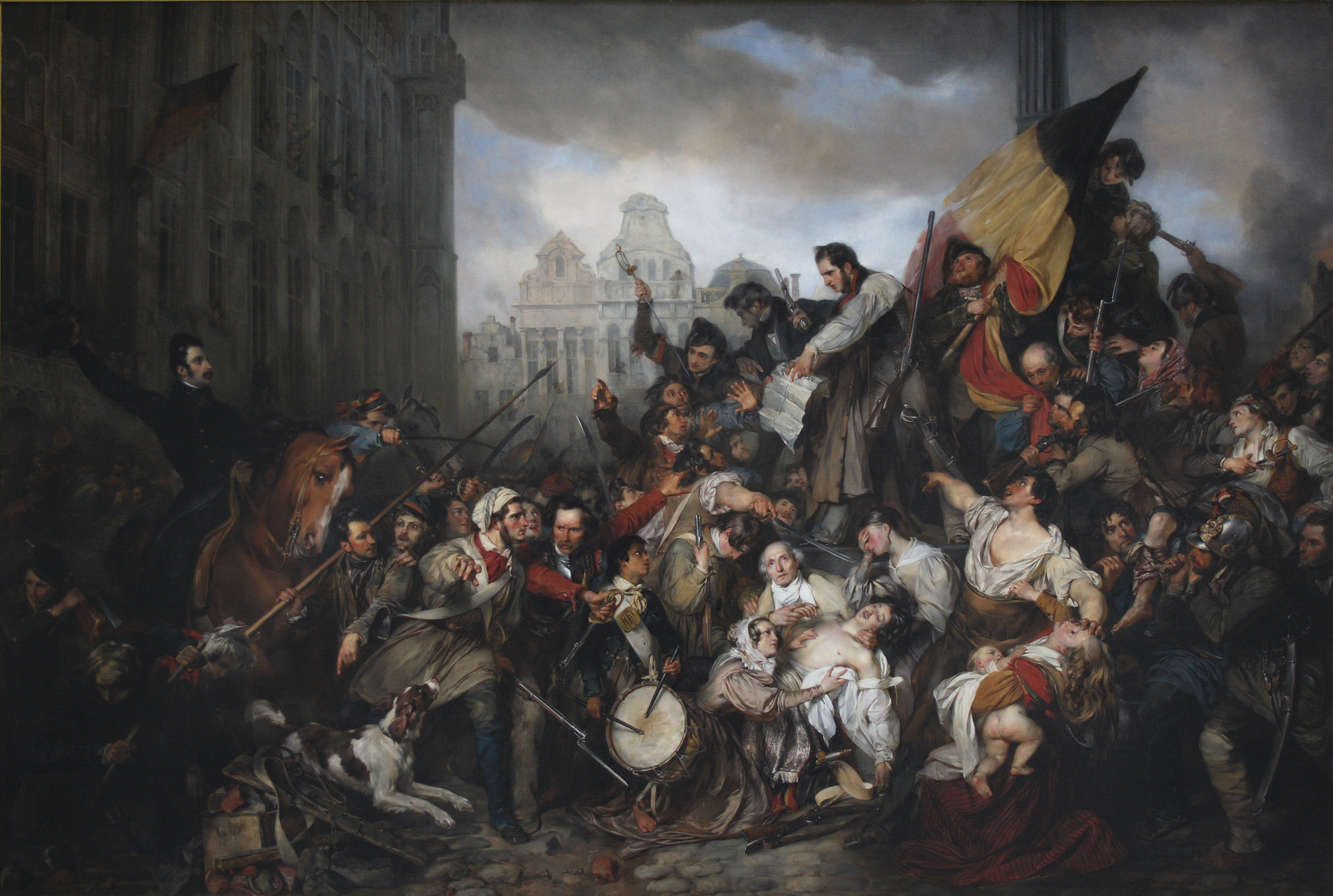
Egide Charles Gustave Wappers, Episode of the Belgian Revolution of 1830, 1834, Oldmasters Museum, Brussels. A romantic vision by a Belgian painter.

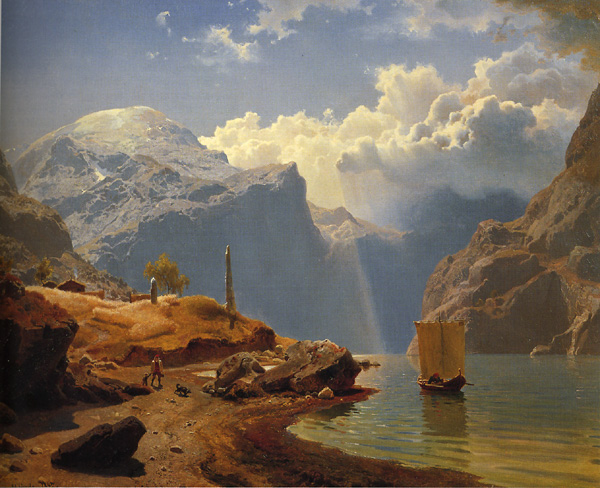
Hans Gude, Fra Hardanger, 1847. Example of Norwegian romantic nationalism.

One of Romanticism's key ideas and most enduring legacies is the assertion of nationalism, which became a central theme of Romantic art and political philosophy. From the earliest parts of the movement, with their focus on development of national languages and folklore, and the importance of local customs and traditions, to the movements that would redraw the map of Europe and lead to calls for self-determination of nationalities, nationalism was one of the key vehicles of Romanticism, its role, expression and meaning. One of the most important functions of medieval references in the 19th century was nationalist. Popular and epic poetry were its workhorses. This is visible in Germany and Ireland, where underlying Germanic or Celtic linguistic substrates dating from before the Romanization-Latinization were sought out.

Early Romantic nationalism was strongly inspired by Rousseau, and by the ideas of Johann Gottfried von Herder, who in 1784 argued that the geography formed the natural economy of a people, and shaped their customs and society.

The nature of nationalism changed dramatically, however, after the French Revolution with the rise of Napoleon, and the reactions in other nations. Napoleonic nationalism and republicanism were, at first, inspirational to movements in other nations: self-determination and a consciousness of national unity were held to be two of the reasons why France was able to defeat other countries in battle. But as the French Republic became Napoleon's Empire, Napoleon became not the inspiration for nationalism, but the object of its struggle. In Prussia, the development of spiritual renewal as a means to engage in the struggle against Napoleon was argued by, among others, Johann Gottlieb Fichte, a disciple of Kant. The word Volkstum, or nationality, was coined in German as part of this resistance to the now conquering emperor. Fichte expressed the unity of language and nation in his address "To the German Nation" in 1806:

Those who speak the same language are joined to each other by a multitude of invisible bonds by nature herself, long before any human art begins; they understand each other and have the power of continuing to make themselves understood more and more clearly; they belong together and are by nature one and an inseparable whole. ...Only when each people, left to itself, develops and forms itself in accordance with its own peculiar quality, and only when in every people each individual develops himself in accordance with that common quality, as well as in accordance with his own peculiar quality—then, and then only, does the manifestation of divinity appear in its true mirror as it ought to be.

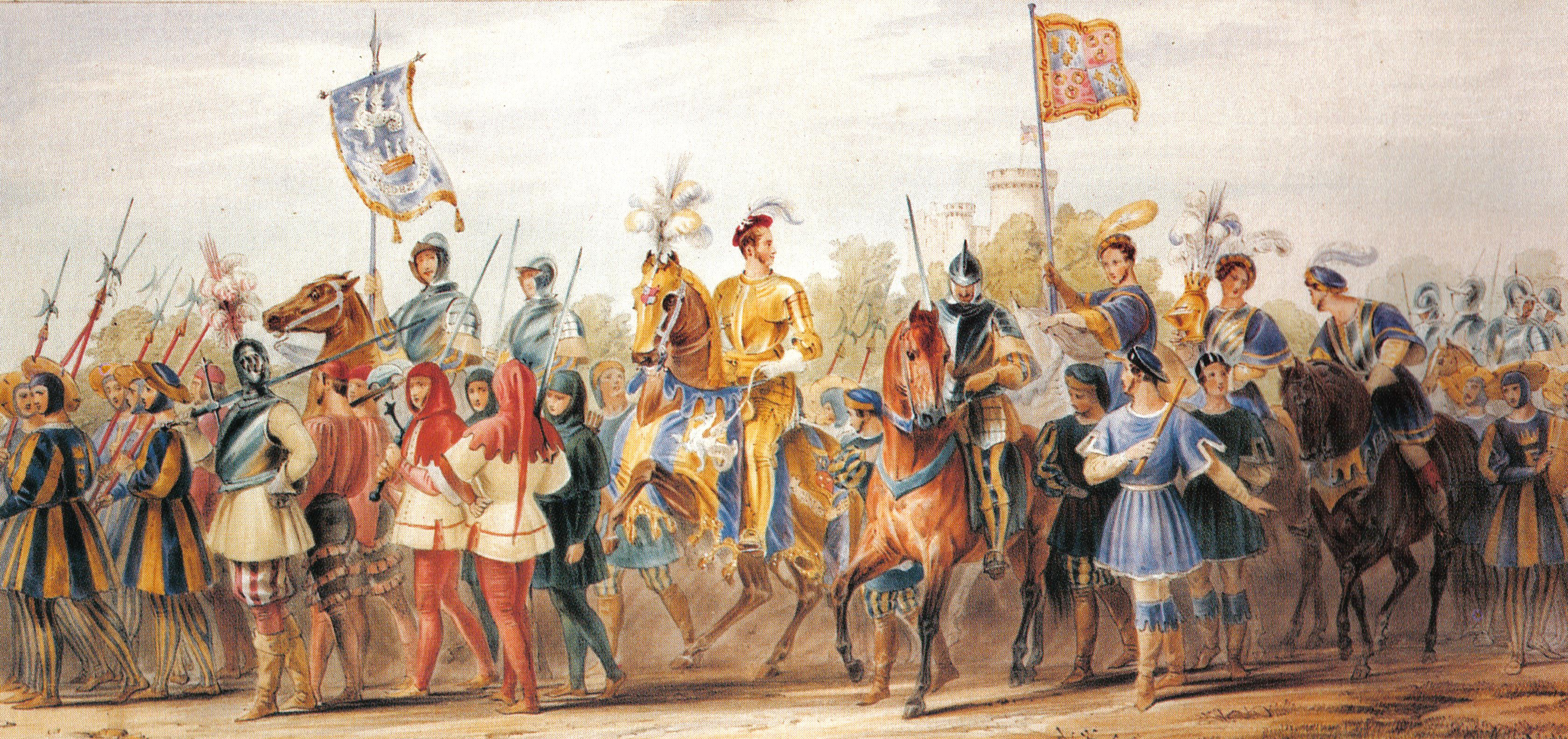
The Eglinton Tournament in 1839

This view of nationalism inspired the collection of folklore by such people as the Brothers Grimm, the revival of old epics as national, and the construction of new epics as if they were old, as in the Kalevala, compiled from Finnish tales and folklore, or Ossian, where the claimed ancient roots were invented. The view that fairy tales, unless contaminated from outside literary sources, were preserved in the same form over thousands of years, was not exclusive to Romantic Nationalists, but fit in well with their views that such tales expressed the primordial nature of a people. For instance, the Brothers Grimm rejected many tales they collected because of their similarity to tales by Charles Perrault, which they thought proved they were not truly German tales; Sleeping Beauty survived in their collection because the tale of Brynhildr convinced them that the figure of the sleeping princess was authentically German. Vuk Karadžić contributed to Serbian folk literature, using peasant culture as the foundation. He regarded the oral literature of the peasants as an integral part of Serbian culture, compiling it to use in his collections of folk songs, tales and proverbs, as well as the first dictionary of vernacular Serbian. Similar projects were undertaken by the Russian Alexander Afanasyev, the Norwegians Peter Christen Asbjørnsen and Jørgen Moe, and the Englishman Joseph Jacobs.

=== Polish nationalism and messianism ===
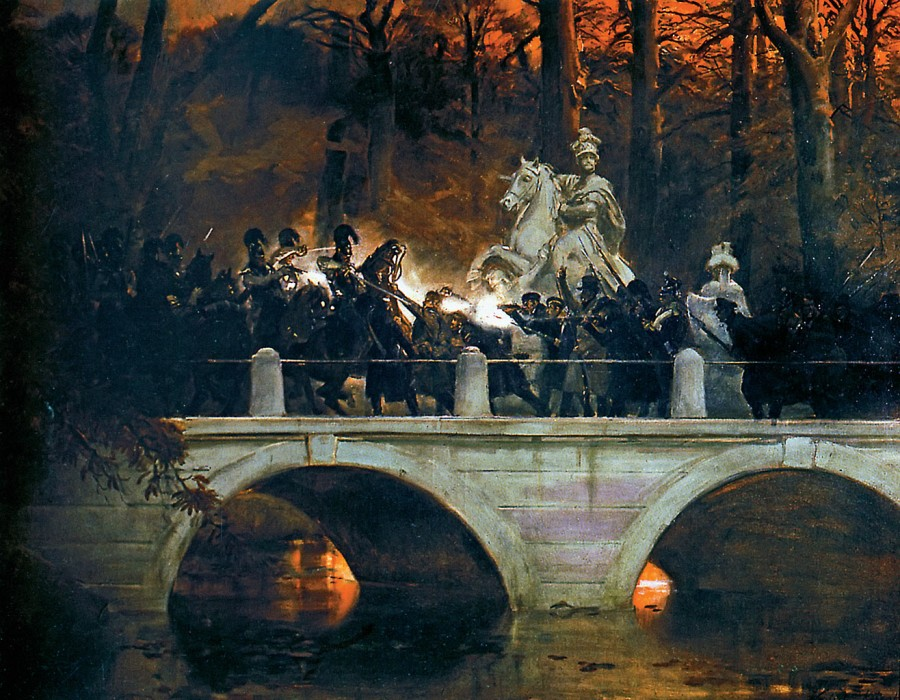
The November Uprising (1830–31), in the Kingdom of Poland, against the Russian Empire

Romanticism played an essential role in the national awakening of many Central European peoples lacking their own national states, not least in Poland, which had recently failed to restore its independence when Russia's army crushed the Polish Uprising under Nicholas I. Revival and reinterpretation of ancient myths, customs and traditions by Romantic poets and painters helped to distinguish their indigenous cultures from those of the dominant nations and crystallise the mythography of Romantic nationalism. Patriotism, nationalism, revolution and armed struggle for independence also became popular themes in the arts of this period.

Arguably, the most distinguished Romantic poet of this part of Europe was Adam Mickiewicz, who developed an idea that Poland was the Messiah of Nations, predestined to suffer just as Jesus had suffered to save all the people. The Polish self-image as a "Christ among nations" or the martyr of Europe can be traced back to its history of Christendom and suffering under invasions. During the periods of foreign occupation, the Catholic Church served as bastion of Poland's national identity and language, and the major promoter of Polish culture. The partitions came to be seen in Poland as a Polish sacrifice for the security for Western civilization. Adam Mickiewicz wrote the patriotic drama Dziady (directed against the Russians), where he depicts Poland as the Christ of Nations. He also wrote "Verily I say unto you, it is not for you to learn civilization from foreigners, but it is you who are to teach them civilization ... You are among the foreigners like the Apostles among the idolaters". In Books of the Polish Nation and Polish Pilgrimage Mickiewicz detailed his vision of Poland as a Messias and a Christ of Nations that would save mankind. Dziady is known for its various interpretations. The most known ones are the moral aspect of part II, the individualist and romantic message of part IV, as well as the deeply patriotic, messianistic and Christian vision in part III of the poem. Zdzisław Kępiński, however, focuses his interpretation on Slavic pagan and occult elements found in the drama. In his book Mickiewicz hermetyczny he writes about hermetic, theosophic and alchemical philosophy in the work as well as Masonic symbols.

== Gallery ==
Emerging Romanticism in the 18th century

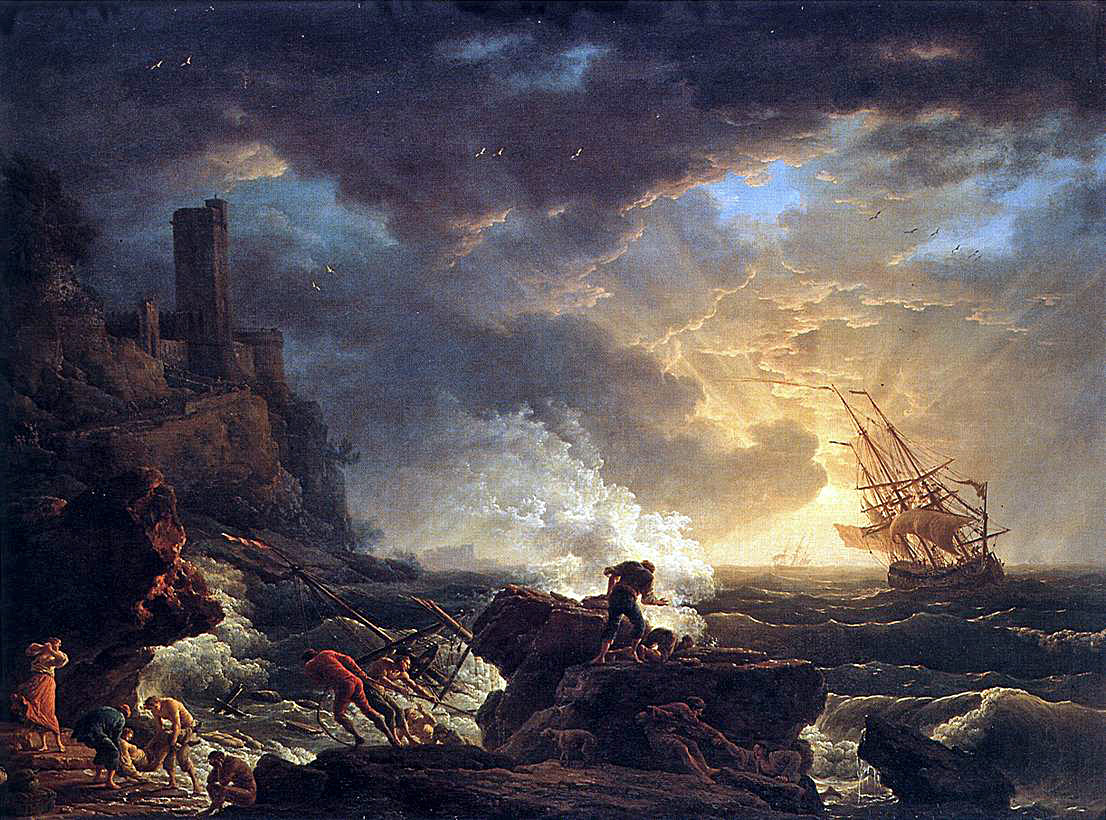
Joseph Vernet, 1759, Shipwreck; the 18th-century "sublime"

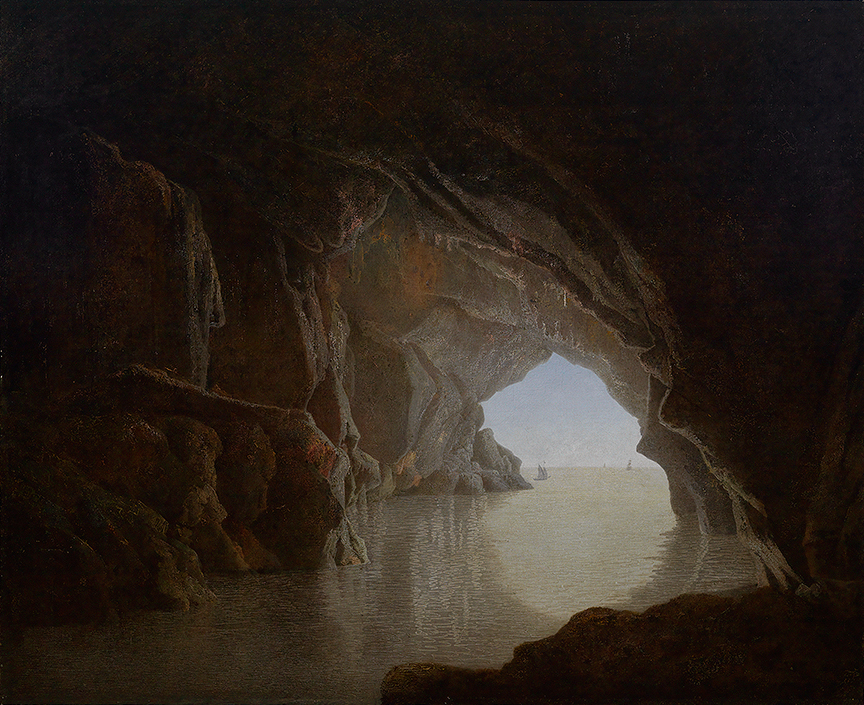
Joseph Wright, 1774, Cave at evening, Smith College Museum of Art, Northampton, Massachusetts

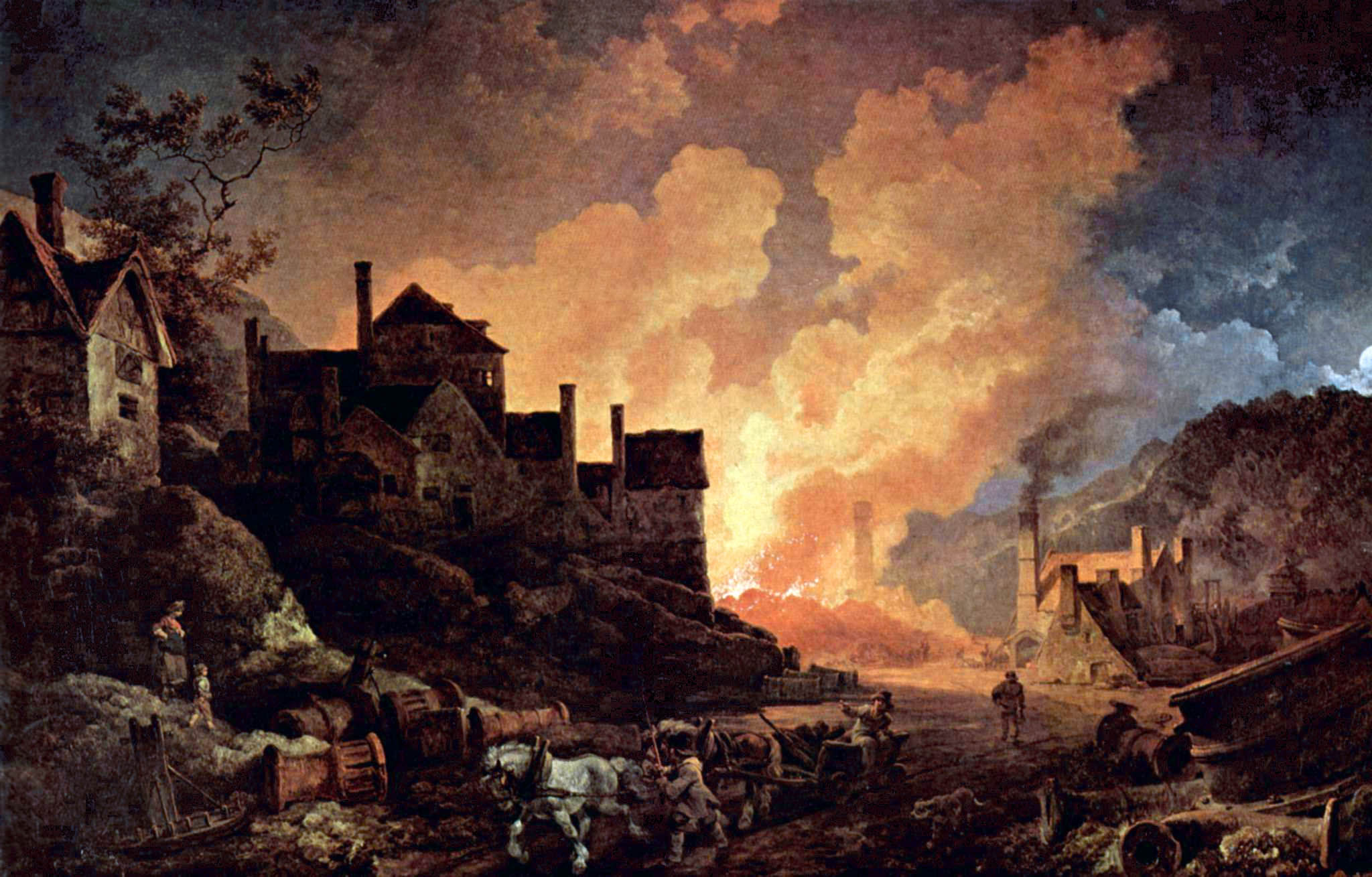
Philip James de Loutherbourg, Coalbrookdale by Night, 1801, a key location of the English Industrial Revolution

French Romantic painting

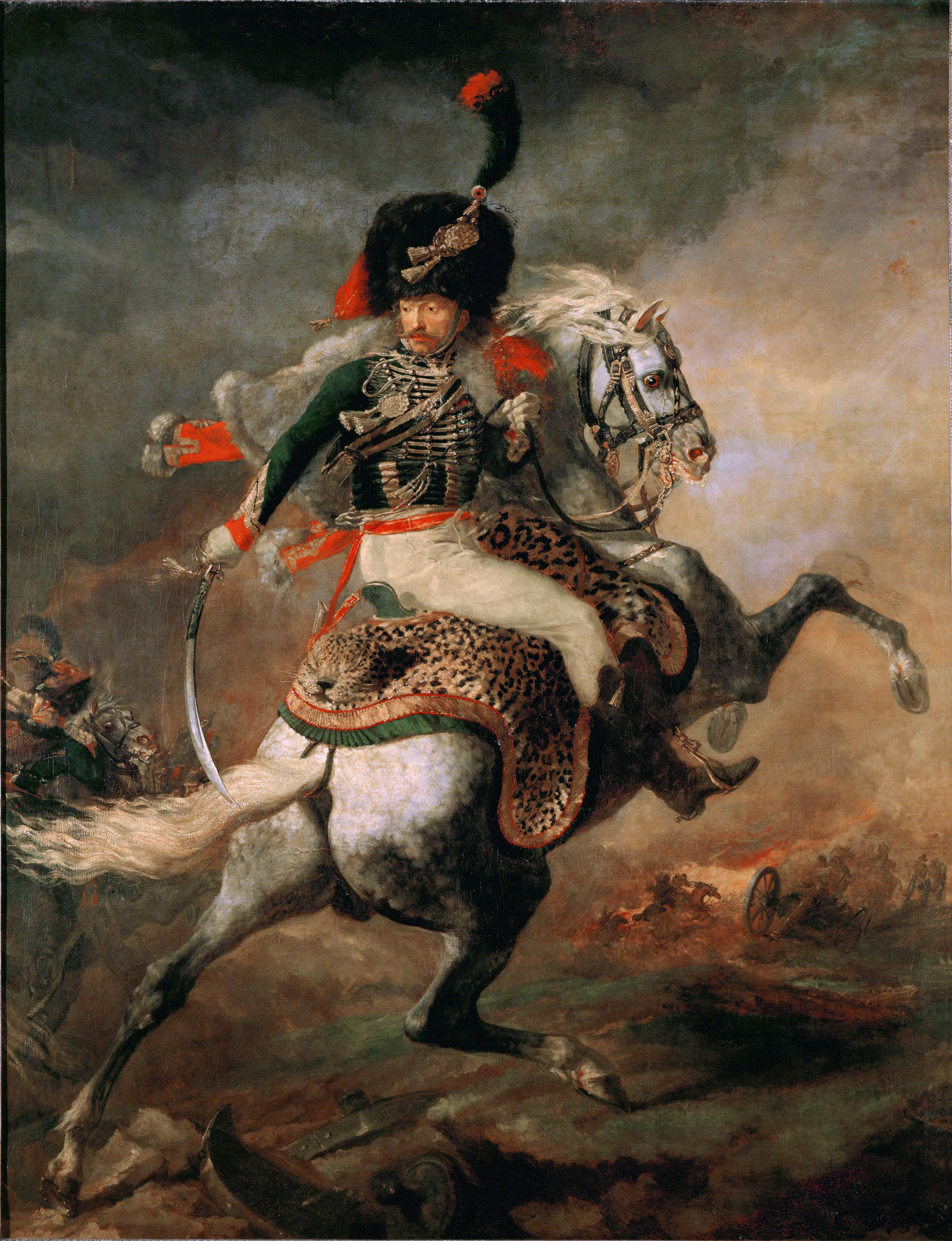
Théodore Géricault, The Charging Chasseur, c. 1812

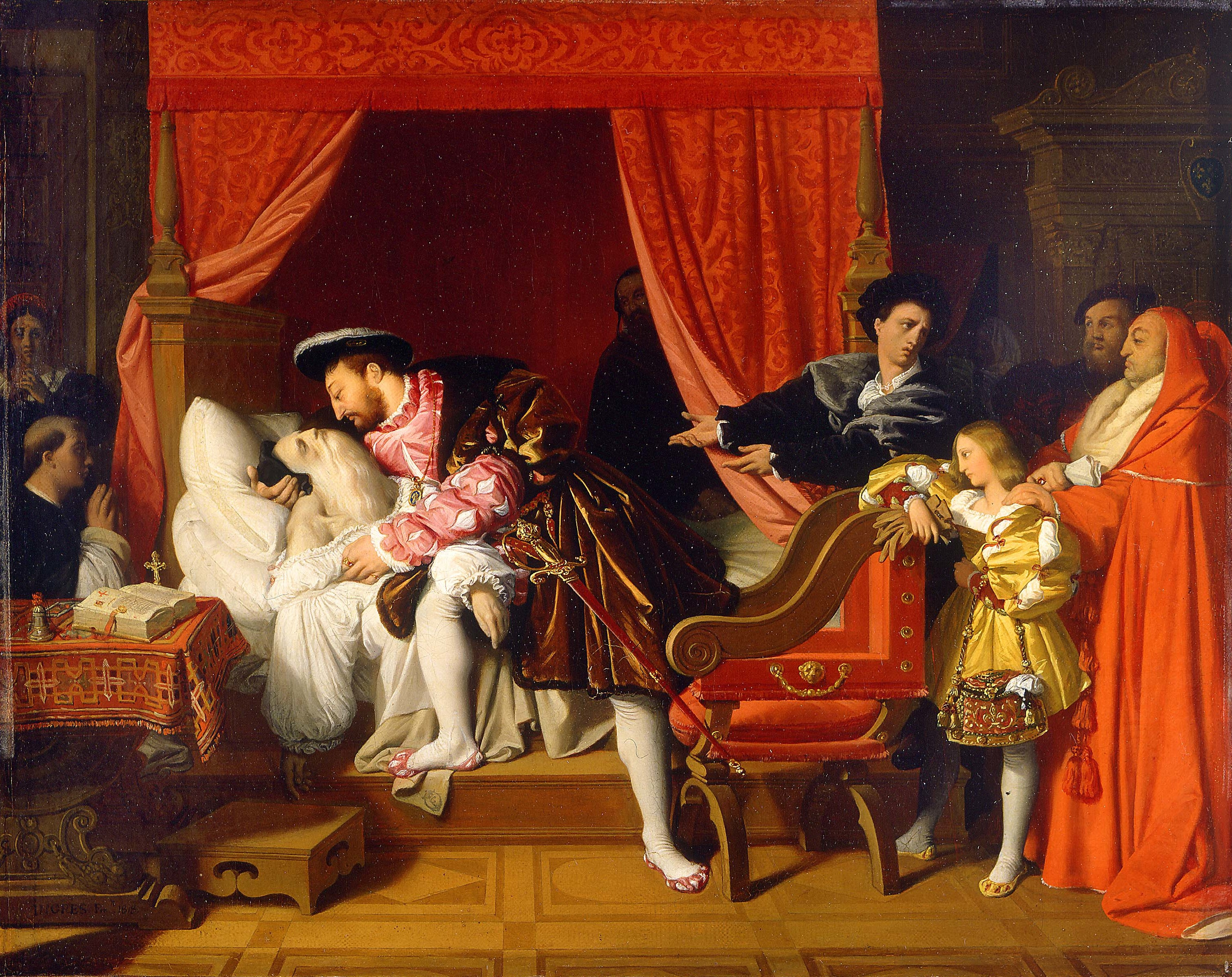
Ingres, The Death of Leonardo da Vinci, 1818, one of his Troubadour style works

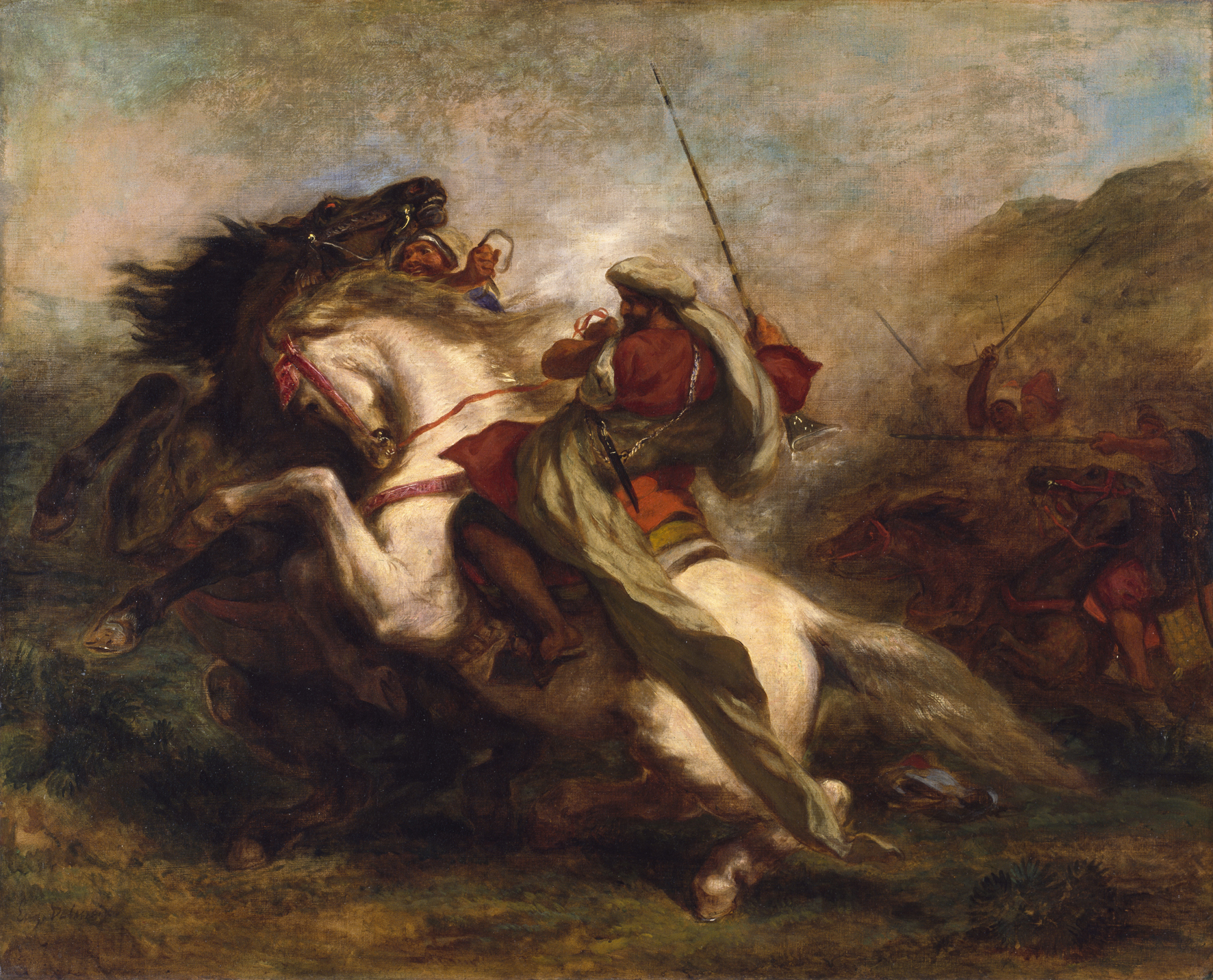
Eugène Delacroix, Collision of Moorish Horsemen, 1843–44

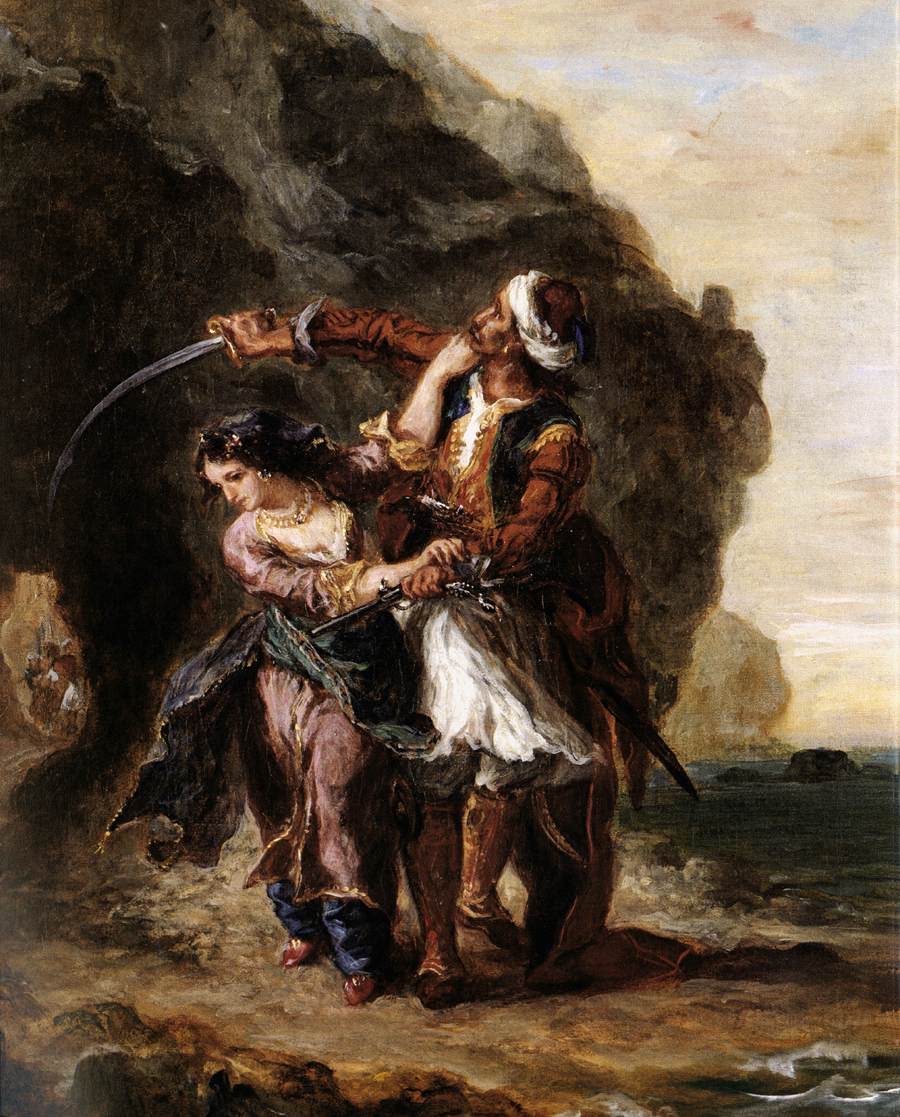
Eugène Delacroix, The Bride of Abydos, 1857, after the poem by Byron

German Romantic painting

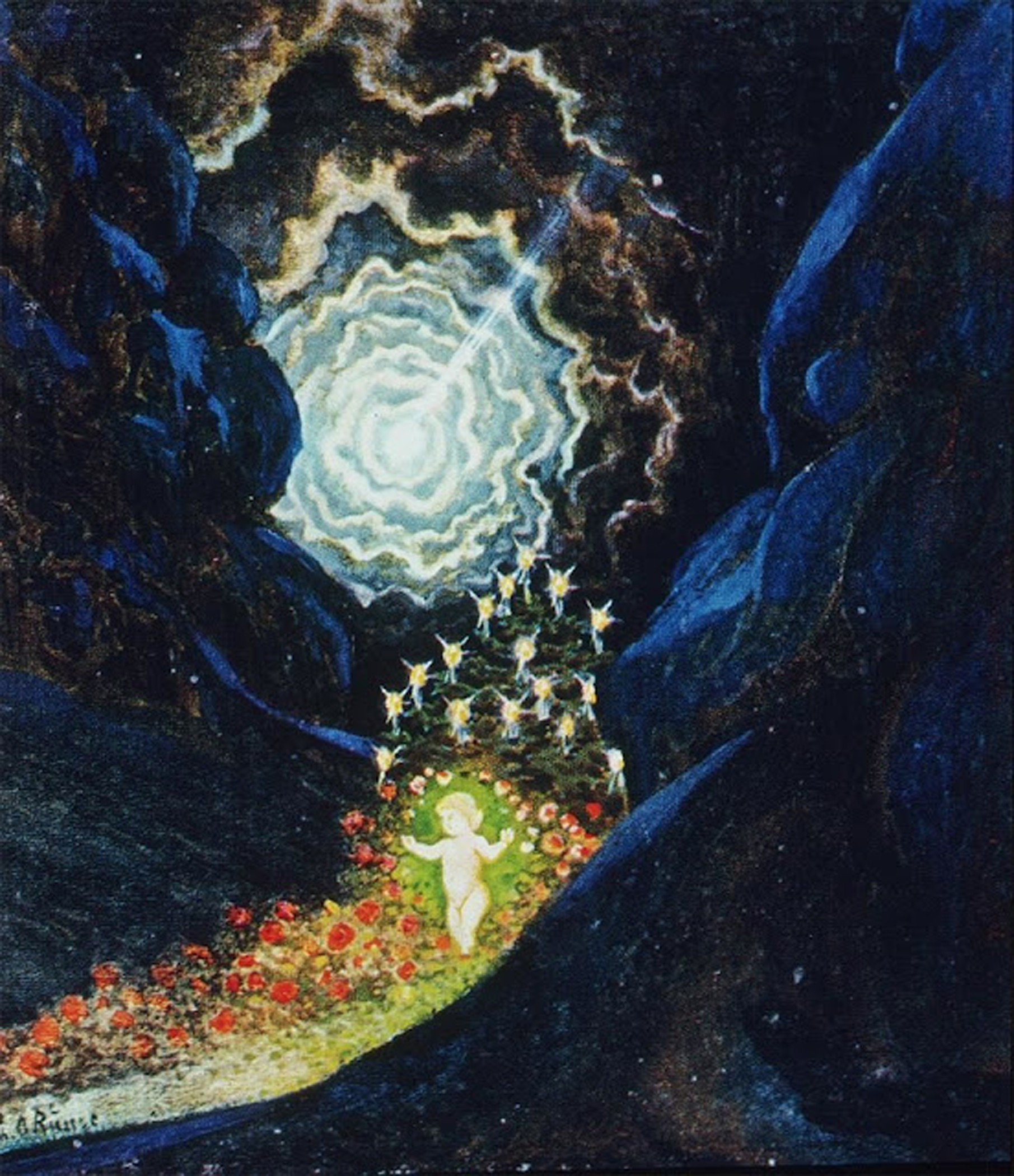
Philipp Otto Runge, Birth of the Human Soul, c. 1806

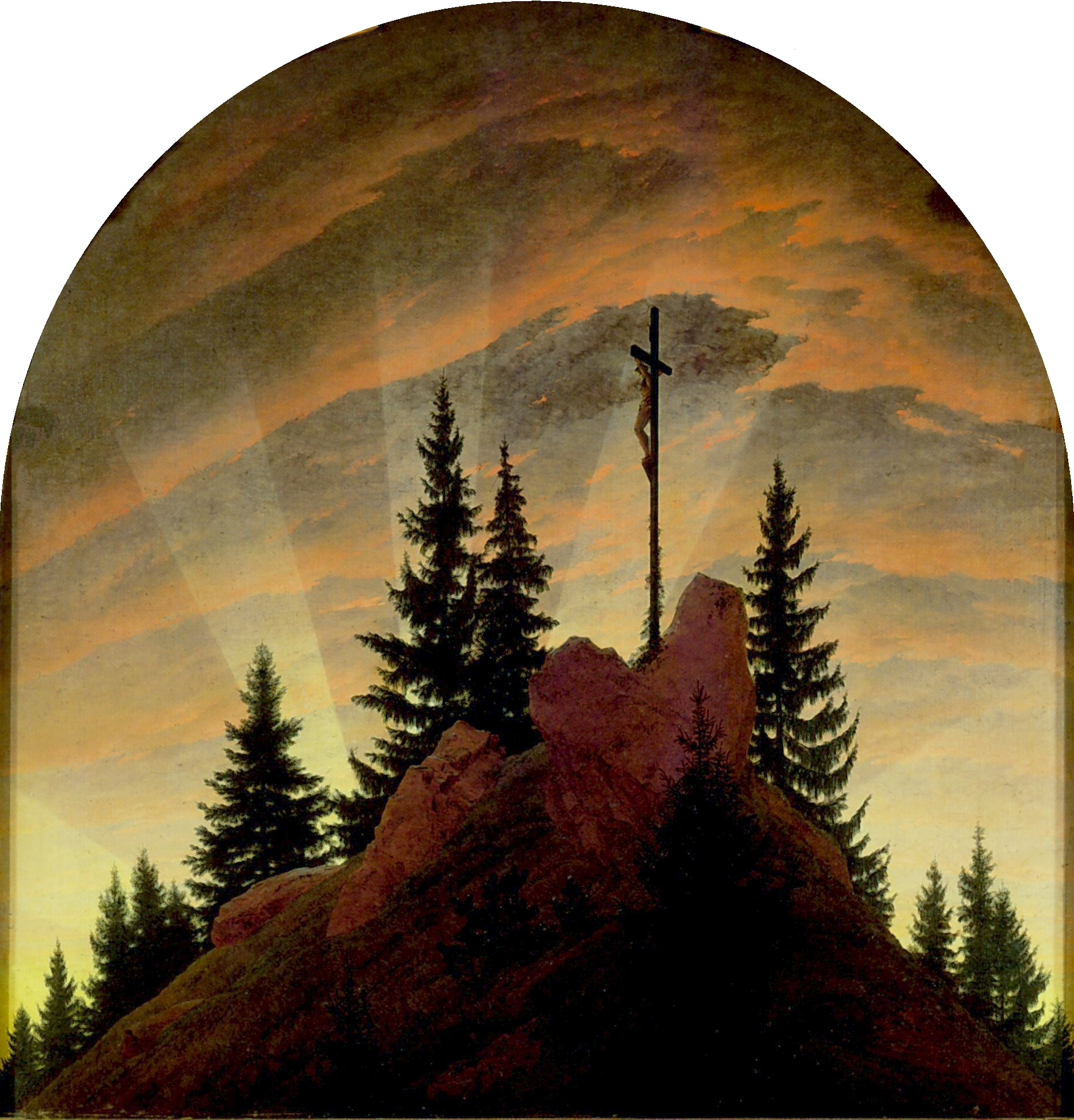
Caspar David Friedrich, Cross in the Mountains (Tetschen Altar), 1808. Friedrich's first major work, breaking with the traditional representation of crucifixion in altarpieces by depicting the scene as a landscape.

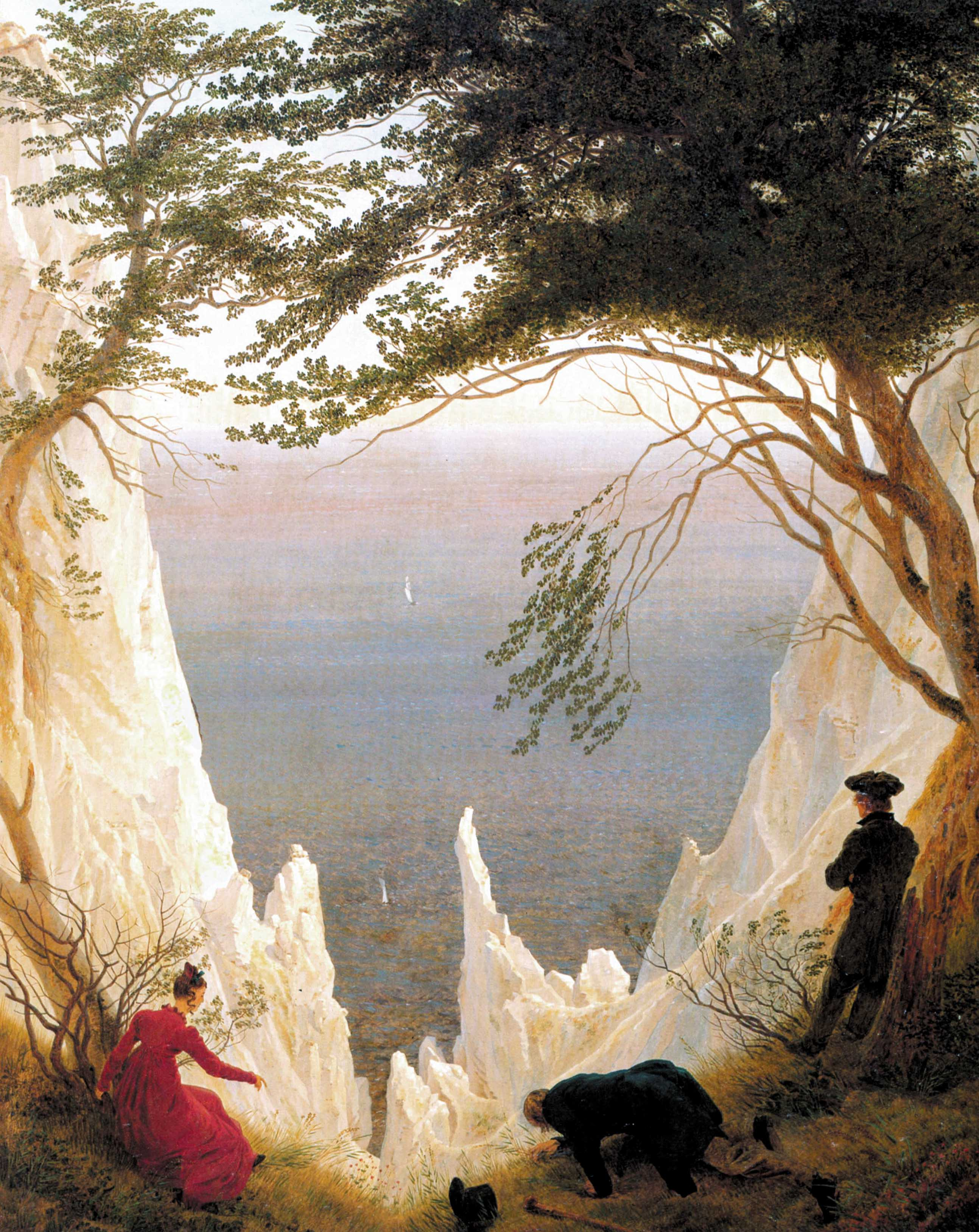
Friedrich, Chalk Cliffs on Rügen, (1818). Friedrich married Christiane Caroline Bommer in 1818, and on their honeymoon they visited relatives in Neubrandenburg and Greifswald. This painting celebrates the couple's union.

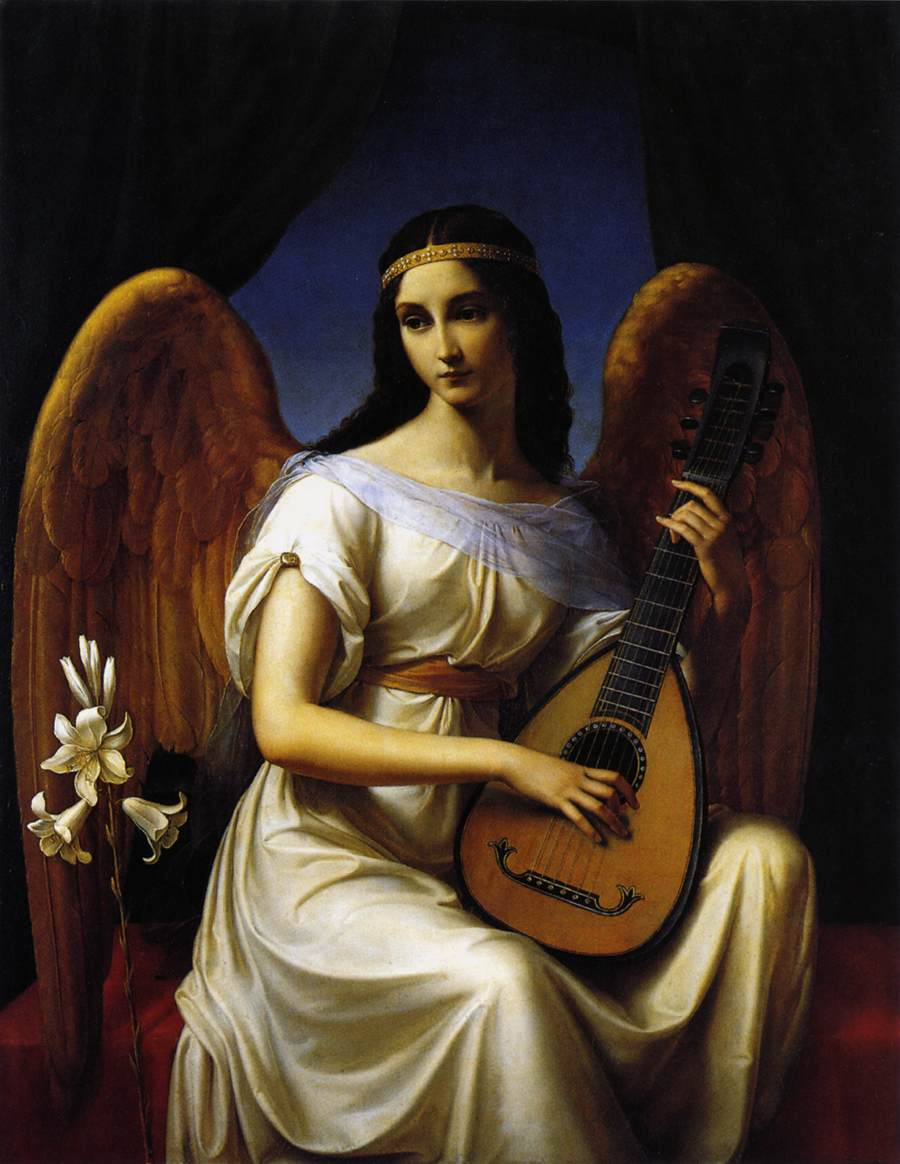
Friedrich Wilhelm Schadow, Mignon (1828)

Other

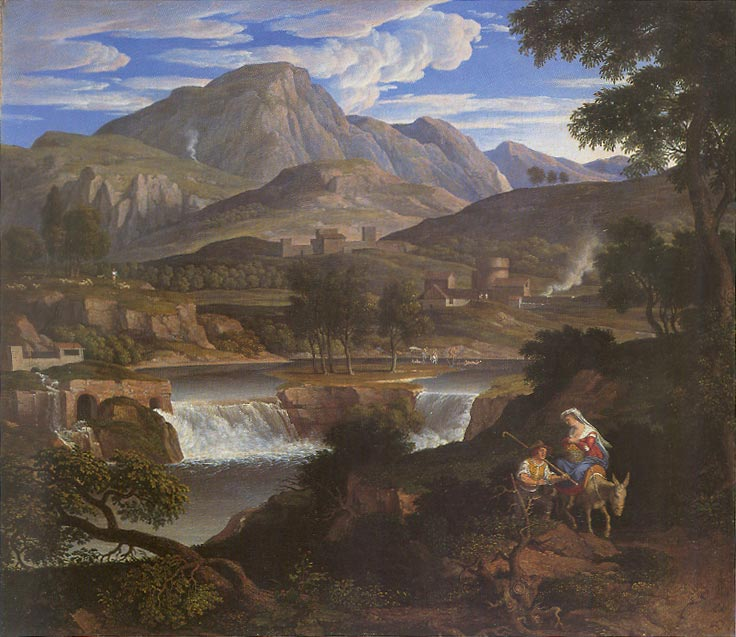
Joseph Anton Koch, Waterfalls at Subiaco, 1812–1813, a "classical" landscape to art historians

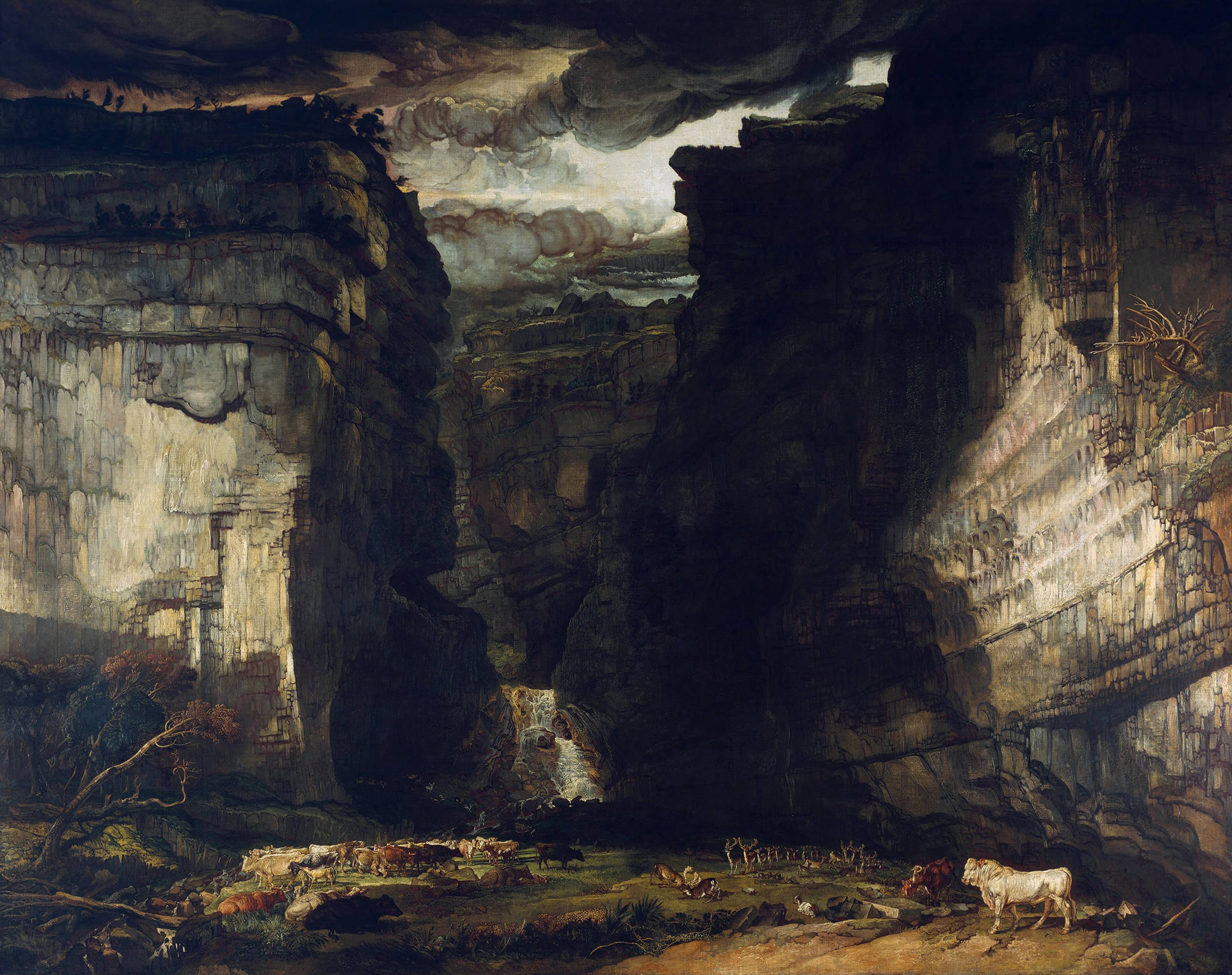
James Ward, 1814–1815, Gordale Scar

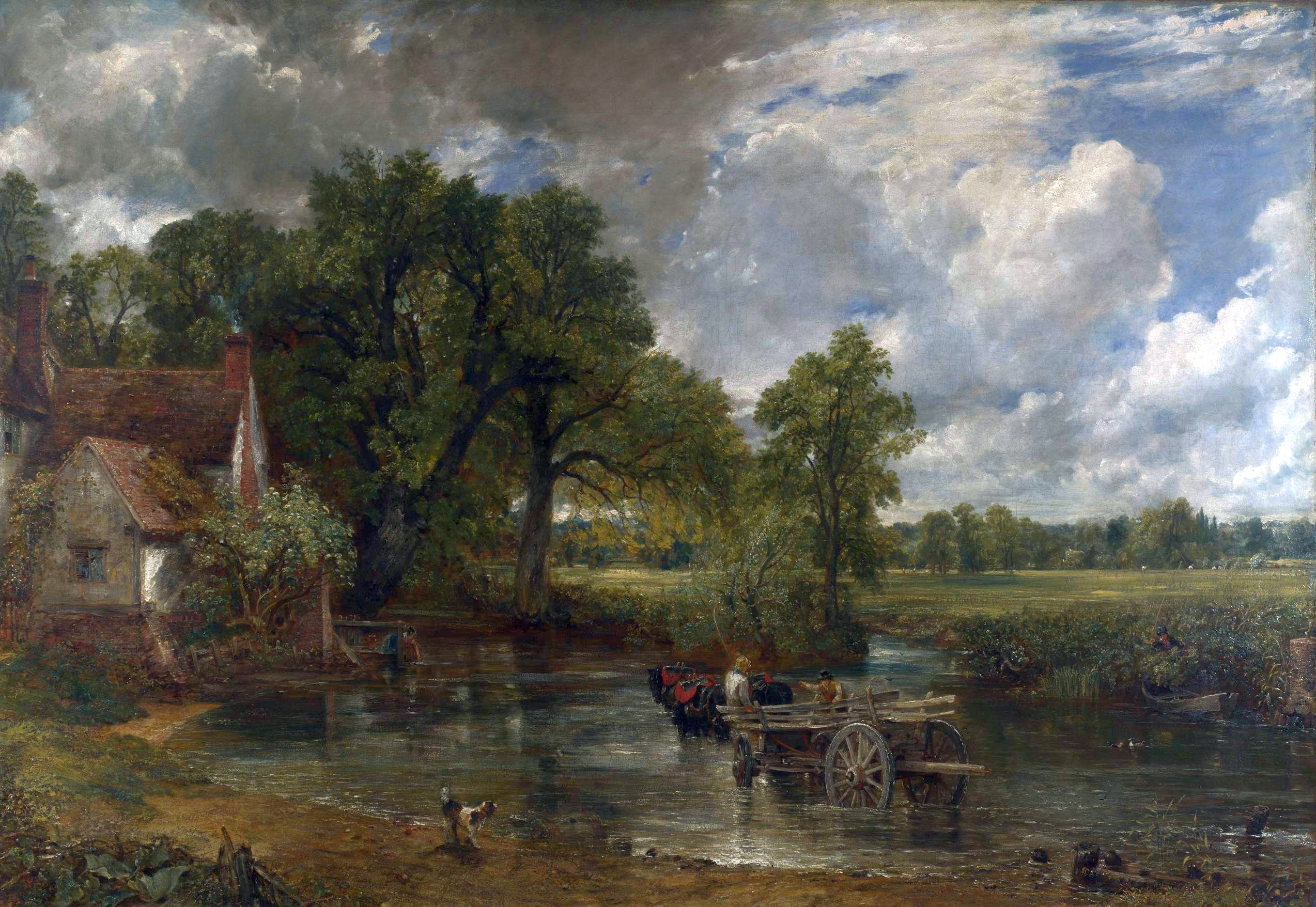
John Constable, 1821, The Hay Wain, one of Constable's large "six footers"

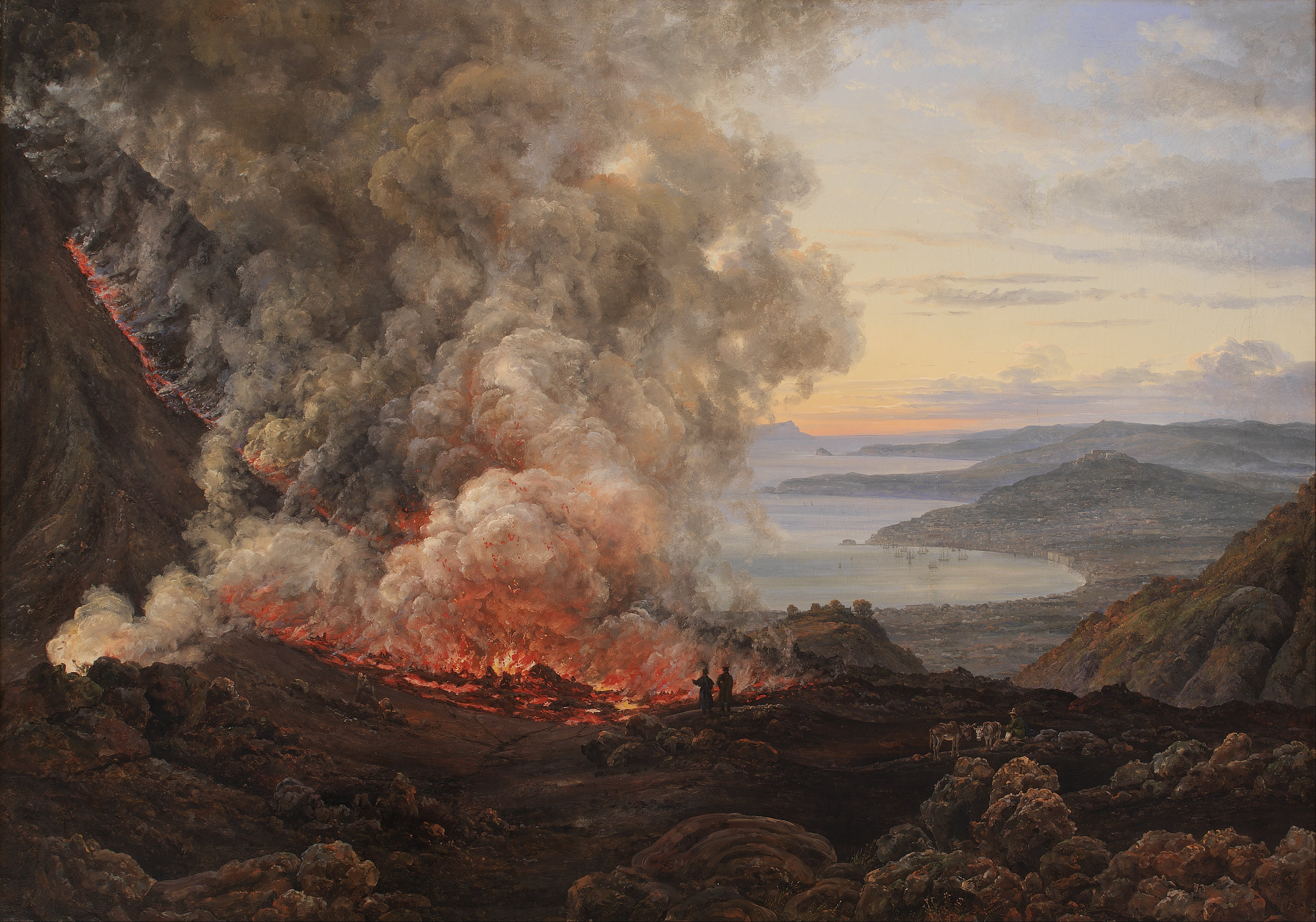
J. C. Dahl, 1826, Eruption of Vesuvius, by Friedrich's closest follower

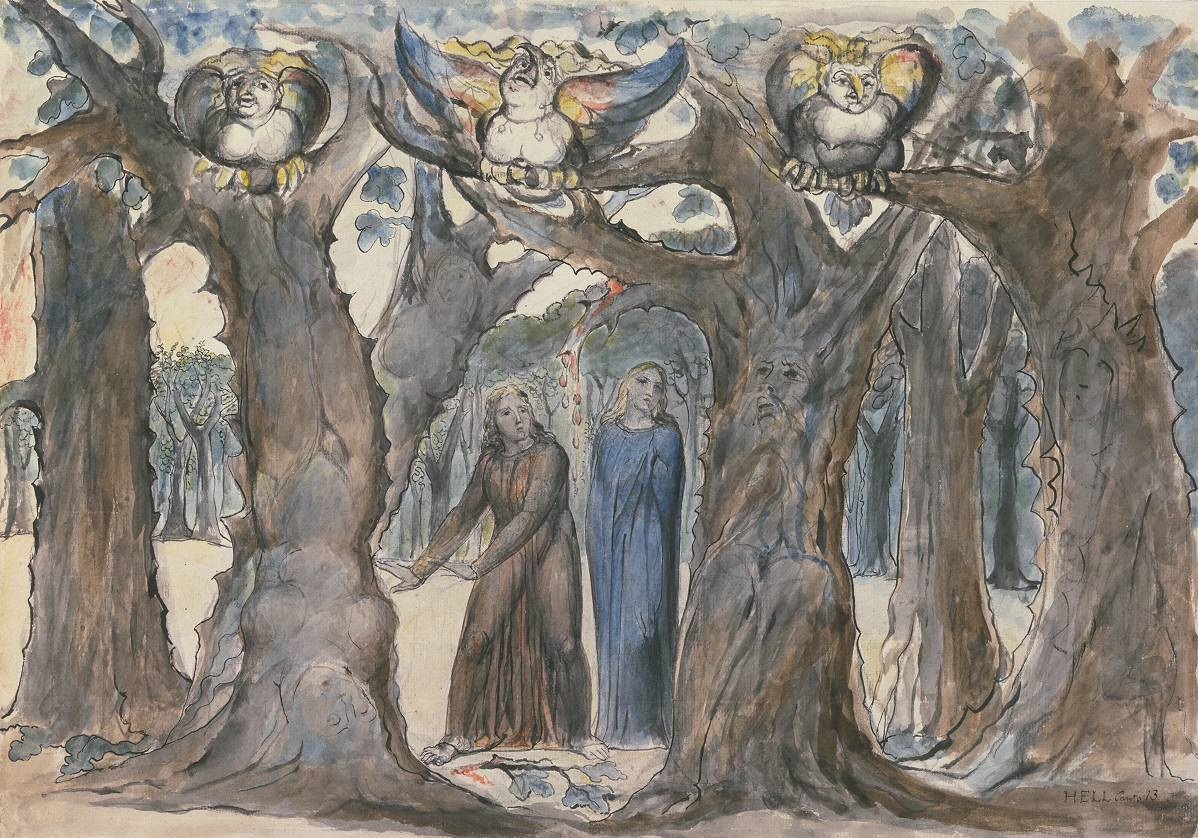
William Blake, c. 1824–1827, The Wood of the Self-Murderers: The Harpies and the Suicides, Tate

Karl Bryullov, The Last Day of Pompeii, 1833, State Russian Museum, St. Petersburg, Russia

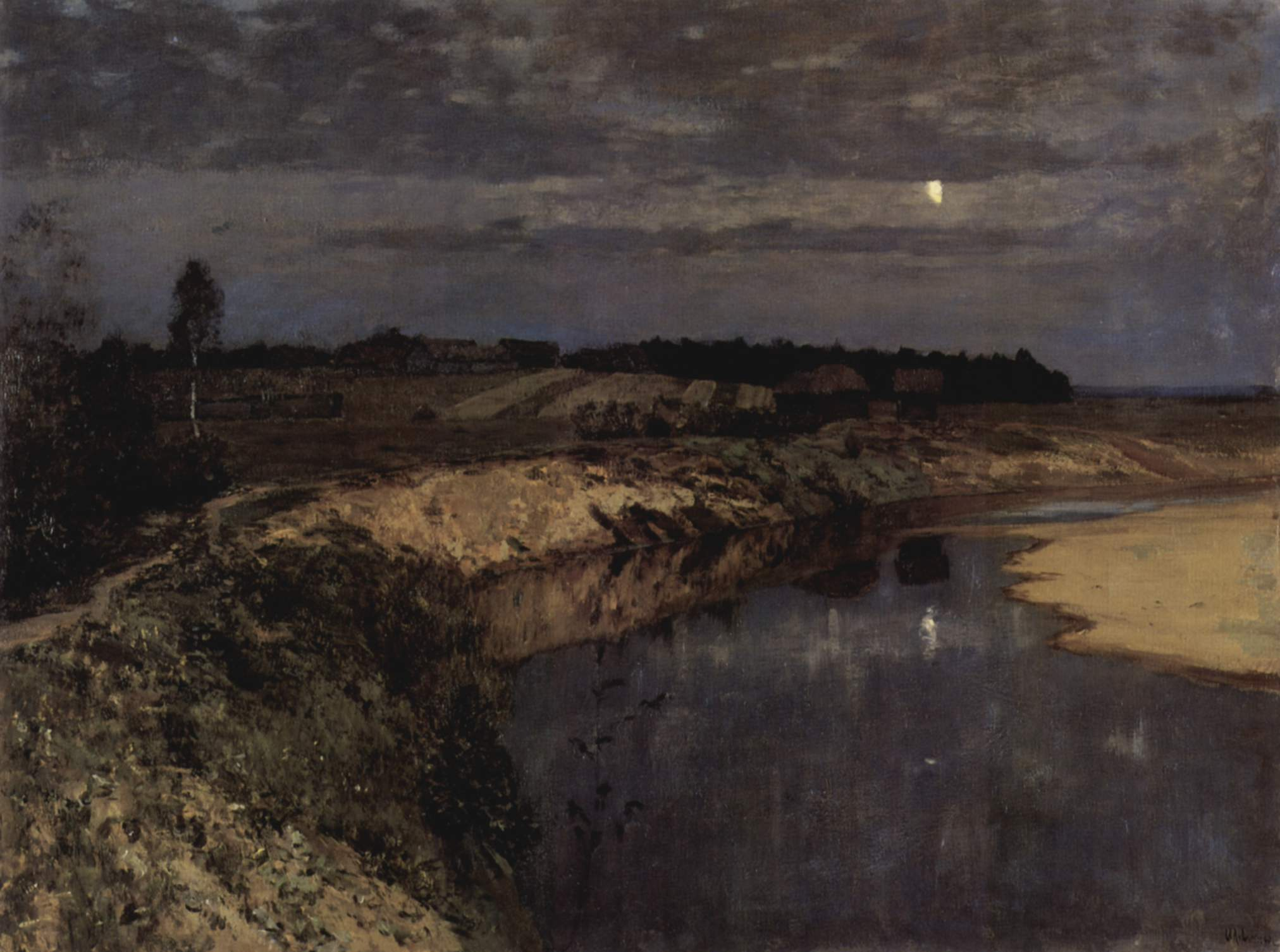
Isaac Levitan, Pacific, 1898, State Russian Museum, St.Petersburg

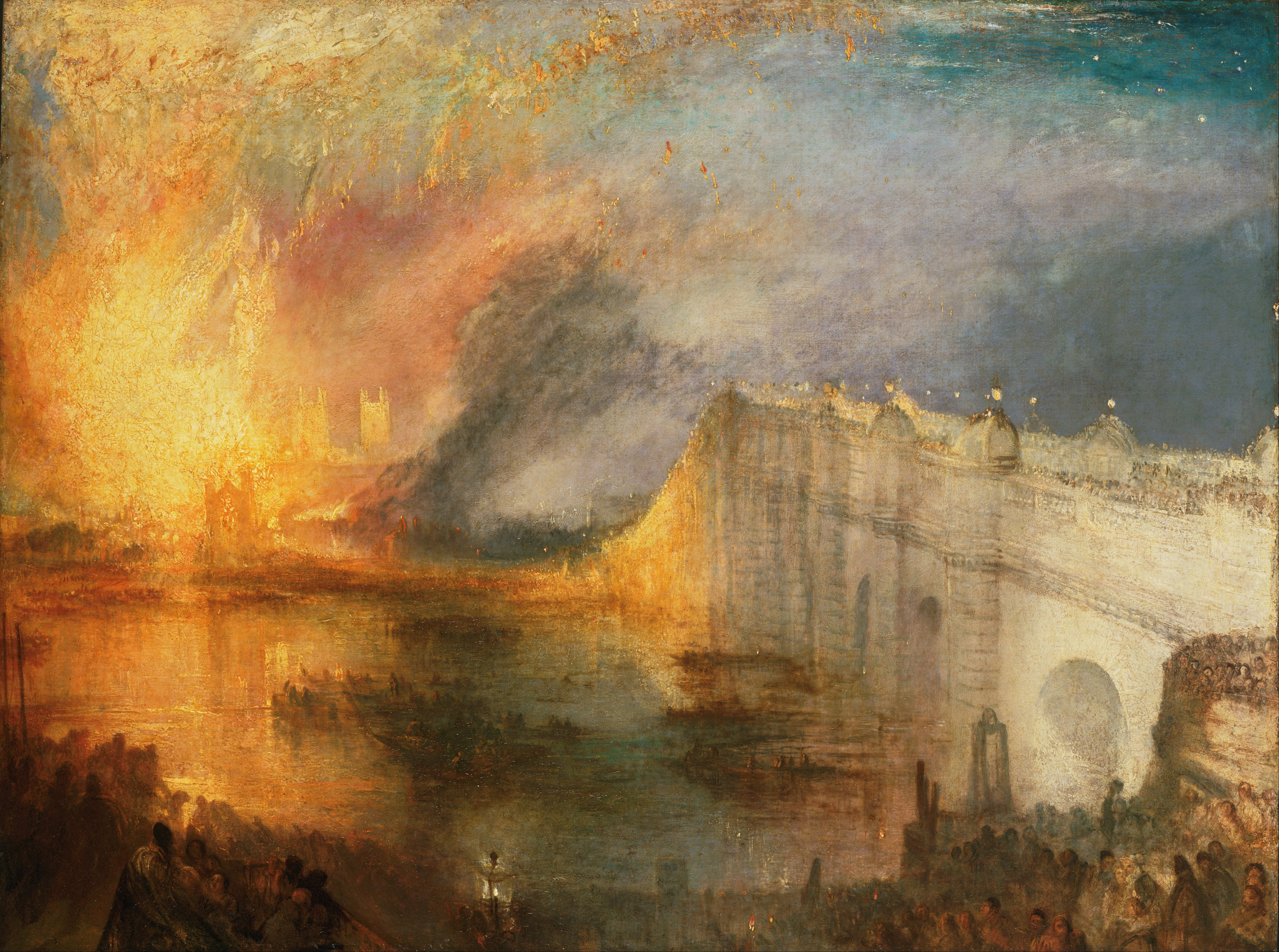
J. M. W. Turner, The Burning of the Houses of Lords and Commons (1835), Philadelphia Museum of Art

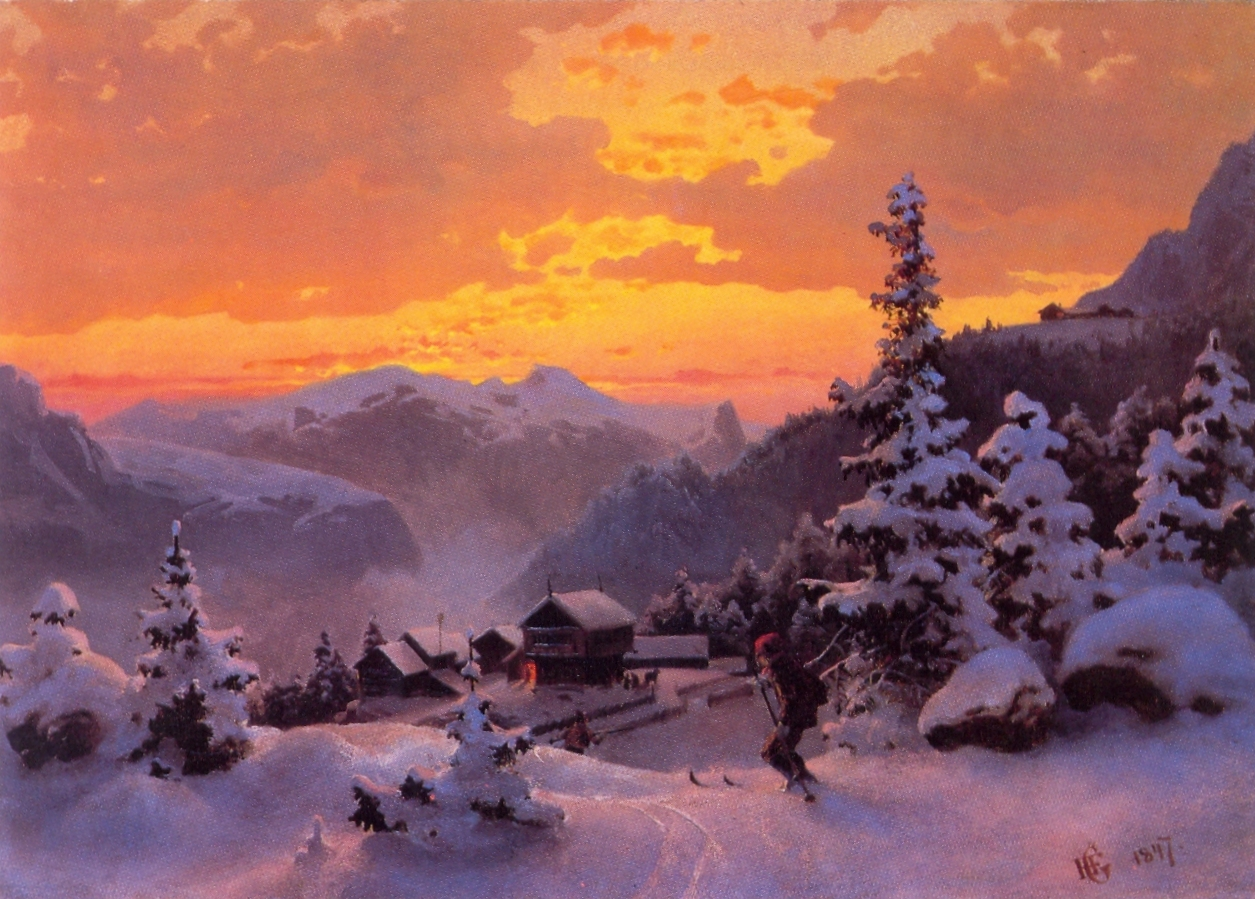
Hans Gude, Winter Afternoon, 1847, National Gallery of Norway, Oslo

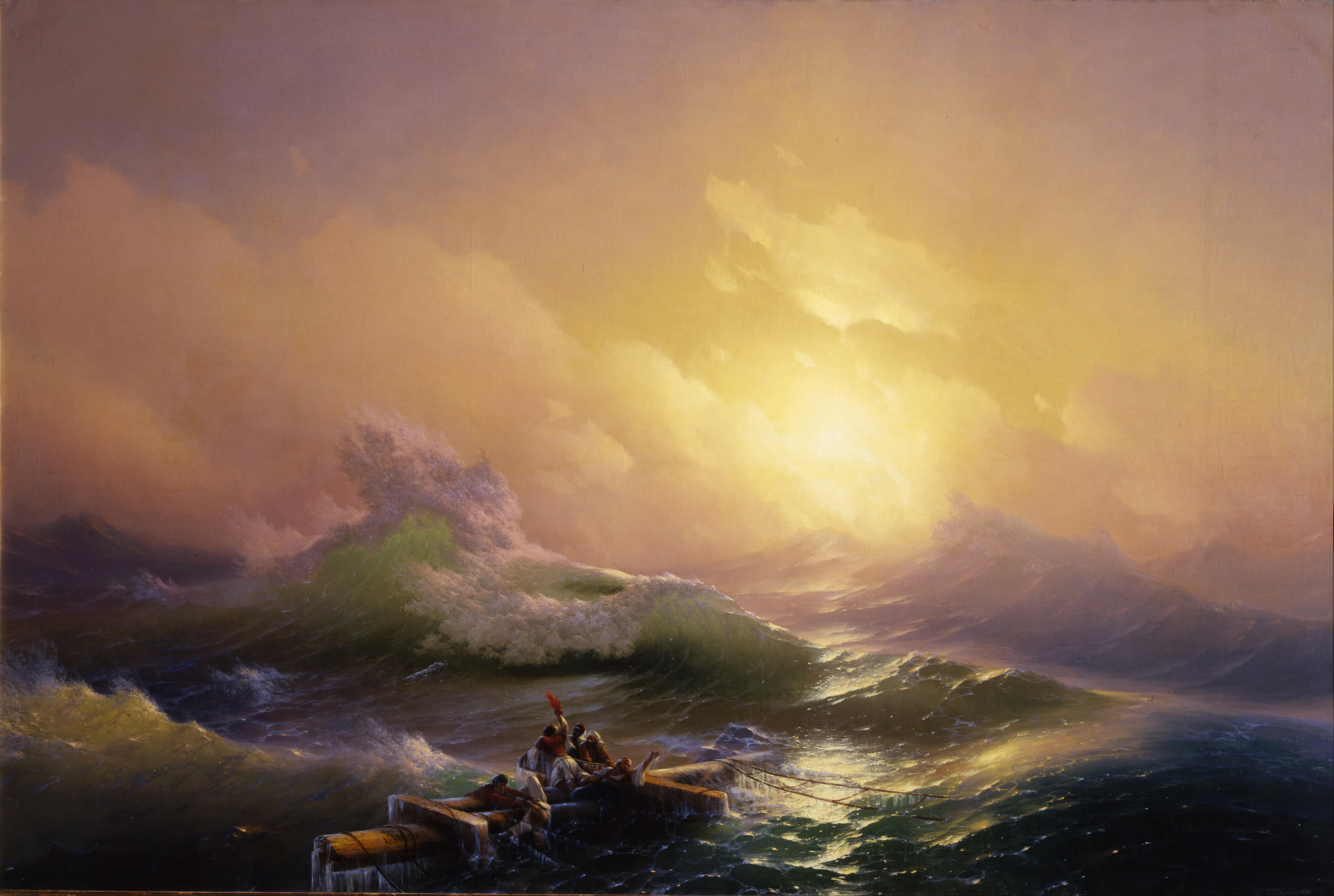
Ivan Aivazovsky, 1850, The Ninth Wave, Russian Museum, St. Petersburg

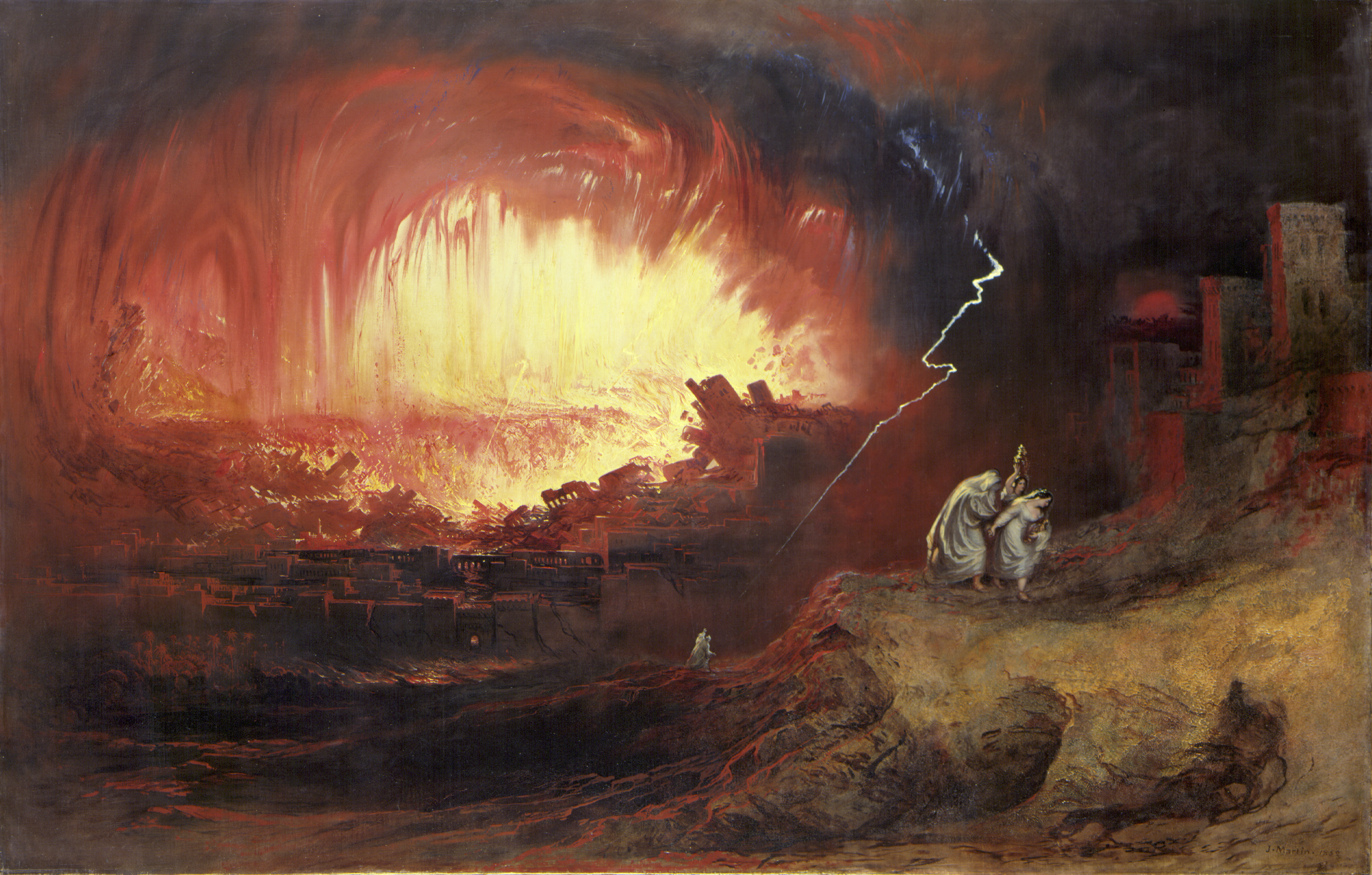
John Martin, 1852, The Destruction of Sodom and Gomorrah, Laing Art Gallery

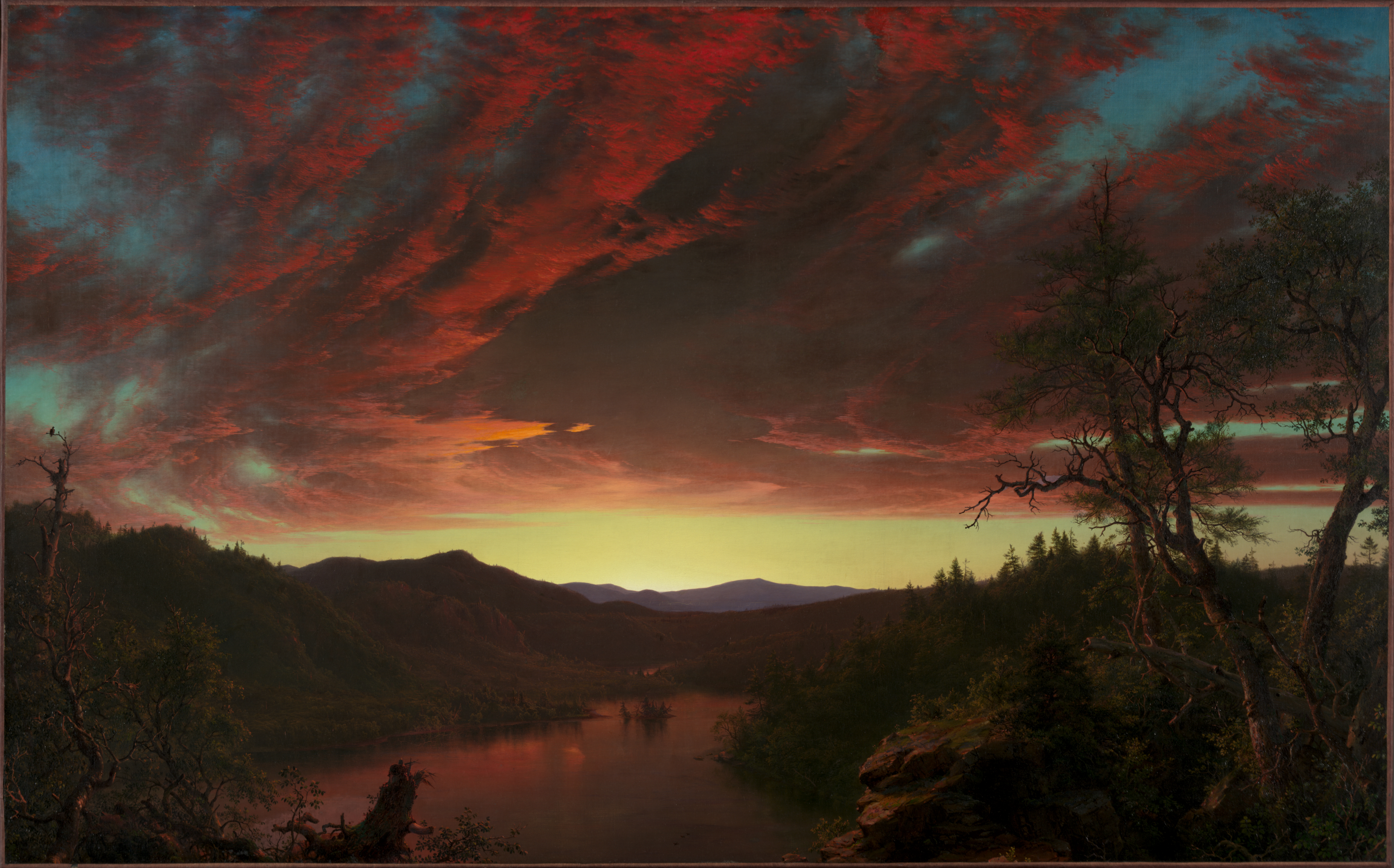
Frederic Edwin Church, 1860, Twilight in the Wilderness, Cleveland Museum of Art

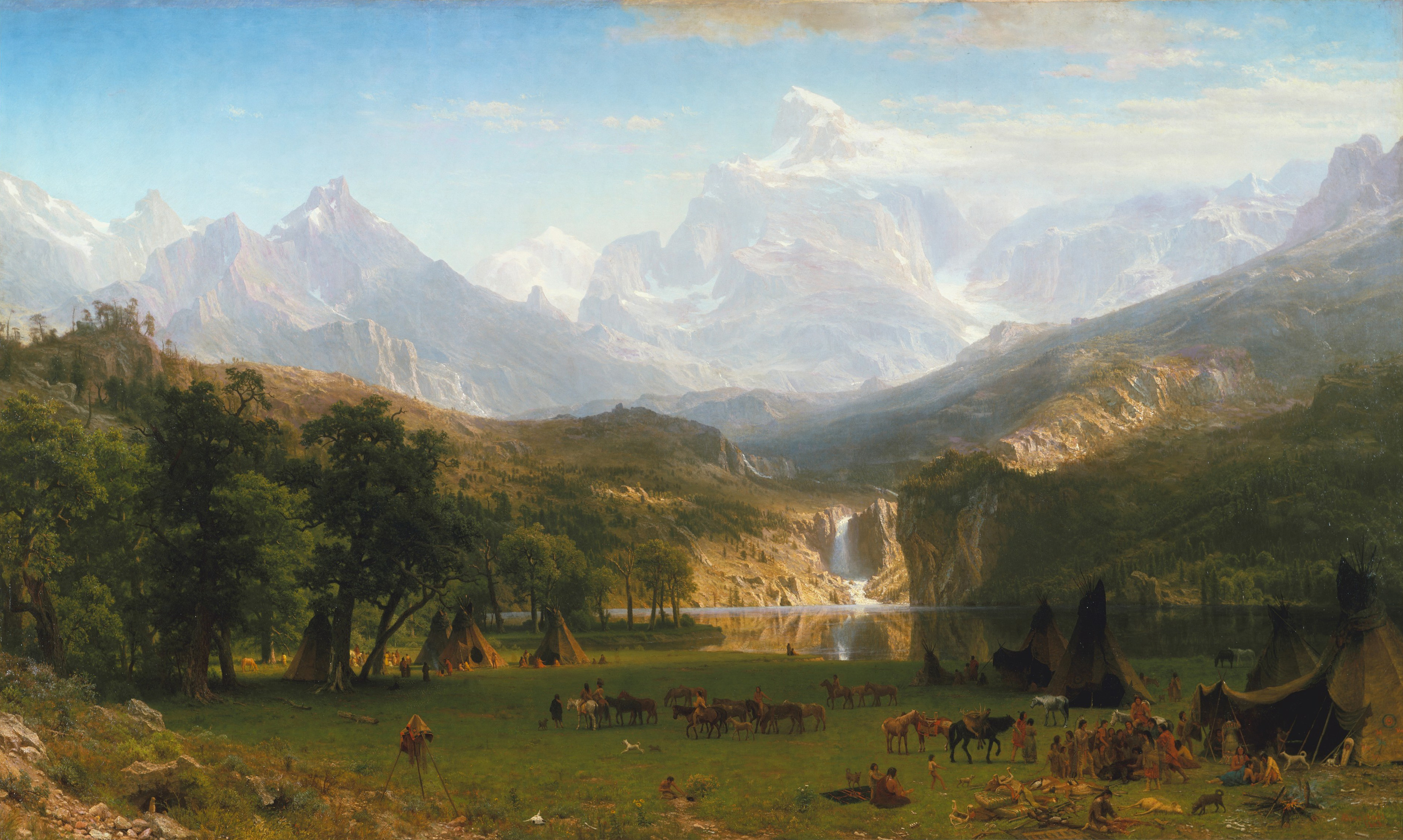
Albert Bierstadt, 1863, The Rocky Mountains, Lander's Peak

== Romantic writers ==
- Manuel Antônio de Almeida
- Castro Alves
- Machado de Assis
- Casimiro de Abreu
- Álvares de Azevedo
- Nikoloz Baratashvili
- Gustavo Adolfo Bécquer
- William Blake
- Anne Brontë
- Charlotte Brontë
- Emily Brontë
- Robert Burns
- Lord Byron
- Thomas Carlyle
- Alexander Chavchavadze
- Samuel Taylor Coleridge
- Gonçalves Dias
- Emily Dickinson
- Alexandre Dumas
- Maria Edgeworth
- Joseph von Eichendorff
- Ralph Waldo Emerson
- Mihai Eminescu
- Ugo Foscolo
- Aleksander Fredro
- Johann Wolfgang von Goethe
- Nikolai Gogol
- Brothers Grimm
- Bernardo Guimarães
- Wilhelm Hauff
- Nathaniel Hawthorne
- E. T. A. Hoffmann
- Klementyna Hoffmanowa
- Josiah Gilbert Holland
- Victor Hugo
- Washington Irving
- Jean Paul
- John Keats
- Laza Kostić
- Zygmunt Krasiński
- Józef Ignacy Kraszewski
- Mikhail Lermontov
- Joaquim Manuel de Macedo
- Alessandro Manzoni
- Herman Melville
- Prosper Mérimée
- Adam Mickiewicz
- Gérard de Nerval
- Cyprian Kamil Norwid
- Novalis
- Grigol Orbeliani
- Petar II Petrović-Njegoš
- Edgar Allan Poe
- Wincenty Pol
- Alexander Pushkin
- Ann Radcliffe
- Ion Heliade Rădulescu
- Mary Robinson
- George Sand
- August Wilhelm von Schlegel
- Friedrich von Schlegel
- Walter Scott
- Mary Shelley
- Percy Bysshe Shelley
- Juliusz Słowacki
- Henry David Thoreau
- Ludwig Tieck
- Fagundes Varela
- Wilhelm Heinrich Wackenroder
- William Wordsworth

== Scholars of Romanticism ==
- Gerald Abraham
- M. H. Abrams
- Donald Ault
- Jacques Barzun
- Frederick C. Beiser
- Ian Bent
- Isaiah Berlin
- Tim Blanning
- Harold Bloom
- Friedrich Blume
- James Chandler
- Jeffrey N. Cox
- Carl Dahlhaus
- Northrop Frye
- Maria Janion
- Peter Kitson
- Philippe Lacoue-Labarthe
- Arthur Oncken Lovejoy
- Paul de Man
- Tilar J. Mazzeo
- Jerome McGann
- Anne K. Mellor
- Jean-Luc Nancy
- Ashton Nichols
- Leon Plantinga
- Christopher Ricks
- Charles Rosen
- René Wellek
- Susan J. Wolfson

== See also ==
=== Related terms ===
- Goethean science
- Humboldtian science
- Sentimentalism (literature)

=== Opposing terms ===
- The Academy
- Positivism
- Utilitarianism

=== Related subjects ===
- Coleridge's theory of life
- Dark Romanticism
- List of romantics
- Mal du siècle
- Middle Ages in history
- Neo-romanticism
  - Post-romanticism
- Opium and Romanticism
- Plagiarism and Literary Property in the Romantic Period
- Political romanticism
- Romantic ballet
- Romantic epistemology
- Romantic hero
- Romantic medicine
- Romantic philosophy
- Romantic poetry
  - List of Romantic poets
- Romantic psychology

=== Related movements ===
- Aestheticism
- Arts and Crafts movement
- Decadent movement
- Düsseldorf School
- Pre-Raphaelite Brotherhood
- Symbolist Movement
- Vegetarianism and Romanticism
- Victorian literature
- Marxist-Leninist views on Romanticism
- Underground culture
