= Coleridge's theory of life =

In awe of nature

Coleridge's theory of life is an attempt by Samuel Taylor Coleridge to understand not just inert or still nature, but also vital nature. He examines this topic most comprehensibly in his work Hints towards the Formation of a more Comprehensive Theory of Life (1818). The work is key to understand the relationship between Romantic literature and science.

Works of romanticists in the realm of art and Romantic medicine were a response to the general failure of the application of the method of inertial science to reveal the foundational laws and operant principles of vital nature. German romantic science and medicine sought to understand the nature of the life principle identified by John Hunter as distinct from matter itself via Johan Friedrich Blumenbach's Bildungstrieb and Romantic medicine's Lebenskraft, as well as Röschlaub's development of the Brunonian system of medicine system of John Brown, in his excitation theory of life (German: Erregbarkeit theorie), working also with Schelling's Naturphilosophie, the work of Goethe regarding morphology, and the first dynamic conception of the physiology of Richard Saumarez.

== Context ==
The Enlightenment had developed a philosophy and science supported by formidable twin pillars: the first the Cartesian split of mind and matter, the second Newtonian physics, with its conquest of inert nature, both of which focused the mind's gaze on things or objects. For Cartesian philosophy, life existed on the side of the matter, not mind; and for the physical sciences, the method that had been so productive for revealing the secrets of inert nature should be equally productive in examining vital nature. The initial attempt to seek the cause and principle of life in the matter was challenged by John Hunter, who held that the principle of life was not to be found nor confined within matter, but existed independently of matter itself, and informed or animated it, that is, he implied, it was the unifying or antecedent cause of the things or what Aristotelian philosophy termed natura naturata.

This reduction of the question of life to matter, and the corollary, that the method of the inertial sciences was the way to understand the very phenomenon of life, that is, its very nature and essence as a power (natura naturans), not as manifestations through sense-perceptible appearances (natura naturata), also reduced the individual to a material-mechanical 'thing' and seemed to render human freedom an untenable concept. It was this that Romanticism challenged, seeking instead to find an approach to the essence of nature as being also vital not simply inert, through a systematic method involving not just physics, but physiology (living functions). For Coleridge, quantitative analysis was anti-realist and needed to be grounded in qualitative analysis ('-ologies') (as was the case with Goethe's approach).

At the same time, the Romantics had to deal with the idealistic view that life was a 'somewhat' outside of things, such that the things themselves lost any real existence, a stream coming through Hume and Kant, and also infusing the German natural philosophical stream, German idealism, and in particular, naturphilosophie, eventuating scientifically in the doctrine of 'vitalism'. For the Romantics, life is independent of and antecedent to nature, but also infused and suspended in nature, not apart from it, As David Bohm expresses it in more modern terms "In nature, nothing remains constant…everything comes from other things and gives rise to other things. This principle is…at the foundation of the possibility of our understanding nature in a rational way."

And as Coleridge explained, "this antecedent unity, or cause and principle of each union, it has since the time of Bacon and Kepler been customary to call a law." And as law, "we derive from it a progressive insight into the necessity and generation of the phenomena of which it is the law."

Coleridge's was the dominant mind on many issues involving the philosophy and science in his time, as John Stuart Mill acknowledged, along with others since who have studied the history of Romanticism.

The name of Coleridge is one of the few English names of our time which are likely to be oftener pronounced, and to become symbolical of more important things, in proportion as the inward workings of the age manifest themselves more and more in outward facts.

== The need for a new paradigm ==
For Coleridge, as for many of his romantic contemporaries, the idea that matter itself can beget life only dealt with the various changes in the arrangement of particles and did not explain life itself as a principle or power that lay behind the material manifestations, natura naturans or "the productive power suspended and, as it were, quenched in the product" Until this was addressed, according to Coleridge, "we have not yet attained to a science of nature."

This productive power is above sense experience, but not above nature herself, that is, supersensible, but not supernatural, and, thus, not 'occult' as was the case with vitalism. Vitalism failed to distinguish between spirit and nature, and then within nature, between the visible appearances and the invisible, yet very real and not simply hypothesized notion, essence or motivating principle (natura naturans). Even Newton spoke of things invisible in themselves (though not in their manifestations), such as force, though Comte, the thorough materialist, complained of the use of such terms as the 'force of gravity' as being relics of animism.

The matter was not a 'datum' or thing in and of itself, but rather a product or effect, and for Coleridge, looking at life in its broadest sense, it was the product of a polarity of forces and energies, but derived from a unity which is itself a power, not an abstract or nominal concept, that is Life, and this polar nature of forces within the power of Life is the very law or 'Idea' (in the Platonic sense) of Creation.

== Life as polarity/function/motion ==
For Coleridge, the essence of the universe is motion, and motion is driven by a dynamic polarity of forces that is both inherent in the world as potential and acting inherently in all manifestations. This polarity is the very dynamic that acts throughout all of nature, including into the more particular form of 'life biological', as well as of mind and consciousness.

The tendency having been ascertained, what is its most general law? I answer—polarity, or the essential dualism of Nature, arising out of its productive unity, and still tending to reaffirm it, either as equilibrium, indifference, or identity.

And this polarity is dynamic, that is real, though not visible, and not simply logical or abstract. Thus, the polarity results in manifestations that are real, as the opposite powers are not contradictory, but counteracting and inter-penetrating.

...first, that two forces should be conceived which counteract each other by their essential nature; not only not in consequence of the accidental direction of each, but as prior to all direction, nay, as the primary forces from which the conditions of all possible directions are derivative and deducible: secondly, that these forces should be assumed to be both alike infinite, both alike indestructible... this one power with its two inherent indestructible yet counteracting forces, and the results or generations to which their inter-penetration gives existence, in the living principle and the process of our own self-consciousness.

Thus, then, Life itself is not a thing—a self-subsistent hypostasis—but an act and process.

And in that sense Coleridge re-phrases the question "What is Life?" to "What is not Life that really is?"

This dynamic polar essence of nature in all its functions and manifestations is a universal law in the order of the law of gravity and other physical laws of inert nature. And, critically, this dynamic polarity of constituent powers of life at all levels is not outside or above nature, but is within nature (Natura naturans), not as a part of the visible product, but as the ulterior natural functions that produce such products or things.

a Power, acting in and by its Product or Representative to a predetermined purpose is a Function…

The first product of its energy is the thing itself… Still, however, its productive energy is not exhausted in this product, but overflows, or is effluent, as the specific forces, properties, faculties, of the product. It reappears, in short, as the function of the body.

It is these functions that provided the bridge being sought by Romantic science and medicine, in particular by Andreas Röschlaub and the Brunonian system of medicine, between the inertial science of inert nature (physics) and the vital science of vital nature (physiology) and its therapeutic application or physic (the domain of the physician).

=== Romanticism and vitalism ===
Coleridge was influenced by German philosophy, in particular Kant, Fichte and Schelling (Naturphilosophie), as well as the physiology of Blumenbach and the dynamic excitation theory of life of the Brunonian system. He sought a path that was neither the mystical tendency of the earlier vitalists nor the materialistic reductionist approach to natural science, but a dynamic one.

What Coleridge was after was definitely not animism or naive vitalism based on vital substance, or mechanical philosophy based on material substance. He was trying to find a general law...that explicates its self-regulating internal power.

Coleridge's challenge was to describe something that was dynamic neither in mystical terms nor materialistic ones, but via analogy, drawing from the examples of inertial science. As one writer explains, he uses the examples of electricity, magnetism and gravity not because they are like life, but because they offer a way of understanding powers, forces and energies, which lie at the heart of life. And using these analogies, Coleridge seeks to demonstrate that life is not a material force, but a product of relations amongst forces. Life is not linear and static, but dynamic process of self-regulation and Emergent evolution that results in increasing complexity and individuation. This spiral, upward movement (cf. Goethe's ideas) creates a force for organization that unifies, and is most intense and powerful in that which is most complex and most individual - the self-regulating, enlightened, developed individual mind. But at the same time, this process of life increases interdependence (like the law of comparative advantage in economics) and associational powers of the mind. Thus, he is not talking about an isolated, individual subjective mind, but about the evolution of a higher level of consciousness and thought at the core of the process of life.

== Life and liberty ==
And the direction of this motion is towards increasing individuation, that is the creation of specific, individual units of things. At the same time, given the dynamic polarity of the world, there must always be an equal and opposite tendency, in this case, that of connection. So, a given of our experience is that man is both an individual, tending in each life and in history generally to greater and greater individualization, and a social creature seeking interaction and connection. It is the dynamic interplay between the individuation and connecting forces that leads to higher and higher individuation.

By Life I everywhere mean the true Idea of Life,… the tendency to individuation… [which] cannot be conceived without the opposite tendency to connect, even as the centrifugal power supposes the centripetal, or as the two opposite poles constitute each other, and are the constituent acts of one and the same power in the magnet…. Again, if the tendency be at once to individuate and to connect, to detach, but so as either to retain or to reproduce attachment, the individuation itself must be a tendency to the ultimate production of the highest and most comprehensive individuality. This must be the one great end of Nature, her ultimate object, or by whatever other word we may designate that something which bears to a final cause the same relation that Nature herself bears to the Supreme Intelligence.

== Creative life and vital nature ==
Coleridge makes a further distinction between mathematics and life, the latter being productive or creative, that is, living, and the former ideal. Thus, the mathematical approach that works so well with inert nature, is not suitable for vital nature.

In its productive power, of which the product is the only measure, consists its incompatibility with mathematical calculus. For the full applicability of an abstract science ceases, the moment reality begins.

This productive or generative power of life exists in all manifestations of life. These manifestations are the finite product of the dynamic interaction of infinite and non-destructible forces, but the forces are not extinguished in the product - they take on a different role, namely that of functions. Thus, the very nature of the “given” is contained in its manifestations such that the whole is contained in all the parts.

The counteraction then of the two assumed forces does not depend on their meeting from opposite directions; the power which acts in them is indestructible; it is therefore inexhaustibly re-ebullient; and as something must be the result of these two forces, both alike infinite, and both alike indestructible; and as rest or neutralization cannot be this result; no other conception is possible, but that the product must be a tertium aliquid, [a third thing] or finite generation. Consequently, this conception is necessary. Now this tertium aliquid can be no other than an inter-penetration of the counteracting powers, partaking of both... Consequently, the 'constituent powers', that have given rise to a body, may then reappear in it as its function: "a Power, acting in and by its Product or Representative to a predetermined purpose is a Function...the first product of its energy is the thing itself: ipsa se posuit et iam facta est ens positum. Still, however, its productive energy is not exhausted in this product, but overflows, or is effluent, as the specific forces, properties, faculties, of the product. It reappears, in short, as the function of the body...The vital functions are consequents of the Vis Vitae Principium Vitale, and presuppose the Organs, as the Functionaries.

Life, that is, the essential polarity in unity (multeity in unity) in Coleridge’s sense also has a four beat cycle, different from the arid dialectics of abstraction - namely the tension of the polar forces themselves, the charge of their synthesis, the discharge of their product (indifference) and the resting state of this new form (predominance). The product is not a neutralization, but a new form of the essential forces, these forces remaining within, though now as the functions of the form.

But as little can we conceive the oneness, except as the mid-point producing itself on each side; that is, manifesting itself on two opposite poles. Thus, from identity we derive duality, and from both together we obtain polarity, synthesis, indifference, predominance. (BL)

To make it adequate, we must substitute the idea of positive production for that of rest, or mere neutralization. To the fancy alone it is the null-point, or zero, but to the reason it is the punctum saliens, and the power itself in its eminence.

== Life and matter ==
This dynamic polarity that is Life is expressed at different levels. At its most basic it is Space-Time, with its product - motion. The interplay of both gives us either a line or a circle, and then there are different degrees possible within a given form or “predominance” of forces. Geometry is not conceivable except as the dynamic interplay of space (periphery) and time (point). Space, time and motion are also geometrically represented by width, length (breadth) and depth. And this correspondence is repeated throughout the scale of Life.

We have been thus full and express on this subject, because these simple ideas of time, space, and motion, of length, breadth, and depth, are not only the simplest and universal, but the necessary symbols of all philosophic construction. They will be found the primary factors and elementary forms of every calculus and of every diagram in the algebra and geometry of a scientific physiology. Accordingly, we shall recognise the same forms under other names; but at each return more specific and intense; and the whole process repeated with ascending gradations of reality, exempli gratiâ: Time + space = motion; Tm + space = line + breadth = depth; depth + motion = force; Lf + Bf = Df; LDf + BDf = attraction + repulsion = gravitation; and so on, even till they pass into outward phenomena, and form the intermediate link between productive powers and fixed products in light, heat, and electricity.

Matter, then, is the product of the dynamic forces - repulsion (centrifugal), and attraction (centripetal); it is not itself a productive power. It is also the mass of a given body.

If we pass to the construction of matter, we find it as the product, or tertium aliquid, of antagonist powers of repulsion and attraction. Remove these powers, and the conception of matter vanishes into space—conceive repulsion only, and you have the same result. For infinite repulsion, uncounteracted and alone, is tantamount to infinite, dimensionless diffusion, and this again to infinite weakness; viz., to space. Conceive attraction alone, and as an infinite contraction, its product amounts to the absolute point, viz., to time. Conceive the synthesis of both, and you have matter as a fluxional antecedent, which, in the very act of formation, passes into body by its gravity, and yet in all bodies it still remains as their mass...

Coleridge's understanding of life is contrasted with the materialist view which is essentially reduced to defining life as that which is the opposite of not-life, or that which resists death, that is, that which is life.

By an easy logic, each of the two divisions has been made to define the others by a mere assertion of their assumed contrariety. The theorist has explained Y+X by informing us that it is the opposite of Y-X: and if we ask, what then is Y-X, we are told that it is the opposite of Y+X! A reciprocation of good services....I turn to a work by the eminent French physiologist, Bichat, where I find this definition: Life is the sum of all the functions by which death is resisted....that is, that life consists in being able to live!...as if four more inveterate abstractions could be brought together than the words life, death, function, and resistance.

== Cognition and life ==
The problem for Coleridge and the Romantics was that the intellect, 'left to itself' as Bacon stated, was capable of apprehending only the outer forms of nature (natura naturata) and not the inmost, living functions (natura naturans) giving rise to these forms. Thus, effects can only be 'explained' in terms of other effects, not causes. It takes a different capacity to 'see' these living functions, which is an imaginative activity. For Coleridge, there is an innate, primitive or 'primary' imagination that configures invisibly sense-experience into perception, but a rational perception, that is, one raised into consciousness and awareness and then rationally presentable, requires a higher level, what he termed 'secondary imagination', which is able to connect with the thing being experienced, penetrate to its essence in terms of the living dynamics upholding its outer form, and then present the phenomena as and within its natural law, and further, using reason, develop the various principles of its operation.

This cognitive capacity involved what Coleridge termed the 'inmost sense' or what Goethe termed the Gemüt. It also involved the reactivation of the old Greek noetic capacity, and the ability to 'see' or produce the theory (Greek theoria from the verb 'to see') dynamic polarities, or natural Laws, the dynamic transcendent (foundational) entities that Plato termed 'Ideas' (eidos).

Since natura naturata is sustained by natura naturans, and the creative power of natura naturans is one of a kind with the human mind, itself creative, then there must be a correspondence or connection between the mind and the things we perceive, such that we can overcome the apparent separation between the object and the representation in the mind of the object that came to bedevil Enlightenment thought (Hume, Kant). As one commentator noted "to speak at all of the unity of intelligence and nature is of course flatly to contradict Descartes."

== Life and evolution ==
For Coleridge the power of life lies in every seed as a potential to be unfolded as a result of interaction with the environment (heat, light, air, moisture, etc.), an insight which allowed him to see in the Brunonian system a dynamic polarity in excitation theory.

Coleridge also saw that there was a progressive movement through time and space of life or the law of polarity, from the level of physics (space and time) and the mineral or inert nature (law of gravity, operating through forces of attraction and repulsion), up to man, with his law of resonance in terms of his innate desire to be himself (force of individuation) and to also connect with like-minded (force of connection), as Goethe expressed in his novel Elective Affinities (Wahlverwandschaften) as well as in his own life's experience.

Evolution occurred because the original polarity of creation, the very 'Law of Creation', itself gives birth to subsequent polarities, as each pole is itself a unity that can be further polarized (what Wilhelm Reich later termed 'orgonomic functionalism' and what at the biological level constitutes physiology), an insight that would later be taken up by the concept of emergent evolution, including the emergence of mind and consciousness.

the productive power, or vis naturans, which in the sensible world, or natura naturata, is what we mean by the word, nature, when we speak of the same as an agent, is essentially one (that is, of one kind) with the intelligence, which is in the human mind above nature."

And that this is so, is also an intimate and shared experience of all humans, as is set out in Reid's Common Sense philosophy. As Coleridge states

but for the confidence which we place in the assertions of our reason and our conscience, we could have no certainty of the reality and actual outness of the material world.

That nature evolves towards a purpose, and that is the unfolding of the human mind and consciousness in all its levels and degrees, is not teleological but a function of the very nature of the law of polarity or creation itself, namely that of increasing individuation of an original unity, what Coleridge termed 'multeity in unity'. As he states, "without assigning to nature as nature, a conscious purpose" we must still "distinguish her agency from a blind and lifeless mechanism."

While man contains and is subject to the various laws of nature, man as a self-conscious being is also the summa of a process of creation leading to greater mind and consciousness, that is, a creative capacity of imagination. Instead of being a creature of circumstance, man is the creator of them, or at least has that potential.

Naked and helpless cometh man into the world. Such has been the complaint from eldest time; but we complain of our chief privilege, our ornament, and the connate mark of our sovereignty. Porphyrigeniti summus! …Henceforth he is referred to himself, delivered up to his own charge…

== See also ==
- Romantic epistemology
- Superseded scientific theories
