= Irvin Ehrenpreis =

American literary scholar (1920–1985)

- Born: June 9, 1920; New York City
- Died: July 3, 1985; Münster
- Education: City College of New York (AB, 1938); Columbia University (MA, 1939; PhD, 1944)
- Employer(s): Indiana University Bloomington (1945–1965); University of Virginia (1965–1985)
- Awards: Guggenheim Fellowship (1955); Guggenheim Fellowship (1961); honorary doctor of the Marie and Louis Pasteur University (1965)

Irvin Ehrenpreis (June 9, 1920 – July 3, 1985) was an American literary scholar. From 1975 to 1985, he was the Linden Kent Memorial Professor of English Literature at the University of Virginia. Ehrenpreis was considered an expert on Jonathan Swift and also wrote on contemporary American literature.

== Early life and education ==
Irvin Ehrenpreis was born on June 9, 1920, in New York City, to Edith (Lipman) and Louis Ehrenpreis. He received a bachelor's degree from City College (now City College of New York) in 1938 and a master's and doctorate from Columbia University in 1939 and 1944, respectively.

== Career ==
Ehrenpreis taught at Indiana University Bloomington from 1945 to 1965. While on the Indiana faculty, he held two Guggenheim Fellowships in the biography category, in 1955 and 1961.

He came to the University of Virginia in 1965, where he was the Commonwealth Professor from 1967 to 1985 and the Linden Kent Memorial Professor of English Literature from 1975 to 1985. He was elected a corresponding fellow of the British Academy in 1985 and was a fellow of the American Academy of Arts and Sciences.

He was considered an expert on Jonathan Swift, about whom he wrote a three-volume biography, and also wrote on the work of Alexander Pope. In Literary Meaning and Augustan Values, he argued that the concept of organic form should not be applied to English literature of the 18th century.

Ehrenpreis also wrote on contemporary literature. He called the mid-20th century the "Age of Lowell", referring to the poet Robert Lowell, and edited a book on Wallace Stevens. In 1984, he wrote a strong critique of Edward Said's The World, the Text, and the Critic in The New York Review of Books.

Ehrenpreis died on July 3, 1985, in Münster, then in West Germany, after a fall.

== Books ==
Unless otherwise noted, the items in this list are taken from the bibliography in Augustan Studies: Essays in Honor of Irvin Ehrenpreis, a Festschrift for Ehrenpreis published in 1985.

- The "Types" Approach to Literature (1945)
- The Personality of Jonathan Swift (1958)
- Swift: The Man, His Works, and the Age (three volumes, 1962–1983)
- Fielding: Tom Jones (1964)
- Literary Meaning and Augustan Values (1974)
- Acts of Implication: Suggestion and Covert Meaning in the Works of Dryden, Swift, Pope and Austen (1980)

== Sources ==
- Fischer, John Irwin (1986). "Dividing to Conquer: The Achievement of Ehrenpreis's Swift: The Man, His Works, and the Age". The Eighteenth Century. 27 (1): 71–80. ISSN 0193-5380. JSTOR 41467372.
- Patey, Douglas Lane; Keegan, Timothy, eds. (1985). Augustan Studies: Essays in Honor of Irvin Ehrenpreis. University of Delaware Press. ISBN 0-87413-272-X. OCLC 12163162.
