= Lutze =

Lutze is a German surname. Notable people with the surname include:

- Arthur Lutze (1813–1870), German advocate of homeopathy
- Ernestine Lutze (1873–1948), German trade unionist and politician
- Lothar Lutze (1927–2015), German linguist
- Manuela Lutze (born 1974), German sculler
- Thomas Lutze (born 1969), German politician
- Viktor Lutze (1890–1943), German Nazi officer
