= Romantic medicine =

Medical aspect of Romanticism

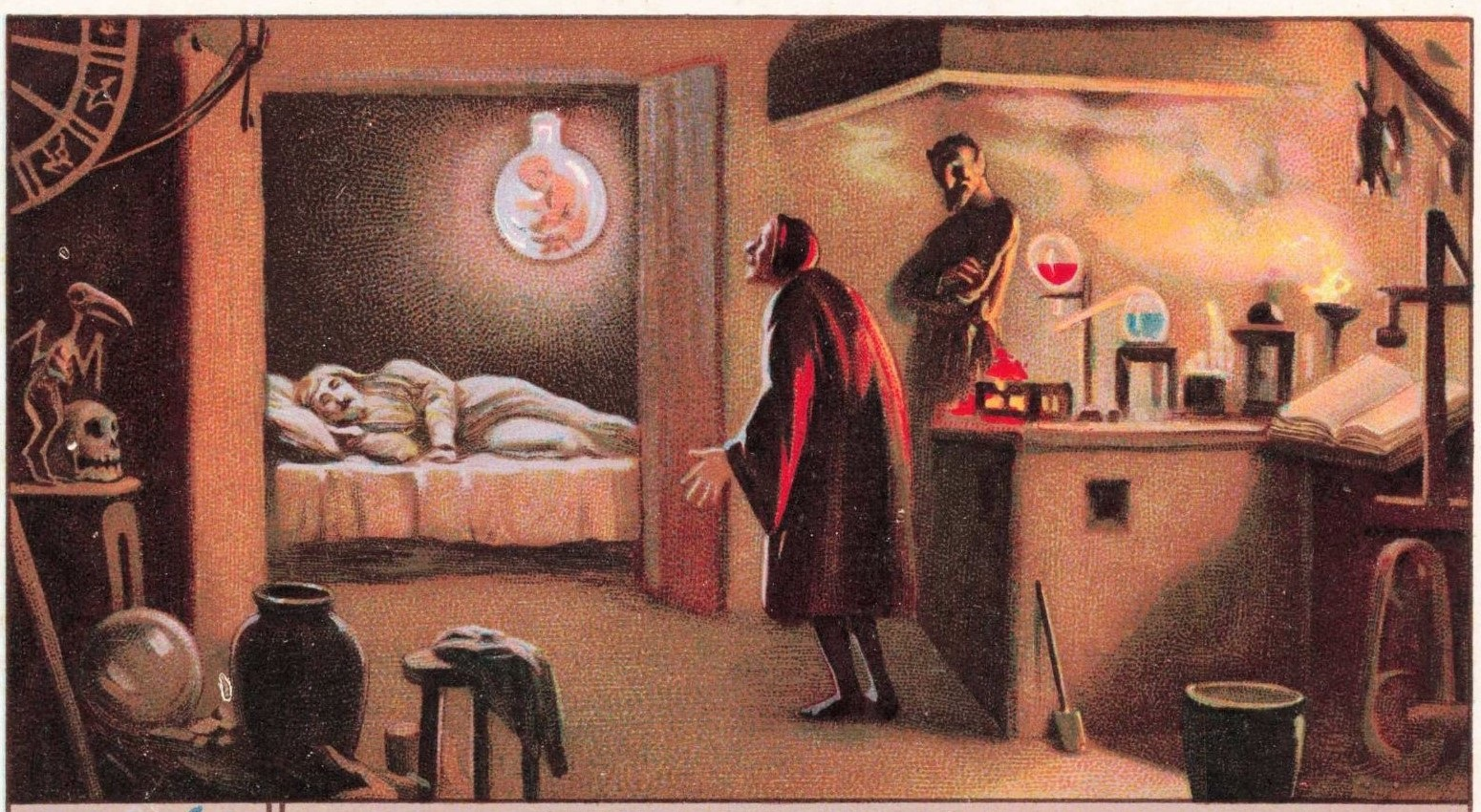
Scene from Goethe's Faust

Romantic medicine is part of the broader movement known as Romanticism, most predominant in the period 1800–1840, and involved both the cultural (humanities) and natural sciences, not to mention efforts to better understand man within a spiritual context ('spiritual science'). Romanticism in medicine was an integral part of Romanticism in science. Richard Sha of American University wrote in Romanticism on the Net:

Romantic writers were far better read in medicine than we tend to remember: Byron consulted popular health manuals by Adair and Solomon; Coleridge read deeply in his physician, James Gillman's, library; Percy Shelley ordered Spallanzani's complete works and immersed himself in the vitalist controversy, while Mary Shelley read Gall and Spurzheim; Blake engraved plates for medical literature published by Joseph Johnson; and Keats, of course, was trained as a physician.

The impetus for Romantic ideas in medicine came from Great Britain, and more specifically Scotland – John Hunter (1728–93) – and the idea of life as a principle not reducible to material constructs, and John Brown (1735–88), founder of the Brunonian system of medicine (see also, Romanticism in Scotland#Science). The nexus for Romantic Medicine was Germany, largely nurtured and guided by German natural scientific inquiries regarding the vital aspects of nature, such as that of Johann Friedrich Blumenbach (1752–1840) and his influential ideas regarding a life principle (Bildungstrieb), a formative drive (nisus formatives) as well as a philosophical tradition that emphasized the dynamic aspects of man and nature, and their essential relationship as part of a unity – German idealism and Naturphilosophie – all guided by Immanuel Kant's (1724–1804) challenge calling for critical inquiry as the basis for science.

The essence of romantic medicine was to overcome the deep crisis that Western medicine found itself in during the latter half of the 1700s by means of a science of life (pathology and physiology grounded in history) that went beyond the simple application of the method of the inertial sciences (physics and chemistry, grounded in mathematics) that had worked so well for inert nature, but was found wanting when applied to vital nature, but also a science of life that went beyond the idea of medicine as a subjective art largely to be left to individual practice. The Zeitgeist of Romantic medicine sought to unite the uneasy partnership of material natural science and subjective clinical practice to create a true scientific foundation for Western medicine (see also Romanticism and epistemology)

== The question of life ==
The issue of life – what is life? – or the scientific inquiry and quest (questio) regarding vital nature was one that increasingly drew the attention of philosophers and scientists in the 1700s, following the great advances concerning the laws and principles of inert nature - the Copernican, Galilean and Newtonian revolutions in celestial and earthly mechanics - astronomy and physics. With great confidence and optimism, philosophy and science turned to the mystery of life, or rather, that of health - how to restore and maintain it. Those most immediately drawn to this field were those who had some concern with health issues, physicians in particular. Thus, a natural alliance formed between natural philosophy and science on the one hand and medicine on the other. What they had in common was to advance the discipline of the study of living functions or physiology.

== Irritability ==
Because of the influence of the inertial sciences and the success of the method used to gain knowledge of the laws and principles applying to inert nature, the initial approach was to apply the same method to vital nature. What emerged from this was the extensive study in the first part of the 1700s of 'irritability', this being based on the central nervous system and involving physical forces such as electricity and magnetism.

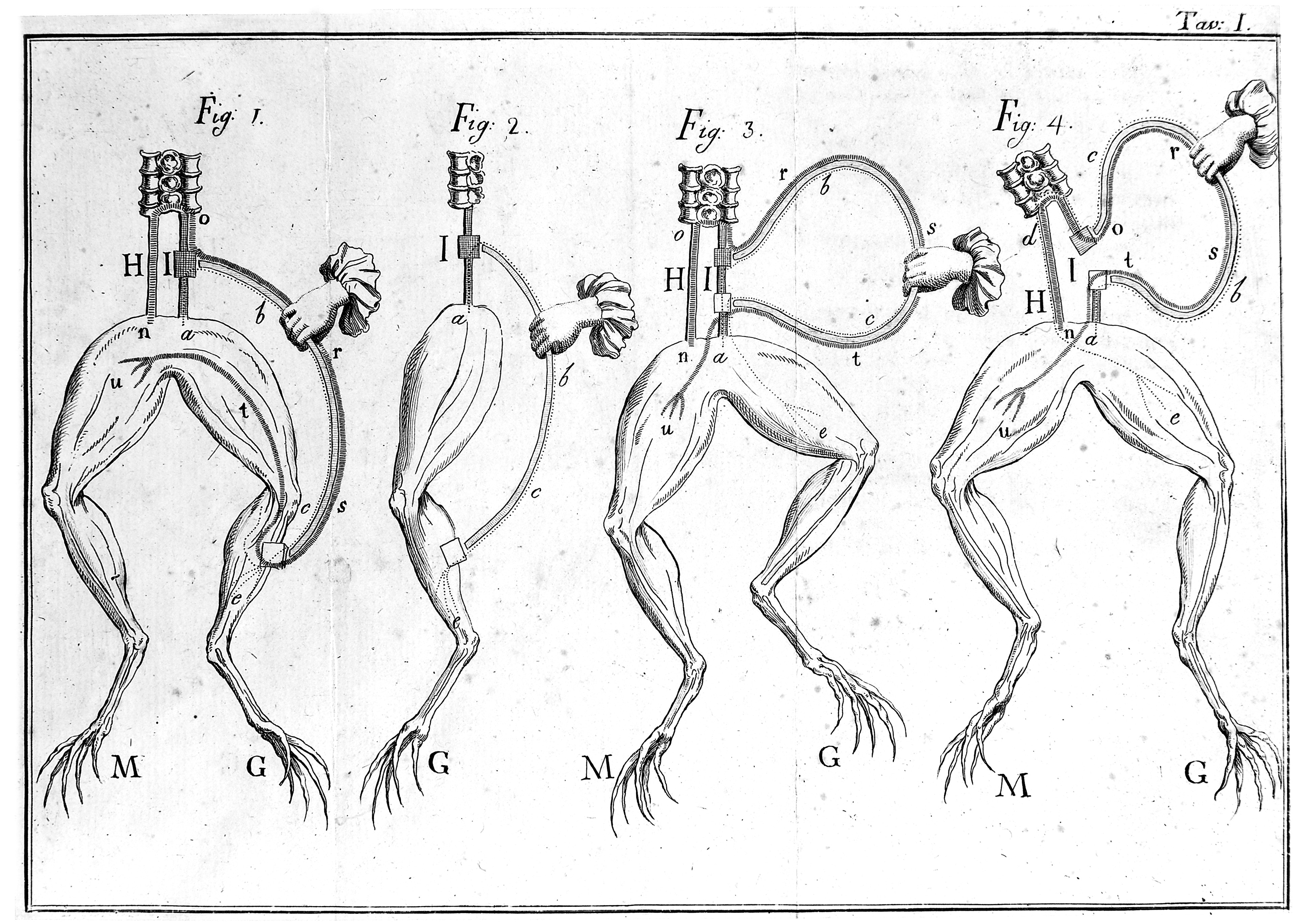
Experiments on the galvanic irritability of frog legs using electrodes, a cornerstone of Luigi Galvani's theories.

However, the mechanico-material explanation was not fruitful when it came to actually dealing with life in the case of healthcare practitioners. Albrecht von Haller's (1708–77) 'irritability' hypothesis and its failure adequately to explain the phenomenon of life, as well as the waning capacity of the Western mentality to participate living nature that lay at the root of the Hippocratic system of humours (or noetic capacities), led to a split between those who clung to the ancient tradition, but in name only (becoming routinists or empiricists), and those, largely in the universities, who sought a (material-mechanical) scientific basis regarding life and medicine. This split led to a widely acknowledged crisis in Western 'medicine' in the latter half of the 1700s.

That medicine c. 1800 was caught in the throes of a foundational crisis is testified to by numerous sources and above all by the documented collective striving of all leading European countries to totally reform medicine. No later than the 1780s – as the sources clearly show – were the leading doctors aware of the critical situation.

This historical intersection materialized particularly after the discovery of galvanism by Luigi Galvani (1737–1798), an electricity intrinsic to living beings that sparked a fierce debate over its properties. The physicist Giovanni Aldini (1762–1834), Galvani's nephew, disseminated and vigorously supported his uncle's theories, famously performing public experiments on corpses to demonstrate the electrical fluid or vital force animating nature.

== Romantic medicine and dynamics ==
The attempt on the part of philosophers and scientists to come to grips with the question of life led to an emphasis away from mechanics or statics, to dynamics. Life was action, living movement, a manifestation of an underlying polarity in nature and the universe. Instead of seeing nature from a 'one-eyed, color blind' spectator perspective, what was needed was a perspective that was binocular and participative. Inertial science had advanced in man's understanding of inert nature, her outer form or shell, what Francis Bacon termed natura naturata (outer form or appearance). However, it was not capable of going beyond this to a more dynamic discernment or apperception of the living inner content of nature, the domain of life – life in general, not just life biological as Samuel Taylor Coleridge, at the philosophic core of the scientific effort to penetrate to natura naturans, put it, asking further “what is not life?” based on the understanding of life as a dynamic polarity between powers, forces and energies. As one observer wrote "Die eigentliche Lebenslehre der Romantik aber war: Polarität." But as he promptly adds: "Sie klingt uns überall entgegen, nicht nur in der Naturphilosophie."

=== The foundations ===
==== Bacon's Novum Organum ====
The groundwork for this intensive search to understand life was laid down by Francis Bacon, who sought to sweep clean the Augean stables of late medieval Scholasticism, with its increasingly obtuse and confused attempts to approach natura naturans (nature becoming or 'naturing') using the old Greek noetic capacity, already long lost to the Western mind and having gone underground into the arts, but also the nominalist straying into abstractions and refractions in their study of natura naturata via secondary phenomena as in Newton's study of color (cf. Goethe's Farbenlehre or Study of Color). Neither the Realists nor the Nominalists of late medieval scholasticism could handle the task before them, and Bacon sought, at the start of the Age of Science, to provide a method to approach nature's outer form rationally, but by means of a conscious use of man's higher faculty in the form of the ‘forethoughtful inquiry’ (‘lux siccum’), that is, an inquiry that brought a particular idea, itself evinced through the mind and the domain of true philosophy, namely, the "mind’s self-experience in the act of thinking" (Coleridge's Biographia Literaria), or epistemology. The Baconian approach was further developed by C.S. Peirce who made a distinction between induction and abduction: the latter being the method of discovering hypotheses, the former that of testing them.

==== Coleridge and the role of philosophy ====
Bacon's work provided what Coleridge termed ‘method’ – the derivation of laws or ideas to guide the mind (mens) in its observation of nature, out of which emerges understanding (concepts) and principles (reason). It is also the task of philosophy, as Coleridge emphasized, to "settle the nomenclature," as the key to science is terminology where one term is not synonymous with something else, as is the case in demotic language, but instead the term discloses its meaning and increases understanding and knowledge. This was further developed by Heidegger and phenomenology (such as with the term Veranlassung).

Greek philosophy (love of wisdom or sophia) later emerged as philology (love of the Logos) to interpret philosophical works. It is this penetration of nature using both the eductive (as opposed to the projective) arts (innate wisdom) and (Logos-backed) sciences to achieve a rational, conscious understanding of nature, both outer form and inner essence that those who became part of the Romantic movement in England and Germany in particular, were seeking. It is not surprising that Romanticism, a scientific endeavor and quest, involved the cultural sciences or humanities (epistemology, philology, literature, poetry, arts, etc.), as well as the natural sciences.

=== Search for method for vital nature ===
Romanticism rejected the application of the method that had worked so well for inert nature to the realm of living nature, or life biological. While living organisms contained a degree of a mineral, material nature amenable to being approached via the laws of material physics and chemistry, life itself could not thereby be satisfactorily explained. On the one side, the material scientists sought a solution in reducing the non-material or metaphysical to ‘just’ a manifestation of the material, essentially thereby ignoring that this did not at all account for life. On the other side, a part of the ‘Old School’, drawing from the Hippocratic humoral theory (involving non-mechanical, etheric concepts), sought to emphasize the non-physical or vital aspect of nature, which somehow existed above and outside of nature and directed its activities. The Romantic scientists and philosophers rejected both reductionist mechano-materialism (material natural science) and conflationist mystical-idealism (vitalism).

=== Locke, Fichte and German Idealism ===
Romanticism also involved a fundamental understanding of functional polarities as the basis for and essence of life as Idea, Law and Principle. One of these polarities in cultural history involved the seminal influence of the English genius and the germinal or gestational genius of German-language culture. Coleridge mentions this in his Essays on Method, and the theme is explored in D.E. Faulkner-Jones' The English Spirit.

The seminal ideas came from Francis Bacon regarding scientific method and from John Locke regarding the ideas of self-consciousness and mind. Locke set up a relationship between mind (subject) and outer world (object) wherein the mind is set in motion by objects producing sensations but also has an internal activity of its own (reflection) that acts on the sensations to create perception and conceptions. For Locke, the activity of mind is paramount, as for Bacon, and it is only through the activity of mind (consciousness) that the outer world can be ‘realized’ as causative and as actual. Identity for Locke lay in the capacity for the ‘I’ (consciousness) to unite disparate ‘deeds’ or actions of nature (as cognized by the mind), into a meaningful unity. For Locke, identity of self exists in nothing other than participation in life (the etheric) by means of fluctuating particles of matter rendered meaningful and real by acts of the mind and consciousness. The Romantics, as Locke, refused to accept the view that life is a product of “the chance whirlings of unproductive particles” (Coleridge).

Locke's ideas were taken up by Johann Fichte in Germany and developed into a philosophy of nature and natural science based on mind and consciousness, which he termed Wissenschaftslehre. Fichte, as so many of that time, was also inspired to challenge Kant's views on human freedom (constraints by material forces) and the limits to cognition, and sought this in Locke's emphasis on the mind and consciousness as the pivotal actor and creator of reality. For Fichte, selfhood (Ichheit) is an act not a thing or a substance, and being or identity consists in the acts of mind and self-consciousness, such that being and identity are co-operant. Fichte's work heavily influenced German philosophy and science, leading to a general system of thought known as German Idealism (including Schelling and Hegel), though this idealism would either end paradoxically in accepting the methods of material science for natural science (Naturphilosophie – Schelling), or in academic and lifeless dialectics (Hegel) that negate life rather than support it and used for political ends (Marxism).

=== The Idea of the living principle ===
Prior to Fichte's writings, the idea of life as a power and principle independent of and not reducible to matter or substance had been put forward in England and Scotland in the mid-1700s, by the philosopher Thomas Reid and John Hunter (surgeon), a highly influential anatomist and surgeon as well as an observational scientist in the true Baconian tradition. Hunter rested the idea of the life principle on solid observation of nature. For him, anatomy and structure, matter and form were simply outer expressions of a vital dynamics.

This idea found a receptive soil in German philosophy and eclectic medicine, as represented by Christoph Hufeland (1762–1836), which had developed the concept of a life force or energy (Lebenskraft) as well, but one that had remained largely speculative or metaphorical. In 1781, Johan Friedrich Blumenbach, a natural philosopher and researcher published his thoughts regarding the Bildungstrieb, a dynamic power that was evolutive, progressive, and creative. Blumenbach's work provided for the later important distinction (by Samuel Hahnemann) between a sustaining power (homeostasis) and a generative power (Erzeugungskraft), not just for procreation in all its myriad forms, but also creative acts of the mind, which Coleridge said involved the imagination (as opposed to fancy), both primary (unconscious figuration) involving perception, and secondary, the latter leading to apperceptive concepts as a result of conscious acts of the mind (ideas applied to perceptions).

All of this set up a climate for ideas and concepts that went beyond the mechanistic method of inertial science, one that allowed a role for creative actions of the mind (works of art) as well as reactions to sensations involving objects. Equally, the climate was conducive to considering a dynamic between subject (self and mind/consciousness) and object, one in which the mind is both receptive and pro-active, and also one in which the mind is critical to determining the meaning and reality of any given stimulation from the world outside.

=== Crisis in medicine ===
By the end of the 1700s, medicine, not only in Germany, but throughout Europe, was in a deep crisis. This widely acknowledged crisis was brought into stark relief in 1795 in a famous critical essay by a German physician and philosopher, Johann Benjamin Erhard (1766–1827), in the ‘shot’ that was heard around the medical world. "Erhard's attack focused on what he called the "uncertainty" of medical knowledge and its failure to measure up to the criteria of a philosophical Wissenschaft. He located the central problem in doctors' lack of a clear idea either of illness in general or of particular diseases."

== The 'elements' of a new system ==
Johann B. Erhard's essay, coupled with the earlier introduction of the Brunonian system into German medical circles, almost immediately triggered a remarkable surge of writings by a graduating medical student, Andreas Röschlaub. Röschlaub wrote his doctoral dissertation on the work of a rather obscure and then little known Scottish physician, John Brown, Elementa Medicinae. Almost at the same time, in 1796, a German physician, Samuel Friedrich Hahnemann, who had been highly critical of the medical practices of his day, published a remarkable essay on the treatment of disease that became the foundation for the homeopathic approach to medicine, as part of a more comprehensive scientific approach for therapeutics he termed Heilkunde, and then later Heilkunst (Lesser Writings, p. 251).

While Brown's work had been available in Germany for almost 15 years, since its publication in 1780, it had been mostly ignored or rejected, as in England itself, because the method outlined by Brown was seen as a mechanical approach, which hardly endeared it to the German philosophical tradition and mindset seeking a more dynamic, vital approach. However, Röschlaub grasped, where no one else had been able, even Schelling with his Naturphilosophie, that Brown had provided the very elements of an approach to health and sickness that were dynamic in nature and by means of a synthetic concept – 'excitation' – that was the practical application of a Lockean and Fichtean approach to the problem of cognition due to subject/object or observer/observed, to the problem of the relationship between qualitative and quantitative, and also to the very problem of life itself. "Brunonian doctrine therefore fulfilled Erhard's call for a medical practice based on the "real" causes of disease rather than on divination of the meaning of symptoms. ... where Erhard had offered only criticism, Brunonianism offered an alternative. Brunonianism now stood ready to complete what Erhard had begun, and to inaugurate a revolution in German medicine."

=== Röschlaub and the general theory of disturbance and disorder ===
Through Röschlaub's writings, mainly between 1795 and 1806, Brown's conception of life was brought out: as a potential in us that is brought into action and reality as a result of the workings of the actual (excitants or stimulants) on us, and of the living principle as a receptive potentiality (‘excitability’, or the capacity to be impinged upon) and pro-active ('excitement', or the capacity to respond to impingements), that is, as a dynamic power.

Brown's use in the original Latin of 'incitability' (rather than the more restricted term used in the English – 'excitability') contained the germ of a distinction between the sustentive (Lebenskraft) and generative (Bildungstrieb) powers, as Coleridge astutely noted: “Brown has not proved that the Incitability itself cannot be altered – not merely thro’ incitement – but unmittlebar [unmediated]– Says the Jena recensent, Feb. 1799, No. 48 (Notebooks 1:38). He might have been thinking of Brown's discussion of contagious diseases wherein we see this interplay between the general action (‘affection’) of the sustentive power (excitability/excitement) and the more specific and different action of ‘contagions’ (e.g., LXXVI: “Contagious diseases are] not an exception...because...no general affection follows the application of contagion, if no undue excess or defect of excitement is the consequence..."), or his reference to a pro-creative as well as sustaining power as in CCCXXVI (“every living system lives in that which it procreates…that the system of nature remains and maintains an eternal vigour”).

When added to his distinction between beneficial (‘agreeable’) and harmful (malignities) ‘excitants’, Brown provided the basis for understanding how the level of excitability/incitability (potential) can be shifted upwards (potentiated). Finally, Brown introduced the powerful idea that pathology (unhealthy function) was simply physiology (healthy function) extended beyond a certain range of sustainable variability or pulsation (a function of the polarities that constitute life).

Röschlaub worked initially with Fichtean insights and then Schelling and his Naturphilosophie, establishing a dynamic philosophical basis in natural science for medicine. However, he realized that medicine could not be restricted to natural science, even a dynamic science grounded in physiology (the germ of which was provided by Dr. Richard Saumarez in England in 1798, A New System of Physiology), but had an artistic/aesthetic side. In this regard, he made a distinction first between Wissenschaftslehre (natural science) and Heilkunde (the practical, clinical side of therapeutics), in which latter work he established the first teaching clinic, in concert with Dr. Markus, in Bamberg, Germany.

Röschlaub made a further distinction between biophysical (Heilkunde) and biomedical (Heilkunst). The second took him into the very dimension of life itself, the etheric, that is, beyond the physical, a dimension that required an entirely different organ of knowledge from the intellect or Sinn (mens) that was the foundation of both WissenschaftsHeillehre and Heilkunde, as the construction of a protocol entails arte. Unbeknownst to him, one of his countrymen had been working on the development and understanding of this new cognitive capacity, called the Gemüt. As a result, Goethe was able to ‘see’ (anschauende Erkenntnis) into the dynamic realm of nature (natura naturans) and comprehend the very movement behind the forms, and the very functions that determined a given form, including the dynamic archetype (Kraftwesen) out of which all forms of a given Idea (such as ‘plant’ or ‘animal’) emanated. It was Goethe who founded the science of morphology. Although Goethe termed this study Metamorphosenlehre, it was, more accurately stated, a pleomorphic process.

This new cognitive capacity is what was needed for the physician or Leibarts to go beyond the inner symptomatics and outer semiotics of a case as a basis for assessment and evaluation used by the Old School, and to avoid the pitfalls of the merely empirical approach. It was the task of the physician to draw out (‘educe’), and allow ‘to come forth’ (Heidegger's Veranlassung and Hervorbringung), the natural state of health of the individual so as to enable him to undertake his individualized higher purpose in life. Heilkunst was not simply another projective art form such as painting, music, sculpture or poetry, but an educative art, in which the artist, the Heilkünstler (Hahnemann), seeks to bring forth out of the tangle of illness and disease at all levels, the true physiological selfhood, the fully liberated (at liberty to follow his higher purpose or aspiration) and conscious (a super-conscious mind higher than ordinary or waking consciousness) man or mensch.

Röschlaub also realized that Brown had only provided the basic ‘elements’ of a method for the science of life, and that what was still needed was the overarching or archetypal function from which all other functions were derivable and given meaning and direction, and which would also then provide the very goal and purpose of medicine and health, the ‘positive’ as well as the ‘negative’ (removal of suffering) sides of healthcare. However, this overarching, archetypal function would have to wait until the 20th century for its discovery and elucidation by Dr. Wilhelm Reich (Super-imposition or Überlagerung) and Rudolf Steiner's Metamorphosis, the exponents of the underlying Kraftwesen.

=== Rasori and the theory of counterstimulus ===
While Röschlaub spearheaded the dynamic interpretation of John Brown's ideas in Germany, Giovanni Rasori (1766-1837) became the leading figure of this medical revolution in Italy. Rasori translated Brown's Elementa Medicinae into Italian and modified the original doctrine into his own theory of contrastimulus. This theory split diseases and therapeutic substances into 'sthenic' (stimulating) and 'asthenic' (debilitating or contrastimulating) categories. Rasori's system sparked a massive scientific debate across Southern Europe, mirroring the German Naturphilosophie debates by attempting to ground pathology in a dynamic, vitalistic framework rather than mechanical materialism.

=== Hahnemann and the special theory of disease ===
At the same time that Röschlaub embarked on his quest for a true science of life and health, a compatriot, Dr. Samuel Hahnemann, who had quit his medical practice earlier in protest against the lack of science and efficacy of the Old School and the empty 'metaschematisms' of the academic 'doctors', had also begun a similar quest for a true system of medicine. Hahnemann's essay of 1796 and subsequent writings, all part of an extended Organon der Heilkunst, laid down the basic foundation for a distinction between the sustentive (Lebenserhaltungskraft) [Aphorism 63, 205 fn., 262] and generative (Erzeugungskraft) [Aphorism 21-22] sides of the living principle, between physic, operating under the natural healing law of opposites (contraria contrarius), and medicine proper, operating under the natural curative law of similars (similia similibus), and between disease, a dynamica impingement on the generative power (degeneration), a derangement of the sustentive power, or disturbance of homeostasis.

Hahnemann further established various principles for the application of the law of similars, including a crucial distinction between diseases of a fixed nature (tonic diseases), and those of a variable nature, the basis for the later discovery by some of his followers of a dual remedy prescribing, each remedy addressing one ‘side’ of disease, the tonic and pathic sides. Hahnemann set out a comprehensive approach to the diagnosis and treatment of disease, including a nosology.

==== Details of Heilkunst ====
Hahnemann argued, logically, that the material effects of disease could not be their own cause (causa morbii). Disease was instead a dynamic affection of the generative power occasioned by a spirit-like morbid entity (Krankheitswesen) [Aphorisms 22, 28] that had the power to impinge upon the generative power of a human (Menschenkraftwesen) [Aphorism 289 fn.], acting as malignant ‘excitants’ in the Brunonian sense. However, this power depended on a susceptibility or receptivity (negative resonance) caused by weakening of the life force from various malignities (Brown's underlying diathesis).

The disease process consists of a dual action: the initial action (Eerstwirkung) [Aphorisms 70,62,64,65] of the disease agent, which impinges upon the generative power, which is generally imperceptible (such as the initial infection by the measles microbe), and the counter or after-action (Gegenwirkung [Aph. 63,112, 115], Nachwirkung) [Aph. 62,70, 71] of the sustentive power, which produces the various sufferings the patient complains about.

While the fixed nature of tonic diseases could be identified by discerning the underlying causal state of mind, along with a curative medicine based on fixed principles, the variable or pathic diseases could only be identified, along with their curative medicine, through the symptoms (suffering or pathos) produced by the disease in the patient. However, such an approach was problematic as a person could have more than one disease at a time (Aph. 40–44). This then required a principle to organize the symptoms into an identifiable complex (Inbegriff) correspondent to a given disease state. Just as each tonic disease has a unique state of mind disturbance, so does each pathic disease contain a unique disturbance of the thermal organization in man. This approach to pathic diseases Hahnemann termed homeopathy (from the Greek homoios and pathos, or similar suffering). This approach expanded empiricism from its limitation within the bounds of Erfahrung (experience of outer forms or natura naturata) to Erlebnis provings (experience via the life body of natura naturans).

The tonic diseases were to be found in various jurisdictions: homotoxic (toxins), homogenic (physical and emotional traumas), pathogenic, iatrogenic and ideogenic (spiritual diseases engendered by false belief, which he termed the "highest diseases" - as compared to the ‘deepest’ pathic diseases). The pathic diseases are found in reversible layers (‘layers prescribing’).

Because the pathic diseases generally arise out of the more primary constant (tonic) diseases, such as the chronic diseases that arise out of the chronic miasms, Hahnemann also laid down the principle that the tonic diseases should be treated first, and second any remaining pathic diseases.

In order to treat successfully the other cases of disease occurring in man, and which, be they acute or chronic, differ so vastly among each other [pathic], if they cannot be referred to some primary disease which is constant in its character [tonic], they must each be regarded as peculiar diseases, and a medicine which in its pure effects on the healthy body shows symptoms similar to those of the case before us, must be administered. (Lesser Writings, p. 693)

While the curative medicines for the tonic diseases could be largely determined by the principle linking disease and medicinal agent for the relevant jurisdiction, pathic disease treatment required a corresponding image of derangement of the Lebenskraft or Leib (executive organ of the Kraftwesen) so that this could be matched to the image presented by the patient. The problem lay in that a patient could present with more than one disease, each with a particular grouping of symptoms, but how could the practitioner link which symptoms manifest disorder(s) and of those ascribable to disease, and to which disease of the several possible at a given time in the patient, and finally, how could one trace any symptoms so identified to their origins? Here Hahnemann's genius adduced a living experience (Erlebnis) of the essence of a natural substance (Naturwesen) by way of a human prover, and in doing so, also provided the very practical scientific basis for removing the barrier set up by Kantian intellect between observer and observed, by invoking the cognitive capacity of Goethe's Gemüt (Aphorism 253 of the Organon der Heilkunst). Goethe himself, later in his life, recognized that Hahnemann had found a way to apply to and through human nature what he was doing with Mother Nature.

In the light of difficulties treating more complex cases, Hahnemann undertook further research and developed a theory of chronic miasms, which are fixed nature diseases of the pathogenic type (originally infectious, but also inherited) which give rise to all the (secondary) chronic diseases, which are pathic in nature (cf. Röschlaub's Pathogenesis). Hahnemann also gave indications as to when the practitioner could tell that the disease had been cured by the similar medicine and healing was underway (the complete process termed "heilen" or remediation). Constantine Hering, often called the Father of Homeopathy in the US, further developed these guidelines, which are often referred to as "Hering's Law or Principles" :

- from less vital to more vital organs
- in the case of pain, from above down
- in the same direction as the natural disease process.

This was later expanded in the latter half of the 19th century by Dr. James Tyler Kent who noticed that when disease was suppressed or several groups of symptoms (diseases) developed in a patient over time, that the remedial process proceeded in the reverse order of their emergence. This provides the basis for a sequential treatment of diseases. If some symptoms become worse some time after the similar medicine or there is even a return of old symptoms, essentially in chronic, complex cases, this Hahnemann identified as part of the healing process, which involves the counteraction of the sustentive power of the Kraftwesen against the medicine (similar ‘disease’).[Aph. 63-64]

While medicine had historically recognized, even into Hahnemann's time, the law of similars (similia similibus), it was also wary of its use because of risk of harm with the improper dose, and had largely abandoned it in favor of the other approach set out by Hippocrates involving the law of opposites, that is, acting to support the physis or sustentive power. Dr. Hahnemann discovered a way to attenuate the dose so that it could be rendered harmless but remain therapeutically active, what is often referred to as ‘dynamization’. Later he also discovered a way in which to sublimate, or the increase in dynamic power, of medicines (cf. Brown's sthenic enhancement).

These two laws divide therapeutics into two distinct approaches: medicine, which applies the law of similars, and physics (or the physical approach), which applies the law of opposites. These concepts correspond to the roles of the physician and the medician, representing the law of opposites and the law of similars, respectively.

=== Compeers, not rivals ===
Dr. Brown provided the essential elements for a new, functional (actions of powers, forces and energies) approach to understanding life and health, which insights were elaborated by Drs. Röschlaub and Hahnemann. Through their work, a fundamental set of dynamic polarities emerged with which to understand the essential polaric nature of life itself:

- sustentive and generative sides of the living power
- disturbances that lead first to disorders which can render one susceptible to contracting disease
- physical and medical interventions – physician and medician
- regimen and remedial agents for physic
- tonic and pathic diseases/chronic miasms and chronic diseases
- Erfahrung/Erlebnis
- Healing and curing
- Disease process: direct action of disease wesen and counteraction of human wesen
- Remedial process: curative action and healing reaction

At the same time, Goethe's scientific work on the underlying living functions in nature and Dr. Saumarez's new physiology of functions provided the necessary basis for understanding health and life. Underneath it all lay the elements of the Brunonian system, with its dynamic interplay of impression and response, positive or negative in terms of health (physiology) and divergences therefrom (pathology).

=== Goethe and Hahnemann ===
Goethe's approach to Mother Nature provided the theoretical foundation for and found a practical application in human nature in the works of Samuel Hahnemann. Goethe was aware of Hahnemann and his new approach to disease, and was treated using Hahnemann's system of medicine, Heilkunst. On one occasion Goethe wrote:

...Dr. Samuel Hahnemann...certainly a world-famous physician...I believe more than ever in this wonderful doctor’s theory as I have experienced...and continue to experience so clearly the efficacy of a very small administration.” And in another letter he strongly proclaimed himself a “Hahnemannian disciple”...

In his famous play, Faust, Goethe has the lead character, Mephistopheles, assert the homeopathic principle of similars: “To like things like, whatever one may ail; there’s certain help.”

In his later life and in his writing and diaries, Goethe writes in Faust: ‘Similia Similibus applies to all disorders‘, identifying the central theme of homeopathy and elaborating his sympathy and understanding of homeopathy, as illustrated in Wilhelm Meister’s Apprenticeship and his Tower Society which ‘adopts the homeopathic approach to its own psychological methods by using the irrational beliefs of its patients to cure them‘, portraying the ‘mistaken ideas as illness’, and using sickness to combat sickness. [also Werthe]

Goethe wrote several letters in 1820 mentioning and supporting ‘Hahnemann’s method’, ‘Hahnemann’s terminology’, and declaring his ‘confession of faith of a Hahnemannian disciple’, and indicating that he had read his works and looked forward to reflecting on ‘the wonder physician’.

Goethe was also aware of and followed Hahnemann's dietary rules. In 1826, he wrote to the Grand Duke Karl August that his diet was ‘almost Hahnemannian in its strictness’.

Hahnemann grasped and worked directly with Goethe's key contribution to Romantic epistemology, the Gemüt, or emotional mind and resonance organ, as well as its polarity to the Geist or spiritual mind, the directive organ: Geistes oder Gemüths Zustandes des Kranken; Geistes- oder Gemüths-Krankheiten; gemüthlicher und geistiger Charakter; Gemüthsart; Gemüths- und Denkungs- Art; Geistes- und Gemüths-Organe, Gemüths-Verstimmung.

Hahnemann undertook in the human realm what Goethe had explored in the plant realm with his morphology, that 'adventure of reason' Kant had stated was not possible, and observed first hand, through a living experience (Erlebnis) the impact of a natural Wesen (dynamic, living essential power) on a human Wesen (initially himself, and later other volunteers), producing a systematic image of the disturbance it produced in terms of pathology (alterations in feelings, functions and sensations) and semiology (outwardly perceptible signs), both over time in the one person, and then over time in a number of people giving an image (Bild) of the disturbance through its various expressions and manifestations, a Goethean approach. Indeed, the entire series and progression of provings or living experiences of medicinal substances by overtly healthy people constitutes an example of what Goethe was promoting as true scientific research:

The only way for a scientist to establish connections between seemingly isolated Erfahrungen or phenomena is through the "Vermannigfaltigung eines jeden einzelnen Versuches." [cf. Hahnemann's Materia Medica derived from a plurality of provers for each medicament and the plurality of provings comprising the whole] The scientist must work "indefatigably" through the manifold permutations and forms of a particular experiment (Naturlehre 35). The scientist must first conduct a series [Reihe] of experiments and, second, serialize them, i.e. consider them as one continuous and complete series of experiments. Studied in this manner—a method that I laid out above as the first step in the practice of morphology—these serialized experiments can represent "einen Versuch, nur eine Erfahrung" (Naturlehre 34) [cf. Hahnemnn's Arzneiversuche]. The serialization and subsequent reflection [meditation] on singular experiments and Erfahrungen, writes Goethe, produces an "Erfahrung [Phenomenon] von einer höhern Art."

In his approach to disease diagnoses and treatment, Hahnemann avoided what Goethe considered the ‘greatest failure’ (Unheil) and fault of material science, namely the separation of experimenter from nature, producing abstract hypotheses (notions) and artificial (künstlich) approaches/treatments based on an accumulation of disparate facts, rather than seeing nature as a complex web of associations, and understanding, as did Hahnemann and Goethe that "scientific knowledge emerges out of relationships and historical contexts."

Hahemann also sought to understand disease in its historical progression, as in the case of his Wesensgeschichte of Psora, the archetype (tonic) of inherited chronic disease, as well as its pleomorphic unfolding via numerous (gradated) levels of secondary (pathic) diseases, which then required a sequential (scalar) approach to treatment. Goethe's morphological insights provide the theoretical basis for Hahnemann's empirical discoveries and living experiments ('provings' or Erlbenisse). In these provings, Hahnemann sought to contemplate the movement, the flow and transformation of a disease state (Gestalt), not just an abstract image. Hahnemann also had a Goethean understanding of the sequential nature or unfolding of a disease phenomenon.

In Hahnemann's distinction between the two sides of the Lebenskraft – the sustentive or Erhaltungskraft and the generative or Erzeugungskraft (Bildungstrieb), we find the polar logic identified in Goethe's Chromatology – ‘the sufferings and deeds of light’ via a turbid medium, in the struggle between light energy (Licht) and the now identified 'dark' energy (Finsternis). We also find this polarity, as well as Goethe's distinction between the spectrum of dark and of light, in the distinction Hahnemann made between primary or tonic disease (based on a super-sensible knowing of psychic states involving alterations in circumstances, occurrents and behaviors via the Goethean Gemüt or super-sensible cognitive organ) and secondary or pathic disease (based on the sensible manifestation of life energy at the somatic level in terms of feelings, functions and sensations, as well as signs). For Goethe the turbid medium is the atmosphere (airy realm), for Hahnemann it is the living organism (fluid or etheric realm). Goethe's interplay of Licht and Finsternis can also be seen in Hahnemann's polarity between Geist (Spirit) and Wesen (Dynamis).

The objections that Goethe leveled against the taxonomy of Linnaeus in botany can be found in the medical sphere in Hahnemann's criticism of the blindly empirical or abstractly intellectual nosology of his time that took a few outer elements, arbitrarily conflated them, then confounded similarity of appearance here with identity of cause and origin. Hahnemann's criticism also was based on an historical study of the morphology of this medical state of mind or Kurwesen, much as Goethe considered the study of history of a phenomenon as a form of knowledge (as did the Greeks). Equally, Hahnemann was critical of a static approach to disease nosology, which was constantly shape-shifting as the interaction between Krankheitwesen and Menschenwesen expressed different aspects of the same underlying disease (these being considered different diseases in the static Linnean nosology of materialistic medicine). Hahnemann also understood that there was an element of fixity and variability to disease (found in his distinction (1796) between primary (tonic) and secondary (pathic) diseases, just as Goethe accepted a degree of form and structure at the physical level whilst pointing to the underlying dynamics leading to new forms over time (Darwin's adaptation).

=== Lutze and Schönlein ===
The works of Hahnemann and Röschlaub were continued and furthered by Drs. Arthur Lutze and Johan Schönlein (1793–1864) respectively. Lutze (1813–1870) took the foundations of Hahnemann's approach to disease and placed it on a solid romantic footing in consciously and consistently applying dual remedy prescribing (tonic and pathic disease associations in a given patient).

Where Hahnemann had hesitated and eventually withdrew his public support in the 5th edition of his Organon der Heilkunst for dual remedy prescribing, having been unable yet to establish a principle upon which to ground it rationally (what is known as the ‘dual remedy affair’), Lutze later re-issued the 5th edition with the withdrawn dual remedy section and clinically practiced based on such an approach. His contribution is recognized in the monument to both Hahnemann and Lutze in Köthen, Germany.

Röschlaub's innovative work in establishing a teaching clinic based on the Brunonian system, in conjunction with Dr. Albert Marcus, was developed further by J. L. Schönlein (1793–1864), who is recognized explicitly even in allopathic historiography for having established the scientific foundation for the modern teaching and practice clinic. This foundation is one based on natural science, but also on the arte (Pascal's spirit of finesse) of the practitioner, which is something objective and reproducible though based on a different logic and involving more fugitive causes (allopathic ‘medicine’ accepting only the first and then only natural inertial science, not a true physiology of functions, both physical and etheric)

== The schism ==
Up until the middle of the 19th century, following the pioneering work of Brown, Hahnemann, Röschlaub, Lutze and Schönlein, to mention only the main figures, the scientific approach to the question of life, particularly as reflected in the development of Healthcare, seemed conducive to the development of a method that was based on a cognitive capacity going beyond mere mentation (Sinn or mens) and a true physiology involving living functions rather than simply mechanics and chemistry. However, it seemed that the Zeitgeist (Spirit of the Times) could not yet accept such an approach, most minds being still fully ensconced in the intellectual phase (Coleridge's "epoch of the intellect and the senses") of human consciousness. It was only the extraordinary mind of genius that was able at this stage to meet the challenge of a true science of life and mind, what Colerdige termed the “Dynamic System of Thought.”

As a result, the analytical approach favored by the French, schooled in the Cartesian system of mind-body duality, and with their significant advances in surgery (albeit based on access to and development of original Greek medical writings and more modern Greek surgical practice), came to dominate Western science. In Germany, the work of Rudolf Virchow, while drawing from the advances made by Romantic science, effectively reduced and simplified them more in line with what the intellect was able to grasp. The achievements of Romantic Science and Medicine could not be denied, but neither could they be accepted; instead, the followers of the Romantic tradition were either denigrated as considered misguided, occult, and ultimately dreamers rather than serious scientists. The following historiographic assessment is the one that has generally prevailed until recently.

Around the middle of the 1800s, medicine makes a gigantic surge into a critical, empirical-analytical research project: Virchow's demand for a strict, natural [inertial] scientific method then enabled medical thinking to disentangle itself from the flowery and thorny fields of romantic Naturphilosophie and to transplant itself into the earth of natural scientific-analytic procedure. (Schrenk 1973)

Virchow's cellular theory provided the supposed basis for life, without explaining it, and superseded the ancient, and by now denigrated humoral theory (because the noetic capacity to diagnose at this etheric level had waned). As such, chemistry and physics could become the basis for medicine, all the more in that medicine effectively had been reduced to surgery and chemistry, the latter due to Pasteur's ‘germ theory’ of disease (really an unproven hypothesis and where proven according to strict requirements of Koch's postulates, still not fully explanatory in terms of the concepts and reality of ‘susceptibility’ and ‘immunity’, which contemporaries of Pasteur, such as Béchamp and Claude Bernard, sought to address).

The problem of life was to be ‘solved’ by Virchow's cellular hypothesis as the basis of life, which conveniently posited life within medicine without having to explain it. Thus, as N. Tsouyopoulos points out, Western ‘medicine’ was effectively reduced to surgery and emergency drug treatments, possessing no basis to deal with chronic, complex disorders or diseases having rejected the dynamic approaches developed by the Brunonian orientation, as developed in general terms (physic and physiology) by Röschlaub/Schönlein and Saumarez, and in particular regarding disease (medicine and pathology) by Hahnemann/Lutze. As one reviewer of Tsouyopoulos' major work on romantic medicine summarized: "Romantic medicine was to fall into disfavour as the positivist approach from France gained ground, to the point where Karl August Wunderlich in 1859 dismissed it as mere hollow theory divorced from all empiricism, a myth that survived for nearly a century."

To the extent that human physiology contains a physical/chemical aspect (broken bones, impinging tumours on vital nerves, severed arteries, or severe tissue damage, significant hormonal or chemical imbalances, severe microbial invasion, and the like), a mechanic-material approach will produce effective results, witness the ‘miracles’ of Western emergency medicine, but in the realm of internal ‘medicine’, there are no cures, only the suppression of symptoms or long-term disease and disorder management using chemical means, mostly synthetic, the intellect seeing no difference between a natural ‘chemical’ and a synthesized one. As one writer summarizes: "Alongside of English and French medicine of that time, whose significance was never under-appreciated, German Romantic Medicine comes off in no way as inferior or reactionary. Its contribution to overcoming the foundational crisis in medical history and for founding a scientific clinic is substantial and decisive for the whole of later developments...today, in our searching for new models and alternatives in medicine, Romantic Medicine lies closer to home than the so-called natural scientific medicine of the later 1800s and early 1900s."

== Contemporary use ==
In 2017, Kamiar-K. Rueckert introduced the term "Romantic Patient" in reference to Romantic medicine and romantic relationships to describe a patient group, which uses the defence mechanism of splitting to divide medicine into good spiritual alternative medicine and bad scientific-based medicine. In his view, these patients are on the one hand aware of their longing for an intuitively understood healing relationship, while on the other hand deny their underlying reason for this longing.

== See also ==
- Romantic psychology
- Romantic science
