= Organic form =

In romantic literature, a work has organic form if the structure has originated from the materials and subjects used by the author. Using the organic metaphor, the structure is seen to grow as a plant. It stands in contrast to a mechanical form, a work which has been produced in accordance with artificial rules. The lack of rules in Shakespeare's works led some critics to claim that they lacked form; Samuel Taylor Coleridge leapt to his defence with the concept of organic form.

== Overview ==
Coleridge, an English poet, philosopher, literary critic, and founder of the Romantic movement, suggested that the concept of organic form meant that a poem or literary piece was shaped, rather than structured, from within. The use of the form allowed a piece to uniquely develop itself as it unfolded, and ultimately revealed an emphasis on the whole outcome of the piece, including the connections of each development to each other. In contrast to the more mechanical processes and rules which many critics believed were necessary for the formation of poetry and works, S.T. Coleridge determined that a more subconscious approach was possible through the "imagination of the artist", whereby the outcome is an organic form where "content and form have coalesced and fused."

Coleridge's explanation can be found in Vol. 2 of Twentieth Century Literature in English:

The form is mechanic when on any given material we impress a predetermined form, not necessarily arising out of the properties of the material—as when to a mass of wet clay we give whatever shape we wish it to retain when hardened. The organic form, on the other hand, is innate; it shapes as it develops itself from within, and the fullness of its development is one and the same with the perfection of its outward form.

In R.A. Foake's introduction to Coleridge's Criticism of Shakespeare: A Selection, he defines Coleridge's defense of Shakespeare's works as "an act of sympathetic imagination, to enter into the spirit of each work, to reveal its inner organizing principle, and to show how Shakespeare, properly understood, was always in control and exercising judgement."

Regarding Shakespeare's much criticized erratic form, Coleridge further imposed the possibilities of organic form:

...each exterior is the physiognomy of the being within, its true image reflected and thrown out from the concave mirror; and even such is the appropriate excellence of her chosen poet, our own Shakespeare—himself a nature humanized, a genial understanding directing self-consciously a power and implicit wisdom deeper than consciousness.

Following on from Coleridge's 18th-century ideas on organic form, was Gerard Manley Hopkins, one of the most revered poets of the Victorian era. Hopkins introduced the terms "inscape" and "instress". "Inscape" was the core components in individual objects, allowing him to then home in on its relation to other objects and their perception as a whole. "Instress" focussed on the assimilating the immediate apperception and the sensory processes of perception.

20th-century American poet Denise Levertov was an artist of organic form. In Some notes on organic form she gives credit to Gerard Manley Hopkins' influence on her own ideas and poetic form:

A partial definition, then, of organic poetry might be that it is a method of apperception, i.e., of recognizing what we perceive, and is based on an intuition of an order, a form beyond forms, in which forms partake, and of which man's creative works are analogies, resemblances, natural allegories. Such poetry is exploratory.

Levertov believed that in order to achieve organic form in literature, the artist must be 'brought to speech' through a demanding sensory experience which renders them no choice but to put pen to paper. In her own work, Levertov concentrated on various techniques such as enjambment, popular with much of Shakespeare's work, and 'juxtaposition of key words' for effect. Avenues were carefully sought and deliberated upon to create the 'right words, the right image, the right arrangement of the lines on the page'. Many artists of organic form believed that a reader or audience were not immediately, if ever, considered during the construction of a poem or piece. Levertov, included, felt it was essential that a poem be produced from the 'inner being of the poet'.

Organic form in literature was also theorized by Schelling. Bruce Matthews suggests that, insofar as Schelling understands life according to a schema of freedom of thinking, representations are not absolutely different, and subjects and objects are grounded in an identity that links them together. Matthews argues that Schelling's organic philosophy strives to support an integrated framework where conceptual ideas are scrutinized, challenging ideas and concepts in hopes to create a more significant understanding of the world.

== See also ==
- Romantic epistemology
