= Arthur Lutze =

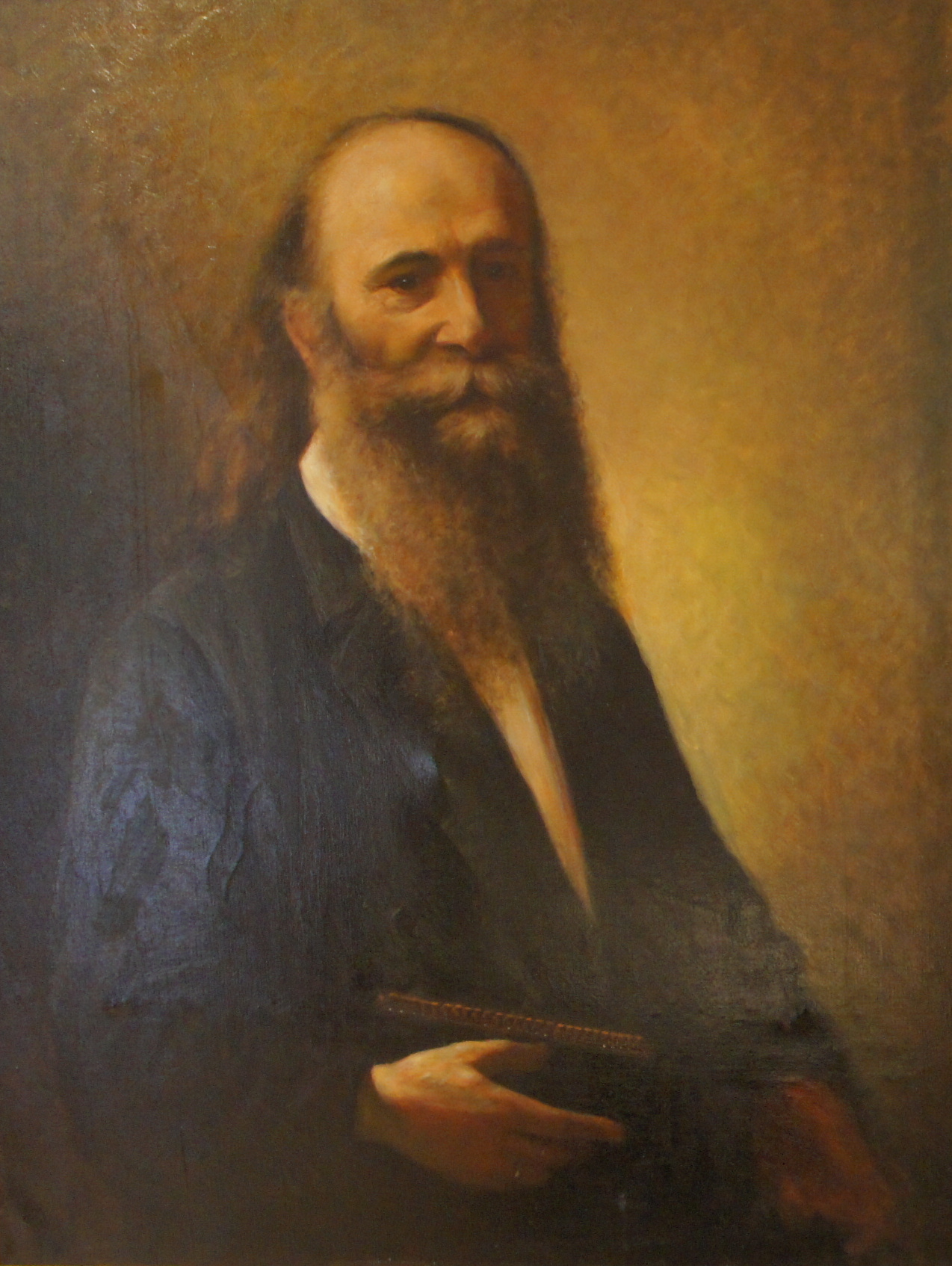
Arthur Lutze 1860.

Arthur Lutze (June 1, 1813 – April 11, 1870), was a major figure in medicine and regimen in Germany because of his establishment of a major homeopathic clinic and spa in Köthen, Germany in the mid-1800s. He was also known for his advancement of a particular approach in the use of homeopathic medicines, known as dual remedy prescribing, after it was ostensibly dropped (though only publicly, not in private practice) by others, including Samuel Hahnemann, the founder of the homeopathic approach. His decision in 1865 to release a version of the much awaited, but long delayed publication of the last, 6th edition of Hahnemann's Organon der Heilkunst, which included a disputed paragraph created by Hahnemann for the 5th edition, but subsequently withdrawn for political reasons within the homeopathic medical community in Germany, resulted in a strong protest from more conventional homeopaths.

== Early life ==
Born in Unter den Linden, he was raised on the family estate at Arthursberg near Stettin. Losing both parents early in his life, he then started work as a postal clerk in 1830. It was during this time that he became interested in homeopathy and decided after many years of private study to dedicate himself to this profession, and left the postal service in 1843. Lutze gave an impassioned eulogy in Mühlhausen on the occasion of the death of Samuel Hahnemann, the founder of homeopathy, that very same year.

He started practicing homeopathic medicine in Potsdam, treating thousands of patients, mostly free of charge. In 1845 he moved to Köthen, where Hahnemann had earlier practiced, before moving to Paris in his final years, and became quite successful in healing, even attracting comments about being a "miracle healer". The famous portrait artist for Goethe, William of Kügelgen, commented on his appearance "a short, stocky figure with a large yet beautiful and intelligent head … and a tremendous prophet's beard" ["eine kurze gedrungene Gestalt mit einem großen aber schönen und intelligenten Kopf … und ein ungeheurer Prophetenbart … (aus: Jugenderinnerungen, Berlin 1870).]

Lutze studied medicine more formally and received his doctorate in 1848 in Jena, based on a dissertation concerning cataract surgery, De cataractae extractione. In 1854 he decided to construct a homeopathic clinic, the largest ever at the time in the world, raising the money personally in such a short time that it was able to open its doors in 1855. The clinic, built in Renaissance style, is still standing. It contained several large wards and 72 private rooms for well-to-do patients, a park, various spas, library, art gallery and observatory. The poor were treated, as was Lutze's custom, for free. By 1864, some 26,690 patients had been handled, and the hospital received over 162,000 inquiries from around the world. The clinic remained in operation until 1914. It was recently restored.

Part of Lutze's approach also involved dietary and regimenal aspects and he published a popular pamphlet called Lebensregeln der neuen, naturgemäßen Heilkunde (which went through 64 printings). Many of his ideas reflected ideas that Hahnemann had also developed early in his career, such as he published in Friend of Health in 1791. In his often innovative combining of regimen and medicine, his clinic was one of the first "wellness" clinics in the West.

However, it is the use of homeopathic approach to medicine that was the most dominant in his clinic and which also became the most controversial, not so much from non-homeopathic medical circles, but from within the homeopathic ranks themselves. The success of his methods are on record, and his clinic was a widely recognized success, but he aroused opposition from contemporary homeopathic doctors. The main reason for the controversy had less to do with his success, and more to do with Lutze's development of an approach to prescribing that had been developed by Hahnemann and a few others, but which met fierce opposition initially when it was revealed, in the 1830s. Lutze's revival of the method of using two remedies at a time and also his restoration of a deleted section from the 5th edition of Hahnemann's Organon der Heilkunst on the method, created what is known as the "Dual Remedy Affair".

== The Dual Remedy Affair ==
=== Background ===
To understand the important role played by Lutze in homeopathy, it is important to understand the background of his decision to use a dual remedy approach in prescribing, seemingly counter to the principle laid down by Hahnemann regarding 'one remedy at a time'. In the Spring of 1833, Samuel Hahnemann received a letter (dated 15 May) from a Dr. Karl Julius Aegidi (1795–1874), one of his closest followers, setting out the positive clinical results (233 cured cases) using a new approach to the use of remedies, using two remedies at the same time, which was seemingly contrary to the advice Hahnemann had been giving in the past 4 editions of his Organon der Heilkunst, the main work on homeopathic medicine. Hahnemann replied on 15 June 1833 and stated that he was "delighted that such a happy idea has occurred to you" and based on the proviso that each remedy must be "homeopathically suitable, but each from a different side", Hahnemann further stated that "the procedure is so consonant with the requirements of our art that nothing can be urged against it". (Haehl, Vol II, p. 85).

Here Hahnemann was referring to basic principles that he had laid down in his foundational work, On A New Principle for Ascertaining the Curative Power of Drugs, 1796 concerning two 'sides' of disease, namely those of a fixed nature and those of a variable nature. Further, Hahnemann also had identified two sides to the life force (Lebenskraft) and two phases to the disease process: the initial (Erstwirkung) action of the disease agent impinging on the generative side (Lebens-Erzeugungskraft) of the life force, and the counter or after action (Gegenwirkung or Nachwirkung) of the sustentive side (Lebens-Erhaltungskraft) of that same life force (see Romantic Medicine: Details of Heilkunst). Thus, the concept of 'at a time' (auf einmal) meant for Hahnemann that one could not give a second remedy normally within the initial action of the first remedy. With crude doses, this initial action could be hours or minutes, but with higher potencies Hahnemann had discovered that the initial action was very short and almost instantaneous and thus could accept Aegidi's approach to the extent it also used remedies 'in smallest dose or by olfaction'. (Haehl, Vol. II, p. 85) Later, when Hahnemann continued use of the dual remedy approach, he decided to be more cautious and used one remedy in the morning and another in the afternoon as related in his case books from the last years of his life in Paris.

Hahnemann also mentioned that von Bönninghausen (or Boenninghausen as he was Dutch), another very close follower, "is entirely of our opinion and acts accordingly". Indeed, Hahnemann went so far in his enthusiasm and praise, that he offered to present this discovery by adding a special section in the about to be published 5th edition of the Organon. In 15 June letter, Hahnemann also notes that Jahr, editor of the homeopathic medical journal, Archiv, in which Aegidi would also publish about the dual remedy approach, was in on the matter. (Haehl, Vol. II, p. 85) Two days later Hahnemann wrote to von Boenninghausen confirming that he had started to use the dual remedy approach and would add something on it to the 5th Edition. (Haehl, Vol. II, p. 253) Hahnemann had already been made aware of the use of dual remedies and wrote to Aegidi on 28 April 1833, to be cautious in their use. (Haehl, Vol I, p. 393) Further, in the paragraph Hahnemann wrote for the 5th Edition and had already sent to the printer, he notes that the use of dual remedies is similar in concept to his previous use of two remedies in quick alternation. (O.A. Julian1984, p. 42 quoted in an article by De Ruyter, Dr. Eddy, Homeopathic Drainage Treatment According to Vannier, Homeopathy Online, Vol. 6) Another homeopathic historian writes "Another extremely interesting feature of Hahnemann's practice at this time is his use of two remedies at once."

Boenninghausen later wrote of the origin of the idea, a certain Dr. Stoll in Cologne around 1832–33, who thought that "two kinds of medicine should be combined in a prescription in order to supplement each other.".

However, around this time, Hahnemann was engaged in a dispute, often acrimonious, with most of the homeopaths in Leipzig, over the mixing of homeopathic and allopathic methods ("venesection, leeches, emetics, laxatives, etc."). Hahnemann was concerned to fight any kind of co-option by the prevailing medical system. Indeed, one of his major opponents in German medicine more generally was Hufeland, a very influential figure at the time.

Another point of dispute was his publication regarding the nature and origin of chronic diseases, which was seen by many as misguided and unfounded, though they praised the actual remedies for treatment. (Haehl, Vol II, p. 163) Hahnemann and the Leipzig homeopaths had agreed to meet on 10 August 1833 to try to resolve their differences. At this "peace" conference, Hahnemann decided, in light of its success, to raise Aegidi's proposal for dual remedy prescribing, but as the British Journal of Homoeopathy of July 1865 explains, "Hahnemann was persuaded that this would probably lead to the polypharmacy of the old school, and he decided to exclude this doctrine from the new edition of the 'Organon'". However, the matter itself was not seen as contravening any homeopathic principle laid down by Hahnemann, as it was not mentioned at all in the "peace agreement" of 11 August 1833. (Haehl, Vol. I, p. 200) On 19 August, Hahnemann wrote to Aegidi and repeated his approval of the use of dual remedies and confirmed that he had indeed written a new paragraph for insertion in the 5th edition as "my only wish is that the world should gain the best, the most useful truth." (Haehl, Vol. II, p. 85)

However, scarcely a month later, concerns about the misunderstandings that his new paragraph might cause, as pressed on him by 10 August meeting with the Leipzig homeopaths, led him to decide to withdraw the disputed paragraph (as stated in a letter of 15 September 1833 to von Boenninghausen). He was mainly concerned that his main opponent, Hufeland, would use it against him, to discredit homeopathy. (Haehl, Vol. II, p. 253) While Hahnemann, in his correspondence with von Boenninghausen, still accepted "the possibility that two well-chosen remedies may be given together with advantage in some cases" he felt he had not had enough experience himself to yet endorse it publicly, particularly given its controversial nature. (Haehl, Vol. II, p. 253-4)

Thus, instead of the new paragraph, Hahnemann withdrew it and altered the existing aphorism 272 of the 4th edition by adding a footnote to it. Far from being a condemnation of the double remedy approach, Hahnemann here repeats essentially what he had written to Boenninghausen. While for many, this was the end of the affair, the case book evidence shows that Hahnemann continued to experiment with dual remedies, though in a slightly different form. In writing to Aegidi on 9 January 1834, Hahnemann was at pains to ensure that only those who really understood the new insights continue the use of dual remedies in mixture, and then not in the full public glare. (Haehl, Vol. I, p. 393-4)

It should not be surprising then that Lutze, when he heard of the use of dual remedies from Aegidi, and then knowing that this had been supported, publicly at first, then privately, by Hahnemann himself, as well as Boenninghausen, and learning of its efficacy, decided to apply the method as well in his large clinic. When his results were as successful as the others, the silence on this matter and the delay in the releasing of the final, 6th edition of Hahnemann's Organon, caused him to decide finally to make public the deleted portions regarding dual remedy prescribing in 1865.
