= Romantic epistemology =

Theory of knowledge

Romantic epistemology emerged from the Romantic challenge to both the static, materialist views of the Enlightenment (Hobbes) and the contrary idealist stream when it came to studying life. Romanticism needed to develop a new theory of knowledge that went beyond the method of inertial science, derived from the study of inert nature (natura naturata), to encompass vital nature (natura naturans). Samuel Taylor Coleridge was at the core of the development of the new approach, both in terms of art and the 'science of knowledge' itself (epistemology). Coleridge's ideas regarding the philosophy of science involved Romantic science in general, but Romantic medicine in particular, as it was essentially a philosophy of the science(s) of life.

What is Life? Were such a question proposed, we should be tempted to answer, what is not Life that really is?

== Background ==
European thought had come through the scientific revolution concerning heaven (astronomy) and earth (physics), and emerged, full of optimism about man's power of cognition, into the Age of Reason or Enlightenment. In facing the mystery of life itself, researchers first sought to apply the method that had worked so effectively for inertial nature to the realm of vital nature. In this approach Man himself was seen as a static entity and a tabula rasa, onto which was written sense-experience, considered as the source of all knowledge. Thus, life and knowledge were increasingly regarded from a mechanical and materialistic perspective. As William Godwin stated succinctly about the age, "the human mind… is nothing but a faculty of perception," that all knowledge "comes from impression," and the mind starts with "absolute ignorance." (Enquiry Concerning Political Justice, 1793)

However, this approach faced a problem: the experience of a split between subject (man as experiencing) and object (the thing being experienced), the inner world of the mind and the outer world of things. This very real experience created a growing unease and doubt in Western philosophy regarding the reliability of sense-experience as the basis for knowledge: did what was perceived bear any true relationship to what was or was perception simply at best a representation of reality and at worst an illusion. The epistemological dilemma arising from man's existential reality eventuated in two positions - materialism and idealism. The materialism of Hobbes elevated matter, and the sense-experience of matter, to the level of sole reality, life being but an epiphenomenon. The contrary position of Hume was that the only reality man could be certain of was his inner experience of thought so that reality was not object-ive (things outside of us), but a creation of the mind. The materialist position was combatted initially by the works of the Cambridge Platonists, notably More and Cudworth, who set out to show how Nature, Man and the Divine were connected through a 'plastic power' that was accessible to the mind if it were approached rightly.

Cudworth had challenged the rising tide of empiricism in his day by asserting that the universe was not (as Hobbes and others believed) composed merely of inert material atoms governed by mechanical laws; rather, the natural world was symbolic of a transcendent reality that lay beyond material appearances.

The idealist position was challenged by the Common Sense Philosophy of Thomas Reid. The German philosopher, Immanuel Kant, whose ancestors came from the same part of Scotland as Reid, set out to rescue scientific knowledge from the idealism of Hume. While his critical analysis set the foundation for a more rigorous philosophy and science, his solution to idealism was to accept Hume's limits to human knowledge as well as the idea of a transcendent reality, but then to assert the legitimacy of natural science in delineating the reality of sense-experience, and to operate 'as if' what one perceived was indeed reality, an approach that served to 'save the appearances'.

== Central role of Samuel Taylor Coleridge ==
Romanticism was inspired by Kant's critical approach to the problem of knowledge, but rejected his limits to that knowledge, seeing it as confining the science of vital nature to the materialist approach, making life an epiphenomenon of "the chance whirlings of unproductive particles" as Coleridge put it succinctly. There was a profound feeling that a new epistemology, or 'science of knowledge' was needed to deal with the question of vital nature and the nature of life itself. Art, and in particular poetry, provided a vehicle to explore vital nature and to get to its essence, but for it to be scientific required an epistemological foundation. The central figure in the development of this epistemology was Samuel Taylor Coleridge (along with J.W. von Goethe in Germany); this was recognized in his time, after his time and even most recently.

Certainly he stood athwart his age in many respects…and not least his seminal presence in the more ordered oeuvres of his friends and critics…continues to grow.

...he was so seminal a thinker that his insights and apercus tend to "sprout in the brains" with a fertility that is positively dangerous.

The influence of Coleridge, like that of Bentham, extends far beyond those who share in the peculiarities of his religious or philosophical creed. He has been the great awakener in this country of the spirit of philosophy, within the bounds of traditional opinions. He has been, almost as truly as Bentham, 'the great questioner of things established'; for a questioner needs not necessarily be an enemy. (John Stuart Mill, in Coleridge, 1840)

Coleridge was strongly influenced in his initial study of philosophy by Kant, but also from the re-introduction of Platonic thought via the Cambridge Platonists, particularly the discovery of Cudworth's history of thought [Hill, Introduction], and the ideas of Plotinus and neo-Platonism, not to mention the common sense philosophy of Thomas Reid. The view of the mind as passive was challenged, as it seemed to leave no room for creativity and individuality. His own experience of creative powers of the mind, as experienced in and through poetry in particular, led him to seek out the role of imagination in human thought, and necessarily to distinguish it from fancy.

== Role of imagination ==
The meeting with Wordsworth in 1795 marked a turning point in Coleridge's thinking about thinking. In Wordsworth, Coleridge found a congenial mind, one that helped to foster the "innate platonising quality" of his mind. This collaboration led to an enhancement of his own poetic creativity and the growth of his critical faculty.

If Coleridge plunged impulsively into the Rubicon in 1795, it is equally clear that he emerged on the further shore in the late summer of 1802 and advanced directly on Rome with confidence and a firmly defined sense of mission.

Coleridge went to Germany with Wordsworth in 1798-99, learned German and became more acquainted with German philosophy, both the Kantian stream and German Idealism (Fichte, Schelling). Coleridge came to realize that the mind was not an associative faculty governed by blind, mechanical laws, as Hartley's doctrine of mechanical association presented it, but rather was essentially a product of a creative shaping power (imagination) that ruled perception and governed our mentation but could also in its higher form be used to create new "things", resulting in the evolution of consciousness and mind itself. Coleridge distinguished between imagination and fancy, which only fabricated illusions. For Coleridge, the creative capacity of the imagination, the "prime agent of all human perception," was the key to connecting to the essence of things outside of ourselves and overcoming the apparent split between self and object occasioned by man's self-consciousness. The driving force of that connection and the activation of the creative imagination to get at the inherent essence of external objects was love, a deep desire to know other than ourselves. As Dorothy Emmet (1952) noted, the entire basis of Coleridge's new approach to knowing nature was that "we should be able not only to look, but to love as we look" making philosophy and science a romantic endeavour.

== Relation of matter and sense-experience to reality ==
For Coleridge, Western philosophy was intellect-bound and driven, containing no power of creative imagination, such as could be discerned in the Greek term nous ("noetic capacity"), as expressed most maturely in neo-Platonic philosophy (Plotinus). Philosophy, for Coleridge, was scientia scientiarum (the science of science), and critical to any advance in knowledge was its ability to go beyond a mere compilation of facts to the use of the creative imagination to create a true epistemology, or the 'true and original realism.'

The final object and distinctive character of philosophy, is this: for all that exists conditionally (i.e. the existence of which is inconceivable except under the condition of its dependency on some other as its antecedent) to find a ground that is unconditional and absolute, and thereby to reduce the aggregate of human knowledge to a system. Philosophy itself becomes the supplement of the sciences, both as the convergence of all to the common end, namely, wisdom; and as supplying the copula, which modified in each science in the comprehension of its parts to one whole, is in its principles common to all the sciences, as integral parts of one system. And this is METHOD, itself a distinct science, the immediate offspring of philosophy, and the link or mordant by which philosophy becomes scientific and the sciences philosophical. The office of philosophical disquisition consists in just distinction; while it is the privilege of the philosopher to preserve himself constantly aware, that distinction is not division. In order to obtain adequate notions of any truth, we must intellectually separate its distinguishable parts; and this is the technical process of philosophy. But having so done, we must then restore them in our conceptions to the unity, in which they actually co-exist; and this is the result of philosophy.

This capacity for seeing in a new light required a new capacity, and just as 'all the organs of sense are framed for a corresponding world of sense' so 'all the organs of spirit are framed for a correspondent world of spirit' so that the first principle of a true philosophy is 'to render the mind intuitive of the spiritual in man' that is, that which lies on the other side of our natural awareness from sense-experience. And it is the sense-world that derives from a higher super-sensible world, not the converse as materialism would have it. "I teach a real existence of a spiritual world without a material, but no matter without Spirit.' This world beyond the confines of space and time involved an 'ethereal element' by means of which individual entities, at base non-material, could communicate via 'the tremulous reciprocations of which propagate themselves to the inmost of the soul'. And these tremulations operate on and between entities via one's deep desire (love-resonance) that creates a circuit between subject and object, such that one has access via an inner organ (Coleridge's "inmost mind" or Goethe's Gemüt) and the corresponding 'philosophic' or re-emergent Greek noetic organ. All knowledge for Coleridge rests on the "coadunation" of subject and object, of the representation in the mind (thought) of a sense experience with the object itself, which can only occur where there is a connection between subject and object ('a reciprocal concurrence of both') beyond pure sense-experience, such that the thought that arises out of 'the mind's self-experience in the act of thinking' produces not a representation but a phenomenon (in the Heideggerian sense) that is the re-enactment in the mind of reality (such as for Collingwood in his Idea of History) and as such is knowledge that is apodictic, heuristic and hermeneutic all at the same time.

== Dual basis for the epistemology of life ==
Coleridge based his epistemology on two facts of experience: that of self (I AM) and that of a world co-connected with self. Our being is something we can know intuitively and certainly, but the existence of things outside is less certain and subject to doubt, unless one acknowledges that a world outside is 'not only coherent but identical, and one and the same thing with our own immediate self-consciousness', that is, that the experience of things without is a function of our experience of self. If we use only the intellect, we separate things that are not in reality separated, and this then gives only a knowledge of the outer appearances (Bacon's natura naturata), termed in German, Wissen, known as natural science (Natur-Wissenschaft). Upon irradiation from the noetic (from Greek nous) ideational capacity, however, this natural science of inert nature then becomes a useful means to render rational and analytical (therefore public knowledge or science) what is otherwise experienced only internally as a private ('subjective') knowledge.

The presupposition of material science of an objective world 'out there' separate from us that causes sense-experience and is then responsible for our thoughts and feelings is replaced for Coleridge by 'the truest and most binding realism' that is grounded in a "coeducation" between subject and object, mediated by the creative imagination, a very real power of mind that reunites in 'the human mind above nature', what is always united, but only separate by a 'prejudice of our mind' due to our self-consciousness arising out of the self-awareness created by the mental capacity (Latin mens). Coleridge's “true and original realism” accepts that the object perceived is itself real and not an illusion of the mind, as Hume and Kant would have it, but also that 'an object is inconceivable without a subject as its antithesis. Omen perceptum percipientum supponit [Everything perceived supposes a perceiver].' At the same time, the underlying principle of this realism can be neither subject or object, but that which unites the two, and this is a self-consciousness presence of mind ('self-consciousness is not a kind of being, but a kind of knowing' - Biographia Literaria)

Thesis VI: This principle, and so characterised manifests itself in the SUM or I AM; which I shall hereafter indiscriminately express by the words spirit, self, and self-consciousness. In this, and in this alone, object and subject, being and knowing, are identical, each involving and supposing the other. In other words, it is a subject which becomes a subject by the act of constructing itself objectively to itself; but which never is an object except for itself, and only so far as by the very same act it becomes a subject.

Sense-experience for Coleridge does not cause mind but is a means of revealing and evolving mind. As a result, being and thinking are not related as cause to effect, but as co-determinant. “... the principium essendi does not stand to the principlum cognoscende in the relation of cause to effect, but both the one and the other are co-inherent and identical.” (Biographia Literaria) Self-conscious, being a self-contained principle, can then be made into a pure thought, containing a polarity, "with two opposite and counteracting forces," which is the minimum needed for motion (“life”), that then leads to self-discovery and "the fullness of the human intelligence." (Biographia Literaria)

If the intelligent faculty should be rendered more comprehensive, it would require only a different and apportioned organization–the body celestial instead of the body terrestrial–to bring before every human soul the collective experience of its whole past existence. (Biographia Literaria)

== Method ==
The means by which philosophy, or the general principles for seeking knowledge, is rendered into actual knowledge or science is “method.” Method involves the considered, thoughtful arrangement of parts that reflects the inner essence of things (association by continuity), and not simply their apparent association in space and time (association by contiguity). This involves a "preconception" a "leading Thought" - Bacon's 'forethoughtful inquiry' or 'dry light' (lumens siccum) - and a"progressive transition" not "a mere dead arrangement."

But as, without continuous transition, there can be no Method, so without a preconception there can be no transition with continuity. The term, Method cannot therefore, otherwise than by abuse, be applied to a mere dead arrangement, containing in itself no principle of progression.

Coleridge uses the example of electricity which had been known as an empirical fact for centuries, but it was not until science took on the organizing Idea of polarity (out of the genius of mind that derived this from the “given” of the world order), that rapid progress was made in revealing the nature and governing laws of this fact of nature. This is in contrast to magnetism, also known for centuries, but still 'unknown' scientifically in his day as being still without an organizing Idea.

The naturalist, who cannot or will not see, that one fact is often worth a thousand (the important consideration so often dwelt upon, so forcibly urged, so powerfully amplified and explained by our great countryman Bacon), as including them all in itself, and that it first makes all the others facts; who has not the head to comprehend, the soul to reverence, a central experiment or observation (what the Greeks would perhaps have called a protophenomenon)–; will never receive an auspicious answer from the oracle of nature.

The fact of a relationship of parts to wholes derives from man's inherent experience of himself as apart from nature and yet somehow connected with it, “the instinct, in which humanity itself is grounded: that by which, in every act of conscious perception, we at once identify our being with that of the world without us, and yet place ourselves in contradistinction to that world.”

The arrangement of parts must be into a consciously perceived real whole where the whole is in each of the parts (though some parts may contain more of the whole), and is not merely the sum of the parts (mechanism) or even greater or above the parts (mysticism). Arranging the parts into their governing whole involves two forms of ordering or relations: ordination, or the hierarchicial arrangement of discoveries using the 'leading Thought" such as in medicine, physics and chemistry, and "LAW", which is the correlative to the Platonic 'IDEA', In other words, Idea and Law are the Subjective and Objective Poles of the same Magnet i.e. of the same living and energizing Reason [Wisdom]. What is an Idea in the Subject, i.e. in the Mind, is a Law in the Object, i.e. in Nature. (from a letter by Coleridge of 23 June 1829)

Both determine the relation of the parts to the whole, and create the governing 'truth originating in the [noetic] mind, and not abstracted or generalized from observation of the parts." There is divine or spiritual LAW and Natural Law, and between these two lies the laws governing human culture or the arts, for every work of the genius of man contains 'a necessary predominance of the Ideas (i.e. of that which originates in the artist himself), and a comparative indifference of the materials'.

The goal of philosophy is to make systematic and conscious that which otherwise happens naturally, but unconsciously, namely access to the higher realm of Idea and Law (what Coleridge termed revelation), so as to then unfold through reason the various principles of application.

Deep Thinking is attainable only by a man of deep Feeling, and all Truth is a species of Revelation."

The development and progression of mind and consciousness from and to this realm of what the Greeks termed wisdom (philosophy being the systematic means of bringing wisdom from the Superconscious Mind ("The vision and the faculty divine") and individual sub-consciousness into the conscious mind) is what Coleridge terms “Method.”

From this Coleridge is led to conclude that there is a functional polarity: the productive power (dynamis), "which acts in nature as nature, is essentially one…with…the intelligence, which is in the human mind above nature." (BL) Given this “self-organising” power in nature, form then follows function, or form is developed not from without, but from within. While developing and once developed, it can be influenced from without (stimuli), but its formative forces lie within and work outward. The correlative of this is “that as the forms in all organized existence, so must all true and living knowledge proceed from within.” Knowledge is a proper exercise of mind, not the blind, mechanical collation of data along some presumed criteria for ordering. As Coleridge wrote of Bacon, who he saw as misunderstood and misinterpreted, "the truths which have their signatures in nature, and which (as he himself plainly and often asserts) may indeed be revealed to us through and with, but never by the senses, or the faculty of sense."

Thus, the role of mind becomes paramount. Where in Nature there are laws to keep everything in harmonious, dynamic whole, powered by a blind force (living principle), there must also be a similar force, but rational in essence, that works on and in man, what the Greeks termed the Logos, and its executive organ, the nous.

Coleridge sees two directions for the mind - outward and inward - reflecting the two givens of man's existence - the world “out there,” experienced through the physical senses and the world “in here,” experienced through man's thinking capacity. The "Sense" (German Sinn) polarically contrasted with "the inmost Mind" (Goethe's Gemüt) - "A science which derives its name and character from the Logos.. as distinguished from ... the Sense and from the Nous." (Treatise on Logic II, 38 and 39) and in his Essays on Method, Essay XI, "[There are] two forms of method, inseparably co-existent."

If the artist copies the mere nature, the natura naturata, what idle rivalry! If he proceeds only from a given form, which is supposed to answer to the notion of beauty, what an emptiness, what an unreality there always is in his productions, as in Cipriani's pictures! Believe me, you must master the essence [Wesen], the natura naturans, which presupposes a bond between [mother]nature in the higher sense and the soul of man [human nature]." (On Poesy or Art 1818)

There is a method for discovering both: the sensible world of nature out there (though also within us), via a simple desire to explore; and the super-sensible world of man's thought activity within. In essence, as Coleridge says: “The potential works in us [virtually] even as the actual works on us.”

Coleridge challenged two basic assumptions of inertial science: the absolute dichotomy between mind and matter (or subjective and objective), or the severed “outness” of nature; and the assumption as fact, that physical nature has acted always and at all times the same (“uniformitarianism”) – that is the assumption of a fixed “outness” of perceived objects (natura naturata).

The first follows from the second as uniformitarianism presupposes the fixed “outness” of appearances. However, as Coleridge understood, “outness” is not tenable philosophically or historically. For Coleridge, scientific method cannot be based on the absolute “outness” of things, but must involve accepting that an ‘object as experienced’ is, in plain terms, the object itself; and that there is no other, and somehow still more objective, object lurking coyly behind it (as Kant would have it).

== Theory of life ==
Man, being his own ground and starting point, (the scriptural I AM in that I AM or YHWH) is then confronted with the mystery of life. There is an apparent chain of being from the lowliest form of biological life to the highest. The highest is man himself, the one with the unique capability for self-awareness and self-reflection, thinking about things and even thinking about thinking, the highest form. It is also obvious that there are different kinds as well as degrees, seen in the distinction between minerals and animals, and between these two kingdoms and the plant kingdom. In the latter distinction, there also generally is seen the presence or absence of life. Matter, in the mineral form, is not dead, but what Saumarez termed "common matter," whereas plants and animals involve "living matter." This is what Coleridge terms “life biological” as for him, there is life in all of creation, life consisting of a dynamic polarity of forces, that is both inherent in the world as potential and acting inherently in all manifestation: "Thus, then, Life itself is not a thing—a self-subsistent hypostasis—but an act and process..". (Biographia Literaria)

This dynamic polarity produces motion, acts throughout all of creation, and via the power of the creative imagination, leads to the evolution of mind and consciousness. And the direction of this motion of the universe is towards increasing individuation, though there is also equal and opposite tendency of connection, the interaction of which leads to higher and higher individuation, "the one great end of Nature, her ultimate object."(Biographia Literaria)

This productive or generative power of life (Blumenbach's Bildungstrieb- Coleridge sat in on his lectures during his visit to Germany) exists in all manifestations of life. These manifestations are the finite product of the dynamic interaction of infinite and non-destructible forces, but its "productive energy is not extinguished in this product, but overflows, or is effluent…as the function of the body." (BL). Thus, the very nature of the “given” (IT IS) is contained in its manifestations such that the whole is contained in all the parts.

Life, that is, the essential polarity in unity ('multeity in unity') in Coleridge's sense also has a four beat cycle, different from the arid dialectics of abstraction - namely the tension of the polar forces themselves, the charge of their synthesis, the discharge of their product (indifference) and the resting or 'gathering' state of this new form (predominance). The product is not a neutralization, but a new form, a new creation or emergent, of the essential forces, these forces remaining within, though now as the functions of the form.

But as little can we conceive the oneness, except as the mid-point producing itself on each side; that is, manifesting itself on two opposite poles. Thus, from identity we derive duality, and from both together we obtain polarity, synthesis, indifference, predominance. (Biographia Literaria)

To make it adequate, we must substitute the idea of positive production for that of rest, or mere neutralization. To the fancy alone it is the null-point, or zero, but to the reason it is the punctum saliens, and the power itself in its eminence.

Matter, for Coleridge is the product of the dynamic forces - repulsion (centrifugal), and attraction (centripetal); it is not itself a productive power but a resultant. It is also forms the mass of a given body. The entire process of nature is this progressive unfolding of principle into matter, and then the increasing tendency to move inward that which was previously external, that is, to individuate forms.

With Coleridge, there is also a four-fold or bi-polarity of powers, forces and energies represented by the cross. Each power has itself two poles. In ancient philosophy this bi-polarity was represented by the four element theory - air, water, fire and earth and more modernly by the four-fold composition of matter - carbon (earth), hydrogen (fire), oxygen (water) and nitrogen (air).

This progressive unfolding of the initial dynamic principle into the dimensions of space and time leads to a trinity of 'life biological'.

My hypothesis will, therefore, be thus expressed, that the constituent forces of life in the human living body are—first, the power of length, or REPRODUCTION; second, the power of surface (that is, length and breadth), or IRRITABILITY; third, the power of depth, or SENSIBILITY. With this observation I may conclude these remarks, only reminding the reader that Life itself is neither of these separately, but the copula of all three… (Here we can also see the interchange between Schelling and Andreas Röschlaub in Germany in the context of Romantic medicine).

The study of sensibility gives rise to the issue of mind and consciousness. As a medical colleague lectured in this regard, the ‘ultimate end of organic nature is presented in the achievement of that sensibility ... by which the animal exists from itself, in itself, and, though imperfectly, for itself .... Now, this position is the same as to assert that a mind must be added to life, and consequently, that a transition from life to mind . . . must be assumed.’

Coleridge also sees that the instincts - hunger, thirst, mating - motivate growth and evolve into higher powers, the most important being that of desire which 'has something of the quality of the concept of imagination".

As Bostetter states: “The fact that he derives all the passions from the third vital power [Desire]–fundamentally a sexual power–shows how much aware he is of its importance.” And in linking it also to the mind elsewhere, shows how thought itself is a “sexual” function (Eureka!). With the study of the passions, the intermediate stage between life and the emergence of mind, Coleridge had in mind a system in which mind was both the passive goal and active agent in “life universal.” For Bostetter, his was a transcendentalism “in which a universal mind or life force created, flowed through, and, by process of evolution, shaped the physical universe.”

== Mind and polarity of powers ==
The Mind is bipolar in that intellect and reason comprise the 'sense' and nous poeticos and nous patheticos, the dual aspects of the nous itself, "the inmost nature" of mind.

The flux and reflux of the mind in all its subtlest thoughts and feelings…in its inmost nature - in modes of inmost being - the tremulous reciprocations of which propagate themselves even to the inmost of the soul. (Biographia Literaria)

For Coleridge, the mind was an action, a power not a thing, ('the mind's self-experience in the act of thinking') and in this power there are two powers, active and passive, with the imagination functioning in-between.

There are evidently two powers at work, which relatively to each other are active and passive; and this is not possible without an intermediate faculty, which is at once both active and passive. (BL)

Thus, the act of thinking presents two sides for contemplation, – that of external causality, in which the train of thought may be considered as the result of outward sensations, of accidental combinations, of fancy, or the associations of memory, –and on the other hand, that of internal causality, or of the energy of the will on the mind itself. Thought therefore, might be thus regarded as passive [reactive] or [pro]active. (BL)

== Imagination, desideration and polarity ==
Coleridge goes on to deal with this power of imagination that emerged from the third power of the passions - desideration. The emotions, if contemplated and “recollected in tranquility” produce objective, as opposed to subjective, feeling that can then be expressed aesthetically via symbols (Suzanne Langer). The 'poetic' imagination is essentially projective, producing projective art works, whilst the philosophic imagination of Coleridge is evocative and is used to draw out the meaning and essence of the symbols already extant in our surroundings. And these objective feelings, being linked to reality and the over-riding super-sensible determinant of that reality, act powerfully within the forms of nature and culture. As was expressed in the Preface to the Lyrical Ballads, "the power of the human imagination is sufficient to produce such changes even in our physical nature as might almost appear miraculous…" (This would point to the founder of the American New Thought movement, Phineas Parkhurst Quimby)

In a famous passage from his Biographia Literaria, Coleridge distinguishes between the primary imagination, which is the underlying agent of human perception, and the secondary imagination, which operates more in the conscious mind, and this is further polarized between its highest effort - new re-creation (unity through re-creation) - and its fallback - a struggle to unify through idealization.

The primary Imagination I hold to be the living power and prime agent of all human perception, and as a repetition in the finite mind of the eternal act of creation in the infinite I AM. [It acts by creating a oneness, even as nature, the greatest of poets, acts upon us when we open our eyes upon an extended prospect. ] The secondary Imagination I consider as an echo of the former, co-existing with the conscious will, yet still as identical with the primary in the kind of its agency, and differing only in degree, and in the mode of its operation. It dissolves, diffuses, dissipates, in order to recreate: or where this process is rendered impossible, yet still at all events it struggles to idealize and to unify. It is essentially vital, even as all objects (as objects) are essentially fixed and dead.(Biographia Literaria)

For Coleridge, poetry is idealistic and man needs to go beyond the projective forms of art, the belletristic arts, to another art form, this time where man as subject, draws out of nature, including human nature, the potential that is there in what we actually experience. For Romantic medicine, in particular, Andreas Röschlaub and Samuel Hahnemann, the art of remediation, to achieve a true health for the individual, was an evocative art, Heilkunde and Heilkunst, that sought, as in the ancient Greek idea of education, to educe, to elicit or draw out of the suffering individual what was potential (state of health) into actuality.

== Imagination and understanding ==
Imagination is active and acts while “hovering between images,” and when it fixes on a given image, it then becomes understanding. Communication of these images of the understanding is what Coleridge terms 'noetic ideation'. “Communication by the symbolic use of the Understanding is the function of Queen Imagination on behalf of Noetic Ideation.” In contrast, fancy is static and idealising, creating nothing real, but it does, as Colerdige notes, provide a “drapery” for the body of thought.

The power of imagination is evident in the relationship of reality between parts and whole, and the ability thereby to associate parts of the same whole (phenomenon) (association by contiguity) that are not ordinarily so associated in time and space (association by continuity), "the perception of similitude in dissimilitude" which "principle is the great spring of the activity of our minds, and their chief feeder." (Wordsworth's Preface to the Lyrical Ballads) Indeed, it is in the ability to see what is similar in what appears dissimilar, and what is dissimilar in what presents as similar (continuity) that resides the creative genius of a man.

Art is an artificial arrangement, that is to say, not that of crude nature, but nature re-arranged is “re-presented” to the mind of man so that there is a condensed unity of parts in a given representation (compare Literature with History). It is not an illusion, but a re-creation of nature's innate unity, unconscious and promiscuous, into a new unity.

[Art] is a figurative language of thought, and is distinguished from nature by the unity of all the parts in one thought or idea... Hence nature itself would give us the impression of a work of art, if we could see the thought which is present at once in the whole and in every part; and a work of art will be just in proportion as it adequately conveys the thought, and rich in proportion to the variety of parts which it holds in unity.

In re-presenting nature, the “poet” is not simply copying or distorting nature. But in order to do so, he "must master the essence, the natura naturans, which presupposes a bond between nature in the higher sense and the soul of man" or human nature. The wisdom of nature, the primal wisdom, is in man in the form of the body; it is participative, unconscious and instantaneous (instinctual). The wisdom of man has to be produced, re-created and given a conscious value or appraisal. It needs to be made coadunative, compresent by an act of will through objective feeling and noetic ideation. In this regard, the body wisdom (Walter Cannon) is striving to become conscious wisdom "in the human mind above nature."

...to make the external internal, the internal external, to make nature thought, and thought nature—this is the mystery of genius in the fine arts. Dare I add that the genius must act on the feeling, that body is but a striving to become mind—that it is mind in its essence? (Biographia Literaria)

== Intellect ==
The intellect is "the faculty of suiting measures to circumstances," or "the faculty judging according to sense." Intellect is linked initially to fancy, such that their functioning forms a law by which man "is impelled to abstract the changes and outward relations of matter and to arrange them under the form of causes and effects." This law is necessary for man's awareness and freedom, but if not conjoined with a new participative capacity (the Goethean Gemüt) would "prevent or greatly endanger man's development and progression." The intellect in man, as contrasted with animals, is the ability not only to obey rules, but to create them and to know what the term "rule" means. It is the possibility of sense experience. Sensation is "already intelligence in process of constructing itself." Thus, "intelligence is a self-development and sensation itself is but vision nascent, not the cause of intelligence, but intelligence itself revealed as an earlier power in the process of self-construction" working on the sense-data to provide names of objects and the relationships of their outer forms in terms of cause and effect (what Suzanne Langer terms 'figuration').

== Intellect and reason ==
The intellect also is to be distinguished from reason. The intellect, unirradiated by reason, is a faculty of the instinct, which man shares with the higher animals (cunning). It is subject to the physical laws of heredity, and the evolution from sense to passive understanding is an identical one in man and animal. In man, there is in addition its polar opposite, namely "active" intellect, which, in the form of conscious intent, is there in man all along as potential in contrast to the animal and forms the basis for criminal law (mens rea). The intellect is reactive as regards the sense pole and proactive as regards the pole of reason (the conceptual faculty).

For the [intellect] is in all respects a medial and mediate faculty, and has therefore two extremities or poles, the sensual, in which form it is St. Paul's φρονημα σαρκος [phronema sarkos - Romans 8., carnal mind] and the intellectual pole, or the hemisphere (as it were) turned towards the reason.

Reason essentially deals with principles and the intellect with concepts, both factual (physical) and functional (etheric). The noetic faculty deals with Ideas, which then are elaborated into principles by reason, whilst the intellect establishes concepts arranged using scalar logic (for ordination of facts) and polar logic (for functions). This provides a trinity of mind, wherein the intermediate faculty of imagination is the matrix connecting all of them.

Reason is present in the whole process of nature, yet is accessible only to the intellect. It is responsible for the awakening process in human consciousness from unconsciousness, through sleeping and dreaming to waking. Coleridge understood an ascent of consciousness from sense perception, wherein reason lies as potential only (Sleeping Beauty) to the apprehension of reason itself.

For Coleridge, intellect is "the faculty of rules" and reason "the source of principles." Intellect is the world of man, and human law, where the end can and often does justify the means. It is not the world of reason. It is the fact of reason's presence in nature that allows us to speak of it becoming apparent or "present to" the intellect, such that we have an ulterior consciousness that is behind the natural awareness (the "unconscious") of all animals, one that is self-reflective or "philosophic" though there is a purely 'mental' philosophy that Coleridge termed 'psilosophy' and that which involves also the noetic capacity of mind (the nous rather than just the mens) which is true philosophy in the Greek sense of 'love of wisdom' — philia "love", sophia "wisdom."

Plants are Life dormant; Animals = Somnambulists; the mass of Mankind Day-dreamers; the Philosopher only awake.

And this creates a functional identity between the philosophic imagination and instinct, as those who have the first, "...feel in their own spirits the same instinct, which impels the chrysallis of the horned fly to leave room in its involucrum for antennae yet to come. They know and feel that the potential works in them, even as the actual works on them."

What renders the intellect human (that is, active) is precisely the ability to identify by naming (nominalism), that is, to abstract or generalize, for it is from this ability that we get the human ability of speech. And it is in speech or language that we first see this irradiation of the intellect by reason. Animals may generalize, but they do not name, they do not have the power of abductive inference. Reason makes its mark in the form of the grammar of a language. Thus, the higher understanding is concerned not only with names, but then only with names (denominating) as describing appearances, not content.

...in all instances, it is words, names or, if images, yet images used as words or names, that are the only and exclusive subject of understanding. In no instance do we understand a thing in itself; but only the name to which it is referred.

Reason exists in language in the form of grammar (principles of language), though not in idioms which transcend the rational structure).

It is grammar that reflects the forms of the human mind, and gradually familiarises the half-conscious Boy with the fram and constitution of his own Intellect, as the polished Glass does the unconscious infant with the features of his own countenance…bringing about that power of Abstraction, by which as the condition and the means of self-knowledge, the reasoning Intellect of Man is distinguished in kind from the mechanical [intellect] of the Dog, the Elephant, the Bee, the Ant, and whatever other animals display an intelligence that we cannot satisfactorily reduce to mere Instinct…

It is the power to abstract from experience that makes us human, but this power must become a means to an end, not an end in itself, as in material science. That end is imagination and reason, and then, for Coleridge, on to the 'organ' of noetic ideation, the Greek nous..

In instinct we are united with nature, in intellection we are detached from nature, and in imagination re-united with nature. If we make passive understanding (intellection)- the power of abstraction - an end in itself, we become according to Coleridge "a race of animals, in whom the presence of reason is manifested solely by the absence of instinct." This means that we become slaves to the idols of our own making (the appearances of things) "falling prostrate before lifeless images, the creatures of his own abstraction, [man] is himself sensualized, and becomes a slave to the things of which he was formed to be the conqueror and sovereign."

Without reason, we are but animals and commit existential suicide, submitting, as earlier Sophists, "all positions alike, however heterogeneous, to the criterion of the mere [intellect]." By shutting out reason we end up in a world of opinions, authority-based law, instruction, material science, and the death of spirit and soul. Enlightenment becomes the tyranny of the intellect and good intentions end up on the guillotine of the intellect. Abstraction turned back on itself, becomes dependent on the senses and the outer appearances, or the despotism of the eye and "leads to a science of delusion" as Coleridge stated. The so-called Enlightenment was more the "deliberate shuttering of the [intellect] from the light of reason."

Without reason, the intellect becomes active under the impulsion of fancy, such that "the omission to notice what not is being noticed will be supposed not to exist" or "to limit the conceivable within the bounds of the perceivable", which is the tyranny or despotism of the physical eye.

Reason irradiates the human psyche at all levels as it is, for Coleridge, in seed form even at the lowest level of consciousness. It is the original impetus for self-projection or individuation as Coleridge put it. Reason is a unity not itself divisible, as it can only be used in the singular, unlike intellect and intellects.

The intellect operating at the sense pole provides the power that leads to abstraction and man's separation from nature, but also awareness of self as separate from nature and God. However, detachment can lead to existential despair without the 'light of reason' to provide a new attachment or relationship to nature and God, one based on individual sovereignty. With reason, the nisus is from sense to consciousness and finally to self-consciousness, that is, individuation. Until reason is consciously apprehended, we remain in a plant or animal-like state of consciousness, but when apprehended, we are "awake" (reborn in spirit). The last stage requires the active understanding, which is the intellect fully irradiated by reason, itself irradiated by Nous.

There are evidently two powers at work, which relatively to each other are active and passive; and this is not possible without an intermediate faculty, which is at once both active and passive...In philosophical language, we must denominate this intermediate faculty in all its degrees and determinations, the IMAGINATION, the compleating power which unites clearness with depth, the plenitude of the sense with the comprehensibility of the [intellect], impregnated with which the [intellect] itself becomes [understanding]– an intuitive and living power. (Biographia Literaria)

This then allows for “speculation,” which is the Baconian realisation of the natural idea out of natura naturata, or the outer appearances of things, guided by the forethoughtful inquiry (lumens siccum) coming from what Coleridge termed the more inmost part of the mind, the noetic capacity or nous. Without such irradiation from both the nous and reason, we end up with “lawless flights of speculation” (Coleridge). Lawful speculation, however, could then be processed by the new Greek or Goethean participative (coadunative, compresent) capacity (Gemüt), and worked up into a phenomenological presentation.

Reason without the focus on sense experience is “pure reason” (Rudolf Steiner's “pure thinking” or pure sinnen) and in that condition, reason is able to make contact with and be irradiated itself by wisdom. Copernican reason (Aristarchus) allowed us to comprehend the universal verus the Ptolemaic intellect which kept us 'earthbound' in terms of our point of reference. Our individuation culminates in what Coleridge terms "the fullness of intelligence."

The light of reason is thus both the origin and the abiding basis of individuality. Without the positive presence of reason to the understanding [intellect], there is no individuality, only the detachment which individual being presupposes. Reason, in both its negative and its positive aspect, is the individualiser. Reason itself unirradiated (by the Nous) leads to the dominance of the collective (Hegel's State) over the individual.

== Reason and self-consciousness ==
Reason operating consciously in us through the imagination is the act of self-consciousness, the “I AM.” Reason, via the intellect also enables initially the mind's detachment from nature, creating 'subject' and 'object.' It provides for the power to behold polarities and indeed shows itself "out of the moulds of the understanding only in the disguise of two contradictory conceptions." To avoid being propelled into existential nihilsm, we then need to use the active side of reason ('productive unity'), such that reason is "the tendency at once to individuate and to connect, to detach, but so as either to retain or to reproduce attachment."

To go from the indirect moonlight of mere intellect (mirrored through sense experience) to the direct sunlight of active understanding (irradiated by reason) is to go from exterior perception (of appearances) to a universal ulterior appercetion of phenomena (phenomenology); "it is to pass on from fancy's business of arranging and re-arranging the 'products of destruction, the cadavera rerum,' to imagination's business with 'the existence of absolute life,' or Being, which is the 'correlative of truth.'" (Biographia Literaria) It is also to go from the delusion that diversity is division or that a concept held by two minds is two concepts, rather than two exemplars of one concept.

The power that allows reason to act on the intellect so as to raise it and make it active, as understanding, is the creative or secondary imagination.

... all the products of the mere reflective faculty [moulds of intellect] partook of death, and were as the rattling twigs and sprays in winter, into which a sap was yet to be propelled from some root... (Biographia Literaria)

... the IMAGINATION, the compleating power which unites clearness with depth, the plenitude of the sense with the comprehensibility of the [intellect], impregnated with which the [intellect] itself becomes [understanding]– an intuitive and living power..(Biographia Literaria)

And the apparent contradictions revealed initially by passive reason, are really the dynamic functions of life, and this can only be perceived by the active power of reason, which involves the imagination.

Polarity, being 'incompatible with the mathematical calculus,' is not graspable by the understanding [intellect], but only in the imagination; in fact we have already had occasion to specify it as the basic act of imagination.

And reason is also part of the Logos for Coleridge ("the Word or Logos is life, and communicates life" and it is also "light, and communicates light," the light of positive reason, or Nous). The negative form of reason, which is the capability God gave man to comprehend the divine light, is light in its potential form, though the darkness of the mere intellect may fail to comprehend it.

== Theory of language ==
"Words are living powers, not merely articulated air." Language is to consciousness what geometry is to space and mathematics to time. It is language, not sense experience, that orients mind to reality.

For Coleridge, language in its highest form, is the very tool and vehicle for understanding reality and the basis for the evolution of mind and consciousness. He takes as the foundation our immediate living experience of things (Thomas Reid's Common Sense) as well as of our very self - the mind as dynamic act. Words, for Coleridge, reveal the creative mind, working via the power of imagination (versus the power of fancy) to reveal reality (not to create artifacts of experience). However, there is a difference between the popular, descriptive use of language, which "as objects are essentially fixed and dead," and the more serious discursive, scholarly use of language. Beyond that there is the 'best part of language', the language of disclosure, which discloses by the very use of precise, desynonimized terms.

This 'disclosive' language emerges as a result of the cultivation of profound (objective) feeling (Suzanne Langer), and deep thought (involving the inmost mind (nous), in both its nether (the nous patheticos, or Goethe's Gemüt) and upper aspects (nous poieticos or Rudolf Steiner's Geist). Here, the full mind, both mental and noetic, not just the intellect and reason, is active in establishing the meaning of words. Disclosive language taps into and contains the 'fullness of intelligence', expressing living experience (Erlebniss in German). This disclosive language is also one that evolves along with man's consciousness and the progress of science, in that terms come more and more to be desynonymized, such as the famous distinction Coleridge made between imagination and fancy and awareness and consciousness. Coleridge's view was in contrast to the predominant Lockean tradition: for Locke, static concepts and their verbal exponents arise from experience, whereas for Coleridge the proper use of language is a dynamic or romantic event between mind and nature.

Coleridge's definition of "word" represents language as participating intimately in the complex relation between mind and world" "Coleridge presents language as the principal vehicle for the interaction of the knowing mind and known reality.

Thus, for Coleridge, language, that is, the different true forms of the one Logos, discloses to us the very content and activity of cognition, and that since 'mind is an act', language is the means for the evolution of mind and consciousness (Logos, the evolver). Initially, Coleridge focussed on poetry as the source of living experience in words, but later came to understand that poetry was 'essentially ideal" and that the poetic imagination 'struggles to idealize' and to "spread (project) a tone around forms, incidents and situations." One had to go beyond poetry and the poetic imagination, into the 'verbal imagination' to get at the true power of language to use "words that convey feelings and flash images" to disclose reality via the common ethereal element of our being.

This involves a participative capacity of mind to create a dynamic between mind and word, so that the minds of the reader or listener and the writer or speaker create a co-adunation or compresence (Samuel Alexander). This capacity involves not just the abstracting Latin intellect (mens), but the re-emergent participative Greek nous. Coleridge referred to this new capacity of mind, using the nous to irradiate the Latin mens, as an 'ulterior consciousness'. And this capacity of mind to participate mind is an 'ethereal medium." Mind is at the very foundation of being of man and much more than the sum of sense experience, and the purpose of his method is "to render the mind intuitive of the spiritual [non-sensible] in man" and develop "this ulterior consciousness". The medium of the compresence of minds ("spiritual intercourse") is "the common ethereal element of their being, the tremulous reciprocations [tremulations] of which propagate themselves even to the inmost of the soul." (BL)

Language is both an expression and motive force for the evolution of consciousness; the history of words is a history of mind (see Owen Barfield's History in English Words). For Coleridge, creation is "the language of God" (Logos), and this can be read in the realms of nature, culture and spirit.

== Romantic cognosis ==
At the core of the idea of romanticism is romantic cognosis, or 'co-gnosis', the dynamic interplay of masculine and feminine forces and energies in the mind and imagination, involving a dyadic unit of consciousness right from the beginning (Genesis: 'male and female made he them'). Coleridge speaks of "the feminine mind and imagination," and provides the polaric example of the two giants of English literature, Shakespeare ("darts himself forth and passes into all the forms of human character and passion") and Milton ("attracts all forms and things to himself" which "shape themselves anew" in him). For Coleridge, "imagination is both active and passive", that is, masculine and feminine in nature. He also provides a similar polarity between the essentially passive primary imagination, that (spontaneously, reactively) configures sensory experience ("a repetition in the finite mind of the eternal act of creation in the infinite I AM"), and the active secondary imagination that 'dissolves, diffuses and dissipates in order to re-create' via the higher state of mind and consciousness. Coleridge also distinguished between the poetic imagination, which is essentially projective, and the philosophic imagination, which is essentially pro-active ("the scared power of self-intuition, [which] can interpret and understand the symbols" inherent in the world around us).

For Coleridge, the life which is in each of us is in other people and things out there as well, allowing for communication between Mother nature and human nature, as well as between individuals. At the level of mind, ideas are 'mysterious powers, living, seminal, formative' and "essentially one with the germinal causes in nature. Goethe's identification and elaboration of the Gemüt as the organ of mind for participating the living essence or Wesen of nature, whether in Mother or human nature, is what Coleridge termed our 'inmost mind'.

In addition to the dynamic polarity between masculine and feminine principles of mind and consciousness, Coleridge identified "the pleasure principle" as the "chief principle" and "great spring of activity of our minds", from which "the sexual appetence and all the passions connected with it take their origin.

== See also ==
- Organic form
