= Giovanni Rasori =

Italian academic

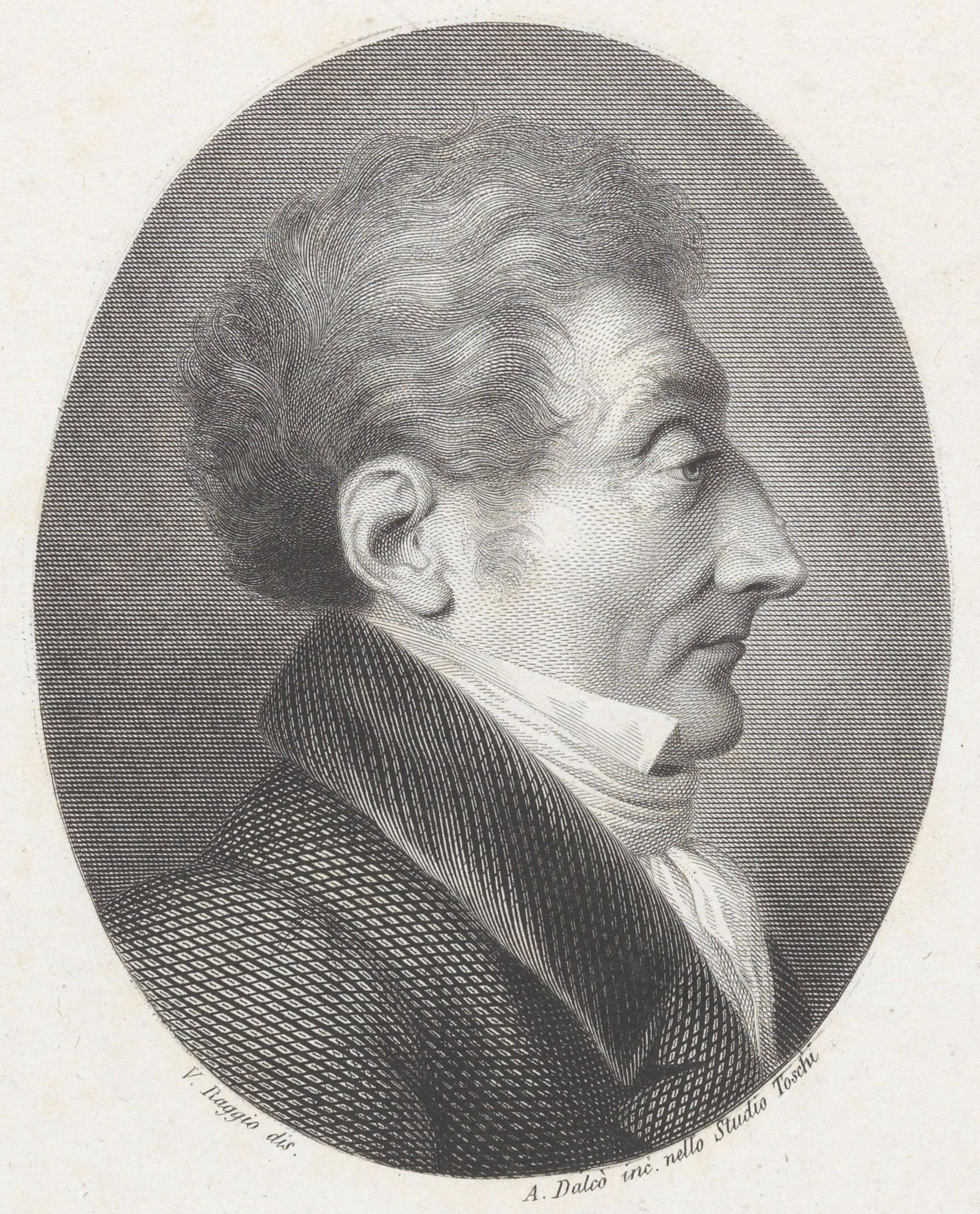
Giovanni Rasori

Giovanni Rasori (1766–1837) was an Italian academic, medical doctor and translator.

== Career ==
Rasori was born in Parma. He began studying at the university of that city with results so brilliant that he deserved the interest of Ferdinand, Duke of Parma that allowed him to complete his studies at the University of Florence, Pavia, London and Paris, where he remained fascinated by the illuminist and pre-revolutionary climate of the time. In Parma, he was a pupil of the anatomist Flaminio Torrigiani.

Rasori graduated in medicine and philosophy, he immediately gained fame by devoting himself to translating the works of the Scottish physician John Brown. His career was lightning fast: soon he became rector of the prestigious Collegio Ghislieri, to be later appointed professor of medical pathology at the University of Pavia in 1795, as well as rector of the same university in 1797.

Rasori published an Italian translation of Erasmus Darwin's Zoonomia (Milan, 1803-1805). The translation remained in print but was banned in 1817 under Pope Pius VII. A later edition was published in Naples, 1820. Rasori was supportive of ideas of spontaneous generation and transmutation of species.

Strongly opposed to the Austrian domination, he voluntarily enlisted in the Cisalpine army and, after the battle of Marengo, he moved to Milan where he became physician of the Cisalpine Republic and later of the Italian Republic. In this capacity he was sent to Genoa to decide and coordinate the sanitary operations necessary to eradicate the epidemic of intestinal fever that had hit the city, following the prolonged and joint siege by the Austrian troops and the British navy.

From 1806 he taught medical clinic at the Policlinico of Milan. On November 26, 1814, Rasori was arrested while participating in a meeting of anti-Austrian conspirators, better known as the " Brescian-Milanese military conspiracy". Sentenced to prison, he was freed in 1818, but he did not regain any teaching duties.

Rasori dedicated his last twenty years to the study and practice of the medical profession in the city of Milan, where he died in 1837.

== Contributions to Romantic medicine ==
A Compendium of Brown's New Medical Doctrine, translated into Italian (1792).

Rasori is widely recognized as the closing figure of the 18th-century "Romantic physicians" and the pioneer of modern experimental pharmacology in Italy. After translating John Brown's Elementa Medicinae in 1792, he initially championed the Brunonian system but gradually radically modified it, introducing the "counterstimulus theory" (or "Rasorism").

Unlike Brown, who believed that pathology depended entirely on the tissue's internal capacity to respond to stimuli, Rasori argued that diatheses were determined by the intrinsic nature of the stimuli themselves. He categorized clinical conditions and therapeutic agents into two distinct forces:

- Stimuli (sthenic): characterized by an excess of vital activity, to be treated with debilitating remedies.
- Contra-stimuli (asthenic): characterized by a depression of vital functions, requiring stimulating treatments.

Rasori formulated his medical framework primarily in Storia della febbre petecchiale di Genova (1813) and later in La teoria della flogosi (1837). To ground his theory empirically, he conducted extensively documented pharmacological tests on animals to observe the absorption, tolerance, and elimination of active principles—such as antimony tartrate for inflammatory diseases, or Digitalis for pneumonia. He also relied heavily on bloodletting (phlebotomy) to fight excess stimulation, developing a multiple-bleeding technique known as the "Rasori method".

By basing diagnoses on the pharmacological response of the patient (the criterion ex juvantibus et nocentibus), Rasori shifted Italian pathology toward a dynamic, vitalistic system that rejected mechanical materialism, making his doctrine a cornerstone of Southern European Romantic medicine.

== Works ==
Theory of inflammation (Teoria della flogosi), by Giovanni Rasori, 1837.

- Lettera al dott. Pietro Rubini, 1793
- Rapporto sullo stato dell'Università di Pavia, 1797
- Storia della febbre epídemica di Genova negli anni 1799 e 1800, 1801
- Osservazioni sul prospetto dei risultati della clinica medica nel R. Spedal militare di S. Ambrogio in Milano, 1808
- Storia della febbre petecchiale di Genova, 1813
- Sul metodo degli studi medici, 1809
- Analisi del preteso genio d'Ippocrate, 1821
- Opuscoli di medicina clinica, 1830
- Teoria della flogosi, 1837
- Principii nuovi di terapeutica. Opera postuma, 1842
- Due versioni poetiche dal tedesco, 1867
- Ricordi di prigionia, 1919
- I carteggi rasoriani della Biblioteca Palatina, 1967

=== Translations ===
- Compendio della Nuova Dottrina Medica, by John Brown, 1792
- Zoonomia, ovvero leggi della vita organica, by Erasmus Darwin, 1803-1805
- Lettere intorno alla mimica, by Johann Jakob Engel, 1818
