= Piloty =

Piloty is a surname:

- Karl von Piloty (1826–1886), German painter
- Ferdinand Piloty (der Ältere; 1786–1844), German lithographer
- Ferdinand von Piloty (der Jüngere; 1828–1895), German painter and illustrator
- Oskar Piloty (1866–1915), German chemist
- Robert Piloty (1924–2013), Computer scientist
