= John Brown (physician, born 1735) =

Scottish physician (1735–1788)

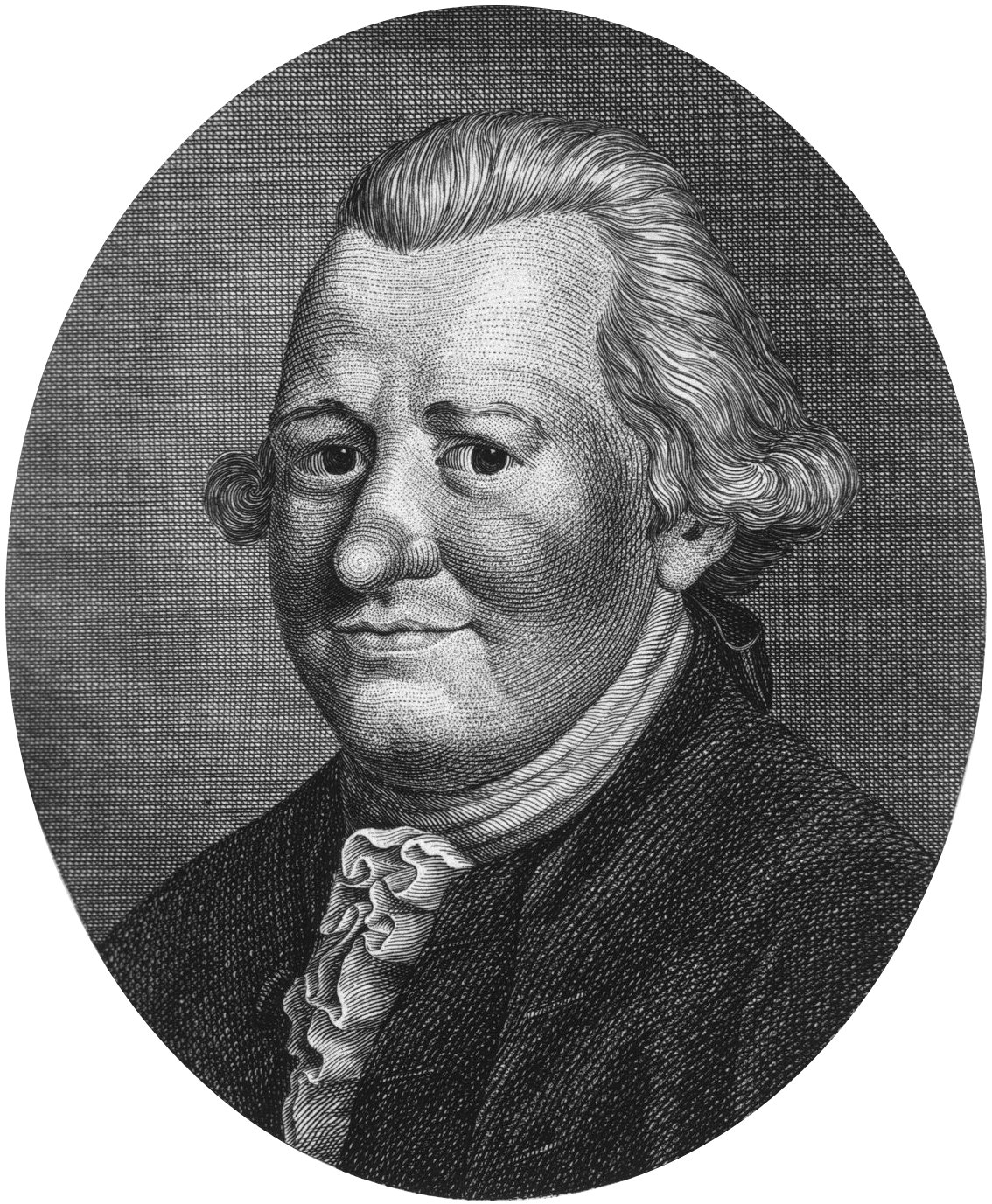
- John Brown
- Born: 1735; Berwickshire, Scotland, Kingdom of Great Britain
- Died: 17 October 1788 (aged 52–53); London, Kingdom of Great Britain
- Education: University of Edinburgh
- Occupation: Doctor
- Known for: Creator of the Brunonian system of medicine

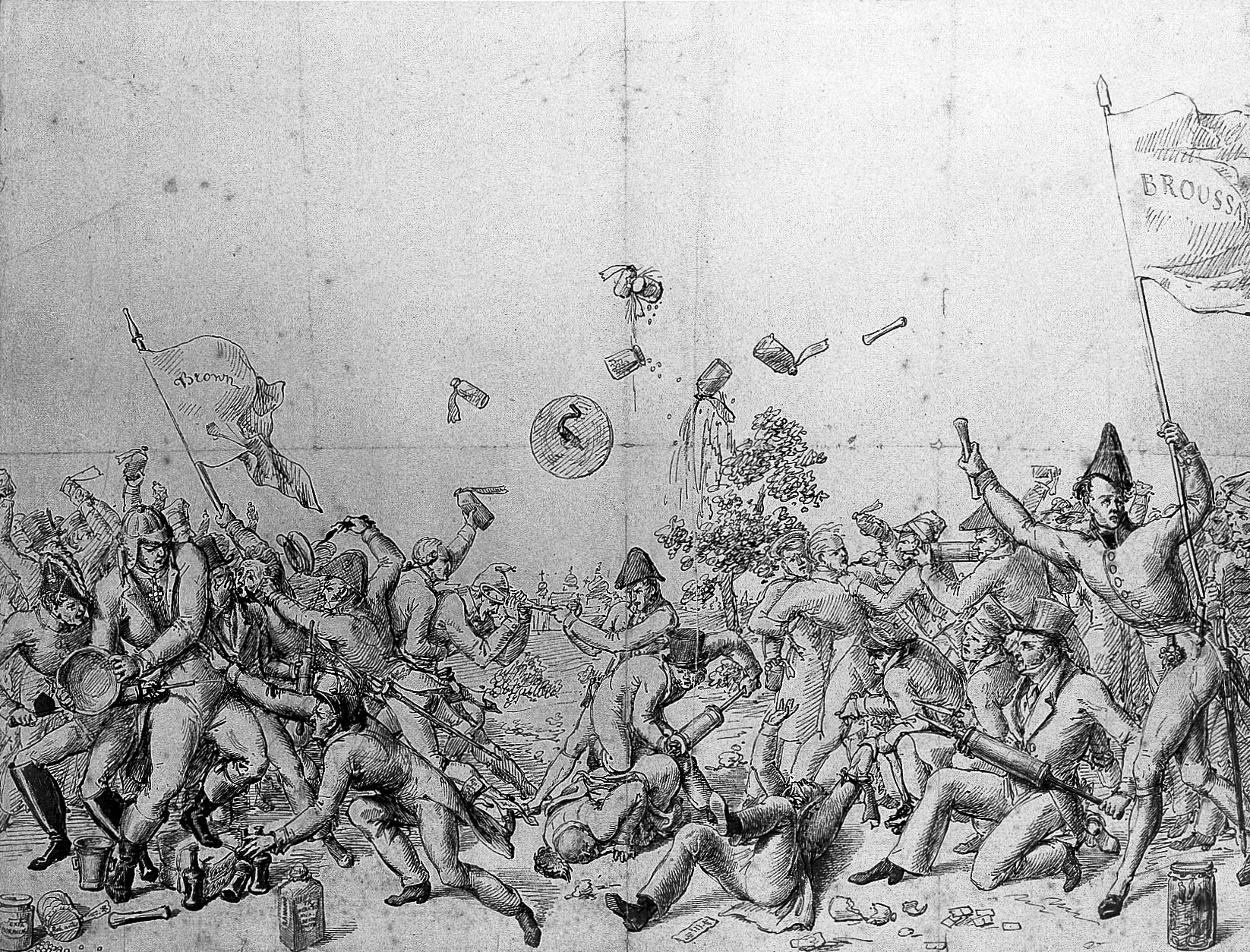
Depiction of a brawl between Brunonian and anti-Brunonian students.

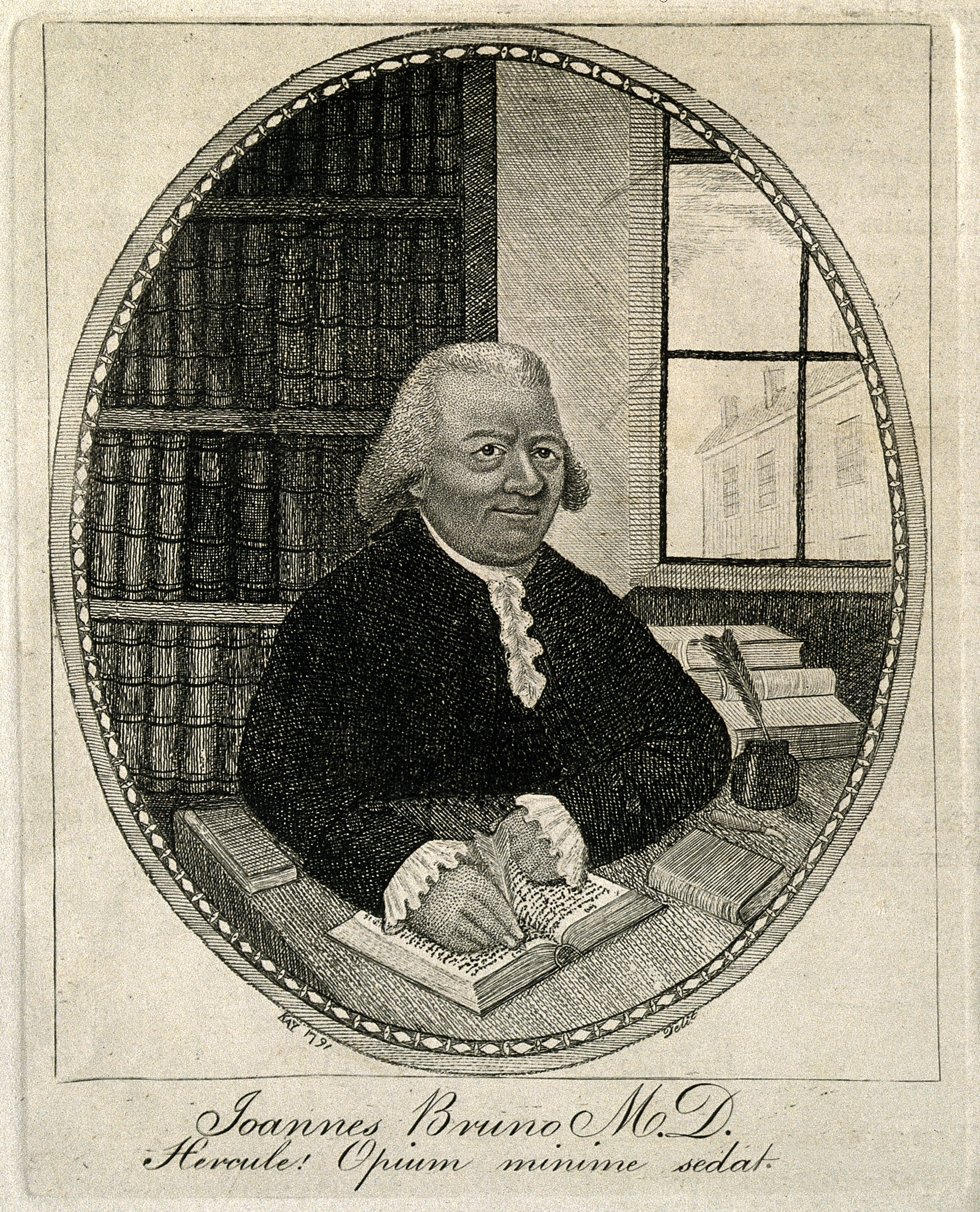
John Brown, as depicted by the Edinburgh artist John Kay.

John Brown (1735 – 17 October 1788) was a British physician from Berwickshire, Scotland who created the Brunonian system of medicine.

== Life ==
Brown was born in Berwickshire, the son of a day-labourer. He was able to obtain an early and 'excellent classical education' from Mr. William Cruickshank, "one of the most celebrated teachers Scotland has produced." Brown had a particular ability for Latin, and was an early reader, having read the whole of the Old Testament by age 5. As one of his contemporaries, Thomas Beddoes, a renowned fellow physician, wrote in 1795: "I conclude that he was endowed with that quickness of sympathy and that sensibility to the charms of nature, which characterize the infancy of genius."

He was forced, however, to leave the parish school at Duns, Scottish Borders due to his family's poverty, and was apprenticed to a local weaver. His son later wrote, for someone so "highly cultivated": "it may be readily conceived how truly disgusting the sordid life of one of the lowest mechanical businesses must have proved." Brown left, at the age of twenty, and headed to Edinburgh, enrolled in divinity classes at the University of Edinburgh, and worked part-time as a private tutor. In 1759 he discontinued his theological studies, began the study of medicine, and became the private tutor for the family of the leading Edinburgh physician William Cullen. He also became the Latin secretary for Cullen, and also was treated effectively as an assistant professor. In 1761 Brown became a member of the Royal Medical Society in Edinburgh, which Cullen has helped to found.

Brown played a role in the passionate debates in the Society regarding the reform of medical theory and practice, which had been inaugurated by Albrecht von Haller regarding neuropsychology and promoted by Cullen in Edinburgh.

Due to his own experiences and understanding, Brown began to formulate his own conception of the nature of life and illness that differed from his mentor, Cullen. This led to various personal disputes as well with Cullen and the professors of the university, though supported by many students. As one account stated: "Cullen estranged the mind of his Latin Secretary" and "ceased to hold any communication" with Brown or "even to mention his name."

In the face of this opposition to his views, Brown set out to give public lectures, contained attacks on preceding systems of medicine, including Cullen's. He received his medical degree from St Andrews in 1780 as he had been barred from graduating at Edinburgh University due to his 'heretical' views. That same year he published his formal explication and defense of his proposed reform of medicine, Elementa Medicinae. That year he was also elected, by his pupils and admirers, senior president of the Royal Medical Society. Despite this popularity, Brown was shunned by the medical profession and the upper classes in Edinburgh, causing him financial difficulties, and forcing him to arrange for his students to graduate through the University of Aberdeen, as the medical faculty at Edinburgh had banned the mention of Brown's teachings in any inaugural dissertations.

In 1786, Brown decided to try to further his career and resolve his financial difficulties by moving to London. However, he ended up in debtor's prison, where he died one evening in 1788 at the age of fifty-two, just after he had managed to publish the third edition of his main work, in English, Elements of Medicine.

== Theory of Medicine ==
In 1780, he published his Elementa Medicinae (Elements of Medicine in its English version), which for a time was an influential text. It set out his theories, often called the Brunonian system of medicine, which essentially understood all diseases as a matter of over or under-stimulation. John Brown's theory focused on outside factors, which would excite the body and lead to different diseases and the presentation of various symptoms. The stimulation was seen as excitability; hence the relation of Brunonian medicine and excitants. John Brown argued that any symptoms of disease or behavior which strayed from that of a healthy individual suggested over-excitement of the body. For instance, even a person presenting as weak had been over-excited. Brown labeled over-stimulation as the sthenic state and under-stimulation as the asthenic state. For sthenic diseases, Brown's treatments included vomiting, cold air, and purging. For asthenic diseases, Brown prescribed opium, roast beef, and alcoholic beverages. He wrote that "all life consists in stimulus, and both over-abundance and deficiency is productive of diseases."

Brown described medicine as related to excitement and his medicine was seen as mechanical to certain individuals and dynamic to others. For instance, Immanuel Kant perceived the system as highly mechanical and related it to mathematics. This system explained disease as the imbalance of excitants and could be quantified. Kant believed that this quantification could be used to explain the cause of disease and lead to medicine to cure or fix this imbalance. On the other hand, an avid follower in Germany, Andreas Röschlaub, perceived Brunonian medicine as an example of natural philosophy and as a changing theory. He saw this practice of medicine as a way to explain relationships between nature and man. This notion was rooted in pathology and relation of the outside world to man and his disease or illness.

In his work, Brown outlined and explained which excitants were good and bad for the body. The Brunonian system of treatment was intended to outline specific treatments for symptoms and to simplify medicine. This system was also simple enough that many physicians could practice according to Brunonianism, as it did not require extensive anatomical knowledge or association of specific outward symptoms with certain diseases. Due to this simplicity, among other reasons, it became very popular in countries such as Germany.

== Impact in Europe ==
His medical ideas proved highly influential for the next few decades, especially in Italy and Germany. As his medical theory was based on the principle that all disease was caused by an unbalance of "excitability", which referred to the body's ability to react to stimuli, he believed that excitement could be measured mathematically similar to the use of degrees on a thermometer. At this time in Germany, many physicians were attempting to change and revamp the medical curriculum and theories. German physicians wanted a system rooted in science which would give a scientific explanation to diseases, as the medical world began to emphasize science. John Brown's theory explained the relationship between the outside world, causing excitement, and the body, which was stimulated by the world. Brown's Elementa Medicinae did notably well in Germany, first translated and published in German by Adam M. Weikard in 1795. Weikard received a copy of the book from student Andreas Röschlaub, who had received a copy from a visiting friend. Other translations of Brown's work began to appear around Germany, included an edition from Christof Pfaff in 1796, followed by another edition of this translated book in 1798. Röschlaub, the student who had introduced Brown's work to the academic scene, later published his own translation and titled it as John Brown's sämtliche Werke. Röschlaub, an avid follower of John Brown, also worked with Adalbert Marcus to create a new medical system, which they implemented in a hospital in Bamberg. The new system was called Erregbarkeitstheorie concerning excitability and this system borrowed from Brown's system and the idea that excitement could be quantified. The hospital in Bamberg, which became a hub for medicine, included the principles from Brown's theory and helped create a prestigious institute. In time, however, there were arguments concerning the validity and accuracy of this system in Germany.

Jacob Friedrich Ludwig Lentin's Medizinische Bemerkungen auf ein literarischen Reise durch Deutschland (1800) talked about German medicine being dominated by the struggles of Brunonians and "anti-Brunonian terrorists." There are also reports of 400 students rioting in a dispute between the two sides in the German university city of Göttingen in 1802. One critic of John Brown's theory was August von Kotzebue, who wrote plays to reflect his disdain for this theory of medicine. In his plays he would portray Brunonianism and doctors who practiced this method in a negative light. Magazines and newspapers in Germany also reflected varying ideas on John Brown's system, some positive and some negative and critical. Röschalub's Magazin would support Brunonian medicine and promoted the system amidst criticisms from other publications at the time. Discussion on John Brown began to cease after 1809 with the end of Röschalub's Magazin. During a typhoid outbreak in 1813–1814 Brown's Brunonian medicine was briefly referenced as Germans attempted to remedy the illness. By 1817, however, the German historian of medicine Kurt Sprengel suggested that Brunonian medicine "has very few supporters." Once again, Brunonian medicine came back in the 1820s, and was in the spotlight again as François-Joseph-Victor Broussais rose to fame. Broussais, a French physician, was becoming very popular in the beginning of the 1820s and his medicinal theory was based on John Brown's own Brunonian medicine. Brown had also become a famous historical figure in Germany by 1846, when Bernhard Hirschel published a study on his system and the effects of Brunonian medicine. However, Brunonianism began to decline as physicians did not believe is adequately provided a scientific explanation to diseases and illnesses.

== Freemasonry ==
Brown was a Scottish Freemason. He was Initiated in Lodge Canongate Kilwinning, No.2, on 28 November 1835. He is described as being the 'Founder of the Brownonian system of medicine.'

== Death ==
In 1786, Brown went to London to improve his fortunes but died of apoplexy two years later, on 17 October 1788.

In 1789 a Cambridge undergraduate called William Margetson Heald published The Brunoniad, a mock epic poem about Brown, mocking his consumption of alcohol and opium and referring to a bar brawl in Dunn's Hotel in Edinburgh's New Town.

== Legacy ==
In 1795, a critical edition of Brown's Elements of Medicine was published by the well-known physician Thomas Beddoes for the benefit of Brown's widow and children. An edition of Brown's works, with a biography by his son William Cullen Brown, appeared in 1804.

Brown was the grandfather of the artist Ford Madox Brown and the great-great grandfather of the novelist Ford Madox Ford.
