= Brunonian =

Brunonian or Brunonians usually refer to alumni of Brown University and Pembroke College in Brown University. The terms may also refer to:

- The Brunonian, a predecessor and rival newspaper of The Brown Daily Herald
- Brunonian system of medicine
- Brunonids, a Saxon noble family in the 10th and 11th centuries
