= Robert Cullen =

Robert Cullen may refer to:

- Robert Cullen (footballer) (born 1985), Japanese footballer for Dutch side VVV-Venlo
- Robert Cullen, Lord Cullen (1742–1810), Scottish judge

== See also ==
- Robb Cullen, writer, actor and producer
- Robert
- Cullen (disambiguation)
