= William Cullen =

Scottish physician and scientist (1710–1790)

William Cullen FRS FRSE FRCPE
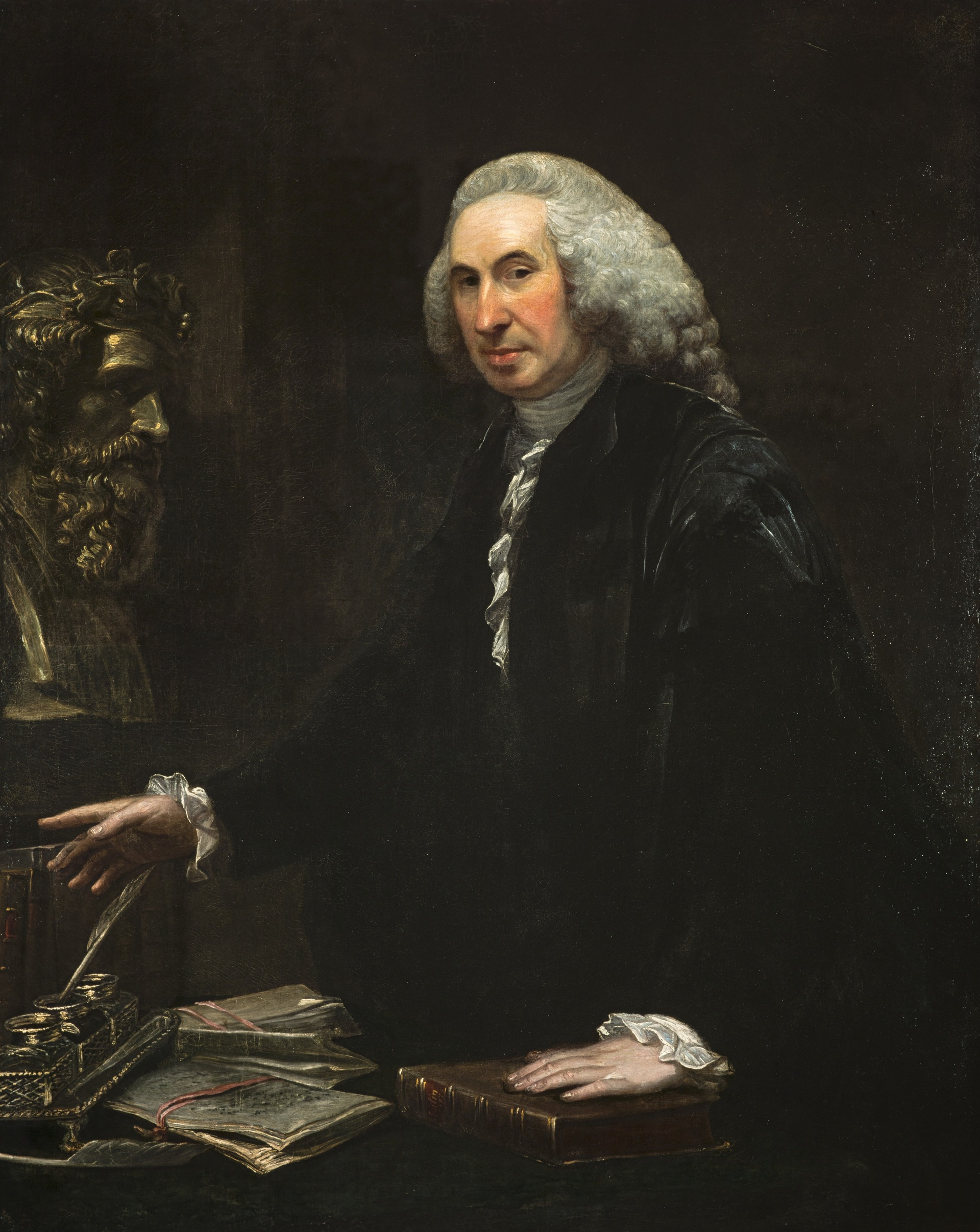
- Portrait by David Martin, 1776
- Born: 15 April 1710; Hamilton, Scotland
- Died: 5 February 1790 (aged 79); Edinburgh, Scotland
- Citizenship: British
- Education: University of Glasgow; University of Edinburgh
- Known for: Teaching at the Edinburgh Medical School; author of popular medical textbook First Lines of the Practice of Physic; Scottish Enlightenment figure; mentor of Joseph Black; refrigeration work
- Scientific career
- Fields: Medicine; chemistry; agriculture; physics
- Notable students: Joseph Black; Benjamin Rush; John Walker; John Morgan; George Fordyce; William Withering; John Haygarth; John Moore; John Brown; Robert Willan; Sir Gilbert Blane; John Coakley Lettsom; William Hunter

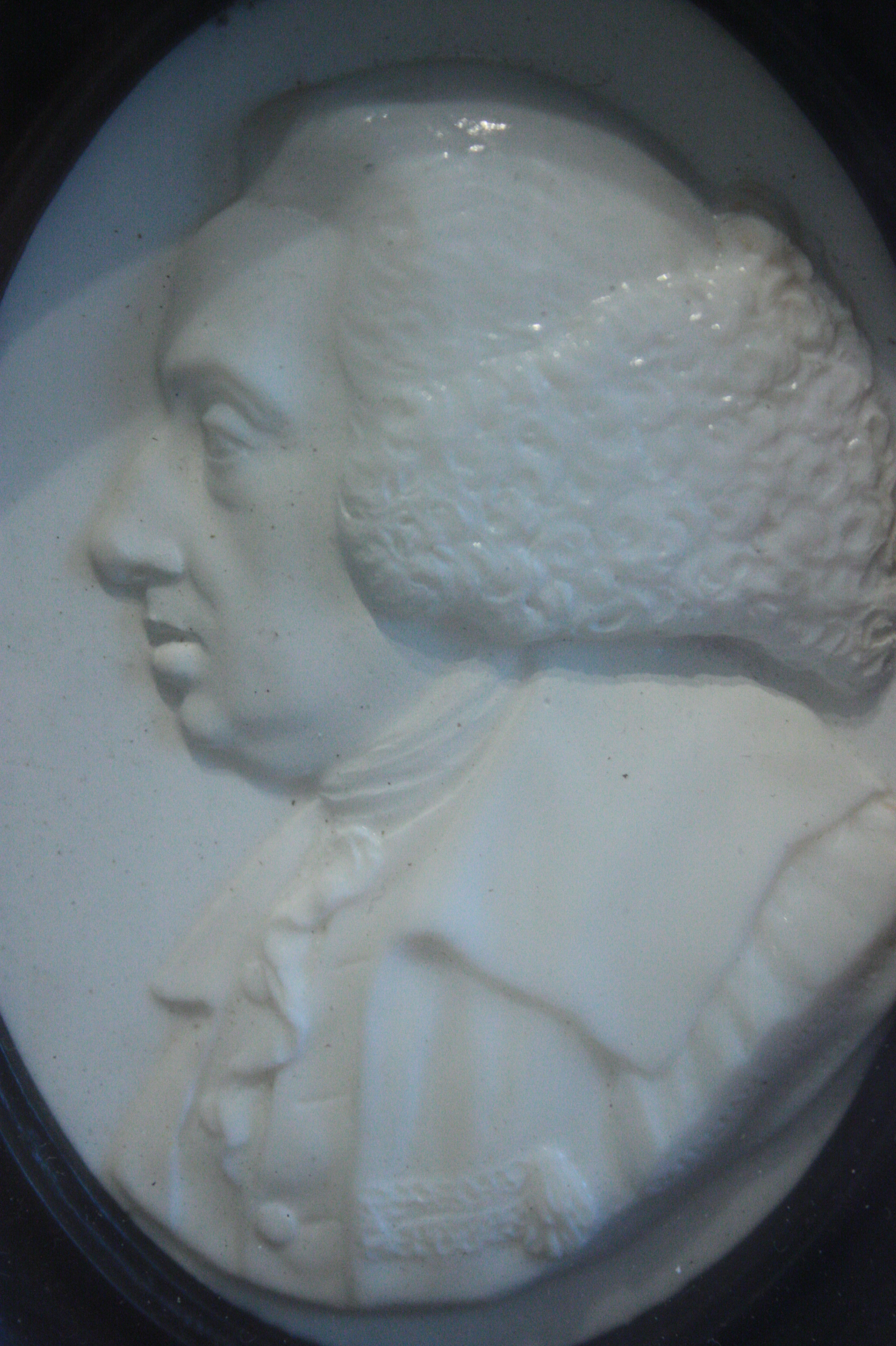
Cameo of William Cullen (close-up), Hunterian Museum, Glasgow

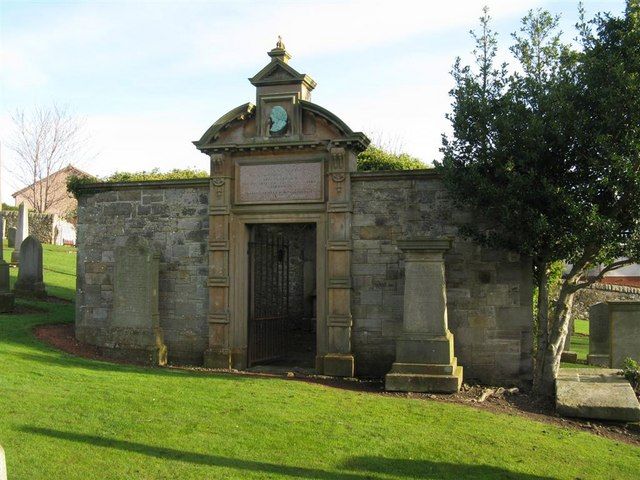
Burial sepulchre of William and Robert Cullen in Kirknewton

William Cullen FRS FRSE FRCPE (/ˈkʌlən/; 15 April 1710 – 5 February 1790) was a Scottish physician, chemist and agriculturalist from Hamilton, Scotland, who also served as a professor at the Edinburgh Medical School. Cullen was a central figure in the Scottish Enlightenment: He was David Hume's physician, and was friends with Joseph Black, Henry Home, Adam Ferguson, John Millar, and Adam Smith, among others.

He was president of the Royal College of Physicians and Surgeons of Glasgow (1746–47), president of the Royal College of Physicians of Edinburgh (1773–1775) and first physician to the king in Scotland (1773–1790). He also assisted in obtaining a royal charter for the Philosophical Society of Edinburgh, resulting in the formation of the Royal Society of Edinburgh in 1783.

Cullen was a beloved teacher, and many of his students became influential figures. He kept in contact with many of his students, including Benjamin Rush, a central figure in the founding of the United States of America; John Morgan, who founded the first medical school in the American colonies, the Medical School at the College of Philadelphia; William Withering, the discoverer of digitalis; Sir Gilbert Blane, medical reformer of the Royal Navy; and John Coakley Lettsom, the philanthropist and founder of the Medical Society of London.

Cullen's student and later rival John Brown developed the medical system known as Brunonianism, which conflicted with Cullen's. The competition between the two systems had knock-on effects in how patients were treated worldwide, especially in Italy and Germany, during the end of the eighteenth and beginning of the nineteenth century.

Cullen was also an author. He published a number of medical textbooks, mostly for the use of his students, though they were popular in Europe and the American colonies. His best known work was First Lines of the Practice of Physic, which was published in a series of editions between 1777 and 1784, and inventing the basis of modern refrigeration.

== Early life ==
Cullen was born in Hamilton. His father William was a lawyer retained by the Duke of Hamilton as factor, and his mother was Elizabeth Roberton of Whistlebury. He studied at the Old Grammar School of Hamilton (renamed in 1848 The Hamilton Academy), then, in 1726, began a General Studies arts course at the University of Glasgow. He began his medical training as apprentice to John Paisley, a Glasgow apothecary surgeon, then spent 1729 as surgeon on a merchant vessel trading between London and the Antilles in the West Indies.

After two years as assistant apothecary to Mr Murray of Henrietta Street, London, he returned to Scotland in 1732 to establish himself in general medical practice in the parish of Shotts, Lanarkshire. Also serving the town of Hamilton he had cured the Duke of Hamilton who thereafter became his patron.

From 1734 to 1736, he studied medicine at the University of Edinburgh, where he became interested in chemistry, and was one of the founders of the Royal Medical Society in his first year of study.

In 1736, he began medical practice in Hamilton, where he rapidly acquired a high reputation. He also continued his study of the natural sciences, especially of chemistry. From 1737 to 1740 William Hunter was his resident pupil, and at one time they proposed to enter into partnership. In 1740 Cullen was awarded the degree of MD from Glasgow University. In 1741, he married and started his family. He became ordinary medical attendant to James Douglas, 5th Duke of Hamilton (1703–43), his family, and his livestock. In 1744, following the Duke's death, the Cullens moved to Glasgow.

In Glasgow he gave extramural lectures for the university, on physiology, botany, materia medica, and chemistry. His great abilities, enthusiasm, and use of practical demonstrations for instruction, made him a successful and highly popular teacher, attracting large classes. At the same time he also maintained a medical practice. In 1747, Cullen was awarded Britain's first independent lectureship in Chemistry and was elected President of the Faculty of Physicians and Surgeons of Glasgow. In 1748 while in Glasgow, Cullen invented the basis for modern refrigeration, although is not credited with a usable application. In 1751 he was appointed Professor of the Practice of Medicine, although he continued to lecture on chemistry.

== Edinburgh ==
In 1755 he was enticed by Lord Kames to become Professor of Chemistry and Medicine at the University of Edinburgh in place of Prof Andrew Plummer. It was in Edinburgh, in 1756, that he gave the first documented public demonstration of artificial refrigeration. In 1748, an account had been published in The Edinburgh Physical and Literary Essays of an experiment in which Cullen used an air pump to create a partial vacuum over a container of diethyl ether, which then boiled, absorbing heat from the surroundings. This created a small amount of ice, but the process found no commercial application.

From 1757 he delivered lectures on clinical medicine in the Edinburgh Royal Infirmary. On the death of Charles Alston in 1760, Cullen at the request of the students undertook to finish his course of lectures on materia medica; he delivered an entirely new course, notes of which were published in an unauthorised edition in 1771, but which he re-wrote and issued as A Treatise on Materia Medica in 1789.

On the death of Robert Whytt, the professor of the institutes of medicine, in 1766, Cullen accepted the chair, at the same time resigning that of chemistry. In the same year, he had been an unsuccessful candidate for the professorship of the practice of physic (medicine), but subsequently an arrangement was made between him and John Gregory, the successful candidate, by which they both agreed to deliver alternate courses on the theory and practice of medicine. This arrangement continued until the sudden death of Gregory in 1773. Cullen was then appointed sole professor of the practice of physic, and he continued in this office until a few months before his death.

In Edinburgh, Cullen lived off South Grays Close on the Royal Mile close to the old Scottish mint. He had a country residence at Ormiston Hill in Kirknewton, West Lothian.

In 1783 Cullen (together with his sons) was a co-founder of the Royal Society of Edinburgh.

On 8 January 1790 he was presented with a silver platter costing 50 guineas by the Lord Provost, Thomas Elder and the city baillies, for his long service in the university.

He died in his home in the old mint in Edinburgh on 5 February 1790, but is buried in the churchyard at Kirkliston. His son Robert lies with him.

== Influence ==
Cullen taught many students who would go on to influential careers in British science. Indeed, a large number of the doctors who taught in Edinburgh's medical school from the 1790s to 1810s had studied with him, including the chemist Joseph Black, the anatomist Alexander Monro Secundus, and the naturalist John Walker. Cullen's emphasis on the practical benefits of chemistry made his ideas popular amongst farmers, industrialists, naturalists and doctors alike. His influence on these fields was felt through the writings of his students, particularly in the books of John Anderson, the 'Aberdeen Agricola', and the lectures given by Joseph Black and John Walker from the 1770s to 1790s.

By studying the symptoms of diseases, Cullen classified diseases into different classes. One class of diseases was called "neuroses."

== Medical practice ==
In the 18th century, there were three primary professions in medicine: physicians, surgeons, and apothecaries (the former name for pharmacists), although the barriers among them were starting to become blurred. William Cullen practiced as all three. Because medical practitioners were not as established as they are now, patients generally took advice from a myriad of sources, including personal experience, books, and several consultations. Furthermore, because the diagnostic tools were not as advanced, patient history was the primary and most important information for the physicians to diagnose their patients. There were no strict government regulations in place for physicians, surgeons, and apothecaries. As a result, to become successful in the medical marketplace depended more on social skills than on medical expertise, similar to other forms of businesses. Cullen was one of the more successful physicians because of his shrewdness in handling difficult patients. Teaching at the university and seeing patients at the Edinburgh Infirmary as charity also helped Cullen become more famous.

Many of Cullen's consultations were done through written letters sent by patients from Scottish cities and towns. Cullen managed his consultations with great efficiency; he usually read the letters early in the morning and his secretary-amanuensis would record and mail back his responses. He then went around Edinburgh to visit patients. This form of epistolary consultations was often limited by the literacy and socioeconomic status of the patients. Patients who would write letters to Cullen were usually in the upper and middle class. Besides letters from patients, he also consulted physicians, often students he had taught. Based on how his letters were written, Cullen was most likely a "tactful and compassionate practitioner." Like many physicians in his time, Cullen would often prescribe therapeutics "to support the patient's endangered constitution and assist the body's natural healing tendencies." This is because medical practitioners at the time mostly believed that diseases and illnesses were unique to different patients depending on their constitutions.

== Medical teaching ==
According to Rocca, Cullen was known for systemizing and promoting medical knowledge rather than producing original research. Despite the lack of original work, some believed that Cullen's attempt to organize existing knowledge was actually a sign of his "practical sagacity" as a practitioner. He was a lecturer for more than forty years. In order to understand Cullen's medical teaching at the time, it is important to understand Cullen's conception of "system" as he taught it in his classes. Cullen described a system as "an organised body of opinions on particular topics in the medical curriculum." He also referred to system as the principles in his book First Lines of the Practice of Physic. There were many possible reasons behind Cullen's emphasis of the system of medicine. In the 18th century, a period of Scottish Enlightenment, there were competing theories about the mechanisms of the human body and the causes of diseases proposed by different professors, who competed for students' teaching fees. Thus, having an underlying system of medical knowledge was a practical way to organize the knowledge coherently for the students.

Like many prominent medical figures in the 18th century, William Cullen took a great interest in the nervous system. He defined the nervous system as an "animated machine" whose main function is to "perform a variety of motions," communicate and interact with "external bodies." Cullen believed that the nervous system was composed of four elements: the medullary substance, consisting of the brain and the spinal cord, the membranous nerves, the sensory nerves, and the muscular fibers.

Cullen's understanding of the nervous system was also influenced by his contemporaries, one of whom was Albrecht von Haller (1708–1777). Haller proposed that tissues, including muscles, were characterized by "irritability" (or contractility), while nerves were characterized by "sensibility" (or feeling). Using Haller's characterization, Cullen defined disease "as an excess or deficiency of sensibility." However, Cullen interpreted sensibility as "muscle mobility and vigour" and diseases were caused by the imbalance of irritability and sensibility. Based on this definition of disease, his therapeutics "either stimulated or sedated the nervous system." He categorized diseases into four main classes: pyrexiae, neuroses, cachexiae, and locales. Within the classes were nineteen orders and 132 genera. The four orders of neuroses were comata, adynamiae, spasmi and vesaniae. Comata was defined as "a diminution of voluntary motion, with sleep, or a deprivation of the senses." Adynamiae is defined as "a diminution of the involuntary motions, whether vital or natural." Spasmi was defined as "irregular motions of the muscles or muscular fibers." Vesaniae was defined as "disorders of the judgement without any pyrexia or coma."

Cullen's emphasis on the importance of the nervous system was driven by the understanding that the nervous system controls the human body and therefore, "all diseases may, in some sense, be called affections of the nervous system, because, in almost every disease, the nerves are more or less hurt." Although Cullen's nosology did not last very long, Cullen's influential teachings on medical knowledge and his attempt to systematize and generalize medical knowledge were integral parts of 18th century Scottish Enlightenment.

== Family ==
In 1741, he married Anne (or Anna) Johnstone, who died at the mint in 1786. He was father to the judge Robert Cullen, Lord Cullen and to the physician Henry Cullen. Cullen's eldest son Robert became a Scottish judge in 1796 under the title of Lord Cullen later Baron Cullen, and was known for his powers of mimicry.

== Publications ==
Because of the wide popularity of Cullen's work, many of his publications were translated into a multitude of languages across Europe. Cullen's most popular and successful work was his medical textbook First Lines of the Practice of Physic, published in two volumes in 1777 and expanded with each edition until it reached four volumes in its final edition (1784).

His first book-length publication was Synopsis Nosologiae Methodicae (1769), Cullen's very influential nosology, or classification of diseases. His next publication was also a medical textbook, and it dealt with the Institutions of medicine, i.e. medical theory. Its full title was Institutions of Medicine. Part I. Physiology (1772) because it focused on physiology, which was traditionally only one part of the Institutions (pathology and therapeutics were also essential parts of medical theory). It went through two more editions (1777 & 1785).

Work on his magnum opus, First Lines of Practice of Physic, occupied much of his time in the 1770s and 1780s, but he did manage one final publication. This was his two volume A Treatise of the Materia Medica (1789), which was highly valued by other medical practitioners throughout Europe.

Thus, the following works, with their dates of publication (including multiple editions), comprise the majority of Cullen's oeuvre:

- Synopsis Nosologiae Methodicae (1769; 1771; 1780; 1785)
- Lectures on the Materia medica. 2nd Ed. Dublin : Whitestone, 1781. Digital edition of the University and State Library Düsseldorf.
- Cours de Matière médicale. Paris, 1788. Digital edition of the University and State Library Düsseldorf.
- Institutions of Medicine. Part I. Physiology (1772; 1777; 1785)
- First Lines of the Practice of Physic (1777; 1778; 1781; 1784; 1793 (vol. 1; vol. 2))
- A Treatise of the Materia Medica (1789)
  - Traité de Matière médicale translated by Édouard François Marie Bosquillon. Published: vol. 1 – 3. Pavie : Sauveur, 1791. Digital edition of the University and State Library Düsseldorf.
  - Trattato di Materia medica. Involved: Dalladecima, Angelo. 2. Ed. Erschienen: Bd. 1 – 6. Padova : Bettinelli, 1798. Digital edition of the University and State Library Düsseldorf.

Cullen also published a few, shorter works (e.g. "A Letter to Lord Cathcart" in 1776), which have not been included in this list.
