= Henry Cullen =

Scottish physician

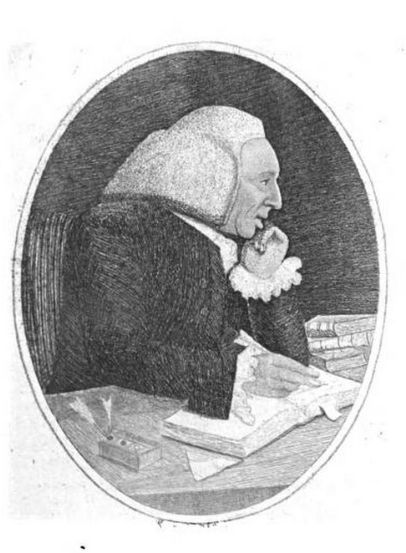
Henry Cullen by John Kay

Henry Cullen FRSE FRCPE (c.1758 – 1790) was a British physician from Edinburgh, Scotland. He was chair and professor of medicine at the Royal Infirmary of Edinburgh. From 1776 until his death in 1790 he was a physician-in-ordinary to the Royal Infirmary of Edinburgh.

== Life ==
Born in Edinburgh, the son of eminent physician and chemist William Cullen (1710-1790) and Anne Johnstone (d.1786). His older brother was the Robert Cullen, later Lord Cullen. The family lived in Mint Close on The Canongate, home of the old Scottish Mint.

He was educated at the High School in Edinburgh and then studied medicine at University of Edinburgh graduating MD in 1780.

A member of the Philosophical Society of Edinburgh when it received its royal charter, he also was a founding Fellow of the Royal Society of Edinburgh in 1783, as was his brother Robert Cullen. In 1785 he was elected a member of the Harveian Society of Edinburgh.

He died in Edinburgh on 11 October 1790 at age 32.
