= Flaminio Torrigiani =

Italian academic

Flaminio Torrigiani or Torrigiano (1729–November, 1792) was an Italian physician and anatomist.

== Career ==
Rasori was born in Corniglio. He began studying medicine in Florence, studying under Angelo Nannoni. After graduation, he became in 1768 professor of anatomy at the University of Parma. He later became professor of theoretical medicine and experimental physics. He was surgeon for the Ducal court and taught anatomy at the Accademia delle Belle Arti in Parma. Among his publications, are:

- Lessons of Physiology and Pathology
- Lessons of Anatomy
- Lessons of Experimental Physics
- Segni da' quali si potra facilmente conoscere la malattia che serpeggia nelle bestie bovine (1771 Parma)
- Trattato dell flogosi
- Poesia varie

In Parma, he was a teacher of the physician Giovanni Rasori and GAD Tommasini.
