= The Murder of Caesar (Piloty) =

1865 painting by Karl von Piloty

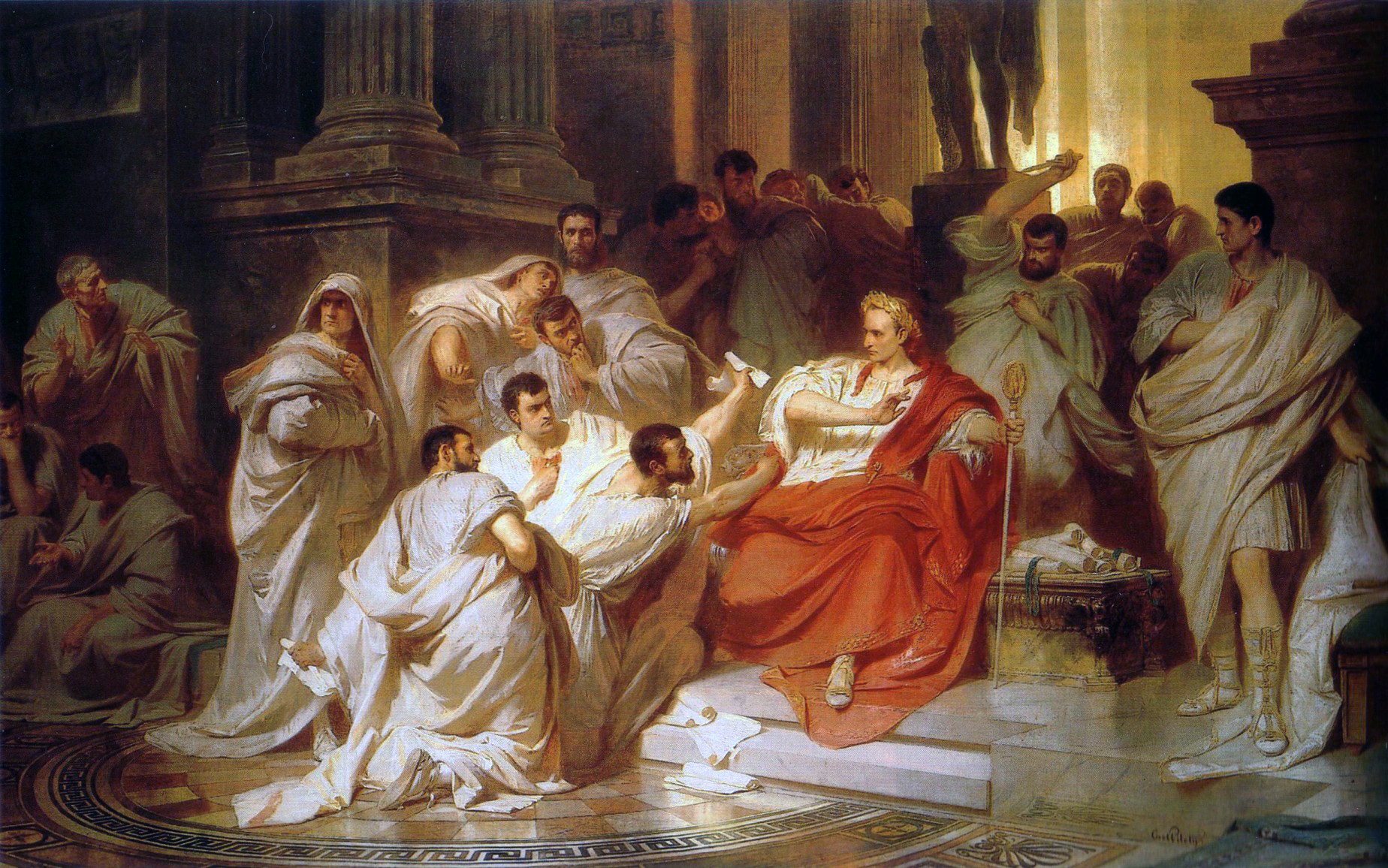
- Artist: Karl von Piloty
- Year: 1865

The Murder of Caesar is an oil on canvas painting by German artist Karl von Piloty, from 1865, which depicts the assassination of Julius Caesar. Its dimensions are 149 by 238 cm. It is held in the Landesmuseum Hannover.

== Description ==
The painting positions Caesar seated, crowned, and robed in a scarlet toga, as the centre and focus of composition. Tillius Cimber is depicted pulling on Caesar's toga to both distract and pin him, as Servilius Casca sneaks behind Caesar and attempts to stab him with a dagger.

== Reception ==
The Contemporary Review described the paintings as "a highly realistic, dramatic, not to say sporadic, composition". "Pitloy paints for effect, his art indeed would be artificial were it not empathetically real. The perfecting of a sensational style has been with him for a life study." The Art Journal stated that it was "truly a great work".

The painting was used for the cover of the novel The Throne of Caesar by Steven Saylor (Minotaur Books, New York 2018).
