= Andreas Röschlaub =

German physician (1768–1835)

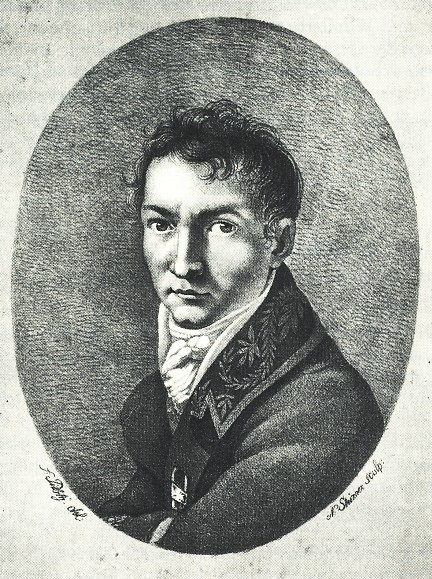
Lithograph portrait of Andreas Röschlaub by Ferdinand Piloty

Andreas Röschlaub (21 October 1768 – 7 July 1835) was a German medical doctor born in Lichtenfels, Bavaria.

He studied medicine at the University of Würzburg and the University of Bamberg, obtaining his doctorate at the latter institution in 1795. In 1798, he became a full professor of pathology at the University of Bamberg, and transferred in 1802 to the Ludwig-Maximilians-Universität in Landshut, where he was director of the medical school. In 1826, he relocated with the university (now Ludwig-Maximilians-Universität München) to Munich as a professor of medicine.

He was editor of Magazin zur Vervollkommnung der theoretischen und praktischen Heilkunde ("Magazine for the Perfection of Theoretical and Practical Medicine"), and the author of a textbook on classification of diseases titled Lehrbuch der Nosologie.

Röschlaub is remembered for development of the Erregbarkeitstheorie (excitability theory), which was a modification of Brownianism, a speculative theory of medicine that was initially formulated by Scottish physician John Brown (1735–1788).

== Role in German Romantic medicine ==
Until recently, the history of German medicine, particularly of Romantic medicine, had essentially denigrated, then largely forgotten, the contributions of the physician Andreas Röschlaub of Bamberg, a process that one reviewer terms "a curious combination of obscurity and notoriety." (Nigel Reeves) However, a major revision of his place in German and European medicine, in particular Romantic medicine and the advancement of the Brunonian system, by N. Tsouyopoulos, has come to the conclusion that he "was one of the most well-known, controversial and influential personalities of his time." His writings were extensive and influential as regards the problem of the reform of medicine and its placing on a sound scientific footing, and it was these writings that framed much of the debate in Germany at the time. Important figures of the time, such as Schelling and Hufeland undertook trips to Bamberg to meet him and seek his views. As one contemporary historian wrote "even public teachers and not insignificant figures wrote textbooks in which almost every paragraph begins with 'Röschlaub teaches' " .

The main reason for the neglect of Röschlaub's place in history is likely his acceptance of the ideas of Dr. John Brown while a medical student and their enthusiastic promotion, including making it the basis of a doctoral dissertation. He then further advanced Brown's ideas on graduation, making Germany the main centre for the implementation of the Brunonian system of medicine. Brown's ideas had been known in Germany some 10 years after the publication of Elementa Medicinae in 1780, when Dr. Christoph Girtanner, a well-known physician in Göttingen, wrote a paper in a French journal on Brunonianism without attributing the ideas to Brown, creating a minor scandal. Subsequently, a medical student at the university of Bamberg sent a copy of Brown's text to Professor Adam M. Weikard (1742-1803), who was sufficiently impressed to arrange the first German printing in 1794, and then to follow this with the publication the following year of his translation into German (Johann Brown's Grundsätze der Arzneilehre aus dem Lateinischen übersetzt, Frankfurt). Then in 1796 a second translation, by Christoff Pfaff, was made available.

Röschlaub made his own translation, but did not publish it until 1806-7 (in three volumes as John Brown's sämtliche Werke) out of consideration for Weikard. Meanwhile, Röschlaub worked closely on his graduation with Adalbert Marcus, the director of the famous hospital in Bamberg, to work out the implementation of the Brunonian system and were ready to publish the results in 1797. The main work was Röschlaub's Untersuchungen über Pathogenie oder Einleitung in die Heilkunde, 3 vols. Frankfurt, 1798-1800. The work and writings that came out of the Bamberg clinic made the town a famous, intellectual and medical centre."

=== Collaboration with Schelling ===
In 1799 Röschlaub created a journal, the Magazin der Vervollkommung der theoretischen und praktischen Heilkunde, published eventually in 10 volumes between 1799 and 1809. In the first volume, the famous natural philosopher, Schelling, wrote an article replying to a critical review of Brunonian literature in the renowned Allgemeine Literatur Zeitung earlier that year. While Schelling had been initially critical of Brown's work (Weltseele, 1798), seeing in it but a mechanical approach, his contact with Röschlaub allowed him to appreciate the dynamic, vital nature of Brown's approach as he expressed in his The first outline of a system of a philosophy of nature (1799). Schelling's embracing of Brown's ideas led to a close collaboration with Röschlaub and a visit to Bamberg in 1800. Schelling's main contribution to the theory of excitability was to explain that there was a receptive and active antithetical function, which involved the generative power (Blumenbach's Bildungstrieb and Dr, Samuel Hahnemann's Lebenserzeugungskraft). Schelling held that each organism needs a 'special rhythm' and that this was a function of a certain degree of receptivity and activity, deviation from which meant disorder "because it disturbs the rhythm of self-reproduction and finally influences the reproduction process itself, thus causing not only quantitative but also qualitative changes in the organism."

The nature of Schelling's influence in German culture was such as to further promote the Brunonian system, as presented by Röschlaub. "It was Röschlaub's explanation which made Brown's principle [of life as a 'forced state'] acceptable" to the German mind which had a more dynamic conception of life. Röschlaub helped to bring out the dynamic interplay between the outer stimulant ('excitant') and the inner life potential (excitability) resulting in the activity known as life (biological excitation). The organism possesses an intrinsic receptive activity to be acted upon but also a proactive ability to respond. Röschlaub also refined Brown's idea that disorders resulted from an excess (hypersthenia) or deficit (hyposthenia) of stimuli by adding that this involved a disporoportion between the receptive and pro-active sides of excitability.

=== Role of Physiology ===
Röschlaub's work also allowed him to tie Brown's elements of a system of medicine to the emerging idea that physiology was the key to a scientific medicine. In this regard, Brown's central idea that pathology was simply a sub-set of physiology, a stretching of normal healthy dynamic rhythms or functions beyond a certain supportable degree, was central to then allowing German medicine to consider that "pathology, nosology and clinical practice could be linked to physiology" which seemed the way to establish a solid foundation for medicine in natural science.

Scientific physiology was a part of medical education in Germany…but they could not see how they could use these basic sciences in the treatment of diseases.

Medicine, for Röschlaub, becomes a science only when a true scientific physiology exists. "Only then will medicine be possible as a true 'art' when organismic physiology becomes a truly perfected science." (1801) This meant that physiology had to take into account a life principle (Lebensprinzip) that organized matter, but was not dependent on matter. While Röschlaub worked with Johann Christian Reil's general conception of physiology, which accepted that physiology was a product of natural forces, but tended to see these in chemical terms uniquely.

Röschlaub's explanation of excitability (Erregbarkeit) as a dynamic, polarity between two antithetical functions - receptivity and pro-activity - made Brown's principle acceptable and also verifiable "and as such applicable to practical medical diagnosis and therapy." His continued work, while it led to some differences with Schelling, further elaborated the Brunonian system, but Röschlaub eventually came to realize that it could not be taken further without a more overarching theory for excitation itself and the understanding of life energy [Nelly article p. 72] (which would eventually emerge in the work of Wilhelm Reich on orgone energy).

=== Debate on Human Nature ===
The Enlightenment view of human nature was an essentially static one (the unique individual who could be perfected according to reason), that of Romantic medicine dynamic (man was unique, but also evolving). While the idea of the mutability of human nature had emerged in the 1700s, it took root in the "dynamization and historification of consciousness through German philosophy."

German philosophy had an emerging view of life and consciousness as activity and action, such as expressed by Fichte: "The only Being is Life. And the modes of action are the only reality of the I." which Röschlaub often quoted, and which idea he expressed himself: "If we call the efficacy of living actions 'Life', then we must say by way of epitomizing this that all these bodies live." (1800) Out of this conception came the possibility of a new presentation of the relation between subject (I, consciousness-organism) and object (outer world, nature). The outer world wins for the first time a fundamental significance for the 'subject'; it can be seen as the ground of consciousness and life; it conditions namely the mode of the subject without annulling it; it is the stimulus of activity which modulates the subject, a view that was strikingly close to that held by John Brown, but which could not be perceived except in the more dynamic context of German Romantic medicine.

The healthcare implications were that a dynamic view considered therapeutic measures affecting the interior milieu important considerations for the physician.Röschlaub entered the debate on this issue arguing for the role of the physician in "social medicine" or hygiene, and the importance of hygiene itself to a scientific medicine, a position that was largely taken up later by Virchow, whose views on this in 1849 could have been word-for-word those of Röschlaub.

If medicine is to really fulfill its great task, then it must intervene in political and social life at large; it must list the hindrances which stand in the way of the normal fulfillment of the life processes, and work to eliminate them. Should that ever be achieved, then will medicine be as it ought to be – a common property for all. It will then cease to be medicine and will merge into the general, unified body of scientific knowledge which is synonymous with 'know-how'.

However, where Virchow only saw hygiene as a prophylactic measure (negative role), Röschlaub also advocated a positive role, that is, the use of remedial measures to promote health. This was an idea that was largely forgotten until revived by Hans Buchner in 1896 in a lecture on Biology and Health Doctrine, which caused quite a stir in German medical circles, but which also raises the question as to the goal of therapy, a question answered several decades later by the work of Wilhelm Reich and his function of the orgasm (special theory) and the more overarching theory of 'super-imposition.'

=== Influence ===
It was thanks to Röschlaub's interpretation, promotion and elaboration of Brown's new approach to medicine that it came to influence German medicine, and became the core aspect of German Romantic medicine. As the major historian of Röschlaub's contribution states, German medicine was shifted from the mechanism of the 1700s to a more dynamic conception of life and illness.

The idea of an active, self-reproducing and self-defending power mediating the organism's general reaction has, since then, never ceased to resonate in German medical thinking."

Röschlaub strove to unify surgery and medicine, and to place Healthcare on a natural scientific basis whilst also recognizing the need for special methods in approaching clinical practice that went beyond the natural sciences, but also went beyond the purely speculative symptomatic prescribing of traditional medicine (semiotics).

The thought that medicine as a unitary natural science could only be realized by a transformation of the semiotic clinic into a treatment center was what was truly innovative in Röschlaub's conception.

Röschlaub's championing of the new views of man and environment from Fichte and Schelling, stemming from Locke, and integrating these into the Brunonian system provided a scientific basis for considering Healthcare, one that continues to find echoes in medicine, such as expressed half a century later in the works of Claude Bernard. The new conception of man, as being acted upon by and acting in response to the world around him to create an individual ambient that was distinct from the environment more generally, is one that has persisted in medicine, particularly in various physicians concerned with hygiene, and the interaction of the organism and its environment, such as in the field of clinical ecology or 'environmental' medicine. As Röschlaub himself wrote quite presciently,

A body can only be an organic individual, and assert itself as such, in that it tears itself away from organic nature by dint of its own activity and self-efficacy. But this activity would expire were it not for an activity that deals with objects. The body must therefore be exposed to external objects and possess receptivity for them. And thus the activity determines the receptivity and is in turn determined by it." (1800)

== Works ==
- Untersuchungen über die Pathogenie oder Einleitung in die medicinische Theorie, Frankfurt am Main, 1798
- Von dem Einflusse der Brown’schen Theorie auf die praktische Heilkunde, Würzburg 1798
- Lehrbuch der Nosologie, Bamberg/Würzburg 1801
- Über Medizin, ihr Verhältnis zur Chirurgie, nebst Materialien zu einem Entwurfe der Polizei der Medizin, Frankfurt am Main 1802
- Lehrbuch der besonderen Nosologie, Jatreusiologie und Jatrie, Frankfurt am Main, 1807–1810
- Philosophische Werke. Bd. 1: Über die Würde und das Wachstum der Wissenschaften und Künste und ihre Einführung in das Leben, Sulzbach 1827
- Magazin zur Vervollkommnung der theorethsichen und praktischen Heilkunde 1799-1809

== Bibliography ==
- Andreas Röschlaub und die Romantische Medizin: Die philosophische Grundlagen der modernen Medizin by Nelly Tsouyopoulos (Stuttgart: Gustav Fischer Verlag, 1982)
