= Bernhard Hirschel =

German physician, writer and liberal activist

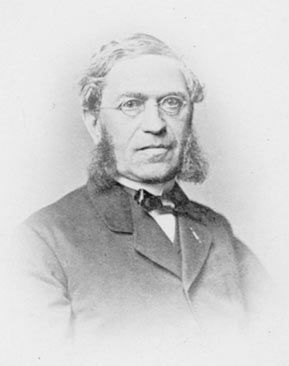
- Born: Bernhard Baruch Hirschel; 15 January 1815; Dresden, Saxony
- Died: 15 January 1874 (aged 59); Dresden, Saxony, Germany
- Education: Leipzig University
- Occupations: Physician; Writer; Liberal activist
- Spouse: Cäcilie née Levi (1825-1883)
- Children: Bella Hedwig 1844; Wilhelm 1847; Arthur 1850; Anna 1855; Maria Theresia 1859
- Parent(s): Abraham Hirschel (1787–1830); Bella Hirschel (1794-1845)

Bernhard Hirschel (15 January 1815 – 15 January 1874) was a German medical doctor, writer and liberal activist who lived and worked in Dresden. He became a pioneer of Homeopathy.

== Life ==
=== Provenance and boyhood ===
Bernhard Baruch Hirschel was born in Dresden. His father, Abraham Hirschel (1787–1830), was a clothes retailer. His mother, Bella (1794-1845), also worked in the clothing trade. From the age of four Berhard attended the Cheder (Jewish junior school) where he was able to learn Hebrew. He would later recall this period as "not particularly nice" ("nicht besonders schön"), complaining about the untutored fellow students, bad teachers and inadequate lessons. From 1823 he was tutored by Marcus David Landau, a private tutor who was also a cantor in the Dresden synagogue. Hirschel believed that this was his first experience of a valid spiritual education. With fellow pupils who included Jacob Nachod - later notable as a Leipzig merchant and philanthropist - he received an academic grounding in Geography, History and Mathematics. At Easter 1825 he switched to Dresden's prestigious School of the Cross, having previously, at his mother's instigation, taken private tuition in Latin and Greek. His time at the school left him with good memories. Teachers and others at the institution treated him with fairness, but attending a Christian school exposed him to hostility from members of the Jewish community. He was an industrious pupil and passed the school leaving exam (Abitur) in 1832, which opened the way to university level education.

=== University ===
In order to save money he now embarked on a study course at the Royal Saxon Medical-Surgical Academy ("Königlich Chirurgisch-Medicinische Akademie") in Dresden, housed in the de:Kurländer PalaisKurländer Palais building. However, at this time the institution was not authorised to issue academic degrees, and in 1834 he moved on to Leipzig University where he studied and received his doctorate medicine. This involved leaving his parents' home. According to one source, the scholarship to which his parents' limited financial means would otherwise have entitled him was not available to Hirschel because he was Jewish. His studies at Leipzig were in large measure funded by the Dresden-based Mendelssohn Foundation.

=== Physician and author ===
In 1838 he returned to Dresden, where he worked as a physician till he died. His studies concluded, he also embarked on a career as a writer, primarily at this stage focusing on medical history. His first publications date from 1839, and deal with Medical Societies and Hydrotherapy. He also wrote reviews on French news publications, covering a wide range of medical themes. In 1840 his first major publication appeared, returning to the subject of Hydrotherapy, a theme in which he would involve himself for the rest of his life. In 1843 the first volume of his ambitious work on medical history, "Steps in the Development of the History of Medicine" ("Geschichte der Medicin in den Grundzügen ihrer Entwickelung") appeared followed in 1846 by his long planned first volume of "The History of Medical Schools and the Nineteenth Century Systems in Monographs" (Die "Geschichte der medicinischen Schulen und Systeme des neunzehnten Jahrhunderts in Monographien"). In addition, from about 1843/44, after five or so years after he started work as a physician, his interest in Homeopathy began to develop. Along with his other responsibilities, between 1846 and 1849 he held the post of deputy coroner for the central part of Dresden. In the years since his return from Leipzig, Hirschel had by this stage become highly respected as a physician.

=== Marriage and politics ===
It was in part a measure of his professional success that in 1844 Bernhard Hirschel married Cäcilie Levi, who came from one of Dresden's leading commercial families. The marriage would produce five recorded children.

During the later 1840s there were no more books on medical matters, however, reflecting Hirschel's growing political preoccupations. With Chancellor Metternich in Vienna over 70, and a less reactionary king in Berlin since 1840, there was a growing belief that winds of change were in the air. In the context of Saxon politics, Hirschel was a strong advocate for the evolving liberal agenda. In 1846 he published "An Evaluation of Saxony's Government and its People" ("Sachsens Regierung, Stände und Volk"), which provides valuable and unusual insights with its analysis of the various political groupings in the Saxon legislature ("Landtag"). The work also sets out the conditions under which the press was operating in pre-1848 Saxony and complains, in particular, about the repression of magazines. When it appeared the volume was published anonymously because the author feared punishment for publishing criticism of the political situation in Saxony Furthermore, it was published not within Saxony, where press censorship was in force, but in Mannheim. It was only in 1849, three years later, that Hirschel acknowledged his authorship, writing in another book, "Saxony's recent past: A contribution to the assessment of the present" ("Sachsens jüngste Vergangenheit: Ein Beitrag zur Beurtheilung der Gegenwart"). He also now took the opportunity to characterise the March uprisings as the "glorious rising of the German people", thereby aligning himself unambiguously with the liberal revolutionaries. His position was also clear from his political activism during the period of the uprising.

In 1848 Hirschel joined the "Dresden Patriotic Union" ("Dresdner Vaterlandsverein"), becoming one of the committee's leaders. In 1849, following changes that allowed Jews equal legal status with Christians, he was elected Dresden's first Jewish city councillor.

On 9 May 1849 Hirschel was arrested in connection with the May Uprising and spent two and a half months in detention. Prescise details of his involvement are unclear, but there is reason to believe that he was not himself a participant in street fighting, but was arrested for applying his medical skills to treating wounded protesters. While he was in detention Hirschel wrote his "Prisoner's Diary" ("Tagebuch eines Gefangenen"), describing his incarceration as very depressing. He seems to have been ill at this time, and repeatedly stated his intention to withdraw from all political activities.

=== After politics ===
Bemoaning the way that when, during the revolutionary uprising, decisive moments had arrived, he had not been in a position to play a public role, he does indeed appear to have retreated into private life. He was released on 25 July 1849, but was required to pay a surety. On his release he also resigned from his senior post within the Jewish community. From 1850 there is no indication in available sources of any further political activism by Hirschel.

=== Medicine and proselatising for homeopathy ===
He now again devoted himself fully to his work as a physician, now completely integrating Homeopathy into it. In 1851 he published his first written contribution on the subject, and in October of the same year founded the "Journal for Homeopathic Clinical Therapy" ("Zeitschrift für homöopathische Klinik"), which was renamed in 1856 as the "New Journal for Homeopathic Clinical Therapy" ("Neue Zeitschrift für homöopathische Klinik"). Hirschel was the journal's publisher till his death. In 1858 circulation reached 7,000 copies. Readers included the Queen of Spain as well as the King and Queen of Hannover.

1856 saw the publication of what was probably his best known book, "The Homeopathic Doctor's Treasure chest and its Uses at the Sickbed" ("Der homöopathische Arzneischatz in seiner Anwendung am Krankenbette"). By 1874 the book had appeared in 17 editions, and it was translated from German into several languages including Spanish, French and Danish. In this way Hirschel became internationally respected as an expert on Homeopathy. In 1867 at Vienna he was elected vice chairman of the International Homeopathy Congress. During the next few years he published extensively on the subject, often becoming embroiled in controversy because of the passionate nature of his advocacy. The effectiveness of the homeopathic approach was not universally accepted by the medical establishment, but despite this during the second half of the nineteenth century it was rapidly gaining supporters across the world. That is partly because, despite great progress in diagnosis and treatment, doctors were all too often powerless to provide effective treatments using mainstream methods. Bernhard Herschel proved a case in point: on his fifty-ninth birthday neither "conventional treatments" nor Homeopathy were able to prevent his death from Peritonitis.

=== Beyond professional life ===
Alongside his professional and literary work, throughout his entire life Hirschel contributed actively in the Jewish community. After his withdrawal from politics in the wake of the March uprisings he became a teacher at the Dresden synagogue, supported various zionist associations and for several years was an elder of the community. He also organised financial support for the widows of deceased colleagues. In obituaries of the time he was frequently commended for his tireless commitment to his patients: he clearly inspired affection.
