= Brunonian system of medicine =

The Brunonian system of medicine (Brunonianism) is a theory of medicine which regards and treats disorders as caused by defective or excessive excitation with respect to physiology. It was developed by the Scottish physician John Brown and is outlined in his 1780 publication Elementa Medicinae. It drew on the theories of his teacher William Cullen, but whereas Cullen set out to create a systematic nosology of diseases, Brown argued for a unified model in which all disease was related to stimulation. The system was based on, according to the 1791 book Heirs of Hippocrates as a system "based on the principle that life is maintained by a state of externally provoked excitability within living tissues".

Although Brown's theory never became very popular in Britain, it had temporary success in America, Italy, and the German-speaking part of Europe.

== Life of John Brown ==
John Brown was born in 1735 and died in 1788, not very long after having written his master work, Elementa Medicinae (Elements of Medicine) in 1780. He was apparently studied to be a clergyman, but then studied medicine at Edinburgh University, and received his degree at St Andrew's. He commenced his medical practice in Edinburgh, but opposition to his new ideas, as set out in his Elementa Medicinae resulted in his move to London in 1786.

Brown worked with and studied under one of the foremost medical practitioners and theoreticians of the time, William Cullen. Cullen and Brown, however, had a falling out. Brown was likely influenced by Cullen's ideas on the capacity for nerves and muscles to be excited or stimulated (similar to the work of Haller in Germany on 'irritability'), but Brown looked at the issue of excitation in a broader and more dynamic manner. One scholarly article relates the influence of Galvanism and Mesmerism on Brown's work. Brown himself relates in the Introduction to his magnum opus, Elementa Medicinae, that his ideas came from an attack of gout, but in a period when his dietary intake was less rather than more. Since the cause of gout was then held to be a problem of excess, he was put on a strict vegetable diet with no wine or alcohol for a year, but instead of the promised cure, he had four "exceedingly violent" episodes. This led him to consider the effects of different foods and drinks and try a different approach, that of an invigorating or stimulating diet which proved successful. According to the Encyclopædia Perthensis, "Thus, from personal experience of the inefficacy of the former medical practice in the gout, he was led to review the whole old system of medicine."

== Elementa Medicinae and Coleridge/Beddoes ==
Brown's Elementa Medicinae was published in 1780 and followed several years later by Brown's own version in English. Brown did not live to see his work achieve any great acceptance, but in 1795, Dr. Thomas Beddoes, one of the leading physicians of his day, undertook a translation (claiming Brown's was deficient), accompanied by an extensive introduction to explain Brown's system. Beddoes was also a close friend of Samuel Taylor Coleridge, and did much to introduce him to Brown's ideas as well as to the various German writings on the Brunonian system, which appeared suddenly after 1795 as well, mainly through the writings of Dr. Andreas Röschlaub. One source states that Beddoes' influence was "the most likely source" of Coleridge's plan to go to Germany, and that Coleridge's philosophical interests there were often "anchored in medical debates." (Coleridge, Thomas Beddoes and Brunonian Medicine), Coleridge several times refers to Brown as a genius.

In a letter to the publishers Taylor and Hessey, of 1819, Coleridge ranked Brown alongside Cicero, Luther, Giordano Bruno, Milton, Dryden, Wolfe, Hunter and Wordsworth, as a 'man of great Genius and original Mind' (Collected Letters 4:938). Although he no longer appears in such distinguished company, during the 1790s, Brown's adherents included Immanuel Kant, J. G. Fichte and Friedrich von Schelling and, among Coleridge's immediate circle Erasmus Darwin, James Mackintosh, John Thelwall and Beddoes. This neglected strand of radical British thought from the 1780s and '90s was to play a great part in Coleridge's espousal of German Idealist philosophy."

Coleridge then discusses the Brunonian system in lengthy notebook entries from his time in Göttingen.

== Brown's ideas in Germany ==
While Brown's Elementa Medicinae had been known in Germany, it was not made available until 1794, when Adam Melchor Weikard, former physician to Catherine the Great of Russia, arranged for its publication in Latin after having had it brought to his attention by Andreas Röschlaub, a medical student (who was himself given a copy in 1793 by a friend). In 1795, Weikard prepared and published a German translation. In 1796, a second German translation, by Christoff Pfaff, appeared and a second edition in 1798 came with a critical review. Röschlaub had also made a translation, but did not publish (in three volumes) until Weikard's second edition went out of print in 1806 which became the standard and last German edition (the year of Hahnemann's pivotal essay on the 'elements' of his new system, On A New Principle for Ascertaining the Curative Power of Drugs). The introduction of Brown's ideas occurred within a background both of profound natural philosophic turmoil as well as a crisis within German (and generally European) medicine (see Romantic medicine).

Inspired by Kant's critical philosophy, Fichte and Schelling were beginning to describe the relation between self and nature in new ways [although] Kant was famously ambivalent about how much we can legitimately say about the external world. He repeatedly claimed that we can have knowledge of appearances only.

At the turn of the nineteenth century Brown's work suddenly gained rapid popularity in Germany and Austria, essentially through the efforts of Andreas Röschlaub, and Adalbert Marcus, who ran the hospital in Bamberg in northern Bavaria and worked with Röschlaub to implement Brown's approach clinically. Röschlaub developed an Erregbarkeitstheorie (excitability theory) essentially on Brunonian principles. Röschlaub showed that Brunonian 'excitability' was different in kind to Haller's more mechanical theory of 'Reiz' (irritability'), which was quite well-known. The difference was that Brown posited an internal excitability which is actualised by the reception of stimuli; the response to stimuli was, therefore, the combined product of the exciting stimuli and the internal excitability. Stimulation does not only come from the outside, but also triggers from within the powers of internal excitability.

The emergence of Fichte's philosophy in 1794 provided another context for the reception of Brown's ideas. 'Fichte's Wissenschaftlehre is the theory of excitability', wrote Novalis, excitedly (Werke 3: 383). Fichte's account of the relationship between the 'I' and the 'not-I' found its biological correlate in the relationship between the organism and its environment.

Schelling too came under Brown's influence, and saw in Brunonian medicine the domain in contemporary science which was most suitable to the development of Naturphilosophie.

However, Schelling had initially misunderstood Brown's system as mechanical, but it was Röschlaub who helped him to see its dynamic aspects and applicability within a science of nature (Naturphilosophie). Schelling wrote in his First Outline of a System of a Philosophy of Nature (Naturphilosophie) in 1799 that Brown was "the first to understand the only true and genuine principles of all theories of organic nature, insofar as he pointed the ground of life in excitability...He was the first who understood that life consists neither in an absolute passivity nor in an absolute capacity, that life is a product of a potency higher than the merely chemical, but without being supernatural." (Schelling 1799:68)

As the main historian of this period in medicine and particularly of Röschlaub's role, wrote: "This new combination of Brown and Röschlaub's excitability theory with Schelling's Naturphilosophie met an enthusiastic receptionand was very influential not only at the German universities but also on practical medicine."

Another important element was the crisis in German medicine, which came to a head in an article in a public journal by a Doctor Erhard which effectively stripped all pretense of efficacy or rationality from the prevailing 'system' of medicine.

== Röschlaub and the Brunonian system in Germany ==
It was the combination of a receptive natural philosophy and science in Germany towards the end of the 1700s and the deep crisis in German medicine that provided fertile ground for the reception and dissemination of Brown's excitation theory. Röschlaub's main work on the Brunonian system, the Untersuchungen, setting out his and Marcus' experience, came out in 1798 and went out of print quickly, leading to a second edition in 1800. This led to the transformation suddenly of Bamberg "into an excellent and famous intellectual and medical centre to which students came from as far as America." Röschlaub wrote extensively on Brown's system, in particular a journal, known popularly as "Röschlaub's Magazine" (Magazin der Vervolkommung der theoretishcen und praktischen Heilkunde, Frankfurt, 10 vols. 1799–1809) "the main forum of Brunonian medicine."

Brown's ideas, as presented and developed by Röschlaub (and Markus) met with strong resistance in some quarters. As William Osler, the renowned Canadian-born physician wrote at the turn of the 20th century:

Few systems of healthcare have ever stirred such bitter controversy, particularly on the Continent, and in Charles Creighton's account of Brown we read that as late as 1802 the University of Göttingen was so convulsed by controversies as to the merits of the Brunonian system that contending factions of students in enormous numbers, not unaided by the professors, met in combat in the streets on two consecutive days and had to be dispersed by a troop of Hanoverian horse.

One of the most prominent physicians at the time, Christoph W. Hufeland (1762–1836) was initially also opposed as it seemed to convert the basis of traditional medicine, which he favoured, but later worked to show how Brunonianism and the excitability theory were compatible and even allowed proponents of Brunonianism to publish after 1816 in his influential Journal, himself contributing articles in 1819, 1822, and 1829, now comparing Brown with Galen.

=== Repression ===
There was a renewal at this time of interest in the Brunonian system due to the popularity of the French physician Broussais, whose theory was ostensibly based on Brown's system, but rather emphasized the negative side (lowering of energy through blood-letting). However, this renewal was cut short by the assassination on 23 March 1819 of August von Kotzebue, a major literary and conservative political figure, by a radical student. The result was the shutting down by Metternich of all liberal journals, schools and student unions: "for medicine, this meant a general return to traditionalism and eclecticism."

The 1840s saw a reaction to this repression and an attack on "intellectual barren medical eclecticism" with a call for a return to the ideas of Romantic medicine. Carl Wunderlich, the founder of thermometry in Germany, saw Brown and Röschlaub as the genesis of the new "physiological medicine" school of which he was a proponent. In 1846, a German doctor and historian, Bernard Hirschel, published a very favourable study of Brunonianism and listed all the relevant literature, "which remains the best compilation on this subject" Historiography misrepresented, then denounced, and finally totally ignored Röschlaub.

== Influence on Western medicine ==
Current science-based Western medical practice does not accept nineteenth century notions of "excitability".

Although the direct influence of the Brunonian system seemed to end about the mid-1800s its influence, in the form of "the idea of an active, self-reproducing and self-defending power mediating the organism's general reaction has, since then, never ceased to resonate in German medical thinking. This can be seen in Rudolf Virchow, especially when he was trying to formulate the general principles of cellular pathology." Though Virchow tried to downplay it, his approach and ideas owed much to Röschlaub's work with Brown's ideas.

One of Brown's key ideas was that of the unity of pathology and physiology, the former being an unhealthy departure from the natural rhythms and functions of the latter. This was a major idea taken over by Virchow, but he claimed it as new (the degree to which Virchow borrowed from the Brunonian system through the works of Röschlaub is documented in the major work by Nelly Tsouyoupoulos, which is available only in German).

== See also ==
- François-Joseph-Victor Broussais
