= Robert Cullen, Lord Cullen =

Scottish judge

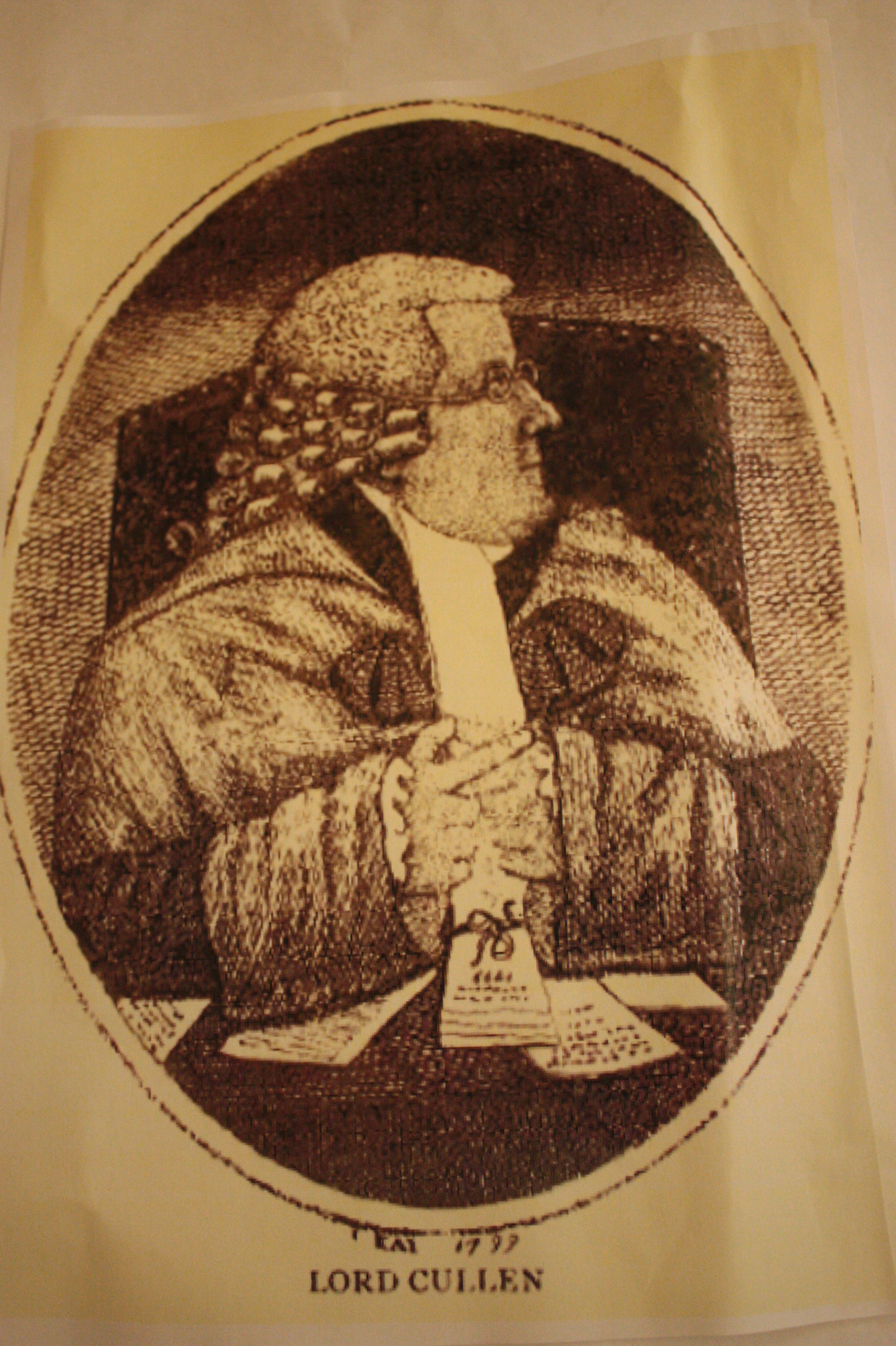
Robert Cullen, Lord Cullen as caricatured by John Kay, 1799

Robert Cullen, Lord Cullen FRSE (22 September 1742 – 28 November 1810) was a British judge from Hamilton, Scotland. Friends knew him as Bob Cullen. He played a key role, along with his father William Cullen, in obtaining a royal charter for the Philosophical Society of Edinburgh, resulting in the formation of the Royal Society of Edinburgh in 1783.

== Life ==
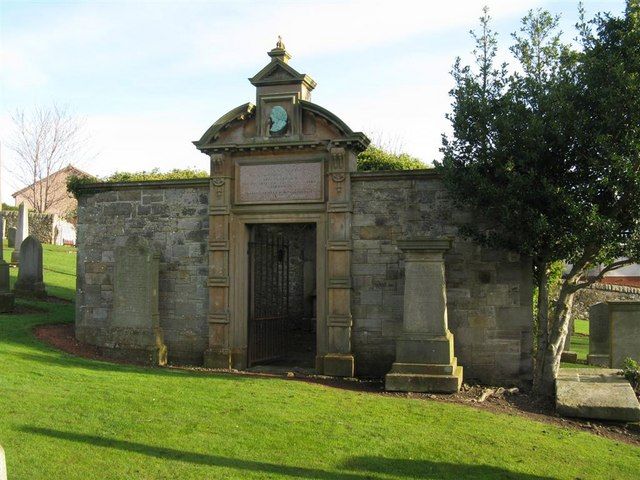
Burial enclosure of William and Robert Cullen, Kirknewton

Born on 22 September 1742 in Hamilton, the son of Anne Johnstone (d.1786) and eminent physician and chemist William Cullen, the family moved to live in the old mint in Edinburgh when his father received a position at the University of Edinburgh. His brother was the physician Henry Cullen. The family lived at South Grays Close on the Canongate, home of the old Scottish Mint.

Robert was educated at the High School and then the University of Edinburgh. He was admitted to the Faculty of Advocates in December 1764, and served as a Senator of the College of Justice (1796-9) in place of James Erskine, Lord Alva, and as Lord of Justiciary (1799–1810) in place of Lord Swinton.

In 1783 he was a joint founder of the Royal Society of Edinburgh.

He lived his final years at Argyll Square in south Edinburgh and died on 28 November 1810 and was buried alongside his father in Kirknewton churchyard, south-west of Edinburgh.

== Family ==
In later life he was married to Mary Russell, one of his servants. They had no children. She remarried after Cullen's death and died in the West Indies in 1818.

== Literary works ==
Cullen contributed to both the "Mirror" and "Lounger" magazines.
