= Ex juvantibus =

Medical investigation terminology

The term ex juvantibus or sometimes "ex adiuvantibus" (from Latin, meaning "from that which helps") refers, in medical contexts, to the process of making an inference about disease causation from an observed response of the disease to a treatment.

For example, taking the case of a patient whose headache had been alleviated by taking aspirin, an ex juvantibus line of reasoning would state that the headaches were caused by low levels of aspirin in the brain. Obviously, the fact that aspirin cures headaches does not prove that headaches are caused by the absence of aspirin. In "The 21st-Century Brain" (2006), Steven Rose applies the term to the use of psychoactive drugs to "cure" depression, implying that the underlying cause of depression is not simply low levels of certain chemicals in the brain (such as serotonin) that these drugs treat.

The phrase does not necessarily connote a fallacy. For example, a patient presents with retrosternal pain which is not relieved by sublingual nitrates (a standard remedy for angina pectoris) but is relieved with antacids (a standard remedy for heartburn). In such a case, a physician may hypothesize ex juvantibus what the underlying problem may or may not be, until a definitive diagnosis is established.
