= Ferdinand Piloty =

German lithographer (1786–1844)

Ferdinand von Piloty II (28 August 1786 – 8 January 1844) was a German lithographer. He was the father of artist Karl von Piloty.

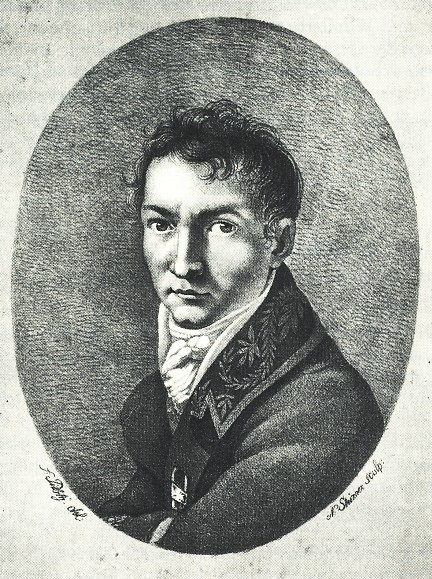
Portrait of physician Andreas Röschlaub by Piloty

== Early life and works ==
Piloty was born in Homburg. He initially studied painting, but his interests soon switched to lithography. From 1808 to 1815, with Johann Nepomuk Strixner (1782–1855), he produced a series of 423 lithographs, titled Les oeuvres lithographiques par Strixner, Piloty et Comp.

From 1836, with Joseph Löhle (1807–1840), he produced a series of copies from the Alte Pinakothek and the Schleissheim Gallery. Following the death of Gottlieb Bodmer in 1837, Piloty and Löhle continued publication of his works. Piloty died in Munich.
