= Jacob Nachod =

German Jewish banker and businessman

- Born: 22 March 1814; Dresden, Saxony, German Confederation
- Died: 11 April 1882; Leipzig, Saxony, Germany
- Occupations: Businessman; Banker; Philanthropist
- Spouse: Johanna Meyer (1823–1870)
- Children: 3
- Parent(s): Naftali Simcha Nachod (1765–1822); Bella Liebling (1781–1851)

Jacob Nachod (22 March 1814 – 11 April 1882) was a German-Jewish businessman-banker and philanthropist.

== Life ==
Jacob Nachod was born in Dresden. Naftali Simcha Nachod (1765–1822), his father, had been born in Aussig (Bohemia), but by the time Jacob was born the family were well established in Dresden. He was one of his father's younger children, possibly the youngest. After his father died Jacob went away to attend the "Samson school", the Jewish "free school" in Wolfenbüttel, between 1826 and 1829. Joachim Nachod, Jacob's elder brother, who later became a language teacher and a university professor at Edinburgh, added modern languages to his education.

In 1830, after relocating to Leipzig, Nachod joined the banking house "Meyer & Co". His training period involved not just the use of foreign languages but also a sound grounding in commercial law. Around the same time he married Johanna Meyer from Dresden. In due course the marriage produced two recorded sons and one daughter.

In 1839 he joined the Leipzig trading business "Knaut & Storrow" which soon became the principal focus of his business career. He achieved rapid promotion, starting as a book keeper and progressing via the purchasing department. In 1852, he became a partner in the company which was now relaunched as the Bankhaus Knauth, Nachod & Kühne. It became one of the leading import/export businesses engaged in trade with North America and, as the name indicated, operated its own banking division.

Success in business resulted in growing self confidence and Nachod became a leading citizen of Leipzig's business community. Within the still small but already influential Jewish community, in 1844 he established a Society of Friends in Leipzig. In Saxony the Law on the Religious Practices of the Jews had been enacted in 1837, opening the way for synagogues to be built in Dresden and Leipzig. From the Society of Friends there soon emerged an active "Israelite Religious Community" ("Israelitische Religionsgemeinschaft") in the city: Nachod played a prominent part in it for the rest of his life. He was also a co-founder of the "German-Israelite Communities Association" ("Deutsch-Israelitischen Gemeindebund"), serving between 1873 and 1882 as its president. He was involved in establishing a number of other Jewish and Interdenominational societies and foundations.

Jacob Nachod received Saxon citizens' rights in 1852, and that year he became Leipzig's first city councillor from the Jewish community. Meanwhile in 1852 work began on Leipzig's first synagogue: it was consecrated in 1855. From the outset it was determined that the building should be available not just for Leipzig's Jews, but for regular visitors from elsewhere who came to the city in connection with its famous trade fairs. The liberal synagogue was one of the most important new religious buildings in the Germany of its time. It was decided that sermons should be delivered in German and chanting should use arrangements that involved organ accompaniment.

== Family ==
Jacob and Joanna Nachod had three children:

- Alexander Nachod (died 1870). Children
- Marie Louise Nachod (1848-1924), married Carl Jacob Anton Max Jaffé
- Friedrich Nachod (1853-1911), married Marie Eisner. Children and remoter issue.

Friedrich Nachod went into business, and like his father later became a part owner of a bank. He also followed his father in becoming a vice-consul for the United States of America in Leipzig.
