= Karl von Piloty =

German painter (1826–1886)

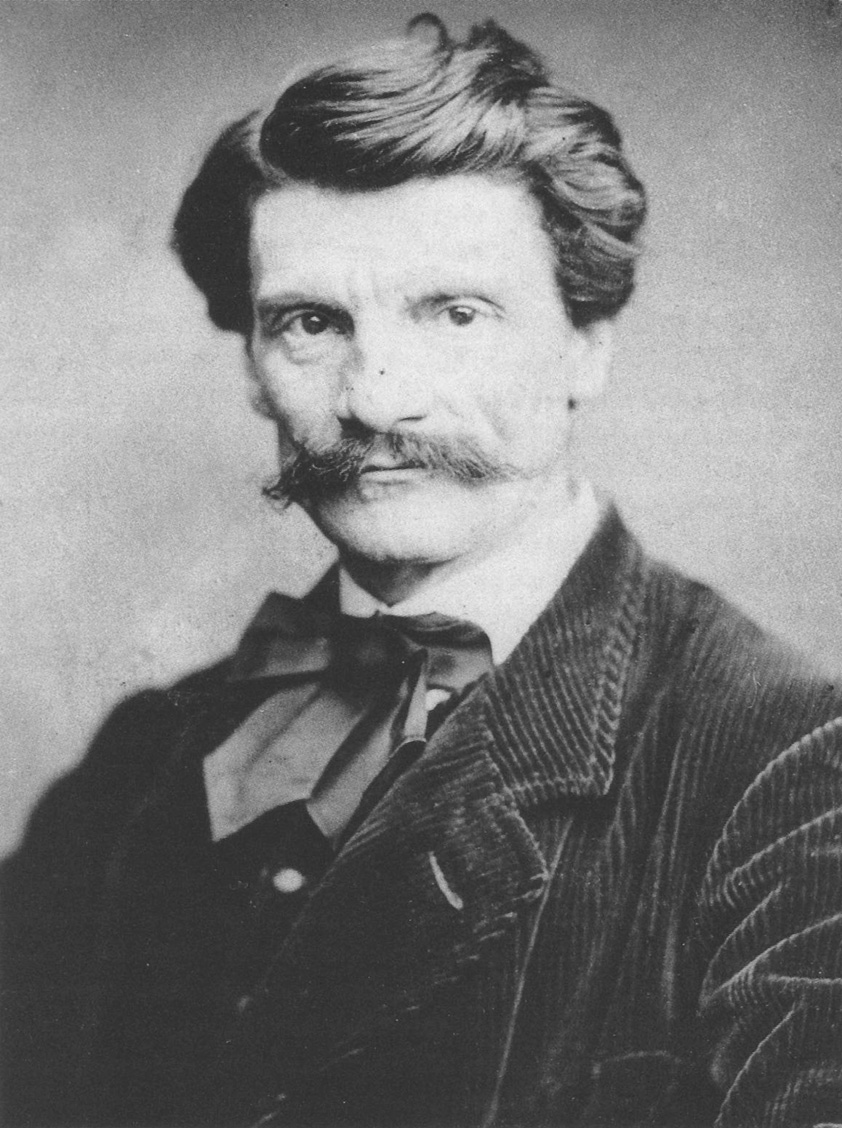
- photograph by Franz Hanfstaengl
- Born: Karl von Piloty; October 1, 1826; Munich, Germany
- Died: June 21, 1886 (aged 59)
- Education: Munich Academy
- Occupations: Painter and academy keeper
- Parent: Ferdinand Piloty (father)

Karl Theodor von Piloty (1 October 1826 – 21 July 1886) was a German painter, noted for his historical subjects, and recognised as the foremost representative of the realistic school in Germany.

== Life and work ==
Piloty was born in Munich. His father, Ferdinand Piloty (d. 1844), enjoyed a great reputation as a lithographer. In 1840, Karl was admitted as a student of the Munich Academy, under the artists Karl Schorn and Julius Schnorr von Karolsfeld. A year later the acclaimed history paintings (referred to as the 'Belgian paintings'), i.e. the Compromise of the nobles and The Abdication of Charles V by the two Belgian artists Edouard de Bièfve and Louis Gallait, were shown in Munich and their realistic depiction of a historic subject matter made a lasting impression on him. After a journey to Belgium, France and England, Piloty commenced work as a painter of genre pictures, and, in 1853, produced a work, Die Amme (The Wet Nurse), which, on account of its originality of style, caused a considerable sensation in Germany at the time.

But he soon forsook this branch of painting in favour of historical subjects, and produced in 1854 for King Maximilian II The Foundation of the Catholic League by Maximilian I in 1609. It was succeeded by Seni at the Dead Body of Wallenstein (1855), which gained for the young painter the membership of the Munich Academy, where he succeeded Schorn (his brother-in-law) as professor in 1856.

Among other well-known works by Piloty are the Battle of the White Mountain near Prague, Nero Dancing upon the Ruins of Rome (1861), Godfrey of Bouillon on a Pilgrimage to the Holy Land (1861), Galileo in Prison (1864) and The Death of Alexander the Great (unfinished), his last great work. He also executed a number of mural paintings for the royal palace in Munich.

For Baron von Schach, Piloty painted the famous Discovery of America. In 1874, he was appointed keeper of the Munich Academy, being afterwards ennobled by the king of Bavaria. Piloty was the foremost representative of the realistic school in Germany. He was a successful teacher, and among his more famous pupils were Hans Makart, Franz von Lenbach, Franz Defregger, Gabriel von Max, Georgios Jakobides, Eduard von Grützner, and Gyula Benczúr.

== Gallery ==
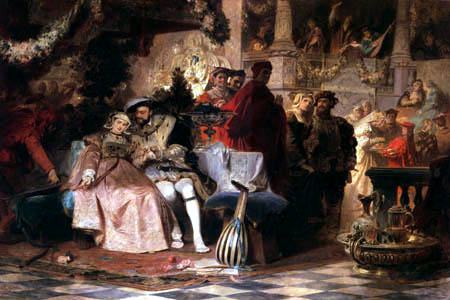
Henry VIII and Anne Boleyn

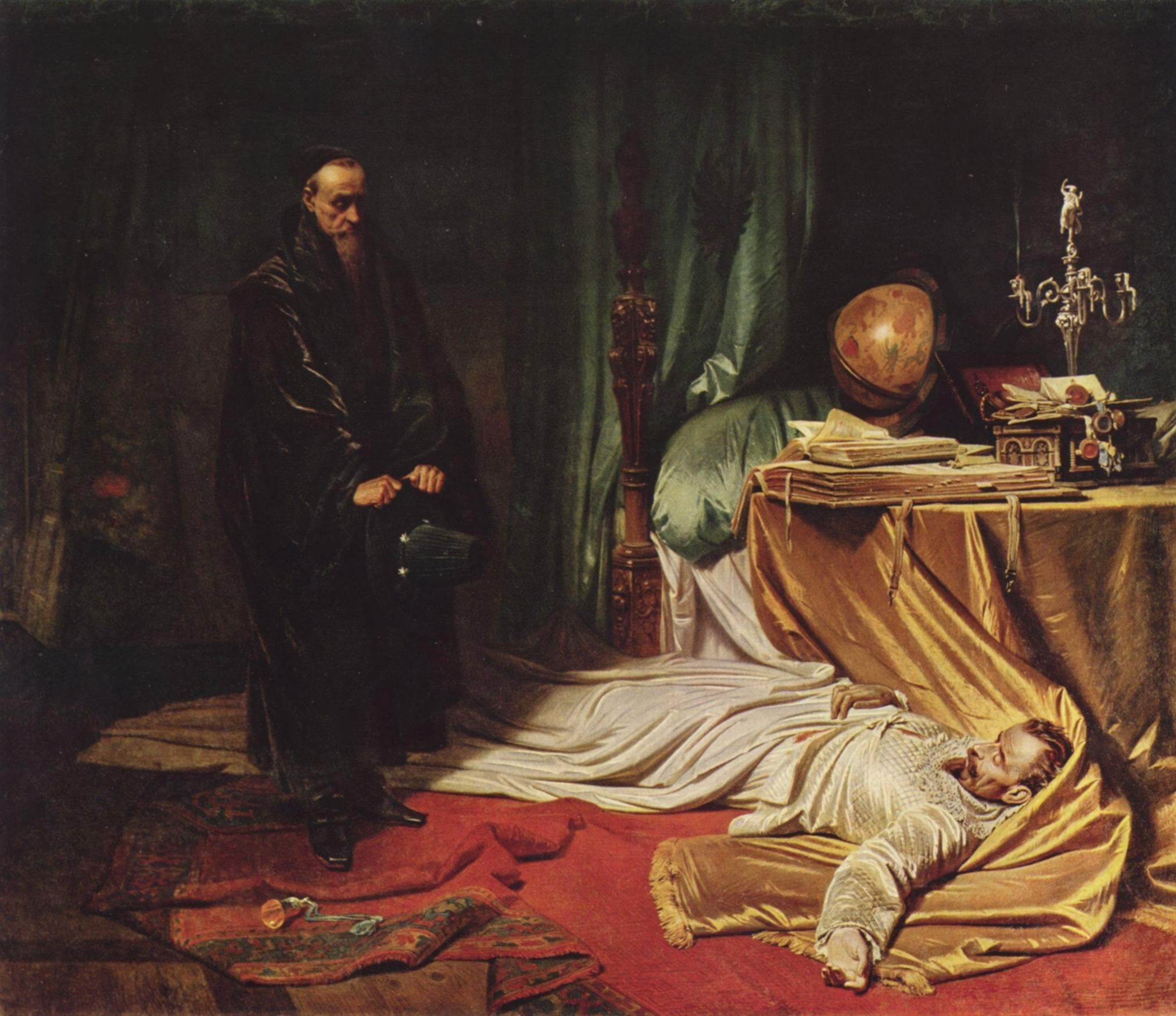
The Death of Wallenstein

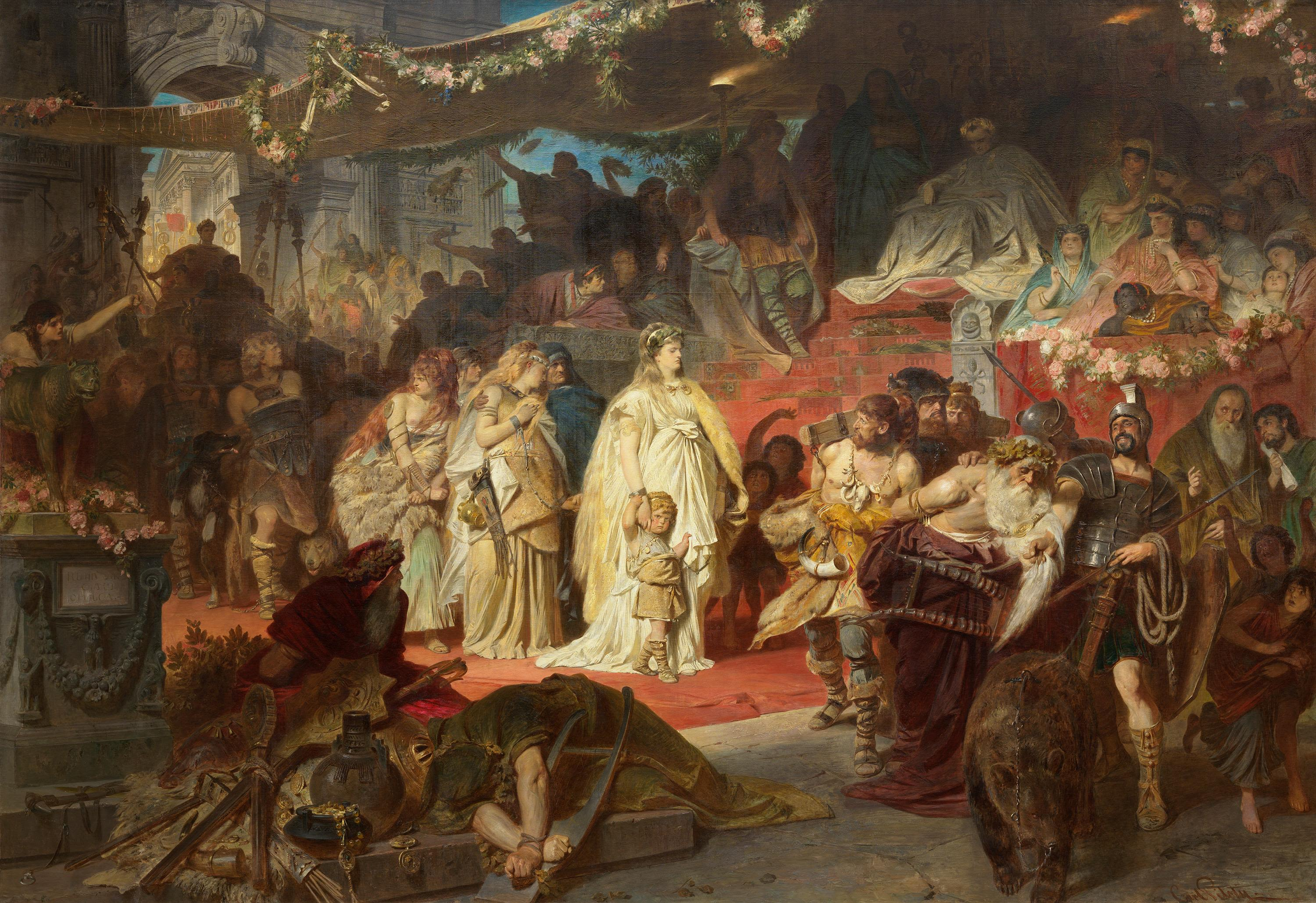
Thusnelda at the
Triumph of Germanicus

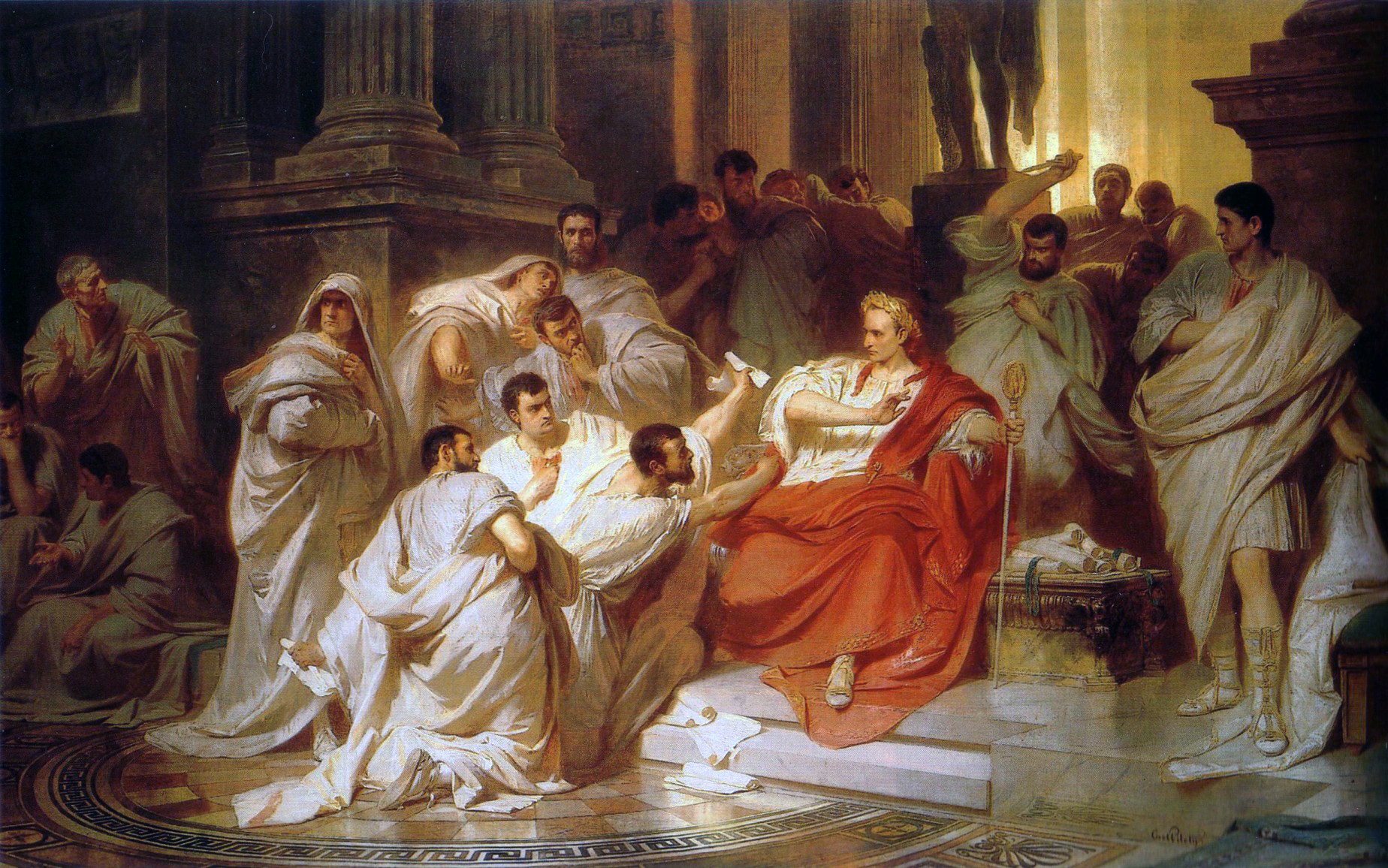
The Murder of Caesar

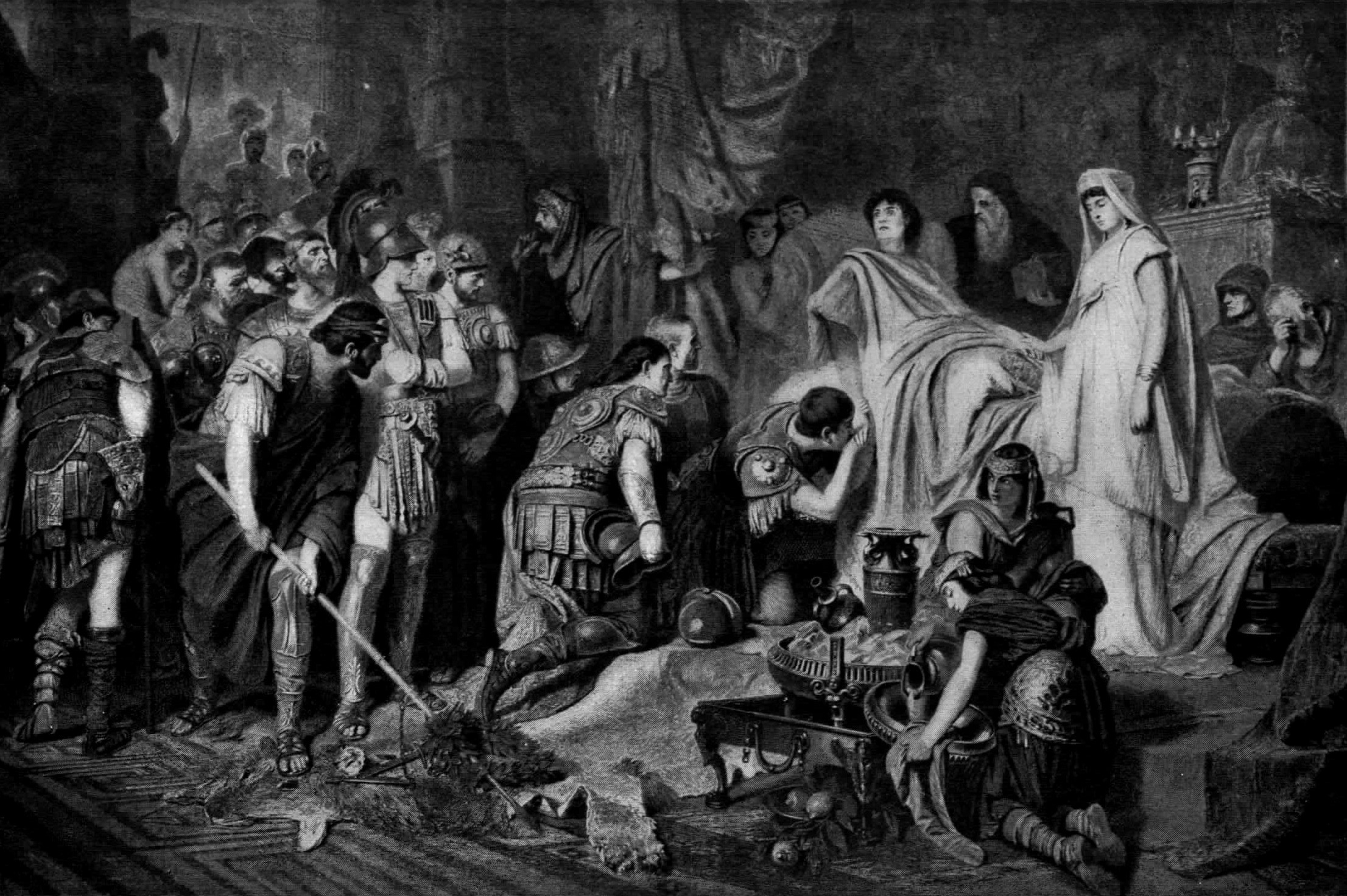
The Death of Alexander the Great
