= François-Joseph-Victor Broussais =

French physician (1772–1838)

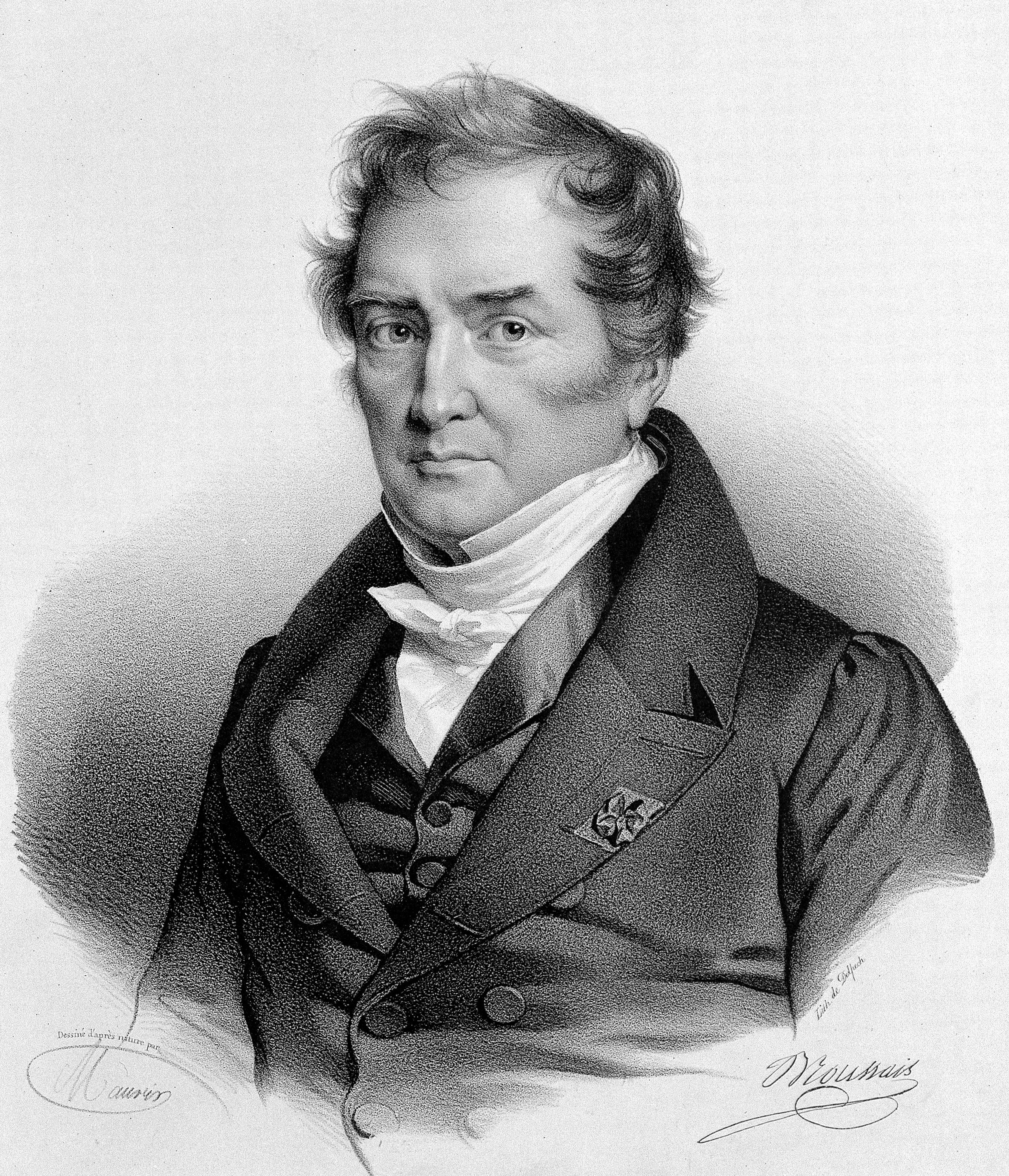
- Born: 17 December 1772; Saint-Malo, France
- Died: 17 November 1838 (aged 65); Vitry-sur-Seine, France

François-Joseph-Victor Broussais (17 December 1772 – 17 November 1838) was a French medical doctor.

== Life ==
François-Joseph-Victor Broussais was born in Saint-Malo. From his father, who was also a physician, he received his first instructions in medicine, and he studied for some years at a college in Dinan named after him, Collège François Broussais. At the age of seventeen he entered one of the newly formed republican regiments, but ill-health compelled him to withdraw after two years. He resumed his medical studies, and then obtained an appointment as surgeon in the navy. In 1799 he proceeded to Paris, where he studied under physician, surgeon, and physiologist Xavier Bichat. Bichat's focus on the strong connection between physiology pathology can also be recognized in Broussais' medical theories. In 1803 he graduated as M.D. and in 1805 he again joined the army in a professional capacity, and served in Germany and the Netherlands. He returned to Paris, then left again for active service in Spain.

In 1814 he returned to Paris, and was appointed assistant-professor to the military hospital of the Val-de-Grâce, where he first promulgated his views on the relation between life and stimulus, and on the physiological interdependence and sympathies of the various organs. His lectures were attended by great numbers of students, enthusiastic about his new theories.

By degrees his doctrines triumphed, and in 1831 he was appointed professor of general pathology in the academy of medicine. Towards the end of his life he attracted large audiences by lectures on phrenology.

== Works ==
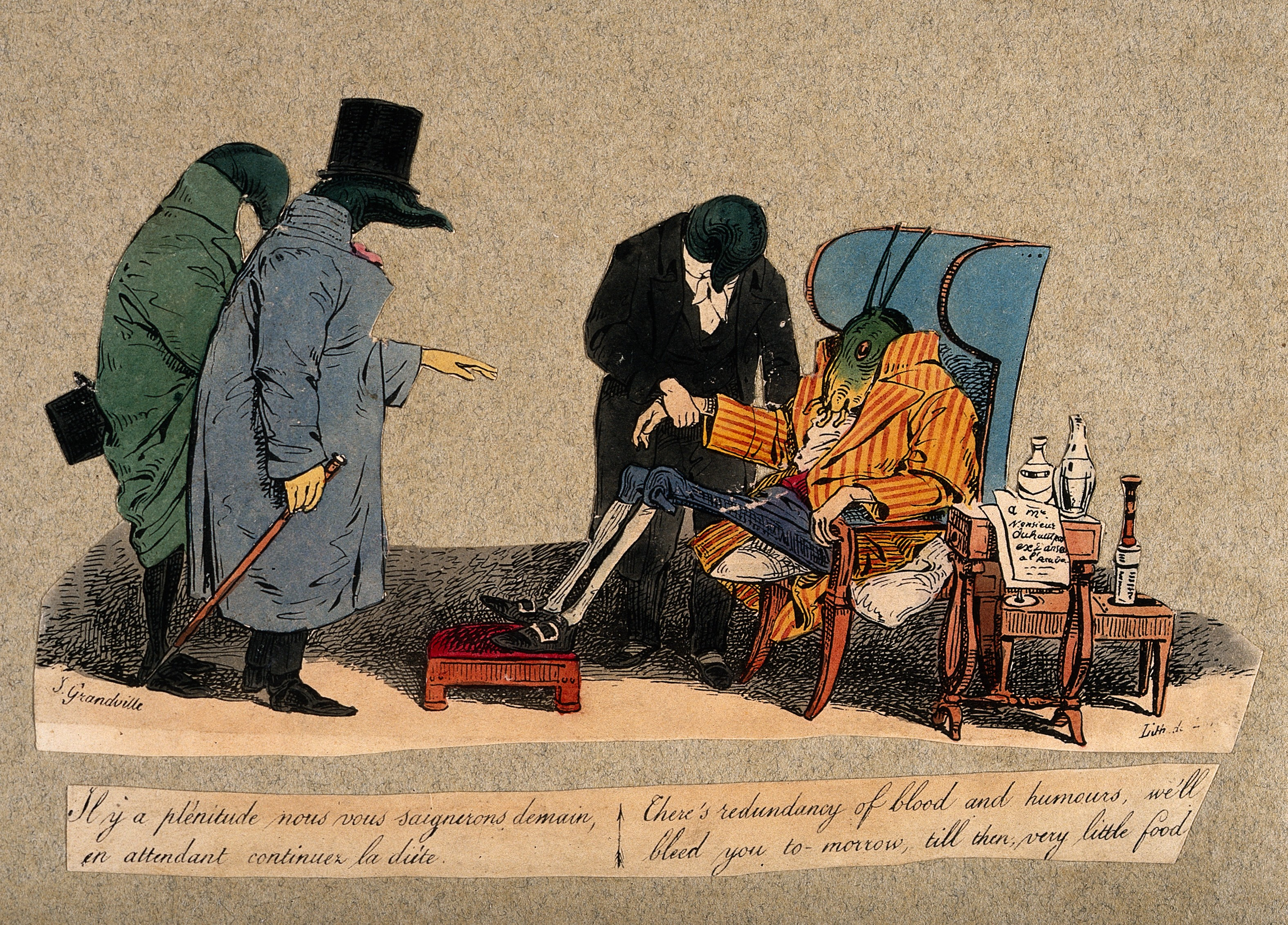
Three leeches acting as physicians attend a grasshopper patient and decide on bloodletting. Lithograph by Broussais after J. J. Grandville, c. 1832

In 1808 he published his Histoire des phlegmasies ou inflammations chroniques [History of phlegmasias or chronic inflammations]; and in Examen de la doctrine médicale généralement adopte [Examination of the generally adopted medical doctrine], which brought the opposition of the medical faculty of Paris. In 1828 he published a work De l'irritation et de la folie [On irritation and madness]. When he became ill with indigestion, Broussais applied 50–60 leeches throughout his body approximately 15 times.

== Theory of medicine ==
Disagreeing with many of his predecessors, such as Laennec, Bayle, and Louis, Broussais believed in the importance of physiology. He believed that diseases occurred when normal functions failed or were modified. Broussais' theory, known as medical physiology, argued that some diseases are just a result of irritation due to excitation or stimulation. This medical physiology became the most popular form of medical theory in Paris in the 19th century. It is believed that irritation then caused inflammation, which primarily occurred at the gastrointestinal tract in most diseases. Then, this irritation would pass to other organs "sympathetically". This led Broussais to believe that mild bloodletting could heal every illness. Broussais passionately advocated the use of leeches in bloodletting procedures, due to the belief that it was more gentle. With one particular patient, he prescribed around ninety leeches be placed over the body for this purpose. Additionally, Broussais believed that the ill were sthenic and needed to be prescribed sedatives.
