= Central Institute of Hindi =

- Founder: Department of Higher Education
- Established: 1960
- Location: Agra, Uttar Pradesh, India
- Website: hindisansthan.in

The Central Institute of Hindi (Hindi: केन्द्रीय हिन्दी संस्थान Kendrīya Hindī Sansthān) is an institution that promotes the Hindi language in India. It is run by the Ministry of Human Resource Development of the Government of India. It was established in 1960 by the Ministry of Education, engaged in teaching of Hindi as a foreign and second language. It is headquartered in Agra.

Apart from conducting regular and residential Hindi language courses for foreign students, the institute also conducts regular teacher-training programmes for teachers of Hindi belonging to various states of India. The institute is situated at an 11 acres (4.5 ha) campus on the outskirts of Agra city. The institute further has eight regional centers in Delhi, Hyderabad, Mysore, Shillong, Dimapur, Guwahati, Ahmedabad and Bhubaneswar. The institute is the only government-run institution in India established solely for research and teaching of Hindi as a foreign and second language.

== History ==
On 19 March 1960, the Ministry of Education of India established the All-Indian Hindi Education College (Hindi: अखिल भारतीय हिन्दी शिक्षण महाविद्यालय Akhil Bhārtīy Hindī Śikṣaṇ Mahāvidyālay). On 1 November 1960 the body was officially registered per the Societies Registration Act. The first chairman of this body was notable Indian independence activity and promoter of Hindi Moturi Satyanarayana.

It was renamed the Central Institute of Hindi in 1963.

=== Leadership ===
Chairpersons
Name	Start	End
Moturi Satyanarayana	1960	1962
Balakrishna Rao	1962	
Kalyan Mal Lodha		
Laxmi Mall Singhvi		

Directors
Name	Start	End
Vinay Mohan Sharma	1962	1962
Brajeshwar Verma	1963	1974
Gopal Sharma	1974	31 May 1979
Ramnath Sahay	1 June 1979	30 December 1979
Balgovind Mishra	31 December 1979	October 1991
Amar Bahadur Singh	October 1991	July 1991
Mahavir Saran Jain	21 July 1991	31 January 2001
Bela Banerjee	1 February 2001	12 March 2002
Nityanand Pandey	13 March 2002	2004
Bela Banerjee	2004	22 March 2005
Shambhunath Sao	23 March 2005	27 November 2008
Ramvir Singh	28 November 2008	30 September 2010
K. Bijay Kumar	1 October 2010	

== Teaching Programmes ==
Kendriya Hindi Sansthan, Agra has been instrumental in propagation of Hindi in national and international spheres. The Institute has been recognized as a world level institution for teaching, learning and research on Hindi. The institute is committed towards propagation of Hindi on national level, establishing Hindi as medium of multi-cultural society of India, and provide for advanced study of different Indian Languages in relation to Hindi language and literature, in order to further the active role of Hindi in national unity and integration.

In addition, the institute has affiliated Colleges namely Mizoram Hindi Teachers Training Institute, Aizawl (Mizoram); Govt. Teachers Training Institute, Dimapur (Nagaland); Hindi Teachers Training College, Mysore (Karnataka); Govt. Hindi Teachers Training College, Guwahati (Assam). Institute's courses are run by these Institutions including conduction of their admissions and examinations. At present the institute is running 13 training and teaching programmes. Till date 68,129 students (data until July 2012) have been trained under 26 programmes. Around 3612 foreign students from 71 countries have received diplomas under the scheme of Propagation of Hindi Abroad. The following programmes are being conducted by Central Institute of Hindi:

=== Hindi Teachers Training Programmes ===
Sl.No.	Course Name	Duration	No. Of students trained till date (July 2012)
1	Hindi Shikshan Nishnat (Equi. M.Ed.) :	One year	692
2	Hindi Shikshan Parangat (Equi. B.Ed.)	One year	3029
3	Hindi Shikshan Praveen (Equi. B.T.C.)	One year	1936
4	Hindi Shikshan Vishesh Gahan Course	One year	620
5	Three year Diploma courses	One year	718
6	Distance Educational Programme	One year	5337

==== Short Term Courses (Orientation and Refresher Courses) ====
Till date 42,750 teacher-trainees have received training under this programme. Institute strives to train 2700 in-service Hindi teachers through its 50 programmes every year.

=== International Hindi Teaching Program (under Propagation of Hindi Abroad Scheme) ===
Sanshan has been conducting various Hindi language proficiency courses for international students since 1971 at Agra and Delhi. The institute also conducts similar courses in Afghanistan and Sri Lanka.	3612 students belonging to more than 71 countries have been trained so far (July 2012)

=== Vocational courses (evening programmes) Regional students ===
These programmes are being conducted at Agra and Delhi.

Sl.No.	Course Name	No. Of students trained till date
1	Applied Hindi linguistics course	1018
2	Translation theory and practices	1362
3	Mass communication and Journalism diploma	666

== Research and study ==
=== Seminars and Workshops ===
Kendriya Hindi Sansthan organizes various National seminars and short budget seminars on Hindi language, literature and language teaching, language technology etc. at its headquarter and regional centers.

=== Preparation of Digital Language teaching and Learning Materials ===
Kendriya Hindi Sansthan has a digital language lab and audio recording studio. Institute is producing various digital teaching and learning materials by making use of information and language technology.

=== Lexical Resources ===
For enriching the Hindi Vocabulary and preserve dialects of Hindi language, the Institute undertakes various programmes viz., preparation of ‘Lok shabdkosh’ and ‘Corpora’ (Corpus of Hindi language) and ‘Collection of Folk Literature from North-Eastern India’. Under this programme, Brajbhasha-Hindi-English Lok shabdkosh, Marwari-Hindi-English Lokshabdkosh, Awadhi-Hindi- English Lok shabdkosh, Bundeli-Hindi-English Lok shabdkosh are under preparation. Digital and printed Bhojpuri-Hindi-English Lok Shabdkosh was published in the year 2009.

=== Department of Instructional Material Production ===
The programme of this department depends on researches done in regional languages. The data collected is utilized in preparation of Hindi textbooks for second/other language learners. This department also undertakes on requests of several State Governments for preparation of Hindi textbooks. Kendriya Hindi Sansthan has prepared these instructional materials for the State of Mizoram, Meghalaya, Nagaland and Sikkim. The materials are published and taught in the schools of State Governments. Under these Instructional material,

1. Text-books, 2. Learners Dictionary, 3. Learner's Grammar and Teacher's handbook are prepared. Institute has also prepared Instructional Material for 5 tribal dialects (Kurukh, Halbi, Godi, Korku and Bheeli) of MP and Chhattisgarh keeping in view the problem of second language learners.

=== Publications ===
The department of publication has published nearly 100 titles out of which some are the collections of articles presented in the seminars. Institute publishes six journals and magazines regularly: 1. Research Journal ‘Gaveshna’ (गवेषणा), 2. Media, 3. ‘Samanvay Purvottar’, 3. Vishva Bharti, 5. Samanvay, 6. Sansthan Samachar.

=== Library ===
The library of the institute has one of the best collections of books on Hindi language, literature and learning. There are 50,000 titles under the head of applied linguistics, comparative literature, manuscripts and applied Hindi education. The regional centers of the institute are also developing their own libraries.

== Awards ==
Each year Kendriya Hindi Sansthan organizes various awards under ‘Hindi Sevi Samman Yojana’ in seven categories. These awards are conferred by the President of India to the people who have contributed in the propagation and enrichment of Hindi language in India and abroad. The categories of awards are as follows: (1) Gangasharan Singh Award, (2) Ganesh Shankar Vidyarthi Award, (3) Atmaram Award, (4) Subrahmanyam Bharti Award, (5) Mahapandit Rahul Sankrutyayan Award, (6) Dr George Abraham Grierson Award, (7)Padma Bhushan Dr Moturi Satyanarayan Award. This awards are conferred each year on world Hindi day (10 January).
