= Moortidevi Award =

Indian literary award

- Award for contributions to literature
- Awarded for: Literary award in India
- Sponsored by: Bharatiya Jnanpith
- Reward: ₹4 lakh (US$4,300)
- First award: 1983 (Instituted in 1961)
- Final award: 2019
- Most recent winner: Vishwanath Prasad Tiwari

Highlights
- Total awarded: 30
- First winner: C. K. Nagaraja Rao

The Moortidevi Award is an Indian literary award annually presented by the Bharatiya Jnanpith, a literary and research organisation. The award is given only to Indian writers writing in Indian languages included in the Eighth Schedule to the Constitution of India, and in English, (Note: The Eighth Schedule to the Constitution of India consists of twenty-two languages viz. Assamese, Bengali, Bodo, Dogri, Gujarati, Hindi, Kannada, Kashmiri, Konkani, Maithili, Malayalam, Manipuri, Marathi, Nepali, Odia, Punjabi, Sanskrit, Santhali, Sindhi, Tamil, Telugu, and Urdu.) with no posthumous conferral or self nomination.

From 2003, the award was given to the authors for their "contemplative and perceptive work" and consisted of a cash prize of ₹1 lakh (US$1,600), a citation plaque, a shawl, and a statue of Saraswati, the Hindu goddess of knowledge and wisdom. The cash prize was raised to ₹2 lakh (US$2,100) in 2011 and to ₹4 lakh (US$4,300) in 2013. The first recipient of the award was the Kannada writer C. K. Nagaraja Rao who was honoured in 1983 for his novel, Pattamahadevi Shantala Devi, which was published in four volumes.

No awards were given in 1985 and between 1996 and 1999. The award has been conferred upon 31 writers including one female author: In 1991, Odia academic and writer Pratibha Ray became the first woman to win the award and was honoured for the 1985 novel Yajnasani. Ray and Nirmal Verma have won both the Moortidevi as well as the Jnanpith Award. As of 2019, Hindi writer and professor, Vishwanath Prasad Tiwari is the most recent recipient of the award.

Three recipients of Moortidevi Award -- Pratibha Ray (1991), Nirmal Verma (1995), and Akkitham Achuthan Namboothiri (2009) -- went on to win the Jnanpith Award, considered the highest Indian literary honor, in 2011, 1999, and 2019, respectively.

== Background ==
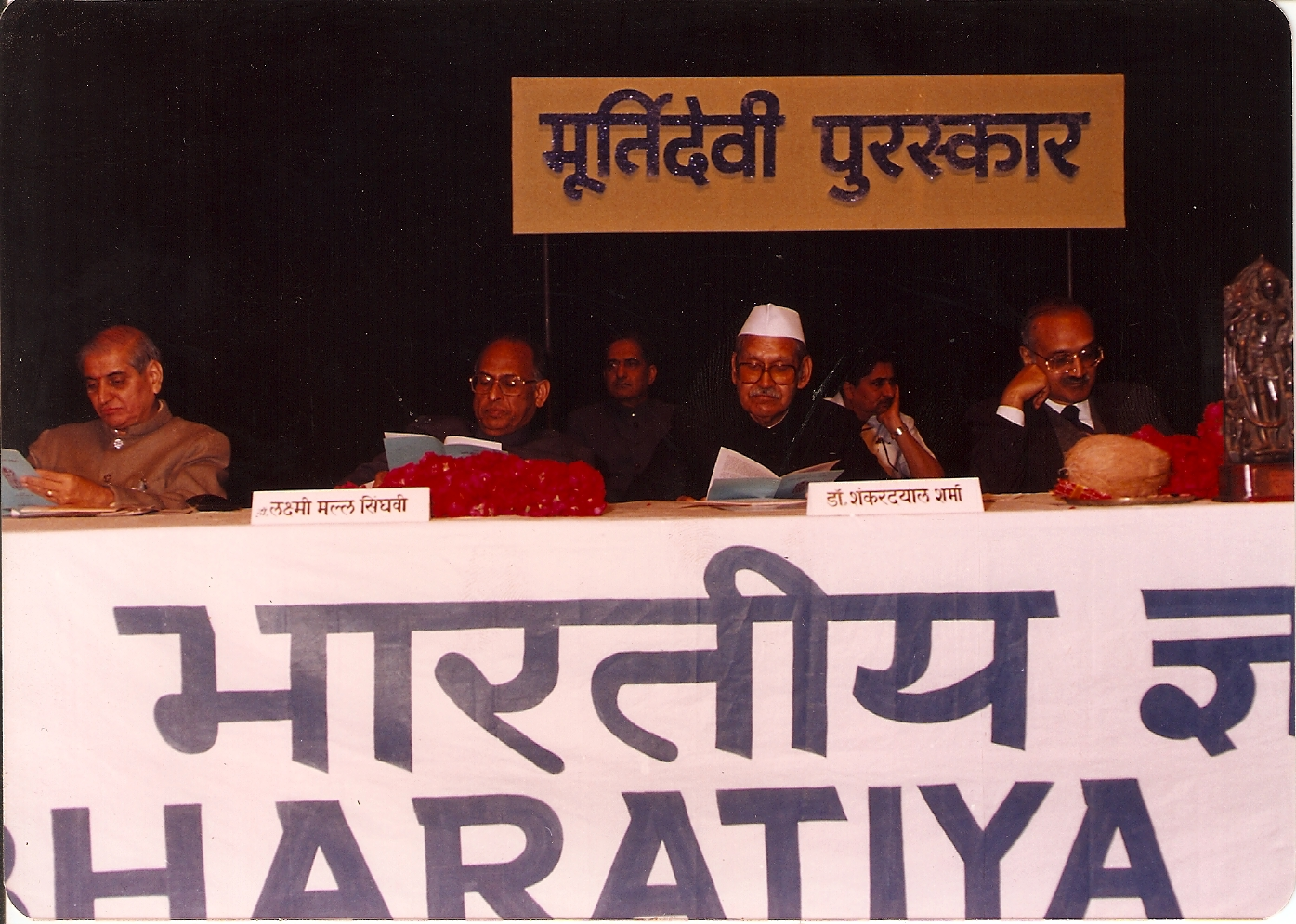
Moortidevi Award Ceremony presided over by President S. D Sharma.

The Bharatiya Jnanpith, a research and cultural institute founded in 1944 by industrialist Sahu Shanti Prasad Jain of the Sahu Jain family, conceived an idea in May 1961 to start a scheme "commanding national prestige and of international standard" to "select the best book out of the publications in Indian languages". In November that year, Rama Jain, the Founder President of the Bharatiya Jnanpith, invited a few literary experts to discuss various aspects of the scheme. Jain, along with Kaka Kalelkar, Harivansh Rai Bachchan, Ramdhari Singh Dinkar, Jainendra Kumar, Jagdish Chandra Mathur, Prabhakar Machwe, Akshaya Kumar Jain, and Lakshmi Chandra Jain, presented the initial draft to the then President of India—Rajendra Prasad who had shown interest in the scheme's implementation. The idea was also discussed at the 1962 annual sessions of the All India Gujarati Sahitya Parishad and the Bharatiya Bhasha Parishad. The award is given in the memory of Moortidevi, mother of Sahu Jain, and was first presented in 1983.

== Selection process ==
Only the work of a living author, published at least one year and at the most ten years before the relevant award year, is considered. The Selection Committee is free to consider any other works besides the proposals submitted to it. No award may be declared for a year if the selection committee does not find any work measuring up to the required standard. The nominations for the award are received from several literary experts, teachers, critics, universities, and numerous literary and language associations. Every three years, an advisory committee is constituted for each of the languages. Each committee consists of three literary critics and scholars of their respective languages.

The Selection Board consists of between seven and eleven members of "high repute and integrity". Each member is part of the committee for a term of three years which can also be extended further for two more terms at most. The recommendations of all language advisory committees are evaluated by the board based on complete or partial translations of the selected writings of the proposed writers into Hindi or English.

== Recipients ==
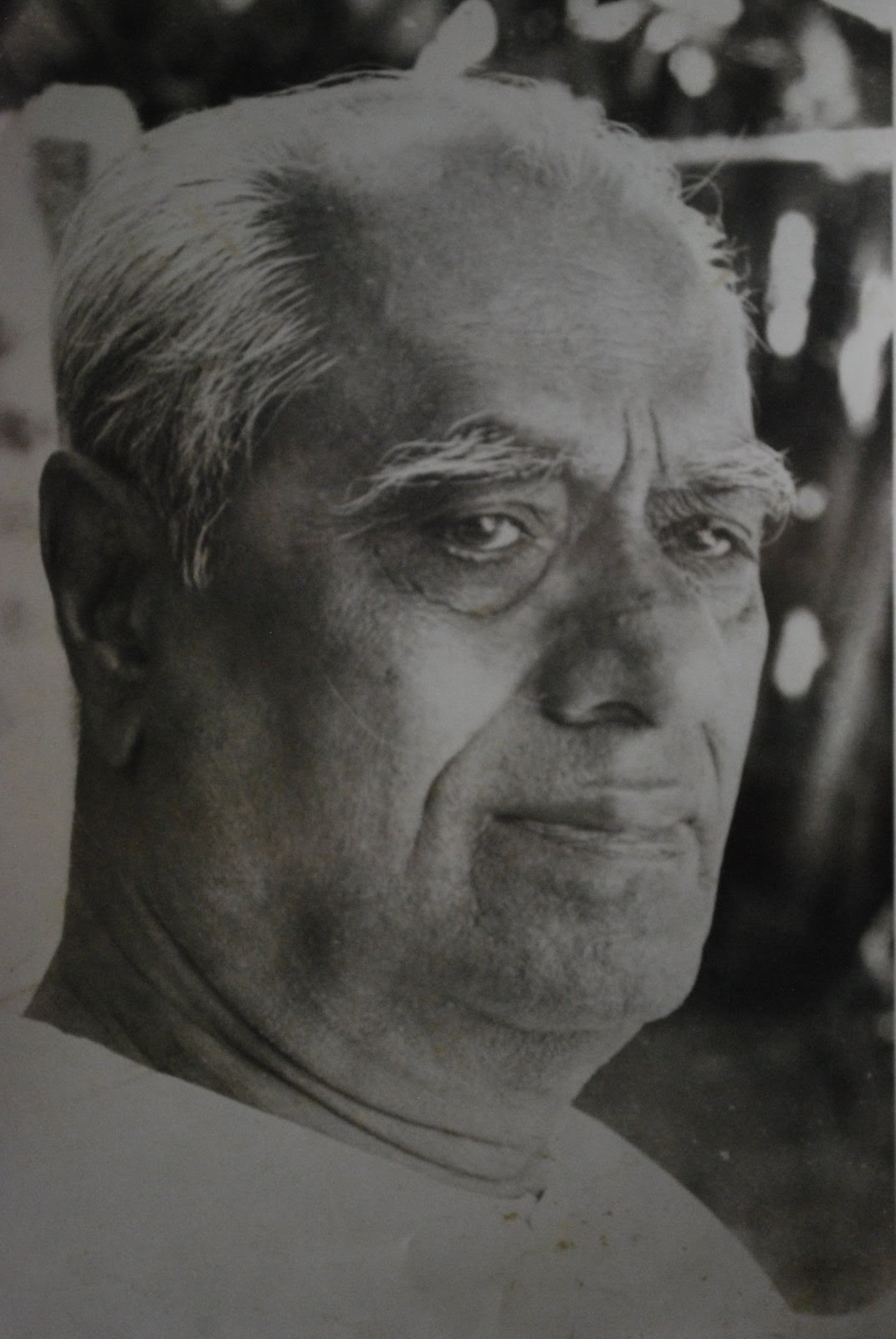
C. K. Nagaraja Rao was the first recipient of the award.

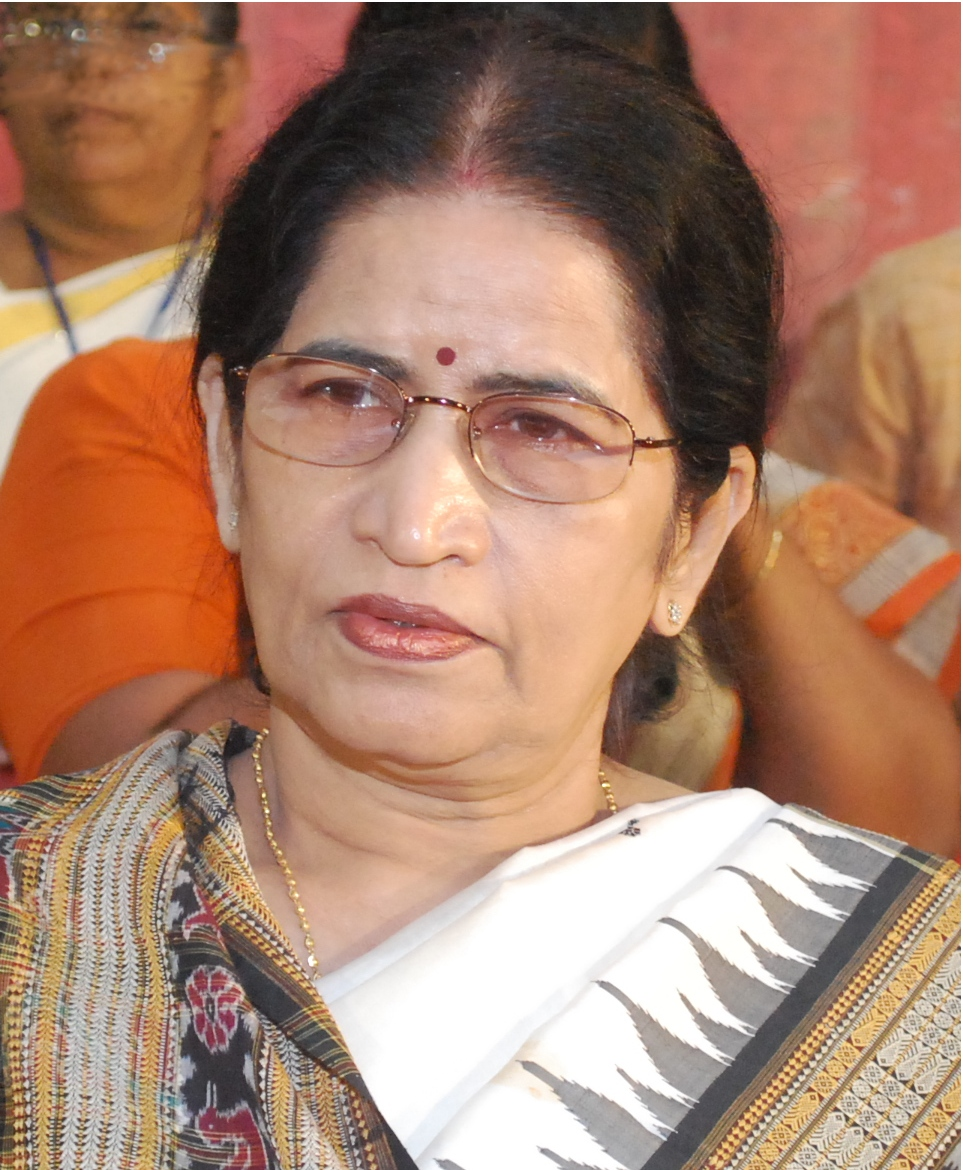
Pratibha Ray is the only female recipient of the award.

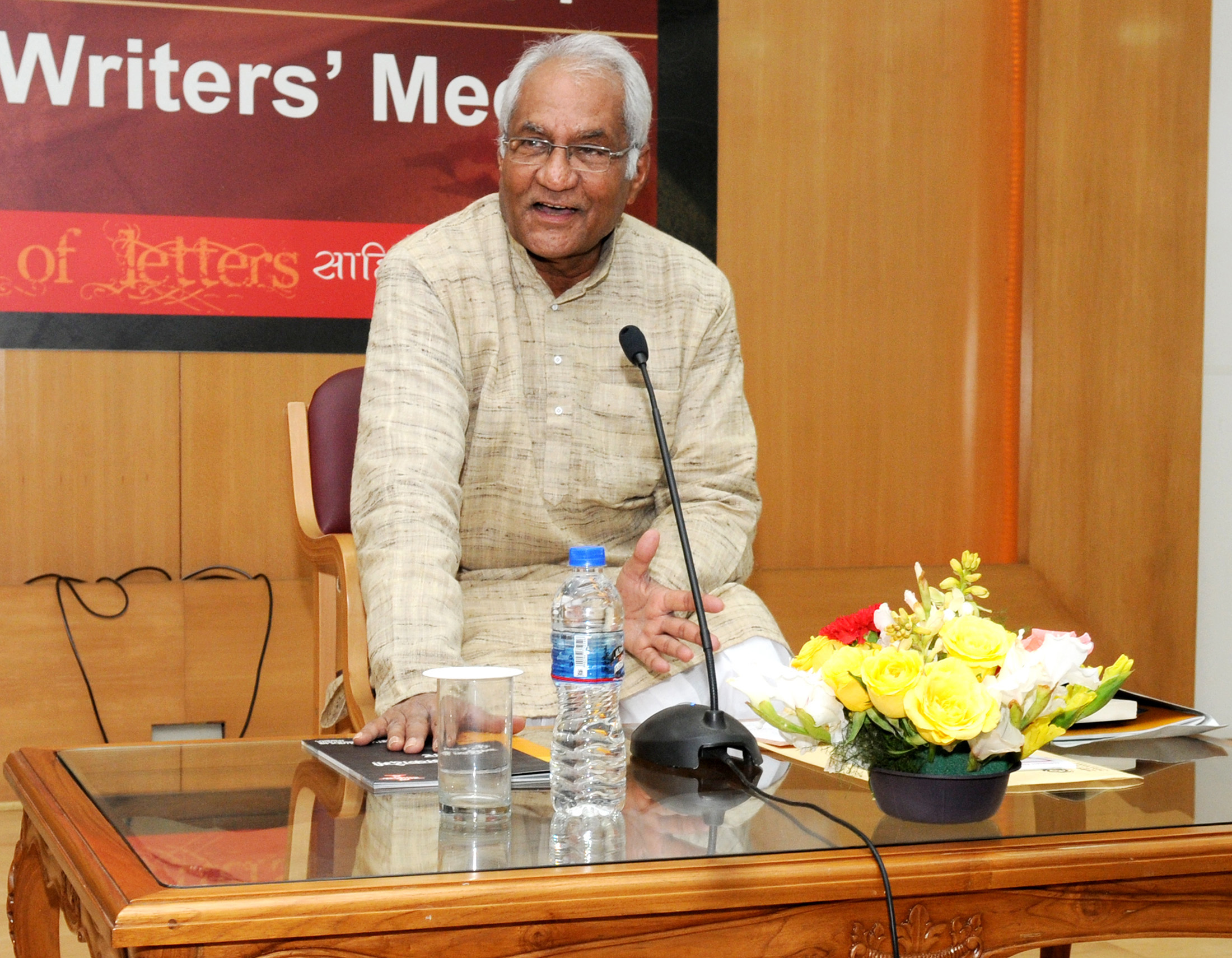
Vishwanath Prasad Tiwari is the most recent recipient of the award.

List of award recipients, showing the year, and language
Year	Recipient	Work	Language	Ref.
1983 (1st)	C. K. Nagaraja Rao	Pattamahadevi Shantala Devi	Kannada	
1984 (2nd)	Virendra Kumar Sakhlecha	—	Hindi	
1986 (3rd)	Kanhaiyalal Sethia	—	Rajasthani	
1987 (4th)	Manubhai Pancholi	Zer To Pidha Chhe Jani Jani	Gujarati	
1988 (5th)	Vishnu Prabhakar	—	Hindi	
1989 (6th)	Vidya Niwas Mishra	—	Hindi	
1990 (7th)	Munishree Nagraj	—	Hindi	
1991 (8th)	Pratibha Ray	Yagnaseni	Odia	
1992 (9th)	Kuber Nath Rai	—	Hindi	
1993 (10th)	Shyamacharan Dubey	—	Hindi	
1994 (11th)	Shivaji Sawant	Mrityunjay	Marathi	
1995 (12th)	Nirmal Verma	Bharat aur Europe: Pratishruti ke Shetra	Hindi	
2000 (13th)	Govind Chandra Pande	Sahitiya Saundarya aur Sanskriti	Hindi	
2001 (14th)	Rammurti Tripathi	Shriguru Mahima	Hindi	
2002 (15th)	Yashdev Shalya	—	Hindi	
2003 (16th)	Kalyan Mal Lodha	—	Hindi	
2004 (17th)	Narayan Desai	Maroon Jeewan Aaj Mari Vaani	Gujarati	
2005 (18th)	Rammurti Sharma	Bharatiya Darshan Ki Chintadhara	Hindi	
2006 (19th)	Krishna Bihari Mishra	Kalpataru ke Utsav Leela	Hindi	
2007 (20th)	Veerappa Moily	Shri Ramayana Mahanveshanam	Kannada	
2008 (21st)	Raghuvansh Raghuvansh	Paschimi Bhautik Samskriti Ka Utthan Aur Patan	Hindi	
2009 (22nd)	Akkitham Achuthan Namboothiri	Various poems	Malayalam	
2010 (23rd)	Gopi Chand Narang	Urdu Ghazal aur Hindustani Zehn-o Tahzeeb	Urdu	
2011 (24th)	Gulab Kothari	Ahmev Radha, Ahmev Krishnah	Hindi	
2012 (25th)	Haraprasad Das	Vamsha	Odia	
2013 (26th)	C. Radhakrishnan	Theekkadal Katanhu Thirumadhuram	Malayalam	
2014 (27th)	Vishwanath Tripathi	Vyomkesh Darvesh	Hindi	
2015 (28th)	Kolakaluri Enoch	Ananta Jeevanam	Telugu	
2016 (29th)	M. P. Veerendra Kumar	Hymavathabhoovil	Malayalam	
2017 (30th)	Joy Goswami	Du Dondo Phowara Matro	Bengali	
2019 (31st)	Vishwanath Prasad Tiwari	Asti Aur Bhavti	Hindi	

== Moortidevi recipients by language ==
Out of twenty-three eligible languages, the award has been presented for works in ten languages. The 31 Moortidevi awardees from 1983 to 2019 wrote in the following languages:

Language	Number
Hindi	17
Malayalam	3
Gujarati	2
Kannada	2
Odia	2
Bengali	1
Marathi	1
Rajasthani	1 (Note: The 1986 awardee Kanhaiyalal Sethia wrote in Rajasthani, which is not included in the Eighth Schedule to the Constitution of India.)
Telugu	1
Urdu	1
Assamese	0
Bodo	0
Dogri	0
English	0
Kashmiri	0
Konkani	0
Maithili	0
Manipuri	0
Nepali	0
Punjabi	0
Sanskrit	0
Santali	0
Sindhi	0
Tamil	0

== See also ==
- Jnanpith Award, another annual literary award, regarded as the highest Indian literary honor and also conferred by the Bharatiya Jnanpith.
- Saraswati Samman, a similar literary award in Indian languages conferred by the K. K. Birla Foundation.
