= Bhambri =

Bhambri (Punjabi: ਭਾਂਬਰੀ) is a Punjabi surname, used by Hindus and Sikhs of the Khatri caste.

== Notable people ==
Notable people with the surname include:

- Ankita Bhambri (born 1986), former Indian tennis player, sister of Sanaa and Yuki, cousin of Prerna.
- C. P. Bhambri (1933–2020), Indian political scientist
- Prerna Bhambri (born 1992), Indian tennis player, cousin of Ankita, Sanaa and Yuki.
- Sanaa Bhambri (born 1988), former Indian tennis player, sister of Ankita and Yuki, cousin of Prerna.
- Sarthak Bhambri (born 1998), Indian track and field athlete
- Shivam Bhambri (born 1995), Indian cricketer
- Yuki Bhambri (born 1992), Indian tennis player, brother of Ankita and Sanaa, cousin of Prerna.
