= Solvathellam Unmai =

Solvathellam Unmai (lit. 'All that is said is the truth') may refer to:

- Solvathellam Unmai (film), a 1987 Tamil-language film
- Solvathellam Unmai (TV series), a 2011 Tamil-language reality show
