= Vidhubala =

Indian actress (born 1954)

Vidhubhala
- Born: 24 May 1954 (age 72)
- Occupations: Actress; Television host
- Years active: 1963–1981; 2005–Present (Television)
- Spouse: Murali Kumar (m. 1977)
- Children: 1
- Parents: K. Bhagyanath; Sulochana
- Relatives: Madhu Ambat (brother)

Vidhubala Menon (born 24 May 1954) is an Indian actress who started her career in the mid-1960s and retired from the industry in 1981. She is well known for hosting the family reality show Kadhayallithu Jeevitham on Amrita TV for 10 years. She has acted in advertisements also.

== Acting career ==
Vidhubala acted in over 100 Malayalam films. Her first movie was School Master, in 1963, which she acted as a Child Artist. She made her debut as a heroine in Taxicar, 1971, with evergreen hero prem nazir, she made her debut as the lead heroine opposite Vincent in K. S Sethumadhavan's Manushya Puthran 1973. Vidhubala acted opposite many of the leading actors of her time, including Prem Nazir, Madhu, Vincent, Mohan, Jayan, Soman, and Kamal Haasan. She quit acting in 1981. Her last film was Nithyavasantham, directed by I. V Sasi, With her favorite actor Prem Nazir.

== Personal life ==
Vidhubala was born to Indian independence activists K. Bhagyanath and Sulochana on 24 May 1954. Her father was also a famed magician. She took to acting with the interest with Prem Nazir films. She is the sister of cinematographer Madhu Ambat. She is married to Murali Kumar, who was the producer of some of her films. Together the couple has a son named Arjun Kumar.

== Awards ==
- Kerala State Television Awards 2017 - Best Anchor : Kadhayallithu Jeevitham

== Filmography ==
=== Malayalam ===
- Ente Gramam (1984)
- Abhinayam (1981) as Radha
- Pratishodh (1980)
- Pappu (1980) as Cameo as herself
- Sooryadhaham (1980)
- Aarohanam (1980) as Mini
- Seetha (1980)
- Kaivarikal Thiriyumbol (1979)
- Ezhamkadalinakkare (1979) as Linda
- Sarppam (1979) as Latha
- Ajnatha Theerangal (1979) as Kavitha
- Sandhyaragam (1979)
- Anyarude Bhoomi (1979)
- Nithya Vasantham (1979)
- Hridayathil Nee Matrem (1979)
- Radha Enna Penkutti (1979)
- Rakthamillatha Manushyan (1979) as Sophie
- Ezhu Nirangal (1979) as Sharada
- Pratheeksha (1979)
- Jimmy (1979) as Marykutty
- Manushyan (1979)
- Vadaka Veedu (1979)
- Valeduthavan Valal (1979)
- Lajjavathi (1979)
- Amritha Chumbanam (1979)
- Agni (1978)
- Amarsham (1978)
- Avalkku Maranamilla (1978)
- Iniyum Puzha Ozhukum (1978) as Radha
- Anumodhanam (1978)
- Ninaku Njanum enikku Neeyum (1978) as Saraswathi
- Ee Manohara Theeram (1978) as Geetha
- Ashwathama (1978)
- Lisa (1978) as Kala
- Yagaswam (1978) as Nandhini
- Rappadikalude Gaatha (1978)
- Sthree Oru Dukham (1978)
- Kaathirunna Nimisham (1978) as Sumathi
- Manoradham (1978)
- Society Lady (1978)
- Pichippoo (1978)
- Vishwaroopam (1978)
- Raju Rahim (1978) as Shobha
- Aashirvadam (1977)
- Akale Akasham (1977)
- Santha Oru Devatha (1977)
- Vishukkani (1977) as Radhika
- Muttathe Mulla (1977) as Geetha
- Aaradhana (1977) as Radha
- Shankupushpam (1977) as Devi
- Amme Anupame (1977)
- Ormakal Marikkumo (1977) as Parvathi
- Ashta Maangalyam (1977)
- Harshabaspam (1977) as Bindhu
- Innale Innu (1977)
- Minimol (1977) ... Usha
- Yatheem (1977)... Sainaba
- Panchamritham (1977)
- Sakhakkale Munnottu (1977)
- Saritha (1977)
- Sneham (1977)
- Taxi Driver (1977)
- Thuruppugulan (1977)
- Itha Ivide Vare (1977) as Susheela
- Veedu Oru swargam (1977)
- Dheere Sameere Yamuna Theere (1977)
- Chirikudukka (1976) as Radha
- Kanyadhanam (1976)
- Sindhu (1976) as Geetha
- Missi (1976)
- Mohiniyattam (1976) as Nirmala
- Parijatham (1976)
- Pickpocket (1976) as Reena
- Rajayogam (1976)
- YudhaBhoomi (1976)
- Njaaval Pazhangal (1976)
- Theekkanal (1976)
- Kuttavum Shikshayum (1976)
- Ajayanum Vijayanum (1976)
- Thomashleeha (1975)
- Pravaham (1975) as Girija
- Boy Friend (1975)
- Sindhu (1975) as Geetha
- Kuttichathan (1975)
- Alibabyum 41 Kallamarum (1975) as Laila
- Love Letter (1975)
- Chandana Chola (1975)
- Kalyana Panthal (1975)
- Chuvanna Sandhyakal (1975) as Rosi
- Rajhamsam (1974)
- Bhoomi Devi Puspiniyayai (1974) as Jaya
- Manushyaputran (1974) as Ammu
- College Girl (1974) as Radha
- Manushyaputhran (1973) as Ammu
- Taxi Car (1972)
- Ummachu (1971)
- Virunnukari (1969) as Mohanam
- Pavappettaval (1967) as Radha
- Jeevikkan Anuvadikku (1967)
- School Master (1964) as Vishalam (Child Artist)

=== Tamil ===
- Ayiram Jenmangal Nee Ennakku (1972)
- Velli Vizha (1972)
- Avanai Sutri
- Ponnukku Thanga Manasu (1973) as Geetha
- Engamma Sapatham (1974)
- Murugan Kaattiya Vazhi (1974)
- Samarpanam (1974) as Lakshmi
- Enakkoru Magan Pirappan (1975) as Mala
- Kasthuri Vijayam (1975)
- Rasi Nalla Rasi (1977)
- Unnai Suttrum Ulagam (1977) as Seetha
- Nee oru Natchathiram (1978)
- Ore Vaanam Ore Bhoomi (1979) as Latha

=== As a Dubbing Artist ===
- Oppol
- Thrishna
- Sringaram
- Naalu Pennungal

== Television ==
Year	Program	Role	Channel	Notes
2010–2020	Kadhayallithu Jeevitham	Host	Amrita TV	This show is adaptation of Tamil show Solvathellam Unmai.
2013	Drisya Soundaryathinte Rajashilpi	Host	Media One	
2018	Orumikkam Punarsrishtikkayi	Host	Amrita TV	
2022	Red Carpet	Mentor	Amrita TV	
2022	Flowers Oru Kodi	Participant	Flowers	
2022	Oru Chiri Iru Chiri Bumper Chiri	Mentor	Mazhavil Manorama	
2023-2024	Sreshtha Bharatham Paithruka Bhartham	Judge	Amrita TV	

Vidhubala is well known for her anchoring style.
