= Nittoor Srinivasa Rau =

3rd Chief Justice of Karnataka High Court

Hon'ble Chief Justice (Retd.) Nittoor Srineevasa Rau

1st Central Vigilance Commissioner
- In office 19 February 1964 – 23 August 1968
- Appointed by: S. Radhakrishnan
- Prime Minister: Jawahar Lal Nehru
- Preceded by: Position established
- Succeeded by: S. Dutt

3rd Chief Justice of Mysore High Court
- In office 29 March 1962 – 7 August 1963; Acting CJ : 14 August 1961 - 28 March 1962
- Appointed by: Rajendra Prasad
- Preceded by: S. R. Das Gupta
- Succeeded by: A. R. Somanath Iyer; H. Hombe Gowda (acting)

Judge of Mysore High Court
- In office 11 June 1955 – 28 March 1962
- Appointed by: Rajendra Prasad
- Acting Chief Justice
- In office 17 July 1957 – 24 July 1957
- Appointed by: Rajendra Prasad
- Preceded by: R. Venkataramaiah
- Succeeded by: S. R. Das Gupta

Advocate General of Mysore
- In office 1953 – 10 June 1955
- Appointed by: Jayachamarajendra Wadiyar (Rajpramukh of Mysore)
- Chief Minister: Kengal Hanumanthaiah
- Preceded by: A. R. Somanath Iyer
- Succeeded by: G. R. Yethirajulu Naidu

Personal details
- Born: 24 August 1903
- Died: 12 August 2004 (aged 100)
- Spouse: Padmamma
- Relations: C. K. Nagaraja Rao (nephew); E. C. George Sudarshan (son-in-law)
- Education: B.Sc and LL.B
- Alma mater: Central College, Bangalore, Madras Law College

Nittoor Srinivasa Rao or Nittur Srinivasa Rao (24 August 1903 – 12 August 2004) was a Gandhian who participated in the Indian independence movement. He was a Chief Justice of the High Court of Mysore State (now Karnataka) and also the first chief of the Central Vigilance Commission of India. He was an acting Governor of the Mysore state and the first person to translate Mahatma Gandhi's autobiography into the Kannada language.

== Early and personal life ==
Nittoor Srinivasa Rau was born in Bangalore into an educated, middle-class Kannada Brahmin family of Mysore state. His father, Nittoor Shamanna, was a school teacher and the headmaster of a school in Hosadurga in Chitradurga district. His mother, Seethamma, was the sister of M. N. Krishna Rao, a government official who, many decades later, would serve as acting Diwan of Mysore for a few months in 1941. Rau's family hailed from the village of Nittoor in Gubbi Taluka of Tumkur district (now in Karnataka), and his family was known by the name of their village in the usual south Indian style. Rau's elder sister Puttamma was the mother of C.K.Nagaraja Rao, a noted Kannada litterateur who was nurtured and mentored by Rau.

As per Indian tradition, Rau's parents arranged a suitable match for him, and he was married in 1923 at the age of 20 to his 14-year-old first cousin Padmamma, daughter of his maternal uncle M. N. Krishna Rao. The marriage was entirely harmonious and conventional and lasted all their lives. They had four children, two sons and two daughters. The couple's elder son, N.S. Chandrasekhara, was a Senior Advocate, Littérateur and noted historian of princely Mysore. Their second son, N.S. Subbanna, retired as corporate vice-president of the Kirloskar Electric Company, Bangalore. Rau named his elder daughter Jayaseetha in honour of his beloved mother (Seethamma) and of the then Maharaja of Mysore, Jayachamaraja Wodeyar. She was married, in a match arranged by Rau in the traditional Indian way, to Dr. Visvanatha Premanand, a gentleman of their own community and similar social background. Dr. Premanand, a physicist, took his PhD from the Sorbonne in France and is a professor at the University of Minnesota. Rau's younger daughter, Lalita, worked as a teacher of the visually impaired for many years before she retired to spend time with her grandchildren. She was married to the world renowned physicist Prof. E. C. George Sudarshan.

== Education ==
Rau did his initial schooling in Kannada medium schools at Hosadurga, Challakere and Shimoga before enrolling in Central College, Bangalore, affiliated at that time to Madras University. He graduated with a Bachelor of Science and joined National High School, Bangalore as a teacher of Science and Mathematics. After a few years, he went back to studies, enrolled in Madras Law College, and took the degree of Bachelor of Law in 1927.

== Career ==
After completing his degree in law, Nittoor Srinivasa Rau returned to Bangalore and started his career as a lawyer. In 1952, he was chosen as the first chairman of the Mysore state Bar council. He was appointed the Advocate General of the Mysore state by the Chief Minister, Kengal Hanumanthaiah in 1953. He was elevated as judge of Karnataka High Court (then known as Mysore High Court) on 10 July 1955. He was appointed as Acting Chief Justice after retirement of chief justice R. Venakataramaiah in 1957. He was again appointed as acting chief justice on 14 August 1961 after retirement of chief justice S. R. Das Gupta and became permanent chief justice on 29 March 1962.

When the Prime Minister of India, Jawaharlal Nehru, started the Central Vigilance Commission of India in February 1964 to check corruption, he chose Nittoor Srinivasa Rau as the first Central Vigilance Commissioner of India.

== Public life ==
=== Freedom Movement ===
When he turned 18, Nittoor Srinivasa Rau joined the Indian National Congress. In the 1930s and 1940s, he participated in the Indian independence movement. He worked for the Mysore state unit of the Congress and actively participated in the Civil Disobedience Movement. In 1932, he also ran the Congress state unit office in Dharwad. During the Quit India Movement of 1942, he provided shelter to Congress leaders such as Kamaladevi Chattopadhyay, R. R. Diwakar, and U. S. Mallya.

=== Influence of Gandhi ===
In the early 1920s, he was influenced by the principles of Mahatma Gandhi, and when Gandhi visited Bangalore in 1927, Nittoor Srinivasa Rao took permission from him to translate his autobiography into Kannada. He and his wife assumed the title Ibbaru Kannadigaru and started translating the autobiography, which was then published in the form of a serial in the Kannada newspapers, Vishwa Karnataka and Lokmata. He named the translation as Satyashodhana (In pursuit of truth). To promote the Gandhian principles, he became the president of Karnataka Gandhi Smaaraka Nidhi (Karnataka Gandhi Memorial Trust) and Gandhi Peace Foundation. He also started a khadi unit to promote the use of khadi.

=== Literature ===
Nittoor Srinivasa Rau became a member of the Kannada Sahitya Parishat in 1922. When he realized the need of a publication to publish Kannada books, he started his own publishing house called Satyashodhana Prakatana Mandira (Satyashodhana Publication House) and an associated book store called Satyashodhana Pustaka Mandira. One of the important books published by him was Bala Prapancha, a collection of stories for children written by the renowned Shivaram Karanth. He also published the works of C. K. Venkataramaiya, Kuvempu, Gorur Ramaswamy Iyengar and G. P. Rajarathnam. Srinivasa Rau was also influenced by the Kannada writer, D. V. Gundappa and joined his social institute, The Gokhale Institute of Public Affairs. In 1975, he became an honorary secretary of the institute and continued in the post for sometime whereafter he bequeathed the post to eminent journalist, writer and social activist S. R. Ramaswamy. He also worked towards introducing Kannada as a medium of instruction in schools to educate a large population of students who may not know English.

== Later years ==
The Government of Karnataka honoured him by naming one of the prominent roads in Bangalore after his name. In 2002, he was also felicitated by the Government for his contribution to the field of literature and promotion of human values. He joined the Senior Citizens' Club in Bangalore, which was a forum started to look at the welfare of senior citizens. He was also interested in music, and was the President of the Percussive Arts Centre in Bangalore which was an organisation started to promote percussive arts. He passed 100 years in 2003, and died on 12 August 2004, 12 days short of his 101st birthday.

== See also ==
- C. K. Nagaraja Rao, Rao's nephew and protege.
