= Lothar Lutze =

Polish translator (1927–2015)

- Born: 7 September 1927; Breslau, Weimar Republic
- Died: 4 March 2015 (aged 87); Berlin, Germany
- Occupations: Scholar; writer; translator; Indologist
- Known for: Heidelberg Indology
- Awards: Padma Shri; Tagore Award; Dr. George Grierson Award

Lothar Lutze (7 September 1927 – 4 March 2015) was a German scholar, writer, translator and Indologist. He was the Emeritus Professor of the Department of Modern Languages and Literatures at the Heidelberg University. He is known for his research on Hindi literature and Indian culture, which prompted many to classify him under Heidelberg Indologists. He is a recipient of the Tagore Award and the Dr. George Grierson Award of the Central Hindi Directorate of the Government of India. The Government of India honored him again the fourth highest civilian award of the Padma Shri, in 2006, for his contributions to Indian literature.

== Biography ==
Lothar Lutze was born in Breslau, Weimar Republic (since 1945 Wrocław, Poland) on 7 September 1927. He was a professor at the South Asia Institute of the University of Heidelberg from 1965 to 1992 after which he served as the Emeritus Professor of the institute. He also headed the Delhi office of the institute during three separate periods. He is credited with several publications on South Asian literature, is regarded by many as a scholar on the South Asia culture. The Other Tagore (co-written by Alokeranjan Dasgupta), Hindi Writing in Post-colonial India, Zwölf Lektionen Hindi: Arbeitsheft Für Anfänger, Linguistic Prospects of the Emergence of an Internal Contact Language for India, Hindi as a Second Language: Patterns and Grammatical Notes, Zur Lyrik Alokeranjan Dasguptas, and Feldarbeit are some of his works. He also had several translations of Hindi works into German language to his credit.

Lutze was honored by the South Asia Institute at Goethe-Institut, New Delhi on 7 September 2007 on his 80th birthday where a symposium, A Tribute to Lothar Lutze - Beyond lived Literature, was organized. His life and work has been documented in a book, Tender Ironies: A Tribute to Lothar Lutze, published in 1994. The Government of India honored Lutze with the Tagore Award and the Central Hindi Directorate awarded him the Dr. George Grierson Award in 1994. In 2006, the government included him in the Republic Day Honours list for the civilian award of the Padma Shri for his contributions to Hindi literature.

Lutze died on 4 March 2015 at Berlin, at the age of 88.

== Selected work ==
- Lothar Lutze (1966). Zwölf Lektionen Hindi: Arbeitsheft Für Anfänger. Südasien-Inst. p. 44.
- Lothar Lutze (1967). Feldarbeit. Fietkau. p. 34.
- Lothar Lutze (1968). Linguistic Prospects of the Emergence of an Internal Contact Language for India. Südasien-Institut der Universität Heidelberg. p. 18.
- Lothar Lutze; Bahadur Singh (1970). Hindi as a Second Language: Patterns and Grammatical Notes. Rādhā Krishna Prakashan. p. 92.
- Lothar Lutze (1971). Zur Lyrik Alokeranjan Dasguptas. Südasien-Inst. d. Univ. Heidelberg. p. 6.
- Lothar Lutze (1985). Hindi Writing in Post-colonial India. Manohar Publications. p. 227. ISBN 9780836414226.
