= Kadhayallithu Jeevitham =

- Also known as: It's not a story, it's life
- Presented by: Vidhubala
- Country of origin: India
- Original language: Malayalam
- No. of episodes: 2000+

Production
- Camera setup: Multi-camera
- Running time: approx. 40–45 minutes per episode

Original release
- Network: Amrita TV
- Release: October 2010 – April 2020

Kadhayallithu Jeevitham (transl. Not a story, it's life) is an Indian Malayalam-language arbitration-based reality court show adjudicating real-life family disputes. Ran from 2010 to 2020, it aired on Amrita TV on weekdays. Actress and psychologist Vidhubala hosted the show. Vidhubala invites aggrieved families to put forth their disputes and concerns and helps settle the matters to the satisfaction of both the parties. It is adapted from the Tamil show Solvathellam Unmai by Lakshmy Ramakrishnan.

== Adaptations ==
Language	Title	Original release	Network(s)	Last aired	Notes
Tamil	Solvathellam Unmai	2 October 2009	Zee Tamil, Kalaignar TV	Ongoing	Original
Malayalam	Kadhayallithu Jeevitham	2 October 2010	Amrita TV	14 April 2020	Remake
Malayalam	Jeevitham Sakshi	22 August 2014	Kairali TV	2 February 2017	Remake
Kannada	Baduku Jataka Bandi	3 January 2011	Zee Kannada		Remake
Telugu	Bathuku Jataka Bandi	15 August 2013	Zee Telugu	24 July 2021	Remake
