= Centre for the Study of Developing Societies =

Delhi-based Indian research institute

Coordinates: 28.678°N 77.218°E

- Centre for the Study of Developing Societies (CSDS), Delhi
- Abbreviation: CSDS
- Formation: 1963
- Founder: Rajni Kothari
- Type: Autonomous government research institute
- Purpose: social sciences and humanities research
- Headquarters: 29 Rajpur Road, Civil Lines, Delhi - 110054
- Director: Awadhendra Sharan
- Main organ: Board of Governors
- Website: www.csds.in

The Centre for the Study of Developing Societies (CSDS) is an Indian research institute for social sciences and humanities located in New Delhi.

== History ==
The Centre for the Study of Developing Societies was founded in 1963 by Rajni Kothari. This was done using a grant of Rs 70,00 given to Kothari by Prof. Richard L. Park of the Asia Foundation, a CIA-backed cultural organization during the Cold War. It is largely funded by the Indian Council of Social Science Research (ICSSR). Kothari left his position as assistant director of the National Institute of Community Development in 1963 to establish the CSDS. It was housed initially in a building owned by the Indian Adult Education Association at Indraprastha Estate in Delhi. In 1966–1967 CSDS moved to its present location.

From December 2017 until March 2018, anthropologist and political scientist Mahmood Mamdani served as Rajni Kothari Chair Professor at the CSDS. After his term ended, on 4 April 2018 he delivered the annual Rajni Kothari Chair lecture, titled "Thinking of Justice through Africa's Experience in the 20th Century".

In August 2025, the ICSSR issued a show-cause notice to the CSDS, citing multiple administrative and financial irregularities and violations of grant-in-aid rules. The notice alleged that CSDS had released misleading election data related to the 2024 Maharashtra Legislative Assembly election and gave a biased interpretation of the ongoing Special Intensive Revision (SIR) in Bihar, allegedly aimed at "maligning the reputation and image" of the Election Commission of India (ECI). According to subsequent media reports, the ICSSR and other reviewing bodies flagged several additional concerns regarding the institute's functioning, including lack of auditing, data manipulation, and funding lapses.

== Location and description ==
CSDS is located in New Delhi, close to Delhi University.

Awadhendra Sharan is director of CSDS.

=== Library ===
The library at CSDS started with a few bookshelves in the basement of IAEA and grew into a fully-fledged one by 1970. It is meant primarily for research and higher learning in the field of social sciences and humanities. The collection consists of about 29,000 books and 5,000 bound volumes of journals and a modest set of reports and booklets. More than 130 journals are received regularly. Apart from works on contemporary themes, the library houses a collection of works on Asia and Africa, the arms race and peace movement, non-European perspectives, science studies, ecology and environment, and human rights. There is a separate collection of Hindi books covering a broad range of subjects including literature. The access to the collection has been computerised and the catalogue can be accessed through any computer in the centre. The CSDS library is a member of the Developing Libraries Network and the Social Science Libraries Network.

=== Data unit ===
The CSDS Data Unit, established in 1965, maintains an archive of survey data on political behaviour and attitudes, spanning over four decades. The unit also holds a number of secondary data sets, especially on elections in India.

== Programmes ==
Programmes operated by the centre include:

- Lokniti Programme for Comparative Democracy
- The Sarai Programme
- Indian Language Programme
