= Agni (1978 film) =

1978 film

- Directed by: C. Radhakrishnan
- Written by: C. Radhakrishnan
- Screenplay by: C. Radhakrishnan
- Produced by: Hassan; P. M. K. Bapu
- Starring: Madhu; Vidhubala; Sankaradi; Aboobacker
- Cinematography: U. Rajagopal
- Edited by: G. Venkittaraman
- Music by: A. T. Ummer
- Production company: Sheeba Arts
- Distributed by: Sheeba Arts
- Release date: 26 January 1978
- Country: India
- Language: Malayalam

Agni is a 1978 Indian Malayalam film, directed by C. Radhakrishnan and produced by Hassan and P. M. K. Bapu. The film stars Madhu, Vidhubala, Sankaradi and Aboobacker in the lead roles. The film's musical score is by A. T. Ummer.

== Cast ==
- Madhu
- Vidhubala
- Aboobacker
- Bahadoor
- Balan K. Nair

== Soundtrack ==
The music was composed by A. T. Ummer and the lyrics were written by Sakunthala Rajendran.

No.	Song	Singers	Lyrics	Length (m:ss)
1	"Kaattuparanje"	K. J. Yesudas	Sakunthala Rajendran	
2	"Mullappoomanam Veeshum"	S. Janaki, Chorus	Sakunthala Rajendran	
3	"Sulthante Kottarathil"	P. Susheela	Sakunthala Rajendran	
4	"Thonnan Pokkaru"	K. J. Yesudas	Sakunthala Rajendran	
