= Dr. George Grierson Award =

Dr. George Grierson Award डॉ जॉर्ज ग्रियर्सन पुरस्कार
- Award for promotion of the Hindi Language
- Awarded for: Literary award in India
- Sponsored by: Kendriya Hindi Sansthan, Government of India
- First award: 1994
- Final award: 2007

Highlights
- Total awarded: 15
- First winner: Dr. Lothar Lutze
- Website: www.hindisansthan.org/hi/awards/drgeorge_awards.html

The Dr. George Grierson Award (Devnagari: डॉ जॉर्ज ग्रियर्सन पुरस्कार) is a literary honor in India. It is conferred annually by Central Institute of Hindi, (Kendriya Hindi Sansthan), Ministry of Human Resource Development on writers of outstanding works in Hindi Literature. It is also a Hindi Sevi Samman and is given to number of Hindi experts for playing their important role in promoting the Hindi language abroad. It is awarded by the President Of India.

The award named after the linguist Dr. George Abraham Grierson was established by Kendriya Hindi Sansthan in 1989. The award carries Rs five lakh each, a citation and a shawl.

== Award recipients ==
Year	Name	Presenter	Country
1994	Prof. Dr. Lothar Lutze		Germany
1995	Dr. Maria Christopher Byrski		Poland
1996	Dr. Odolen Smékal		Czechoslovakia
1997	Dr. Rupert Snell		United Kingdom
1998	Shri. Abhimanyu Anat		Mauritius
1999	Pro. P.A Bashannikov प्रो. पी. ए. बाशननी्कोव		Russia
2000	Pro. Jin Ding Han		China
2001	Shri Naresh Bhartiya; Dr. Tomio Mizokami		India; Japan
2002	Dr. Maria Negyeshi		Hungary
2003	Prof. Toshio Tanaka		Japan
2004	Dr. Ronald Stuart McGregor		
2005	Prof. Dr. Indra Dassanayake	President of India, H.E. Pratibha Patil	Sri Lanka
2006	Pro. Mariola Offredi		Italy
2007	Pro. Danuta Stashik		Poland
2008	Pro. Herman Van Olphen		United States
2009	Pro. Jeong Ho Lee		South Korea
2010	Dr Shamtof Azad		Uzbekistan
2011	Dr Wu Jo Kim		South Korea
2012	Alka Dhanpat	Hon’ble President of India Sri Pranab Mukherjee	Mauritius
2013	Ge Fuping	Hon’ble President of India Sri Pranab Mukherjee	China
2014	Shichiro Soma	Hon’ble President of India Sri Pranab Mukherjee	Japan
2015	Fujii Takeshi		Japan
2015	Gabriela Nik Ilieva		US
2016	Satyadev Tengar		Mauritius
2016	Ziyang Zing Khwe		China
2018	Heinz Werner Wessler		Germany
2018	Sharangupt VeerSingh		Sri Lanka
