= Jin Dinghan =

Chinese translator (1930–2020)

- 金鼎汉
- Born: 13 September 1930; Changsha, Hunan, China
- Died: 28 November 2020 (aged 90); Beijing, China
- Education: Peking University
- Occupations: Translator, professor
- Relatives: Jin Yuereng (father); Jin Yuelin (uncle)
- Writing career
- Language: Chinese, Hindi
- Period: 1955–2020
- Genres: Novel, poetry
- Notable work: Ramacharitamanas
- Notable awards: Dr. George Grierson Prize (2000)

Jin Dinghan (simplified Chinese: 金鼎汉; traditional Chinese: 金鼎漢; pinyin: Jīn Dǐnghàn; 13 September 1930 – 28 November 2020) was a Chinese translator and professor.

He was one of the foremost translators of Hindi literature. For his contributions to the introduction of Hindi literature to foreign readers, he was honored with the World Hindi Language Honorary Award in 1993 and the Dr. George Grierson Award in 2000.

== Biography ==
Jin was born in a highly educated family in Changsha, Hunan in 1930, with his ancestral home in Zhuji, Zhejiang. His father, Jin Yuereng (金岳礽), who was a senior engineer; his uncle, Jin Yuelin, who was a Chinese philosopher; his brother, Jin Dingxin (金鼎新), was a member of the China Zhi Gong Party Central Committee.

Jin graduated from Peking University in 1955, where he majored in Hindi language, Jin taught there when graduated. At the same time, he served as a researcher in Chinese Academy of Social Sciences.

== Translation ==
- Ramacharitamanas (Goswami Tulasidas) (罗摩功行录)
- The Fact of False (Yashpal) (虚假的事实)
- Nirmala (Munshi Premchand) (妮摩拉)
- Selected Works of Mao Zedong (毛泽东选集)
- Poetry of Mao Zedong (毛泽东诗集)

== Awards ==
- 1993 World Hindi Language Honorary Award
- 2000 Dr. George Grierson Award
