= Munishree Nagraj =

Indian writer and poet

Munishree Nagraj is an Indian writer, poet in Hindi language. He won the Moortidevi Award in 1990.
