= C.P. Bhambri =

Indian political scientist (1933–2020)

- Born: 28 March 1933; Multan, India
- Died: 8 November 2020 (aged 87)
- Known for: Indian political process, Marxist analysis

Academic background
- Education: Agra University
- Thesis: Agra on Parliamentary Control over State Enterprise in India (1959)

C.P Bhambri was an Indian political scientist. He was the former dean of the School of Social Sciences, Jawaharlal Nehru University.

== Life ==
Chandra Prakash Bhambhri was born in Multan on 28 March 1933. After the India-Pakistan partition, he moved to Kanpur with his family. His wife is Krishna Bhambri. He died on 8 November 2020.

== Education ==
C.P Bhambri completed his bachelor's degree, Masters and PhD in political science from Agra University in 1951,1953 and 1959 respectively. His PhD thesis was on "Parliamentary Control over State Enterprise in India." He received Post-Doctoral Training in 1969-70 from Department of Policial Science, University of Michigan, Ann Arbor, USA.

== Career ==
C.P. Bhambri was one of the founding faculty members of the Centre for Political Studies (CPS), Jawaharlal Nehru University. He served as Chairperson of CPS for three terms and was also Dean of School of Social Sciences, Jawaharlal Nehru University from 1984 to 1986. Before being a faculty of JNU, he taught at the University of Rajasthan in Jaipur, Moradabad Degree College and Meerut College. Moreover, he authored 25 political science books.

He has been a visiting fellow in political science to several international universities, including Mcgill University, Montreal Canada from 1978 to 1979, Institute of Commonwealth Studies, London UK from January–February 1977, School of Oriental and African Studies, London from August–October 1980, Maison des Sciences, Paris, France in 1986 and 1994, Institute of Social Studies, The Hague, Netherlands in 1986, Aachen University, Germany 2003.

C.P. Bhambri is known for staunch secular and Marxist stance in academic writings. In the late 1960s and 1970s, when studies on Indian politics were dominated by reflections on the "dominance of one party" and the "Congress system", Bhambri made his signature in Indian academia by undertaking class analysis. He did not follow the behavioural approach or the structural-functional approach to explain power politics and political persuasion in Indian politics. This new perspective enabled the observers of Indian politics to look beyond personality clashes and understand the subsequent split within the Congress party as well as coalitions that emerged on the scene. Therefore, he often contested the ideas of professor Rajni Kothari, the founder of Centre for Study of Developing Societies, New Delhi. Bhambhri's Marxist critique of Kothari in the Indian Journal of Political Science is arguably considered as the first scholarly debate in the annals of Indian political science, famously bringing rival ideological perspectives to bear on the analysis of Indian politics. The imperialising propensities of modernisation theory however came to be widely acknowledged.

Bambri argued that while centrality of human labour enabled Marxists to understand history and explain the material dimensions of society. He however opposed caste based and community reservation theories, which according to him legitimized status quoist politics and impeded the move towards a progressive classless or casteless society. Bambri believed that "Political Science meant to unmask people in power."

== Key works ==
=== Books ===
Some of his notable works include:

Substance of Hindu Polity (1959), Politics in India, 1991-92 (1992), The Indian State, Fifty Years (1997), Politics in India, 1947-1987 (1988), Political Process in India, 1947-1991 (1991), BJP Led Government and Elections 1999 (2000), World Bank and India (1980), Bureaucracy and Politics in India (1971), Administration in a Changing Society (1972), Parliamentary Control Over State Enterprise in India (1960), Hindutva: A Challenge to Multi-cultural Democracy (2003), The Janata Party: A Profile (1980), The Indian State After Independence (2000), The Indian State Since Independence: 70 Years (2017), A Primer of Hindu Polity (1969), Public Administration: Theory and Practice (1963), Coalition Politics in India: First Decade of 21st Century (2010), The Indian State and Political Process (2007), Bharatiya Janata Party: Periphery To Centre (2001).

=== Journal articles ===
- Role of Paramilitary Forces in Centre-State Relations. Economic and Political Weekly. Vol. 13, Issue No. 17, 29 Apr, 1978.
- Revolutionary Armed Struggle in India. Economic and Political Weekly. Vol. 50, Issue No. 7, 14 Feb, 2015.
- United Front of the Oppressed. Economic and Political Weekly. Vol. 48, Issue No. 32, 10 Aug, 2013.

=== Other writings ===
- Super-Patriot Games. Outlook. 19 July 1999
- The Dalit question as answer to Hindutva. The Tribune. 31 January 2016
- Parivar's wish: Education for Hinduisation. The Tribune. 11 March 2016.
