= Abhimanyu Anat =

Mauritian writer

Abhimanyu Anat (born August 9, 1936) is a writer of Hindi fiction from Mauritius. He was born in Triolet village in the Northern Province of Mauritius. He taught Hindi for 18 years and was a drama instructor in the Department of Dramatic Arts in the Ministry of Youth for three years. He distinguished Mauritius on the stage of Hindi literature through his high-quality Hindi novels and stories. Abhimanyu Anat was born in a poor family. Due to financial difficulties, he could not get more formal education smoothly, but by his hard work, he gave proof of his writing skills by reading the works of famous writers. He is a conscious, committed and diligent writer. He has written his stories as a statement of his time. Undoubtedly, in the history of Hindi literature of Mauritius, his creation period will be recorded as 'Abhimanyu Anat Yug'. His collection of poems include "नागफनी में उलझी साँसें" and "गुलमोहर खौल उठा"

== Awards ==
Sri Abhimnayu Anat was conferred with Dr. George Grierson Award by Government of India in 1998.
