= A. R. Somanath Iyer =

Indian lawyer and jurist

Justice A. R. Somanath Iyer

4th Chief Justice of Mysore High Court
- In office 23 November 1969 – 29 December 1969
- Appointed by: V. V. Giri
- Preceded by: Nittoor Srinivasa Rau; H. Hombe Gowda (acting)
- Succeeded by: M. Sadasivayya

Judge of Mysore High Court
- In office 11 July 1957 – 22 November 1969; Acting CJ : 1 August 1969 - 22 November 1969
- Appointed by: Rajendra Prasad

Advocate General of Mysore
- In office 10 August 1950 – 1954
- Appointed by: Jayachamarajendra Wadiyar (Rajpramukh of Mysore)
- Chief Minister: Kengal Hanumanthaiah
- Preceded by: B. Vasudevamurthy
- Succeeded by: Nittoor Srinivasa Rau

Personal details
- Born: 30 December 1907
- Profession: Lawyer, Judge

Arni Ramasvami Somanath Iyer, (also written as A. R. Somnath Iyer) was an Indian lawyer and jurist who served as the Chief Justice of the Karnataka High Court.

He was appointed as judge of Mysore High Court on 11 July 1957 and later became its chief justice his tenure as Chief Justice was from 23 November 1969 to 29 December 1969. He was the Advocate-General of Karnataka from 1950 to 1954, and the acting Governor of Karnataka from 30 August 1969 to 23 October 1969.

== See also ==
- List of governors of Karnataka
