= Maria Christopher Byrski =

Rich career and numerous awards

Maria Christopher Byrski is a Polish diplomat, Indologist and Sanskrit scholar and Koodiyattam enthusiast. He was an Ambassador of Poland to India during 1993-96 and was awarded Padma Shri Award, one of the fourth highest civilian awards of India, by the Hon'ble President of India. Amb. Byrski has received the award for his contribution in the field of Literature and Education. He is a recipient of Dr. George Grierson Award of the Central Hindi Directorate of the Government of India in 1995. He has written more than 100 essays on Ancient India's Drama.

Byrski had his first tryst with India in 1955, when he was a student of Indian Studies at the University of Warsaw. His fascination for Natyashastra, the ancient text on dramaturgy, brought him to Banaras Hindu University (BHU), where he earned a doctorate with a thesis titled ‘Concept of Ancient Indian Theatre’. While doing his research, he became fascinated by Koodiyattam, the only surviving Sanskrit theatre.
