= Vaazhthu Kaatuvom =

- Also known as: Let's live and show / வாழ்ந்து காட்டுவோம்
- Genre: Social Drama
- Based on: Solvathellam Unmai
- Presented by: Kuyili
- Country of origin: India
- Original language: Tamil
- No. of seasons: 1
- No. of episodes: 100

Production
- Camera setup: Multi-camera
- Running time: approx. 35–45 minutes per episode
- Production company: Crucible Innovations

Original release
- Network: Kalaignar TV
- Release: 26 February – 21 June 2024

Related
- Solvathellam Unmai

Vaazhthu Kaatuvom (transl. Let's live and show) is a 2024 Indian Tamil-language reality arbitration-based reality court show adjudicating real-life family disputes. It is adapted from the Zee Tamil's show Solvathellam Unmai. This program has been developed in a brand new format with the advice of experts and specialists in a new arena where people's grievances and problems are spoken boldly.

Actress Kuyili hosts the show. It aired on Kalaignar TV from 26 February 2024 to 21 June 2024 on Monday to Friday from 21:00 and is also presented on Kalaignar TV's YouTube channel.
