= C. K. Nagaraja Rao =

Indian writer (1915–1998)

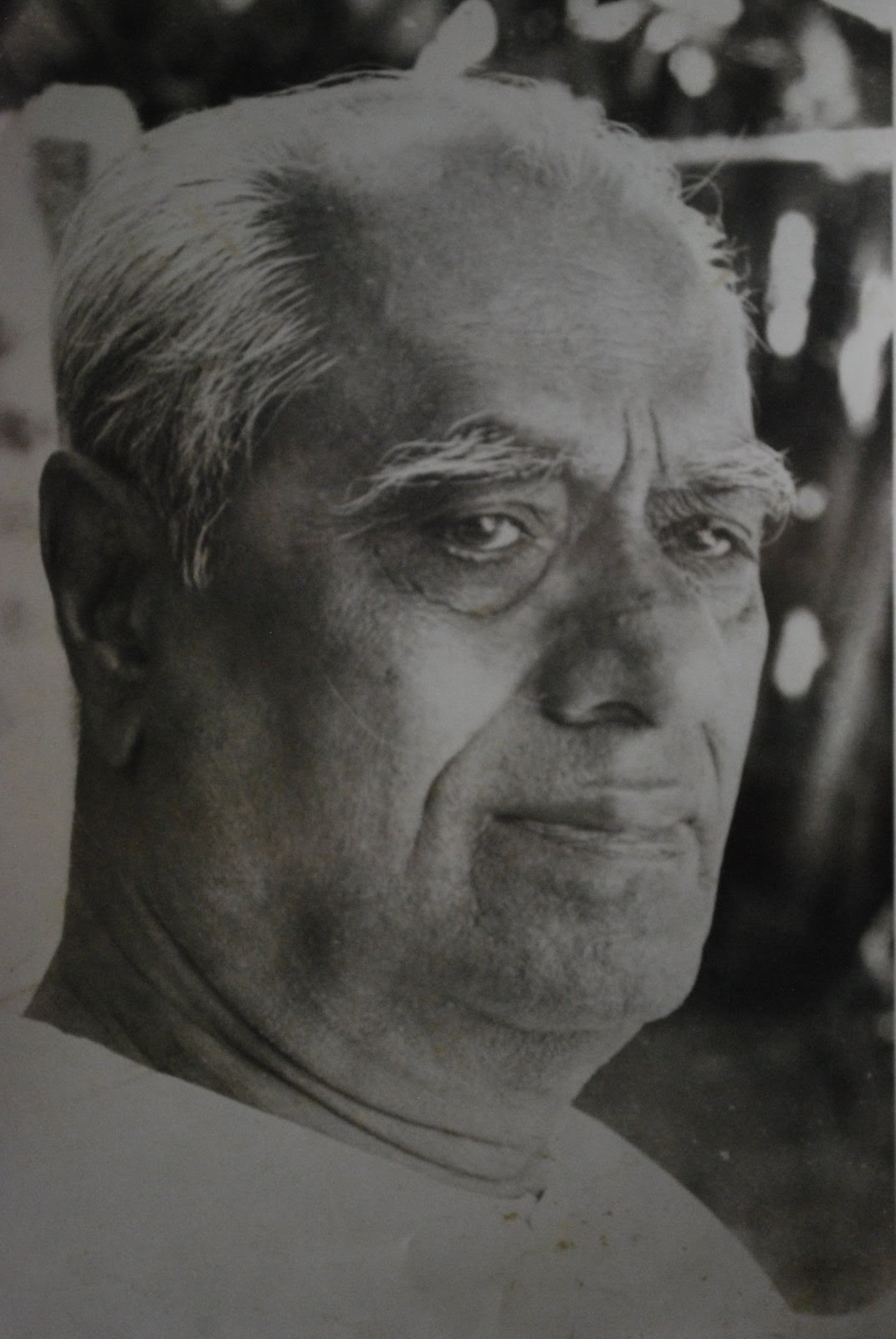
- Born: 12 June 1915; Challakere, Chitradurga district, Karnataka, British India
- Died: 10 April 1998 (aged 82); Bangalore, Karnataka, India
- Occupations: Writer, social activist, stage actor & director
- Writing career
- Genres: Historical fiction, research

Challakere Krishnamurthy Rao Nagaraja Rao (12 June 1915 – 10 April 1998) was an Indian writer, dramatist, stage artist, director, journalist and social activist, who wrote in Kannada.

He was the first recipient of the Moortidevi Award instituted by Bharatiya Jnanpith for his magnum opus "Pattamahadevi Shantaladevi" in 1983. The same work received "Best Creative Literary Work" award by the Karnataka Sahitya Academy in 1978.

== Early life ==
C.K. Nagaraja Rao was born on 12 June 1915 in Challakere, Chitradurga district to C.S. Krishnamurthy Rao and Smt. Puttamma. His childhood was spent in various cities around India and he developed a keen interest in the rich art and cultural heritage of Karnataka, India.

As a school boy, he volunteered to waited upon Mahatma Gandhi during his stay at Nandi Hills near Bangalore, India. The interaction with Gandhi and his close association with his uncle, Justice Nittoor Srinivasa Rao, instilled in him devotion for India's freedom and welfare of its needy people. Rao's literary career began when he won a school competition for his short story "Kaadu Mallige" about a Dalit music lover who was not allowed to sit with patrons from the upper castes during concerts.

He worked with Satya Shodhana Pustaka Bhandara, a Kannada book printer and publisher whose motto was the promotion of the rich cultural heritage of Karnataka. Under the guidance of his uncle Justice Nittor Srinivasa Rao, C.K. Nagaraja Rao had the opportunity to mingle with leading writers and literati of Karnataka. After a few years of work at Satya Shodhana, he took over responsibilities as secretary of the Kannada Sahitya Parishath and worked with influential writers like Masti Venkatesha Iyengar, B. M. Srikantaiah and others which further strengthened his resolve to delve deeper into the heritage of Karnataka.

== Research: history and culture of Karnataka ==
The extensive research by C.K. Nagaraja Rao led to his publishing many research papers. Amongst his earliest research works was a book titled “Kavi Lakshmeeshana Kaala Mattu Sthala”, on the celebrated Kannada poet Lakshmeesha. The book won an award from the Karnataka Sahitya Academy for the research content. He also authored many research papers on the Chalukya, Ganga and Hoysala dynasties which were published in the journals of the Mythic Society and other journals and newspapers like Vani, Samyukta Karnataka, Praja Vaani etc.

== Historical novels ==
His research into the Hoysala period, regarded as one of the golden periods in the history of Karnataka, led to the unearthing of stone inscriptions that shed light into the motherhood of Hoysala Queen Shantaladevi, thus debunking the myth that she committed suicide for being childless. Through his research he was able to establish that Queen Shantaladevi was the mother of three sons and a daughter. In the year 1977, he self -published his magnum opus "Pattamahadevi Shantaladevi", a historical novel spanning 2162 pages. This work was hailed as "Gadya Mahakavya" by historians, critics and readers alike. Sri M.V. Kamat, the editor of Illustrated weekly of India lauded the novel as the biggest literary work ever published. The Hindi translation of this novel translated by Sri P. Venkatachala Sharma and published by Bharatiya Jnanapith has been well received.

C.K. Nagaraja Rao wrote two additional novels "Veeraganga Vishnuvardhana" and "Dayada Daavanala?" that further chronicle the history and times of the Hoysala dynasty. These novels record the history through hundreds of characters, many historical, and some imaginary to strengthen the narration. He penned "Sri Pruthvi Vallabha", covering the Chalukya dynasty and the period of their famous King Tailapa.

== Theatre and radio plays ==
He formed his own troupe called United Artists in Bangalore. He directed plays of well-known Kannada playwrights like T.P. Kailasam, Kuppali Venkatappagowda Puttappa and others. He developed his own style of makeup for theatre artists and was recognised as one of the best make-up artists of his times. He was closely associated with All India Radio Bangalore as an actor and producer of radio plays.

== Other activities ==
- C.K. Nagaraja Rao was closely associated with the Mythic Society and worked as its chief executive and editor of its journal.
- He also founded Karnataka Lekhakara Sangha and worked as its president for over three decades.
- He initiated many youngsters into creative writing by conducting monthly poet meet-ups called "Kaavyarama".
- He was closely involved in social activities as an active member of the Rotary Club of Bangalore. He was also editor of the journal of the Rotary Club for many years.
- He helped organise festivals such as Hoysalotsava and Gangasamrajyotsava and actively participated in the Chalukyotsava at Badami.
- He worked as the President of Jayanagar Housing Co-operation Society for many years.
- He served as the First Vice-Principal of Adarsha Film Institute.
- He was a member of P.E.N, a worldwide association of writers.

== Published works ==
=== Collection of stories ===
- 1937 Kadumallige
- 1944 Sangama
- 1956 Drushti Mathana
- 1982 Saavilladavaru

=== Plays ===
- 1943 Shoodramuni
- 1979 Sampanna Samaja
- 1979 Sankole Basava
- 1988 Ekalavya (Hindi)

=== Novels ===
- 1957 Nambida Jeeva
- 1978 Pattamahadevi Shantaladevi
- 1992 Veeraganga Vishnuvardhana
- 1994 Daayaada Daavaanala?
- 1983 Kuranganayani
- 1995 ShriPruthvivallabha

=== Translations ===
- 1938 Premayogini
- 1940 Darpachoorna
- 1941 ArakshaNeeya
- 1946 Kaashinaatha
- 1957 Vishweshwari
- 1958 Mantradeekshe
- 1959 Nanna Nechhina Naade
- 1979 Thathamaavana Kanasu
- 1970 Cambodia-Laos

=== Other works ===
- 1942 Naayikode
- 1950 Ekalavya Darshana
- 1969 Mahakavi Lakshmeeshana Sthala Mattu Kaala
