= Ottayadipathakal =

- Directed by: C. Radhakrishnan
- Written by: C. Radhakrishnan
- Screenplay by: C. Radhakrishnan
- Produced by: Vincent Chittilappally
- Starring: Madhu; Revathy; Sreenath; Kaviyoor Ponnamma
- Cinematography: Sunny Joseph
- Edited by: Venugopal
- Music by: Mohan Sithara
- Production company: St. Vincent Movies
- Distributed by: St. Vincent Movies
- Release date: 1993
- Country: India
- Language: Malayalam

Ottayadipathakal is a 1993 Indian Malayalam-language film, directed by C. Radhakrishnan and produced by Vincent Chittilappally. The film stars Madhu, Revathy, Sreenath and Kaviyoor Ponnamma. The film has musical score by Mohan Sithara.

== Cast ==
- Madhu
- Revathy as Sathi
- Sreenath as Anoop
- Kaviyoor Ponnamma
- M. Chandran Nair
- Isaac Thomas
- Nimisha Suresh
- K. M. A. Raheem

== Soundtrack ==
The music was composed by Mohan Sithara.

No.	Song	Singers	Lyrics	Length (m:ss)
1	"Geethopadesham"	P. Jayachandran	Traditional	
2	"Kaattum Kadalum"	Arundhathi	O. N. V. Kurup	
3	"Vellathil Aambalunde"	Nalini Balakrishnan	C. Radhakrishnan	
