= Pinnilavu =

- Film poster
- Directed by: P. G. Viswambharan
- Screenplay by: Thoppil Bhasi
- Story by: C. Radhakrishnan
- Produced by: Raju Mathew
- Starring: Madhu; Srividya; Mammootty; Mohanlal; Poornima Bhagyaraj; M G Soman
- Cinematography: Ramachandra Babu
- Edited by: G. Venkitaraman
- Music by: Ilaiyaraaja
- Production company: Century Films
- Release date: 24 June 1983
- Country: India
- Language: Malayalam

Pinnilavu is a 1983 Indian Malayalam-language drama film directed by P. G. Viswambharan and written by Thoppil Bhasi, based on the story of the same name by C. Radhakrishnan. It stars Madhu, Srividya, Mammootty, Mohanlal, Poornima Bhagyaraj, M G Soman, Mukesh, Maniyan Pillai Raju, and Sukumari. The music was composed by Ilaiyaraaja. The film is about a fight of ethics between a father and son.

== Cast ==
- Mammootty as Govindhananunni a.k.a. Unni
- Poornima Jayaram as Parvathi, Unni's cousin and lover
- Madhu as Kesava Panikkar
- Srividya as Sreedevi
- Mohanlal as Raghu, Pillai's son
- M. G. Soman as Doctor Gopi
- Mucherla Aruna as Gopi's Lover
- Maniyanpilla Raju as Sreedharan
- Mukesh as Sabu
- Vijayaraghavan as Wilson
- Santhosh as Basheer
- Sukumari as Saraswathi, Parvathi's mother
- Adoor Bhasi as Padmanabha Pillai

== Songs ==
There are three songs in the film with lyrics by poet Yusuf Ali Kechery and music scored by Ilaiyaraaja.

1. "Maane Madhurakkarimbe" — K. J. Yesudas
2. "Nishaamanoharee " — K. J. Yesudas, P Jaychandran, S. Janaki
3. "Priyane Uyir Neeye " — K. J. Yesudas, S. Janaki
