= C. Radhakrishnan =

Indian writer, physicist and film director (born 1939)

- Born: Chakkupurayil Radhakrishnan; 15 February 1939 (age 87); Chamravattam, Tirur, Malabar District, Madras Presidency, British India (present day Malappuram, Kerala, India)
- Education: Zamorin's College, Calicut; Government Victoria College, Palakkad
- Occupations: Novelist; Short story writer; Film director; Journalist; Physicist
- Writing career
- Notable works: Nizhalppadukal (1962); Spandamapinikale Nandi (1986); Theekkadal Kadanhu Thirumadhuram (2005)
- Notable awards: Ezhuthachan Puraskaram (2016); Moortidevi Award (2013); Sahitya Akademi Award (1988); Kerala Sahitya Akademi Award (1962)
- Website: c-radhakrishnan.info

C. Radhakrishnan (born 15 February 1939) is an Indian novelist, short story writer, film director and physicist who writes in Malayalam. He is one of the most widely read Malayalam writers of the twentieth and twenty-first centuries, and has received nearly every major literary recognition in Kerala, including the Ezhuthachan Puraskaram, the Moortidevi Award of the Bharatiya Jnanpith, and the Sahitya Akademi Award. In 2022, he became only the second Malayalam writer, after M. T. Vasudevan Nair, to be named Eminent Member by the Sahitya Akademi.

== Life ==
=== Early life and education ===
Chakkupurayil Radhakrishnan was born on 15 February 1939 in Chamravattam (a village in Tirur) in Malappuram district, which was then a part of the Madras Presidency of British India, to Parappur Madathil Madhavan Nair — a veteran freedom fighter — and Chakkupurayil Janaki Amma. He heard from his grandparents that Thunchaththu Ezhuthachan was an ancestor in his lineage; this family tradition later provided the basis for his biographical novel on Ezhuthachan titled Theekkadal Kadanhu Thirumadhuram.

He completed his secondary schooling at Achutha Varier High School, Ponnani, where he won the Best Student Gold Medal. He then attended Zamorin's College, Calicut, winning the Madras University Sharpe Scholarship at the intermediate level and a top-rank gold medal on graduating with a degree in physics. He subsequently enrolled for a postgraduate degree in applied physics at Government Victoria College, Palakkad, though he did not complete the programme.

=== Career in science and journalism ===
Radhakrishnan began his professional career as a Scientific Assistant at the Astrophysical Observatory, Kodaikanal, in 1960. He then served as Officer-in-Charge of the World-Wide Seismology Centre, Pune, under the Indian Meteorological Department from 1962 to 1964.

In 1964 he joined the launch team of Science Today, the popular science monthly of the Times of India, Bombay, and is credited with helping establish it as India's first successful popular science magazine. He subsequently worked as Science Editor of Link magazine and the Patriot daily in Delhi from 1968 to 1972. On returning to Kerala he edited Porul monthly (1972–76) and later Veekshanam daily (1980–84). He served as Editor-in-Charge of the yearbooks and Bhashaposhini supplement at Malayala Manorama from 1994 to 1997, and as Design and Packaging Consultant for Madhyamam Publications from 1997 to 2000. He was the chief editor of Madhyamam Daily from 16 August 1999 to 1 September 2001. He also edited the Malayalam magazine Piravi published by the School of Bhagavad Gita.

=== Literary career ===
Radhakrishnan wrote his first novel Nizhalppadukal at the age of nineteen, topping 120 entries in a novel-writing competition organised by the Mathrubhumi Weekly. The work was serialised in the magazine and later published by Current Books in 1962, winning the Kerala Sahitya Akademi Award that year.

His 1986 novel Spandamapinikale Nandi (Thank You, Seismographs) received the Sahitya Akademi Award for Malayalam in 1988. In July 2014 he was awarded the Moortidevi Award for the year 2013 for his biographical novel Theekkadal Kadanhu Thirumadhuram. He was conferred the Ezhuthachan Puraskaram for the year 2016.

Other literary recognitions include the Mathrubhumi Literary Award (2015), the K. P. Kesava Menon Memorial Award (2016), the Vayalar Award (1990), the Madhava Mudra, the Nalappadan Award (2016) from the Nalappadan Memorial Cultural Society for holistic contributions to Malayalam literature, and the Thrikkavu Devi Puraskaram.

Radhakrishnan has been a member of the General Council of the Sahitya Akademi, New Delhi, served as Chairperson of its Malayalam Advisory Board and as a member of its Executive Council. He was twice elected to the Board of Directors of the Writers' Co-operative of Kerala, heading the Board for one term. He served on the jury panel of the National Film Awards on three occasions and was twice a member of the jury to select Indian Panorama films. He was a member of the first Board of Directors of the Kerala State Film Development Corporation.

=== Novel Navakam ===
Between 1972 and 1997, Radhakrishnan wrote a sequence of nine interconnected novels collectively known as the Novel Navakam (Novel Nonet). The series is structured as a trilogy of trilogies, with the three groups addressing Kerala, India, and the wider world respectively. In order, the nine novels are: Ellam Maykkunna Kadal (1972), Puzha Muthal Puzha Vare (1974), Pullipulikalum Vellinakshatrangalum (1984), Spandamapinikale Nandi (1986), Ivide Ellavarkkum Sukham Thanne (1988), Verpadukalude Viralpadukal (1992), Munpe Parakkunna Pakshikal (1989), Karal Pilarum Kalam (1994), and Iniyoru Nirakanchiri (1997).

=== Film career ===
Radhakrishnan directed four Malayalam feature films. His debut, Agni (1978), based on his own 1963 novella, was the first film from South India to be included in the Indian Panorama of feature films and was screened at international festivals including Mannheim, Istanbul, Moscow and Locarno. His third directorial work, Ottayadipathakal (1993), also formed part of the Indian Panorama and received critical acclaim at the Mannheim and Tashkent festivals.

He also wrote the story for several films based on his own novels, including Priya (1975, based on Thevidissi), Pin Nilavu (1983), and Avidathepole Ivideyum (1985).

=== Interest in physics and cosmology ===
Alongside his literary career, Radhakrishnan has maintained a long-standing personal interest in theoretical physics, rooted in his background as a trained physicist. He formulated a speculative cosmological framework he called the "Fabric of Space," and in 1988 circulated a privately published monograph titled Unity of Space–Matter Manifestations to researchers in the field. A popular-science book elaborating these ideas, Stuff and Style of the Universe, was published in 2002, and a further volume, The Secret Behind the Universe (co-authored with his son Dr. Gopal K. R.), appeared in 2016. A condensed version of the framework appeared in 2017 in the Prespacetime Journal, a niche open-access publication. These works have not been reviewed or cited in mainstream physics literature.

== Bibliography ==
=== Novel ===
Year	Title	Publisher	Notes	Ref.
1962	Nizhalppadukal (നിഴൽപ്പാടുകൾ) (Patches of Shade)	Thrissur: Current Books, 1962; Cochin: Hi Tech Books, 2013	First published work Also included in the collection Kannivila (1995); Translated into English as Patches of Shade (1987); Translated into French as Fragments D' Ombre (Pondicherry: Kailash, 1998)	
1963	Agni (അഗ്നി) (Fire)	Thrissur: Current Books, 1963; Calicut: Poorna, 1982	Adapted into a film of the same name (1978); Also included in the collection Mrutyor Maa (1998); Translated into English as Agni (2013)	
1963	Kannimangakal (കണ്ണിമാങ്ങകൾ) (Tender Mangos)	Cochin: CICC, 1963; Kottayam: Current Books, 1982; Calicut: Lipi Publications, 2009	Also included in the collection Griharthuram (2005)	
1963	Kanalthullikal (കാനൽത്തുള്ളികൾ)	Trivandrum: Neruda, 1963; Trivandrum: Chintha, 2016	Also included in the collection Mathruparvam (2003)	
1963	Ugramoorthikal, Driksakshi Viplavangalum (ഉഗ്രമൂർത്തികൾ, ദൃക്‌സാക്ഷി വിപ്ലവങ്ങളും)	Thrissur: Current Books, 1963; Kottayam: NBS, 1993		
1966	Mareechika (മരീചിക) (The Mirage)	Kottayam: SPCS	Also included in the collection Kannivila (1995)	
1966	Mrinalam (മൃണാളം)	Trivandrum: Desabandhu, 1984; Kannur: New Books, 2016	Also included in the collection Mathruparvam (2003)	
1967	Thevidissi (തേവിടിശ്ശി) (Prostitute)	Thrissur: Mangalodayam, 1967; Kottayam: SPCS, 1973; Kollam: Saindhava Books, 2016	Adapted into the 1975 film Priya; Also included in the collection Thamaso Maa (1998)	
1967	Chuzhali (ചുഴലി) (Whirlwind)	Thrissur: Current Books, 1967; Kottayam: Grand Books, 2010	Also included in the collection Mathruparvam (2003)	
1967	Verukal Padarunna Vazhikal (വേരുകൾ പടരുന്ന വഴികൾ)	Trivandrum: Desabandhu, 1983; Kannur: New Books, 2016	Also included in the collection Mathruparvam (2003)	
1967	Nilavu (നിലാവ്) (Moonlight)	Thrissur: Current Books	Also included in the collection Thamaso Maa (1998)	
1968	Yudham (യുദ്ധം) (War)	Thrissur: Mangalodayam	Also included in the collection Mrutyor Maa (1998)	
1968	Veshangal (വേഷങ്ങൾ) (Costumes)	Thrissur: Mangalodayam	Satirical novel Also included in the collection Ithihasam (1998)	
1969	Driksakshi (ദൃക്‌സാക്ഷി) (Witness)	Thrissur: Current Books	Novelette; Also included in the collection Amritham (1994)	
1969	Anthardhara (അന്തർധാര)	Kottayam: SPCS		
1970	Poojyam (പൂജ്യം) (Zero)	Thrissur: Current Books	Also included in the collection Mrutyor Maa (1998); Translated into English as Zero (1974)	
1970	Idukuthozhuthu (ഇടുക്കുതൊഴുത്ത്)	Cochin: CICC, 1970; Kottayam: Current Books, 1985	Also included in the collection Asatho Maa (1998)	
1970	Ulpirivukal (ഉൾപ്പിരിവുകൾ)	Kottayam: SPCS, 1970; Kottayam: Current Books, 1985	Also included in the collection Asatho Maa (1998)	
1972	Ellam Maykkunna Kadal (എല്ലാം മായ്ക്കുന്ന കടൽ) (The Ocean That Wipes Out All)	Kottayam: SPCS	First novel in the Novel Navakam series	
1973	Kurekkoodi Madangivarathavar (കുറേക്കൂടി മടങ്ങിവരാത്തവർ)	Thrissur: Current Books	Also included in the collection Asatho Maa (1998)	
1974	Puzha Muthal Puzha Vare (പുഴ മുതൽ പുഴ വരെ) (From the River and Back to It)	Kottayam: SPCS, 1974; Cochin: Hi Tech Books, 2003	Second novel in the Novel Navakam series	
1977	Tharanisha (താരനിശ)	Kottayam: SPCS	Also included in the collection Griharthuram (2005)	
1977	Preyassi (പ്രേയസ്സി)	Kottayam: Priyamvada		
1979	Kankalikal (കങ്കാളികൾ)	Kottayam: SPCS, 1979; Kottayam: Current Books, 1985; Calicut: Olive, 2018	Also included in the collection Thamaso Maa (1998)	
1981	Ival Avariloruval (ഇവൾ അവരിലൊരുവൾ)	Konni: Venus Book Depot, 1981; Kannur: New Books, 2017	Also included in the collection Thamaso Maa (1998)	
1982	Ottayadipathakal (ഒറ്റയടിപ്പാതകൾ)	Calicut: Poorna	Adapted into a film of the same name (1993); Also included in the collection Mrutyor Maa (1998)	
1982	Sruthi (ശ്രുതി)	Calicut: Poorna	Also included in the collection Thamaso Maa (1998)	
1982	Kaivazhikal (കൈവഴികൾ)	Konni: Venus Book Depot	Also included in the collection Asatho Maa (1998)	
1982	Pin Nilavu (പിൻനിലാവ്)	Kottayam: DC Books	Adapted into a film of the same name (1983); Also included in the collection Asatho Maa (1998)	
1983	Kalippattangal (കളിപ്പാട്ടങ്ങൾ)	Kottayam: DC Books	Satirical novel Also included in the collection Ithihasam (1998)	
1984	Pullipulikalum Vellinakshatrangalum (പുള്ളിപ്പുലികളും വെള്ളിനക്ഷത്രങ്ങളും) (Spotted Leopards And Silvery Stars)	Kottayam: SPCS, 1984; Cochin: Hi Tech Books, 2012	Third novel in the Novel Navakam series With an introduction by N. V. Krishna Warrier	
1985	Thayveru (തായ്‌വേര്)	Moovattupuzha: Victory, 1985; Trivandrum: Chintha, 2017	Also included in the collection Griharthuram (2005)	
1986	Sahadharmini (സഹധർമിണി)	Moovattupuzha: Victory, 1986; Calicut: Haritham Books, 2016	Also included in the collection Griharthuram (2005)	
1986	Bruhadaranyakam (ബൃഹദാരണ്യകം)	Kottayam: SPCS, 1986; Calicut: Poorna, 1999	Also included in the collection Mrutyor Maa (1998); With an introduction by K. M. Tharakan	
1986	Spandamapinikale Nandi (സ്പന്ദമാപിനികളെ നന്ദി) (Thank You, Seismographs)	Kottayam: SPCS, 1986; Cochin: Hi Tech Books	Fourth novel in the Novel Navakam series Sahitya Akademi Award winner, 1988; With an introduction by M. Leelavathy; Translated into English as Maybe Another Day (1993); Translated into Tamil as Nile Adirvumaanikale Nanri (New Delhi: Sahitya Akademi)	
1987	Oru Vilippaadakale (ഒരു വിളിപ്പാടകലെ)	Trivandrum: Prabhath Book House, 2001; Calicut: Haritham Books, 2016	Novelette; Also included in the collection Amritham (1994)	
1988	Maranasiksha (മരണശിക്ഷ)	Kottayam: DC Books	With an introduction by Koduppunna	
1988	Ivide Ellavarkkum Sukham Thanne (ഇവിടെ എല്ലാവർക്കും സുഖം തന്നെ) (We Are All Fine Here)	Cochin: Hi Tech Books	Fifth novel in the Novel Navakam series	
1989	Munpe Parakkunna Pakshikal (മുൻപേ പറക്കുന്ന പക്ഷികൾ) (Birds That Fly Ahead)	Kottayam: SPCS, 1989; Cochin: Hi Tech Books	Seventh novel in the Novel Navakam series Translated into English as Birds That Fly Ahead (2015)	
1990	Athirukal Kadakkunnavar (അതിരുകൾ കടക്കുന്നവർ)	Kottayam: DC Books, 1990; Chunakkara: Jeevan Publishers, 2003; Kannur: New Books, 2015	Also included in the collection Asatho Maa (1998)	
1992	Verpadukalude Viralpadukal (വേർപാടുകളുടെ വിരൽപ്പാടുകൾ) (Imprints Of Separation)	Kottayam: SPCS, 1992; Cochin: Hi Tech Books, 1994	Sixth novel in the Novel Navakam series	
1993	Control Panel (കൺട്രോൾ പാനൽ)	Kottayam: SPCS, 1993; Calicut: Haritham Books, 2016	Novelette; Also included in the collection Amritham (1994)	
1994	Aazhangalil Amritham (ആഴങ്ങളിൽ അമൃതം)	—	Novelette; Also included in the collection Amritham (1994)	
1994	Cassioppiyakkaran Noyel Castelino (കാസ്സിയോപ്പിയാക്കാരൻ നോയേൽ കാസ്റ്റെലിനൊ)	—	Novelette; Also included in the collection Amritham (1994)	
1994	Karal Pilarum Kalam (കരൾ പിളരും കാലം) (Heart-rending Times)	Cochin: Hi Tech Books	Eighth novel in the Novel Navakam series With an introduction by M. Thomas Mathew; Translated into English as Heart-rending Times (2015)	
1997	Iniyoru Nirakanchiri (ഇനിയൊരു നിറകൺചിരി) (Now for a Tearful Smile)	Cochin: Hi Tech Books	Ninth and final novel in the Novel Navakam series Translated into English as Now for a Tearful Smile (2015)	
1998	Kalikalavasthakal (കലികാലാവസ്ഥകൾ)	Kottayam: DC Books	Satirical novel Also included in the collection Ithihasam (1998)	
2002	Ullil Ullathu (ഉള്ളിൽ ഉള്ളത്) (Deep Within)	Cochin: Hi Tech Books	Science fiction novel Translated into English as Deep Within (2018)	
2005	Theekadal Kadanhu Thirumadhuram (തീക്കടൽ കടഞ്ഞ് തിരുമധുരം) (Churning a Sea of Fire)	Cochin: Hi Tech Books	Biographic novel based on the life of Ezhuthachan; Moortidevi Award (2013); Translated into Hindi as Agnisagar Se Amrut (New Delhi: Bharatiya Jnanpith, 2017); Translated into English as Nectar from Sea of Fire	
2005	Ivide Polikkunnathellam Lelavilpanakku (ഇവിടെ പൊളിക്കുന്നതെല്ലാം ലേലവില്പനയ്ക്ക്)	Calicut: Haritham Books		
2010	Sukrutham (സുകൃതം)	Trivandrum: Chintha Publishers		
2019	Oru Mayajalam Pole (ഒരു മായാജാലം പോലെ)	Calicut: Mathrubhumi Books		
2022	Kaalam Kaathuvekkunnathu (കാലം കാത്തുവെക്കുന്നത്)	Calicut: Mathrubhumi Books		

=== Story ===
Year	Title	Publisher	Notes	Ref.
1967	Ghoshayathra (ഘോഷയാത്ര) (Procession)	Calicut: Poorna	Collection of 7 stories	
1975	Karadi (കരടി) (Bear)	Kottayam: SPCS	Collection of 12 stories	
1986	Kudiyozhikkal (കുടിയൊഴിക്കൽ)	Kottayam: NBS	With an introduction by Sukumar Azhikode	
1987	Akashathil Oru Vidavu (ആകാശത്തിൽ ഒരു വിടവ്)	Trivandrum: Prabhatham		
1988	Unarum Vare (ഉണരും വരെ)	Kottayam: NBS		
1991	Thachanar (തച്ചനാർ)	Trivandrum: Prabhath Book House, 1991; Trivandrum: Bala Sahitya Institute, 2009	Collection of 6 stories	
1996	Thiranjedutha Kathakal (തിരഞ്ഞെടുത്ത കഥകൾ)	Cochin: Hi Tech Books		
2003	Mayayude Karyam (മായയുടെ കാര്യം)	Trivandrum: Prabhath Book House		
2011	Mritasanjeevani (മൃതസഞ്ജീവനി)	Calicut: Lipi Publications	Collection of 20 stories	
2014	Ammathottil (അമ്മത്തൊട്ടിൽ)	Kottayam: DC Books		
2014	C. Radhakrishnante Kathakal (സി.രാധാകൃഷ്ണന്റെ കഥകൾ)	Kottayam: DC Books		
2020	Kathakal Sampoornam (കഥകൾ സമ്പൂർണം)	Cochin: Hi Tech Books	Complete stories in two volumes	

=== Poetry ===
Year	Title	Publisher	Notes	Ref.
1967	Ottayan Alarunnu (ഒറ്റയാൻ അലറുന്നു)	Thrissur: Mangalodayam	Also included in the collection Nadakantham (2000)	
1988	Sudarsanam (സുദർശനം)	—	Also included in the collection Nadakantham (2000)	

=== Drama ===
Year	Title	Publisher	Notes	Ref.
1963	Ithikkannikal (ഇത്തിക്കണ്ണികൾ)	Cochin: CICC	Also included in the collection Nadakantham (2000)	
1966	Nayattu (നായാട്ട്)	Thrissur: Current Books	Also included in the collection Nadakantham (2000)	
1966	Valiya Lokangal, Cheriya Mathilukal (വലിയ ലോകങ്ങൾ, ചെറിയ മതിലുകൾ)	Thrissur: Current Books	Also included in the collection Nadakantham (2000) under the title Mathilukal	
1967	Dweepu (ദ്വീപ്)	Thrissur: Current Books	Also included in the collection Nadakantham (2000)	

=== Children's literature ===
Year	Title	Publisher	Notes	Ref.
2007	Eppozhum, Evideyum (എപ്പോഴും, എവിടെയും); Everywhere, Always	Kottayam: Grand Books	Novelette	
2007	Nithyajeevithathile Sasthram (നിത്യജീവിതത്തിലെ ശാസ്ത്രം); Science in Everyday Life	Kottayam: DC Books	Collection of children's questions and answers published in Malayala Manorama "Pathipura" column	
2016	Akalangalile Koottukar (അകലങ്ങളിലെ കൂട്ടുകാർ); Friends From Far Away	Calicut: Poorna Publications		
—	Muthacchan Kathakal (മുത്തച്ഛൻകഥകൾ) (Grandfather Stories)	Balasahithi Prakasan	Stories	
—	Varoo, Nakshatrangalkappuram Pokam (വരൂ, നക്ഷത്രങ്ങൾക്കപ്പുറം പോകാം) (Come, Let Us Go Beyond The Stars)	Kottayam: Grand Books	Novelette	

=== Non-fiction ===
Year	Title	Publisher	Notes	Ref.
1967	Jijnasa (ജിജ്ഞാസ)	Thrissur: Current Books	Collection of 5 essays on science	
1984	Bhadrathayude Samathalangalil (ഭദ്രതയുടെ സമതലങ്ങളിൽ)	Thrissur: Current Books	Travelogue about journeys through the Soviet Union	
1991	Cinemayude Thanima (സിനിമയുടെ തനിമ)	Thrissur: Current Books	About cinema	
1995	Alochana (ആലോചന)	Cochin: Hi Tech Books	Essays on society, literature, science, cinema and philosophy	
2001	Ingane Thudangiyal (ഇങ്ങനെ തുടങ്ങിയാൽ)	Calicut: Islamic Publishing House	Essays	
2003	Prapanchathinte Sathyavum Shailiyum (പ്രപഞ്ചത്തിന്റെ സത്യവും ശൈലിയും)	Kottayam: DC Books		
2007	Ramayanamritham (രാമായണാമൃതം)	Calicut: Poorna Publications	Collection of 31 short essays on Adhyathmaramayanam Kilippattu; initially published as a daily column in Malayala Manorama during Karkkidakam 2007	
2008	C. Radhakrishnante Lekhanangal (സി. രാധാകൃഷ്ണന്റെ ലേഖനങ്ങൾ)	Calicut: Mathrubhumi Books	Collection of 78 essays	
2011	Gitadarsanam (ഗീതാദർശനം)	Cochin: Hi Tech Books	Commentary on the Bhagavad Gita	
2017	Onnilum Tholkkathirikkan (ഒന്നിലും തോൽക്കാതിരിക്കാൻ)	Calicut: Mathrubhumi Books	Essays	
2020	Veenduvicharam (വീണ്ടുവിചാരം)	Kottayam: Don Books	Collection of 36 essays	
2022	Ramayanaprasadam (രാമായണപ്രസാദം)	Calicut: Mathrubhumi Books	Essays on Ramayana and philosophy	
—	Kazhchavattom (കാഴ്ചവട്ടം)	Tiruvalla: CSS Books		

=== Collections ===
Year	Title	Publisher	Notes	Ref.
1976	Asha, Eka, Swapnaparampara (ആശ, ഏക, സ്വപ്‌നപരമ്പര)	Kottayam: DC Books	Collection of three short novels Swapnaparampara individually published by Priyatha, Calicut (2017) and also included in the collection Asatho Maa (1998); Asha and Eka also included in the collection Griharthuram (2005)	
1984	Oodum Paavum (ഊടും പാവും)	Kottayam: Current Books	Collection of three short novels: Oodum Paavum, Randu Divasathe Vicharana, Enpathinalu Amavasikal; Also included in the collection Thamaso Maa (1998); Oodum Paavum individually published by New Books, Kannur (2016)	
1994	Amritham (അമൃതം)	Cochin: Hi Tech Books	Collection of five novelettes: Aazhangalil Amritham, Cassioppiyakkaran Noyel Castelino, Oru Vilippadakale, Control Panel and Driksakshi	
1995	Kannivila (കന്നിവിള) (The First Harvest)	Cochin: Hi Tech Books	Collection of the novels Nizhalppadukal and Mareechika	
1998	Asatho Maa (അസതോ മാ)	Cochin: Hi Tech Books	Collection of seven novels: Athirukal Kadakkunnavar, Swapnaparampara, Ulpirivukal, Kurekkoodi Madangivarathavar, Idukkuthozhuthu, Kaivazhikal and Pin Nilavu	
1998	Thamaso Maa (തമസോ മാ)	Cochin: Hi Tech Books	Collection of three novelettes (Oodum Paavum, Enpathinalu Amavasikal, Randu Divasathe Vicharana) and five novels (Kankalikal, Nilavu, Thevidissi, Ival Avariloruval and Sruthi)	
1998	Mrutyor Maa (മൃത്യോർ മാ)	Cochin: Hi Tech Books	Collection of six novels: Agni, Yudham, Poojyam, Ottayadipathakal, Bruhadaranyakam and Maranasiksha	
1998	Ithihasam (ഇതിഹാസം)	Cochin: Hi Tech Books	Collection of three satirical novels: Kalippattangal, Veshangal, Kalikalavasthakal	
2000	Nadakantham (നാടകാന്തം)	Cochin: Hi Tech Books	Collection of 4 plays (Dweepu, Ithikkannikal, Mathilukal, Nayattu) and two poems (Ottayan Alarunnu and Sudarsanam)	
2003	Mathruparvam (മാതൃപർവം)	Cochin: Hi Tech Books	Collection of 4 novels: Chuzhali, Kanalthullikal, Mrinalam and Verukal Padarunna Vazhikal	
2005	Grihathuram (ഗൃഹാതുരം)	Cochin: Hi Tech Books	Collection of six novelettes: Kannimangakal, Sahadharmini, Thayveru, Tharanisha, Asha and Eka	

=== Works in English ===
Year	Title	Publisher	Notes	Ref.
1974	Zero	New Delhi: Arnold-Heinemann	Translation of Poojyam	
1987	Patches of Shade	Thrissur: Kerala Sahitya Akademi	Translation of Nizhalpadukal	
1993	Maybe Another Day	New Delhi: Sahitya Akademi	Translation of Spandamapinikale Nandi	
2013	Agni	CreateSpace	Translation of the novella Agni	
2015	Birds That Fly Ahead	CreateSpace	Translation of Munpe Parakuna Pakshikal	
2015	Heart-Rending Times	CreateSpace	Translation of Karal Pilarum Kalam	
2015	Now for a Tearful Smile	CreateSpace	Translation of Iniyoru Nirakanchiri	
2016	Bhagavad Gita: Modern Reading	Cochin: Hi Tech Books / CreateSpace	Modern reading and scientific study of the Bhagavad Gita	
2018	Deep Within	Cochin: Hi Tech Books	Translation of Ullil Ullath	
—	Nectar from Sea of Fire	Cochin: Hi Tech Books	Translation of Theekkadal Kadanhu Thirumadhuram	

==== Scientific literature ====
- C. Radhakrishnan (1988). Unity of Space-Matter Manifestations. Cochin: Published by the author.
- C. Radhakrishnan (2002). Stuff and Style of the Universe. Cochin: Hi Tech Books.
- C. Radhakrishnan; K. R. Gopal (2017). "Avyakta: The Fabric of Space". Prespacetime Journal. 7 (16): 2184–2202.
- C. Radhakrishnan; K. R. Gopal (2016). The Secret Behind the Universe. Cochin: Hi Tech Books. ISBN 9781468973280.
- C. Radhakrishnan; K. R. Gopal (2026). The Fabric of Space: Unraveling the Mysteries of Physics. Cochin: Hi Tech Books. ISBN 9789381399545.

== Filmography ==
=== As director ===
Year	Title	Notes
1978	Agni	Based on his 1963 novella; Indian Panorama selection; screened at Mannheim, Istanbul, Moscow and Locarno
1979	Kanalaattam	
1979	Pushyaraagam	
1993	Ottayadipathakal	Based on his 1982 novel; Indian Panorama selection; screened at Mannheim and Tashkent

=== Story / screenplay ===
Year	Title	Role
1975	Priya	Story, screenplay, dialogue (based on Thevidissi)
1983	Pin Nilavu	Story (based on his novel)
1985	Avidathepole Ivideyum	Story
1993	Bhagyavan	Story

== Awards and recognition ==
Year	Award	Notes
1962	Kerala Sahitya Akademi Award	For Nizhalppadukal
1988	Sahitya Akademi Award (Kendra)	For Spandamapinikale Nandi
1990	Vayalar Award	For Munpe Parakkunna Pakshikal
2013	Moortidevi Award	Awarded July 2014; for Theekkadal Kadanhu Thirumadhuram
2015	Mathrubhumi Literary Award	
2016	Ezhuthachan Puraskaram	Highest literary recognition in Kerala
2016	K. P. Kesava Menon Memorial Award	
2022	Sahitya Akademi Eminent Member	Only second Malayalam writer after M. T. Vasudevan Nair to receive this recognition

Other honours include the Odakkuzhal Award, Lalithambika Award, Olappamanna Award, Balamani Amma Award, Achutha Menon Award, Abu Dhabi Sakthi Award, C. P. Menon Award, Muttathu Varkey Award, Devi Prasadam Award, Mahakavi G Award, Pandit Karuppan Award, Mulur Award, Padmaprabha Puraskaram, Sanjayan Puraskaram, O. N. V. Memorial Award, Amritakeerti Puraskaram, Chandu Menon Award, Bahrain Malayali Samajam Award, Oman Prathibha Puraskar, Vallathol Samman, Fellowship of Kerala Sahitya Akademi, Jnanappana Award, Nadabrahma Award, Thakazhi Award, Kaumudi Award, V. T. Award, Madhava Mudra, Nalappadan Award, Mayilppeeli Puraskaram, Thrikkavu Devi Puraskaram, O. V. Vijayan Sahitya Puraskaram, Kaliyachan Award, and Chattambiswami Award.
