= Rajni Kothari =

Indian political scientist and writer(16 August 1928–19 January 2015)

Rajni Kothari (16 August 1928 – 19 January 2015) was an Indian political scientist, political theorist, academic and writer. He was the founder of Centre for the Study of Developing Societies (CSDS) in 1963, a social sciences and humanities research institute, based in Delhi and Lokayan (Dialogue of the People), started in 1980 as a forum for interaction between activists and intellectuals. He was also associated with Indian Council of Social Science Research, International Foundation for Development Alternatives, and People's Union for Civil Liberties.

One of the great political thinkers of the 20th-century, amongst his noted works include Politics in India (1970), Caste in Indian Politics (1973), and Rethinking Democracy (2005). In 1985, Lokayan was awarded the Right Livelihood Award for "linking and strengthening local groups working to protect civil liberties, women's rights and the environment."

== Early life and background ==
Kothari was the only son of his father, a Jain trader. His mother died early in life.

== Career ==
Kothari started his career as a lecturer at Baroda University (now Maharaja Sayajirao University of Baroda). While working here he first received recognition in 1961, when his essays series, "Form and Substance in Indian Politics" were published in the Economic and Political Weekly (then Economic Weekly) over six issues. He had also started writing for Seminar, the journal published by Romesh Thapar. Thereafter he was invited by Professor Shyama Charan Dube to become the Assistant Director of the National Institute of Community Development, Mussoorie.

In 1963, he moved to Delhi, where using a personal grant of Rs. 70,000 given by Professor Richard L. Park, head of the CIA-backed Asia Foundation’s India chapter, he started the Centre for the Study of Developing Societies (CSDS), in the premises of the Indian Adult Education Association at Indraprastha Estate, Delhi, before moving to its present location in Civil Lines, Delhi. Here working along with Ashis Nandy, D.L. Sheth, Ramashray Roy, Bashiruddin Ahmed and others, pioneering works in social sciences were published over next two decades. In 1970 he published Politics in India, which first theorized Indian National Congress as a system rather than a party. Thereafter he published noted works like Caste in Indian Politics (1973) and Footsteps into the Future (1975).

During the early 1970s, he was associated with Congress-leader Indira Gandhi, and negotiated with the Congress-led central government for Navnirman movement, a socio-political movement of 1974 against corruption in Gujarat, which ultimately led to the dissolution of the state government. However, with the entry of Sanjay Gandhi, he distanced himself from Congress, and came close to Jaya Prakash Narayan and the Janata Party instead. After the Emergency of 1975, he moved away from political parties, and started his career as an activist. This phase culminated with the foundation of Lokayan - Dialogue of the People in 1980, a forum for interaction between activists, thinkers and intellectuals to talked about positive changes in the fields of religion, agriculture, health, politics, and education.

He soon became associated with Citizens for Democracy, and People's Union for Civil Liberties, a human rights body established in 1976, where he remained General Secretary from 1982 to 1984, and subsequently its President. He served as the chairman of Indian Council of Social Science Research and remained a member of the Planning Commission.

Besides scholarly articles he also wrote newspaper columns, and in 2002 published his memoirs titled, Memoirs: Uneasy is the Life of the Mind. In his final book, Rethinking Democracy (2005), Kothari explored the possible meanings of democracy. An excerpt from the book was later included in the first volume of India Since the 90s series, The Hunger of the Republic: Our Present in Retrospect, edited by Ashish Rajadhyaksha.

CSDS where he was an honorary fellow, in 2004 established The Rajni Kothari Chair in Democracy in his honour, funded by Ford Foundation and the Sir Ratan Tata Trust. On 27 November 2012, CSDS celebrated its 50th anniversary, presided over by Kothari.

== Personal life ==
He married in 1947, and his wife Hansa died in 1999. In his final years, his eldest son Smitu died in 2009. Smitu, trained in physics, communications and sociology, was involved in ecological, cultural and human rights issues. He had been a visiting professor at Cornell and Princeton Universities. Rajni Kothari had two other sons, Miloon and Ashish, and two grandchildren, Emma and Gyan.

== Death ==
He died on 19 January 2015 at his residence at Patparganj in East Delhi following urinary tract infection and other age related ailments.

== Works ==
- Rajni Kothari; Centre for the Study of Developing Societies (1969). Context of electoral change in India: general elections, 1967. Academic Books.
- Rajni Kothari (1970). Politics in India. Orient Blackswan. ISBN 978-81-250-0072-3.
- Rajni Kothari (1971). Political economy of development. Gokhale Institute of Politics and Economics.
- Rajni Kothari (1975). Footsteps Into the Future: Diagnosis of the Present World and a Design for an Alternative. Free Press. ISBN 978-0-02-917580-4.
- Rajni Kothari; Centre for the Study of Developing Societies (1976). State and nation building. Allied Publishers.
- Rajni Kothari (1976). Democracy and the Representative System in India. Citizens for Democracy.
- Rajni Kothari (1976). Democratic Polity and Social Change in India: Crisis and Opportunities. Allied Pub.
- Rajni Kothari (1980). Towards a Just World. Institute for World Order.
- Rajni Kothari; Gobinda Mukhoty (1984). Who are the guilty? (PDF). People's Union for Democratic Rights;People's Union for Civil Liberties.
- Rajni Kothari (1989). State against democracy: in search of humane governance. New Horizons Press. ISBN 978-0-945257-16-5.
- Rajni Kothari (1989). Towards a liberating peace. United Nations University. ISBN 978-81-85296-00-5.
- Rajni Kothari (1989). Rethinking development: in search of humane alternatives. New Horizons Press. ISBN 978-0-945257-18-9.
- Rajni Kothari (1989). Transformation & Survival: In Search of Humane World Order. New Horizon Press. ISBN 978-0-945257-17-2.
- Rajni Kothari (1989). Politics and the people: in search of a humane India. New Horizons Press. ISBN 978-0-945257-20-2.
- Rajni Kothari (1995). Poverty: Human Consciousness and the Amnesia of Development. Zed Books. ISBN 978-1-85649-361-1.
- Rajni Kothari; D. L. Sheth; Ashis Nandy (1996). The Multiverse of Democracy: Essays in Honour of Rajni Kothari. SAGE Publications. ISBN 978-81-7036-523-5.
- Deepak Nayyar; Rajni Kothari; Arjun Sengupta (1998). Economic development and political democracy: the interaction of economics and politics in independent India. National Council of Applied Economic Research. ISBN 978-81-85877-53-2.
- Rajni Kothari (1998). Communalism in Indian Politics. Rainbow Publishers. ISBN 978-81-86962-00-8.
- Rajni Kothari (2005). Rethinking Democracy. Orient Blackswan. ISBN 978-81-250-2894-9.
- Rajni Kothari (2002). Memoirs: Uneasy is the Life of the Mind. Rupa & Company. ISBN 978-81-7167-813-6.
- Rajni Kothari (2009). The Writings Of Rajni Kothari. Orient BlackSwan. ISBN 978-81-250-3755-2.
