= Vishwanath Prasad Tiwari =

Indian poet and critic (born 1940)

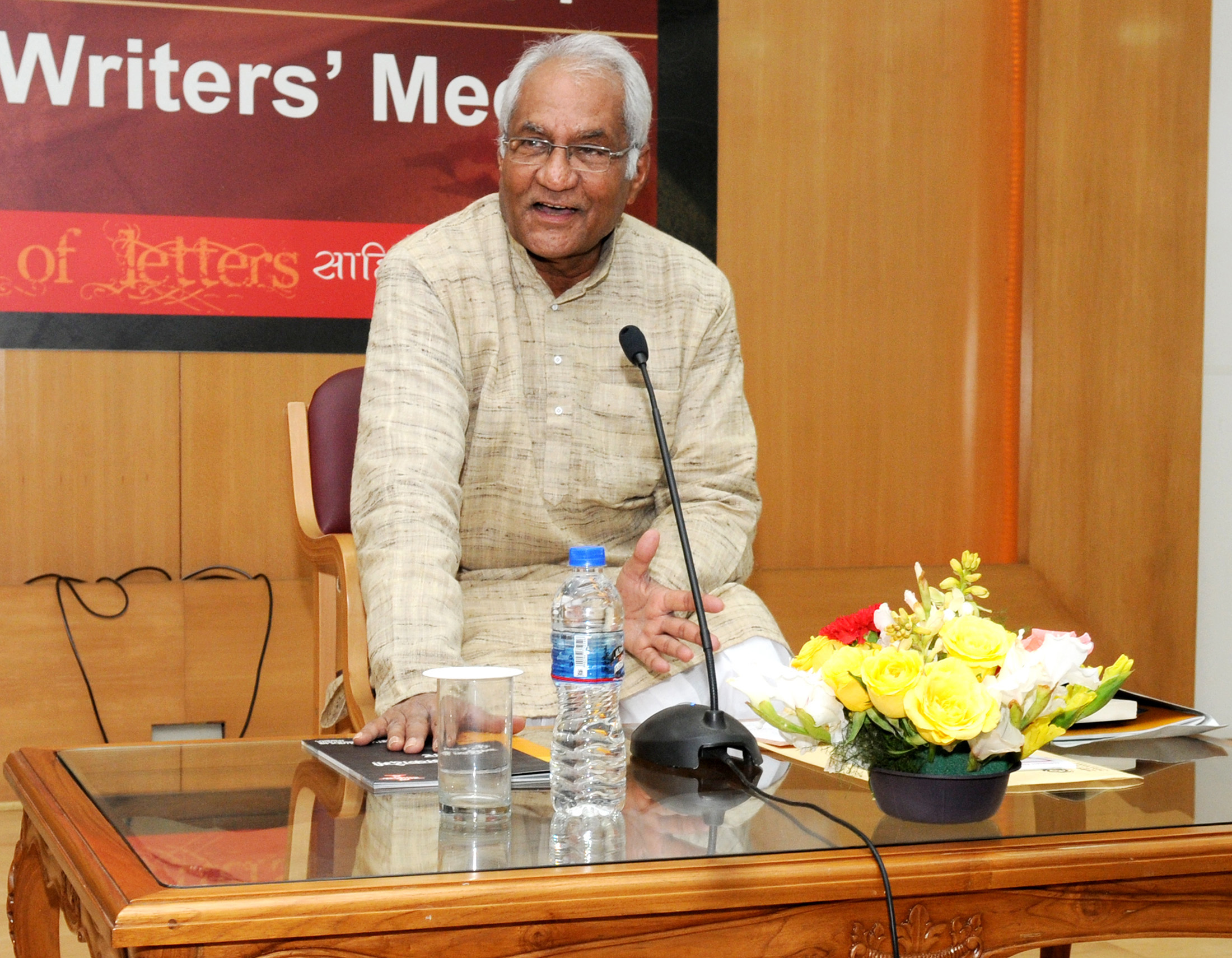
- Vishwanath Prasad Tiwari in 2012, New Delhi
- Born: 1940 (age 85–86); Gorakhpur, Uttar Pradesh, India
- Education: PhD
- Alma mater: Deen Dayal Upadhyay Gorakhpur University
- Occupations: Poet, Editor, Critic
- Writing career
- Language: Hindi
- Years active: 1970–present
- Genres: Poetry; Criticism; Travelogue; Biography
- Notable awards: Padma Shri (2023); Vyas Samman (2011)

Vishwanath Prasad Tiwari (born 1940) is an Indian poet, editor, critic and a former president of the Sahitya Akademi who served to the post from 2013 to 2018. He has published around 50 books in Hindi on various genres such as criticism, poetry, travelogues, biographies, interviews besides editing books.

== Biography ==
He was born in 1940 in Gorakhpur, Uttar Pradesh. He obtained BA with Hindi from Gorkhapur University and MA and PhD in Hindi literature. He served as the head of the department and acharya for Hindi at Deen Dayal Upadhyay Gorakhpur University until he retired in 2001. After starting his writing career he published his first uncertain book in 1970.

His prominent work includes Saath Chalte Hue, Kavita Kya Hai (What is kavita), and Bistar Duniya Le Liye.

== Awards ==
| Year | Award | Nominated work | Result | Ref. |
|---|---|---|---|---|
| 2023 | Padma Shri | Contribution to Literature and Education | Won | |
| 2019 | Moortidevi Award | Asti Aur Bhavti | Won | |
| 2019 | Sahitya Akademi Fellowship | Contribution to Hindi literature | Won | |
| 2019 | Gangadhar National Award | —N/a | Nominated | |
| 2011 | Vyas Samman | Phir Bhi Kuch Rah Jayega | Won | |
