= Sarthak Bhambri =

Indian Olympic competitor

Sarthak Bhambri (born 14 August 1998) is an Indian athlete from Delhi. He competed in the mixed 4 × 400m relay event at the 2020 Summer Olympics.
