= South Asia Institute, University of Texas at Austin =

The South Asia Institute was established as part of a University of Texas at Austin initiative to promote South Asian programs, especially those pertaining to contemporary issues, across the entire university and in the larger community. As a National Resource Center for South Asia funded by a Title VI grant from the U.S. Department of Education, the institute sponsors major conferences, scholarly symposia and a weekly South Asia Seminar. The institute also provides Foreign Language and Area Studies (FLAS) fellowships to students pursuing graduate degrees relating to South Asia in any department or school of the University.

Additionally, the Title VI grant also provides resources for outreach programs to K-12 schools, post-secondary institutions, business and civic organizations, and the Texas community at large. Another central mission of the Institute is to promote the study of contemporary South Asian languages in cooperation with the Department of Asian Studies and the Hindi-Urdu Flagship Program. This often takes the form of Foreign Language and Area Studies (FLAS) grants, which are offered for study during both the academic year and the summer. These include Bengali, Hindi, Kannada, Malayalam, Sanskrit, Tamil, Telugu and Urdu, while funding is also available for study of Pashto and Persian (taught in the Department of Middle Eastern Studies) if their work relates to South Asia.

The College of Liberal Arts currently awards seven degrees in South Asian studies: B.A. and M.A. in Asian Studies; B.A., M.A. and Ph.D. in Asian Cultures and Languages; and two dual M.A. degrees with the McCombs School of Business and the LBJ School of Public Affairs.
