= Mysore State =

Indian state from 1950 to 1956; predecessor of Karnataka

Coordinates: 12.30°N 76.65°E

- State of India
- 1950–1956
- Coat of arms

- Mysore State, 1956
- Capital: Mysore
- Government
- Rajpramukh
  - 1950–1956: Jayachamarajendra Wadiyar
- History
  - Integration of Kingdom of Mysore into the Indian Union: 26 January 1950
  - Renamed Mysore State: 1 November 1956
Preceded by	Succeeded by
Kingdom of Mysore	Karnataka
- Today part of: India

Mysore State, colloquially Old Mysore, was a political territory within the Dominion of India and the subsequent Republic of India from 1950 until 1956. The state was formed by renaming the Kingdom of Mysore, with Bangalore replacing Mysore as the state's capital when Parliament passed the States Reorganisation Act in 1956. Mysore State was considerably enlarged when it became a linguistically homogeneous Kannada-speaking state within the Republic of India by incorporating territories from Andhra, Bombay, Coorg, Hyderabad, and Madras States, as well as other petty fiefdoms. It was subsequently renamed Karnataka in 1973.

== History ==
The Kingdom of Mysore was one of the three largest princely states in British India. Upon India's independence from Britain in 1947, Maharaja Jayachamarajendra Wadiyar signed the instrument of accession, with the Union of India on 9 August 1947. The territories of the erstwhile princely state of Mysore were then reconstituted into a state within the Union, on 26 January 1950, with its administrative integration into the Indian Union.

In 1953 during the formation of Andhra, the Bellary district was transferred from Madras to Mysore.

=== Reorganisation ===
In 1956, the Government of India effected a comprehensive re-organisation of provincial boundaries, based upon the principle of shared language. As a result of the States Reorganisation Act on 1 November 1956, the Kannada-speaking districts of Belgaum (exclusing Chandgad), Bijapur, Dharwad, and North Canara were transferred from Bombay to Mysore. South Canara was transferred from Madras; and Koppal, Raichur, Kalaburagi and Bidar districts from Hyderabad. Also, the small Coorg State was merged, becoming a district in Mysore. The state was renamed Karnataka on 1 November 1973.

Map of southern India before the reorganisation of 1956 with the blue outline of the expanded Mysore State (after 1956)

== Maharaja of Mysore ==
No	Portrait	Name	Term of office		Duration	Selected former office(s)
1		Jayachamarajendra Wadiyar	15 August 1947	25 January 1950	2 years, 163 days	Yuvaraja of Mysore

== Rajpramukh of Mysore ==
No	Portrait	Name	Term of office		Duration	Selected former office(s)
1		Jayachamarajendra Wadiyar	26 January 1950	31 October 1956	6 years, 279 days	Maharaja of Mysore

== Governors of Mysore ==
No	Portrait	Name	Term of office		Duration	Selected former/latter office(s)
1		Jayachamarajendra Wadiyar	1 November 1956	4 May 1964	7 years, 185 days	Maharaja of Mysore, Rajpramukh of Mysore
2		S. M. Shrinagesh	4 May 1964	2 April 1965	333 days	Chief of the Army Staff
3		V. V. Giri	2 April 1965	13 May 1967	2 years, 41 days	Fourth President of India, Third Vice-President of India
4		Gopal Swarup Pathak	13 May 1967	30 August 1969	2 years, 109 days	Fourth Vice-president of India
-	–	Justice A. R. Somanath Iyer (Acting)	30 August 1969	23 October 1969	54 days	Chief Justice of Karnataka High Court
5		Dharma Vira	23 October 1970	1 February 1972	1 year, 101 days	Governor of Punjab, Haryana, and West Bengal
6		Mohanlal Sukhadia	1 February 1972	31 October 1976	4 years, 273 days	Chief Minister of Rajasthan, Governor of United Andhra Pradesh and Tamil Nadu

== Prime ministers of Mysore ==
# (Note: A parenthetical number indicates that the incumbent has previously held office.)	Portrait	Name	Constituency	Term (tenure length)			Assembly (election)	Party (Note: This column only names the chief minister's party. The state government he headed may have been a complex coalition of several parties and independents; these are not listed here.)
1		K. Chengalaraya Reddy	Kolar	25 October 1947	26 January 1950	2 years, 93 days	Not established yet	Indian National Congress

== Chief ministers of Mysore ==
# (Note: A parenthetical number indicates that the incumbent has previously held office.)	Portrait	Name	Constituency	Term (tenure length)			Assembly (election)	Party (Note: This column only names the chief minister's party. The state government he headed may have been a complex coalition of several parties and independents; these are not listed here.)
1		K. Chengalaraya Reddy	N/A	26 January 1950	30 March 1952	2 years, 64 days	Not established yet	Indian National Congress
2		Kengal Hanumanthaiah	Ramanagara	30 March 1952	19 August 1956	4 years, 142 days	1st (1952 election) continued...	Indian National Congress
3		Kadidal Manjappa	Tirthahalli	19 August 1956	31 October 1956	73 days	1st (1952 election) continued...	Indian National Congress
Chief Minister of Mysore (following the state's reorganisation) (Note: On 1 November 1956, via the States Reorganisation Act, Mysore State was significantly expanded along linguistic lines. The Kannada-speaking districts of Bombay, Hyderabad and Madras states, as well as the entirety of Coorg, were added to it.)
4		S. Nijalingappa	Molakalmuru	1 November 1956	16 May 1958	1 year, 197 days	...continued 1st (1952)	Indian National Congress
4		S. Nijalingappa	Molakalmuru	1 November 1956	16 May 1958	1 year, 197 days	2nd (1957)	Indian National Congress
5		B. D. Jatti	Jamkhandi	16 May 1958	14 March 1962	3 years, 302 days	2nd (1957)	Indian National Congress
6		S. R. Kanthi	Hungud	14 March 1962	21 June 1962	99 days	3rd (1962)	Indian National Congress
(4)		S. Nijalingappa	Bagalkot	21 June 1962	29 May 1968	5 years, 343 days	3rd (1962)	Indian National Congress
(4)		S. Nijalingappa	Shiggaon	21 June 1962	29 May 1968	5 years, 343 days	4th (1967)	Indian National Congress
7		Veerendra Patil	Chincholi	29 May 1968	18 March 1971	2 years, 293 days	4th (1967)	Indian National Congress (O)
–		Vacant (Note: President's rule may be imposed when the "government in a state is not able to function as per the Constitution", which often happens because no party or coalition has a majority in the assembly. When President's_rule#Karnataka) (President's rule)	N/A	19 March 1971	20 March 1972	1 year, 1 day	Dissolved	N/A
8		D. Devaraj Urs (Note: On 1 November 1973, via the Mysore State (Alteration of Name) Act, Mysore State was renamed as Karnataka. Thus, Devaraj Urs was Chief Minister of Mysore between 20 March 1972 and 31 October 1973, and Chief Minister of Karnataka after that.)	Hunsur	20 March 1972	31 December 1977	5 years, 286 days	5th (1972)	Indian National Congress (R)

== See also ==
- Bombay State
- Political integration of India
