= Moturi Satyanarayana =

Indian independence activist (1902–1995)

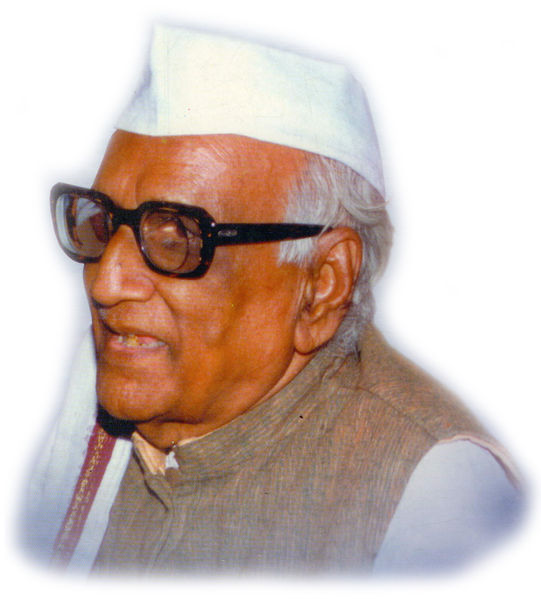

Member of Parliament, Rajya Sabha (Nominated)
- In office 3 April 1952 – 2 April 1966

Personal details
- Born: 2 February 1902 Dondapadu, Krishna district, Andhra Pradesh
- Died: March 6, 1995 (aged 93)
- Spouse: Suryakanta Devi
- Occupation: Activist, politician

Moturi Satyanarayana (2 February 1902 – 6 March 1995) was an Indian independence activist alongside Mohandas Gandhi until 1947 and then a member of the Constituent Assembly of India which drafted the Indian Constitution. He was a nominated member of the Rajya Sabha till 1966. He was instrumental in making Hindi an official language in the Indian Constitution, while tolerating the other major Indian languages. He devoted his later life to helping spread Hindi in South India.

== Early life, family, and education ==
Moturi Satyanarayana was born in a Kamma family in Dondapadu village near Gudivada in Krishna district of Andhra Pradesh. After his primary education, he studied English, Telugu, and Hindi at the National College in Machilipatnam, achieving a high proficiency in them. He joined the Dakshin Bharat Hindi Prachar Sabha as a volunteer and gradually became the Secretary and Principal Secretary of that organisation. A major mission in his life would be to efficiently promote the growth of Hindi in South India between 1936 and 1961. He married Suryakanta Devi and had three sons and four daughters with her.

== Activism in the Indian independence movement (1925–1947) ==
Moturi Satyanarayana participated in Quit India Movement in 1942 and was jailed.

During this time, he was an active promoter of the Hindi language. He was the Editor of "Hindi Pracharak" (1926–36), "Hindi Prachar Samachar" (1938–61) and Dakshina Bharat (1947–61). He organised many Institutions all over India such as "Dakshina Bharata Hindi Prachara Sabha" of Madras (1926–61). He was the founding secretary of "Telugu Basha Samithi" of Madras and Hyderabad.

== Framer of the Indian Constitution (1948–1950) ==
After India became independent from Britain, Moturi was a member of the Constituent Assembly of India from 1948 to 1950. He served as a Member of the Drafting Committee of the Indian Constitution for its Language Section. He was a key figure in the divisive debates on: what to make the official language of India (Hindi, English, or a number of local languages such as Bengali, Telugu, Tamil, etc.) how to set up a pluralistic civil service examination system; and how to balance local languages with national languages at different levels of government. He advocated for drafting of the Constitution in Indian languages first.

== Member of India's Parliament (1950–1966) ==
After Indian Independence, from 1950 to 1952, Moturi was a member of the Provisional Parliament of India as an MP. After the Indian Constitution was drafted, Moturi was nominated by the President of India as a Rajya Sabha (Upper House) member. He served twice between 1954 and 1966 (3 April 1954 to 2 April 1960 and 3 April 1960 to 2 April 1966). He was also a member of: the Madras Legislative Council (1952–54); the Central Advisory Board of Education of the Govt. of India; the Madras University Senate (1952–53); the Central Official Languages Commission (1954–56).

== Scholarly interests and propagation of Hindi through India ==
Moturi had many scholarly interests. He was the chief editor of Encyclopedia on Social Sciences in Hindi published by the Hindi Vikas Samithi, Madras. He was the founding secretary of the Telugu Bhasha Samiti. He also founded the Hindi Vikas Samiti and published 'Vishwa Vignana Samhita.' Finally, Moturi was an editor for a comprehensive encyclopaedia published in his native language of Telugu called Telugu Vignana Sarvasvamu.

== Awards ==
Later in his life, Moturi won many awards. He was a recipient of the Padma Shri award in 1954 and the Padma Bhushan award in 1962, both from the Government of India. Andhra University honoured him with its Kala Prapoorna award in 1977.

== Death ==
Moturi lived to the age of 93. When a family member asked the nonagenarian Moturi about the secret of his longevity, his brief response was: "Listen more, eat less."

== Legacy ==
As an activist for Indian Independence, a framer of the Indian Constitution, and a Parliamentarian, Moturi was a key figure in India's political history. However, some people criticise his decision to support Hindi, and not English, as the official language of India. The awkward provisions in the Indian Constitution and a later push by pro-Hindi hardliners led to "language riots" in the 1960s in southern states such as Tamil Nadu, where more than 60 people died. Several students immolated themselves protesting the forced use of Hindi as the national language. While English has become the de facto national language of India by 2010, the Indian Constitution has continued to serve as the fundamental basis of the India's polity and society and its drafting was a major accomplishment.
