= Shyama Charan Dube =

Indian anthropologist and sociologist

- Born: 25 July 1922; Narsinghpur, Madhya Pradesh, India
- Died: 4 February 1996 (aged 73)
- Education: Nagpur University
- Scientific career
- Fields: Anthropology, Sociology
- Institutions: Hislop College, University of Lucknow

Shyama Charan Dube (S.C.Dube) (25 July 1922 – 4 February 1996) was an Indian anthropologist, sociologist, and former president of the Indian Sociological Society from 1975 to 1976.

== Education and career ==
Born in Narsinghpur that is now in Madhya Pradesh, India, Dube earned his Master's Degree in Political Science from Nagpur University and started his professional career as a lecturer in Hislop College in Nagpur, Maharashtra. He later joined the Department of Political Science at the University of Lucknow.

From 1972-1977, Dube served as Director of the Indian Institute of Advanced Study in Shimla. During this time, he was also the President of the Indian Sociological Society from 1975-1976. He later became. the Vice Chancellor at Jammu University from 1978-1980. From 1980-1983, he was a National Fellow at the Indian Council of Social Sciences Research.

== Contribution ==
Dube was known for his research of Indian villages and tribal societies. Specifically, he made use of the structural functionalist approach to study these villages. He studied the Kamar tribe, an aboriginal group in Madhya Pradesh.

He was a firm believer in understanding and focusing on the larger ideas in anthropology rather than the menial words or concepts that make up those ideas. He also emphasized the malleability of anthropological concepts and their ability to change over time.

== Books ==
- 1955 Indian Village
- 1958 India's Changing Villages
- 1974 Contemporary India and its Modernization
- 1988 Modernization and Development: The Search for Alternative Paradigms
- 1998 Antiquity to Modernity in Tribal India
- 1992 Understanding Change: Anthropological and Sociological Perspectives
- 1979 Public Services and Social Responsibility
- 1947 Field Songs of Chhattisgarh
- 1990 Tradition and Development
- 1983 On Crisis and Commitment in Social Sciences
- 1951 The Kamar
- 1983 Secularization in Multi-Religious Societies
- 1983 Development Perspective for the 1980s
