= Kalyan Mal Lodha =

Indian educator and writer

- Born: 28 September 1921; Jodhpur, Rajasthan, India
- Died: 21 November 2009 (aged 88)
- Occupation(s): Educator, Hindi writer and critic, social reformer
- Notable work: Vagdwar (Vāgdvāra)
- Parents: Chandmalji Lodha (father); Suraj Kanwar (mother)
- Relatives: Chandmal Lodha (brother) Shrikishanmal Lodha (brother)
- Awards: Murti Devi Award (2003)

Kalyan Mal Lodha was an Indian educator, Hindi writer, literary critic, and social reformer. He served as the Vice-Chancellor of Jodhpur University.

== Biography ==
Lodha was born in Jodhpur, Rajasthan, and lived in Kolkata. He was actively involved in promoting the Jain religion and community. He was the professor and head of the Hindi department at Calcutta University, but has since retired.

In 2002, Lodha received the Bihari Award from the K. K. Birla Foundation in Kolkata for his book, Vagdwar. The book is sometimes transliterated as Vāgdvāra. The book examines eight Hindi poets: Tulsidas, Soordas, Kabirdas, Nirala, Maithili Sharan Gupta, Jai Shankar Prasad, Mahadevi Verma, and Makhanlal Chaturvedi. His other books include Some Characters of Hindi Modern Poetry, Radha in Indian Literature-Criticism and Philosophy of Speech.

Lodha's name is transliterated as Kalyāṇamala Loṛhā on WorldCat.

== Bibliography ==
- Vāgdvāra: sāta Hindī kaviyoṃ kā maulika adhyayana. Varanasi: Viśvavidyālaya Prakāśana, 2000. ISBN 978-81-7124-251-1
