= Solvathellam Unmai (TV series) =

Indian Tamil social drama series

- Solvathellam Unmai by Lakshmy Ramakrishnan
- Also known as: Solla Thudikkuthu Manasu (சொல்லத் துடிக்குது மனசு) - Zee Tamil; Nerkonda Paarvai (நேர்கொண்ட பார்வை) - Kalaignar TV; Unmai Vellum (உண்மை வெல்லும்) - Kalaignar TV
- Genre: Social Drama
- Created by: Ramya Ramakrishnan; Parthiban
- Based on: All that is said is the truth
- Directed by: Parthiban
- Presented by: Ramya Ramakrishnan
- Theme music composer: Vishal Chandrashekhar
- Opening theme: Solvathellam Unmai by Swetha Mohan
- Country of origin: India
- Original language: Tamil
- No. of seasons: 7
- No. of episodes: 3500

Production
- Cinematography: Saravanan; Venkatesh
- Editors: David; G. Madhan
- Camera setup: Multi-camera
- Running time: 60 minutes
- Production company: Media Masons private Ltd

Original release
- Network: Zee Tamil; Kalaignar TV
- Release: 2 October 2009 – present

Related
- Nijangal; Vaazhthu Kaatuvom; Bathuku Jataka Bandi; Kadhayallithu Jeevitham; Baduku Jataka Bandi

Solvathellam Unmai (Tamil: சொல்வதெல்லாம் உண்மை) (transl. All that is said is the truth) previously known as Solla Thudikkuthu Manasu (Tamil: சொல்லத் துடிக்குது மனசு) (transl. The heart longs to speak) and also known as Nerkonda Paarvai (Tamil: நேர்கொண்ட பார்வை) (transl. The Direct Gaze) and also known as Unmai Vellum (Tamil: உண்மை வெல்லும்) (transl. Truth will triumph) is a 2009 Indian Tamil language reality-justice show about real-life situations. It aired on Zee Tamil from 2 October 2009 — 31 July 2011 and from 1 August 2011 to 31 December 2019 and from 2 January 2020 it is aired on Kalaignar TV from Monday to Friday at 08:00PM (IST). and later available on Behindwoods YouTube channel. The Show previously hosted by Vinodhini and from season 2 to till date it was hosted by Ramya Ramakrishnan. Whilst, Nirmala Periyasamy, Sudha Chandran and Shakeela hosted few episodes in season 2, 3 & 7. The show deals with genuine real life stories of people and portrays positive societal values for building a tolerant and harmonious Tamil Nadu and they try to come up with a solution for the same on the channel.

It is a socially responsive talk show aired on Zee Tamil from 2009 - 2019. From the year 2020, it is aired on Kalaignar TV and available on Behindwoods - YouTube channel. The show focuses on providing psychological and legal counseling, aid, and guidance to disputing families and individuals. It was instrumental in reuniting more than 2000 families. It received critical acclaim. It gained more popularity from the audience since its beginning and reached all over India. It is the longest running Tamil television talk show crossing 3500+ episodes. The show completes its 15 years and steps into the 16th year on 2 October 2024.

== Format ==
The show features common people seeking justice. It opens with the anchor saying a few words about the importance of expressing one’s needs and concerns to find what they need. She then invites people onto the set to share their life experiences. They talk about unfortunate incidents that have occurred in their life, something that led them to the point where they had to come in front of the camera to find solutions to their problems. After they share their story, people concerned with the said problem are invited onto the set. They may be friends or family. They are given a chance to say their side of the story.

Once the anchor listens to both sides, she expresses her views on the topic and reprimands those who she thinks is guilty. She allows them to let out their feelings so that they can come to a conclusion. The panel leaves the set only after finding a solution. In some episodes, celebrities are invited where they are given a platform to talk about the struggles they have faced in life.

== Seasons overview ==
Season	Title	Main Host	Guest Host	Episodes	Originally aired		Channel	Time
1	Solla Thudikkuthu Manasu (சொல்லத் துடிக்குது மனசு)	Vinodhini Vaidyanathan	Lakshmy Ramakrishnan	375	2 October 2009	31 July 2011	Zee Tamil	Monday - Friday; 8:00PM (IST)
2	Solvathellam Unmai (சொல்வதெல்லாம் உண்மை)	Lakshmy Ramakrishnan	Nirmala Periyasamy	940	1 August 2011	29 May 2015	Zee Tamil	Monday - Friday; 8:00PM (IST)
3	Solvathellam Unmai (சொல்வதெல்லாம் உண்மை)	Lakshmy Ramakrishnan	Sudha Chandran	175	1 June 2015	29 March 2016	Zee Tamil	Monday - Friday; 8:00PM (IST)
4	Solvathellam Unmai (சொல்வதெல்லாம் உண்மை)	Lakshmy Ramakrishnan		275	4 April 2016	21 April 2017	Zee Tamil	Monday - Friday; 8:00PM (IST)
5	Solvathellam Unmai (சொல்வதெல்லாம் உண்மை)	Lakshmy Ramakrishnan		575	24 April 2017	31 December 2019	Zee Tamil	Monday - Friday; 8:00PM (IST)
6	Naan Veezhven Endru Ninaithayo (நான் வீழ்வெண் எந்து நினைதயோ)	Lakshmy Ramakrishnan		50	2 January 2020	15 March 2020	Behindwoods (YouTube)	Monday - Friday; 8:00PM (IST)
7	Nerkonda Paarvai (நேர்கொண்ட பார்வை)	Lakshmy Ramakrishnan	Shakeela	500+	1 September 2020		Kalaignar TV	Monday - Friday; 8:00PM (IST)
8	Unmai Vellum (உண்மை வெல்லும்)	Lakshmy Ramakrishnan		(Ongoing)	2 June 2025	Present	Kalaignar TV	

== Spin-off ==
Nijangal (transl. Realities) is a 2016-2017 Tamil-language reality-justice show about real-life situations. It aired every Monday to Saturday at 12:30PM (IST) on Sun TV from 24 October 2016 to 4 March 2017 for 218 episodes. The show host by Khushboo Sundar. The show revolves around real life situations and they try to come up with a solution for the same on the channel. It was Produced by Vaidehi Ramamurthy and director by Mani Sridhar.

Vaazhthu Kaatuvom (transl. Let's live and show) is a 2024 Indian Tamil-language reality arbitration-based reality court show adjudicating real-life family disputes. It is adapted from the Zee Tamil's show Solvathellam Unmai. This program has been developed in a brand new format with the advice of experts and specialists in a new arena where people's grievances and problems are spoken boldly.

Actress Kuyili hosts the show. It aired on Kalaignar TV from 26 February 2024 to 21 June 2024 on Monday to Friday from 21:00 and is also presented on Kalaignar TV's YouTube channel.

== Adaptations ==
Language	Title	Original release	Network(s)
Malayalam	Kadhayallithu Jeevitham	2 October 2010-14 April 2020	Amrita TV
Malayalam	Jeevitham Sakshi	22 August 2014- 2 February 2017	Kairali TV
Kannada	Baduku Jataka Bandi	3 January 2011	Zee Kannada
Telugu	Bathuku Jataka Bandi	15 August 2013-24 July 2021	Zee Telugu

== In popular culture ==
The phrase Ennamma Ippadi Panreengalemaa spoken by Lakshmy Ramakrishnan in the show Solvathellam Unmai became popular. The dialogue was parodied in the TV show Adhu Idhu Edhu which became famous. Lakshmi threatened legal action against the makers of that show for demeaning her show. The dialogue was also parodied in films like Darling (2015), Massu Engira Masilamani (2015), Naanum Rowdy Dhaan (2015), Miruthan (2016) and Theri (2016). The dialogue also inspired a song of the same name composed by D. Imman for Rajini Murugan (2016). The show was parodied in films like Kadavul Irukaan Kumaru (2016) and Aruvi (2017).
