= Pushpa Bharati =

Indian writer and author (born 1935)

- Born: 1935 (age 90–91); Moradabad, United Provinces, British India
- Occupations: Writer, author
- Spouse: Dharamvir Bharati
- Writing career
- Language: Hindi
- Genres: Stories, Biographies, Travelogue
- Notable works: Shubhagata, Dhai Aakhar Prem Ke, Saras Samvad, Safar Suhane, Yaadein, Yaadein aur Yaadein
- Notable awards: Maharashtra State Hindi Sahitya Academy Award (2008); Vyas Samman (2023); Hindi Seva Samman by Kalidasa Akademi; Sahitya Bhushan by Uttar Pradesh Hindi Sansthan

Pushpa Bharati (born 1935) is an Indian writer and author known for her contributions to Hindi literature. She has authored 17 books in Hindi Language.

== Biography ==
Pushpa was born in Moradabad, Uttar Pradesh, in 1935. She pursued her Master of Arts in Hindi literature from the University of Allahabad in 1955. She was married to Dharamvir Bharati, a renowned Hindi writer. The Quit India Movement of 1942 inspired Bharati to write stories.

As a professor, she taught in the degree colleges of Calcutta from 1957 to 1960 and in Bombay in 1975.

Her literary career spans several decades. She has authored and edited books across genres earning her widespread critical acclaim. Her notable works, including Shubhagata, Dhai Aakhar Prem Ke, Saras Samvad, Safar Suhane and many others, have gained popularity among readers.

Throughout her career, Pushpa Bharati authored several books which includes Romanchak Satya Kathaayein, Prem Piyaala Jin Piya, Dhaai Akshar Prem Ke, Saras Samvaad, Safar Suhaane, Adhunik Sahitya Bo, Ek Duniya Bachchon Ki, Vaadein, and Yaadein, Yaadein aur Yaadein.

She joined the Children's Film Production Organization of the Government of India. She also served as a jury member for the Film Censor Board in 1988.

She has also authored a biography on Amitabh Bachchan titled Amitabh Bachchan Jeevan Gaatha, published by Vani Prakashan in 2021.

== Bibliography ==
- Romanchak Satya Kathaayein (In two parts)
- Prem Piyaala Jin Piya
- Dhaai Akshar Prem Ke
- Saras Samvaad
- Safar Suhaane
- Adhunik Sahitya Bodh
- Ek Duniya Bachchon Ki
- Vaadein
- Yaadein, Yaadein aur Yaadein
- Akshar Akshar Yagya
- Dharamveer Bharti Se Sakshatkaar
- Meri Vani Garik-Vasna
- Saans Ki Kalam Se
- Dharamveer Bharti Ki Sahitya-Sadhana
- Harivansh Rai Bachchan Ki Sahitya-Sadhana
- Pushpanjali

== Personal life ==
She was married to Dharamvir Bharati and lives in Sahitya Sahwas, an apartment building in Bandra, Mumbai.

== Awards and recognition ==
In recognition of her literary contributions, Pushpa Bharati received various honors, including the Maharashtra State Hindi Sahitya Academy Award in 2008, Hindi Seva Samman from Kalidasa Akademi, Government of Madhya Pradesh, and Sahitya Bhushan from Uttar Pradesh Hindi Sansthan, Government of Uttar Pradesh.

Notably, her memoir, Yaadein, Yaadein aur Yaadein (2016), was honored with the 33rd Vyas Samman in 2023 by the K. K. Birla Foundation. This award includes a cash prize of ₹4 lakh, a citation, and a plaque.

She has also been the recipient of other distinguished awards, such as the Rama Award, Swajan Award, Bharti Gaurav Award, Ashirwad Saraswat Award, and Uttar Hindi Shiromani Award.
