= Chandrakanta (author) =

Indian writer (born 1938)

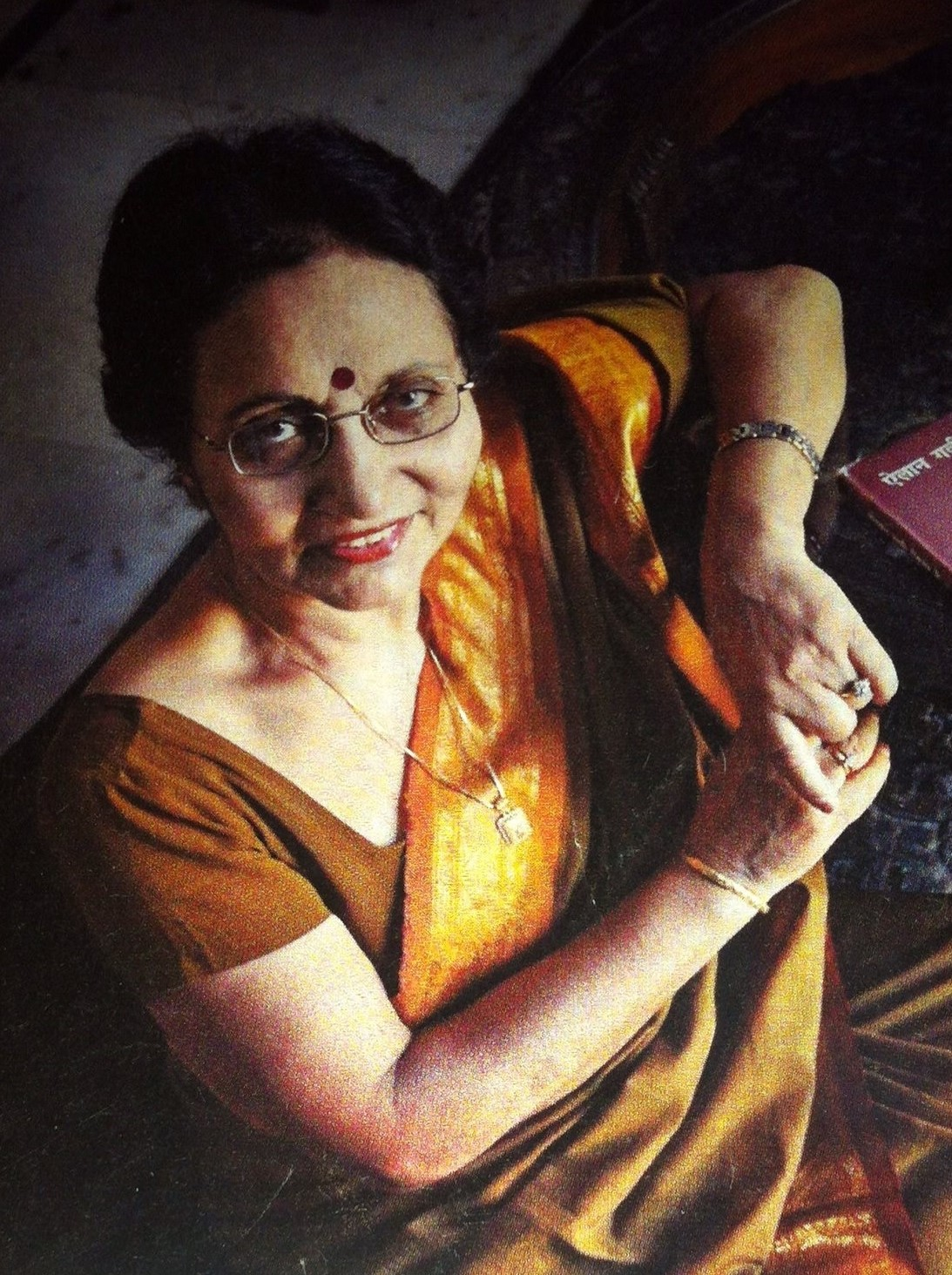
Hindi author Chandrakanta

Chandrakanta (born 1938) is a writer, born in Srinagar, India. She has written many novels and stories in the Hindi language including the epic Katha Satisar, which was awarded the Vyas Samman prize in 2005.

To date, her published short stories number about 200. She has also published seven novels as well as poetical works. Her writing concerns socio-political issues and women's concerns in general. The Indian State of Kashmir constitutes the backdrop of most of her writings, especially terrorism and the repercussions of it, notably the mass exodus of the majority community of "Kashmiri Pandits".

Her magnum opus is Katha Satisar [2001]. She has been the recipient of several awards, including the Subramanya Bharati award, awarded by the President of India for her literary work. Her works have also been translated in many Indian languages, and into English. Her novel Ailan Gali Zinda Hai has been translated for the first time in English by Manisha Chaudhry, published by Zubaan Books (an imprint of 'Kaali for Women', Penguin India) as A Street in Srinagar, The translation was shortlisted for the 2012 DSC Prize for South Asian Literature.

Her latest epic Hindi novel, Katha Satisar (published by Rajkamal Publications), has been translated into English by Ranjana Kaul as The Saga of Satisar - published by Zubaan Books.It was Longlisted for the DSC award for South Asian literature in 2018.

Chandrakanta lives in Gurgaon, India

== Awards and honours ==
- Jammu Kashmir Cultural Academy: Best Book Award
  - Arthantar (1982)
  - Ailan Galli Zinda Hai (1986)
  - O Son Kisri (1994)
  - Katha Satisar (2006)
- Haryana Sahitya Academy:
  - Apne Apne Konark (1997)
  - Abbu Ne Kaha Tha (2006)
  - Hashiye Ki Ibarathen (2011)
- Ministry of Human Resources & Development, Govt. of India:
  - Baki Sab Khairiyat Hai (1983)
  - Poshnool Ki Wapasi (1989)
  - Badalte Haalat Mein (2003 – 2004)
- Hindi Academy, Delhi:
  - Katha Satisar (2002)
- Vyas Samman, K. K. Birla Foundation, Delhi:
  - Katha Satisar, Novel (2005)
- Chandrawati Shukla Puraskar, Varanasi:
  - Katha Satisar, Novel (2006)
- Kalpana Chawla Excellence Award for excellence in Hindi Literature (2005)
- Richa Samman, Delhi for Hindi Literature (2006)
- Wagmani Samman (2007)
- Hindi Academy, Delhi Sahityakar Samman (2008)
- Honored by First Lady of India (Mrs. Sharma) (1996)
- Rashtriya Bhasha Gaurav Samman (2006)
- Community Icon Award by All India Kashmiri Samaj (2006)
- Sauhard Samman, Hindi Sansthan, Uttar Pradesh (2008)
- Wagh Devi Puraskar, Kamla Goenka Foundation (2011)
- Bal Mukund Puraskar, Haryana Sahitya Academy (2013)
- Mahatma Gandhi Sahitya Saman, Lucknow (2014)
- DSC Prize for South Asian Literature (2012), shortlist, A Street in Srinagar
- Subramanyam Bharati Sahitya Samman, awarded by the President of India (2017)
- Soordas Sahitya Sadhna Shikhar Samman, awarded by the Haryana Sahitya Academy
- Kala Nidhi Samman, awarded by the Haryana Sahitya Academy

== Works ==
Novels and story collections

- Salakhon Ke Peeche
- Galat Logon Ke Beech
- Poshnool Ki Vapasi
- Ailan Gali Zinda Hai
- Dahleez Per Niyay
- Apne Apne Konark
- O Sonkisri
- Suraj Ugne Tak
- Kothe Par Kaga
- Kali Baraf
- Katha Nagar
- Arthantar
- Katha Satisar
- Antim Sakshya
- Yahan Vitasta Behti Hai
- Baki Sab Khariyat Hai
- Badalte Haalat Mein
- Abbu Ne Kaha Tha
- Tanti Bai
- Raat Mein Saagar
- Alcatraz Dekha
- Anchalik Kahaniyan
- Prem Kahaniyan
- Charchit Kahaniyan
- Yaadgaree Kahaniyan
- Dus Pratinidhi Kahaniyan
- Cheynit Kahaniyan
- Chunihui Kahaniyan
- Lokpriya Kahaniyan
- Katha Samagr (4 volumes)
- Orioles are back
- Srijan Ka Vitan

Poetry

- Yaheen Kahin Aas Paas

Memoirs

- Hashiye Kee Ibaratein
- Mere Bhoj Patr
- Prashno Ke Dayire mein (Interviews)
- Sudhayon Ke Chandh
