= Chitra Mudgal =

Indian writer

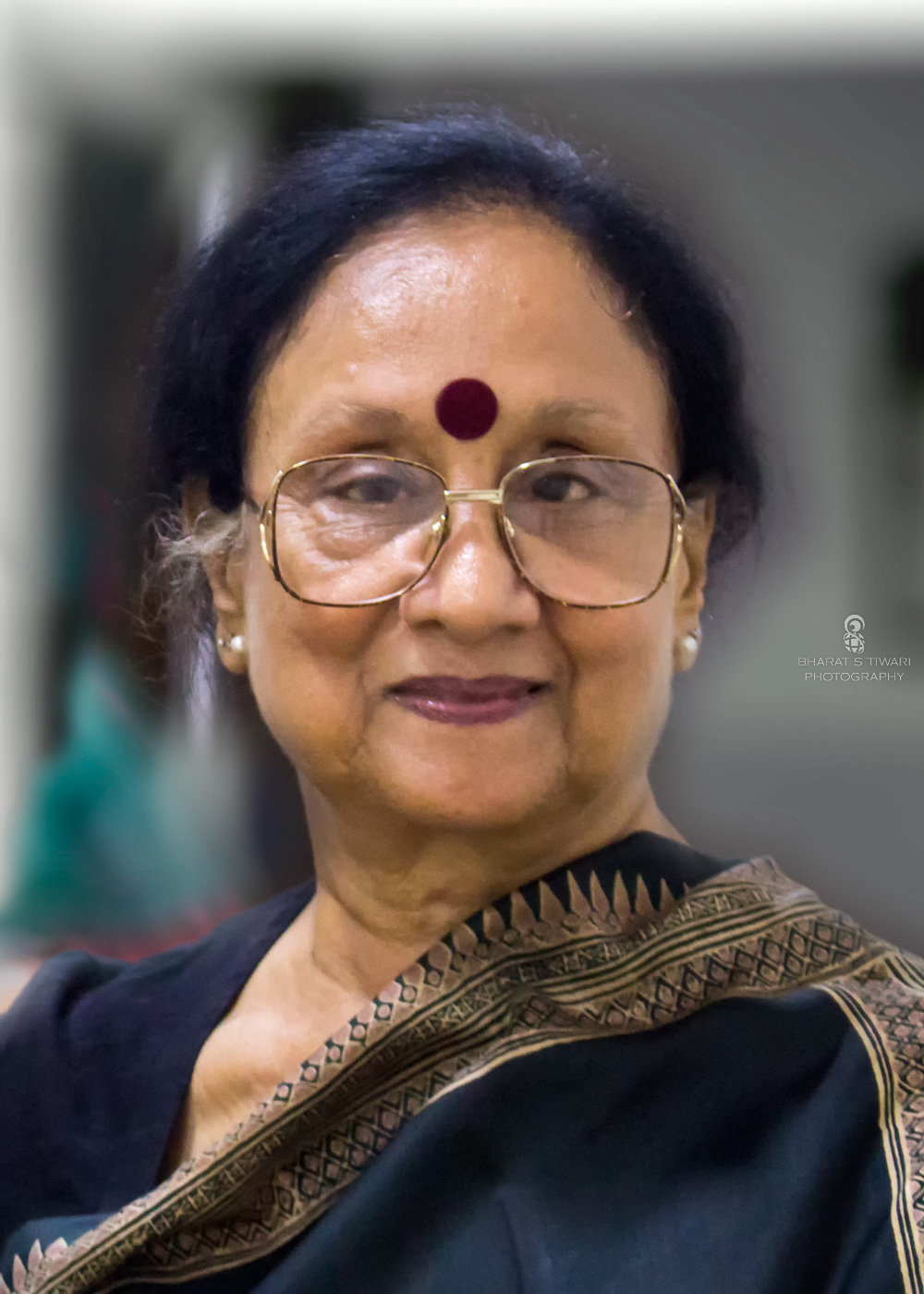
- Born: 10 December 1943 (age 82); Madras, Madras Presidency, British India
- Education: MA in Hindi Literature
- Alma mater: SNDT Women's University
- Occupations: Novelist, writer
- Writing career
- Notable works: Post Box No. 203 – Nala Sopara, Aavaan
- Notable awards: Sahitya Akademi Award Vyas Samman (2003)

Chitra Mudgal (born 10 December 1943) is an Indian writer and one of the leading literary figures of modern Hindi literature.

She is the first Indian woman to receive the coveted Vyas Samman in 2003 for her novel Avaan.

In 2019 she was awarded India's highest literary award, the Sahitya Akademi, for her novel Post Box No. 203, Naalasopara.

== Personal life ==
Chitra Mudgal was born in Chennai on 10 December 1943. She received her M.A. in Hindi Literature from the SNDT Women's University. She married Awadh Narain Mudgal, former Editor of "Sarika", against her father's wish.

== Literary work ==
Her novel 'Aavaan', portrayed the lives and times of the trade union movement when nearly 300,000 workers spearheaded by Datta Samant went on a year long strike of the Mumbai textile mills, which finally saw the collapse of the city's trademark industry. This work has been unanimously acknowledged by the critics as a masterpiece of literary work and stands as a classic novel in Hindi Literature.

The plot of her novel Aavaan was conceived following the murder of a committed trade union leader, Shankar Guha Niyogi. His murder was in fact followed by the murder of another popular unionist of Bombay, Datta Samant. Subsequently, another labour leader of Madhya Pradesh, from Maihar, was killed.

The murder of Datta Samant, who was her guide and philosopher, "shattered her" and became the bases of her novel Aavaan.

== Awards ==
- 2000 – Indu Sharma International Katha Samman for novel 'Aavaan'
- 2003 – Vyas Samman by the K. K. Birla Foundation for her novel 'Aavaan'
- 2018 – Sahitya Akademi Award for her novel "Postbox no.203 Nalasopara".
