= Sunita Jain =

Indian writer (1940–2017)

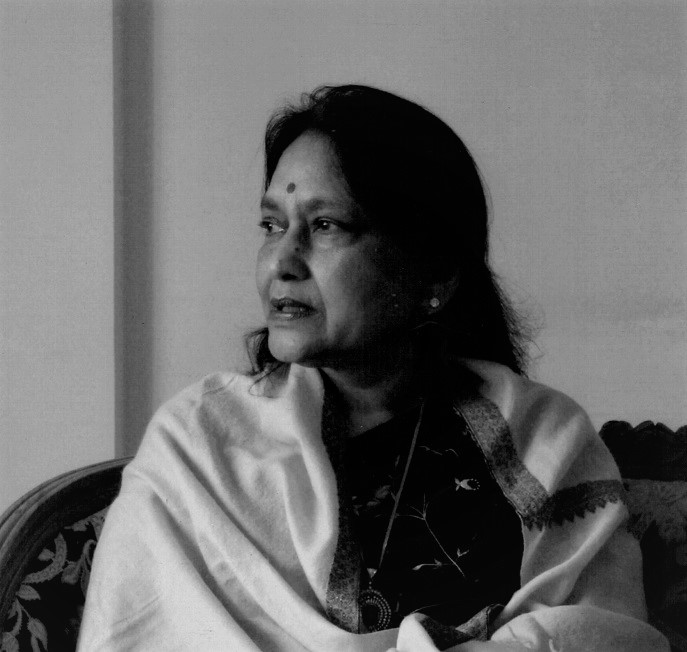
- Born: 13 July 1941; Ambala district, Haryana, India
- Died: 11 December 2017 (aged 76); New Delhi
- Education: BA, MA, PhD
- Alma mater: Indraprastha College for Women (BA); Stony Brook University (MA); University of Nebraska–Lincoln (PhD)
- Occupations: Poet, writer, novelist, scholar
- Years active: 1962 - 2017
- Spouse: Adishwar Lal Jain
- Children: Anu K. Mittal, Ravi K. Jain, Shashi K. Jain
- Awards: Padma Shri; The Vreeland Award (1969); Marie Sandoz Prairie Schooner Fiction Award; Uttar Pradesh Hindi Sansthan Award; Delhi Hindi Academy Award; Nirala Namit Award; Sahityakar Samman; Mahadevi Varma Samman; Prabha Khetan Award; Brahmi Sundari Award; Sulochini Writer Award; UP Sahitya Bhushan Award; The Vyas Samman Award (2015); D.Litt. University of Burdhwan, 2015

Sunita Jain (1941–2017) was an Indian scholar, novelist, short-story writer and poet of English and Hindi literature. She was a former professor and the Head of the Department of Humanities and Social Sciences at the Indian Institute of Technology, Delhi. She published over 80 books, in English and Hindi, besides translating many Jain writings and some Hindi literature into English. She is featured in the Encyclopedia of Post-Colonial Literatures in English and was a recipient of The Vreeland Award (1969) and the Marie Sandoz Prairie Schooner Fiction Award (1970 and 1971). The Government of India awarded her the fourth highest civilian honour of the Padma Shri in 2004. In 2015 she was awarded the Vyas Samman by the K.K. Birla foundation for outstanding literary work in Hindi. In 2015 she was awarded an honorary D.Litt. from the University of Burdhwan, West Bengal.

== Early life and education ==
Born into a Goel Jain family on 13 July 1941 in the Ambala district of the Indian state of Haryana, Sunita's family moved to Delhi when she was a teenager. She completed her B.A. from Indraprastha College for Women, University of Delhi at the age of 18.

She married in Delhi soon after she graduated and left for Cleveland, Ohio, with her husband, after which she spent short stints in Zurich, Switzerland and New Delhi, India, before settling in Stony Brook, Long Island, in 1965. Jain did her post-graduate studies at the State University of New York in American English Literature. In 1968 she moved to Lincoln, Nebraska where she secured a doctoral degree (PhD) from the University of Nebraska–Lincoln.

== Career ==
After returning to India in 1972, after short teaching stints at Indraprastha College and Aurobindo College, she joined the Indian Institute of Technology, Delhi and became the Head of the Department of Humanities and Social Sciences, from where she retired in 2002 as a Professor of English.

While at IIT, Delhi, she encouraged the expansion of the Humanities Department and was instrumental in broadening the degree programs to include a master's and PhD program.

She started writing at the age of 22 and has published short stories, novels and poems in Hindi and English. Her works in English include A Girl of Her Age, a novel published in 2000 and two short story anthologies, A Woman is Dead and Eunuch of Time and Other Stories, published in 1980 and 1982 respectively. She published seven poetry anthologies and some of those poems have been reprinted under the titles, Sensum: Collected Poems 1965-2000 and American Desi and Other Poems. Besides, she has also written a book for children under the name, The Mango Tree (2002) and literary criticism, John Steinbeck's Concept of Man : a Critical Study of his Novels. Her short-stories have been included in two multi-writer short-story collections, Short Short Stories Universal (1993) and Concert of Voices: An Anthology of World Voices in English (1994).

From the mid-1980s Sunita Jain largely focused on writing in Hindi. Her style was personal with very strong feminist underpinnings. She wrote in very refined, pure Hindi, garnering significant recognition and accolades from the Hindi literature community in India and world over. Jain's autobiography has been written in Hindi as also five novels, nine short-story collections, and over fifty poem anthologies and several volumes of poetry collections. As a true bilingual writer, she was often asked to translate other Hindi literature into English. Examples of her religious translations include Inner Light (1999), a five-volume book on religious thoughts, Confluence of Seasons (2010), poems of Kalidasa, and Mukti (2006), poems of Muni Kshamasagar, a Jain holy person. In addition, she has translated Jainendra Kumar's Premchand: A Life and Letters (1993) and Bunty a novel by Mannu Bhandari.

Sunita Jain’s writing has been reviewed and referenced in dozens of publications as well as being the subject of many research publications and doctoral thesis. Several contemporary Hindi literature courses at major universities around the world incorporate the study of her work. After her death, her family published the first translation into English, of a selection of her Hindi poetry Nothing is Lost (2000).

== Awards ==
She received The Vreeland Award of the University of Nebraska–Lincoln in 1969 and Marie Sandoz Prairie Schooner Fiction Award twice, in 1970 and 1971. She was awarded the Uttar Pradesh Hindi Sansthan Award in 1979 and 1980, followed by the Delhi Hindi Academy Award in 1996. The Government of India awarded her the civilian honor of Padma Shri in 2004. She is a recipient of other honors such as Nirala Namit Award (1980), Sahityakar Samman (1996), Mahadevi Varma Samman (1997), Prabha Khetan Award, Brahmi Sundari Award, Sulochini Writer Award and UP Sahitya Bhushan Award. In 2015 she was awarded the Vyas Samman by the K. K. Birla Foundation for her poetry collection Kshama.

== Death and legacy ==
Sunita Jain died in New Delhi on 11 December 2017 after a short battle with a rare blood disorder.

Sunita Jain's collection of writings, awards, private papers, etc., are part of the permanent collection in the archives of Jamia Millia Islamia University at the Premchand Archives & Literary Centre: http://jmi.ac.in/jpalc/collections

In honor of her achievements, her family established the Sunita Jain Literary Award at her alma mater, the University of Nebraska–Lincoln.

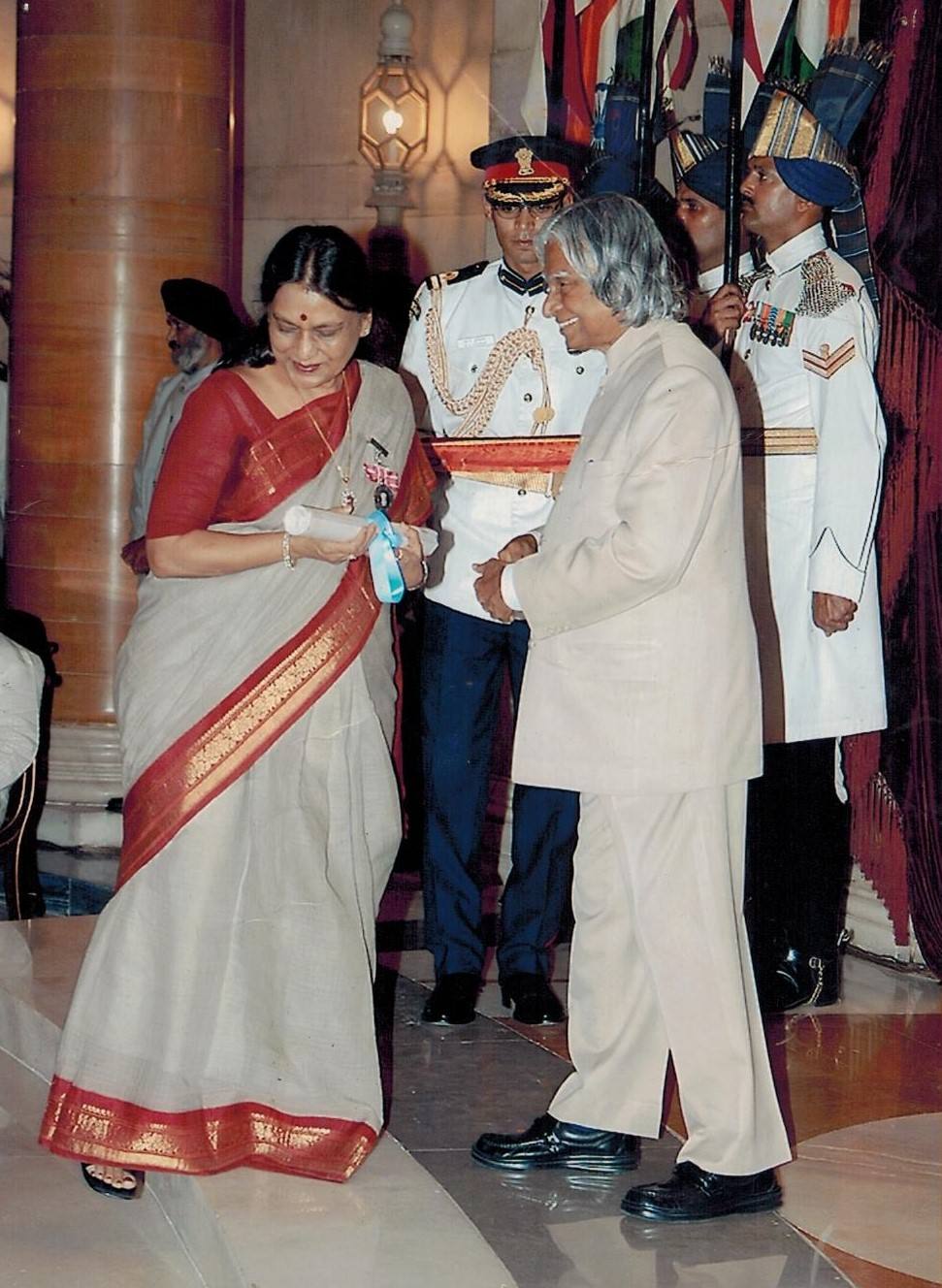
Sunita Jain receiving the Padmashree from Indian President Abdul Kalam, 2004

== Selected works ==
=== In English ===
==== Short Story Anthologies ====
- Sunita Jain (1980). A Woman is Dead. Writers Workshop, Calcutta. p. 73. OCLC 612785046.
- Sunita Jain (1982). Eunuch of Time and Other Stories. Vikas Publishers. p. 83. ISBN 9780706918816.

==== Novel ====
- Sunita Jain (2000). A Girl of Her Age. Atma Ram & Sons. p. 106. ASIN B0061SI354.

==== Other Published Work ====
- Sunita Jain (1979). John Steinbeck's Concept of Man : a Critical Study of his Novels. New Statesman Pub. Co. p. 101. OCLC 5945681.
- Jainendra Kumar, Sunita Jain (translator) (1993). Premchand: A Life and Letters.
- Sunita Jain (2002). The Mango Tree. Orient Blackswan. p. 25. ISBN 9788125022695.
- Muni Kshamasagara, Sunita Jain (translator) (2006). Mukti. Remadhava Publication, p. 128.
- Kalidas, Sunita Jain (translator) (2010). Confluence of Seasons. Kitabghar Prakashan. ISBN 9789380146683.

==== Poetry Anthologies and Collections ====
- Sunita Jain (1978). Man of My Desires. Writers Workshop, Calcutta, p. 31.
- Sunita Jain (1979). Between You & God. Writers Workshop, Calcutta, p. 29.
- Sunita Jain (1979). Beneath the Frost. Indian Literary Review, New Delhi, p. 48.
- Sunita Jain (1980). Lovetime. Gulab Vazirani for Arnold-Heinemann Publishers, New Delhi, p. 48.
- Sunita Jain. (1982). Silences. National Publishing House, New Delhi, p. 48.
- Sunita Jain and John Anderson (1984). Find Me With Rain. Amrit Publishing House, New Delhi.
- Sunita Jain (1986). Till I find Myself. Sterling Publishers, New Delhi. p. 95. OCLC 568753716.
- Sunita Jain (2000). Sensum: Collected Poems 1965–2000. Myword! Press. p. 158. OCLC 156892219.
- Sunita Jain (2007). American Desi and Other Poems. Read Books. p. 72. ISBN 9788190475310.

=== In Hindi ===
==== Poetry Anthologies ====
- Sunita Jain (1978). Ho Jaane Do Mukt. Abhiruchi Prakashan.
- Sunita Jain (1980). Kaun Sa Aakash. Abhiruchi Prakashan. p. 60. OCLC 6864318
- Sunita Jain (1983). Ek Aur Din. Abhivyanjana Prakashan, New Delhi, p. 88. OCLC 17984763.
- Sunita Jain (1986). Rang Rati. National Publishing House, New Delhi.
- Sunita Jain (1988). Kitna Jal. National Publishing House, New Delhi.
- Sunita Jain (1996). Kaatar Bela. National Publishing House, New Delhi, p. 117. ISBN 81-214-0585-8
- Sunita Jain (1995). Sutradhar Sote Hain. Abhiruchi Prakashan.
- Sunita Jain (1995). Sach Kehti Hoon. Abhivyanjana Prakashan.
- Sunita Jain (1995). Kahan Milogi Kavita. SatSahitya Prakashan, Delhi, p. 108. ISBN 81-85830-20-7
- Sunita Jain (1995). Yug Kyon Hotey Aur Nahin. Purvodaya Prakashan, New Delhi. p. 96. ISBN 81-7037-127
- Sunita Jain (1995). Suno Madhu Kiśvara. Ayana Prakāśana. p. 91. ISBN 9788174080424.
- Sunita Jain (1995). Dhoop Hatiley Man Ki. Praveen Prakashan, New Delhi, p. 95.
- Sunita Jain (1995). Is Akeley Taar Par. Kitab Ghar, New Delhi, p. 104. ISBN 81-7016-280-7
- Sunita Jain (1996). Paun Fatey Ka Pehla Pakshi. National Publishing House, New Delhi.
- Sunita Jain (1996). Mukhman Karoti Vaachal. Praveen Prakashan.
- Sunita Jain (1996). Jane Laraki Pagli. Samānāntara Prakāśana. p. 159. OCLC 610139227.
- Sunita Jain (1996). Seedhi Kalam Sadhey Na. Kitab Ghar.
- Sunita Jain (1996). Ji Karta Hain. Abhiruchi Prakashan.
- Sunita Jain (1997). Lekin Ab. Ayan Prakashan.
- Sunita Jain (1997). Bolo Tum Hi. Ayan Prakashan.
- Sunita Jain (1998). Itna Bhar Samaya. Sarthak Prakashan.
- Sunita Jain (1998). Hathkadri Mein Chaand. Praveen Prakashan.
- Sunita Jain (1998). Ganga Tat Dekha. Vani Prakashan Publisher, p. 108. ISBN 978-8170556367.
- Sunita Jain (2003). Suno Kahani. Read India Books.
- Sunita Jain (2003). Taru Taru Ki Dal Pe. Read India Books.
- Sunita Jain (2003). Teesri Chitthi. Siddharth Publishers.
- Sunita Jain (2003). Jo Main Janti. Sarthak Prakashan.
- Sunita Jain (2004). Doosre Din. Bibliophile South Asia, New Delhi, p. 48. ISBN 81-85002-37-1
- Sunita Jain (2006). Chowkhat Par Va Uttho Madhvi. Medha Books, ISBN 978-8181661623.
- Sunita Jain (2006). Prem Mein Stri. Remadhav Publications, ISBN 978-8189850081.
- Sunita Jain (2007). Barish Mein Dilli. Medha Books. p. 96. ISBN 978-8181662095.
- Sunita Jain (2007). Is Baar. Sarswati Sadan, ISBN 978-8121612432.
- Sunita Jain (2007). Khali Ghar Mein. Aalok Parv Publishing.
- Sunita Jain (2007). Laal Ribbon Ka Phulva. Antika Prakshan, Delhi, p. 96. ISBN 978-81-905148-0-4.
- Sunita Jain (2007). KIssa Tota Maina Ka. Antika Prakshan.
- Sunita Jain (2007). Fantasy. Antika Prakashan, ISBN 978-8190608145.
- Sunita Jain (2008). Kshama. Remadhav Publications. p. 80. ISBN 9788189914684.
- Sunita Jain (2008). Luon Ke Behaal Dino Mein. Antika Prakashan, p. 112. ISBN 978-8190656726.
- Sunita Jain (2010). Auk Bhar Jal. Remadhav Publications, ISBN 978-8189962456
- Sunita Jain (2010). Heyrva. Antika Prakashan, p. 96, ISBN 978-9380044347.
- Sunita Jain (2010). Rasoi Ki Khidki Mein. Antika Prakashan. p. 104. ISBN 978-9380044354.
- Sunita Jain (2012). Hooee Sanjh Ki Bair. Remadhav Publications, Ghaziabad. p. 96. ISBN 978-93-81297-03-2
- Sunita Jain (2012). Tho Bhi. Aakarti Prakashan p. 96, ISBN 978-9380771151
- Sunita Jain (2013). Suraj Chupne Se Pehley. Image India Publisher, p. 96. ISBN 978-8190983389.
- Sunita Jain (2013). Agar Kabhi Lauti Tho. Image India Publisher, p. 96, ISBN 978-9382770022.
- Sunita Jain (2013). Tayshun Saare. Sabhya Prakashan New Delhi. p. 104. ISBN 978-81-907340-6-6
- Sunita Jain (2014). Saun Tanch Maal. Bodhi Prakashan, Jaipur. p. 96. ISBN 978-93-83878-96-3
- Sunita Jain (2015). Kanton Bhari Bel Mein. Sabhya Prakashan, Delhi. p. 104. ISBN 978-93-83785-22-3.
- Sunita Jain (2017). Aise Jaane Dena. Ananya Prakashan, Delhi. p 128. ISBN 978-93-87145-06-1

==== Poetry Collections ====
- Sunita Jain (1997). Yeh Kavita Ka Kanta. National Publishing House, New Delhi.
- Sunita Jain (1998). Chaya Kahin Bardhi Hain. Purvodaya Prakashan.
- Sunita Jain (1999). Kahi Par (3 volumes). Vani Prakashan.
- Sunita Jain (2003). Sunita Jain: Ab Tak (8 volumes). Sarthik Prakashan. ISBN 8181600002
- Sunita Jain (2010). Sunita Jain: Samagrha (14 volumes). Remadhav Publications, Ghaziabad.
- Sunita Jain (2013). Raag Aur Aag. Anya Prakashan, Delhi. p. 240. ISBN 978-93-81997-25-3

==== Novels ====
- Sunita Jain (1966). Bojyu. Hindi Pocket Books.
- Sunita Jain (1966). Bindu. Hindi Pocket Books.
- Sunita Jain (1977). Safar Ke Saathi. Abhiruchi Prakashan.
- Sunita Jain (1977). Marnatith. Abhiruchi Prakashan.
- Sunita Jain (1977). Anugunj. Abhiruchi Prakashan.
- Sunita Jain (2016). Un Dino (all 5 novels). Ananya Prakashan. ISBN 978-9385450440

==== Short story collections ====
- Sunita Jain (1970). Hum Mohrey Din Raat Ke. Purvodaya Prakashan.
- Sunita Jain (1977). Itne Barso Baad. Purvodaya Prakashan.
- Sunita Jain (2007). Ya Isliye. Remadhav Publication, Ghaziabad. ISBN 978-8189914172
- Sunita Jain (2009). Paanch Din. Penguin. p. 130. ISBN 978-9353491079.
- Sunita Jain (2000). Palna. Star Books.
- Sunita Jain (2008). Birku Chacha. Antika Prakashan, p. 112. ISBN 978-8190656740
- Sunita Jain (2009). Sunita Jain Ki Prem Kahniya. Naman Prakashan.
- Sunita Jain (2010). Sunita Jain Ki Yaadgari Kahniya. Hindi Pocket Books.
- Sunita Jain (2017). Sunita Jain Ki Lokpriya Kahniya. Prabhat Prakashan. p. 184. ISBN 978-9386300485

==== Autobiography ====
- Sunita Jain (2005). Shabdkaya. Sarsawati Vihar, Noida, p. 114. ISBN 81-216-1050-8

==== Selected Translations from Hindi to English ====
- Manu Bhandari’s novel Bunty, Sunita Jain (translator) 1974. Akshara Prakashan.
- Jainendra Kumar’s book Premchand Ek Kriti Vykitthatva, (Premchand: A Life and Letters) Sunita Jain (translator) 1993. Y.K. Publishers.
- Muni Kshamsagar’s poetry collection Mukti, Sunita Jain (translator) 2010. Remadhav Publication.
- Kalidasa’s poetry collection, Ritusahar (Confluence of Seasons) Sunita Jain (translator) 2010. Kitab Ghar.

== See also ==
- State University of New York
- University of Nebraska–Lincoln
