= Vyas Samman =

Literary award in India

The Vyas Samman is a literary award in India, first awarded in 1991. It is awarded annually by the K.K. Birla Foundation and includes a cash payout of ₹ 4,00,000 (as of 2019).

To be eligible for the award, the literary work must be in the Hindi language and have been published in the past 10 years.

Four recipients of Vyas Samman -- Kunwar Narayan (1995), Kedarnath Singh (1997), Shrilal Shukla (1999), and Amarkant (2009) -- went on to win the Jnanpith Award, considered the highest Indian literary honor, in 2005, 2013, 2009, and 2009, respectively.

Two recipients of Vyas Samman -- Vishwanath Prasad Tiwari (2011) and Vishwanath Tripathi (2013) -- received Moortidevi Award, considered the second highest after the Jnanpith Award, in 2019 and 2014, respectively.

Two recipients of Vyas Samman -- Govind Mishra (1997) and Ramdarash Mishra (2011) -- received Saraswati Samman, considered the highest awarded by the same K.K. Birla Foundation, in 2013 and 2021, respectively.

Starting with Chitra Mudgal in 2003, nine women have won the award so far.

== Recipients ==
The people who have been awarded the Vyas Samman are:

Year	Awardee	Work	Type	Ref.
2024	Suryabala	Kaun Des Ko Vasi: Venu Ki Diary	Novel	
2023	Pushpa Bharati	Yaadein, Yaadein!...Aur Yaadein	Memoir	
2022	Gyan Chaturvedi	Pagalkhana	Novel	
2021	Asghar Wajahat	Mahabali	Play	
2020	Sharad K. Pagare	Patliputra ki Samragi	Novel	
2019	Nasira Sharma	Kagaz Ki Naav	Novel	
2018	Leeladhar Jagudi	Jitne Log Utne Prem	Novel	
2017	Mamta Kalia	Dukkham Sukkham	Novel	
2016	Surendra Verma	Kaatna shami ka vriksha padma-pankhuri ki dhar se	Novel	
2015	Sunita Jain	Kshama	Poetry	
2014	Kamal Kishore Goyenka	Premchand Kee Kahaniyon Kaa Kaal Kramanusar Adhyan		
2013	Vishwanath Tripathi	Vyomkesh Darvesh	Memoir	
2012	Narendra Kohli	Na Bhooto Na Bhavishyati	Novel	
2011	Ramdarash Mishra	Aam K Patte	Poetry	
2010	Vishwanath Prasad Tiwari	Phir Bhi Kuch Rah Jayega	Poetry	
2009	Amar Kant	Inhi Hathiyaron Se		
2008	Mannu Bhandari	Ek Kahani Yah Bhi	Autobiography	
2007	No awards	No awards	No awards	
2006	Parmanand Srivastava	Kavita Ki Arthaat		
2005	Chandrakanta	Katha Satisar	Novel	
2004	Mridula Garg	Kath Gulab		
2003	Chitra Mudgal	Anwan		
2002	Kailash Vajpeyi	Prithvi Ka Krishna Paksh		
2001	Ramesh Chandra Shah	Aalochana ka paksh		
2000	Giriraj Kishore	Pehla Girimitya		
1999	Sri Lal Sukla	Bisarampur Ka Sant		
1998	Govind Mishra	Paanch Aanganon wala Ghar		
1997	Kedarnath Singh	Uttar Kabir Tatha Anya Kavitaen	Poetry	
1996	Ramswarup Chaturvedi	Hindi Sahitya aur Samvedna ka Vikas		
1995	Kunwar Narayan	Koi Dusra Nahin	Poetry	
1994	Dharamvir Bharati	Sapna Abhi Bhi	Poetry	
1993	Girija Kumar Mathur	Main Waqt ke Hoon Samane	Poetry	
1992	Shiv Prasaad Singh	Neela Chand	Novel	
1991	Ram Vilas Sharma	Bharat ke Pracheen bhasha parivar aur Hindi		

== See also ==
- Jnanpith Award, another annual literary award, regarded as the highest Indian literary honor and conferred by the Bharatiya Jnanpith.
- Moortidevi Award, another annual literary honor, regarded as the second highest, and also awarded by the Bharatiya Jnanpith.
- Saraswati Samman, a similar literary award in all official Indian languages and also conferred by the K. K. Birla Foundation.
