= Sanatan (novel) =

2024 by Sharankumar Limbale

- Author: Sharankumar Limbale
- Translator: Paromita Sengupta
- Language: Marathi
- Genre: Historical novel
- Publisher: Penguin India (English translation)
- Publication date: 2018
- Publication place: India
- English publication date: 2024
- Media type: Print

Sanatan is a novel by the Indian Dalit writer Sharankumar Limbale, written in Marathi and translated into English by Paromita Sengupta. It is a historical novel that follows the Mahar community across several generations, tracing their experience of caste oppression from the pre-colonial period into the twentieth century. The original Marathi novel won the Saraswati Samman in 2020, and the English translation was shortlisted for the 2024 JCB Prize.

== Background and publication ==
Sharankumar Limbale is a Marathi Dalit writer with more than forty published works, known for his autobiography Akkarmashi and his critical study Towards an Aesthetic of Dalit Literature. He was the first Dalit writer to receive the Saraswati Samman, one of India's major literary awards, which he won in 2020 for Sanatan. The novel was first published in Marathi in 2018, and Paromita Sengupta's English translation was published by Penguin India in 2024.

== Plot ==
The novel centres on Bhimnak Mahar and his descendants, moving from one member of the Mahar community to another rather than following a single protagonist. It depicts the daily humiliations of caste, including unpaid menial labour and the sexual exploitation of Mahar women, and sets the family's story against historical events such as the 1818 Battle of Koregaon, the 1857 rebellion, and religious conversion among the Mahars.

== Reception ==
Reviewing the translation for Scroll.in, the critic called the book an important record of caste violence, while observing that, having passed through more than one translation, the English text does not always read smoothly. In the Deccan Chronicle, the reviewer described it as a history of the present and praised its attention to events that mainstream histories had sidelined, but found that the novel struggled to balance its historical material with the folklore of its early chapters. The novel was shortlisted for the 2024 JCB Prize.
