= Kunwar Narayan =

Indian poet (1927-2017)

- Born: 19 September 1927; Faizabad, United Provinces, British India
- Died: 15 November 2017 (aged 90); New Delhi, India
- Occupation: Poet
- Writing career
- Notable awards: Sahitya Akademi Award in Hindi (1995) Jnanpith Award in 2005

Kunwar Narayan (19 September 1927 – 15 November 2017) was a poet in Indian literature in Hindi. He read and traveled widely and wrote for six decades. He was linked to the New Poetry movement. He obtained a Master of Arts in English literature from the University of Lucknow in 1951.

== Death ==
He died on 15 November 2017 at the age of 90.

== Works ==
=== Poetry ===
- Chakravyūh (Circular Siege), 1956. Radhakrishan, Delhi (first published by Rajkamal Prakashan).
- Tīsrā Saptak (Third Heptad), seven poets, ed. Agyeya, 1959. Bharatiya Jnanpith, Delhi.
- P: Hum-Tum (Surroundings: Us-You), 1961. Vani Prakashan, Delhi (first published by Bharti Bhandar, Allahabad).
- Apné Sāmné (In Front of Us), 1979. Rajkamal Prakashan, Delhi.
- Koī Dūsrā Nahīn (No One the Other), 1993. Rajkamal Prakashan, Delhi.
- In Dino (These Days), 2002. Rajkamal Prakashan, Delhi.
- Vājaśravā ke bahāne, 2008
- Hāśiye kā gavāh, 2009

=== Epic poems ===
- Ātmajayī (Self-Conqueror), based on the Upanishadic episode of Nachikétā in Kathopnishad, 1965. Bharatiya Jnanpith, Delhi.
- Vājashravā Ké Bahāné (On Vajashrava's Pretext), independent poems linked to Ātmajayī's context, 2008. Bharatiya Jnanpith.

=== Fiction ===
- Ākāron Ké Ās-Pās (Near-about Shapes), a collection of short stories, 1973. Radhakrishan Prakashan, Delhi.

=== Criticism ===
- Āj Aur Āj Sé Pahlé (Today and Before Today), 1998. Rajkamal Prakashan, Delhi.
- Méré Sākshātkār (My Interviews), interviews given by Kunwar Narain, ed. Vinod Bhardwaj, 1999. Kitabghar Prakashan, Delhi.
- Sāhitya Ké Kuchh Antar-Vishayak Sandarbh (Some Interdisciplinary Contexts of Literature), XIV Samvatsar Lecture, 2003. Sahitya Akademi.

=== Translations ===
- Selected poems of and essay on Constantine Cavafy, 'Tanāv', 1986 and Jorge-Luis Borges, 'Tanāv', 1987.
- Selected poems of Stéphane Mallarmé, Tadeusz Różewicz, Derek Walcott, Zbigniew Herbert, Anna Świrszczyńska, etc.

=== Compilations ===
- Kunwar Nārāin: Sansār-I (World: Select writings of Kunwar Narain), ed. Yatindra Mishra, 2002. Vani Prakashan, Delhi.
- Kunwar Nārāin: Upasthiti-II (Presence: Select articles on Kunwar Narain and his writings), ed. Y Mishra, 2002. Vani Prakashan.
- Kunwar Nārāin: Chunī Huī Kavitāyein (Selected Poems), ed. Suresh Salil, 2007. Medha Books, Delhi.
- Kunwar Nārāin: Pratinidhī Kavitāyein (Representative Poems), ed. Purshottam Agarwal, 2008. Rajkamal Prakashan, Delhi.

== Awards and recognition ==
- Vyas Samman (1995)
- Jnanpith Award (considered as the highest literary award in India), for overall contribution in Hindi literature, 2005
- Padma Bhushan the third highest civilian award in the Republic of India for 'Literature & Education', 2009

== Foreign translations ==
- Modern Hindi Poetry: An Anthology, ed. Vidya N. Misra, 1965, Indiana Univ. Press, Bloomington & London. (English translation by Leonard Nathan & H M Guy)
- Tokyo University Journal, No. 7, December 1972, Hindi Dept., Tokyo Univ. of Foreign Studies, Nishigahara, Kita-ku, Tokyo (Japanese translation by Toshio Tanaka)
- Der Ochsenkarren, Hindilyrik der siebziger und achtziger Jahre, Zusammengestellt von Vishnu Khare & Lothar Lutze, Verlag Wolf Mersch, 1983 (German transl.)
- Kunvar Narayan, Naciketa, A cura di Mariola Offredi, Plural Edizioni, Napoli. Collezione di Poesia I Cristalli, 1989, (Italian translation of Atmajayee)
- The Golden Waist Chain: Modern Hindi Short Stories, ed. Sara Rai, 1990, Penguin. (English translation by Sara Rai)
- TriQuarterly 77, Winter 1989/90, ed. Reginald Gibbons, 1990, Northwestern University, US (English translation by Vinay Dharwadker)
- Periplus: Poetry in Translation, eds. Daniel Weissbort & Arvind K. Mehrotra, 1993, Oxford Univ. Press. (English translations by Daniel Weissbort & the poet)
- The Penguin New Writing in India, eds. Aditya Behl & David Nicholls, 1994, Penguin India, First published by Chicago Review (Vol. 38, Nos1 & 2), 1992
- Survival, eds. Daniel Weissbort & Girdhar Rathi. Sahitya Akademi, India, 1994 (English translations by Daniel Weissbort & the poet)
- The Oxford Anthology of Modern Indian Poetry, eds. Vinay Dharwadker & A.K. Ramanujan, 1994, Oxford University Press (English translations)
- Yatra 2: Writings from The Indian Subcontinent, General Ed.: Alok Bhalla, Eds. Nirmal Verma & U R Ananthamurthy, 1994, Indus (English trans., Alok Bhalla)
- Living Literature: A Trilingual Documentation of Indo-German Literary Exchange, eds. Barbara Lotz and Vishnu Khare (German translations)
- Gestures: Poetry from SAARC Countries, Edited by K. Satchidanandan, 1996 (Reprint 2001), Sahitya Akademi, India (English)
- An Anthology of Modern Hindi Poetry, ed. Kailash Vajpeyi, 1998, Rupa & Co., India (English translations)
- Dilli Mein Kavita, ed. Kailash Vajpeyi, translated into Russian by Varyam Singh, 1999, Sahitya Kala Parishad, Delhi (Russian translations)
- Poeti Hindi: Antologia del Novecento, A cura di Mariola Offredi, Casta Diva, Roma. 2000. Poesia, Collana diretta da Enrico D’Angelo (Italian translations)
- Kunvar Narayan, Nessuno è altro, A cura di Roberta Sequi, Casta Diva, Roma. 2001. (Italian translation of Koee Doosra Nahin)
- Beyond Borders: An Anthology of SAARC Poetry, eds. Ashok Vajpeyi & Ajeet Cour, 2002, Academy of Fine Arts and Literature & Rainbow Publishers.
- Ze współczesnej poezji Hindi, Przegląd Orientalistyczny, vol. 202-203, no. 3-4, Warszawa, 2002, translated by Danuta Stasik. (Polish translations)
- Hindi: Handpicked Fictions, Edited and translated by Sara Rai, 2003, Katha, Delhi. (English translations)
- New Poetry in Hindi (Nayi Kavita): An anthology edited, translated and introduced by Lucy Rosenstein, 2003, Permanent Black, Delhi. (English translations)
- Cracow Indological Studies Vol. 6, ed. Renata Czekalska, Jagiellonian Univ., Kraków, 2005. (Polish translations, Renata Czekalska & Agnieszka Kuczkiewicz-Fraś)
- Kunwar Narain, Varco di ombre, a cura di Tullia Baldassarri Höger von Högersthal, edizione Mura, 2006 (Italian translation of selected poems)
- Ik zag de stad, Moderne Hindi-poëzie, Vertaald en ingeleid door Lodewijk Brunt & Dick Plukker, Stichting India Instituut, Amsterdam, 2006 (Dutch translation)
- Teaching on India in Central and Eastern Europe, eds. Danuta Stasik & Anna Trynkowska, Warsaw, 2007 (Polish translations by Danuta Stasik)
- Kunwar Narain, Przez Słowa, Antologia pod redakcją Renaty Czekalskiej i Agnieszki Kuczkiewicz-Fraś, Księgarnia Akademicka, Kraków, 2007 (Polish translation)
- Kunwar Narain. No Other World: Selected Poems, translated by Apurva Narain, Rupa & Co., India, 2008. (English translation)
- Kunwar Narajan. Wiersze, w przekładzie Danuty Stasik, DIALOG, Warszawa 2013 (Polish translation)
