= Sharankumar Limbale =

Marathi writer

- Born: June 1, 1956 (age 70)
- Occupations: Writer, poet, literary critic
- Spouse: Kusum
- Writing career
- Language: Marathi
- Genre: Dalit literature
- Notable work: Akkarmashi (1984) Towards an Aesthetics of Dalit Literature (2004)
- Notable awards: Saraswati Samman

Sharankumar Limbale (born June 1, 1956) is a Marathi language author, poet and literary critic. He has penned more than 40 books. His best known work is his autobiography Akkarmashi published in 1984. Akkarmashi has been translated to several other Indian languages and English. The English translation has been published by the Oxford University Press with the title The Outcaste.

His critical work Towards an Aesthetics of Dalit Literature (2004) is considered amongst the most important works on Dalit literature. It discusses how Dalit anubhava (experiences) should take precedence over anuman (speculation).

== Life ==
Sharankumar Limbale was born on 1 June 1956 at Hennur village of Solapur district, in Maharashtra. He completed his MA in Marathi Language from Shivaji University, Kolhapur. After completing his MA, he did his Ph.D. on "Marathi Dalit Literature and American Black Literature – A Comparative Study".

Limabale joined as an Assistant Editor in the Publications Department of Yashwantrao Chavan University of Maharashtra Open University, Nashik; later he retired as Professor and Director of this University.

== Awards and honours ==
- Saraswati Samman, 2020

== Bibliography ==
- Akkarmashi (English translation: The Outcaste), 1984 — His autobiography which was published when he was 25 years old. It is a critically acclaimed work considered a landmark in Dalit literature.
- Udrek
- Uplya
- O
- Gavkusabaheril katha
- Jhund
- Dangal
- Dalit Aatmakatha - Ek Akalan
- Dalit Brahman
- Dalit Panther
- Dalit Premkavita (literally meaning "Dalit Love Poems")
- Dalit Brahman
- Dalit Sahitya Aani Soundarya (literally meaning "Dalit Literature and Beauty")
- Dalit Sahityache Soundaryashastra (literally meaning "The Aesthetics of Dalit Literature")
- Punha Akkarmashi
- Pradnyasurya—Biography of Dr Babasaheb Ambedkar
- Bahujan
- Sanatan (novel)

== Notes and references ==
Interview with Jaydeep Sarangi, JSL, 2012/13 (Autumn), JNU, New Delhi.
