= S.R. Harnot =

Indian writer

- Born: January 22, 1955 (age 71); Chanawag, Tehsil Seoni, Shimla District
- Citizenship: Indian

S.R. Harnot ( Sant Ram Harnot )born 22 January 1955) is a creative writer from Himachal Pradesh, India. He is noted for his numerous poems, short stories, and novels in Hindi and Pahadi. He has received multiple awards on the state, national, and international levels. His is work has inspired both a considerable body of scholarship and a number of adaptations in various artistic forms by others. Harnot writes mostly about societal issues such as socio-cultural change, casteism, environmental degradation, corporate greed, and official corruption in the everyday life of contemporary rural western Himalayas.

== Personal life ==
Harnot was born in village Chanawag, Tehsil Seoni, Shimla District. While growing up he faced a lot of financial constraints, but eventually had a successful career. He worked at the Himachal Pradesh Tourism Development Corporation for 36 years till 2013, retiring as Deputy General Manager. Prior to that, he had worked for some time at the Industries Department.

Harnot holds an MA in Hindi, a BA (Hons) in Hindi, and a Diploma in PR, Advertising and Journalism.

Harnot's son Girish Harnot is an actor, writer, and director.

== Works ==
Harnot is the author of several short story collections. These include Panja, Aakashbel, Peeth Par Pahad, Darosh tatha anya kahaniyaan, Jeenkathi Tatha Anya Kahaniyan, Mitti Ke Log, Lytton Block Gir Raha Hai, Keelein, Bhaga Devi ka Chaighar. Nadi gayab hai, Dus Pratinidhi Kahaniyan and Aadhar chayan kahaniyan. His novels include Hidimb (2011)and Nadi rang jaisi ladki (2022). He has also written certain works based on culture and travel in Himachal Pradesh. These include Himachal ke mandir aur unse judi lok kathayein (1991); Himachal at a glance (2000), and Yatra: Kinnaur, Spiti, Lahaul, aur Manimahesh par sanskritik aur aetihasik yatraein (1987).

== Views ==
Harnot is critical of the widespread caste discrimination in Himachal Pradesh, a theme he has engaged with both creatively and through activism. In January 2022, he launched the book Hindi dalit sahitya: vimarsh ke ayine mein, an anthology on contemporary Dalit writings in Hindi edited by Dr. Surendra Sharma.

In 2007, Harnot offered to provide the Bangladeshi writer Taslima Nasreen refuge at his home, a time when Nasreen was facing flak due to her controversial writings about Islam.

== Recognition ==
Some of the early awards won by Harnot include the Bhartendu Harish Chandra Award, the Creative News National Award, Himachal Kesari Award, and Himachal Gaurav Award. Other awards include the Himachal State Akademi Award, the 'Award for Tourism and Literature' from the Himachal Pradesh Tourism Development Corporation, and 'the Fiction Writer of the Year Award' by Divya Himachal Daily Newspaper.

As of 1 October 2018, his work had been the subject of three PhDs and 17 MPhil dissertations at various Indian universities.

Some particular recognitions include the following:

- Harnot's book 'Himachal ke mandir aur unse judi lok kathayein' (The temples of Himachal and the folk tales associated with them), originally published in 1991, has been digitally archived on archive.org.
- In 2003, Harnot was awarded the Indu Sharma katha samman.
- In 2010, Harnot was awarded the Hindi Sewa Samman.
- In 2012, he was awarded the Jagdish Chandra Smriti Award.
- In 2012, the Bollywood actor Anupam Kher organised a month-long theater workshop in Shimla's Gaiety Theater based on Harnot's short story 'Bezuban'.
- In 2014, Mariola Offredi, a researcher from Italy, presented a paper titled 'The effects of glocalization on the mountain villages of Himachal Pradesh: an analysis of the Hindi short stories of S.R. Harnot' at the 23rd European Conference on South Asian Studies. In 2012, Offredi had translated and presented Harnot's short story 'a manav' at a literary conference in Lisbon.
- in 2018, 'Cats Talk', an anthology of 12 short stories by Harnot translated into English, was published by Cambridge Scholars (UK).
- In 2021, Harnot's short story 'Ma padhti hai' was translated into English as 'Ma reads' and published in the Frontline magazine in the January issue.
- In 2022 (August), Harnot was the convener of the 'Bhalku smriti literary yatra', a journey along the historic Kalka-Shimla railway line involving recitals of stories, memories, poetry, and music.
