= Surendra Verma =

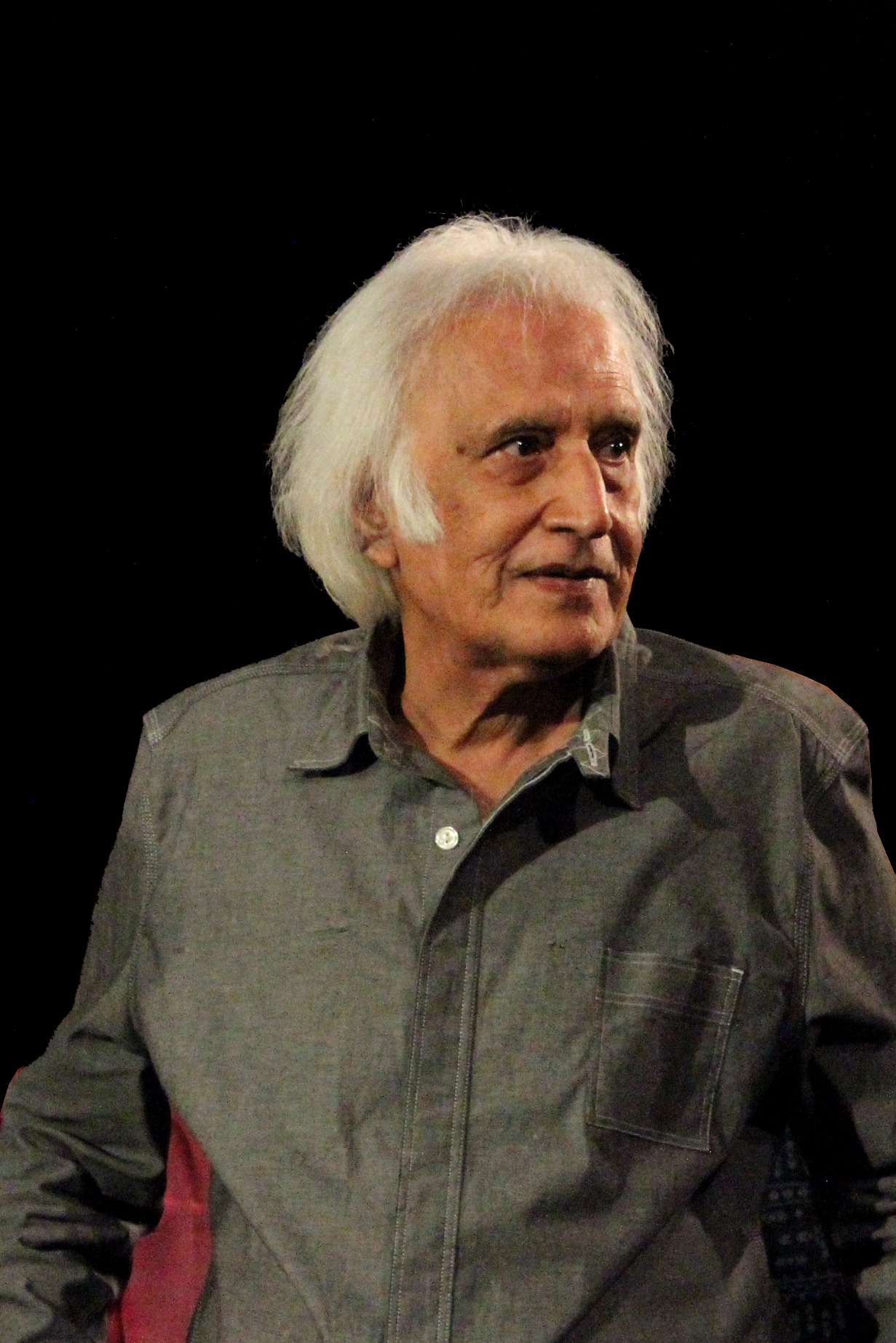
- After watching play Shakuntala ki Anguthi at Bharat Bhavan Bhopal
- Born: 7 September 1941 (age 85); Jhansi, United Provinces, British India
- Occupations: writer, playwright

Surendra Verma (born 7 September 1941) is a leading Hindi litterateur and playwright. He started out as a playwright, when his play Surya Ki Antim Kiran Se Surya Ki Pahli Kiran Tak (From sunset to sunrise, 1972) became quite well known; it has been translated into six Indian languages. He has had a long association with the National School of Drama and has published about fifteen titles of short stories, satires, novels and plays.

He has won the Sangeet Natak Akademi Award (1993), Sahitya Akademi Award (1996), and Vyas Samman (2016).

== Early life and education ==
Born in Jhansi, he is an M.A. in linguistics. He has 4 brothers and a sister. One of his brothers, Ravindra Verma, also writes. So does his sister-in-law.

== Career ==
He started his career as a teacher and soon started writing stories. His first play, Surya ki antim kiran sesurya kipahli kiran tak (From the Sun's Last Ray to the Sun's First Ray`) was premiered in Marathi by Amol Palekar in 1972.

Nind Kyon Rat Bhar Nahin Ati (`Why Doesn't Sleep Stay the Whole Night) published in 1976, anthologizes his short plays. Qaid-e-Hayat talks about the personal life of poet Mirza Ghalib, including his financial hardships and his tragic love for Katiba, a woman calligraphist, who was working on his diwan.

== Works ==
=== Novels ===
- Do Murdon Ke Liye Guldasta (2000)
- Mujhe Chand Chahiye (1993)- Won Sahitya Academy Award
- "Katna Shami Ka Vriksha Padmapankhuri Ki Dhar Se"(2010)

=== Plays ===
- Surya Ki Antim Kiran Se Surya Ki Pahli Kiran Tak (From Sunset to Sunrise, 1972)
- Athwan sarg (Eighth Chapter), 1976,
- Chhote Saiyad bade Saiyad (Junior Saiyad and Senior Saiyad), 1978
- Qaid-e-hayat (Imprisonment of Life), 1983
- "Rati Ka Kangan," 2011

The play Surya ki antim kiran se... was translated as From sunset to sunrise by Jaya Krishnamachari.

- "Dropadi"
- "shakuntala ki anguthi"

English play "Shakespeare In Love With the Mughal Princess Jahan Ara" and its Urdu version "Shakespeare Giraftaar Princess Jahan Ara Ke Pyyaar Mein"

== Kannada translations ==
=== Plays ===
- Suraystadinda Suryodayadavarige by Siddhaling Pattanshetti (1979, 1981, 2017) (Surya Ki Antim Kiran Se Surya Ki Pahli Kiran Tak (From Sunset to Sunrise, 1972))

== Awards and recognition ==
He is also noted as a novelist and won the Sahitya Akademi Award 1996 for his novel Mujhe Chand Chahiye (I want the moon), given by Sahitya Akademi, India's National Academy of Letters. Also the recipient of Sangeet Natak Akademi Award, 1992 for Playwright in Hindi, given by Sangeet Natak Akademi, India's National Academy of Music Dance and Drama.

== Adaptations ==
His historical play, Surya Ki Antim Kiran Se Surya Ki Pahli Kiran Tak, about female sexuality, man-woman relationships, gender equality, has been staged by numerous theatre directors. National School of Drama Repertory Company presented it for the first time in 1974. Amol Palekar who had already directed his stage version in 1972, later was adapted it into Marathi film Anahat (2003).

Chhote Saiyad bade Saiyad (Junior Saiyad and Senior Saiyad) (1978) was directed by B. V. Karanth in 1980, and Qaid-e-hayat (Imprisonment of Life) (1983) was directed by Ram Gopal Bajaj in 1989 at the National School of Drama.
