= Mridula Garg =

Indian writer (born 1938)

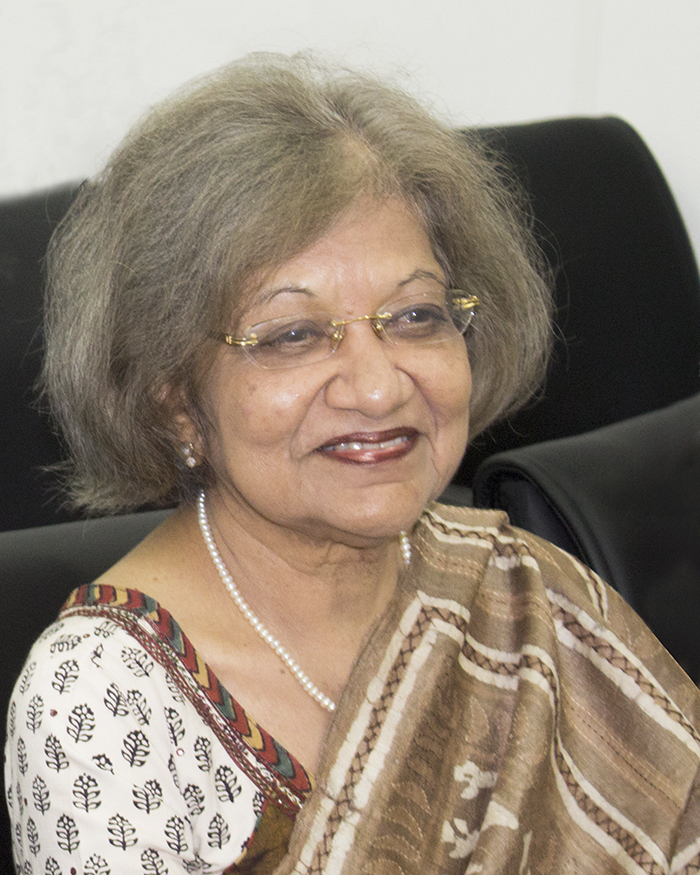
- Born: 1938 (age 87–88); Calcutta, Bengal Presidency, British India
- Writing career
- Language: Hindi, English
- Genres: Short Story, Novel
- Notable work: Miljul Man (2013)
- Notable awards: Sahitya Akademi Award (2013)

Mridula Garg (born 1938) is an Indian writer who writes in Hindi and English. She has published over 30 books in Hindi – novels, short story collections, plays and collections of essays – including several translated into English. She is a recipient of the Sahitya Akademi Award.

== Biography ==
Garg was raised in Delhi by her parents with five sisters and a brother, and began writing stories while she was a child. She completed her masters in economics in 1960 and taught economics in University of Delhi for three years.

She published her debut novel, Uske Hisse Ki Dhoop, in 1975. She was arrested for obscenity after her novel Chittacobra was published in 1979, in a case that extended for two years but did not result in prison. Several of her works have feminist themes, and she told The Hindu in 2010, "My writing is not feminist. One of the metaphors of womanhood is guilt, be it in sexual matters, in working woman or non-working. My women felt no guilt ever. It ruffled feathers. We have the cerebral part and the womb, which encompasses and empowers you but at the same time also tightens you. My kind of feminism is that each woman can be different."

She has been a columnist, writing on environment, women issues, child servitude and literature. She wrote a fortnightly column, Parivar in Ravivar magazine from Kolkata for five years between 1985-1990 and another column Kataksh (Satire) in India Today (Hindi) for 7 years, between 2003 and 2010. Her novels and stories have been translated into a number of Indian and foreign languages like German, Czech, Japanese and English.

She was a research associate at the Center for South Asian Studies in the University of California-Berkeley, USA in April 1990. She has been invited to speak on Hindi literature and criticism, and discrimination against women, at universities and conferences in erstwhile Yugoslavia (1988), the USA (1990 and 1991), and was a delegate to Interlit-3, Germany(1993). She was invited to and Japan (2003), Italy (2011), Denmark and Russia (2012). She traveled widely and lectured and read from her works there.

== Bibliography ==
=== Hindi ===
- Uske Hisse Ki Dhoop (Novel, 1975)
- Kitni Qaiden (Short Stories, 1975)
- Vanshaj (Novel, 1976)
- Tukra-Tukra Aadmi (Short Stories, 1976)
- Daffodil Jal Rahein Hain (Short Stories, 1978)
- Ek Aur Ajnabi (Play, 1978)
- Chittacobra (Novel, 1979)
- Anitya (Novel, 1980)
- Main Aur Main (Novel, 1984)
- Glacier Se (Short Stories, 1980)
- Urf Sam (Short Stories, 1986)
- Shahar Ke Naam (Short Stories, 1990)
- Charchit Kahanaian (Short Stories, 1993)
- Jadoo Ka Kaleen (Play, 1993)
- Teen Qaiden (Plays, 1995)
- Rang-Dhang (Essays, 1995)
- Kath Gulab (Novel, 1996)
- Samagam (Short Stories, 1996)
- Kuchh Atke Kuchh Bhatke (Yatra Samsaran, Essays, 1996)
- Chukte Nahin Sawaal (Essays, 1999)
- Kar Lenge Sab Hazam (Satirical Essays)
- Mere Desh Ki Mitti, Aha (Short Stories, 2001)
- Saam Daam Dand Bhed (Play for children, 2003)
- Sangati-Visangti (in 2 Vol.) (Short Stories, 2004)
- Joote ka Jodh Gobhi ka Todh (Short Stories, 2006)
- Kriti Men Stree patr (critical essays, 2010)
- Miljul Mann (Novel 2010)
- Kriti Aur Kritikar (Essays, 2013)
- Mere Sang ki Aurten (Short story, 2013)
- Vasu ka Kutum (Long story 2016)

=== English ===
- A Touch of Sun (Novel, translated from Hindi, Uske Hisse Ki Dhoop, 1978)
- Daffodils on Fire (Short Stories, 1990)
- Chittacobra (Novel, translated from Hindi, Chittacobra, 1999)
- Country of Goodbyes (Novel, translated from Hindi, Kathgulab, 2003)
- Anitya Halfway to Nowhere (novel, translated from Hindi, Anitya 2010)
- The Last Email (novel originally in English, 2017)

=== Translations ===
- "Kathgulab" translated into Marathi (2008) and Malayalam (2010)
- "Anitya" translated into Marathi from Anitya(Hindi) 2014
- "Main Aur Main" translated into Marathi (2016) from Hindi.
- "Miljul Mann" translated into Urdu (2016), Punjabi (2017), Tamil (2018), Telugu (2018) and Rajasthani (2018) from Hindi language.
- "Chittacobra" translated into Russian (2014). Sovpadeniye Publishing House. Moscow. Translated by Guzel Strelkova and Marina Parusova.

== Awards ==
- Sahityakar Sanman, by the Hindi Academy, Delhi, (1988)
- Sahitya Bhushan, by the U.P. Hindi Sansthan (1999)
- Hellman-Hammet Grant for Courageous Writing by the Human Rights Watch, New York (2001)
- Honored for lifetime contribution to literature in the Vishwa Hindi Sammelan in Suriname in 2003.
- Vyas Samman, for an outstanding work of fiction in Hindi for Kathgulab (2004)
- Uske Hisse ki Dhoop (novel) and Jadoo Ka Kaleen (Play) awarded by the M.P. Sahitya Parishad in 1975 and 1993 respectively.
- Miljul Mann (novel) awarded the Sahitya Akademi Award in 2013
- Mira Smriti Samman award for distinguished contribution to contemporary Hindi literature (2016)
- Ram Manohar Lohia Samman from U.P Hindi Sansthan (2016)
- D. Litt. "Honoris Causa" from ITM University, Gwalior (2016)

== See also ==
- List of Indian writers
