= A. A. Manavalan =

Indian scholar (1937–2018)

A. A. Manavalan (1937–2018) was a Tamil language Indian scholar. He was awarded Saraswati Samman (2011) for his work Irama Kathaiyum Iramayakalyum (2005), which is a comparative study of Ramayana written in 48 languages including Sanskrit, Pali, Prakrit, Tibetan, Tamil, Old Javanese, Japanese, Telugu, Assamese, Malayalam, Bengali, Kannada, Marathi, Hindi, Odisi, Persian, Malay, Burmese, Maranao, Thai, Laotian and Kashmiri. He was the second person from Tamil Nadu to receive this honour, first was Indira Parthasarathy

He earned PhD degree in English literature for his doctoral dissertation Epic Heroism in Milton and Kamban. He translated Poetics of Aristotle into Tamil, a first of its kind in any Indian languages.

Manavalan died on 1 December 2018.

== Works ==
Selected works by A. A. Manavalan:

- Tamil research through journals : an annotated bibliography
- Dr. Mu. Va. : collection of research papers on Dr. Mu. Va.
- Mutual flames : essays in comparative literature, Tamil and English
- Epic heroism in Milton and Kamban
- A compendium of Tirukkural : translations in English
- Essays and tributes on Tirukkural : 1886-1986 A.D.
- Comparative studies in literary cultures
- Aristotilin Kavithai Iyal (Aristotle's poetics in Tamil)
