= Gyan Chaturvedi =

Indian writer and satirist

- Born: 2 August 1952 (age 74); Mauranipur, Jhansi district, Uttar Pradesh, India
- Occupations: Writer, cardiologist
- Spouse: Shashi Chaturvedi
- Children: 2 children
- Awards: Padma Shri; Sharad Joshi Samman; Delhi Academy Award; Indu Sharma Literary Award; Vyas Samman (2022)

Gyan Chaturvedi is an Indian writer and satirist in Hindi language, known for his satirical novels, Baramasi and Narak Yathra. He was honoured by the Government of India in 2015 with Padma Shri, the fourth highest Indian civilian award.

== Biography ==
Chaturvedi was born on 2 August 1952 at Mauranipur, in Jhansi district of the Indian state of Uttar Pradesh. He graduated in medicine from SS Medical College Rewa, did advanced training in cardiology and joined the hospital at Bharat Heavy Electricals Limited (BHEL) where he served for over thirty years till his retirement. He started writing in the 70s with his first published work, Dharmayug. This was followed by several books such as Ham Na Marab, Khamosh Nange Hamam Mein Hain, Marichika, Alag and Pratyansha.

Chaturvedi has been writing regular columns in India Today and Naya Gyanodaya and frequent columns in Rajasthan Patrika. He is a recipient of several awards such as Sharad Joshi Samman of the Government of Madhya Pradesh, Delhi Academy Award and Indu Sharma Literary Award. The Government of India awarded him the civilian honour of Padma Shri in 2015.

Chaturvedi is married to Shashi Chaturvedi, a gynecologist at the All India Institute of Medical Sciences and the couple has a daughter, Neha, a medical doctor, currently an ophthalmologist at AIIMS, New Delhi, and a son, Dushyant, an engineer presently pursuing management studies at the Indian School of Business, the leading school in the country for management and business education.

== Bibliography ==
- Preth Katha (1985)
- Dange Mein Murga (1998)
- Khamosh Nange Hamaam Mein Hain (2004)
- Marichika (2007)
- Baramasi (2009)
- Narak Yathra (2010)
- Alag (2010)
- Pratyansha (2010)
- Ham Na Marab (2014)
- Pagalkhana (2020)
- Swang (2021)
