= K. Siva Reddy =

K.Siva Reddy
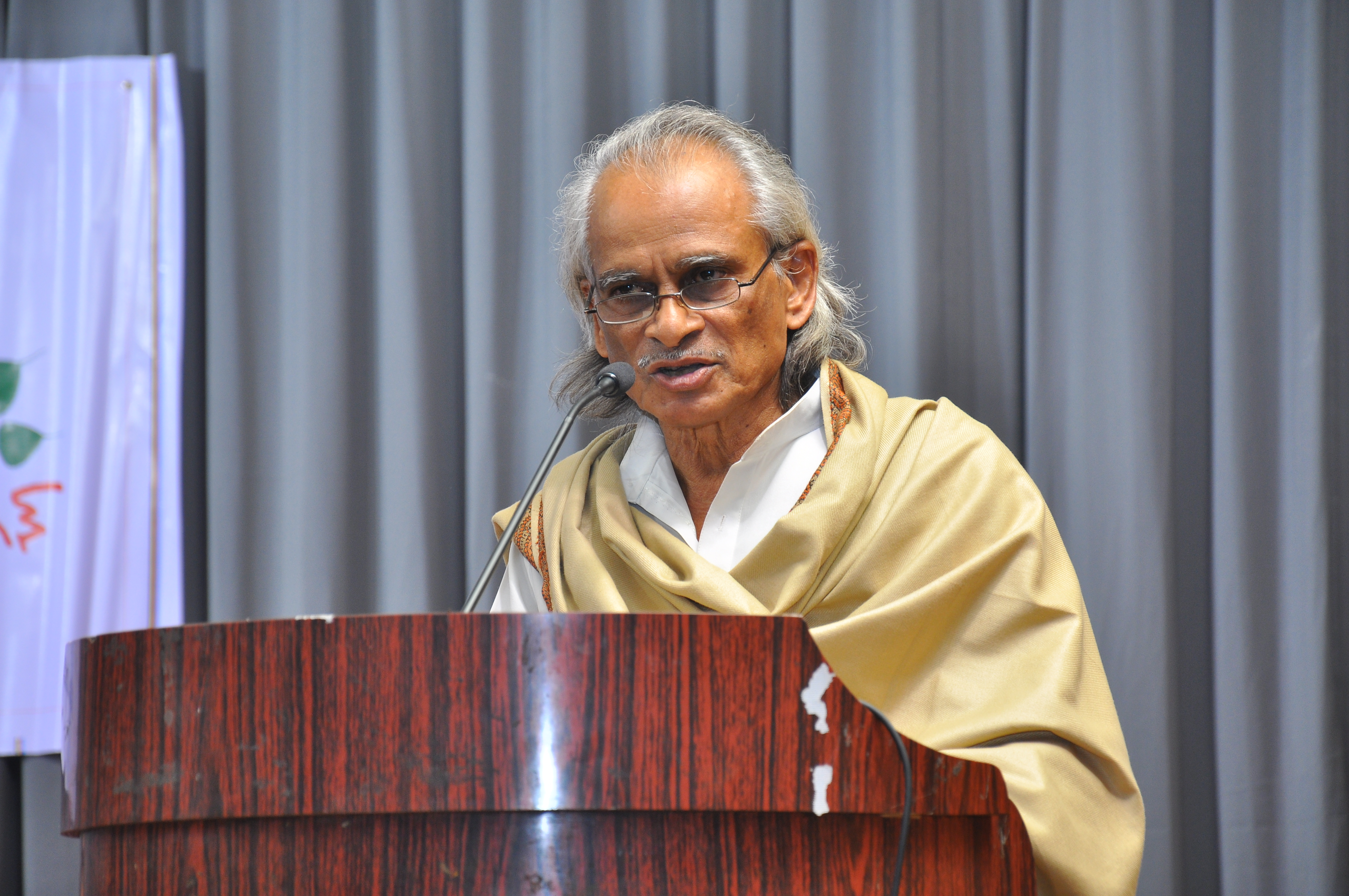
- Siva Reddy in 2012
- Born: 1943 (age 82–83); Guntur, Andhra Pradesh, India
- Citizenship: Indian
- Occupation: poet
- Notable work: Mohana-O-Mohana, Pakkaki Ottigilite
- Awards: Sahitya Akademi Award (1990); Saraswati Samman (2018)

K Siva Reddy is an eminent Telugu poet from India who won the Sahitya Akademi Award in Telugu in 1996 for his Poetry work Mohana-O-Mohana and he was also awarded the Saraswati Samman in 2018 for his poetry collection Pakkaki Ottigilite.

== Career ==
K. Siva Reddy is a retired principal of Vivek Vardhini College in Hyderabad, where he taught English for 35 years there. He has translated African and European poems into Telugu.

== Bibliography ==
=== Poetry ===
- Aame Evaraite Matram, Palapitta Prachuranalu, Hyderabad 2009
- Posaganivannee, Jhari Poetry Circle, Hyderabad, 2008
- Atanu-Charitra, Jhari Poetry Circle, Hyderabad, 2005
- Vrittalekhini, Jhari Poetry Circle, Hyderabad, 2003
- Antarjanam, Jhari Poetry Circle, Hyderabad, 2002
- Kavisamayam, Sahiti Mitrulu, Vijayawada, 2000
- Jaitrayatra, Sivareddy Mithrulu, Hyderabad 1999
- Varsham, Varsham, Jhari Poetry Circle, Hyderabad, 1999 Naa Kalala Nadi Anchuna, Jhari Poetry Circle, Hyderabad, 1997
- Ajeyam, Jhari Poetry Circle, Hyderabad, 1994
- Sivareddy Kavita, Jhari Poetry Circle, Hyderabad, 1991
- Mohana! Oh Mohana!, Jhari Poetry Circle, Hyderabad, 1988
- Bharamiti, Jhari Poetry Circle, Hyderabad, 1983
- Netra Dhanussu, Jhari Poetry Circle, Hyderabad, 1978
- Aasupatrigeetam, Jhari Poetry Circle, Hyderabad, 1976
- Charya, Jhari Poetry Circle, Hyderabad, 1975
- Raktam Suryudu, Jhari Poetry Circle, Hyderabad, 1973

== Awards and honours ==
- Sahitya Akademi Award in Telugu, 1990.
- Saraswati Samman Award, 2018
- Siddartha Kalapeetham Puraskaram
- Dr. Somasunder Sahitya Puraskaram
- Visala Sahiti Award.
