= Narendra Kohli =

Indian author (1940-2021)

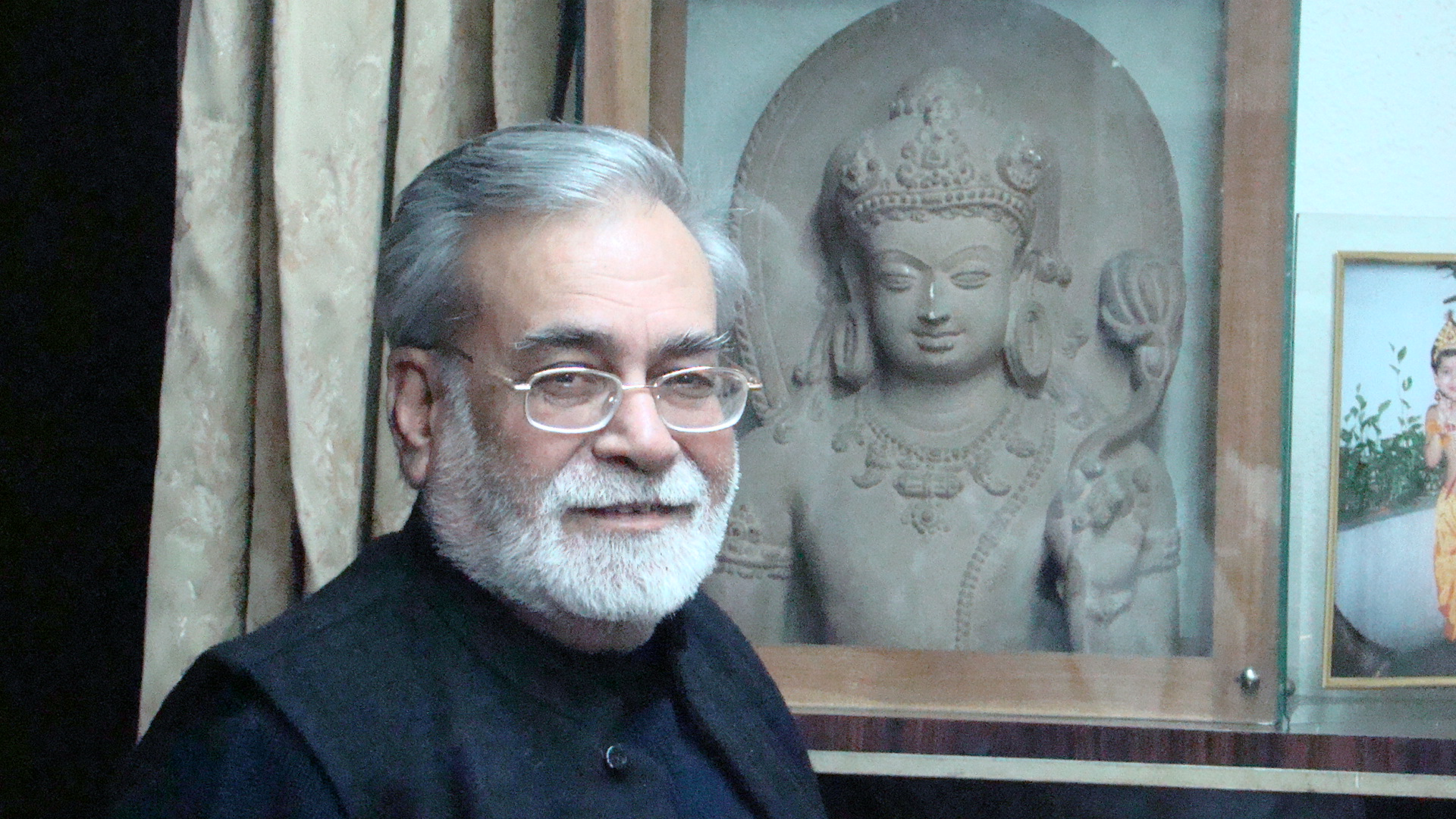
- Born: 6 January 1940; Sialkot, Punjab, British India
- Died: 17 April 2021 (aged 81); Delhi, India
- Education: PhD
- Alma mater: Delhi University
- Occupations: Author and Teacher
- Spouse: Dr. Madhurima Kohli
- Writing career
- Notable works: Abhyudaya (Ram Katha); Mahasamar (Mahabharat); Toro Kara Toro (Vivekananda)
- Notable awards: Vyas Samman (2012); Padma Shri (2017)
- Website: www.narendrakohli.in

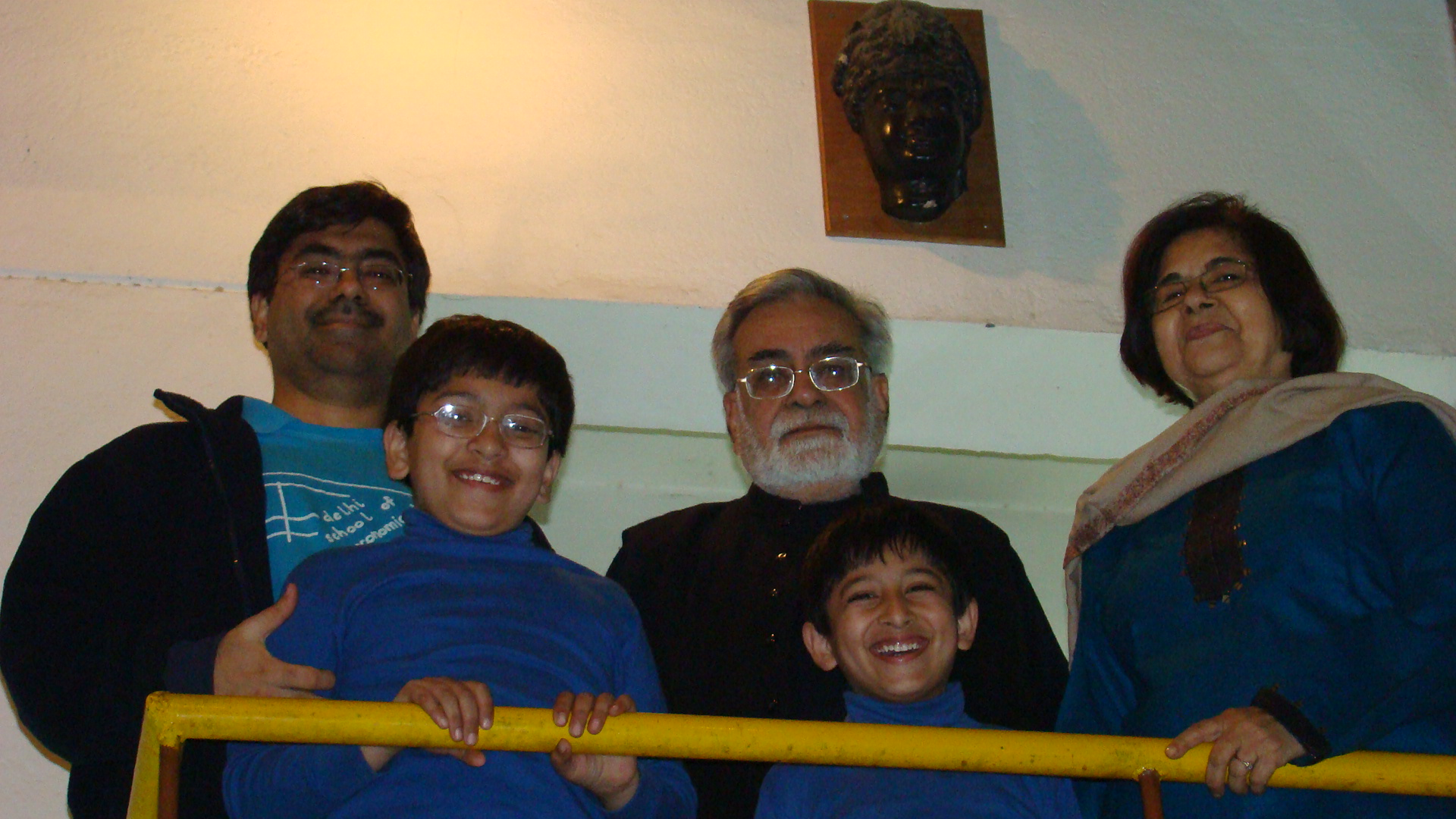
Dr. Narendra Kohli with wife Dr. Madhurima Kohli, his elder son Kartikeya, and grandsons, New Delhi (2008)

Narendra Kohli (6 January 1940 – 17 April 2021) was an Indian author. Writing in Hindi-language, he is credited with reinventing the ancient form of epic writing in modern prose. He is also regarded as a trendsetter in the sense that he pioneered the creation of literary works based on the Puranas. Because of the large impact of his body of work on Hindi literature, not only is this era of contemporary modern Hindi literature, since about 1975, sometimes referred to as the Kohli Era, his birth anniversary of January 6th is celebrated as Litterateurs' Day or Writers' Day in the Hindi literature world. He died on 17 April due to complications of COVID-19 after he was on a ventilator.

== Life ==
Narendra Kohli was born to Parmananda Kohli and Vidyavanti, a Punjabi Hindu couple in Punjab province of British India. His first school was the Dev Samaj High School in Lahore. Then he attended the Ganda Singh High School in Sialkot for a few months. In 1947, after the partition of India, the family moved to Jamshedpur (Bihar). He resumed his schooling in third grade at Dhatkidih Lower Primary school. He spent fourth to seventh grade (1949–53) at New Middle English school. Urdu was the medium of instruction for all subjects except English, which was limited to reading and writing. From eighth to eleventh grade, he attended KMPM High School in Jamshedpur. He selected the science stream in high school. The medium of instruction was Urdu till this point.

For higher education, he joined the Jamshedpur Co-operative College. He took the IA exams in 1959 from Bihar University with Compulsory English, Compulsory Hindi, Psychology, Logic, and special Hindi as his subjects. He completed his BA (Hons.) in 1961 from Jamshedpur Co-operative College (Ranchi University) in Hindi. He completed his MA in 1963 at Ramjas College (University of Delhi), and in 1970, received his PhD from the University of Delhi.

He died on 17 April 2021, aged 81 of COVID-19.

== Early writings ==
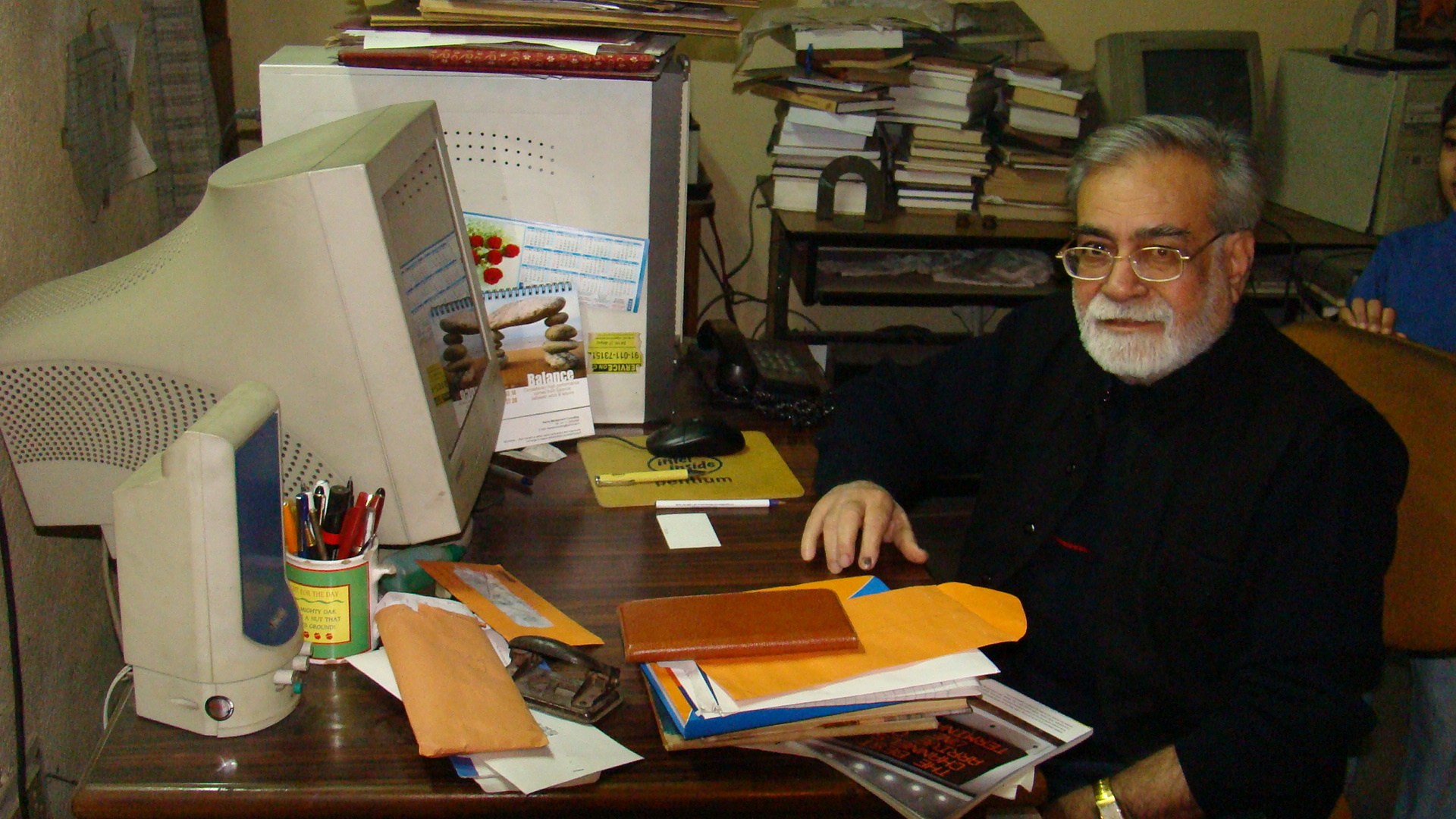
Kohli at his writing table, New Delhi (2008)

His first story was in sixth grade for the handwritten class magazine. In eighth grade, his Urdu story Hindostan: Jannat Nishan was published in the school's printed magazine. As a child author, some of his first Hindi stories were published by Kishore (Patna) and Avaaz (Dhanbad). During his IA years, Sarita (Delhi) published his story Paani ka Jug, Gilas aur Ketli in its Nae Ankur ("New Sprouts") column.

After February 1960 his works started getting published regularly. He considered Do Haath published by Kahani (Allahabad) as his first published work.

He wrote a few novels based on the life of families and societies as well. But just portraying the society, or ridiculing its flaws and dilemmas was not going to satisfy him. He realised, that literature cannot reach its ultimate goal just by a narrow, partial and limited display of society, nor can the society benefit from such literature. The demonstration of poor human qualities will only encourage the evil and the foul. Therefore, it must be the goal of literature to demonstrate the great, honourable and moral aspect of life, he believed.

== Bibliography ==
Todo, Kara Todo is a novel based on the life of Swami Vivekananda. One reviewer called it the best on this topic in any of the languages so far.

Vasudeva is a novel describing the life and times of Vasudeva, the father of Krishna; it describes his virtues and draws parallels between that era and the present day. It has been described by critics as a manifesto of a cultural revolution and an epic of human endurance and endeavour.

=== Work ===
- Ek aur lal tikon – 1970
- Paanch absurd upanyas – 1972
- Aashriton ka vidroh – 1973
- Jagane ka apradh – 1973
- Pareshaniyan – 1986
- Gantantra ka ganit – 1997
- Aadhunik ladki ki peeda – 1978
- Trasidiyan – 1982
- Mere mohalle ke phool – 2000
- Samagra vyang – 2002
- Sabse bada satya – 2003
- Woh kahan hai – 2003
- Aatma ki pavitrata – 1996
- Meri shreshth vyang rachnayen – 1977
- Samagra natak – 1990
- Samagra vyang (part 1, 2, 3) – 1998
- Samagra kahaniyan (Part 1, 2) – 1991, 1992
- Abhyuday (2 parts) – 1989
- Narendra kohli: Chuni hui rachnayen – 1990
- Narendra kohli ne kaha – 1997
- Meri ekyavan vyang rachnayen – 1997
- Meri terah kahaniyan – 1998
- Na bhuto na bhavishyati – 2004
- Swami vivekanand – 2004
- Das pratinidhi kahaniyan – 2006
- Premchand ke sahitya sidhhant – 1966
- Premchand (aalochana) – 1976
- Parineeti – 1969
- Kahani ka aabhav – 1977
- Drishti desh me ekaek – 1979
- Shatal – 1982
- Namak ka kaidi – 1983
- Nichale flat me – 1984
- Sanchit bhookh – 1985
- Punarambh – 1972
- Aatank – 1972
- Saha gaya dukh – 1974
- Mera apna sansar – 1975
- Deeksha – 1975
- Awsar – 1976
- Jangal ki kahani – 1977
- Sangharsh ki oor – 1978
- Yuddh (2 parts) – 1979
- Abhigyan – 1981
- Aatmadan – 1983
- Preetikatha – 1986
- Mahasamr 1 (Bandhan) – 1988
- Mahasamr 2 (Adhikar) – 1990
- Mahasamr 3 (Karm) – 1991
- Todo kara todo 1 (Nirman) – 1992
- Mahasamr 4 (Dharm) – 1993
- Todo kara todo 2 (Sadhana) – 1993
- Mahasamr 5 (Antaral) – 1995
- Kshama karna jiji – 1995
- Mahasamr 6 (prachhanna) – 1997
- Mahasamr 7 (Pratyaksh) – 1998
- Mahasamr 8 (Nirbandh) – 2000
- Todo kara todo 3 (Parivrajak) – 2003
- Todo kara todo 4 (Nirdesh) – 2004
- Ganit ka prashna – 1978
- Aasan rasta – 1985
- Ek din mathura me – 1991
- Abhi tum bachche ho – 1995
- Kukur – 1997
- Samadhan – 1997
- Shambook ki hatya – 1975
- Nirnay ruka hua – 1985
- Hatyare – 1985
- Gare ki deewar – 1986
- Kishkindha – 1998
- Agastya katha – 1998
- Hatyare – 1999
- Kise Jagau – 1996
- Pratinaad – 1996
- Nepathya – 1983
- Majra kya hai – 1989
- Baba nagarjun – 1987
- Smarami – 2000
- matsyagandha
