= Ramdarash Mishra =

Indian Hindi-language poet, writer and academic (1924–2025)

- Born: 15 August 1924; Dumri, Gorakhpur district, United Provinces of Agra and Oudh, British India (now Uttar Pradesh, India)
- Died: 31 October 2025 (aged 101); Delhi, India
- Education: Banaras Hindu University
- Occupations: Poet, writer, academic
- Writing career
- Language: Hindi
- Genres: Poetry, short stories, novels, literary criticism
- Notable awards: Padma Shri (2025); Saraswati Samman (2021); Sahitya Akademi Award (2015); Vyas Samman (2011)

Ramdarash Mishra (15 August 1924 – 31 October 2025) was an Indian poet, writer and academic known for his contributions to modern Hindi literature. His literary career spanned over seven decades, encompassing poetry, fiction, criticism and essays. As of 2024, he had authored over 150 books, including 32 poetry collections, 30 short-story collections, 15 novels, and multiple volumes of literary criticism and memoirs.

== Life and career ==
Mishra was born in Dumri village of Gorakhpur district in present-day Uttar Pradesh. He completed his higher education at Banaras Hindu University, later serving as a professor in the Hindi department at the University of Delhi. His literary work was marked by a deep connection with rural life, philosophical reflection and humanist themes.

His notable poetry collections included Banaya Hai Maine Ye Ghar Dhire Dhire and Main Toh Yahan Hoon, for which he received the Saraswati Samman. His short stories and novels often explore social change, village life, and existential questions. Critics regard him as one of the most enduring voices of post-independence Hindi literature.

Even past the age of 100, Mishra remained active in writing and public life. He was featured in several national media profiles as one of India's most prolific and resilient writers. Literary critics and scholars have widely acknowledged his unique role in shaping modern Hindi literature.

Mishra died in Delhi on 31 October 2025, at the age of 101.

== Awards and honours ==
- In 2025, Mishra was conferred the Padma Shri, India's fourth-highest civilian award, in the field of literature and education.
- He received the Saraswati Samman in 2021 for his poetry collection Main Toh Yahan Hoon.
- In 2015, he was awarded the Sahitya Akademi Award for his poetry collection Agni Ki Hansi.
- 2011: He received the Vyas Samman for lifetime contribution to Hindi poetry.

== See also ==
- Hindi literature
- List of Sahitya Akademi Award winners for Hindi
