= Govind Mishra =

Indian novelist (born 1939)

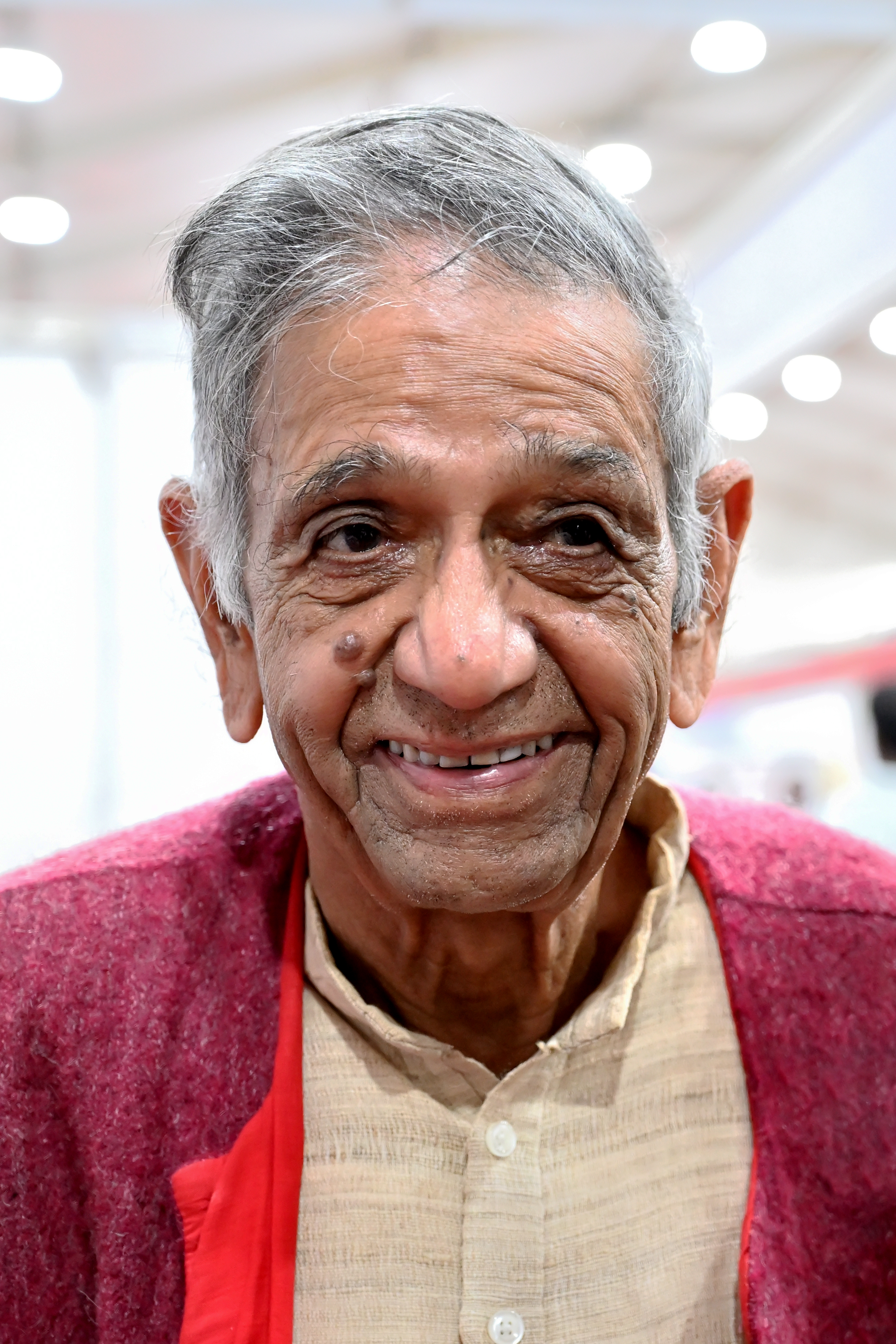
- Born: 1 August 1939 (age 87); Atarra, Banda, United Provinces, India
- Education: Allahabad University
- Occupation: Writer
- Notable work: Lal Peeli Zameen (1976); Dhool Paudho Par (2008)
- Awards: Vyas Samman (1998); Sahitya Akademi Award (2008); Saraswati Samman (2013)

Govind Mishra (born 1 August 1939) is an Indian novelist, who has written more than 53 books. He was also a civil servant with Indian Revenue Service (IRS) and retired as Chairperson, Central Board of Direct Taxes in 1997. Over the years, he has written 11 novels, 14 short story collections, five travelogues, five literary essays collection, a poem collection and 2 story books for children.

He has been awarded the most prestigious Hindi awards namely Vyas Samman (1998) and Sahitya Akademi Award (2008). He received Saraswati Samman for the year 2013 for his book Dhool Paudho Par published in 2008. This honour made him the second Hindi author to receive the honour after Harivansh Rai Bachchan in 1991.

== Biography ==
He was born on 1 August 1939 in Atarra, Banda, United Provinces (now Uttar Pradesh). His parents were primary school teachers. His early education was completed in Banda, Uttar Pradesh, thereafter he did his BA and MA (English) from Allahabad University which in those days was known to be the "Oxford of the East". He taught for two years, graduate classes and in 1962 joined the Indian Revenue Service from which he retired in 1997 as Chairman, Central Board of Direct Taxes. Thereafter he shifted to Bhopal.

Vyas Samman was awarded in 1998, to his work "Paanch Anangano Wala Ghar" which was later translated into various Indian languages and also in English as "House with Five Courtyards", published by Penguin.

Sahitya Akademi Award, given by Sahitya Akademi, India's National Academy of Letters, was awarded in 2008 on "Kohre Mein Kaid Rang" which is also being translated in various regional languages and English by Sahitya Akademi, Ravindra Bhavan, New Delhi. His main publishers are Rajkamal Prakashan, Vani Prakashan and Kitab Ghar in Delhi. A book comprising criticism of his works entitled "Govind Mishra: Shrajan ke Aayam" edited by Dr. Chandrakant Vandivadekar has been published by Vani Prakashan. Another book of criticism on his works entitled "Govind Mishra ka Rachna Lok" is being edited by Dr. Krishnadutt Paliwal and is due to be published by Kitab Ghar. A biography on him entitled "Biyanba Mein Bahar" written by Dr. Urmila Sirish is due for publication from Kitab Ghar Prakashan Delhi.

Govind Mishra was also awarded the Bharat Bharti Samman for the year 2011 - the highest literary award given by the Uttar Pradesh government.
