= Indu Sharma Katha Samman =

Literary award

Indu Sharma International Katha Samman is a literary award given by the Indu Sharma Memorial Trust. Chitra Mudgal received the first Katha Samman. The award was instituted in memory of poet and short story writer Indu Sharma. She died of cancer in 1995.

== Awardees ==
Year	Recipient	Work	Ref.
2000	Chitra Mudgal	Novel Aawaan	
2001	Sanjiv	Jungle Jahan Shuru Hota hai	
2002	Gyan Chaturvedi		
2003	S.R. Harnot	Darosh aur Anya Kahanian	
2004	Vibhuti Narain Rai	Tabaadala	
2005	Pramod Kumar Tiwari	Darr Hamari Jebon Mein	
2006	Asghar Wajahat	Kaisee Aaagi Lagaai	
2007	Mahua Maji	Main Borishailla	
2008	Nasera Sharma	Kuiyaanjaan	
2009	Bhagwan Das Morwal	Ret	
2010	Hrishikesh Sulabh	Vasant ke Hatyare	
2011	Vikas Kumar Jha	McCluskieganj	
2012	Pradeep Saurabh	Teesri Tali	
2013	Pankaj Subir	Mahua Ghatvarin	
2014	Sundar Chandra Thakur	Patthar Par Doob	
2015	Alka Sarawagi	Jankidas Tejpal Manson	
2016	Vivek Mishra	Dominik Ki Wapasi	
2017	Gyanprakash Vivek	Dari Hui Ladki	
2018	Sudhakar Adeeb	Katha Virat	
2019	Manish Kulshreshtha	Mallika	
