= Ramkumar Mukhopadhyay =

Bengali writer from India (born 1956)

- Ramkumar Mukhopadhyay in 2015
- Born: 8 March 1956 (age 70); Calcutta, West Bengal, India
- Education: M A (University of Calcutta); Ph.D. (Jadavpur University)
- Occupations: short story writer, novelist
- Writing career
- Notable awards: Ananda Puraskar (2013); Saraswati Samman (2025)

Ramkumar Mukhopadhyay (born 8 March 1956) is an Indian Bengali-language novelist, short-story writer, essayist and editor. He also remained Director Publishing Department at Visva-Bharati University (2012 - 2017). His literary works include Dhanapatir Singhalyatra, which received the Ananda Puraskar in 2013, and Hara Parbati Katha (2020), which was selected for the Saraswati Samman for 2025. He has written novels and short stories for both adults and children.

== Early life and education ==
Ramkumar Mukhopadhyay was born in Calcutta. His father was Ramangamohan Mukhopadhyay and mother Kanaklata Mukhopadhyay. At the age of one and a half, his family moved to Gelia, a village in the Joypur area of Bankura district, where he grew up and received his primary education at Deshbandhu Primary School in the village, and secondary education at Rajgram S. B. Raha Institution, in near by Rajgram. He subsequently graduated from Ramakrishna Mission Vidyamandir, a residential college at Belur, before taking a Master's in English from the University of Calcutta. He completed his academic studies at Jadavpur University, where he received a Ph.D. in 1992.

== Career ==
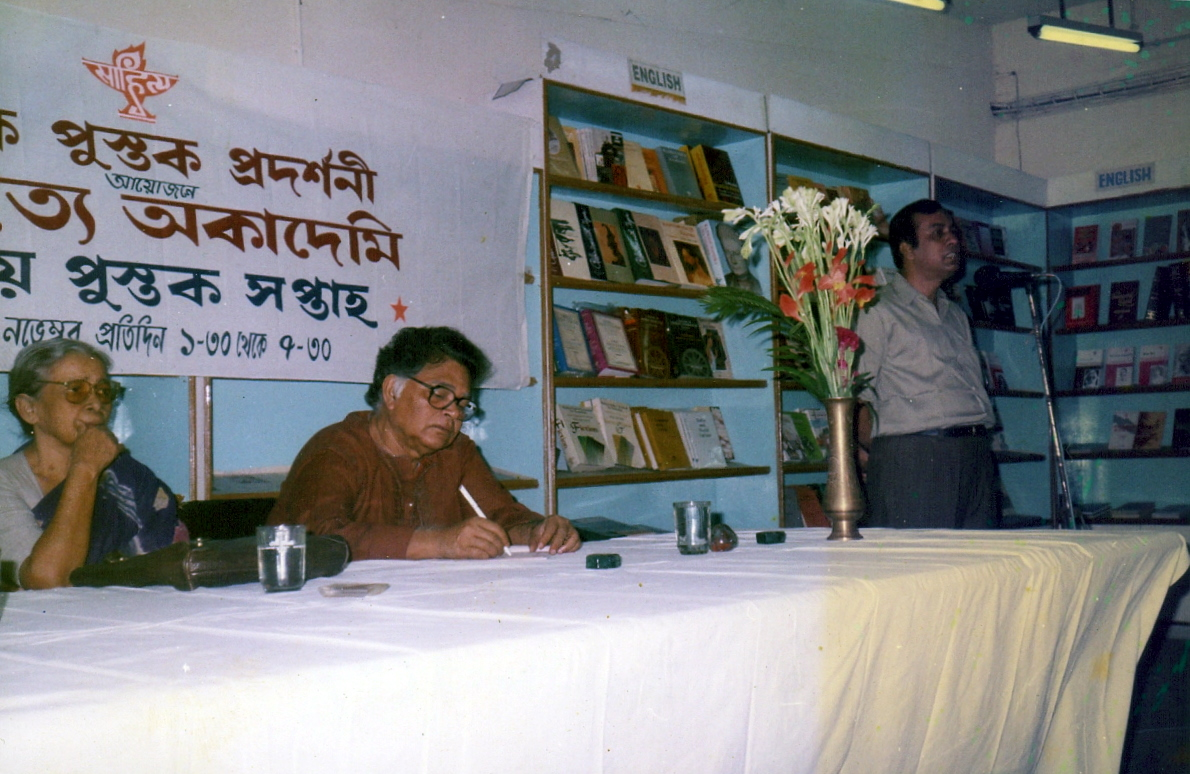
At a Sahitya Akademi Book-release programme 2001-2002, with Mahashweta Devi and Sunil Gangopadhyay.

Mukhopadhyay started his literary career as a short-story writer; his first collection, Madale Natun Bol, containing fourteen stories, was published in the 1980s, while his first novel, Charane Prantare was published in 1993. Besides that he started his career as regional secretary, East India, of Sahitya Akademi. Formerly he was convener of the Bengali Advisory Board of the Sahitya Akademi. He was also president of the Kolkata-based Bharatiya Bhasha Parishad. He has retired as the director of the Publishing Department, Visva-Bharati University. He is associated with a number of Bengali Little magazines.

Over his career spanning five decades, he has published nine novels, eleven short-story collections, four essay collections and two travelogues. His literary and editorial work also included a compilation of 128 folktales drawn from 54 languages.

Mukhopadhyay's novel Dhanapatir Singhalyatra, received the Ananda Puraskar in 2013. His novel Hara Parbati Katha (2020), drawing upon the mythology of Shiva and Parvati, was selected for the Saraswati Samman for 2025. His other awards include, the Bankim Puraskar, Somen Chanda Smriti Award and Bangla Akademi Award.

== Works ==
His first collection of 14 short stories entitled "Madale Natun Bol" (The New Beats on the Drum) published from Calcutta in 1984. His first novel "Charane Prantare" (At the Grazing Ground, at the Horizon) was published from Calcutta in 1993.

=== Novel ===
- Charane Prantare (At the Grazing Ground, at the Horizon)
- Bhanga Nider Dana (The Wings of the Broken Nest)
- Michhiler Pare (After the Mass Gathering)
- Dukhe Keora (Dukhe Keora)
- Bhabadiya Nangarchandra (Yours Sincerely, Nangarchandra)
- Kathar Katha (Stories about Stories)
- Dhanapatir Sinhala Jatra (Dhanapati's Journey to Sri Lanka)
- Hara - Parvati Katha (The story of Hara & Parvati )
- Job - Mukhujye Bakyalap (2023)

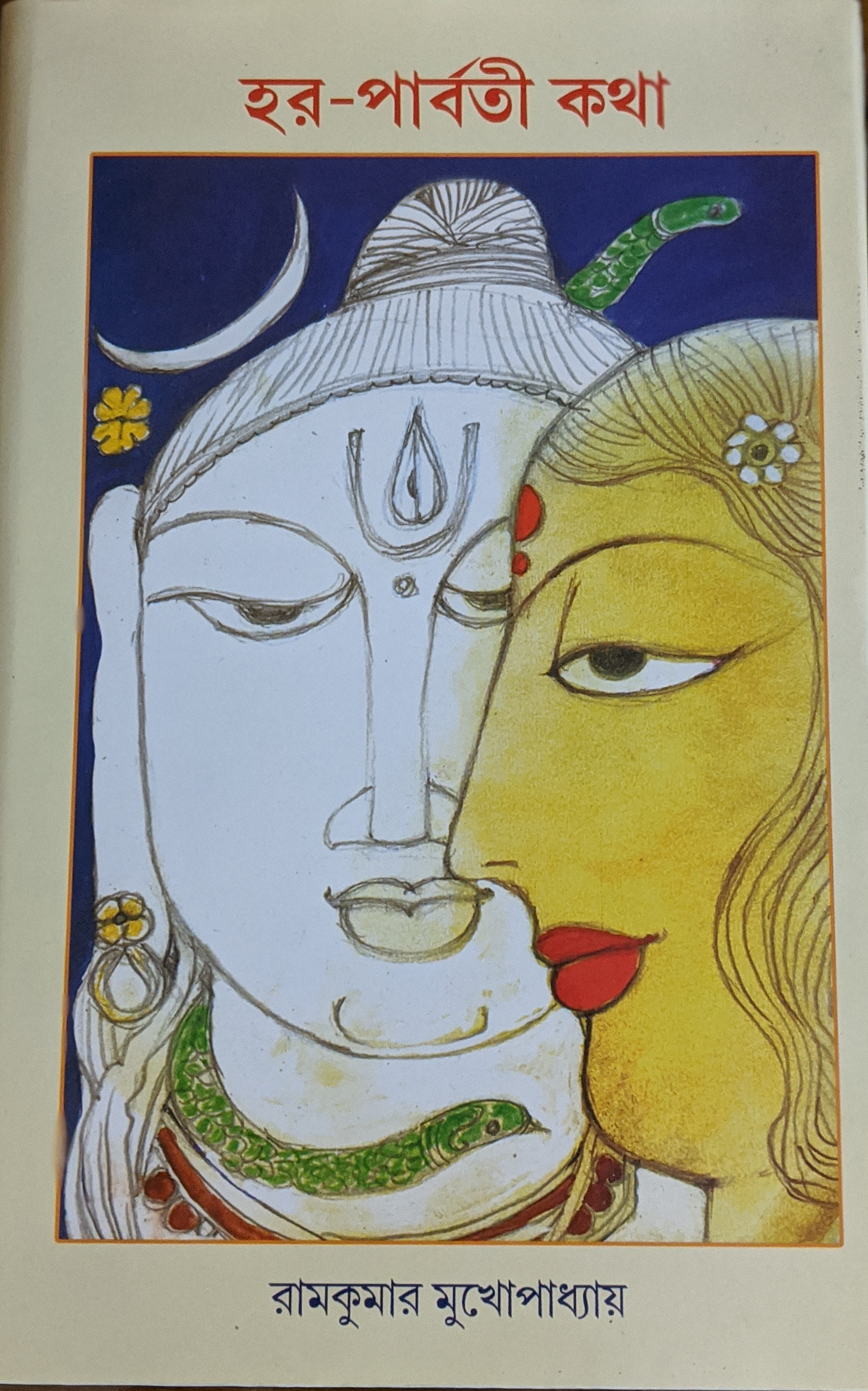
A novel on Hara and Parvati, 2020 Mitra and Ghosh Pvt. Ltd.

=== Short story collection ===
- Madale Natun Bol (The New Beats on the Drum)
- Ramkumar Mukhopadhyay-er Chhotagalpa (Short Stories of Ramkumar Mukhopadhyay)
- Parikrama (Wide Travelling)
- Sankha (A Conch-bangle)
- Jyastha 1390, Ghughu Kimba Manus (Jaistha 1390, Dove or a Man by Lifi Publications)
- Srestha Galpa (Best Stories)
- Priyankar Chhelei (A Boy-child It Will Be)
- Dasti Galpa (Ten Stories)
- Jatra (The Journey)
- Galpasamagra (The Complete Short Stories)
- Banglar M.A. (2023)

=== Travelogue ===
- Natun Chine (In the New China)
- Oi Banglay (In the Other Bengal)

=== Book of essays ===
- Satabdi Sesher Galpa (An End-Century Assessment of Bengali Short Stories)
- Bangali Sanskritir Ayatan (The Area of Bengali Culture)
- Adhunik Bharatiya Kathasahitya (Modern Indian Fiction)

=== Compiled and edited ===
- Sera Nabinder Sera Galpa (The Best Stories of the Young Writers)
- Parabarti Sabdabali:Dui Banglar Tarunder Kavita (The Next Diction : The Poems of the Young Poets of Both Bengals)
- Aro Nabin Aro Sera Galpa (Short Stories of the Younger Writers)
- Bharat Joda Galpakatha (Indian Short Stories)
- Katha Jatra (A Journey through Bengali Short Stories, a collection)
- Bharatjora Kathankatha (The oral Tales of India)

=== Juvenile literature ===
- Katum-Katum(Remodelling Natural Objects)/Jointly edited
- Sat Sagarer Pare (Beyond The Seven Seas)/Jointly edited

== Awards ==
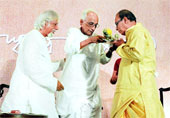
Ananda Purashkar 2013

- Somenchandra Award of Paschimbanga Bangla Akademi (2000)
- Galpamela Puraskar (2004)
- Katha Award (New Delhi, 2005)
- [Bankimchandra Smriti Puraskar of the Department of Higher Education, Govt. of West Bengal (2006)
- Saratchandra Smriti Puraskar (Bhagalpur, 2007)
- Sis Puraskar (2008)
- Gajendra Kumar Mitra Birth Centenary Award 2009
- Ananda Puraskar of the Ananda Bazar Patrika and Desh (2013)
- D.L.Ray Award (2014)
- Kusumanjali Award (New Delhi, 2014)
- Krititwa Samagra Puraskar of Bharatiya Bhasha Parisad (2016)
- Karmayogi Nanigopal Chakraborty Smriti Sahitya Puraskar (2023)
- Saraswati Samman (2025)
