= Vibhuti Narain Rai =

Indian police official and author (born 1950)

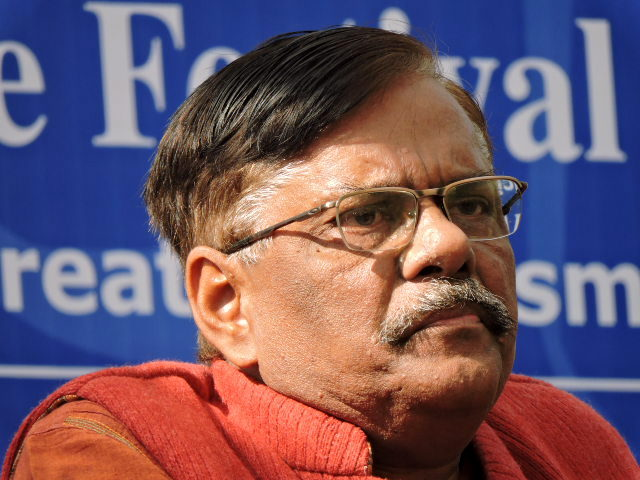
- Rai at Chandigarh Literature Festival 2016
- Born: 28 November 1950 (age 75); Azamgarh, Uttar Pradesh
- Education: M.A. (English Litt.)
- Occupations: Writer, novelist, activist, translator, Director general of police (Retired), former Vice Chancellor Mahatma Gandhi Antarrashtriya Hindi Vishwavidyalaya,
- Writing career
- Notable works: Ghar, Shahar Mein Curfew, Kissa Loktantra, Tabadala and Prem Ki Bhoot Katha.
- Notable awards: Indu Sharma Antarrastriya Katha Samman
- Website: vibhutinarain.blogspot

Vibhuti Narain Rai (born 28 November 1950) is an ex police officer and author from India. He obtained an M.A. in English literature from Allahabad University in 1971, and joined the Indian Police Service in 1975 as a part of the Uttar Pradesh cadre. He served many sensitive districts as a superintendent of police.

Between 1992–2001, Rai was deputed to the Government of India, during which time his postings included anti-insurgency operations in the Kashmir Valley (1993–94). Rai retired as Director General of Police in Uttar Pradesh. He has been awarded President's Police Medal for Distinguished Services and Police Medal for Meritorious Services. He was appointed as Vice Chancellor of a central university- Mahatma Gandhi Antarrashtriya Hindi Vishwavidyalaya, Wardha for five years in 2008.

Rai has published six novels- Ghar, Shahar mein Curfew, Kissa Loktantra, Tabadala, Prem Ki Bhoot Katha and Ramgarh Mein Hatya. These novels have been translated in almost all the Indian Languages and English. His other books are Ranbhumi Mein Bhasha, Kise Chahiye Sabhya Police, Fence Ke Us Par, Andhi Surang Mein Kashmir, Pakistan Mein Bhagat Singh, Sampradayik Dange Aur Bhartiya Police, Hashimpura 22 May, Combating Communal Conflicts and also a collection of satire Ek Chhatra Neta Ka Rojnamcha.

== Shahar Mein curfew ==
In 1988, Rai published a Hindi novel entitled Shahar Mein Curfew (Curfew in the City). Its theme was a 1980 Hindu-Muslim riot in the city of Allahabad, and Rai wrote freely about how religious prejudice in the Hindu dominated police force and provincial administration led to Muslim citizens' being viewed as enemies and thus becoming easy targets of brutality and murder. The Vishva Hindu Parishad (VHP) took offence and denounced the novel for being anti-Hindu. It now wants a ban imposed on the novel, and when Ashok Singhal, secretary general of the VHP, was told of a producer wanting to turn the story into a film, he threatened to burn down theatres that dared to screen the planned film.

All this ire surrounds a project that has still not begun and a work of fiction that at no point directly criticizes any Hindu organization. It is worthwhile to quote here from a recent interview given by the author: "The intolerance of dissent is increasing in our society and the Ayodhya mobilization has largely contributed to this disturbing trend. The attacks on inconvenient writers and dissenting journalists are in fact motivated by a desire to silence all criticism and all reason, thereby making the very existence of rationally-thinking people redundant to the social and political process. This is extremely distressing."

== Works in Hindi ==
=== Novels ===
- Ghar
- Shahar Mein Curfew
- Kissa Loktantra
- Tabadla
- Prem Ki Bhoot Katha
- Hashimpura 22 May

=== Satire ===
- Ek Chhatra Neta Ka Rojnamcha

=== Criticism ===
- Katha Sahitya Ke Sau Baras
- "Ranbhumi mein bhasha"

== Works in English ==
- Combating Communal Conflict
- Communal Conflicts: Perception of Police Neutrality During Hindu-Muslim Riots in India, Renaissance Pub. House (1998)

== Translations into English ==
- Curfew in the City, translated by C. M. Naim, New Delhi: Roli Books, 1998.
- Tabadala, translated by Zeba Alvi to Urdu in Karachi (Pakistan) 2009.
