= Vishwanath Tripathi =

Hindi-language writer (born 1931)

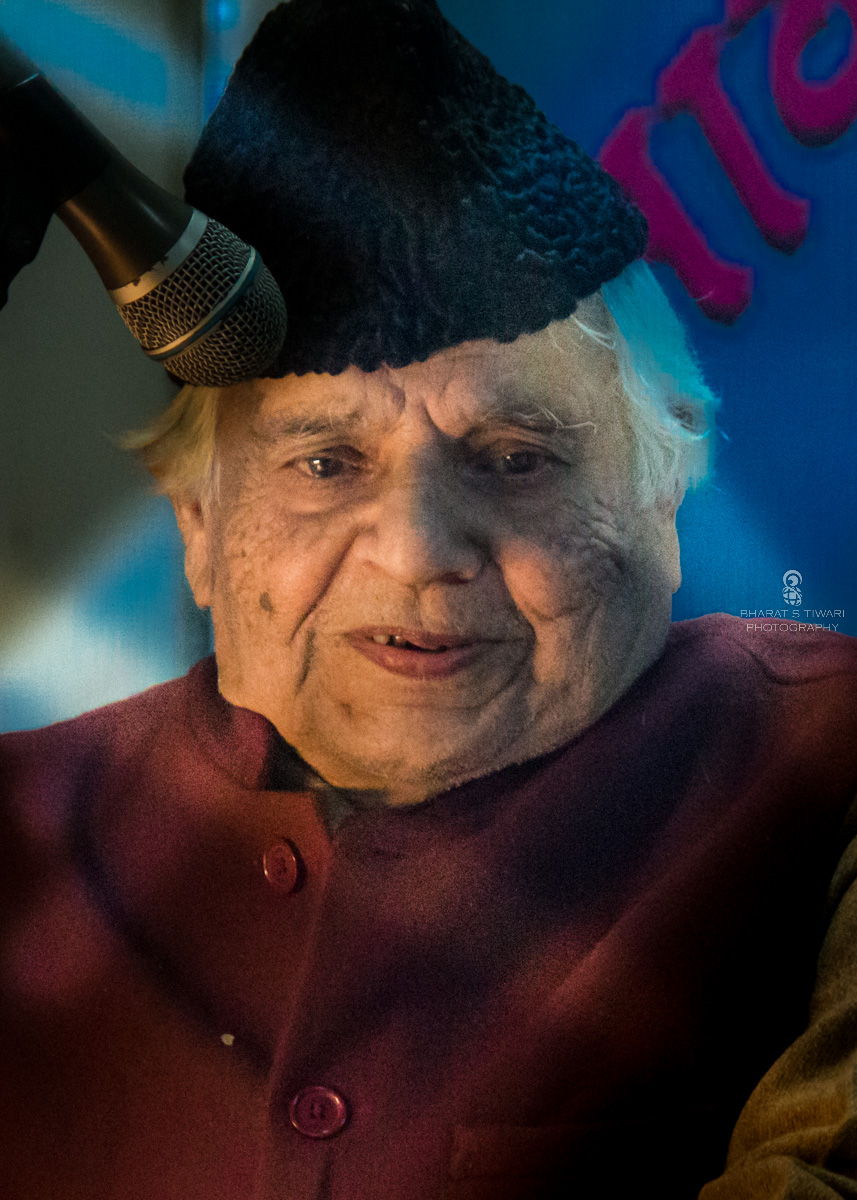
- Vishwanath Tripathi
- Born: 16 February 1931 (age 95); Bishkohar, siddharthnagar district, Uttar Pradesh, India
- Education: Banaras Hindu University, Panjab University
- Occupations: Writer, Author
- Writing career
- Notable work: Vyomkesh Darvesh
- Notable awards: Moortidevi Award, 2014; Vyas Samman, 2013; Namvar samman, 2019

Vishwanath Tripathi (born 16 February 1931) is a Hindi writer. He has around 20 publications to his credit which include literary criticism, memoirs and poetry collection.

== Works ==
1. Hindi Aalochana
2. Lokwadi Tulsidas
3. Meera Ka Kavya
4. Desh ke is Daur Main (criticism on essays of Harishankar parsai)
5. Kuch Kahaniyan Kuch Vichar (short story criticism)
6. Ped Ka Hath (criticism on poetry of Kedarnath Agarwal)
7. Jaisa Kah Saka (poetry selection; revised edition – 'Premchand biskohar me')
8. Nangatalai Ka Gaon. (autobiographical memoirs)
9. Ganga snan karne chaloge
10. Vyomakesh darvesh (Biography and criticism of Hazari Prasad Dwivedi)
11. Guruji ki kheti-bari
12. Apana des-pardes
13. Kahani ke sath-sath (short story criticism)
14. Upanyas ka ant nahi hua hai
15. Aalochak ka samajik dayitwa

== Awards ==
- Moortidevi Award, 2014
