= Nasira Sharma =

Indian writer (born 1948)

Nasera Sharma
- Born: 1948 (age 77–78); Allahabad, India
- Education: University of Allahabad (B.A.); Jawaharlal Nehru University (M.A. in Persian Language and Literature)
- Writing career
- Language: Hindi, English, Persian
- Years active: 1976-present
- Genres: Hindi literature, literary fiction
- Notable awards: Sahitya Akademi Award; 2015

Nasira Sharma or Nasera Sharma (born 1948) is an Indian writer who writes in Hindi.

== Biography ==
She was born in Allahabad, Uttar Pradesh, India. She has published 10 Hindi-language novels. She was the only woman from South Asia to interview Ruhollah Khomeini after he came into power.

== Awards ==
- Sahitya Akademi Award for her novel Paarijat.
- Vyas Samman for her novel Kagaz ki Naav in 2019.

== Selected works ==
- Paarijat
- Mere Priya Kahaniyaan
- Ajnabi Jajira
- Patthar Gali
- Aurat Ke Liye Aurat

Her short story 'Hunger', was featured in the CISCE English Literature syllabus for class 9 & 10. The story is set during the shift of power in Iran, from Monarchy to the Islamic Revolution. It is based a man named Rizwan, who is struggling to get by. He finally lands a job in a Newspaper agency, with his 1st task being interviewing people on the streets of Iran - showcasing the social realities of the time beyond kings and conquerors.
