= Kalidasa Akademi =

Kalidasa Academy is a cultural institution established by the Government of Madhya Pradesh to act as a multi-disciplinary institution, which would project the totality of classical tradition with Kalidasa as its centre. It was set up in 1978 and is located in Ujjain.
