= Saraswati Samman =

Indian literary award

- Sponsored by: K. K. Birla Foundation
- Date: 1991; 35 years ago
- Location: Delhi
- Country: India
- Reward: ₹15,00,000
- Most recent winner: Ramkumar Mukhopadhyay

Highlights
- Total awarded: 35
- First winner: Harivansh Rai Bachchan

The Saraswati Samman is an annual award for outstanding prose or poetry literary works in any of the 23 languages of India listed in Schedule VIII of the Constitution of India. It is named after the Hindu goddess of knowledge, Saraswati.

== History and selection process ==
The Saraswati Samman was instituted in 1991 by the K. K. Birla Foundation. It consists of ₹15,00,000, a citation and a plaque. Candidates are selected from literary works published in the previous ten years by a panel that included scholars and former award winners. The inaugural award was given to Harivansh Rai 'Bachchan' for his four volume autobiography, Kya Bhooloon Kya Yaad Karoon, Needa Ka Nirman Phir, Basere Se Door and Dashdwar se Sopan Tak.

Shankha Ghosh, the 1998 recipient of Saraswati Samman, went on to win India's highest literary honor Jnanpith Award in 2016. Three recipients of Saraswati Samman -- Manubhai Pancholi (1997), Govind Chandra Pande (2003), and Veerappa Moily (2014) -- received Moortidevi Award, considered the second highest after the Jnanpith Award, in 1987, 2000, and 2007, respectively.

== Awardees ==
Year	Image	Recipient	Work	Language	Ref.
1991		Harivansh Rai Bachchan	Autobiography in four volumes (Autobiography)	Hindi	
1992		Ramakant Rath	"Sri Radha" (Poetry)	Odia	
1993		Vijaya Tendulkar	"Kanyadaan" (Play)	Marathi	
1994		Harbhajan Singh	"Rukh Te Rishi" (Poetry collection)	Punjabi	
1995		Balamani Amma	"Nivedyam" (Poetry collection)	Malayalam	
1996		Shamsur Rahman Faruqi	"She`r-e Shor-Angez"	Urdu	
1997	Photo Unavailable	Manubhai Pancholi	"Kurukshetra"	Gujarati	
1998		Shankha Ghosh	"Gandharba Kabita Guccha" (Poetry collection)	Bengali	
1999	Photo Unavailable	Indira Parthasarathy	"Ramanujar" (Play)	Tamil	
2000		Manoj Das	"Amruta Phala" (Novel)	Odia	
2001		Dalip Kaur Tiwana	"Katha Kaho Urvashi" (Novel)	Punjabi	
2002		Mahesh Elkunchwar	"Yugant" (Play)	Marathi	
2003	Phot Unavailable	Govind Chandra Pande	"Bhagirathi" (Poetry collection)	Sanskrit	
2004		Sunil Gangopadhyay	"Pratham Alo" (Novel)	Bengali	
2005		K. Ayyappa Panicker	"Ayyappa Panikarude Kritikal" (Poetry collection)	Malayalam	
2006		Jagannath Prasad Das	"Parikrama" (Poetry collection)	Odia	
2007		Naiyer Masud	"Taoos Chaman Ki Myna" (Short stories collection)	Urdu	
2008		Lakshmi Nandan Bora	"Kayakalpa" (Novel)	Assamese	
2009		Surjit Paatar	"Lafzan Di Dargah"	Punjabi	
2010		S. L. Bhyrappa	"Mandra"	Kannada	
2011	Photo Unavailable	A. A. Manavalan	"Irama Kathaiyum Iramayakalum"	Tamil	
2012		Sugathakumari	"Manalezhuthu" (Poetry collection)	Malayalam	Poetry Collection
2013		Govind Mishra	"Dhool Paudho Par" (Novel)	Hindi	Novel
2014		Veerappa Moily	"Ramayana Mahanveshanam" (Poetry)	Kannada	Poetry
2015		Padma Sachdev	"Chitt-Chete" (Autobiography)	Dogri	
2016		Mahabaleshwar Sail	"Hawthan" (Novel)	Konkani	Novel
2017		Sitanshu Yashaschandra	"Vakhar" (Poetry collection)	Gujarati	Poetry
2018		K Siva Reddy	"Pakkaki Ottigilite" (Poetry)	Telugu	Poetry
2019		Vasdev Mohi	"Chequebook" (Short Story Series)	Sindhi	Short Stories
2020	Photo Unavailable	Sharankumar Limbale	"Sanatan" (Novel)	Marathi	Novel
2021		Ram Darash Mishra	"Main to Yahan Hun" (Poetry)	Hindi	Poetry
2022	Photo Unavailable	Sivasankari	"Surya Vamsam" (Memoir)	Tamil	Memoir
2023		Prabha Varma	"Roudra Sathwikam" (Novel in verse)	Malayalam	Verse Novel
2024		Bhadreshdas Swami	"Swaminarayana Siddhanta Sudha"	Sanskrit	
2025		Dr. Ramkumar Mukhopadhyay	Hara Parbati Katha	Bengali	Novel

== Recipients by language ==
Saraswati Samman has been presented for works in sixteen languages. The 34 awardees from 1991 to 2024 wrote in the following languages:

Language	Number
Malayalam	4
Hindi	3
Marathi	3
Odia	3
Punjabi	3
Bengali	3
Tamil	2
Gujarati	2
Kannada	2
Sanskrit	2
Urdu	2
Assamese	1
Dogri	1
Konkani	1
Sindhi	1
Telugu	1

== See also ==
- Jnanpith Award, considered India's highest literary honor that is conferred by the Bharatiya Jnanpith.
- Moortidevi Award, another annual literary honor, regarded as the second highest, and also awarded by the Bharatiya Jnanpith.
