= K. K. Birla Foundation =

Indian arts and literature organisation

The K.K. Birla Foundation was established in 1991 by Krishna Kumar Birla in Delhi. Its mission is to promote literature (especially Hindi literature) and the arts, as well as education and social work. It regularly gets mentioned in the media for the awards it confers, including:

- the Saraswati Samman ₹1,500,000 (US$16,000) for literary work in any Indian language(22),
- the Vyas Samman ₹400,000 (US$4,200) for prose/poetry work in Hindi,
- the Bihari Puraskar ₹100,000 (US$1,000) for prose/poetry work in Hindi/Rajasthani, only authors from Rajasthan are eligible,
- the Shankar Puraskar ₹150,000 (US$1,600) for a work in Hindi concerning Indian philosophy, culture and/or art,
- the Vachaspati Puraskar ₹150,000 (US$1,600) for any work in Sanskrit,
- the G.D. Birla Award for Scientific Research ₹150,000 (US$1,600).

Saraswati Samman a literary recognition given annually by the KK Birla Foundation. Saraswati Samman carries a cash award of 15 lakh rupees, a citation and a plaque. Besides the Saraswati Samman, two other awards have been instituted by the KK Birla Foundation – the Vyas Samman (for Hindi works by Indian citizens) and Bihari Puraskar (for Hindi/Rajasthani works by Rajasthani writers), a literary and cultural organisation.

Noted Sindhi writer Vasdev Mohi will be honoured with 29th Saraswati Samman. He has been selected for his short stories collection:- Chequebook, published in 2012. This short stories collection talks about the agonies and sufferings of marginalized sections of the society. He has authored 25 books of poetry, stories and translations. He has also received the Sahitya Akademi Award.

== See also ==
- Birla family
- Manipuri Sahitya Parishad
- Sahitya Akademi
