= List of Sahitya Akademi Translation Prize winners for Malayalam =

List of winners of a literary honor in India

Part of a series on

Sahitya Akademi Awards
Category
Sahitya Akademi Award winners by language
- Assamese
- Bengali
- Bodo
- Dogri
- English
- Gujarati
- Hindi
- Kannada
- Kashmiri
- Konkani
- Maithili
- Malayalam
- Marathi
- Meitei (Manipuri)
- Nepali
- Odia
- Punjabi
- Rajasthani
- Sanskrit
- Santali
- Sindhi
- Tamil
- Telugu
- Urdu
Sahitya Akademi Translation Prizes
- Assamese
- Bengali
- Bodo
- Dogri
- English
- Gujarati
- Hindi
- Kannada
- Kashmiri
- Konkani
- Maithili
- Malayalam
- Marathi
- Meitei (Manipuri)
- Nepali
- Odia
- Punjabi
- Rajasthani
- Sanskrit
- Santali
- Sindhi
- Tamil
- Telugu
- Urdu
Sahitya Akademi Yuva Puraskar
- Assamese
- Bengali
- Bodo
- Dogri
- English
- Gujarati
- Hindi
- Kannada
- Kashmiri
- Konkani
- Maithili
- Malayalam
- Meitei (Manipuri)
- Marathi
- Nepali
- Odia
- Punjabi
- Rajasthani
- Sanskrit
- Santali
- Sindhi
- Tamil
- Telugu
- Urdu
Sahitya Akademi Bal Sahitya Puraskar
- Assamese
- Bengali
- Bodo
- Dogri
- English
- Gujarati
- Hindi
- Kannada
- Kashmiri
- Konkani
- Maithili
- Malayalam
- Meitei (Manipuri)
- Marathi
- Nepali
- Odia
- Punjabi
- Rajasthani
- Sanskrit
- Santali
- Sindhi
- Tamil
- Telugu
- Urdu
Related
- Eighth Schedule to the Constitution of India
- Official Languages Commission
- List of languages by number of native speakers in India

Sahitya Akademi Translation Prizes are given each year to writers for their outstanding translations work in the 24 languages, since 1989.

== Recipients ==
Following is the list of recipients of Sahitya Akademi translation prizes for their works written in Malayalam. The award, as of 2019, consisted of ₹50,000.

Year	Translator	Title of the translation	Original Title	Original Language	Genre	Original Author	References
1989	K. Ravi Verma	Ganadevata	Ganadevata	Bengali	Novel	Tarasankar Bandyopadhyay	
1990	E. K. Divakaran Potti	Godanam	Godaan	Hindi	Novel	Premchand	
1991	M. Narayanan Kutty	Kalithoka	Kalittokai	Tamil	Poetry	Various poets	
1992	M. N. Satyarthy	Swapnangalude Ghoshayatra	Khwabon Ki Barat	Urdu	Novel	Krishan Chander	
1993	Leela Sarkar	Aranyathinte Adhikaaram	Aranyer Adhikar	Bengali	Novel	Mahasweta Devi	
1994	P. Madhavan Pillai	Mayadasinte Malika	Mayyadas Ki Maadee	Hindi	Novel	Bhisham Sahni	
1995	V. D. Krishnan Nampiar	Thavalam Illathavar	Khanabadosh	Punjabi	Autobiography	Ajeet Cour	
1996	M. P. Chandrasekharan Pillai	Jnaneshwari	Jnaneshwari	Marathi	commentary	Sant Jnaneshwar	
1997	Attoor Ravi Varma	J.J. Chila Kurippukal	J.J. Chila Kurippukal	Tamil	Novel	Sundara Ramaswamy	
1998	V. K. Hariharan Unnithan	Kamaayani	Kamaayani	Hindi	Poetry	Jaishankar Prasad	
1999	Shatrughan	Mathurapuri	The Wrath of an Emperor	English	Novel	Kulapati K.M. Munshi	
2000	K. T. Ravi Varma	Raja Ravi Varma	Raja Ravi Varma	Marathi	Biography	Ranjit Desai	
2001	P. K. Chandran & T. R. Jayasree	Karnan	Mrityunjaya	Marathi	Novel	Shivaji Sawant	
2002	Damodaran Kaliyath	Simhasanam	Simhasan	Marathi	Novel	Arun Sadhu	
2003	M. P. Kumaran	Heerak Deepti	Heerak Deepti	Bengali	Novel	Sunil Gangopadhyay	
2004	Puthussery Ramachandran	Kulasekhara Aalvarude Perumal Thirumozhi	Perumal Thirumozhi	Tamil	Poetry	Kulasekhara Alvar	
2005	T. B. Venugopala Panicker	Konnanthoppu	Koonanthoppu	Tamil	Novel	Thoppil Mohamed Meeran	
2006	N. Gopalakrishnan & P. M. Narayanan	Shree Radha	Shree Radha	Oriya	Poetry	Ramakanta Rath	
2007	K. S. Visvambharadas	Njan Atijeevicha Agnipareekshakal	Kolhatyacha Por	Marathi	Novel	Kishor Shantabai Kale	
2008	Jessy Aravindakshan	Aparichithar	Apne Apne Ajnabi	Hindi	Novel	S. H. Vatsyayan	
2009	K. Radhakrishna Warrier	Hrudayattinde Swaram	The Voice Of The Heart	English	Autobiography	Mrinalini Sarabhai	
2010	Panmana Ramachandran Nair	Narayaneeyam	Narayaniyam	Sanskrit	Poetry	Melpathur Narayana Bhattathiri	
2011	K. B. Prasannakumar	Meerayum Mahatmavum	Mira And Mahatma	English	Novel	Sudheer Kaker	
2012	Anand	Kavi Bandya Ghatigayiyute Jeevithavum Maranavum	Kobi Bandyaghati Goye Jeeban O Mrithyu	Bengali	Novel	Mahasweta Devi	
2013	Ulloor M. Parameswaran	Thiruvachakam	Thiruvasagam	Tamil	Classical Poetry	Manikkavacakar	
2014	Priya A. S.	Kunju Karyangalude Odeythampuran	The God of Small Things	English	Novel	Arundhati Roy	
2015	K. C. Ajayakumar	Gora	Gora	Bengali	Novel	Rabindranath Tagore	
2016	N. K. Desam	Geethanjali	Gitanjali	Bengali/English	Poetry	Rabindranath Tagore	
2017	K. S. Venkitachalam	Agrahaarathile Poocha	Selection	Tamil	Short stories	Jayakanthan	
2018	M. Leelavathy	Sreemad Valmeeki Ramayana	Sreemad Valmeeki Ramayana	Sanskrit	Poetry	Valmiki	
2019	C. G. Rajagopal	Sriramacharithamanasam (Thulasidasaramayanam)	Shree Ramacharithamanasa	Hindi	Poetry	Tulsidas	
2020	Sudhakaran Ramanthali	Sikharasooryan	Sikharasoorya	Kannada	Novel	Chandrashekhara Kambara	
2021	Sunil Naliyath	Bashai Tudu	Operation Bashai Tudu	Bengali	Novel	Mahasweta Devi	
2022	Chathanath Achuthanunni	Vamanacharyante Kavyalankarasutravrithi	Kavyalankarasutravrithi	Sanskrit	Poetry	Vamanacharya	
2023	P. K. Radhamani	Aksharangalude Nizhalil	Aksharon Kay Sayee	Hindi	Autobiography	Amrita Pritam	
2024	K.V. Kumaran	Yaanam	Yaana	Kannada	Novel	S.L. Bhairappa	

== See also ==
- List of Sahitya Akademi Award winners for Malayalam
