= Assi Ghat =

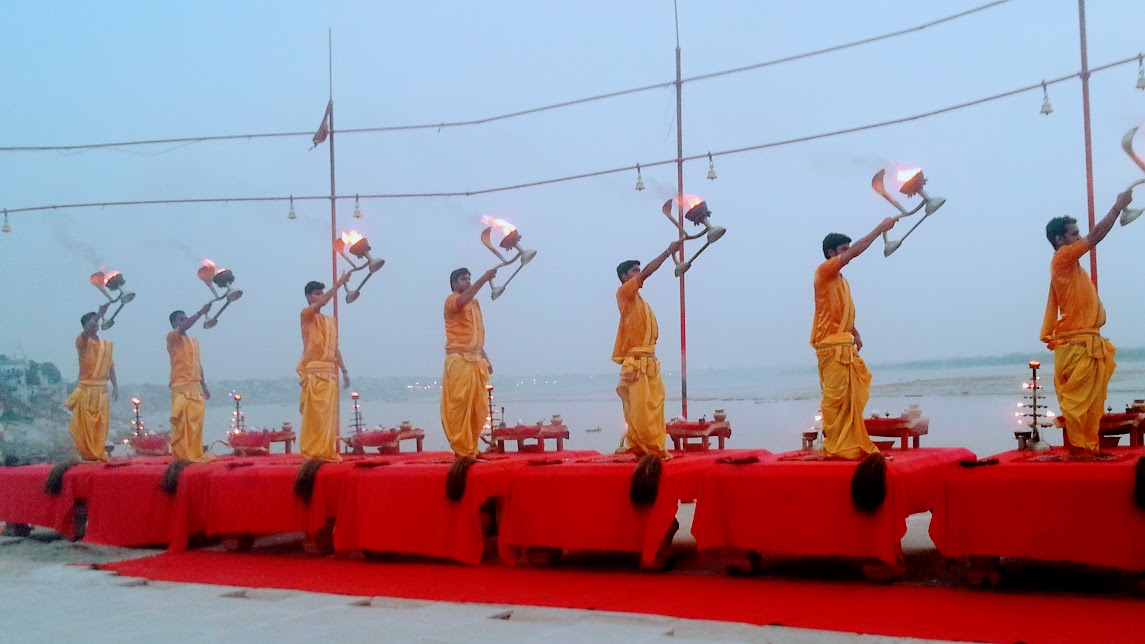
- Morning aarti at Assi Ghat

Religion
- Affiliation: Hinduism

Location
- State: Uttar Pradesh
- Country: India
- Interactive map of Assi Ghat
- Coordinates: 25°17′19.132″N 83°0′24.342″E

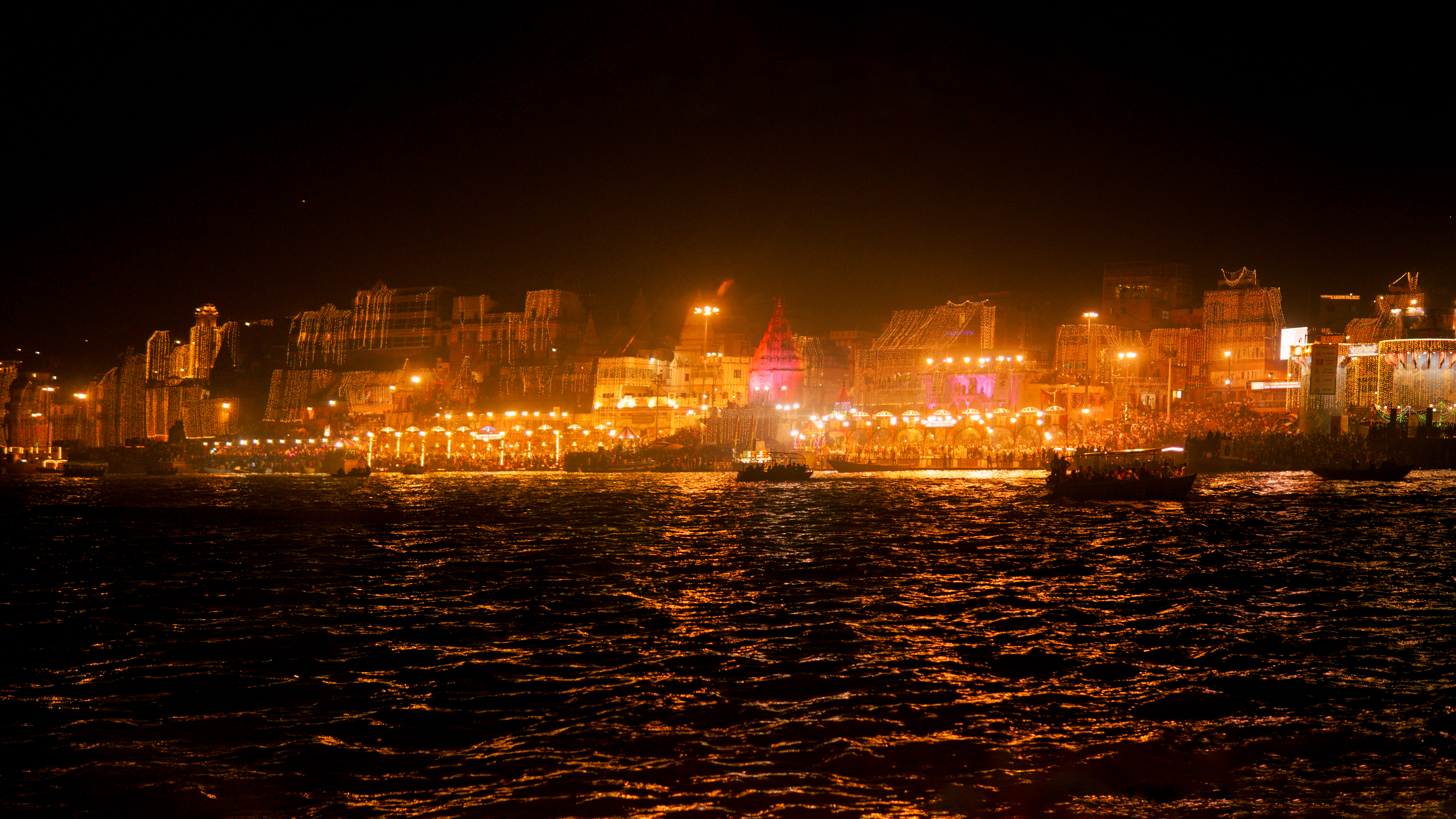
Assi Ghat during Dev Dipawali.

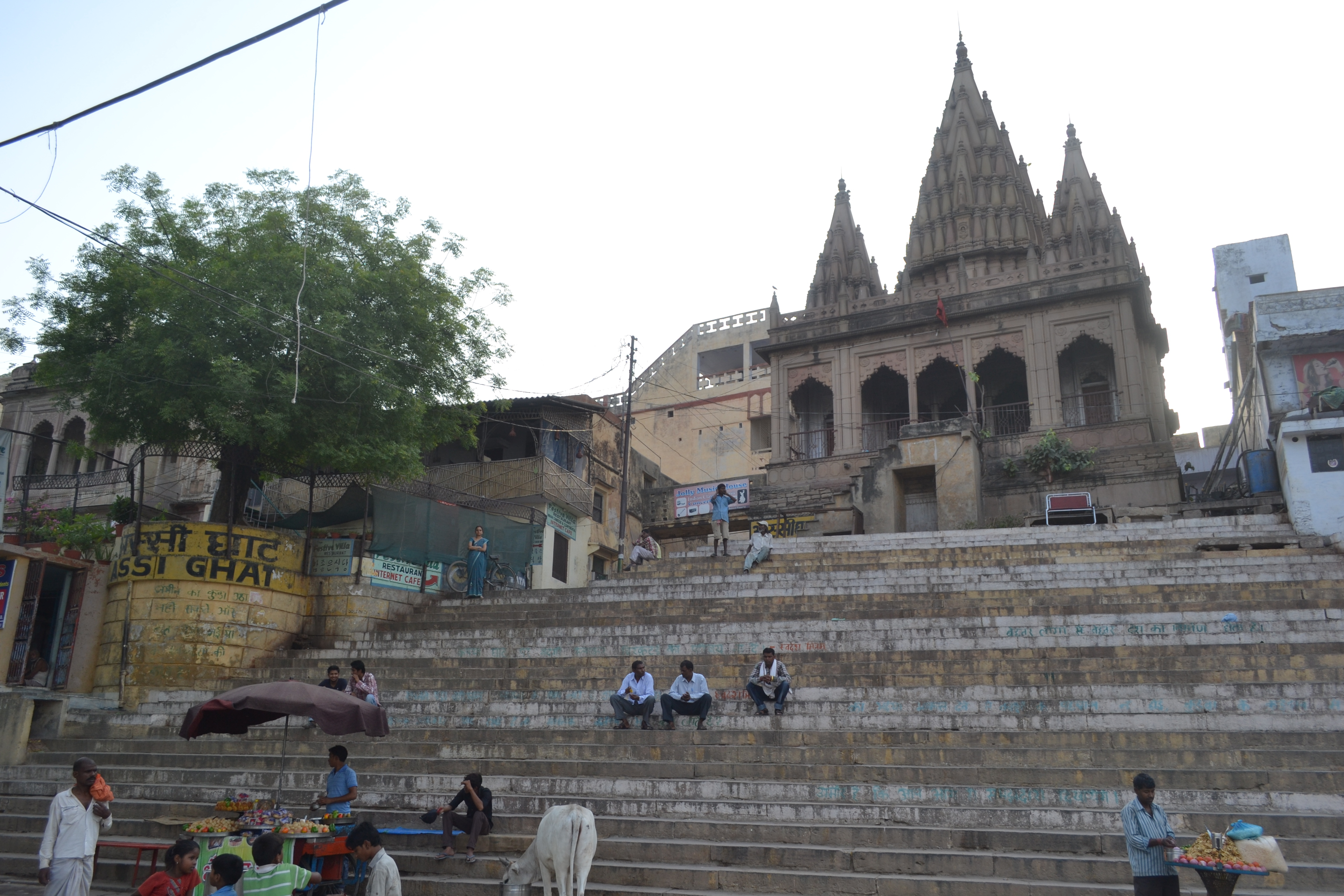
Assi Ghat

Assi Ghat is the southernmost ghat in Varanasi, India. To most visitors to Varanasi, it is known for being a place where long-term foreign students, researchers, and tourists live. The ghat hosts Subah-e-Banaras, a cultural and spiritual event, in the mornings.

== Tourism ==
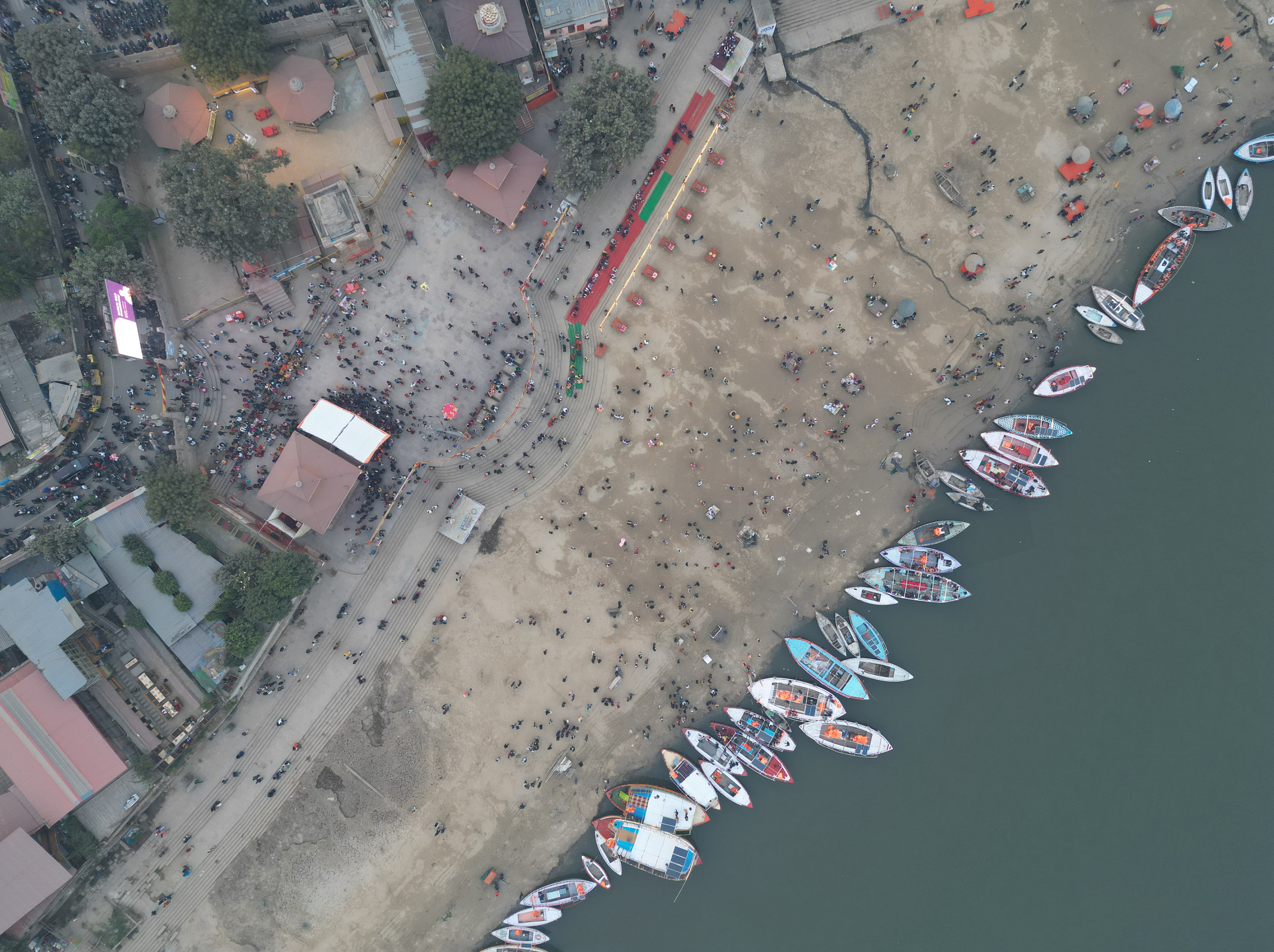
Drone shot of Assi Ghat in 2022

The Assi Ghat is the southernmost ghat in Varanasi. It is one of the biggest ghats in Varanasi. The Assi and Ganges rivers converge at Assi Ghat. To most visitors in Varanasi, it is known for being a place where long-term foreign students, researchers, and tourists live. Assi Ghat is one of the ghats often visited for recreation and during festivals. Most of the people visiting the ghat on usual days are students from the nearby Banaras Hindu University. The ghat accommodates about 22,500 people. During iconic Dev Deepawali festival, more than 600,000 tourists visit the ghat.

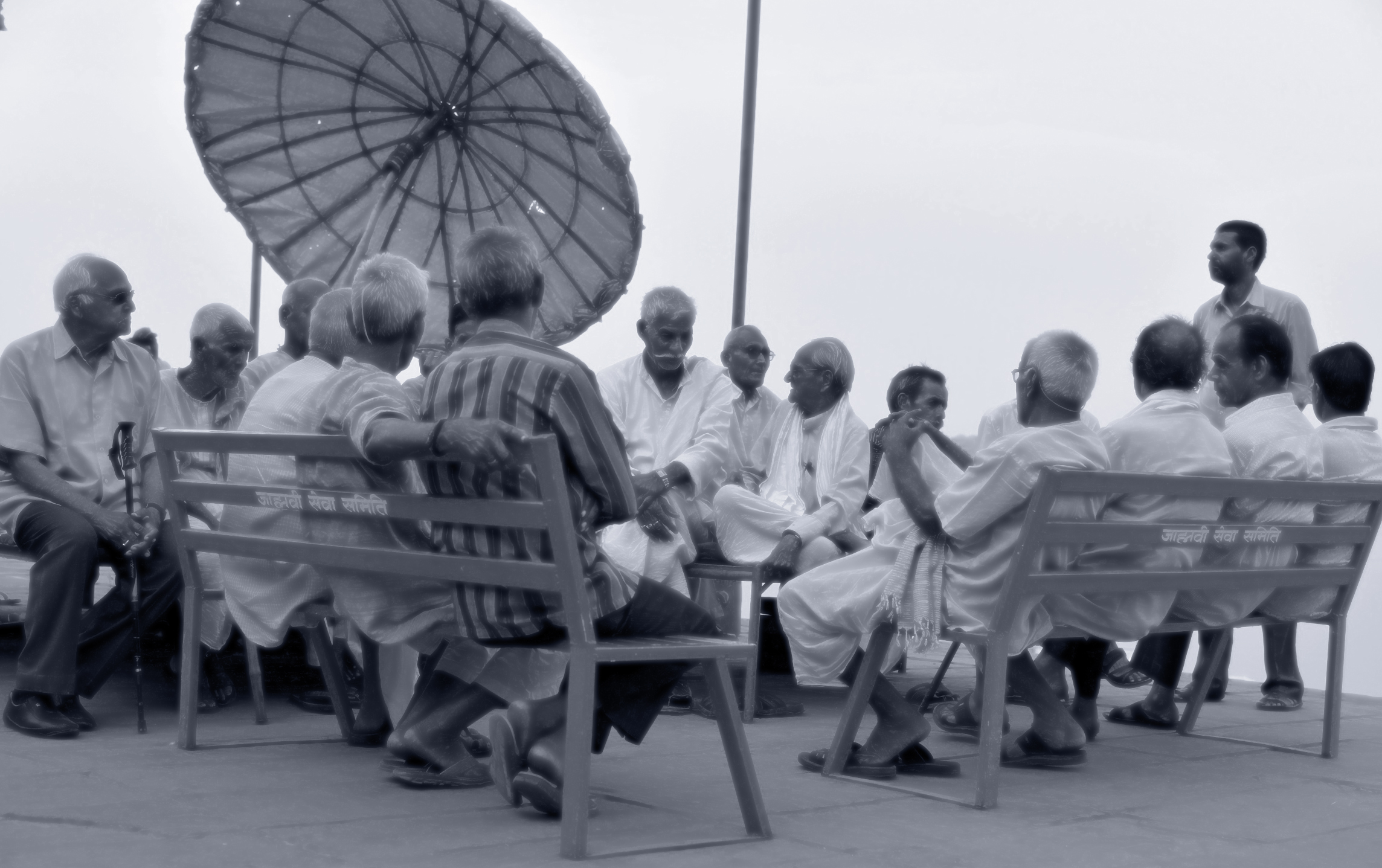
Old people in group chat in the evening at Assi Ghat

Hindus believe that it was at Assi Ghat that Tulsidas left for his heavenly abode.

After the 2010 Varanasi bombing the city commissioned extra police to the Assi Ghat neighborhood in order to more quickly resolve problems which tourists might have.

=== Subah-e-Banaras ===
Subah-e-Banaras, an early morning session before dawn (sunrise) started on 2014 by Minister of State, Uttar Pradesh Government. A committee has been constituted to glorify and propagate the celestial moments of Subah-e-Banaras for spiritual development. People from all walks of life joined hands together to perpetuate the early hour's effort to feel within existence of Almighty and grandeur of Nature. It is daily session which last for 2 hours and is free of cost.

==== Activities ====
1. Morning Vedic enchanting and Nature’s welcome.
2. Vedic Yagya.
3. Tribute to five elements of life, Pancha Tattva.
4. Music – Morning Raga, Classical/Semi classical by expert artists.
5. Yoga classes - To shape perfectly physically as well metaphysically.

== In popular culture ==
- Kashinath Singh's Hindi novel Kashi Ka Assi is set in the mohalla near the ghat. The novel was adapted into Mohalla Assi, a 2018 Bollywood film starring Sunny Deol and directed by Chandra Prakash Dwivedi, which is set in the mohalla (locality) around Assi Ghat.
- Raanjhanaa, a 2013 film which is also a Varanasi-based story, also has scenes of the "Assi Ghat".
- Masaan, a 2015 drama film directed by Neeraj Ghaywan has scenes of Vatika Cafe of the Assi Ghat.
