= Mrityunjay (TV series) =

- Also known as: Karn
- Genre: Historical drama
- Created by: Chandraprakash Dwivedi
- Based on: Mrityunjay by Shivaji Sawant
- Written by: Chandraprakash Dwivedi; Vasant Dev; Ashok Mishra
- Directed by: Chandraprakash Dwivedi
- Creative director: Chandraprakash Dwivedi
- Starring: Rajendranath Zutshi; Rajendra Gupta; Suraj Chaddha; Surendra Pal; Prakash Dwivedi
- Narrated by: Rajendranath Zutshi
- Theme music composer: Ashit Desai
- Composers: Ashit Desai; Uday Mazumdar
- Country of origin: India
- Original language: Hindi
- No. of seasons: 1
- No. of episodes: 13

Production
- Producers: Murli Manohar Singh, Jamshed Ashraf
- Production location: Mumbai
- Cinematography: Sanjeev Shrivastav
- Editor: Arunabh Mukharjee
- Running time: 25 minutes

Original release
- Network: DD National

Mrityunjay is an Indian television series based on the Marathi novel by Shivaji Sawant, produced by Jamshaid Ashraf and directed by Dr. Chandraprakash Dwivedi. It was telecast on Doordarshan in 1996. The series takes a look at the events in the Mahabharata

Though the series garnered many awards at the 3rd Screen Videocon Awards including Best Serial, Best Director (Dwivedi) and Best Art Direction (Muneesh Sappel), it was abruptly terminated for unknown reasons.

== Cast ==
- Karn - Rajendranath Zutshi
  - Karn (Young) - Abhishek Dwivedi
- Adhirath - Rajendra Gupta
- Bheeshm - Surendra Pal
- Dhritrashtra - S. P. Dubey
- Sanjay - Ishaan Trivedi
- Dronachary - Ram Gopal Bajaj/ Jairoop Jeevan
- Yudhisthir - Virendra Singh
- Bhim -
  - Bhim (Young) - Puru
- Arjun - Narendra Jha
  - Arjun (Young) - Sunny
- Duryodhan - Shrivallabh Vyas
  - Duryodhan (Young) - Raghav Soni
- Shakuni - Prakash Dwivedi
- Pandu - Suraj Chaddha
- Shon (Karn's Younger Brother) - Bakul Thakkar
  - Shon (Young) - Wajid Khan
- Vidur - Virendra Saxena
- Dushashan - Ravi Jhankal
  - Dushashan (Young) - Sharik Ashraf
- Kripacharya - Chand Dhar
- Ashwatthama - Ashok Lokhande
  - Ashwatthama (Young) - Prasad Barve
- Ved Vyas - Ashok Mishra
- Durvasa - Shiv Kumar Subramaniam
- Madri - Ashwini Kalsekar
- Ambalika - Asha Sharma
- Gandhari - Meenal Karpe
- Radha Mata - Meghna Roy
- Kunti - Neena Gupta
- Ambika - Poonam Jha
- Sarathi (in Episode 2) - Ramshankar
