= Doodhnath Singh =

Hindi language writer, poet, and critic (1936–2018)

- Born: 17 October 1936; Sobantha, United Provinces, British India
- Died: 12 January 2018 (aged 81); Allahabad, Uttar Pradesh, India
- Education: M.A., Hindi
- Alma mater: University of Allahabad
- Occupations: Short-story writer, poet, literary critic
- Relatives: Kashinath Singh
- Writing career
- Language: Hindi

Doodhnath Singh (17 October 1936 – 12 January 2018) was an Indian Hindi language writer, critic and poet. Born in Ballia district of Uttar Pradesh, Singh studied Hindi at the University of Allahabad and served as a Professor there until 1994. In 2014, the government of Uttar Pradesh honoured him with Bharat Bharti Samman, the biggest literary award of Uttar Pradesh Hindi Sansthan.

Some of Singh's well known works were Sapaat Chehre Wala Aadmi, Aakhri Kalaam, Nishkaasan, Bhai Ka Shok Geet, Dharmakshetra-Kurukshetra and Surang se Lautate Huye. He was also a literary analyst and critic, poet and playwright.

== Early life ==
Born on 17 October 1936 in Sobantha village of Ballia district, Uttar Pradesh to Devkinandan Singh, a farmer, Doodhnath Singh was the eldest of three brothers. His was a family of limited means and after completing his primary schooling from a government school in a nearby village, Singh attended the Merchant Inter College in Chitbara Gaon. At an early age, he developed a keen interest in reading and kept books with him while taking his cattle for grazing. When other shepherds teased him, he climbed on the branches of trees to read his books. With the support of his uncle he completed his graduation and on the recommendation of the then district magistrate of Ballia, Singh later shifted to Allahabad and received his Master of Arts degree in Hindi literature from Allahabad University.

== Career ==
Singh was the principal of Rangoota High School, Kolkata before becoming the sub-editor of a Hindi literature magazine. Here he came in contact with Sumitranandan Pant and was appointed an assistant professor of Hindi language in Allahabad University, a post he held till his retirement in 1994. Some of Singh's well known works were Sapaat Chehre Wala Aadmi, Aakhri Kalaam, Nishkaasan, Maai Ka Shok Geet, Dharmakshetra-Kurukshetra and Surang se Lautate Huye. He also authored three collections of poems, Ek Aur Bhi Aadmi Hai, Agli Shatabdi Ke Naam and Yuva Khusboo. He was also a literary critic and published his analysis of the works of Suryakant Tripathi 'Nirala', Mahadevi Varma and Gajanan Madhav Muktibodh.

Singh was a recipient of Bharat Bharti Award and Maithlisharan Gupta Samman, highest literary honours of Uttar Pradesh and Madhya Pradesh respectively. He was also the national president of Janwadi Lekhak Sangh. Along with Gyan Ranjan, Kashinath Singh and Ravindra Kalia, he was known as the "Four friends of Hindi".

== Personal life and death ==
Singh was married to Nirmala Thakur. In October 2017, while he was admitted at New Delhi's All India Institutes of Medical Sciences, Singh was diagnosed with prostate cancer. On 26 December, he returned to Allahabad. However, after his condition worsened, Singh was admitted to Phoenix hospital where he suffered cardiac arrest and was placed on life support. He died on 12 January 2018. He was survived by two sons and one daughter. As per his wishes his eyes were donated. Singh's death was condoled by the former chief minister, Akhilesh Yadav and he was cremated at Rasulabad Ghat, where as per traditions, his elder son Animesh Thakur performed his funeral rites.

== Bibliography ==
=== Stories ===
- Sapaat Chehre Wala Aadmi (सपाट चेहरे वाला आदमी)
- Sukhant (सुखान्त)
- Premkatha Ka Ant Na Koi (प्रेमकथा का अंत न कोई)
- Mai Ka Shokgeet (माई का शोकगीत)
- Dharmakshetra-Kurukshetra (धर्मक्षेत्रे कुरुक्षेत्रे)
- Too Foo (तू फू)
- Jalmurgiyon Ka Shikar (जलमुर्गियों का शिकार)

=== Novels ===
- Aakhri Kalaam (आखिरी कलाम)
- Nishkashan (निष्कासन)
- Namo Andhkaar (नमो अन्धकारं)

=== Poetry collections ===
- Apni Shatabdi Ke Naam (अपनी शताब्दी के नाम)
- Ek Aur Bhi Aadmi Hai (एक और भी आदमी है)
- Yuva Khusboo (युवा खुशबू)
- Tumhare Liye (तुम्हारे लिए)
- Surang Se Lautte Huye (सुरंग से लौटते हुए)

=== Play ===
- Yamgatha (यमगाथा)

=== Criticism ===
- Nirala: Atmahanta Aastha (निराला : आत्महंता आस्था)
- Mahadevi (महादेवी)
- Muktibodha: Sahitya Mein Nayi Pravittian (मुक्तिबोध : साहित्य में नई प्रवृत्तियां)

=== Editor ===
- Tarapath (तारापथ (पंत))
- Bhuveneshwar Samagra (भुवनेश्वर समग्र)
- Do Sharan (दो शरण (निराला))
- Ek Shamsher Bhi Hai (एक शमशेर भी है)
- Ot Mein Khada Mai Bolta Hoon (ओट में खड़ा मैं बोलता हूं (केदारनाथ अग्रवाल))
- Saat Bhoomikayein (सात भूमिकाएं (महादेवी))

=== Memoir ===
- Laut Aa o Dhar (लौट आ ओ धार)
