= Assi River =

Assi River Asi River
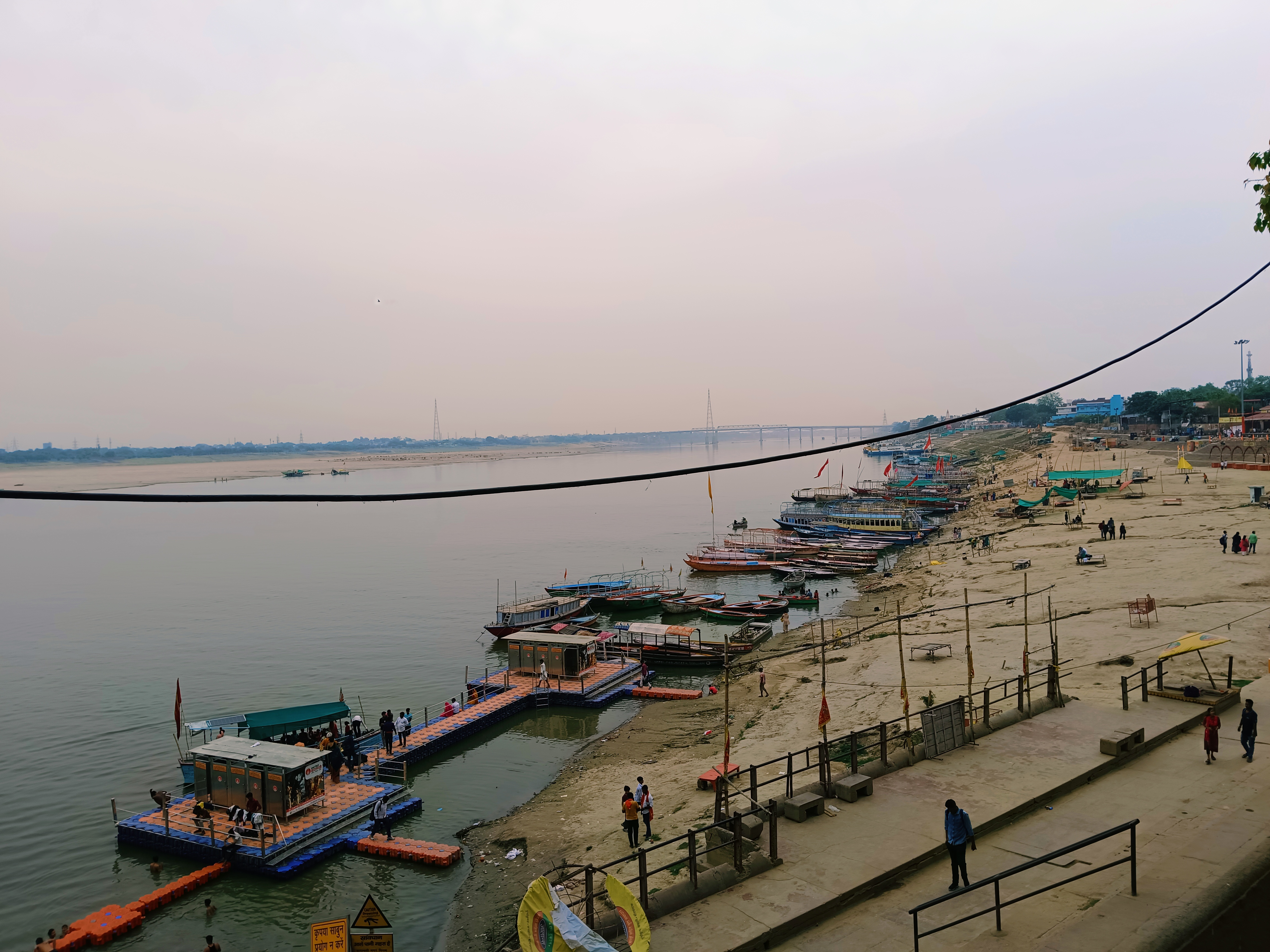
- Native name: अस्सी, असी or असि (Hindi)

Location
- Country: India
- Flows through: Varanasi, Uttar Pradesh

Physical characteristics
- Source: Varanasi
  - coordinates: 25°16′16″N 82°58′38″E
- Mouth
  - location: Ganges (in Varanasi)
  - coordinates: 25°16′59″N 83°00′35″E
- Length: 8 km (5.0 mi)

Basin features
- River system: Ganges

The Assi (Hindi: अस्सी) or Asi (Hindi: असी Asī or असि Asi [ˈʌsi]) is a small river in the city of Varanasi in the Indian state of Uttar Pradesh. It is a minor tributary of the river Ganges. Assi River is mentioned in ancient scriptures such as the Padma Purana, Matsya Purana, Agni Purana and Kurma Purana. According to the Vamana Purana, the river was created by the gods alongside the Varuna River. The river is eight kilometers long. The Assi River is also referred to as Assi Nala by many locals, including the Varanasi administration.

== History ==
The Assi River has its source in the southern suburbs of Varanasi near the campus of Banaras Hindu University and meanders about five kilometers northeast. Originally, it emptied into the Ganges at Assi Ghat, the southernmost of the Ghats of Varanasi. In 1981/1982, the course of the Assi was artificially changed, and the mouth was relocated around 500 meters to the south.

The Assi River originates in Kandwa of Varanasi and flows through Chitaipur, Karaundi, Karmajitpur, Newada, Sarai Nandan, Naria, Saket Nagar Nagwa before joining the Ganges.

Although little more than a small trickle, the Assi River is of some importance because of its association with the Hindu holy city of Varanasi. According to traditional belief, the Assi River, along with the Ganges and the Varuna River to the north, marks the boundaries of Varanasi as a sacred space. The name Varanasi is therefore derived from the river names Varuna and Assi. However, it is more likely that the Varuna River alone, which was also known in older literature under the name Varanasi, gave the city its name.

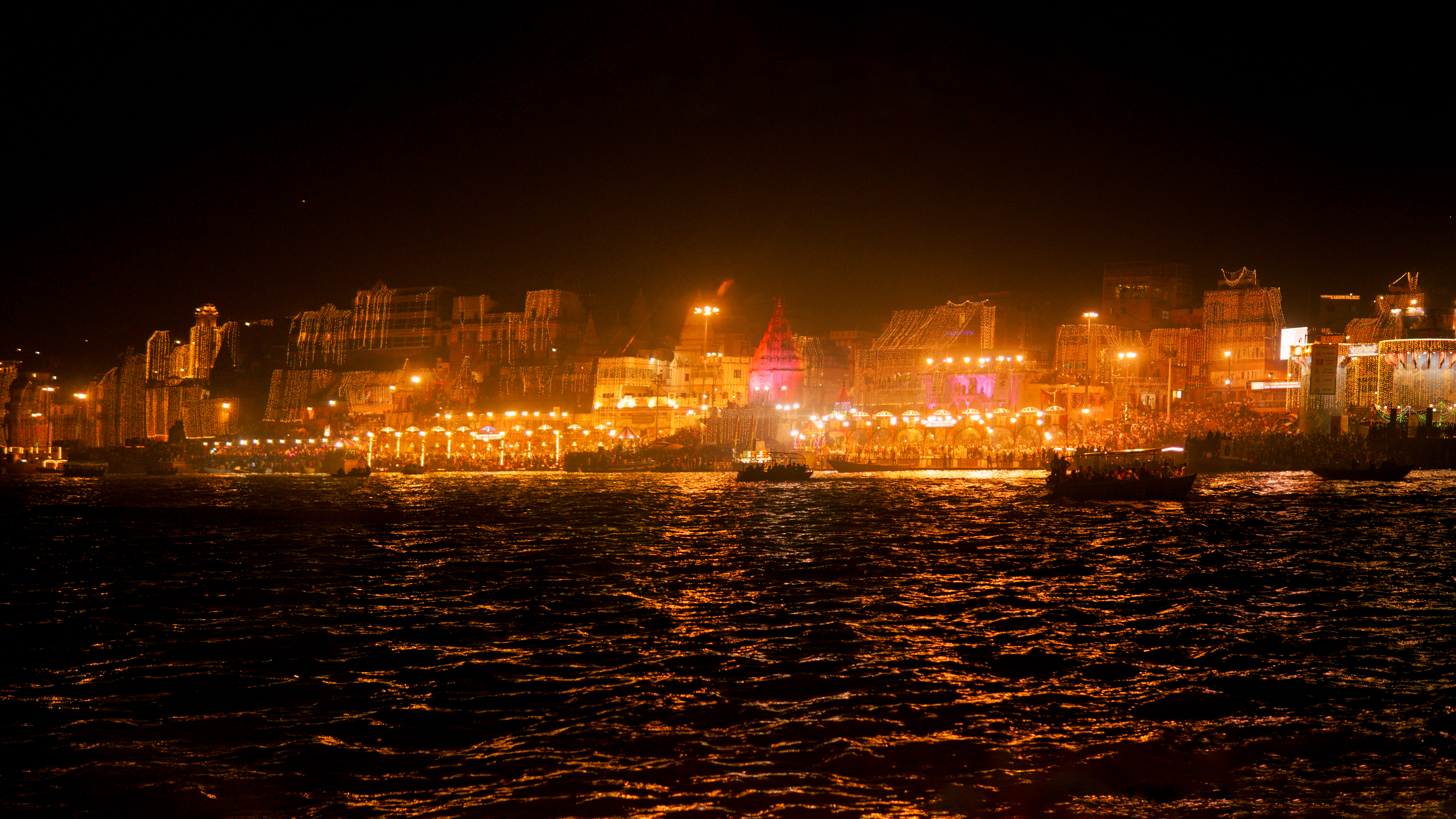
Assi River used to flowed into Ganges at Assi Ghat, Varanasi and Assi Ghat gets its name from the river.

In 2017, a diversion was created by constructing a sewage-pumping system, resulting in a shift of the Assi River's confluence with the main river approximately one kilometer upstream.

== Mythology ==
The river is mentioned in the Puranas. According to mythological beliefs, Mahadev Kund was built at the spot where the goddess Durga threw her sword after slaying the demons named Sumbha and Nisumbha, and the Assi River originated from the water that emerged from it.

== Pollution ==
The Assi River is affected by pollution as it receives wastewater from over two dozen nalas (sewers) located in Varanasi. In 2012, local residents of Varanasi established the Assi Nadi Mukti Abhiyan, a social organisation dedicated to removing encroachments and restoring the Assi River to its original state.

The National Green Tribunal (NGT) established a committee to devise a restoration plan for the Assi River. The committee's mid-2021 report proposed conducting a survey to assess encroachments in the catchment area and mapping pollution sources to address the issue of sewage-related pollution.

In 2023, Denmark committed to providing ₹1,000 crores to the Government of Uttar Pradesh at UP's Global Investors Summit for the cleanup of the Ganga River and its tributaries. However, the allocation of resources and timeline for the Assi River remained uncertain.

== See also ==
- Assi Ghat
- Varuna River
