= Narendra Jha =

Indian actor

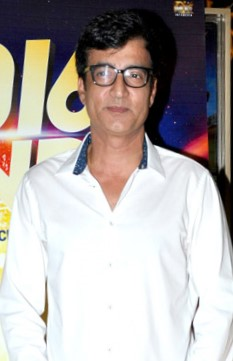
- Jha at the trailer launch of the film 2016 The End in 2016
- Born: 21 January 1964; Koilakh, Madhubani, Bihar, India
- Died: 14 March 2018 (aged 54); Nashik, Maharashtra, India
- Occupation: Actor
- Years active: 1992–2018
- Spouse: Pankaja Thakur (m. 2015)

Narendra Jha (21 January 1964 – 14 March 2018) was an Indian actor. He was known for his work in Bollywood productions; his most noted films being Haider, Raees, Ghayal Once Again, Hamari Adhuri Kahani, Mohenjodaro, Shorgul, My Father Iqbal, Force 2, Kaabil, 2016 The End and Doordarshan's Shanti. He last appeared in the action film Race 3. He is known for playing antagonist roles in mythological serials like Ravana and Arjuna.

== Career ==
Narendra Jha studied ancient history for his post-graduation in JNU where he also prepared for civil services, according to a blog written by journalist and writer Avijit Ghosh (Cinema Bhojpuri, 40 Retakes), who was his junior at the central university. As a child, Jha used to act in village plays in Madhubani, the blog says. But his professional journey as an actor began in 1992 when he enrolled in SRCC acting diploma course. When he came to Mumbai, he was flooded with modeling offers and he became a popular face of the ad world. Having done more than 20 TV serials, he was finalized to play an important role in the 2002 realised movie Funtoosh. The next year he was cast to play Habibur Rahman in the film Netaji Subhas Chandra Bose: The Forgotten Hero directed by Shyam Benegal. However, this association with Benegal continued and he again cast Jha to play Mohammed Ali Jinnah in Samvidhaan.

== Death ==
Jha had suffered a heart attack previously and on doctor's request had moved to Panvel in his Farmhouse with his wife. Jha died at his farmhouse in Nashik early on 14 March 2018 after suffering a massive heart attack. He was 54 years old.

== Filmography ==
=== Films ===
Year	Film	Role	Language
2018	Race 3	Interpol officer Khanna (posthumous release)	Hindi
2017	Mumbai Special 6	Mr. Raj Bansal	Hindi
2017	Raees	Musa Bhai	Hindi
2017	Kaabil	Police Officer Chaubey	Hindi
2017	Viraam	Abhiraj Malhotra	Hindi
2017	2016 The End	Pratap	Hindi
2016	Ghayal Once Again	Raj Bansal	Hindi
2016	Mohenjo Daro	Zakiro	Hindi
2016	Force 2	Anjan Das	Hindi
2016	Shorgul	Alam Khan	Hindi
2016	My Father Iqbal	Iqbal Khan	Hindi
2015	Hamari Adhuri Kahani	ACP Patil	Hindi
2014	Haider	Dr. Hilal Meer	Hindi
2014	Legend	Union Minister	Telugu
2012	Chand Ke Pare	Rajeev	Hindi
2007	Return of Hanuman	Rahu/Ketu	Hindi
2007	Eik Dasttak	Income Tax Officer	Hindi
2007	Yamadonga	Narayana	Telugu
2006	Kachchi Sadak		Hindi
2005	Chatrapathi	Baji Rao	Telugu
2004	Netaji Subhas Chandra Bose: The Forgotten Hero	Raja Habib Ur Rahman Khan	Hindi
2003	Fun 2shh: Dudes in the 10th Century	Commander	Hindi

=== Television ===
Year	TV show	Role
1994	Shanti	
1995	Captain House	
1996	Itihaas	
1996	Mrityunjay	Arjun
1997	Ek Aur Mahabharat	Arjun
1997	Jai Hanuman	Kubera
2000	Thief of Baghdad	Ahmed
1999	Geeta Rahasya	Rajkumar Arjun
2002	Aamrapali	Harsh (Amrapali's childhood love)
2002	Love In Bombay	Ravi (Indonesian TV Serial)
2002	Bhabhi	Mr. Majumdar
2004	Kyunki Saas Bhi Kabhi Bahu Thi	Shantanu Dey (Karishma's Husband)
2006	Raavan	Dasanan Ravan (10-headed Demon King of Lanka)
2007-2008	Chhoona Hai Aasmaan	Group Captain Aryaveer Pratap Singh
2009	Chehra	Karan, Garv's elder brother and India's best plastic surgeon
2011-2012	Havan	Hari Om Baapji
2012	SuperCops vs Supervillains	ACP Karanveer
2013	Ek Ghar Banaunga	Shashikant Garg
2013	The Buddy Project	Chandan Roy
2014	Samvidhaan	Muhammed Ali Jinnah
2015	Begusarai	Phulan Thakur
2017	Yog Guru Baba Ramdev (Biography)	
	Uttara Ramacharitham	
