= Mithilesh Chaturvedi =

Indian actor (1954–2022)

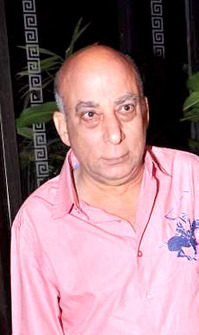
- Born: 15 October 1954; Lucknow, Uttar Pradesh, India
- Died: 3 August 2022 (aged 67); Lucknow, Uttar Pradesh, India
- Occupation: Actor
- Years active: 1997–2022
- Known for: Acting

Mithilesh Chaturvedi (15 October 1954 – 3 August 2022) was an Indian film and theatre actor.

== Biography ==
Chaturvedi worked in Koi... Mil Gaya, Gadar: Ek Prem Katha, Krrish, Satya, Mohalla Assi, and web series like Scam 1992: The Harshad Mehta Story. He worked with directors including Prem Tiwari, Kunwar Kalyan Singh, Bansi Kaul, Surya Mohan Kulshrestha, Dina Nath, Urmil Thapliyal, and Anupam Kher.

== Filmography ==
Year	Title	Director	Role
1997	Bhai Bhai	Sikander Bharti	
1998	Satya	Ram Gopal Verma	Builder Malhotra
1999	Taal	Subhash Ghai	Rambhajan
2000	Fiza	Khalid Mohamed	
2001	Gadar: Ek Prem Katha	Anil Sharma	Idris (Newspaper Editor)
2001	Aks	Rakesh Omprakash Mehra	PM's Aide
2001	Ashoka the Great	Santosh Sivan	Kalinga Minister
2002	Road	Rajat Mukherjee	Old man
2003	Koi... Mil Gaya	Rakesh Roshan	Mr.Mathur ( Computer Expert)
2003	Kayamat		Preet
2005	Kisna: The Warrior Poet	Subhash Ghai	Vishnu Prasad
2005	Sinndoor Tere Naam Ka		Girdhari Prasad
2005	Bunty Aur Babli	Shaad Ali	
2006	Krrish	Rakesh Roshan	Mr. Mathur (cameo)
2007	Gandhi, My Father	Feroz Abbas Khan	Zakaria
2008	Halla Bol	Rajkumar Santoshi	
2008	Krazzy 4	Jaideep Sen	
2009	Ajab Prem Ki Ghazab Kahani	Rajkumar Santoshi	Mr. Pinto
2011	Monica	Sushen Bhatnagar	Defence Lawyer
2011	Ready	Anees Bazmee	Pathak
2011	My Friend Pinto	Raaghav Dar	Matiyani
2013	Phata Poster Nikhla Hero	Rajkumar Santoshi	Biscuit
2014	Neeli Chatri Waale (TV series)		Aatmaram Chaubey
2015	Mohalla Assi	Chandra Prakash Dwivedi	Daya Singh
2016–2019	Bhabiji Ghar Par Hain!	Shashank Bali	Author Abhay Aashiyana, judge, dacoit and various characters
2019	Arjun Patiala	Rohit Jugraj	Bhatia ji
2019	Life Mein Time Nahi Hai Kisi Ko	Manoj Sharma	
2020	Scam 1992: The Harshad Mehta Story	Hansal Mehta	Ram Jethmalani
2021	Fiza Mein Tapish	Rahat Khan	Imam
2022	Banchhada		
2022	Dr. Arora	Sajid Ali; Archit Kumar	MLA Goyal's Chacha
2023	Taaza Khabar	Himank Gaur	Billimoriya
2023	Scam 2003	Tushar Hiranandani	Chief Minister
