= Ek Aur Mahabharat =

- Genre: Historical drama
- Created by: Chandraprakash Dwivedi
- Based on: Mahabharata
- Written by: Chandraprakash Dwivedi; Ramkumar Bhramar
- Directed by: Chandraprakash Dwivedi
- Creative director: Chandraprakash Dwivedi
- Starring: Samar Jai Singh; Rajendra Gupta; Suraj Chaddha; Surendra Pal; Prakash Dwivedi
- Country of origin: India
- Original language: Hindi
- No. of seasons: 1
- No. of episodes: 14

Production
- Production location: Mumbai
- Cinematography: Sanjeev Shrivastav
- Running time: 25 minutes

Original release
- Network: Zee TV

Ek Aur Mahabharat (English language translation: One More Mahabharat) is an Indian television series based on the Mahabharata directed by Chandraprakash Dwivedi It was telecast on Zee TV in 1997 while Dwivedi was the channel's programming head, but was terminated after 14 episodes.

== Cast ==
- Krishna - Suraj Chaddha
- Draupadi - Ashwini Kalsekar
- Karn - Samar Jai Singh
- Vrushali - Rajeshwari Sachdev
- Bheeshm - Surendra Pal
- Ganga - Prabha Sinha
- Dhritrashtra - S. P. Dubey / Rajendra Gupta
- Sanjay - Ishaan Trivedi / Lalit Parimoo
- Dronachary - Jairoop Jeevan
- Yudhisthir - Virendra Singh
- Bheem -
- Arjun - Narendra Jha
- Duryodhan - Shrivallabh Vyas
- Shakuni - Prakash Dwivedi
- Shon (Karn's Younger Brother) - Bakul Thakkar
- Vidur - Virendra Saxena/Lalit Tiwari
- Dushashan - Ravi Jhankal
- Kripacharya - Chand Dhar
- Drupad - Mithilesh Chaturvedi
- Adhirath - Rajendra Gupta
- Ashwatthama - Ashok Lokhande
- Ambalika - Asha Sharma
- Gandhari - Meenal Karpe
- Radha Mata - Meghna Roy
- Kunti - Neena Gupta
- Ambika - Poonam Jha
- Dhrishtadyumna - Anup Soni
- Balram - Zakir Hussain (actor)
- Satyavati - Shubhangi Fawle-Latkar
- Subandhu - Ravi Khanvilkar
