= Shivaji Sawant =

Indian novelist

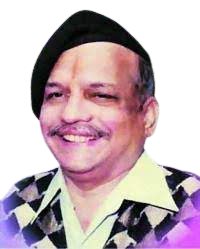
- Sawant in 1981
- Born: 31 August 1940; Ajara, Kolhapur district, Maharashtra, India
- Died: 18 September 2002 (aged 62); Panaji, Goa, India
- Other name: S.W.Sawant
- Occupations: Author, teacher, editor
- Notable work: Mrityunjay; Chhava; Yugandhar
- Awards: Moortidevi Award

Shivaji Sawant (31 August 1940 – 18 September 2002) was an Indian novelist and dramatist in the Marathi language. He is known as Mrutyunjaykaar (meaning Author of Mrutyunjay) for writing the famous Marathi novel - Mrutyunjay, his other noted works are Chhava and Yugandhar. He was the first Marathi writer to be awarded with the Moortidevi Award, given by the Bharatiya Jnanpith in 1994.

He wrote a book Mrutyunjay (English: Victory Over Death) based on Karna, one of the leading characters of the epic Mahabharat. This book was translated into Hindi (1974), English (1989), Kannada (1990), Gujarati (1991), Malayalam (1995) and received numerous awards and accolades. His novel Chhava, published in 1980, is based on the life of Chhatrapati Sambhaji Maharaj. Chhava was adapted into a 2025 hindi film of the same name directed by Laxman Utekar featuring Vicky Kaushal in the titular role.

He held the post of the vice-president of Maharashtra Sahitya Parishad since 1995. He was president of Baroda Sahitya Sammelan of 1983. He was not only a historical writer but also a political writer.

== Early life and education ==
Sawant was born in a small farmer family of Ajara village in Kolhapur district in Maharashtra. He finished his schooling from 'Vyankatrao High School Ajara', where he was a kabaddi player.

== Career ==
He started his career as a clerk in the court and later worked with Rajaram Prashala (Rajaram School), Kolhapur as a teacher from 1962 to 1974. Subsequently, he shifted to Pune, and remained the co-editor and later the editor of the monthly magazine Lokshikshan for six years in Pune (1974–1982), published by the Education Department of the Government of Maharashtra. From here, he took voluntary retirement in 1983 to devote himself completely to writing.

He remained the President of the "Baroda Marathi Sahitya Sammelan" held in Baroda in 1983, and later was the Vice President of Maharashtra Sahitya Parishad in 1995, a post he held for some years.

== Works ==
=== Books ===
- Mrityunjay (Novel)
- Chhava (Novel)
- Yugandhar (Novel)
- Kavadase
- Kanchan Kan
- Ladhat
- Ashi Mane Ase Namune
- Krantisihachi Gavran Boli (compilation)
- Purushottamnama-Annasaheb P.K.Patil

=== Dramas ===
- Mrityunjay
- Chhava
- Glimpse of the Past

=== Mrityunjay ===
Mrityunjay is a novel very famous in the Marathi compositions. It is based on Karna, one of the great warriors in the epic of Mahabharata. It was awarded with many of the prizes and awards given by the Jnanpith (Moorti Devi Award).

Mrityujaya was translated in many other languages. Dr P K chandran & Dr Jayashree translated the book in to Malayalam(Karnan), which won Kendra Sahitya Akademy Award for translation in the year 2001

=== Yugandhar ===
Yugandhar is another Novel of Sawant based on the life of Krishna, a great Hindu god in the Mahabharata and other narrative epics as well as the God of the Hindus. Yugandhar is one of the best and most famous Novels of the Marathi language and it is awarded with many of the prizes and awards given by the Sahitya Academy. And he also wrote Contemplation on Yugandhar. Kadambini Dharap has written an English translation of the book.

== Adaptations ==
In 1996, based on his novel Mrityunjay, a TV series by the same name directed by Chandraprakash Dwivedi. Based on the Marathi novel Chhava, Chhaava Hindi film was released on 14 February 2025, directed by Laxman Utekar.

== Personal life ==
Sawant was married to Mrinalini. He has a son Amitabh and daughter Kadambini.

On 18 September 2002, Sawant died at the age of 62 of cardiac arrest in Panaji, Goa. He was campaigning for the post of President of 76th All India Marathi Literary Conference.
