= Mohalla Assi =

- Theatrical release poster
- Directed by: Chandraprakash Dwivedi
- Screenplay by: Chandraprakash Dwivedi
- Dialogues by: Dr. Kashinath Singh; Chandraprakash Dwivedi
- Story by: Dr. Kashinath Singh
- Based on: Kashi Ka Assi by Dr. Kashinath Singh
- Produced by: Vinay Tiwari
- Starring: Sunny Deol; Sakshi Tanwar; Saurabh Shukla; Mukesh Tiwari; Ravi Kishan; Rajendra Gupta
- Cinematography: Vijay Kumar Arora
- Edited by: Aseem Sinha
- Music by: Songs: Amod Bhatt; Score: Amod Bhatt; Utpal Sharma
- Production company: Crossword Entertainment Pvt. Ltd.
- Distributed by: White Lion Entertainment Pvt. Ltd
- Release date: 16 November 2018
- Country: India
- Language: Hindi

Mohalla Assi (transl. The neighbourhood of Assi Ghat; Hindi pronunciation: [moːɦəllaː əssiː]) is a 2018 Indian Hindi-language satirical drama film starring Sunny Deol and Sakshi Tanwar, and directed by Dr. Chandraprakash Dwivedi.

The film is loosely based on Dr. Kashinath Singh's popular Hindi novel Kashi Ka Assi, a satire on the commercialisation of the pilgrimage city, and fake gurus who lure the foreign tourists. Assi Ghat is a ghat in Varanasi (Banaras) on the banks of Ganges River, and the film is based in a famous and historical 'Mohalla' (locality) by the ghat, on the southern end of Banaras. The film is a satirical drama that explores the commercialization of religion and the changing social and political landscape of Varanasi in the late 1980s and early 1990s. The film's supporting cast includes Saurabh Shukla, Mukesh Tiwari, Ravi Kishan and Rajendra Gupta.

Sunny Deol plays the lead role of Sanskrit teacher and an orthodox religious priest (Pandit) while Sakshi Tanwar plays his wife. The story of the film goes through the events in 1990 and 1989 including Ram Janmabhoomi movement and Mandal Commission implementation.

On 30 June 2015, the release of Mohalla Assi was stayed by a Delhi court for allegedly hurting religious sentiments. After several delays, Mohalla Assi finally released on 16 November 2018.

== Plot ==
The story revolves around an orthodox Brahmin priest and Sanskrit teacher, Pandit Dharmanath Pandey, and his struggle to hold on to his principles in the face of a rapidly modernizing world. He lives around the famous Assi Ghat in Varanasi, a place of deep religious and cultural significance.

Dharmanath is a staunch traditionalist who believes in the sanctity of his neighborhood. He is a respected priest but lives in poverty due to his rigid ideals. He is vehemently against the commercialization of the ghats and is particularly opposed to foreigners staying in the homes of Brahmins as paying guests, believing they will corrupt the sacred space.

The tale progresses against the backdrop of significant events in Indian history, including the Mandal Commission and the Ram Janmabhoomi movement. The story portrays how these political and social shifts affect the people of Varanasi. A central meeting point for a group of friends with differing ideologies is a local tea shop, which acts as a "mini-parliament" where they engage in passionate debates about politics, religion, and the changing culture of their city.

While Dharmanath maintains his strict beliefs, his loving wife Savitri is a more pragmatic and clear-headed woman who constantly reminds him of their financial struggles. Their low income makes it difficult to support their family. The conflict comes to a head when Dharmanath's daughter expresses a desire to attend computer classes, which her father's meager income cannot support. Faced with the reality of his family's needs, Dharmanath is forced to compromise on his principles. He is convinced by a tourist guide, Kanni Guru, to take in a French female tourist, Madeleine, as a paying guest and teach her Sanskrit.

This decision to let a foreigner woman into his home, even for a significant amount of money, creates a scandal in the community. Dharmanath must even move the sacred idol of Lord Shiva to accommodate the guest, an act that deeply shocks the other residents of Assi. The rest of story follows the fallout of this decision and Dharmanath's internal struggle as he grapples with the clash between his deeply held beliefs and the need to provide for his family in a changing world.

== Cast ==
- Sunny Deol as Dharamnath Pandey
- Sakshi Tanwar as Savitri Pandey – Dharamnath's wife
- Saurabh Shukla as Upadhyay
- Mukesh Tiwari as Radheshyam
- Ravi Kishan as Kanni Guru
- Rajendra Gupta as Virendra Shrivastava
- Seema Azmi as Ramdayi
- Sofia as Madeleine – Dharmnath's tenant whom he teaches Sanskrit
- Akhilendra Mishra as Tanni Guru
- Mithilesh Chaturvedi as Gaya Singh – Retired Principal
- Yeshna Dhar as Dharamnath and Savitri's daughter
- Daya Shankar Pandey as Shiva's imposter
- Raquel as Foreigner Sex worker
- Faisal Rashid as Nakka
- Davinder Singh
- Mohit Sinha
- Naresh Jang
- Vaibhav Mishra
- Shrichand Makhija
- Md. Rahman Jony
- Ishtiyaq Anas
- Ambujeshwar Pandey

== Production ==
Dwivedi had previously directed Pinjar (2003), starring Urmila Matondkar and Manoj Bajpayee, and most known for television epic Chanakya. Ameesha Patel was offered the female lead role but turned it down because of financial differences with the film's producer. Sakshi Tanwar was cast as her replacement.

The principal photography of the film started on 28 January 2011 on the sets erected at the Film City, Mumbai, later scenes were also shot in Varanasi where film is set.

== Music and soundtrack ==
Mohalla Assi

Soundtrack album by Amod Bhatt
- Genre: Feature film soundtrack
- Language: Hindi
- Label: Zee Music Company

The lyrics of the film's songs were penned by Gulzar and the music for the songs was composed by Amod Bhatt. The background score of the movie was done by Amod Bhatt and Utpal Sharma.

Track listing
| No. | Title | Singer(s) | Length |
|---|---|---|---|
| 1. | "Soch Mein Antar" | Udit Narayan, Madhushree | 3:12 |
| 2. | "Ganga Re Kabhi" | Sukhwinder Singh, Manoj Mishra, Ajay Jairam | 6:51 |

== Release ==
Mohalla Assi was initially delayed for three years as the film director had stopped the work claiming that he had not been paid his dues, The release date of Mohalla Assi was repeatedly pushed back and allegations of non-payment continued to surface through 2012. However, the film became eventually ready for release in October–November 2015.

After extended delays, on 12 June 2015 film's trailer was released, ahead on its late 2015 release. Shortly after, an FIR was filed in Varanasi against Deol and Dwivedi for the alleged use of abusive language in the film.

The film was banned by the CBFC on 8 April 2016.

On 11 December 2017, Delhi High Court allowed the release of the film with one cut and adult certification, setting aside the order of CBFC. After so many delays, Sunny Deol announced the release date on 21 September 2018. It was released on 16 November 2018.

=== Online piracy issue ===
Prior to its release, Mohalla Assi leaked online on 11 August 2015.

== Critical reception ==
It received negative reviews from critics. Jyoti Sharma Bawa of Hindustan Times stated that Mohalla Assi is a delight to watch film and gave it 2 out of 5 stars. Kunal Guha of Mumbai Mirror stated the film is a beautiful and realistic depiction of Varanasi's issues and gave it 1.5 out of 5 star. Troy Ribeiro of News18 stated that the film is verbose yet important and gave it 2 stars. Reza Noorani of Times of India stated "At two hours of runtime, 'Mohalla Assi' feels more like an anti-tourism commercial rather than a feature film" and gave it 2 stars.

== Box office ==
Mohalla Assi collected around 1.30 crore on first day. The fim grossed ₹ 14.49 crore in its first weekend in India. and lifetime 18.57cr.
