= Namvar Singh =

Indian literary critic, linguist and academic (1927–2019)

- Namvar Singh
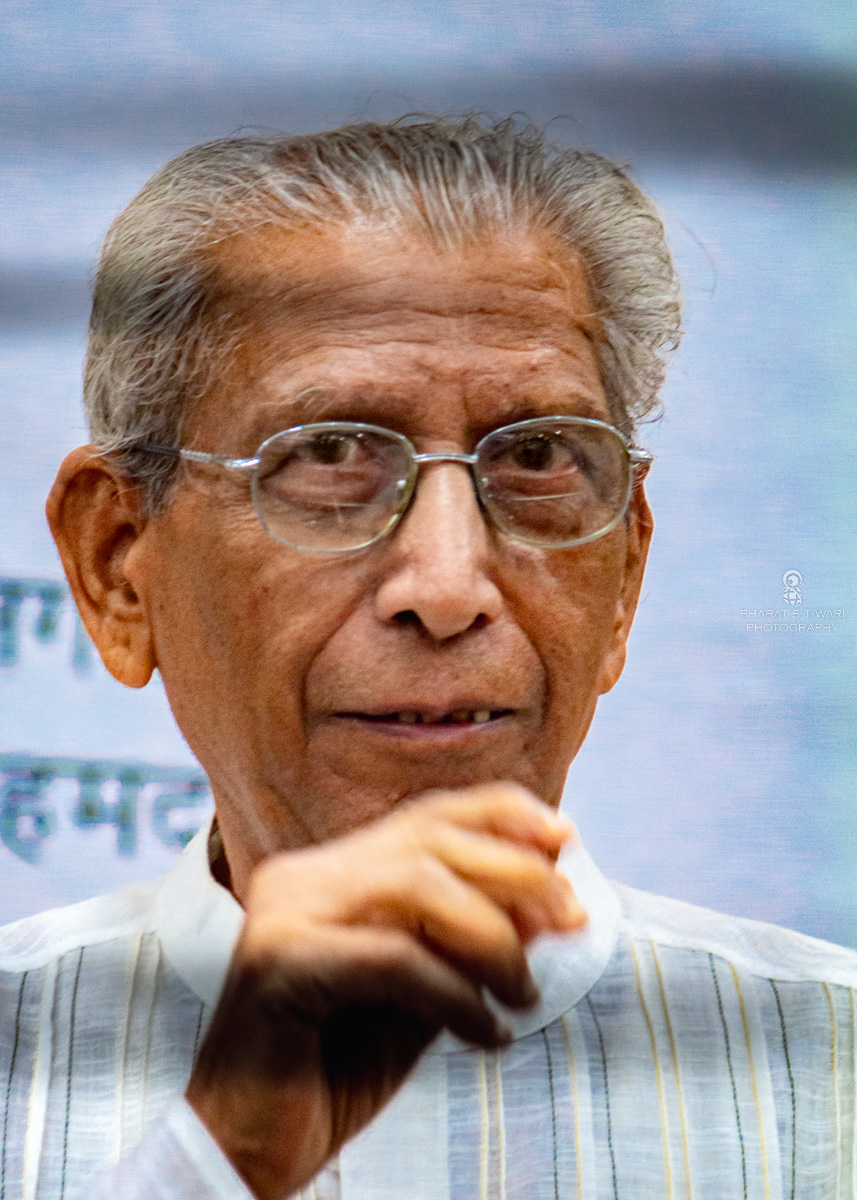
- Namvar Singh speaking at the launch of 'Aalochana' vol 53-54 (published by Rajkamal Prakashan), at Rabindra Bhawan, Sahitya Akademi
- Born: 28 July 1926; Varanasi, Uttar Pradesh, British India
- Died: 19 February 2019 (aged 92); Delhi, India
- Education: Banaras Hindu University
- Occupations: Writer, critic
- Relatives: Kashinath Singh (brother)
- Writing career
- Language: Hindi
- Notable works: Kavita Ke Naye Pratiman, Chhayavaad , Dusari Parampara Ki Khoj
- Notable awards: 1971: Sahitya Akademi Award; 1991: Shalaka Samman, Sahitya Bhushan Samman, Kuvempu Rashtreeya Puraskar

Namvar Singh (28 July 1926 – 19 February 2019) was an Indian literary critic, linguist, academician and theoretician. He received his doctorate degree from Banaras Hindu University where he also taught for some time. He served as a professor of Hindi literature in several other universities. He was the founder and first chairman of Jawaharlal Nehru University's Centre of Indian Languages and continued to remain as a professor emeritus after his retirement in 1992.

== Early life ==
Singh was born on 28 July 1926 in Jiyanpur village in Varanasi (now under Chandauli) District of Uttar Pradesh, India. He received his early education there. He then moved to Varanasi to pursue his further studies and did his matriculation and higher secondary education at Udai Pratap Autonomous College, Varanasi. He enrolled in Banaras Hindu University (BHU) for higher studies, where he completed his bachelor's in 1949 and master's with gold medal in 1951. He got the Ph.D. under the supervision of Hazari Prasad Dwivedi. His younger brother Kashinath Singh is also a writer.

== Career ==
After completing his Ph.D., Singh started teaching at Banaras Hindu University. For a brief period he also taught at Sagar University. His association with the two universities ended due to his communist activities. He later became a professor of Hindi at Jodhpur University. At Jawaharlal Nehru University (JNU), he created a new pattern of teaching and prepared the curriculum. He was the founder and first chairman of JNU's Centre of Indian Languages. He retired from JNU in the year 1992. After his retirement, he served as a professor emeritus at the Center of Indian Languages at JNU.

In 1959, Singh unsuccessfully contested the general election as a Communist Party of India (CPI) candidate from the Chandauli constituency in Uttar Pradesh. He polled over 18,000 votes, finishing a distant third. 5b

Apart from his academic engagement, Singh worked as the editor of a weekly news magazine Janyuga, and Alochana, a Hindi magazine for literary criticism. Following his retirement from JNU he was appointed the Chancellor of Mahatma Gandhi Antarrashtriya Hindi Vishwavidyalaya, Wardha. He also worked as the chairman of the Raja Rammohun Roy Library Foundation. Singh also served as the chairman of the selection board for the Jnanpith Award.

Namvar Singh died on 19 February 2019 in Delhi at the age of 92.

== Selected works ==
Singh has authored more than a dozen books. Some of his works are:

- Kavita Ke Naye Pratiman ISBN 978-8-1267-0744-7
- Chhayavaad ISBN 978-8-1267-0736-2
- Dusari Parampara Ki khoj ISBN 978-8-1267-1591-6
- Itihaas Aur Alochana ISBN 978-8-1267-0510-8

== Awards and recognition ==
- Kendra Sahitya Akademi Award (1971) for his work Kavita Ke Naye Pratiman.
- Shalaka Samman by Hindi Academy, Delhi
- Sahitya Bhushan Samman by Uttar Pradesh Hindi Sansthan
- Kuvempu Rashtriya Puraskar by Rashtrakavi Kuvempu Prathisthana
- Bharat Bharati Samman
- D.Litt. by University of Hyderabad
