= Sarai Mohana =

- Census town
- Interactive map of Sarai Mohana
- Country: India
- State: Uttar Pradesh
- District: Varanasi
- Time zone: UTC+05:30 (IST)

Sarai Mohana is a census town in the Varanasi district of Uttar Pradesh, India. It is roughly 5 kilometres (3.1 mi) from Varanasi. The Varuna River flows into the Ganges nearby, making the area prone to flooding.

The village's inhabitants are a mixture of Hindu and Urdu speakers.
