= Varuna River =

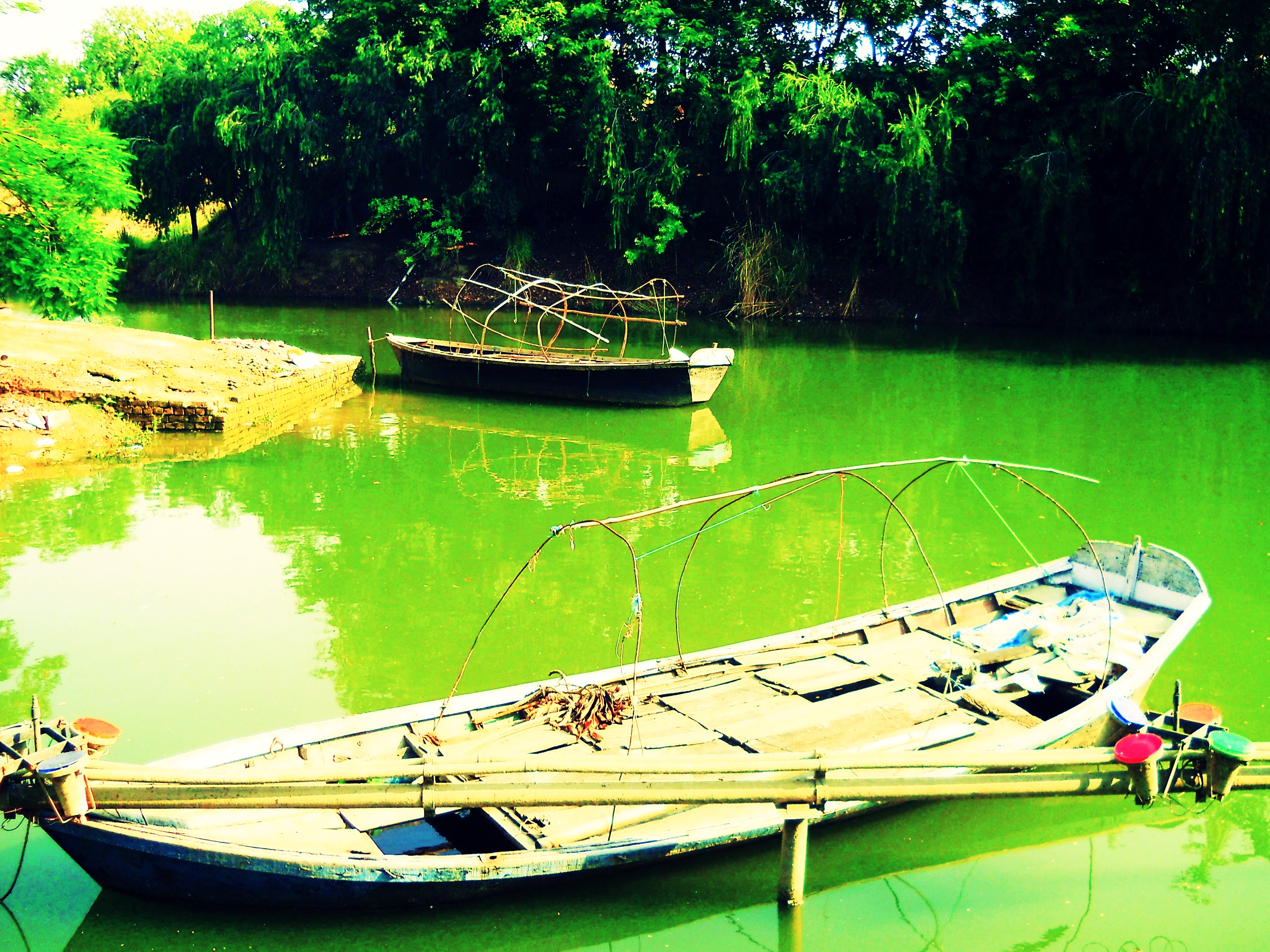

- The confluence of Varuna and Ganga in Uttar Pradesh

Location
- Country: India
- State: Uttar Pradesh

Physical characteristics
- Mouth: Ganges
  - location: Adikeshav Ghat, Sarai Mohana, Varanasi district, Uttar Pradesh
  - coordinates: 25.329°N 83.044°E
- Length: 202 km (126 mi)

The Varuna River is a minor tributary of the Ganges River in Uttar Pradesh, India. It originates at Phulpur in the Prayagraj district and merges into the Ganges near Sarai Mohana in the Varanasi district. The 6 kilometres (3.7 mi) stretch between Sarai Mohana and Sadar, Varanasi, Uttar Pradesh is prone to flooding. The name 'Varanasi' is originated from the name of two rivers, Varuna and Assi.

According to the Vamana Purana, the river was created by the gods alongside the Assi River. It is also mentioned in the Mahabharata.

Varuna derives its name from Varuna, a Hindu god who is associated with sky, oceans and water. The river originates from Melhum at Phulpur in Prayagraj district. Spanning a distance of around 100 kilometers, it flows in an east to southeast direction before merging with the Ganges at Sarai Mohana near Varanasi.

It covers a distance of twelve kilometers from the western part of Jaunpur district, near the town of Mungerabad Shahpur, and eventually joins the Ganga River in Varanasi after a journey of 202 kilometers.

In February 2023, Denmark and Uttar Pradesh government signed a Rs 1,000 crore MoU for cleaning the Ganga River and its tributary, Varuna.
