= P. K. Radhamani =

Indian translator (born 1952)

- Born: 1952 (age 73–74); Vaka, Thrissur District, Travancore–Cochin
- Education: University of Calicut
- Occupation: Translator
- Spouse: C.P. Karunan
- Children: 2
- Writing career
- Notable awards: Sahitya Akademi Translation Prize

P. K. Radhamani is an Indian translator from Kerala. She has translated several works from Hindi to Malayalam and from Malayalam to Hindi. She won the 2023 Sahitya Akademi Translation Prize for the translation of Hindi writer Amrita Pritam's autobiography Aksharon Ke Saye into Malayalam as Aksharangalute Nizhalil.

== Early life and education ==
P. K. Radhamani was born in 1952 in Vaka in present-day Thrissur district of Kerala to P. R. Sarojini and P. K. Krishnan. She studied at Malathi U. P. School, Vaka, St. Francis High School, Mattam and Little Flower College, Guruvayur. In 1971, she came to Kozhikode from Thrissur to study in the first Hindi batch of University of Calicut. She did her Ph. D. under the supervision of Dr. Malik Mohammed.

== Career ==
She was a Hindi teacher at Zamorin's Guruvayurappan College, Kozhikode from 1975 to 1987. In 1987, she joined Malabar Christian College, Kozhikode, from where she retired as the head of the Hindi Department in 2007.

Her husband Karunan died within a month of her retirement from service in 2007. She says she turned to writing and reading to overcome the loneliness created by this death.

The first published writing was a memoir written after the death of Shantha Rajagopal, an English teacher and close friend at Guruvayoorappan College. The first translation was P. Padmarajan's short novel 'Savavahananamnum Thedi'. Since then, 22 books have been published up to 2024.

Radhamani translated M. T. Vasudevan Nair's Asuravith into Hindi under the title Shaitan ki Aulaad, M. P. Veerendra Kumar's Haimavatabhoovil under the title Vadiya Bulatihai Himalaya Ki and K. P. Ramanunni's Sufi Paranja Katha under the title Kahani Sufiki Jabani.

Radhamani has translated stories from 22 Indian languages into Malayalam under the title Katha Bharatham, and also translated Ravindra Kalia's autobiography Ghalib Chuttisharab into Malayalam. The book Guru Dutt: Urakkamillathavante Katha is a translation into Malayalam of Bengali writer Bimal Mitra's memoirs about Indian filmmaker Guru Dutt. Radhamani has translated Pradip Bihari's Sahitya Akademi Award-winning collection of Maithili language short stories into Malayalam under the title Bandhangal. This book has been published by Sahitya Akademi.

In addition to her translated works, she has also written a travelogue titled Yatrakal Nattilum Marunattilum and an autobiographical work titled Ezhutum Jeevitum.

== Personal life ==
Her husband C.P. Karunan was a lecturer at Malabar Christian College where she also worked. The couple have two children. Their elder son, Nithin Karun, is a doctor at Kozhikode Medical College, and the younger son, Bipin Karun, is a businessman in Kozhikode. She currently lives near Malabar Christian College in Kozhikode.

== Awards and honors ==
For the translation of Hindi writer Amrita Pritam's autobiography Aksharon Ke Saye into Malayalam as Aksharangalute Nizhalil, Radhamani won the Sahitya Akademi Award for Translation for the year 2023.

== Selected works ==
- Jnanapeeda Puraskara Jethakkal. Thiruvananthapuram: Cultural Publications Department, Government of Kerala. 2004. ISBN 8188087181.

=== Translations ===
==== Into Malayalam ====
- Tamil Kathakal. Poorna Publications. 2022. ISBN 9788194378853.
- Maithili Kathakal. Poorna Publications. 2023. ISBN 978-8130026244.
- Maayi. Mathrubhumi Books. 26 November 2024. ISBN 9789359629018.
- Gurudutt : Urakkamillathavante Katha. Mathrubhumi Books. 30 July 2024. ISBN 9789359623801.
- Katha Bharatham. Mathrubhumi Books. 1 January 2012. ISBN 978-81-8265-413-6.
- Bandhangal. New Delhi: Sahithya Akademi. ISBN 9788126046775.

==== Into Hindi ====
- Shree narayan guru:samajik jagaran ke agradoot. New Delhi: Sastha Sahitya mandal prakashan. 2017. ISBN 978-8173099731.
- Pratinidhi Malyalam Kahaniyan. New Delhi: Sastha Sahitya mandal prakashan. 2012. ISBN 9788173096570.
- Keraleey Navajagaran Ke Agradooth. New Delhi: Sastha Sahitya mandal prakashan. 2022. ISBN 9789390872046.
- Prathinithi Malayala Kahaniyam. New Delhi: Sastha Sahitya mandal prakashan. 2012. ISBN 9788173096587.
- Shaithan Ki Aulath. New Delhi: Vani prakashan. 2009. ISBN 9788181439512.
- Vadiya Bulatihai Himalaya Ki. Pathrika Prakashan.
