= Mamta Kalia =

Indian author, teacher and poet (born 1940)

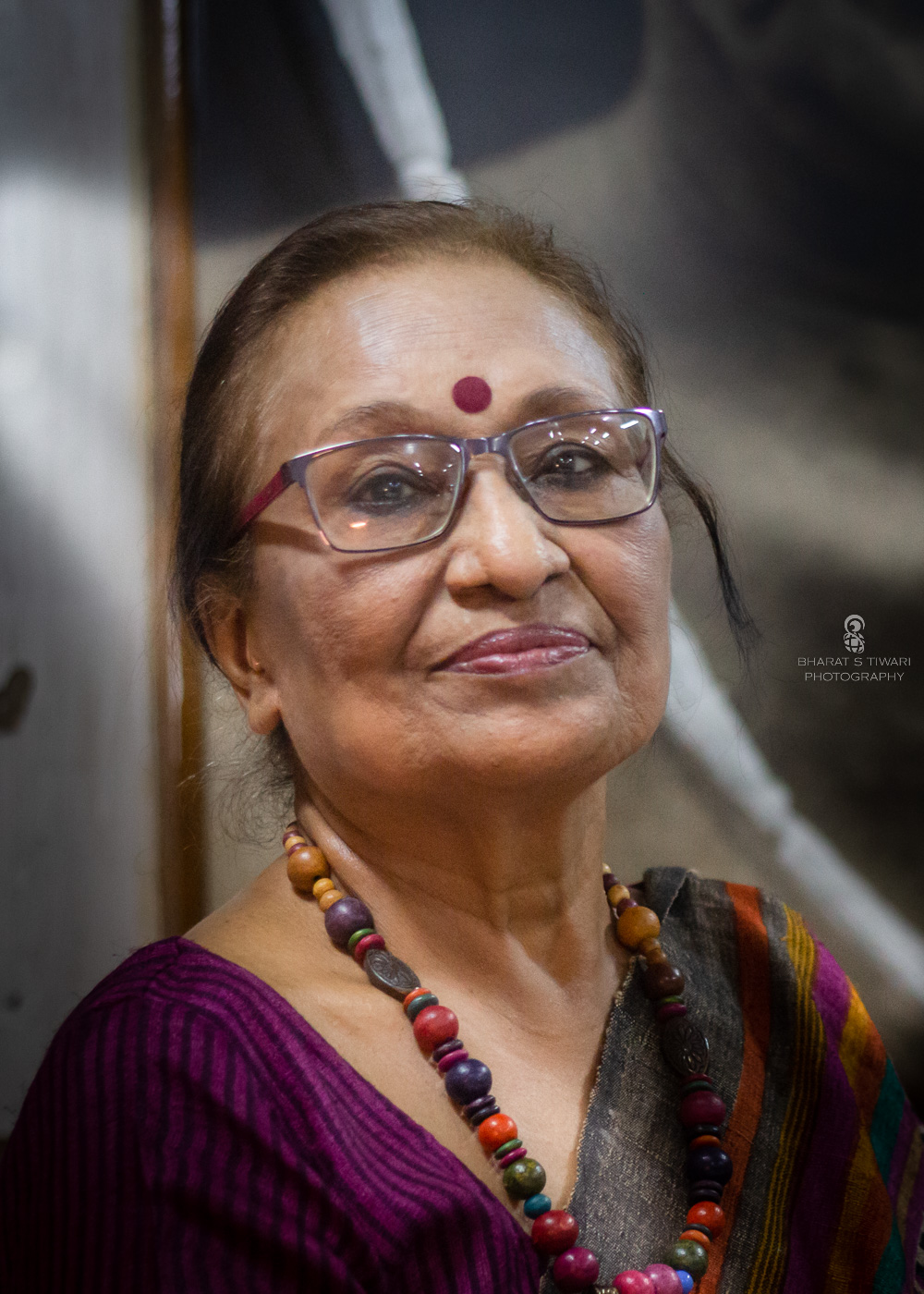
- Mamta Kalia
- Born: 1940 (age 85–86) Vrindavan, Uttar Pradesh
- Notable awards: Vyas Samman

Mamta Kalia (born 2 November 1940) is an Indian author, teacher, and poet, writing primarily in the Hindi language. She won the Vyas Samman, one of India's richest literary awards, in 2017 for her novel Dukkham Sukkham (Sadness and Happiness).

== Life ==
Kalia was born in Vrindavan, Uttar Pradesh, and studied in Delhi, earning an M.A. in English from the University of Delhi. Her father worked for All India Radio, India's national broadcaster. Kalia taught at the SNDT Women's University in Mumbai, and also at Women's Service House Degree College in Allahabad, and retired from teaching in 2001. Kalia's husband, Ravindra Kalia, was also a popular Hindi author. Following her retirement, Kalia headed the Bharatiya Bhasha Parishad, a literarary organization based in Kolkata, that publishes translations of works of literature to and from Hindi.

== Writing ==
Kalia won the Vyas Samman, one of India's richest literary awards, for her novel Dukkham Sukkham in 2017. The award was presented by Mridula Sinha, the governor of Goa, who described the novel as having "captured the essence of Indian culture. Kalia's previous novel, Beghar (Homeless) was very commercially successful, running to five editions. She has written several novels and collections of short stories, four collections of poetry, as well as two collections of plays. She is currently writing a biography of her husband, as well as a book about the history of Allahabad. Her writing engages with the lived experiences of women, often in middle-class families in India. She has also won several other literary awards, including the Yashpal Katha Samman, Sahitya Bhushan Samman, Ram Manohar Lohiya Samman, Mahadevi Varma Samman, and the Sita Award.

== Selected works ==
Poetry collections:

- खाँटी घरेलू औरत (An Entrenched Domesticated Woman)
- कितने प्रश्न करूँ (How Many Questions Do I Ask?)
- Tribute to Papa and other poems
- Poems 78

Novels:

- बेघर (Homeless)
- नरक दर नरक (Hell to Hell)
- प्रेम कहानी (A Love Story)
- लड़कियाँ (Girls)
- एक पत्नी के नोट्स (A Wife's Notes)
- दौड़ (Distance)
- अँधेरे का ताला (The Lock of Darkness)
- दुक्खम्‌ - सुक्खम् (Sadness and Happiness)

Other works:

- Plays: यहाँ रहना मना है (It is Forbidden to Live Here), आप न बदलेंगे (You Won't Change)
- Memoir: कितने शहरों में कितनी बार (How Many Times in How Many Cities)
- A translation of Somerset Maugham's work Of Human Bondage into Hindi.
