= P. K. Chandran =

Indian writer and translator

P. K. Chanran
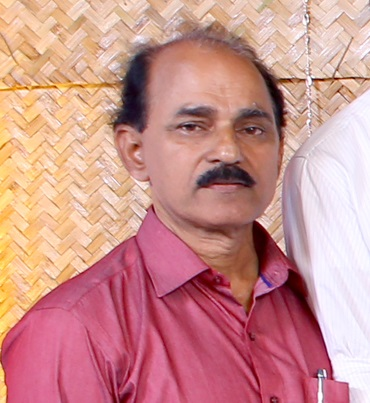
- Born: 10 May 1952 (age 72); Manipuram, Calicut, India
- Spouse: Nirmala Pathirikkat (m. 1984)
- Children: 2

P. K. Chandran (born 10 May 1952) is an Indian translator and creative writer in Malayalam and Hindi. His Karnan, a translation of Shivaji Sawant's Marathi novel Mrityunjay, won the Sahitya Akademi Translation Prize in 2001.

== Books ==
- Insulted and Humiliated Characters in Puranas (Sarthak Prakasan, New Delhi)
- Kunthiparvam (Chithra Publishers, Tvm)
- Droupati (DC Books, Kottayam)
- Gandhari (DC Books, Kottayam)
- Sita (DC Books, Kottayam)
- Kunthi (DC Books, Kottayam)
- Drona(DC Books, Kottayam)
- Sathivathy (DC Books, Kottayam)
- Bheeshma (DC Books, Kottayam)
- Yayathi (DC Books, Kottayam)
- Ravanan (DC Books, Kottayam)

== Translations ==
- Karnan (Mrityunjaya of Sivaji Sawant - DC Books Marathi)
- Yantra (Malayattoor Ramakrishnan - National Books Trust -Malayalam)
- Samakaleena Cherukathakal (National Books Trust - Malayalam)
- Yugandharan (Yugandhar of Sivaji Sawant- Kendra Sahitya Academy, New Delhi - Marathi )
- Mohammed Rafi - sangeethavum jeevithavum (Hindi)
- Njan Hinduvanu (Asghar Wajahat - Hindi)
- Saadat Hasan Mantoyude Kathakal (Saadat Hasan Manto - Urdu)
- Avarnan (Sharan Kumar Limbale -Marathi)

== Awards ==
- Sahitya Akademi Translation Prize for Karnan
