= K. C. Ajayakumar =

Malayalam-language writer

K. C. Ajayakumar is a writer and translator from Kerala, India. He has published two novels, two research books and two translations in Hindi and has translated 22 books from Hindi to Malayalam. He has received many notable awards including Sahitya Akademi Translation Prize (2015).

== Biography ==
Ajayakumar was born in Koyipram panchayat, Pathanamthitta district, Kerala to K. V. Chandran Nair and M.N. Meenakshiamma. He was the Senior Manager at Indian Overseas Bank. Later, while working as the Chief Manager of Corporation Bank, he retired from service to engage full-time writing. Currently he is living in Thiruvananthapuram.

== Literary contributions ==
=== Original works in Hindi ===
- swatantrata andolan par aadharit Hindi upanyas (Hindi essay based on freedom movement)
- Malayalam vyakaran ek parichay (book on Malayalam grammar)
- Kavikulaguru Kalidas
- Suryagayatri
- Tagore- Ek jeevani ISBN 8194738520
- Sathyavan-Savithri ISBN 8194738504

=== Translations to Hindi ===
- Valmiki Ramayan, ek adyayan
- Gitashastram - Hindi translation of Sri C. Radhakrishnan's commentary on Gitadarsanam

=== Original works in Malayalam ===
- Kalidasan (novel) - based on life of Kalidasa
- Mruthyunjayam (Novel) ISBN 9788124016718
- Rabindranath Tagore (Novel) - A novel adaptation of Rabindranath Tagore's Swargamanas. This novel was translated to English with the titile Tagore.
- Adi Shankara: Introduction to Advaita Vedanta through the life story of Adi Shankara. (ISBN 9789386560100) This book was translated to English with the title Shankaracharya.

=== Translations to Malayalam ===
- Karmayogam - Original work by Narendra Kohli based on the story of Krishna (with Dr. K. C. Sindhu) ISBN 9788130020754
- Two volumes of Abhyudaya novel by Narendra Kohli based on Ramayana (with Dr. K. C. Sindhu)
- Eight volumes of the Mahasamar novel by Narendra Kohli based on the Mahabharata
- Vivekanandam - Original work by Narendra Kohli
- Gora - Malayalam translation of Bengali novel Gora by Rabindranath Tagore
- CV Raman Pillai (Short Biography) Original work by S. Guptan Nair
- Chhatrapati Shivaji, sadbharanathinte maatruka - Original by Anil Madhav Dave
- Bharatha vikasanasam, Sadyathakal Prasnangal, Pariharangal (Book on Indian Development Possibilities, Problems and Solutions) - Original work by Sundeep Waslekar
- Ambedkar samoohika viplava yathra (book on Ambedkar's Social Revolutionary Journey) - Original work by Dattopant Thengadi
- Babasaheb Ambedkarrum saamoohya neethiyum - Original work by Ramesh Patange
- Yathodharma sthatho jaya - Original work by Narendra Kohli ISBN 9788130020518
- Sitamanasam (Malayalam translation of Mridula Sinha's novel Sita Puni Boli)
- Narendra Modi - Udachuvarkkalinte Perunthachan, Navbharata Shilpi - Original by Dr. R. Balashankar ISBN 9788130021669
- Narendramodiyute thiranjedutha prasangangal -Selected Speeches of Narendra Modi
- Manassil thottu paranjath - Translation of Narendra Modi's Mann Ki Baat speeches 2017, 2018, 2019 ISBN 9788130021805
- Raveendranatham ISBN 9788130018706

== Awards ==
- 2018: Viswahindi samman award by the Ministry of External Affairs of India for outstanding contribution to the promotion of Hindi language and literature.
- 2015: Sahitya Akademi Translation Prize for translation of Bengali novel Gora by Rabindranath Tagore
- 2002: Central Government Award for Hindi Writers from Non-Hindi Region.
