= Koilakh =

Koilakh is an old, historic village panchayat in Madhubani District, Bihar State, India. It is within the Rajnagar Vidhan Sabha constituency. The local language is Maithili. Accordinging to 2009 figures, Koilakh village is also a gram panchayat.

The total geographical area of the village is 951.88 hectares. Koilakh has a total population of 8,648 people. There are about 1,937 houses in Koilakh village. Madhubani is the nearest town to Koilakh which is about 12 km away.

== Nearby Villages of Koilakh ==
- Belhwar(Raghuni Dehat)
- Az Rakbe Mangrauni
- Magarpatti
- Pilakhwar
- Ranti
- Rampura
- Chaudhurana
- Parsa
- Rampatti
- Kaithahi
- Raghubirchak
- Nirbhapur
- Bijai
- Nahar
- Bhagwatipur Bazar
