= Ashit Desai =

- Born: 28 June 1951 (age 75); Vadodara, Gujarat, India
- Genres: playback singing, Indian classical music
- Occupations: Singer, music composer
- Instrument: Vocalist
- Years active: 1969–present

Ashit Desai (Gujarati: આશિત દેસાઈ; born 28 June 1951) is a legendary Indian composer, vocalist, musician and music director. He composes scores for films, TV serials, dance productions and dramas. He is known as Gujarati Sugam Sangeet artist.

== Early life ==
Ashit was born in 1951 to Kunjbihari and Mayuriben Desai in Baroda, Bombay State (now Vadodara, Gujarat). Initially he learned music from his parents. He graduated in Commerce and took a Diploma in vocal music from M. S. University of Baroda and migrated to Mumbai for career opportunities.

== Career ==
Ashit has composed scores for dramas, dance ballets, TV serials & films. The Sitar Maestro Pandit Ravi Shankar had enlisted him in composing music for the Asiad and placed him in charge of overall coordination of cultural events. His has won wide acclaim for the music direction in the Hindi Television serial Chanakya on Doordarshan. The devotional songs for Richard Attenborough's film Gandhi are sung by him. In 1988, he conducted Ravi Shankar orchestral compositions at the closing ceremony of the Festival of India in Moscow. In 1989, He assisted Ravi Shankar as orchestra conductor and singer in his ballet Ghanashyam. He has given music in Hindi film Viruddh... Family Comes First produced by Amitabh Bachchan.

== Awards ==
1. All India Radio's Best Singer Award in 1969 (At the Age of 18)
2. Gujarat State Award in 1976
3. Asiad Jyoti Medal by the President of India
4. "Pt. Omkarnath Thakur Award." of Gujarat State in 1989
5. 2017 - Sangeet Natak Akademi Award (Category : Music for Dance)
6. Award for Best Music Director for the Gujarati TV serial "Shraddha"

== Personal life ==
He is married to Hema Desai who is also singer. Their Son Alap Desai is also a music artist, whose album Pehchan was Nominated under the category of Best Gazal Album in Global Indian Music Academy Awards-2016.

== Discography ==
=== Music Composer ===
1. Yoga Unveiled (2004)
2. Hanuman Vandana (2007)
3. Ballet "Ganaga" (2019) starring Hema Malini.
4. Ballet "Geet Govind " (2014) starring Hema Malini.
5. Songs of Narasinh Mehta (1996), Navaras Records.
6. Jai Jai Shrinathaji (1995), Navaras Records.

=== Soundtrack ===
1. Rock Band (Video Game 2007)

=== Producer ===
1. Pehchaan (2015)
