= Kandwa =

Coordinates: 9.2167°N 1.8500°W

- census town
- Interactive map of Kandwa
- Country: India
- State: Uttar Pradesh
- District: Varanasi

Population (2001)
  - Total: 7,762

Languages
  - Official: Hindi
- Time zone: UTC+5:30 (IST)

Kandwa is a census town in Varanasi district in the Indian state of Uttar Pradesh.

== Demographics ==
At the 2001 India census, Kandwa had a population of 7,762. Males constituted 53% of the population and females 47%. Kandwa had an average literacy rate of 64%, higher than the national average of 59.5%: male literacy was 74%, and female literacy was 52%. In Kandwa, 17% of the population was under 6 years of age.

Karmdeshwer Temple is situated in Kandwa. The people of Kandwa believe that Shiv Jee's first steps in Varanasi were in Kandwa.
