= Kishor Shantabai Kale =

Marathi writer

Kishor Shantabai Kale (1970–2007) was a Marathi writer and social worker from Maharashtra, India. He was the son of a Kolhati tamasha artist. He studied at the Grant Medical College to become a medical doctor. Kale died at age 37 in a car accident on February 21, 2007. He was closely related to Madhu Kambikar an Indian film artist.

== Works ==
=== Kolhatyacha Por ===
In 1994, he wrote his autobiography Kolhatyacha Por (son of a kolhati) (कोल्ह्याट्याचा पोर) in Marathi. It has been translated to English by Sandhya Pandey and titled Against all odds. There has been a demand from the Kolhati community that the book be banned as they consider it libellous.

=== Hijara Ek Mard ===
His novel, Hijara Ek Mard [Eunuch, A Man], was also adapted for the stage. Kale acted in the lead role of a eunuch in this play, Andharyatra.
