= Kashinath Singh =

Indian writer and scholar (born 1937)

- काशीनाथ सिंह
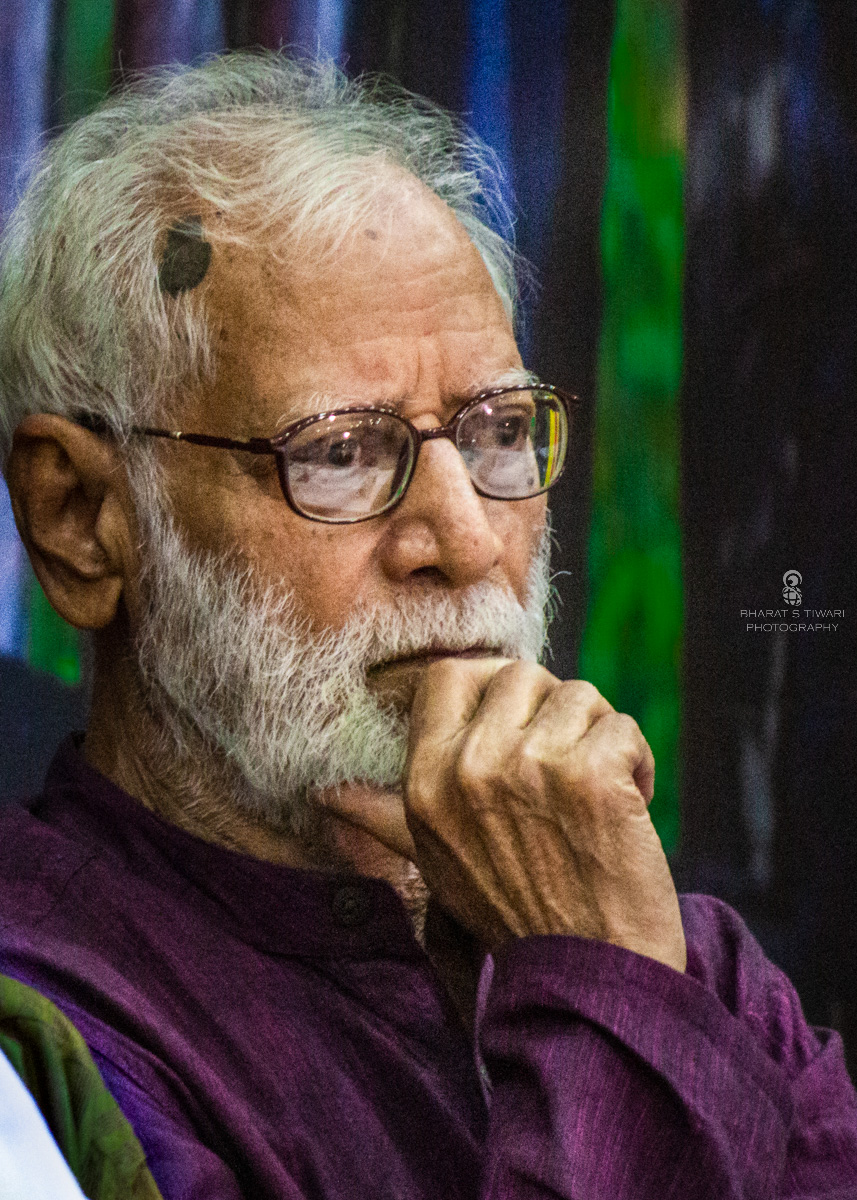
- Kashinath Singh
- Born: 1 January 1937 (age 89); Jiyanpur, Uttar Pradesh, India
- Education: Banaras Hindu University
- Occupations: Writer, novelist
- Relatives: Namvar Singh (brother)
- Writing career
- Language: Hindi
- Notable works: Kashi Ka Assi, Rehan Par Ragghu, Kahni Upkhan
- Notable awards: Sahitya Akademi Award; 2011; Sharad Joshi Samman; Sahitya Bhushan; Katha Samman; Rajbhasha Samman; Bharat Bharti Award

Kashinath Singh (Hindi: काशीनाथ सिंह, born 1937) is an Indian writer and scholar of Hindi language and known for writing novels and short stories in Hindi. He was formerly a professor of Hindi literature in Banaras Hindu University. He received the Sahitya Akademi Award in 2011 for his novel Rehan Par Ragghu, and is considered one of the best chroniclers of the city of Varanasi. He has recently received 'Bharat Bharti Award', the state's highest literary award given by U.P. government.

== Biography ==
Kashinath Singh was born in 1937 in the village of Jiyanpur, in Chandauli district of north Indian state of Uttar Pradesh in a peasant family. His early schooling was done at Jiyanpur village school. He continued his education at Banaras Hindu University from where he obtained BA, MA and PhD. He started his career as a lecturer in Banaras Hindu University in 1965 and retired from there as professor and the head of the Hindi department. Singh presently lives with his son in Varanasi in Brij Enclave on Manduadih Road. Renowned critic Dr. Namvar Singh is elder brother of Kashinath Singh. He was a friend and relative of Doodhnath Singh.

== Legacy ==
Kashi Ka Assi, published in 2008, is considered his most significant work. It is written from an insider's portrait of life on the ghats, the oddball characters and the student politicians from the 1970s. The novel is considered to be unique in its detailed portrayal of the colourful life of Varanasi.

Kashinath Singh is also known for his unique style of writing biographies of literary personalities. His memoirs are compiled into the volume Yaad Ho Ki Na Yaad Ho, which won the Sharad Joshi Award. Parts of Kashi ka Assi have been adapted to theatre by eminent director Usha Ganguly and the novel has also been adapted into a feature film, Mohalla Assi, by Chandraprakash Dwivedi.

Kashinath Singh received Sahitya Akademi Award for his novel Rehan Par Ragghu in 2011. In recent times, Kashinama, a play based on Kashi Ka Assi has been staged 125 times in India and abroad.

== Works ==
- Kashinath Singh (2004). Kashi Ka Assi. Rajkamal Prakashan. ISBN 9788126704224.
- Kashinath Singh (2011). Rehan Par Regghu. Rajkamal Prakashan. ISBN 9788126719648.
- Kashinath Singh (2007). Yaad Ho Ki Na Yaad Ho. Rajkamal Prakashan. ISBN 9788171789368.
- Kashinath Singh (2007). Apna Morcha. Rajkamal Prakashan. ISBN 9788126713868.
- Kashinath Singh (2003). Kahani Upkhan. Rajkamal Prakashan. ISBN 9788126707768.
- Kashinath Singh (2008). Pratinidhi Kahaniyan. Rajkamal Prakashan. ISBN 9788126702497.
- Kashinath Singh (2006). Ghar Ka Jogi Jogda. Rajkamal Prakashan. ISBN 8126712406.
- Kashinath Singh (2012). Mahuacharit. Rajkamal Prakashan. ISBN 9788126722297.
- Kashinath Singh (2014). Upsanhar. Rajkamal Prakashan. ISBN 978-8126726059.
- Kashinath Singh (2012). Lekhak Ki Chherchhaar. Rajkamal Prakashan. ISBN 9789383233144.
- Kashinath Singh (2012). Kavita Ki Nayi Taareekh. HarperCollins India. ISBN 9788172239572.
- Kashinath Singh (1986). Sadi Ka Sabse Bada Admee. Rajkamal Prakashan. ISBN 8171780164.

== Awards and recognitions ==
- Kendra Sahitya Akademi Award
- Sharad Joshi Samman
- Sahitya Bhushan
- Katha Samman
- Rajbhasha Samman
- Bharat Bharti Award
