= Leela Sarkar =

Singaporean-Indian Malayalam language writer

Leela Sarkar is a Singaporean-Indian Malayalam language writer from Kerala, South India. She won Sahitya Akademi Translation Prize in 1993 and Kerala Sahitya Akademi Award for Translation in 2000.

== Biography ==
Leela was born in Singapore on 17 May 1934. Her father, Dr. K.K. Menon was from Kodakara, Thrissur District, Kerala and her mother was from Thottippal, Irinjalakuda, Kerala. At the time of the Second World War, Leela's family returned to India from Singapore. After completing primary education, she graduated from St. Mary's College, Thrissur and Maharajas College, Eranakulam. She married Dipesh Sarkar from Bengal. She is now settled in Mumbai. Leela learned Bengali from the course conducted by Vanga Bhasha Prachara Samiti, Dadar. She published a Bengali - Malayalam Dictionary in 2004.

Leela translated a number of books written by Bengali writers into Malayalam. She worked in Jahangir Art Gallery for more than nine years. Later, she served as the executive in the Bombay office of C.R.Y. Charitable Society.

== Bibliography ==
- Abhayam
- Abhimanyu
- Asamayam
- Amma
- Dooradarshini
- Mahamoham
- Ichamati
- Aranyakam
- Ente Penkuttikkalam
- Jaran
- Vamshavruksham
- Fera
- Satyam, Asatyam
- Kaivarthakandam
- Ramapadachoudhari
- Bharatiya Suvarna Kadhakal - Munshi Premchand
- Aranyathinte Adhikaram
- Manasa Vasudha
- Nilaaparvatham

== Awards ==
- Vivarthaka Ratnam award from Bharat Bhavan in 2014
- Sahitya Akademi Translation Prize in 1993 for Aranyathinte Adhikaram
- Kerala Sahitya Akademi Award in 2000 for Manasa Vasudha
