= Kashi Ka Assi =

2004 Hindi novel

- Author: Kashi Nath Singh
- Language: Hindi
- Publication date: 2004
- Publication place: India

Kashi Ka Assi is a 2004 Hindi novel written by Kashi Nath Singh. A movie, Mohalla Assi was made on this novel. Kashi Ka Assi can signify to the Assi that belongs to Kashi – the city or the author. He has added real people and real conversations in this novel. The story goes through the events in 1990 and 1998 including Ram Janmabhoomi movement and Mandal Commission implementation.

The book brings alive Assi in Kashi through various characters, their curiosity and more importantly their association with each other. It reminds of the times when people used to matter more than the materialistic things and interacted with each other.
