= Ravindra Kalia =

Indian writer

- Born: 11 November 1939; Jalandhar, Punjab
- Died: 2016 (aged 76–77); Delhi
- Education: M.A. Hindi
- Occupation: Writer
- Spouse: Mamta Kalia
- Writing career
- Language: Hindi
- Subjects: Story, Novels, Memoirs

Ravindra Kalia (1939–2016) was an editor, novelist, storyteller and memoir writer in Hindi literature.

== Biography ==
Ravindra Kalia, born in Jalandhar, Panjab on November 11, 1939, has recently retired from the post of Director of the Indian Jnanpith, making him the compulsory magazine of Hindi literature as soon as he took up the responsibility of editing 'Naya Gyanodaya'. Ravindra Kalia's wife, Mamta Kalia, is also a Hindi author.

== Writing ==
Story collection

- Nine years younger wife
- Remove poverty
- Street brush
- Chakaiya Neem
- Until the age of 27
- Little light

Novel

- God is safe
- A B C D.
- 17 Ranade Road

Memoirs

- Memorandum of memories
- Comrade monalisa
- Hitchhiker of creation
- Ghalib hidden wine

Satire collections

- Why can't you sleep overnight
- Melody adulteration cons

Storybook

- Ravindra Kalia's stories
- Ten representative stories
- Twenty one best stories

== Awards ==
- U.P. Premchand Smriti Samman of Hindi Institute,
- M.P. Padumlal Bakshi Award by Sahitya Akademi, (2004)
- U.P. Sahitya Bhushan Bhushan Award by Hindi organization (2004)
- U.P. Lohia Award by Hindi Institute, (2008)
- Shiromani Literature
