= Chandraprakash Dwivedi =

Indian filmmaker (born 1960)

Dr. Chandra Prakash Dwivedi
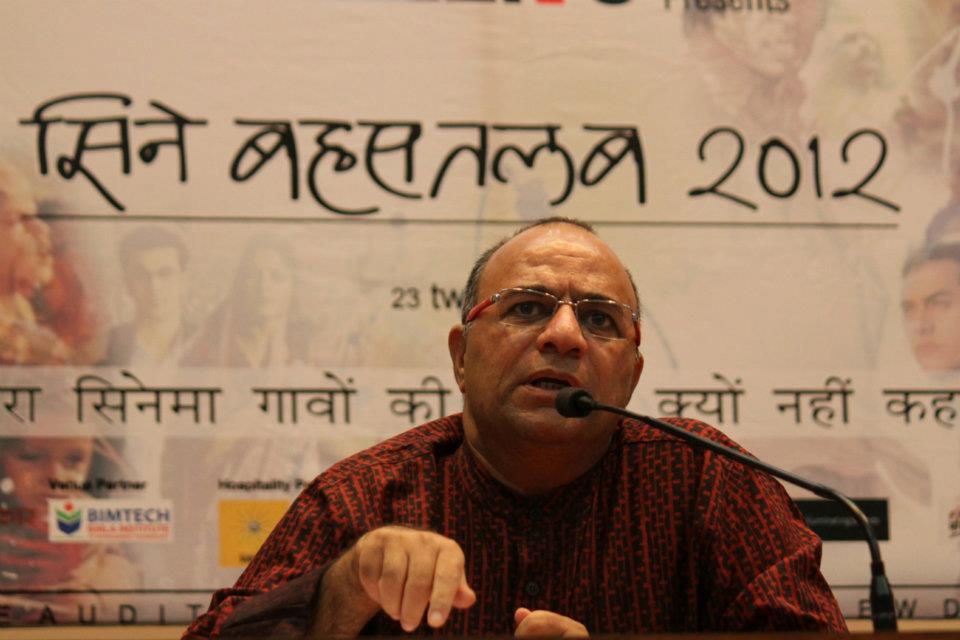
- Born: 26 February 1960 (age 66); Dodua, Sirohi, Rajasthan, India
- Occupations: Filmmaker; actor
- Years active: 1990-present
- Spouse: Mandira Dwivedi
- Children: 1
- Honours: Padma Shri (2022)

Chandraprakash Dwivedi (born 26 February 1960) is an Indian actor, film director and screenwriter, who is best known for directing the 1991 television epic Chanakya in which he also played the title role of the political strategist Chanakya and an inspiration for millions. He has also directed the 1996 television series Mrityunjay which is based on the life of Karna, one of the main characters of the epic Mahabharata, for which he won a Screen Videocon Best Director award. His other major work is the 2003 film Pinjar, a tragic love story set amidst the Hindu-Muslim tensions during the Partition of India, based on Amrita Pritam's novel of the same name. He also wrote and directed Akshay Kumar-starrer Samrat Prithviraj (2022). He was honoured by the Government of India with the Padma Shri, the fourth-highest civilian honour of the country, in 2022.

== Career ==
Dr. Dwivedi is a qualified medical professional who gave up his profession because of a deep interest in Indian literature, and began working in theatre instead. From 1990 to 1992, he wrote, directed and acted in the TV serial Chanakya, which took India by storm with its crafted dialog, mastery of Hindi and lessons on politics and philosophy. In the late 1990s, he held the position of programming division head at Zee TV. During his stint at Zee, he tried his hand at retelling the Mahabharata (Ek Aur Mahabharat) but had to abort the experiment after 14 episodes due to a poor response from advertisers and viewers. The rerun of Chanakya too failed to attract advertisers. Dwivedi wrote the dialogues for the 2001 epic Doordarshan television series on Chhatrapati Shivaji.

In February 2008, Bobby Bedi announced that he had been planning a new Mahabharata with Dwivedi as director. However, in April, Dwivedi disassociated himself from the project citing pressure brought on as a result of competition from Ekta Kapoor's Kahaani Hamaaray Mahaabhaarat Ki.

In 2008, Dr. Dwivedi directed a television serial based on the Upanishads titled Upanishad Ganga. He is said to be working on The Legend of Kunal, a film based on the life of Kunala, the son of Emperor Asoka. In 2009, the South Asian Cinema Foundation honoured Dwivedi with its Cultural Catalyst Award "in recognition of his commitment to exploring India's ancient culture and history in television and popular cinema."

In January 2011, his film Mohalla Assi, set around Assi Ghat of Varanasi and based on Dr Kashi Nath Singh's famous novel, went into production with shooting starting in Film City, Mumbai, with Sunny Deol as lead actor.

His next film was Zed Plus. This film was a political satire and comedy, starring Adil Hussain (best known for Life of Pi and English Vinglish) and Mona Singh (of Jassi Jaisi Koi Nahi fame). K K Raina, Sanjay Mishra, Kulbhushan Kharbanda play other important roles in this film.

In January 2022, he was awarded the prestigious Padma Shri award by the Government of India.

He has directed the film Prithviraj Chauhan produced by Yash Raj Films, starring Akshay Kumar in the titular lead role. The film Samrat Prithviraj was released on 3 June 2022 across India in Hindi, Tamil, and Telugu.

In 2024, he served as chairman of the feature film jury of the Panorama section at the 55th International Film Festival of India.

== Filmography ==
| Year | Title | Director | Writer | Actor | Creative Producer | Notes |
|---|---|---|---|---|---|---|
| 1991–92 | Chanakya | Yes | Yes | Yes | No | 47 Episodes |
| 1996 | Mrityunjay | Yes | Yes | No | No | 13 Episodes |
| 1997 | Ek Aur Mahabharat | Yes | Yes | No | No | 14 Episodes |
| 2003 | Pinjar | Yes | Yes | No | No | |
| 2012 | Upanishad Ganga | Yes | Yes | No | No | Voice Role; 52 Episodes |
| 2014 | Zed Plus | Yes | Yes | No | No | |
| 2018 | Mohalla Assi | Yes | Yes | No | No | |
| 2019 | Surajya Sanhita | Yes | Yes | No | No | 13 Episodes |
| 2022 | Samrat Prithviraj | Yes | Yes | No | No | |
| 2022 | Ram Setu | No | No | No | Yes | |
| 2023 | OMG 2 | No | No | No | Yes | |
