= List of Sahitya Akademi Award winners for Hindi =

List of winners of a literary honor in India

Sahitya Akademi Award for Hindi
- Award for contributions to Hindi literature
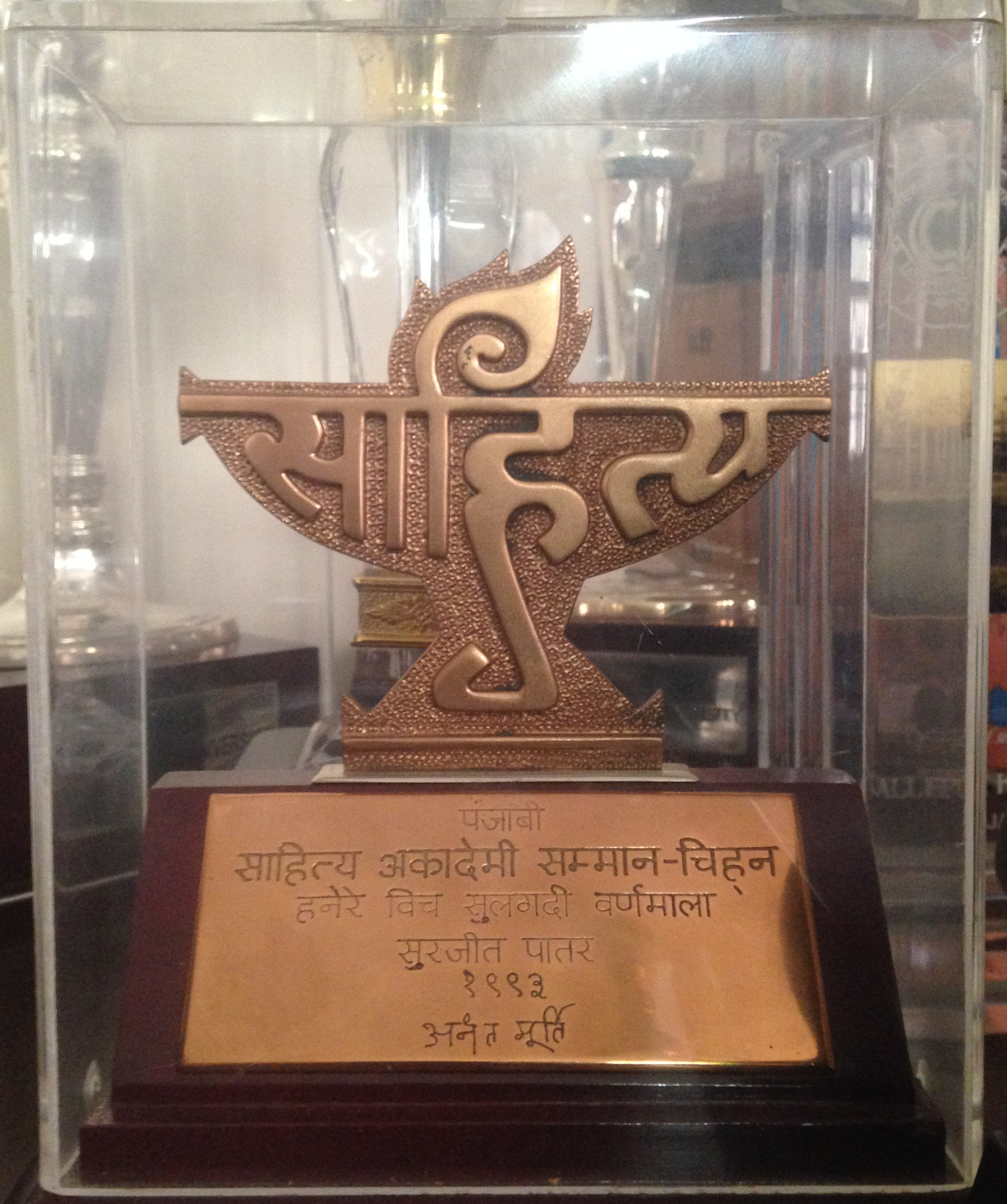
- Awarded for: Literary award in India
- Sponsored by: Sahitya Akademi, Government of India
- Reward: ₹1 lakh (US$1,100)
- First award: 1955
- Final award: 2024

Highlights
- First winner: Makhanlal Chaturvedi
- Most Recent winner: Gagan Gill
- Total awarded: 69
- Website: Official website

Part of a series on

Sahitya Akademi Awards
Category
Sahitya Akademi Award winners by language
- Assamese
- Bengali
- Bodo
- Dogri
- English
- Gujarati
- Hindi
- Kannada
- Kashmiri
- Konkani
- Maithili
- Malayalam
- Marathi
- Meitei (Manipuri)
- Nepali
- Odia
- Punjabi
- Rajasthani
- Sanskrit
- Santali
- Sindhi
- Tamil
- Telugu
- Urdu
Sahitya Akademi Translation Prizes
- Assamese
- Bengali
- Bodo
- Dogri
- English
- Gujarati
- Hindi
- Kannada
- Kashmiri
- Konkani
- Maithili
- Malayalam
- Marathi
- Meitei (Manipuri)
- Nepali
- Odia
- Punjabi
- Rajasthani
- Sanskrit
- Santali
- Sindhi
- Tamil
- Telugu
- Urdu
Sahitya Akademi Yuva Puraskar
- Assamese
- Bengali
- Bodo
- Dogri
- English
- Gujarati
- Hindi
- Kannada
- Kashmiri
- Konkani
- Maithili
- Malayalam
- Meitei (Manipuri)
- Marathi
- Nepali
- Odia
- Punjabi
- Rajasthani
- Sanskrit
- Santali
- Sindhi
- Tamil
- Telugu
- Urdu
Sahitya Akademi Bal Sahitya Puraskar
- Assamese
- Bengali
- Bodo
- Dogri
- English
- Gujarati
- Hindi
- Kannada
- Kashmiri
- Konkani
- Maithili
- Malayalam
- Meitei (Manipuri)
- Marathi
- Nepali
- Odia
- Punjabi
- Rajasthani
- Sanskrit
- Santali
- Sindhi
- Tamil
- Telugu
- Urdu
Related
- Eighth Schedule to the Constitution of India
- Official Languages Commission
- List of languages by number of native speakers in India

Sahitya Akademi Award is a literary honor given each year, since 1955, by Sahitya Akademi (India's National Academy of Letters), to writers and their works, for their outstanding contribution to the upliftment of Indian literature and Hindi literature in particular. No Award was conferred in 1962.

== Recipients ==
Year	Image	Author	Work	Type of Work	Ref.
1955		Makhanlal Chaturvedi	Him Tarangini	Poetry	
1956	—	Vasudev Sharan Agarwal	Padmavat Sanjivani Vyakhya	Commentary	
1957		Acharya Narendra Dev	Bauddha Dharma Darshan	Philosophy	
1958		Rahul Sankrityayan	Madhya Asia Ka Itihas	History	
1959		Ramdhari Singh 'Dinkar'	Sanskriti Ke Char Adhyay	A survey of Indian culture	
1960		Sumitranandan Pant	Kala aur Budha Chand	Poetry	
1961		Bhagwati Charan Verma	Bhoole Bisre Chitra	Novel	
1962	No Award				
1963	—	Amrit Rai	Premchand: Kalam Ka Sipahi	Biography	
1964	—	Agyeya	Angan Ke Par Dwar	Poetry	
1965	—	Nagendra	Rasa Siddhanta	Treatise on poetics	
1966	—	Jainendra Kumar	Muktibodh	Novelette	
1967		Amritlal Nagar	Amrit Aur Vish	Novel	
1968		Harivansh Rai Bachchan	Do Chattanen	Poetry	
1969		Shrilal Shukla	Raag Darbari	Novel	
1970	—	Ram Vilas Sharma	Nirala Ki Sahitya Sadhana	Biography	
1971		Namwar Singh	Kavita Ke Naye Pratiman	Literary criticism	
1972	—	Bhawani Prasad Mishra	Buni Huyi Rassi	Poetry	
1973		Hazari Prasad Dwivedi	Alok Parva	Essays	
1974	—	Shivmangal Singh 'Suman'	Mitti Ki Baraat	Poetry	
1975		Bhisham Sahni	Tamas	Novel	
1976		Yashpal	Meri Teri Uski Baat	Novel	
1977	—	Shamsher Bahadur Singh	Chuka Bhi Hun Nahin Main	Poetry	
1978	—	Bharat Bhushan Agarwal	Utna Vah Suraj Hai	Poetry	
1979	—	Sudama Panday 'Dhoomil'	Kal Sunana Mujhe	Poetry	
1980		Krishna Sobti	Zindaginama - Zinda Rukh	Novel	
1981	—	Trilochan Shastri	Tap Ke Taye Hue Din	Poetry	
1982	—	Harishankar Parsai	Viklang Shraddha Ka Daur	Satire	
1983	—	Sarveshwar Dayal Saxena	Khutiyon Par Tange Log	Poetry	
1984		Raghuvir Sahay	Log Bhool Gaye Hain	Poetry	
1985		Nirmal Verma	Kavve Aur Kala Pani	Short stories	
1986	—	Kedarnath Agarwal	Apurva	Poetry	
1987		Shrikant Verma	Magadh	Poetry	
1988		Naresh Mehta	Aranya	Poetry	
1989		Kedarnath Singh	Akaal Mein Saras	Poetry	
1990	—	Shiv Prasaad Singh	Neela Chand	Novel	
1991	—	Girija Kumar Mathur	Main Vaqt Ke Hun Samne	Poetry	
1992		Giriraj Kishore	Dhai Ghar	Novel	
1993	—	Vishnu Prabhakar	Ardhanarishwar	Novel	
1994		Ashok Vajpeyi	Kahin Nahin Wahin	Poetry	
1995	—	Kunwar Narayan	Koi Doosra Nahin	Poetry	
1996		Surendra Verma	Mujhe Chand Chahiye	Novel	
1997	—	Leeladhar Jagudi	Anubhav Ke Aakash Mein Chand	Poetry	
1998		Arun Kamal	Naye Ilake Mein	Poetry	
1999		Vinod Kumar Shukla	Deewar Main Ek Khirkee Rahathi Thi	Novel	
2000		Manglesh Dabral	Hum Jo Dekhte Hain	Poetry	
2001		Alka Saraogi	Kali-Katha : Via Bypass	Novel	
2002		Rajesh Joshi	Do Panktiyon Ke Beech	Poetry	
2003		Kamleshwar	Kitne Pakistan	Novel	
2004	—	Viren Dangwal	Dushchakra Mein Srista	Poetry	
2005	—	Manohar Shyam Joshi	Kyap	Novel	
2006		Gyanendrapati	Sanshyatma	Poetry	
2007	—	Amar Kant	Inhin Hathiyaron Se	Novel	
2008		Govind Mishra	Kohre Mein Kaid Rang	Novel	
2009		Kailash Vajpeyi	Hawa mein Hastakshar	Poetry	
2010		Uday Prakash	Mohan Das	Short stories	
2011		Kashinath Singh	Rehan Par Raghu	Novel	
2012	—	Chandrakant Devtale	Patthar fenk Raha Hoon	Poetry	
2013		Mridula Garg	Miljul Man	Novel	
2014	—	Ramesh Chandra Shah	Vinayak	Novel	
2015	—	Ramdarash Mishra	Aag Ki Hansi	Poetry	
2016	—	Nasira Sharma	Parijat	Novel	
2017		Ramesh Kuntal Megh	Vishw Mithak Sarit Sagar	Literary Criticism	
2018		Chitra Mudgal	Post Box No. 203 - Nala Sopara	Novel	
2019	—	Nand Kishore Acharya	Chheelatey Hue Apne Ko	Poetry	
2020		Anamika	Tokri Mein Digant 'Their Gatha	Poetry	
2021	—	Daya Prakash Sinha	Samraat Ashok	Play	
2022	—	Badri Narayan	Tumadi Ke Shabd	Poetry	
2023	—	Sanjeev	Mujhe Pahachaano	Novel	
2024	—	Gagan Gill	Main Jab Tak Aai Bahar	Poetry	
2025		Mamta Kalia	Jeete Jee Allahabad	Memoir	

== See also ==
- List of Hindi language poets
- Sahitya Akademi
