= Nalin Vilochan Sharma =

Indian Hindi writer and professor (1916–1961)

Nalin Vilochan Sarma
- Born: 18 February 1916; Patna, Bihar and Orissa Province, British India
- Died: 12 September 1961 (aged 45)
- Citizenship: Indian
- Education: Patna University, Patna
- Occupations: Writer, professor – (Hindi literature), critic
- Parent: Ram Avatar Sarma
- Writing career
- Notable works: Swarna Manjusha, Drishtikon, Sahitya ka Itihas Darshan, Maapdand (on literary criticism) etc.
- Literary movement: Nakenwad

Nalin Vilochan Sarma (18 February 1916 – 12 September 1961) was a professor of Hindi Literature in University of Patna. He started the Nakenwad movement in Hindi literature. He was the son of Ram Avatar Sharma, a Sanskrit scholar.

== Early life ==
Nalin Vilochan Sarma, or Nalin Vilochan Sarma, was born in Patna on 18 February 1916. He was the fourth child and eldest son of his father, Ramavtar Sarma. From an early age, Nalin's father taught him such Sanskrit classics as the Amarkosh, Kalidas's Meghdoot and Suryashatakam. Ramavtar Sarma always maintained that filling a child's mind with as much knowledge as possible would sustain him through his adult life and all he would have to do then would be to pick the words out as he wanted and use them when he or she liked. Ramavtar died when his son was just twelve- or thirteen-years-old, leaving his eldest sister, Indumati as his closest guardian and guide. He married Punjabi painter Kumud Sarma who survived him and had one son with her.

== Career ==
Sarma joined Patna University as a lecturer in the Hindi department – same department his father had helped build. Nalin had a critical and explorative mind and he was well versed in European literature. In Europe as well as India, Marxist poetry had swept the stage with an immensity that overwhelmed academia. In India the Chayavaad style of writing verse had dominated the scene between 1918 and 1936 when it started yielding place to Pragativaad, or progressive poetry, between 1936 and 1950. The 1950s brought with it a new trend in thinking – a search for a middle path, an equilibrium, an understanding – and into this stepped Nalin Vilochan Sarma with his Nakenwad.

Sarma was a revolutionary with a strange propensity, deeply influenced by western thought and literature. He believed that the raw material of poetry should be drawn from the immediate past, the surrounding present, not necessarily the classic era. He believed that poetry is an inner force which could be enriched in its expression through symbols around us. In 1943, Agyeya had written his Tar Saptak in which he had included seven poets including Muktibodh, Bharat Bhushan Agrawal, Prabhakar Machve, Girija Kumar Mathur. Each of these represented some new poetical style, mostly experimental. This style came to be known as Prayogvaad.

Nalin's thinking signifies a positive influence of Agyeya and his Tar Saptak. He believed that in poetry, words, music, rhythm and play of intonation mattered, and that the technique and diction of poetry mattered more than the content. This went against the established philosophy of poetics which had dominated Indian poetry, a philosophy which emphasised that content was of the greatest significance in poetry. Through Nakenvaad, (three poets had combined their work, Nalin, Kesari and Naresh, hence Naken) Nalin sought to extend his philosophy that words, if exact, rhythmic and lyrical in quality, could lend to poetry what words propped around subject could not.

He also contended that the language of poetry flowed in close proximity with prose, that poetry and prose supplemented and enriched each other. They were in no way contrary or opposed to each other. Nalin was a leader, a non-conformist. He advocated use of commonplace language like William Wordsworth did and maintained that the choice of words in Hindi literature had taken on nuances of artificiality as if finding the right words had become a labour. Thus, he maintained that the chasm between prose and poetry was likewise artificial. The trio of Nakenvaad had used syllables in staccatto arrangement—Kul-kat-ta-Pun-jab-Mail—or the Calcutta Punjab Mail. Similar arrangements appear in his book on Nakenvaad appearing in a vertical order using one syllable to a sentence. This he said lent a descriptive rhythm to the train he wrote about and made it onomatopoetical in nature.

This technique had already been tried out by E E Cummings in 1926–27 and by French poets in the 1930s, evoking great appreciation from some quarters and bitter criticism from others. But Nalin maintained that to keep Hindi literature alive and growing it was essential to incorporate the latest trends from English and French poetical experiments.

Simplicity was Nalin's forte and he retained extensively the use of Sanskrit words, traditional concepts and images from daily life. Nalin Vilochan Sarma also left his mark as a dramatist. His unique contribution was the introduction of the chamber drama. One immortal work of his is entitled Bibbo ka Bibbok. Bibbok is a word derived from Sanskrit dramatology and is a little-known form of drama while Bibbo is the heroine's name, derived from that. But it was as a short story writer that Nalin attained his literary peak. He used to say that writing a good short story was a 'krichh sadhana' or walking along the edge of a sword. The time that Nalin made a mark as a short story writer was when post-Freudian psycho-analysis had not made its mark in Hindi writing. And when Nalin introduced the physical reality in its frailest of sublime aspects it sent shock-waves round the world.

In Maapdand, he incorporated contemporary Western critical approaches from France and England, combining them with traditional styles to influence Hindi literature. He dedicated the work to his eldest sister's husband, K. D. Tewari, whom he held in high regard.

The confidence that Nalin had in his erudition was mammoth. Once, when a colleague suggested he should take the examinations for the title of Mahamahopadhyaya, he casually replied, 'But who will check my paper?' He died soon after, on 12 September 1961. (An article entitled Legend in his Lifetime by Shruti Shukla was published in The Hindustan Times, Patna Edition on 19 October 1991)

== Nakenwad ==
Among the numerous schools of poetry which sprang up in the 1950s was Nakenwad, a school deriving its nomenclature from the first letters of the names of its three pioneers – Nalin Vilochan Sarma, Kesari Kumar and Sri Naresh (Narbadeshwar Prasad Sinha), all poets of note in their own right. Apart from being a poet, Nalin Vilochan was also a brilliant critic, with a wide perspective on literary history. His critical attitude is marked by a synthesis or co-ordination of various disciplines of human knowledge – philosophy, history, art and culture, all pressed into the service of literary appraisal and analysis.

== Works ==
- Drishtikon – (Sahitya kala manovigyan sambandhi aalochna), Pustak Bhandar, Patna, 1947.
- Jagjivan Ram: A Biography, 1954.
- Naken ke Prapadya (Kesari kumar aur Naresh ke sath Prapadyavadi kavitaon ka sankalan), Motilal Banarsidass, Patna, 1956.
- Sahitya ka Itihaas Darshan, Bihar Hindi Rashtrabhasha Parishad, 1960.
- Satrah asangrahit purv choti kahaniya (Kahani sankalan), Abhigyan Prakashan, Ranchi, 1960.
- Swarna Manjusha, Motilal Banarsidass, ISBN 978-8120826410

=== Books published after death ===
- Mandand (Alochna aur anusandhan), Motilal Banarsidass, 1963.
- Hindi Upanyas: visheshtah Premchand (Itihas aur alochna), Gyanpith private limited, Patna, 1968.
- Naken −2 (Kavita sangraha), Parijat Prakashan, 1981.
- Sahitya: Tatva aur alochna (Itihas, alochna aur shodh), Anupam Prakashan, Patna, 1995.

=== Edited works ===
- Lokkatha kosh, Bihar Hindi Rashtrabhasha Parishad, 1959.
- Lok Sahitya: Aakar Sahitya Suchi, Bihar Hindi Rashtrabhasha Parishad, 1959.
- Lokgatha Parichay, Bihar Hindi Rashtrabhasha Parishad, 1959.
- Prachin hastlikhit pothion ka vivran, Bihar Hindi Rashtrabhasha Parishad, 1959.
- Sadal Mishra granthavali, Bihar Hindi Rashtrabhasha Parishad, 1960.
- Lalachdas krit Haricharit (incomplete), Sahitya(Varsh 9 Ank 3; Varsh 10 Ank 3; Varsh 11, Ank 1) aur Parishad Patrika (Varsh 1 ank 1) main prakashit.
- Goswami Tulsidas, Bihar Hindi Rashtrabhasha Parishad, 1961.

=== Co-edited works ===
- Sant Parampara aur Sahitya (Along with Ram Khelavan Rai), Patna, 1960.
- Ayodhya Prasad Khatri Smarak Granth (Along with Shivpujan Sahay)Bihar Hindi Rashtrabhasha Parishad, 1960.

=== Edited Journals ===
- Sahitya (traimasik), Shivpujan Sahay aur Nalin Vilochan Sarma (1950 ke prathamank se 1962 ke dwitiyank tak), Bihar Hindi Sahitya Sammelan, Patna.
- Drishtikon (masik), Nalin Vilochan Sarma aur Shivchandra Sarma (February 1948 prathamank se August 1961 ke ank tak), Sharda Prakashan, Patna aur Akhil Bharatiya Hindi Shodh Mandal, Patna.
- Kavita, (dvaimasik), Nalin Vilochan Sarma dwara July 1954 se August 1957 ke ank 3 tak sampadit, Bharatiya Kavya Sansad, Patna.

=== Anthology ===
- Nalin Vilochan Sarma: Sankalit Nibandh, National Book Trust, India, 2010.

== See also ==
- List of Indian writers
