= Jagdish Joshi =

Indian children's book illustrator (1937–2016)

Jagdish Joshi (1937 – 2016) was an Indian children's book illustrator. Born in 1937, he studied fine arts at the Indian College of Arts and Draftsmanship, Dum Dum, Kolkata, and later worked for the Hindustan Times and Children's Book Trust. He also illustrated several books for the National Book Trust and remained "one of most sought after" illustrators in children's literature in India through the 1990s.

In 1998, Joshi was a nominee for the Hans Christian Andersen Award, a biennial international award given by the International Board on Books for Young People in recognition of a "lasting contribution to children's literature".

== Work ==
- The Kaziranga Trail by Arup Kumar Dutta (1978)
- South Indian Legends by Maya Thomas and Alaka Shankar (Children's Book Trust, 1980)
- Barber at the Zoo by Pratibha Nath (Children's Book Trust, 1984)
- How Munia Found Gold by Jagdish Joshi (National Book Trust, 1984)
- A Voice in the Jungle by Jagdish Joshi (National Book Trust, 1986)
- Search by Arvind Krishna Mehrotra (1991)
- One Day by Jagdish Joshi (National Book Trust, 1999)
- Playing Together by Bharat Bhushan Agarwal and Bindu Agarwal (National Book Trust India, 2005)
