= Kuntal =

Kuntal may refer to:

- Kuntal Chandra (1984 – 2012) cricketer from Bangladesh
- Kuntal Joisher (born 1980) Indian mountaineer
- Ramesh Kuntal Megh (1931 – 2023) Indian writer

== See also ==
- Kuntala country
