= Maniawan =

Village in Bihar, India

- Village
- Location in Bihar, India
- Coordinates: 25.13106°N 85.49555°E
- Country: India
- State: Bihar
- District: Nalanda
- Sub-district: Silao

Area
  - Total: 3.93 km^{2} (1.52 sq mi)

Population (2011)
  - Total: 5,638
  - Density: 1,430/km^{2} (3,720/sq mi)
- Time zone: UTC+5:30 (IST)
- PIN: 803111

Maniawan is a village in Silao subdistrict of Nalanda district, Bihar. As of 2011, it has a population of 5,368, in 918 households.

== History ==
Hiranand Sastri identified Maniawan with the village of Maṇivāṭaka identified in a copper-plate grant issued at Munger by Devapala of Bengal in the early 800s. The grant identified Maṇivāṭaka as belonging to the naya (subdivision) of Ajapura (which Shastri identified with present-day Ajaipur), in the vishaya (province) of Rājagṛha (present-day Rajgir). In the grant, the revenues from Maṇivāṭaka and several other villages, along with all of their attached fields, pastures, and mango and madhuka orchards, were granted tax-exempt for the upkeep of a Buddhist monastery at Nalanda that had been founded by the king Balaputra of Srivijaya.

== Demographics ==
As of 2011, Maniawan had a population of 5,368, in 918 households. This population was 51.9% male (2,787) and 48.1% female (2,581). The 0-6 age group numbered 936 (488 male and 448 female), making up 17.4% of the total population. 1,590 residents were members of Scheduled Castes, or 29.6% of the total.

The 1961 census recorded Maniawan (then part of Patna district) as having a total population of 1,710 people (880 male and 830 female), in 253 households and 201 physical houses. The area of the village was given as 972 acres and it had a primary school at that point.

== Infrastructure ==
As of 2011, Maniawan had 1 primary school and 1 primary health sub centre. Drinking water was provided by well, hand pump, and tube well/borehole; there was at least one public toilet. The village did not have a post office or public library; there was at least some access to electricity for all purposes. Streets were made of both kachcha and pakka materials.
