= Jyotindra Jain =

Indian art and cultural historian

- Born: 5 June 1943 (age 83); Indore
- Education: University of Mumbai; University of Vienna
- Occupations: Art historian; cultural historian; museologist
- Relatives: Jyotsna Milan (sister)

Jyotindra Jain (born 5 June 1943) is an Indian art historian and cultural historian, and museologist. A scholar on folk and ritual arts of India, he was the director of the National Crafts Museum, New Delhi, member secretary and professor (cultural archives), at Indira Gandhi National Centre for the Arts (IGNCA), New Delhi, and also professor at the School of Arts and Aesthetics at Jawaharlal Nehru University, Delhi. He has published a number of books on Indian folk art, including, Ganga Devi: Tradition and Expression in Mithila Painting, Other Masters: Five Contemporary Folk and Tribal Artists of India and Kalighat Painting: Images from a Changing World.

He has been an Alexander von Humboldt Fellow, a Homi Bhabha Fellow and a visiting professor at the Center for the Study for World Religions, Harvard University, US, and was awarded the Prince Claus Awards in 1998.

== Early life and education ==
Jain was born in Indore. His older sister is poet Jyotsna Milan. He did his B.A. from the University of Bombay (now known as University of Mumbai), in 1963, followed by an M. A. in Ancient Indian Culture in 1965, also from the university. Next he received an Austrian Government Post-Graduate Scholarship (1970–1972); this helped him do a Certificate in museology from the University of Vienna in 1972, which led to a Ph.D. in Anthropology, in 1972, and ethnographic field research in Gujarat, Rajasthan, Madhya Pradesh, Maharashtra and Orissa.

== Career ==
Starting in 1975 and till 1978, he conducted field work in Gujarat to set up a Museum of Folk Art for the Shreyas Foundation. Later, as an Alexander von Humboldt Fellow at Heidelberg University (1972–1979), he taught for one year at the South Asia Institute at the university.

In 1984, he became the director of the National Crafts Museum, New Delhi.

In 1986 and 1989, he received fellowships from the Asian Cultural Council which allowed him to visit museums, observe the arts culture, and meet with museum specialists in the United States.

Over the years, he has published a number of books including, Ganga Devi: Tradition and Expression in Mithila Painting (1996); Other Masters: Five Contemporary Folk and Tribal Artists of India (1998); Picture Showmen: Insights into the Narrative Tradition in Indian Art (1998); Kalighat Painting: Images from a Changing World (1999); Indian Popular Culture: ‘The Conquest of the World as Picture (2004), and India’s popular Culture. Iconic spaces and fluid images (2007).

A member-secretary of IGNCA, Delhi, he curated a retrospective exhibition of photographs by Lala Deen Dayal at IGNCA, in 2010.

== Works ==
- Jaina iconography: Objects of meditation and the Pantheon, Volume 2. with Eberhard Fischer. BRILL, 1978. ISBN 90-04-05259-3.
- Painted myths of creation: art and ritual of an Indian tribe. Lalit Kala Akademi, 1984.
- Handwoven fabrics of India, Jasleen Dhamija, Jyotindra Jain. Mapin Pub., 1989
- Ganga Devi: tradition and expression in Mithila painting. Mapin in association with the Mithila Museum, 1997. ISBN 0-944142-33-8.
- Picture showmen: insights into the narrative tradition in Indian art. Marg Publications for National Centre for the Performing Arts, 1998. ISBN

8185026394.

- Other masters: five contemporary folk and tribal artists of India. Crafts Museum and the Handicrafts and Handlooms Exports Corporation of India, 1998.
- Kalighat painting: images from a changing world. Mapin Pub., 1999. ISBN 1-890206-17-2.
- Indian popular culture, "the conquest of the world as picture". Ajeepay Press, 2004. ISBN 81-88896-01-2.
- India's popular culture: iconic spaces and fluid images. Marg Publications, 2008. ISBN 81-85026-81-5.
