= Ram Avatar Sharma =

Indian scholar, academic, indologist, thinker (1877–1929)

Ram Avatar Sarma
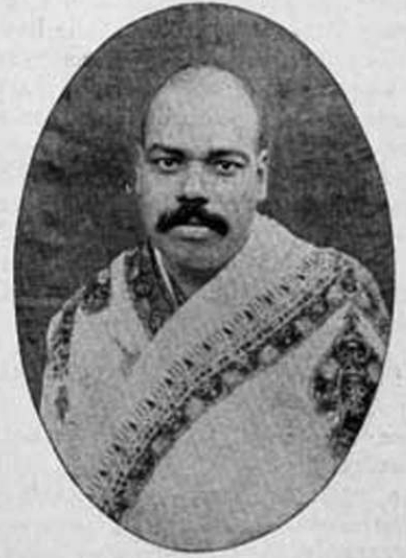
- Born: 1877; India
- Died: 1929 (aged 51–52)
- Occupations: Sanskrit scholar; academic; indologist; historian
- Children: Nalin Vilochan Sarma

Ram Avatar Sarma (1877–1929) was an Indian Sanskrit scholar and academic, apart from being an indologist and historian. A professor of Sanskrit in University of Patna in pre-independence years. He was also a renowned Indologist. Rajendra Prasad, the first President of India and a student of Sarma, was instrumental in getting his works published after his death. His son, Nalin Vilochan Sharma was also a professor of Hindi Literature in University of Patna and started the Nai Kavita; New Poetry movement in Hindi literature.

== Early life and education ==
Ramavatara Sarma was a son of Sanskrit guru, Dev Narayan Pandey, and was born on 6 March in Chhapra which lies on the northern bank of the river Ganges in the state of Bihar. His father asked him to join him in his work when he was 12 so young Ramavatara headed for India's greatest seat of Sanskrit learning, Varanasi, and became a disciple of Gangadhar Shastri, the most famous guru of the day.

He passed the Kavyateerth examination at the age of 15 and wrote his first book the same year, Dheernaishadham. He took admission to Queen's College in Benaras which was patronised by Annie Besant and completed his Sahityacharya the same year, topping the list. But one of the professors at Queen's College, Vennis, happened to comment that were he to acquire some knowledge of English he would fare better.

At this Ramavtar Sarma went right off to pawn his only prized possession, his lota and borrow a copy of the Encyclopædia Britannica which he read through once. After that all his life he was able to tell which word appeared on which page, in which column, after which word and before which. This was the time he changed his name from Pandey to Sarma which roughly means 'the knowledgeable one'.

== Career ==
Mahamahopadhyaya Pt. Ramavtar Sarma had a career as a student of Sanskrit in which he earned the oriental degrees of Kavyatirtha, Vyakarnacharya, Sahityacharya, etc., having received his education under the guidance of his father at an early stage and later under the tutorship of the Mahamahopadhyaya Gangadhar Shastri of Queen's College, Benares. He also had his education in modern subjects in English and passed all his examinations from entrance up to M.A., .

== Personal life ==
He was survived by five daughters and three sons. His eldest daughter, Indumati, was herself a great scholar of Sanskrit. His eldest son, Nalin Vilochan Sarma, was a writer and poet and founded a new style of poetry, Nakenwaad. His collection of short stories, Vish ke Daant is still taught in Patna University and he too died early while he was the Head of the Hindi Department of Patna University. He also had a daughter Mandirmani who was one of the surviving twins he had who married a pilot.

== Legacy ==
India's first president, Rajendra Prasad, was one of Ramavtar's favourite students. It was he who was instrumental in getting several of Sarma's books into print.

An article on Ramavtar Sarma entitled 'India's Greatest Forgotten Genius' by Shruti Shukla first appeared in The Hindustan Times, Patna Edition, dated 5 September 1986.

== List of works ==
=== Sanskrit and Pali ===
- Vividh gadya-padyatmak rachnayen 1903–06; published in monthly journals Mitragoshthi and Suktisudha from Kashi
- Saduktikarnamrit, based on ancient archival material for Asiatic Society of Bengal, period 1903–10.
- Priyadarshiprashastyah, translated only Pali into Sanskrit and English for University of Calcutta, 1910.
- Parmarthdarshan, sutrabadh darshan-granth – vartik sahit; published in Kashi in the years 1911–12 and 13. Bhashya's first chapter published in Sanskrit journal Sanskrit-Sanjivan in 1943.
- Vangamaymahanav, shlokbaddh Sanskrit vishwakosh; published between 1911–25; Gyanmandal Limited, Varanasi.
- Mudgardutam; vyangya-kavya; vyakriti of Kalidasa's Meghadūta; published in Sharda patrika.
- Bharatiyamitivrittam, History of India in Sanskrit.

=== English ===
- Philosophy of the Puranas (Purandarshan); 1902, got Buch Metaphysics Prize for it, unpublished.
- Chapters from Indian Psychology (Bharatiya manovigyan ke kuch adhyaya), 1904, got Buch Metaphysics Prize for it, unpublished.
- Gopal Basu Mallick lectures on Vedantism (Vedanta par vyakhyan), 1908, published by University of Calcutta.
- A Thesis on the Age of Kalidasa (Kalidasa ke samay ka nirupan); 1909, Published by Hindustan Review.
- Elementary Textbook of Eternal Law (Parmarthdarshan ki angrezi bhumika); 1911, unpublished.

=== Hindi ===
- Europiya Darshan; 1905, published by Kashi Nagari Pracharini Sabha.
- Hindi Bhasha Tatva; published as lecture series, published by Kashi Nagari Pracharini Sabha.
- Hindi Vyakaran; 1907, published in monthly journal Devnagar from Calcutta.
- Hindi Vyakaran aur rachna ki shikshan-paddhati, 1910, published by education department of Bengal.
- Vividh-vishayak Nibandh; 1912–13, published in Saraswati, Sudha and Madhuri.
- Mudgaranandcharit; publication year unknown, published in Nagari Pracharini Patrika.
- Padyamaya Mahabharata, publication year unknown.

== See also ==
- List of Indian writers
