= Arun Kamal =

Hindi Poet & Critic

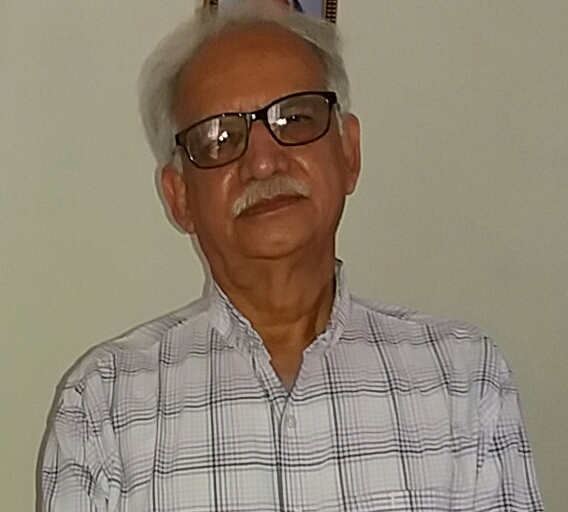
- Born: 15 February 1954 (age 71)
- Notable awards: Sahitya Akademi Award

Arun Kamal is an Indian poet in modern Hindi literature with a progressive, ideological poetic style. Apart from poetry, Kamal has also written criticism and has done translations in Hindi. He was awarded the Sahitya Akademi Award for Hindi in 1998.

Arun Kamal's real name is Arun Kumar. For literary writing, he adopted the name Arun Kamal. He was born on 15 February 1954 at Nasriganj in Bihar. He has been a professor in the English Department of Patna University. He lives in Patna.
