= Dinaman =

- Categories: News magazine
- Frequency: Weekly
- Publisher: Bennett, Coleman & Co. Ltd.
- Founded: 1965
- Country: India
- Based in: New Delhi
- Language: Hindi
- ISSN: 0012-3005

Dinaman was a Hindi language weekly magazine founded in 1965. It was published in New Delhi. The newsweekly was started by Sachchidananda Hirananda Vatsyayan 'Ajneya', a pioneer of modern Hindi poetry and writing. His Assistant Editors were Raghuvir Sahay, a prominent Hindi author and a then unknown Manohar Shyam Joshi, who went on to become the editor of Saptahik Hindustan and a pathbreaking writer himself. Subsequent editors of the magazine included the Hindi poet Raghuvir Sahay, K.L. Nandan, and Satish Jha. Dinaman was published by Bennett, Coleman & Co. Ltd. (now The Times Group). Some of its staff members achieved national political stature. Shrikant Verma, a poet, was nominated to India's parliamentary Upper House in 1976, the Rajya Sabha and was a close adviser of the then Prime Minister of India, Indira Gandhi. Poet Sarveshwar Dayal Saxena and critic Vinod Bharadwaj, Prayag Shukl and Uday Pratap went on achieve India's high literary honours the Sahitya Academy Puruskar, equivalent of the US Pulitzer Prize.

The magazine was considered a trendsetter in Hindi journalism. It also played a significant role in the development of the genre of Hindi theatre criticism.
