= Chandrakant Devtale =

Indian poet (1936–2017)

- Born: 7 November 1936; Gondwana, India
- Died: 14 August 2017 (aged 80)

Chandrakant Devtale (1936—2017; Hindi pronunciation: [t͡ʃən̪d̪ɾəkãːt̪ d̪eːʋt̪aːleː]) was an Indian poet, and a recipient of the Sahitya Akademi Award.

== Biography ==
Chandrakant Devtale was born on November 6, 1936, in the Gondwana region of India. During his childhood, his family migrated to the Indore State. He completed his higher education in Indore, and received his doctorate from the Sagar University.

Devtale mostly wrote poems in both Hindi and Marathi. He has been referred to as one of the most political Hindi poets. In his review of the poem, "दीवारों पर खून से" ('On walls with blood'), Kuldeep Kumar referred Devtale as a "genuine writer, under the enormous, multi-faceted pressures of new society." In a 2016 event, speaking about poetry, Devtale said: "My roots are in villages and the anxiety in me belongs to the tribals." He has received various awards, including the Makhan Lal Chaturvedi Award, Sahitya Akademi Award, and Kusumagraja National Award. Devtale's works include:

- "हड्डियों में छिपा ज्वर" ('The fever hidden in bones')
- "भूखंड तप रहा है" ('The Earth heats up')
- "रोशनी के मैदान की तरफ़" ('Towards the Flatland of Light')
- "आग हर चीज़ में बताई गई थी" ('Fire Was Said to Dwell in Everything')

Devtale died on August 14, 2017.
