= Shekhar: Ek Jivani =

Novel by Sachchidananda Vatsyayan 'Agyeya'

- Cover page of English translation; 2018 edition
- Author: Agyeya
- Original title: शेखर: एक जीवनी
- Translator: Snehal Shingavi; Vasudha Dalmia
- Language: Hindi
- Genre: Psychoanalytic novel
- Publication date: Part 1: 1940; Part 2: 1944
- Publication place: India
- English publication date: 2018
- OCLC: 19111769

Shekhar: Ek Jivani (pronounced [ʃe.khər: ek jiv.ni]; transl. Shekhar: A Life) is an unfinished Hindi-language novel by Indian writer Sachchidananda Vatsyayan, also known by his pen-name, Agyeya. Published in two parts, with a third part that has yet to see the light of day, Ek Jivani is semi-biographical in nature and is considered to be Agyeya's magnum opus.

Reviewers have remarked on the novel's subtle uses of psychoanalytic themes in its narrative of a variety of experiences. Indeed, it is recognized as being the first Hindi novel to have deployed Freudian approaches to the workings of the mind.

== Background ==
Agyeya started writing Shekhar: Ek Jivani when he was imprisoned for his rebellious activities against the British colonial government, in particular, for his participation in the attempt to help Bhagat Singh, a leader of the Hindustan Socialist Republican Army, to escape from jail in 1929.

Agyeya wrote the first draft of the novel after being arrested, where he contemplated writing about his life before he would be executed. The first part was published after four redrafts, and the second was released in 1944. The third part, which Agyeya said he had written, never appeared.

== Structure ==
The first volume is titled utthān (rising), the second saṃgharṣ (struggle). Both volumes are further subdivided into four parts (khaṇḍ in Hindi). Seven of these eight parts are headed by two general terms connected by conjunction 'and', which, according to Angelika Malinar, might indicate opposition as well as affinity. The four parts of the first volume are entitled: uṣā aur īśvar (dawn and god), bīj aur aṅkur (seed and sprout), prakṛti aur puruṣ (nature and man) and puruṣ aur paristhiti (man and circumstance). The first three parts of the second volume are entitled puruṣ aur paristhiti (man and circumstance), bandhan aur jijñāsā (confinement and curiosity) and śaśi aur śekhar (Shashi and Shekhar). Only the first preliminary chapter praveś (entry) and the last part of the second volume entitled dhāge, rassiyāṃ, guñjhar (threads, ropes, knots) departs from thus scheme.

The first chapter praveś provides an introduction to the narrative by delineating the intention of Shekhar's Biography. Shekhar is imprisoned and waits for the execution of the death sentence. In this life-and-death situation, Shekhar asks a questions whether the situation has any meaning. This search for significance draws him into the past. The actual biographical narrative unfolds chronologically in the next chapter with the description of Shekhar's birth, his childhood and youth as well as his time at the college in Madras and his social activities for the sake of the untouchables. This is, roughly, the content of the first part of the novel. The second part describes his life as a student, his association with the more militant opposition, and his affection for Shashi. This second part ends with Shashi's death and Shekhar's participation in terrorist activities.

== Contents ==
Shekhar: Ek Jivani is written in the first person, with the narrator telling their story in a nonlinear narrative. The narrator is a revolutionary who has been sentenced to death. Shortly before his execution, he reflects on his life. He recounts his memories of social rebellion and passionate love.

The narrator was born in a ruined Buddhist monastery to Brahmin parents. His father, moved from town to town in India, taking his family with him. Because of this, the narrator failed to form an attachment to any location. Furthermore, conflicting personalities of his parents split his personality. Therefore, he grew up as an introverted young man. Intelligent, yet oversensitive, he reacted violently to events he disagreed with, contemplating on his mother's actions. He then developed a deep dislike for his mother, while admiring his father and adoring his elder sister. The narrator also developed an antagonistic attitude to religion, and a rebellious view of social distinction and political slavery.

As a young child, the narrator was often violent, attacking postmen and classmates, and defied orders from adults. The narrator recalls having been badly frightened by a stuffed tiger in a museum, when his father brought home a similar fake tiger and discovered that it was filled with straw. Thus, he became convinced that all fears were imaginary. As he grew to lack fear for even death, he would bathe in the river despite his inability to swim.

From an early age, the narrator rejected social norms which he disapproved of, including the caste system. From childhood, he demonstrated an intense dislike of slavery. At college, he abandoned the Brahmin hostel in favour of the Harijan hostel as a sign of rejection of strict interpretations of Brahmanism. He was also anti-English, and would set fire to foreign clothing and refuse to speak English. He grew to be an active Indian National Congress party volunteer and eventually, he became a revolutionary.

Shekhar always harboured strong yet frustrated romantic feelings. After some early and earnest romantic experiences with a girl called Sharda, he fell deeply in love with a young woman called Shashi. After being deserted by her husband, Shashi came to live with Shekhar, but died shortly after. Shekhar felt that he was haunted by her memory.

== Plot ==
The novel starts dramatically, the very first word being phāṁsī the Hindi term for execution. Shekhar the protagonist of the eponymous novel, reflects back on his life as he is awaiting his own execution. Rather than writing a social realist narrative, the author uses a stream of consciousness technique, using vivid flashbacks, that privileges the way reality is experienced in Shekhar's mind, as he casts his thoughts back, on the eve of his death at the hands of the British authorities, to revisit in his imagination key episodes in his life.

We learn that he was born in Patna, the son of an archaeologist, and spent part of his early life in Kashmir where he encounters, and suffers an early disappointment with, a westernised girl, Miss Pratibha Lal. During his formative years of education he evinces a rebellious temperament. When the family moves back south to Ootacamund in the Nilgiri Hills, he falls in love with Sharada whose family break their association by abruptly moving away. He then befriends a girl, Shanti, who is afflicted by tuberculosis. After her death his family send him to Madras, where he lives in a Brahmin hostel. He is disgusted by Brahmin, obsessions with caste, especially when his only acquaintance there, Kumar, exploits their friendship to get money from him. He tries to set up a school for children in the slums, forms a debating society, and travels all over the south, almost drowning at Mahabalipuram.

In the second volume, to round off his education he enrolls in a college in Lahore, where he is appalled, not by caste, but by the corrupt manners of Indians mimicking Western ways, especially in the figure of an Oxford trained woman teacher Manika. There he reestablishes contact with Shashi, a girl he met when he was a child. He enlists as a voluntary officer in a camp organized by the Congress Party. The camp has been successfully infiltrated by informers and he is arrested on false charges and serves ten months in prison. There he makes friends with Madansingh, Ramaji and Mohasin, who exercise a deep influence on his thinking. While imprisoned, he also learns that Shashi, who occasionally visits, has been betrothed in an arranged marriage.

Once he regains his freedom, he dedicates himself to writing revolutionary tracts without success. Everywhere he turns, friends only cultivate his company to get him to marry one of their Brahmin daughters. He tells the married Shashi that he is tempted by suicide, and she stays platonically overnight with him to ensure he does not kill himself. On learning of this, her husband gives her a severe beating and kicks her out of his house. She goes to live with Shekar, though the relationship never develops into a sexual one. They move to Delhi where he pursues his revolutionary interests. One cell entrusts him with arms they intend to use to get a comrade out of prison. Shortly afterwards, Shashi dies of the effects of the thrashing her former husband handed out, and Shekar ends up in gaol.

== Analysis ==
Shekhar: Ek Jivani is told through the thoughts of a political prisoner recalling his life. Agyeya writes in the introduction that he "strove to give voice to a man’s passionate quest" by the examination of the past. In terms of genre, its distinctiveness lay in the way it melded autobiographical elements from the author's life with imaginative fictions.

The author adopted a style emphasizing how the narrator felt inwardly and disagreement with feelings such as his family, human relationships, women, and the manner of teaching. In personal terms, there is a focus on the protagonist's feelings with three basic instincts — sex, fear and the pursuit of self interest: Ways that affected his upbringing. While respecting his father, the protagonist finds himself hindered by her mother, causing him to resent her and grow closer to his sister. In adolescence, he falls in love with a distant cousin, which helps him grasp the meaning and value of life. He reflects on the conflict between his desire to achieve personal freedom and his social pressures which inhibit its attainment. These conflicts are played out against broader social activities, like his interest in helping the class of untouchables.

With this backdrop explored, the author, in part two, describes the gradual disillusionment which creeps over the narrator as he meets various political figures and engages in programmes of social reform. In prison, to the contrary his faith in man is strengthened by the people he encounters there. His lover, however, decides upon a conventional marriage, and, on his release from imprisonment, the narrator strives to fulfill the calling of being a writer. As his disappointment mounts up, he is tempted to commit suicide, his lover convinces him otherwise. Their love develops profoundly only to be cut short by her death, which concluded part two.

== Influences ==
Agyeya acknowledged inspiration from Romain Rolland's Jean-Christophe, the French novel in ten volumes. He wrote that "like the author of Jean-Christophe, [he] was concerned with etching the portrait of a self-analytical, introspective soul, and was interested in discovering how such a person became a terrorist."

Agyeya also quoted or mentioned Romantic and lyrical poets like Dante Gabriel Rossetti, Christina Rossetti, Edna Vincent Millay, Alfred Tennyson, William Wordsworth, Percy Bysshe Shelley, George Byron, John Keats, and Walter Scott. In the preface of the novel, Agyeya has referenced T. S. Eliot and Luigi Pirandello and literary formulations of other modernist Western writers like James Joyce, D. H. Lawrence, Marcel Proust, Henry James, Lionel Trilling, Dorothy Richardson, and André Gide.

== Reception ==
Shekhar: Ek Jivani is considered a unique and landmark novel in Hindi literature. The experimental nature of the novel gave it attention, and many critics recognized it as the first psychoanalytical novel of Hindi literature due to its focus on thematising the gap between the external world and internal states. Encyclopedia of Indian Literature mentions that the novel indicates a new beginning in Hindi literature.

In 2018, Snehal Shingavi and Vasudha Dalmia translated the novel into English as Shekhar: A Life.
