= Jyotsna Milan =

Indian writer (1941–2014)

- Born: 19 July 1941; Mumbai, India
- Died: 4 May 2014 (aged 72); Bhopal, India
- Education: University of Bombay (MA); Awadhesh Pratap Singh University (MA)
- Occupations: Novelist; short story writer; poet; editor
- Spouse: Ramesh Chandra Shah
- Relatives: Jyotindra Jain (brother)
- Writing career
- Language: Gujarati; Hindi

Jyotsna Milan (19 July 1941 – 4 May 2014) was an Indian novelist, short story writer, poet and editor. She published two novels, several short story collections and two collections of poetry, and wrote in both Gujarati and Hindi.

== Life and career ==
Milan was born in Mumbai (then Bombay) on 19 July 1941, and was of Gujarati heritage. She began writing poetry in childhood, encouraged by her father who was also a writer. Her siblings include art historian Jyotindra Jain. She held a Master of Arts degree in Gujarati literature from the University of Bombay and a Master of Arts in English literature from Awadhesh Pratap Singh University.

For at least sixteen years Milan was the editor of Anasuya, a journal published by the Self Employed Women's Association (SEWA). She translated a number of Gujarati language poems into Hindi, including works by Priyakant Maniyar, Suresh Joshi and Niranjan Bhagat, and has translated works by Ela Bhatt. She was awarded the Muktibodh Fellowship by the Government of Madhya Pradesh in 1985 and a Senior Fellowship by the Ministry of Human Resource Development in 1993.

Milan was part of a new generation of woman poets in India who emerged in the 1980s. Her poem "Woman 2" was included in The Oxford Anthology of Modern Indian Poetry (1994), translated from Hindi, and in In Their Own Voice: The Penguin Anthology of Contemporary Indian Women Poets (1993) together with her poem "Wind-tree". In 1982 a short story collection was published in English as Khandahar and Other Stories.

While Milan did not consider herself a feminist poet, scholar Lucy Rosenstein observes that "woman's experience is unmistakably the prism of her creativity". The title of Milan's 1989 poetry collection Ghar Nahin translates to "Not a Home" in English, and Rosenstein notes that many of the poems in this collection relate to the theme of the confinement or imprisonment of women within the home.

Milan was married to the writer Ramesh Chandra Shah, and their daughter Rajula Shah is a filmmaker. She died in Bhopal on 4 May 2014.

== Selected works ==
- Apne Saath (novel, 1976)
- Cheekh Ke Aar Paar (short story collection, 1979)
- Kandahar Tatha Anya Kahaniyan, also published in English as Khandahar and Other Stories (short story collection, 1982)
- Ghar Nahin (poetry collection, 1989)
- A Astu Ka (novel, 1990)
- Andhere Mein Intajar (poetry collection, 1996)
- Jyotsna Milan ki Lokpriya Kahaniyan (short story collection, 2019)

== Bibliography ==
- Dharwadker, Vinay; Ramanujan, A. K., eds. (1994). The Oxford Anthology of Modern Indian Poetry. Oxford University Press. ISBN 9780195628654.
