= Angan Ke Par Dwar =

1961 Hindi poetry collection by Agyeya

- Author: Sachchidananda Vatsyayan 'Agyeya'
- Original title: आँगन के पार द्वार
- Language: Hindi
- Publication date: 1961
- Publication place: India
- Awards: Sahitya Akademi Award (1964)
- OCLC: 21026458

Angan Ke Par Dwar (pronounced [ã.gən ke par dwa.rə]; transl. Door Beyond the Courtyard) is a 1961 poetry collection by Sachchidananda Vatsyayan, generally known by his pen-name, Agyeya. The book received the Sahitya Akademi Award in 1964.

== Content ==
The poems of the book were written during the period 1959 to 1961.

The poems of the book is divided into three parts; Antah Salila, Chakrant Shila and Asadhya Vina (The Unmastered Lute). Antah Salila contains 18 poems. Chakrant Shila has 27 poems, majorly written with neo-mystical theme. The last part, Asadhya Vina, contains a long poem by the same title.

Agyeya heavily used Tadbhava words (words adopted from Sanskrit), avoiding Tatsama words (words borrowed from Sanskrit with modified phonology). Angan Ke Par Dwar played decisive role in bringing to the light the creative possibilities of the Tadbhava vocabulary.

== Reception ==
Angan Ke Par Dwar received the Sahitya Akademi Award in 1964. It was translated into Gujarati by Bholabhai Patel as Anganani Par Dwar (2002). The critic Nand Kishore Acharya calls Asadhya Vina a 'culmination' of Agyeya's poetics and philosophy of life.
