= Trishanku (book) =

1945 book by Sachchidananda Vatsyayan 'Agyeya'

- Author: Sachchidananda Vatsyayan
- Original title: त्रिशंकु
- Language: Hindi
- Subject: Indian and Western poetics
- Genre: Reflective essays
- Publication date: 1945
- Publication place: British India

Trishanku (Hindi pronunciation: [triʃəŋkũ]) is a 1945 collection of reflective essays in Hindi language by the Indian writer Sachchidananda Vatsyayan (pen name Agyeya), that mostly deals with the concept of Indian and Western poetics.

== Background ==
Trishanku was Agyeya's first collection of essays that had been published in various literary journals at different times. It contains 16 essay. It was reprinted in 1973 by Soorya Prakashan Mandir.

== Contents ==
Agyeya belongs to Psychoanalytic school of literary criticism.

Influenced by the theories of Sigmund Freud, Alfred Adler and T. S. Eliot, the volume has seven essays on theoretical and general subjects: "Sanskriti aur Paristhiti", "Kala Ka Swabhav aur Uddeshya", "Rudhi aur Maulikata" ("Tradition and Originali"), "Puran aur Sanskriti", "Paristhiti aur Sahityakar", "Sankrantikal Ki Kuchh Samasyayen" and "Chetana Ka Sansar". The volume has an appendix in six parts, which contains practical criticism of medieval and modern Hindi writings: "Keshav Ki Kavitai", "Char Natak", "Ek Bhoomika", "Do Phool", "Adhunik Kavi Mahadevi Verma" and "Vagartha Pratipattaye".

Agyeya described "Rudhi aur Maulikata" as a free translation of Eliot's "Tradition and the Individual Talent".

== Reception ==
Due to Agyeya's treatment of subject and the freshness of his expression, Trishanku is considered a milestone in the development of Hindi critical writings.
