= Bharat Bhushan Agarwal =

Indian writer (1919–1975)

- Born: 3 August 1919; Mathura, India
- Died: 23 June 1975 (aged 56)
- Occupation: litterateur, Poet, Critic
- Writing career
- Notable works: Utna wahh Suraj Hai; Chhavi Ke Bandhan; MuktiMarg; Ek Utha Hua hath
- Notable awards: Sahitya Akademi Awarded in 1978

Bharat Bhushan Agarwal (born 3 August 1919 – 23 June 1975) was a Hindi litterateur and poet who has been honored by Sahitya Akademi in 1978 for their poem Utna Vah Suraj Hai. He was also an important poet of Tar Saptak edited by Agyeya.

== Biography ==
Bharat Bhushan Agrawal was born on 3 August 1919 in Mathura and died on 23 June 1975. He completed higher education in Agra and Delhi, then worked in Akashvani and served in many literary institutions. Away from ancestral business, he considered writing literature as his work. After the publication of his first collection of poetry 'Chavi Ke Bandhan' (1941), he went to Calcutta as the editor of 'Samaj Sevak', the mouthpiece of Marwari society. It was here that he was introduced to Bengali literature and culture. Bharat Bhushan joined as an important poet in 'Tar Saptak' (1943) and became famous for his poems and oratories. While writing his other works 'Jagte Raho' (1942), 'Muktimarg' (1947), he was also associated with the magazine 'Pratik' published from Allahabad and in 1948 became Program Officer in All India Radio. In 1959, he published a collection 'O unprepared mind', which was a demonstration of his creative maturity and ideological maturity.

Bharat Bhushan Agarwal Award is an award in the field of Hindi literature which was started from the year 1975 and it is given to new poets in the memory of Bharat Bhushan Agarwal.

== Major works ==
Bharat Bhushan Agarwal's important major works are included here -:

- Utna Vah Suraj Hai (That's the sun) -Sahitya Akademi Award for Poetry Collection.
- Chhavi Ke Bandhan (Image binding)
- Jagte Raho (Stay awake)
- Oo prastut man (Present Mind)
- Anuupsthit log (Absent People)
- MuktiMarg (liberation Road)
- Ek Utha Hua hath (a raised hand)
- Ahinsa (non-violence)
- Chalte Chalte (while going)
- Parineeti (culmination)
- Prashn Chinh (Question Mark)
- Phoota Prabhat (burst morning)
- Bharatatva
- Milan
- Bida Bela (farewell time)
- Videha
- Samaj Lekh (tombstone)
- Mahabharat Ki Ek Saanjh (evening)

== Deputy Secretary of Sahitya Akademi ==
Dr. Bharatbhushan Agrawal became the Deputy Secretary of the Sahitya Akademi in 1960 and contributed to the publication of the Akademi and its programs at the national level. In 1975, he became a visiting fellow of the Institute of Ushtar Studies, Shimla and till his death continued to do research on the topic 'Partition of the Country in Indian Literature'.

His works, which seem to be quite different from those of their contemporaries, remain as important and relevant today as they are due to their satiric intensity. Dr Agrawal's works across different genres are noteworthy: A Lot of Rest, Absent People, Paper Flowers, Incidental, and the Poet's Vision. His works have been published in four volumes.
