= Trilochan Shastri =

Indian poet, writer, and scholar

- Born: Vasudev Singh; August 20, 1917; Sultanpur district, Uttar Pradesh, India
- Died: December 9, 2007 (aged 90); Ghaziabad, India
- Occupations: Poet; writer; scholar
- Writing career
- Subject: Hindi literature
- Notable work: Tap Ke Taaye Hue Din
- Notable awards: Sahitya Akademi Award (1982); Shalaka Samman (1989–90)

Trilochan Shastri (20 August 1917 – 9 December 2007) was an Indian poet, writer, and scholar who made contributions to Hindi literature. Known for his evocative poetry and insightful prose, Shastri was a prominent figure in the progressive literary movement in India. His works often reflected social realities, human emotions, and the complexities of rural and urban life. He received several awards, including the Sahitya Akademi Award and the Shalaka Samman, for his contributions to Hindi literature.

== Early life and education ==
Trilochan Shastri, born Vasudev Singh, was born on 20 August 1917 in Chirani Patti village, Sultanpur district, Uttar Pradesh, India. Growing up in a rural setting, he was deeply influenced by the simplicity and struggles of village life, which later became a recurring theme in his literary works.

He pursued his education in Sanskrit, Hindi, and Indian philosophy, which shaped his intellectual and poetic sensibilities.

== Literary career ==
Shastri emerged as a leading voice in the progressive literary movement in Hindi literature during the mid-20th century.

His poetry is characterised by its lyrical quality, emotional depth, and social consciousness. He was associated with the Pragativadi (Progressive) and Prayogvadi (Experimental) schools of Hindi poetry, blending traditional forms with modern themes.

Shastri’s notable works include his poetry collections such as Dharti Ke Geet, Gulab Aur Kaante, and Tap Ke Taaye Hue Din. His collection Tap Ke Taaye Hue Din (1982) earned him the Sahitya Akademi Award in 1982. His poems often explored themes of social inequality, human resilience, and the beauty of everyday life.

In addition to poetry, Shastri wrote essays, short stories, and critical works, contributing to the broader landscape of Hindi literature.

== Awards and recognition ==
• Sahitya Akademi Award (1982) for Tap Ke Taaye Hue Din.

• Shalaka Samman (1989–90) by the Hindi Academy, recognising his contributions to Hindi literature.

• Honorific titles such as Shastri and Sahitya Ratna, conferred in acknowledgment of his literary and scholarly achievements.

== Death and legacy ==
Shastri lived a life dedicated to literature and social engagement. His works continue to inspire poets, writers, and readers for their simplicity, emotional depth, and social relevance.

Shastri spent his final days in Haridwar, Uttarakhand, and died on December 9, 2007, after a long battle with diabetes, high blood pressure, and a tumor. He died at his residence in Vaishali, Ghaziabad, leaving behind a rich legacy in Hindi literature.

He is considered as an important figure of Hindi Sonnet. His poetry remains an integral part of Hindi literary studies, and his contributions are celebrated for bridging traditional and modern sensibilities.

== Selected works ==
• Dharti Ke Geet

• Gulab Aur Kaante

• Tap Ke Taaye Hue Din (1982)

• Various essays and short stories
