= Hiranand Sastri =

Indian archaeologist (1878–1946)

- Born: 1878; Punjab Province, British India
- Died: 4 August 1946 (aged 67–68); Gurdaspur
- Occupation: Archaeologist
- Children: Sachchidananda Vatsyayan 'Agyeya'

'Hiranand' Sastri (1878–1946) was an Indian archaeologist, epigraphist and official of the Archaeological Survey of India who was involved in the excavation of numerous sites including Nalanda and Sankissa. His son, Sachchidananda Vatsyayan 'Agyeya', Nityanand hiranand vatsyayan and Ramananda Shastri was a Hindi language poet and writer.

== Early life ==
Sastri was born in 1878 in Punjab. He graduated from the D.A.V. College, Lahore, winning a Gold Medal in the BA examination in the Sanskrit and English subjects. He obtained an MA from the Oriental College, Lahore (under Punjab University), and again won a Gold Medal.

== Career ==
Sastri started his career as a professor of Sanskrit and Philosophy at D.A.V. College, and later, he became a reader in Sanskrit at the Punjab University, teaching Sanskrit and Comparative Philology. He passed the Honours Examination in Sanskrit and received the Master of Oriental Learning (MOL).

He joined the Archaeological Survey of India (ASI) in 1903 and was appointed as an assistant archaeologist surveyor in the Northern Circle. Soon after, he was deputed by John Marshall, the then director general of ASI, to survey some archaeological sites in the Ganga-Yamuna doab, where he found some copper hoard objects. He explored and surveyed sites in Uttar Pradesh and Himachal Pradesh including Rajpur Parasu, Bithoor, Parihar, Kullu, Mandi and Suket. He was the first person to have noticed the Brahmi inscriptions at Shalri, which were later studied by J. Ph. Vogel and Dineshchandra Sircar.

He was promoted to the rank of Assistant Archaeologist, Librarian and Curator of the Nagpur Government Museum in 1906. He was sent to Harappa in 1909.

On 16 September 1925, he was appointed the government epigraphist for India. He held the post till 10 October 1933. He edited some volumes of Epigraphia Indica, the official publication of the ASI.

== Death ==
He died on 4 August 1946 in Gurdaspur.

== Recognition ==
The Punjab University awarded him the Doctor of Literature for his work Bhasa and the Authorship of the Thirteen Trivandrum Plays. The Baroda State awarded him the title of Jñānaratna.

== Selected works ==
- Nālandā and Its Epigraphic Material, 1942, Issue 66 of the Memoirs of the Archaeological Survey of India
- A guide to Elephanta, 1934, Kanak Publications
- The Ruins Of Dabhoi Or Darbhavati In Baroda State, 1940, Gaekwads Archaeological Series
- Sastri, Hiranand (1998). The Baghela Dynasty of Rewah. New Delhi: Archaeological Survey of India. OCLC 85167561.
