= Tar Saptak =

1943 anthology of Hindi language poems compiled by Agyeya

Tar Saptak or Taar Saptak (pronounced [tar səp.tək]; transl. High Octave) is an anthology of Hindi language poems written by seven poets, published in 1943. Compiled by Sachchidananda Vatsyayan (under his penname 'Agyeya'), it contain poems of Gajanan Madhav Muktibodh, Nemi Chandra Jain, Bharat Bhushan Agarwal, Prabhakar Machwe, Girija Kumar Mathur, Ram Vilas Sharma, and Agyeya himself. The publication of Tar Saptak has been seen as 'historically significant' event, as it influenced later development of modern Hindi poetry.

== Content ==
Indian music, both vocal and instrumental normally has three registers (saptak). The term Tar Saptak refers to the highest range of the three, and specifically means the 'upper or high octave' or 'high octave'. The volume with this title marked the advent of 'experimentalism' (prayogvad) in Hindi poetry.

The poets of Tar Saptak in many ways were different from each other, yet they shared a common impulse to explore new possibilities in the form and content of poetry. As Agyeya wrote, 'The poet of Tar Saptak consider poetry a subject of experiment. They do not claim to have explored the truth of poetry or to have reached the ultimate destination - they are only explorers of new ways.

Agyeya was fascinated by the sub-conscious mind and the way it revealed itself through symbols that often proved to be wholly new. He felt that in order to express the 'emotional experience' one had to be experimental. Girija Kumar Mathur experimented with words and their sounds, particularly vowels. His description of images is reminiscent of Rimbaud's idea of different vowels having different colours. Mathur emphasized language, colour and imagery in the communication of rasa. Muktibodh sought to delve into the individual mind and creates new patterns of verse in novel rhyme schemes. Bharat Bhushan Agrawal and Ram Vilas Sharma approached their themes under the influence of Marxist ideology. Prabhakar Machwe and Nemi Chandra Jain were both clearly indebted to Freudian theory.

== Reception ==
The publication of Tar Saptak gave rise to the Prayogvad (Experimentalism) in Hindi poetry, and later grow into another movement known as Nayī Kavitā (New Poetry).

Tar Saptak was followed up with a sequel of two anthologies: Dusara Saptak (Second Septet; 1951) and Tisara Saptak (Third Septet; 1959). In 1979, Agyeya published Chautha Saptak (Fourth Septet), but unlike its predecessors, it left no mark on the development of Hindi poetry, according to Lucy Rosenstein.

== Sources ==
- Rosenstein, Lucy (2004). New Poetry in Hindi: Nayi Kavita, An Anthology. Anthem Press. ISBN 978-1-843-31125-6.
- Bali, T. N. (2005) [1988]. "Experimental Literature". In Datta, Amaresh (ed.). Encyclopedia of Indian Literature. Vol. 2. Sahitya Akademi. pp. 1247–1248. ISBN 978-8-126-01194-0.
