= Ramesh Chandra Shah =

Indian poet

- Born: 1937 (age 88–89); Almora, Uttarakhand, India
- Occupation: writer
- Spouse: Jyotsna Milan
- Awards: Padma Shri; Sahitya Academy Award

Ramesh Chandra Shah is an Indian poet, novelist, critic and the author of Sahitya Academy Award winning novel, Vinayak. He was honoured by the Government of India in 2004 with Padma Shri, the fourth highest Indian civilian award.

== Biography ==
Ramesh Chandra Shah was born on 1937 in the hilly village of Almora in the Indian state of Uttarakhand in family with moderate financial means and educational background. He graduated from Allahabad University and secured his masters (MA) in English literature from the same university in 1960. He obtained a doctoral degree (PhD) on the thesis, Yeats and Eliot: Perspectives on India, from Agra University. He began teaching in the high school at Barechhina (Uttaranchal) and later taught in remote colleges in the small towns of Sidhi and Panna in Madhya Pradesh before moving to Bhopal. He retired as HOD English Literature from Hamidia college in 1997. after which he chaired Nirala Srijnanpith, a literary chair instituted by Bharat Bhavan till 2000.

Shah is credited with several books composed of poems, short stories, travelogue, essays and novels. His first novel, Gobar Ganesh, based on the lives of middle-class families in Almora, came out in 2004. Vinayak, a 2011 work which is considered by many as an extension of his first novel, fetched him the Sahitya Academy Award in 2014. Years earlier, the Government of India honoured him with the civilian award of Padma Shri.

Shah survives his wife, Jyotsna Milan, a Mumbai born writer who died in 2014. He lives in Bhopal.

== Books and publications ==
Novels

- Gobarganesh
- Kissa Gulam
- Poorvapar
- Aakhiri Din
- Punarvaas
- Aap Kahin Nahin Rehte Vibhooti Babu
- Vinayak

Short story anthologies

- Jungle Mein Aag
- Muhalle Mein Ravan
- Maanpatr
- Theater
- Pratinidhi Kahaniyan
- Katha Sanatan

Poems

- Kachue Ki Peeth Par
- Harishchandra Aao
- Nadi Bhaagti Aayi
- Pyaare Muchkund Ko
- Dekhte Hain Shabd Bhi Apna Samay
- Chaak Par Samay
- Bahuvacana

Essays

- Rachna Ke Badle
- Shaitaan Ke Bahaane
- Aadmi Ka Peda
- Padhte Padhte
- Svadharm Aur Kaalgati
- Hindi Ki Duniya Mein
- Ancestral Voices

Plays

- Maara Jaai Khusro
- Matiyaburj

Others

- Ek Lambi Chaanh (travelogue)
- Mere Sakshaatkaar (interviews)

== See also ==
- Bharat Bhavan
