= Arup Kumar Dutta =

Indian writer and journalist (born 1946)

- Born: 1946 (age 79–80); Johart, Assam India
- Education: University of Delhi, Lawrence School Sanawar
- Occupations: Writer, Journalist
- Awards: Shankar's Award, Journalist Welfare Foundation
- Honours: Padma Shri

Arup Kumar Dutta is an Indian writer and journalist from Guwahati, Assam. He has written 18 books for adults and 17 adventure novels for young people. In 2014 he was awarded the Life Time Achievement Honour by the Association of Writers and illustrators for Children, New Delhi, the Indian chapter of the International Board of Books for Young People. He has also won awards including the Shankar's Award in 1979, conferred to mark The International Year of the Child. He has been awarded the civilian award Padma Shri by Government of India in 2018.

== Early life and education ==
Arup Kumar Dutta was born on 2 July 1946 to Girish and Indira Dutta. He spent his early life in Jorhat, in the tea-growing Indian state of Assam. At the age of 8, he was admitted to The Lawrence School, Sanawar in Himachal Pradesh, from where he passed his Senior Cambridge Examination in 1962. After school, Dutta joined Ramjas College under the University of Delhi from where he completed his bachelor of arts in English Literature in 1966. He went on to finish his post-graduation in English Literature from the University of Delhi in 1969. Dutta then returned to Assam to teach English at Jagannath Barooah College, Jorhat. Along with teaching, he also started his journalistic career writing freelance satirical columns and short stories for numerous Indian magazines and newspapers. In the course of a few years, he established himself as a journalist of repute at the national level. His writings featured in journals such as The Illustrated Weekly of India, The Caravan, Femina, JS, Eve's Weekly etc. He was a writer in the famous Indian satirical magazine, Shankar's Weekly.

== Works ==
=== Books for adults ===
Dutta has so far authored 18 books for adults, 13 of which are non-fiction while three are fiction. His non-fiction books are based on a diverse range of subjects like The Brahmaputra published in 2001 by the National Book Trust; Cha Garam: The Tea Story revised and reprinted in 2013 by Orchid Publications; Unicornis: The Great Indian Rhinoceros published in 2001 by Konark; and The Roving Ministrel a biography on musician, singer and filmmaker Bhupen Hazarika, published by Rupa Publications in 2002.

Anagarika's Swansong published in 2009 is a fictional novel by Dutta. Anagarika's Swansong is a satiric takeoff on the novel genre. This anti-novel debunks all the conventional elements that a novelist would otherwise employ, including a linear narrative, structural integrity, naturalistic characterization, emotional or situational conflict et al.

Anagarika in Sanskrit is one who renounces society and materialism in search of truth. In the book, the author alludes to Prince Siddhartha who gave up his princely life to seek out in search of existential truths and to transform into Gautama Buddha, the enlightened one. The protagonist of The Anagarika's Swansong, is nameless and undertakes a journey similar to that of Prince Siddhartha in the modern age to find the meaning of existence. However, because of his inferior intellect and he lives in Kali Yuga or "the era of untruth", he first lands up in a local lunatic asylum, but finally stumbles into "poor man's enlightenment"!

The Ahoms published in 2016 is a historical fiction the delineates setting up of the Ahom Dynasty that ruled a large piece of Northeast India including all of present-day Assam. In 1228 A.D. an event occurred in the northeastern region of India, which not only changed the destiny of the Brahmaputra Valley and the surrounding mountains but also of South East Asia. A group of Shan or Tai warriors, led by a brave leader named Sukapha, having left its original home in the Shan country in Myanmar, entered Upper Assam and set up the nucleus of what was later to become the powerful Ahom Empire. From the time Sukapha entered this region till it was annexed by the British in 1826, for nearly six centuries, his descendants reigned over a greater part of the Brahmaputra valley. Few dynasties in the world, let alone Asia, had enjoyed such a long period of almost unbroken rule. It was primarily due to the Ahom dynasty that the pre-colonial Assamese nation was born. Its reign witnessed the synthesis of the disparate tribes inhabiting the Brahmaputra Valley and the evolution of a distinct Assamese language, culture and nationalist identity. The Ahom Dynasty was one of the greatest political entities in medieval Asia, equal if not greater than the more well-known counterparts in China or Japan. Its history is replete with tales of war, bravery, brutality, love, loyalty, treachery and treason. This book, The Ahoms, seeks to imaginatively acquaint readers with the saga of this fascinating dynasty and provide a glimpse of the major events during its six hundred-year rule.

Red Camellia Green published in 2016 is Mr Dutta's second fictional novel. Henry David Esscombe, a pioneer tea planter, comes to Assam in the latter half of the 1850s and opens out the Dhanboa Tea Garden. However, the unhealthy Assam environment takes its toll and, gravely ill, he summons his son David to take over the plantation. His daughter, Cordelia, desperate to see her dear papa again, accompanies her brother to Assam. As the brother-sister duo struggle to adapt to the changed circumstances, a host of individuals, including the phlegmatic Michael Bailin, the devilishly charming Christopher James Buckingham, the self-confessed anarchist Reverend Garry Swanson, the Assamese nobleman Gokuldeva Barua, the defiant conscripted tea workers Bircha and Meghu and a host of others, intrude into their lives. Against a backdrop of tea plantation life in the 1860s and the barbarous conditions whereby migrant workers were lured and enslaved, a chain of events unfold in this epical novel, leading to an unexpected, explosive climax which turns red the green leaves of Camellia.

Short Stories and Satires from Salad Days was published in the year 2021. This book is a compilation of the author's writings from his early days. It includes short stories and satires that were published in India's leading magazines of the 1970s and 1980s including The Illustrated Weekly of India, Shankar's Weekly, Caravan, JS, Femina and Eve's Weekly. The book also includes examples of his pioneering satiric column entitled Columnus Venomous, which he wrote under the pen name Scorpion.

=== Books for young people ===
Arup Kumar Dutta is one of the best-known Indian writers for young people. The Illustrated Weekly of India called him 'India's own (Enid) Blyton'. He has written 17 such novels. During the 1980s, when children in India had only access to western adventure novels, Dutta was credited to creating a new genre of gripping fiction set in India.

== Kaziranga Trail ==
In 1978, Dutta's first work of young adult fiction, a conservation-oriented novel titled The Kaziranga Trail, won the first prize in an international competition conducted by Children's Book Trust, New Delhi. Acclaimed as one of the classics in Indian children's literature, at par with Anita Desai's The Village by the Sea and Ruskin Bond's Adventures of Rusty, this book not only proved to be an all-time bestseller but also won for the author the prestigious Shankar's Award in 1979, conferred to mark the International Year of the Child. It was made into a feature film, titled Rhino, by the Children's Film Society of India. The Kaziranga Trail has been translated into a number of Indian languages. The foreign language translations include German, Japanese, Russian, Hungarian and Czech. It has been made into Braille in Japan. It is one of the three Indian entries in the New York Publication 1001 Children's Books You Must Read Before You Grow Up edited by Julia Eccleshare. The Kaziranga Trail is featured in the "Literature of the World Series" brought out by the Japanese newspaper Asahi Shimbun on 2 October 2001, along with books of Satyajit Ray and Ruskin Bond.

== The Blind Witness ==
This book published by the Children's Book Trust in 1983 is another award-winning thriller. The Blind Witness was made into a Hindi feature film titled Netraheen Sakshi by the Children's Film Society of India. Among the languages, it has been translated to are Russian and Japanese, while it has been converted to Braille for blind readers in Japan.

== Books by the author (fiction) ==
- Kaziranga Trail (1978)
- Trouble at Kolongijan (1982)
- The Blind Witness (1983)
- A Story about Tea (1985)
- The Lure of Zangrila (1986)
- Revenge (1986)
- Smack (1990)
- Save the Pool (1990)
- Oh Dear (1997)
- The Crystal Cave (1997)
- Footprints in the Sand (1999)
- The Counterfeit Treasure (2001)
- Adventure Stories Golden Set (2003)
- The Boy Who Became King (2004)
- The Anagarika's Swansong (2009)
- Adventure Omnibus (2014)
- Adventures in Kaziranga

== Books by the author (non-fiction) ==
- Unicornis (1991)
- Cha Garam, The Tea Story (1991)
- The Pipeline Saga (2022)
- Gauhati High Court--- History and Heritage (2018)
- Nature Quiz Book (1991)
- The Khongiya Barua's of Thengal (1994)
- Hammer Blow (1996)
- Indian Railways, The Final Frontier (2002)
- The Roving Minstrel (2002)
- Jyoti Prasad, Prince of Beauty (2004)
- The Jamun tree
- Pothorughat (2010)

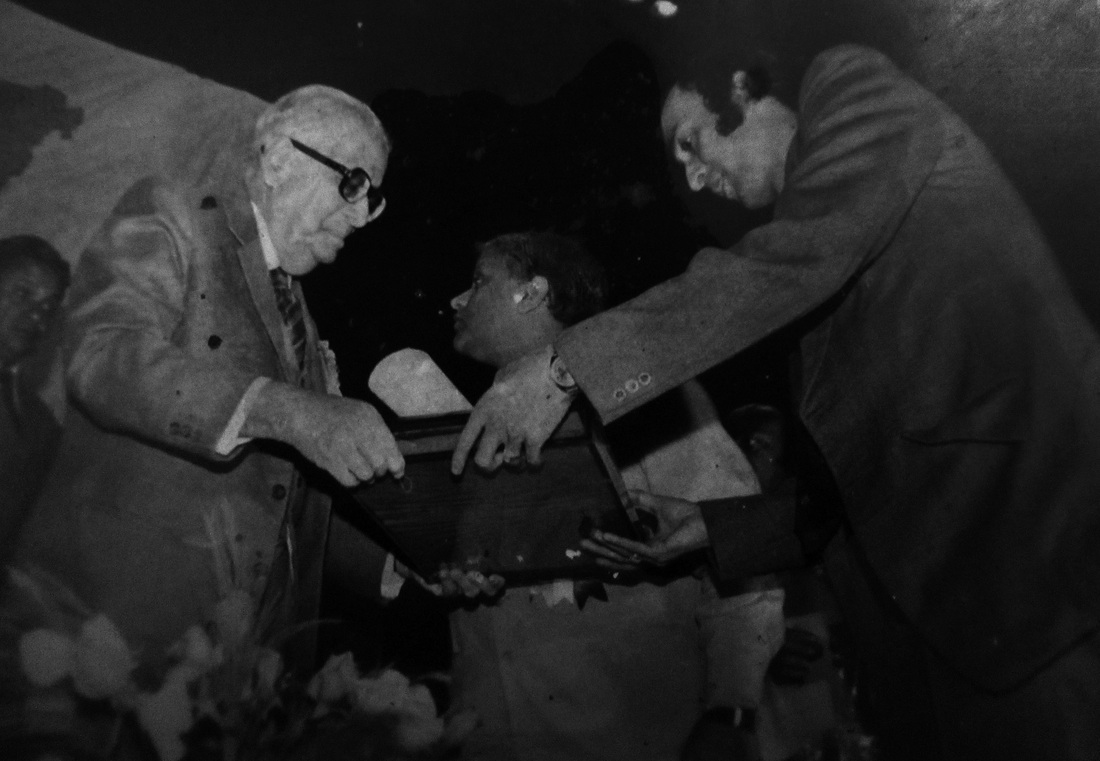
Arup Kumar Dutta receives the Journalist Welfare Foundation, New Delhi Award in 1982 from Vice President Mohammad Hidayatullah

== Awards and recognition ==
- Children's book prizes from Children's Book Trust for Kaziranga Trail (1978); Trouble at Kolongijan (1982); The Blind Witness (1983); Smack (1990)
- Shankar's Award in 1979, conferred to mark The International Year of the Child
- Journalist Welfare Foundation, New Delhi Award in 1982
- NCERT book of the year for Revenge 1987
- Siva Prasad Barooah National Award for Journalism 2004
- Life Time Achievement Honour by Association of Writers and Illustrators for Children, New Delhi, the Indian chapter of the International Board of Books for Young People (IBBY), 2014
- Padma Shri by the Government of India for his contribution to literature and education, 2018
- D.Litt degree (honoris causa) by Dibrugarh University, 2018
- D. Litt degree (honoris causa) by Gauhati University, 2020
