= Gyanendrapati =

Indian poet

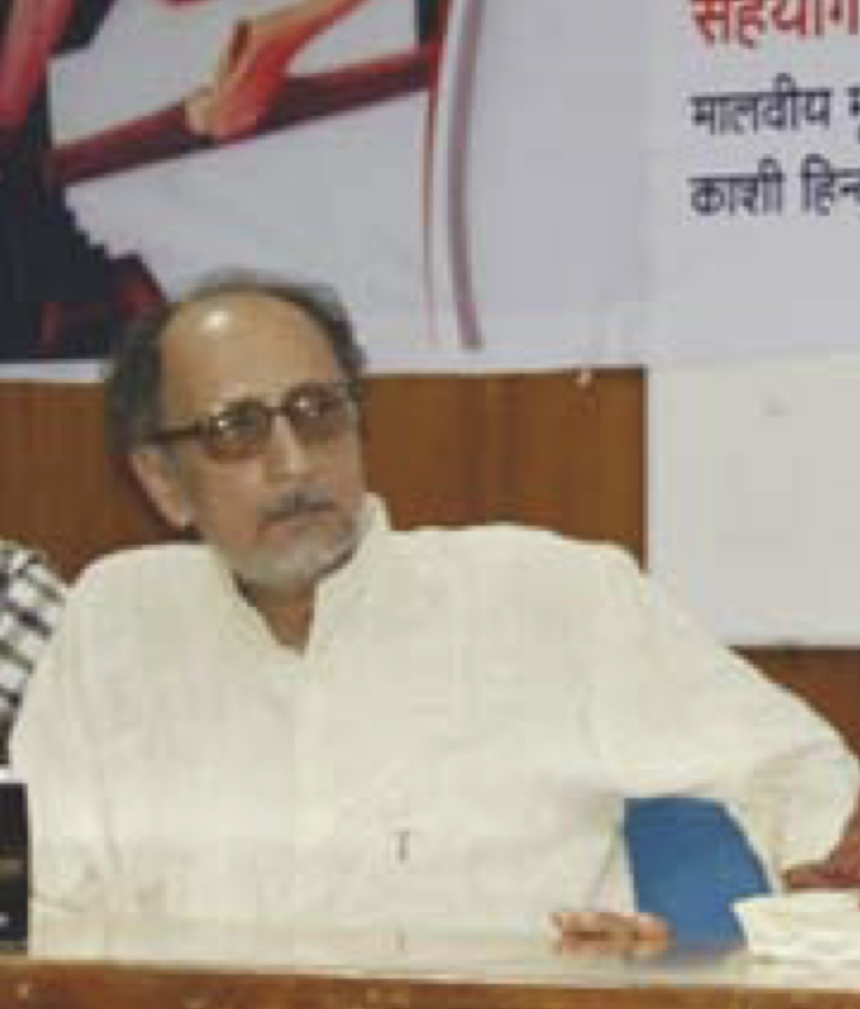
- Gyanendrapati in 2013
- Born: 1 January 1950 (age 76); Pathargama, Godda, Jharkhand, India
- Education: Patna University
- Occupation: Poet
- Writing career
- Subject: Hindi poetry
- Notable work: Sanshayatma
- Notable awards: Sahitya Akademi Award (2006)

Gyanendrapati (Hindi: ज्ञानेंद्रपति; born 1 January 1950) is an Indian Hindi poet, known for his distinctive poetic style rooted in the tradition of Suryakant Tripathi 'Nirala' and his innovative use of language that blends tatsama, tadbhava, and deshaj (indigenous) words. A recipient of the Sahitya Akademi Award in 2006 for his poetry collection Sanshayatma, Gyanendrapati has made significant contributions to contemporary Hindi poetry, exploring themes of social justice, environmental concerns, and human compassion.

His works, such as Gangatat and Ganga-Beeti, reflect a deep engagement with the cultural and ecological significance of the Ganga River, while his poetry often addresses the struggles of marginalised communities.

== Early life and education ==
Gyanendrapati was born on 1 January 1950 in Pathargama village, Godda district, Jharkhand, India, into a farmer’s family.

Gyanendrapati pursued English honours at Patna University, where he was actively involved in student politics and social movements, which later influenced his poetic themes.

His education and formative influences shaped his deep engagement with Hindi literature and poetry, particularly the works of modernist poets like Suryakant Tripathi 'Nirala', whose innovative style inspired Gyanendrapati's own poetic voice.

== Awards ==
Sahitya Akademi Award (2006) for Sanshayatma, recognising his outstanding contribution to Hindi poetry.

== Selected works ==
• Sanshayatma (2006)

== Legacy ==
Gyanendrapati is regarded as a significant figure in contemporary Hindi poetry, contributing to the evolution of the genre through his innovative use of language and engagement with pressing social and environmental issues.
