= Badri Narayan (writer) =

Indian social historian and professor

Badri Narayan Tiwari (born 5 October 1965), is an Indian social historian and cultural anthropologist. He serves as the Vice-Chancellor of the Tata Institute of Social Sciences, Mumbai. and is a former head and director of the G.B. Pant Social Science Institute. He has been recognized as a Fellow of the Maison des Sciences de L'Homme, Paris, and has received the Fulbright Senior Fellowship (2004-05) and the Smuts Fellowship, University of Cambridge (2007). He was awarded the Sahitya Akademi Award (2022) for Hindi for his poetry collection Tumdi Ke Shabd.

== Career ==
Badri Narayan Tiwari earned an MA and a PhD in Modern History from the University of Allahabad and later served as the head of the Govind Ballabh Pant Social Science Institute of the University. According to The Times of India, as a director of the G. B. Pant Social Science Institute in Prayagraj, Tiwari established a Kumbh study centre and an ethnographic museum. He also served as a professor at the Centre for the Study of Discrimination and Exclusion at Jawaharlal Nehru University (JNU).

In July 2025, Prof. Tiwari was appointed as the Vice-Chancellor of the Tata Institute of Social Sciences (TISS), becoming the first to be appointed under the Ministry of Education's new regulations.

== Selected bibliography ==
- Narayan, Badri (15 March 2021). Republic of Hindutva: How the Sangh Is Reshaping Indian Democracy. Penguin Random House India Private Limited. ISBN 978-81-950843-7-1.
- Narayan, Badri (18 April 2014). Kanshiram: Leader of the Dalits. Penguin UK. ISBN 978-93-5118-670-0.
- Narayan, Badri (6 January 2009). Fascinating Hindutva: Saffron Politics and Dalit Mobilisation. SAGE Publications. ISBN 978-81-7829-906-8.
- Narayan, Badri (14 November 2006). Women Heroes and Dalit Assertion in North India: Culture, Identity and Politics. SAGE Publications. ISBN 978-0-7619-3537-7.
- Narayan, Badri (8 January 2018). Khandit Akhyan: Bharatiya Jantantra mein Adrishya Log (in Hindi). Oxford University Press. ISBN 978-0-19-909324-3.
- Narayan, Badri (2001). Documenting Dissent: Contesting Fables, Contested Memories, and Dalit Political Discourse. Indian Institute of Advanced Study. ISBN 978-81-85952-93-2.
- Narayan, Badri (11 May 2011). The Making of the Dalit Public in North India: Uttar Pradesh, 1950–Present. Oxford University Press. ISBN 978-0-19-908845-4.
- नारायण, बद्री (2019). तुमड़ी के शब्द (in Hindi). Rājakamala Prakāśana. ISBN 978-93-88933-83-4.
