= Girija Kumar Mathur =

Indian writer (1919–1994)

Girijakumar Mathur गिरिजाकुमार माथुर
- Born: 22 August 1919; Ashoknagar, Gwalior State, British India
- Died: 10 January 1994 (aged 75); New Delhi, India
- Occupations: Writer, Poet
- Spouse: Shakunt Mathur (m. 1940)
- Children: Pawan Mathur, Amitabh Mathur, Ashok Mathur, Beena Bansal
- Writing career
- Notable works: Nash aur Nirman, Nayi Kavita: Seemae aur Sambhavnae
- Notable awards: Sahitya Akademi Award

Girija Kumar Mathur (Hindi: गिरिजाकुमार माथुर) (22 August 1919 – 10 January 1994) was a notable Indian writer of the Hindi language. He is noted for his translation of the popular English song "We Shall Overcome" into Hindi (हम होगें कामयाब). His father, Devicharan Mathur, was a teacher in a local school and greatly admired music as well as literature. His mother's name was Laxmidevi. Girijakumar Mathur is considered one of the most important writers in Hindi due to his efforts to modernise Hindi literature and promote it through many of his works.

== Early life ==
Girijakumar Mathur was born in Ashoknagar which was tehsil of Guna before 2003 Madhya Pradesh, on 22 August 1919. He was homeschooled by his father in History, Geography and English. After obtaining his primary education in Jhansi, he was awarded a degree of M.A (English) and L.L.B from Lucknow University. After practicing law for a few years, he started working in All India Radio and later Doordarshan.

== Professional and musical career ==
On obtaining his law degree, Mathur initially worked as a lawyer, but subsequently joined the Delhi office of All India Radio. After a few years there, he moved on to join the then only television broadcasting organization of India, Doordarshan.

Mathur published his first collection of poems, Manjir in 1941.

It was during his service in Doordarshan that mathur translated the popular gospel and civil rights movement song "We shall overcome" into Hindi as "Ham Honge Kaamyab" (हम होंगे कामयाब). It was sung by a female singer of the Doordarshan orchestra and the music was arranged by Satish Bhatia using Indian musical instruments. This version of the song was subsequently released by TVS Saregama. This Hindi rendition was released in 1970 as a song of social upliftment and was often broadcast by Doordarshan in the 1970s and 1980s. Doordarshan at that time was the only television station of India, and this song was especially played on days of national significance.

Mathur continued to work in Doordarshan, retiring in 1978 as the deputy director general.

== Works ==
Girijakumar Mathur started his career in literature in 1934 in the Braj language.Greatly influenced by authors such as Makhanlal Chaturvedi and Balkrishna Sharma 'Navin', he published his first anthology, 'Manjir' in 1941. He was an important contributor to Hindi literature and used his works to spread moral messages through society. His notable works include:

- Nash aur Nirman
- Dhup ke Dhan
- Sheilapankh Chamkile
- Bhitri Nadi Ki Yatra (Anthology)
- Janm Kaid (Play)
- Nayi Kavita:Seemae aur Sambhavnae

Girijakumar Mathur was one of the seven eminent Hindi poets included in Tar Saptak, an anthology edited and published by Agyeya in 1943. Apart from poems, he wrote many plays, songs as well as essays. In 1991, he was awarded the Sahitya Akademi Award for his anthology, "Main Vakt ke Hun Samne" as well as the Vyas Samman in the same year. He is noted for his translation of the popular English song "We Shall Overcome" into Hindi.

Mathur described his life's journey in his autobiography Mujhe aur abhi kehna hai (मुझे और अभी कहना है) (I still have to say something).

== Death ==
Girijakumar Mathur died on 10 January 1994, aged 75 in New Delhi.
