= Nand Kishore Acharya =

Indian poet

- Born: 31 August 1945 (age 80); Bikaner, Rajasthan, British Raj
- Occupations: Playwright, poet, critic
- Writing career
- Notable work: Chheelate Hue Apane Ko
- Notable awards: Sahitya Akademi Award (2019); Sangeet Natak Akademi Award; Bihari Puraskar by the KK Birla Foundation

Nand Kishore Acharya (born 31 August 1945) is an Indian playwright, poet, and critic who was born in Bikaner, Rajasthan. He is a professor emeritus at the International Institute of Information Technology, Hyderabad, where he taught Political Economy and Human Rights.

== Awards ==
- Sahitya Academy Award 2019.
- Rajasthan Sahitya Akademi's highest honour Mira Award.

== Bibliography ==
=== Poetry ===
- Jal Hai Jhan (1980)
- Wah Ek Samudra Tha (1982)
- Shabda Bhule Hue (1987)
- Aati Hai Jaise Mrityu (1990)
- Kavita Mein Nahin Hai Jo (1995)
- Anya Hote Hue (2008)

=== Plays ===
- Dehaantar (including Kimidam Yaksham 1987)
- Paagalghar (including Joote 1988)
- Gulam Badshah (including Hastinapur 1992)
- Kisi aur ka sapna

=== Criticisms ===
- Ajneya Ki Kaavya Titirsha (1970)
- Rachna Ka Sacch (1986)
- Sarjak Ka Man (1987)
- Anubhava Ka Bhaval (1994)
- Sahitya Ka Svabhava (2001)
- Sarjak Ka Man

=== Others ===
- Sanskriti Ka Vyakarana (1988)
- Aadhunik Vichar Aur Shiksha (1989)
- Parampara Aur Parivartan (1991)
- Sabhyata Ka Vikalpa
- The Cultural Polity of the Hindus
- Polity in Shukranitisaar

=== Translation ===
- Sunate Hue Baarish (1983) (Riokaan)
- Nav Manavaad (1998) (M.N. Roy)
- Vignana Aur Darshan (1999) (M.N. Roy)
