= Ramesh Kuntal Megh =

Indian litterateur

- रमेश कुंतल मेघ
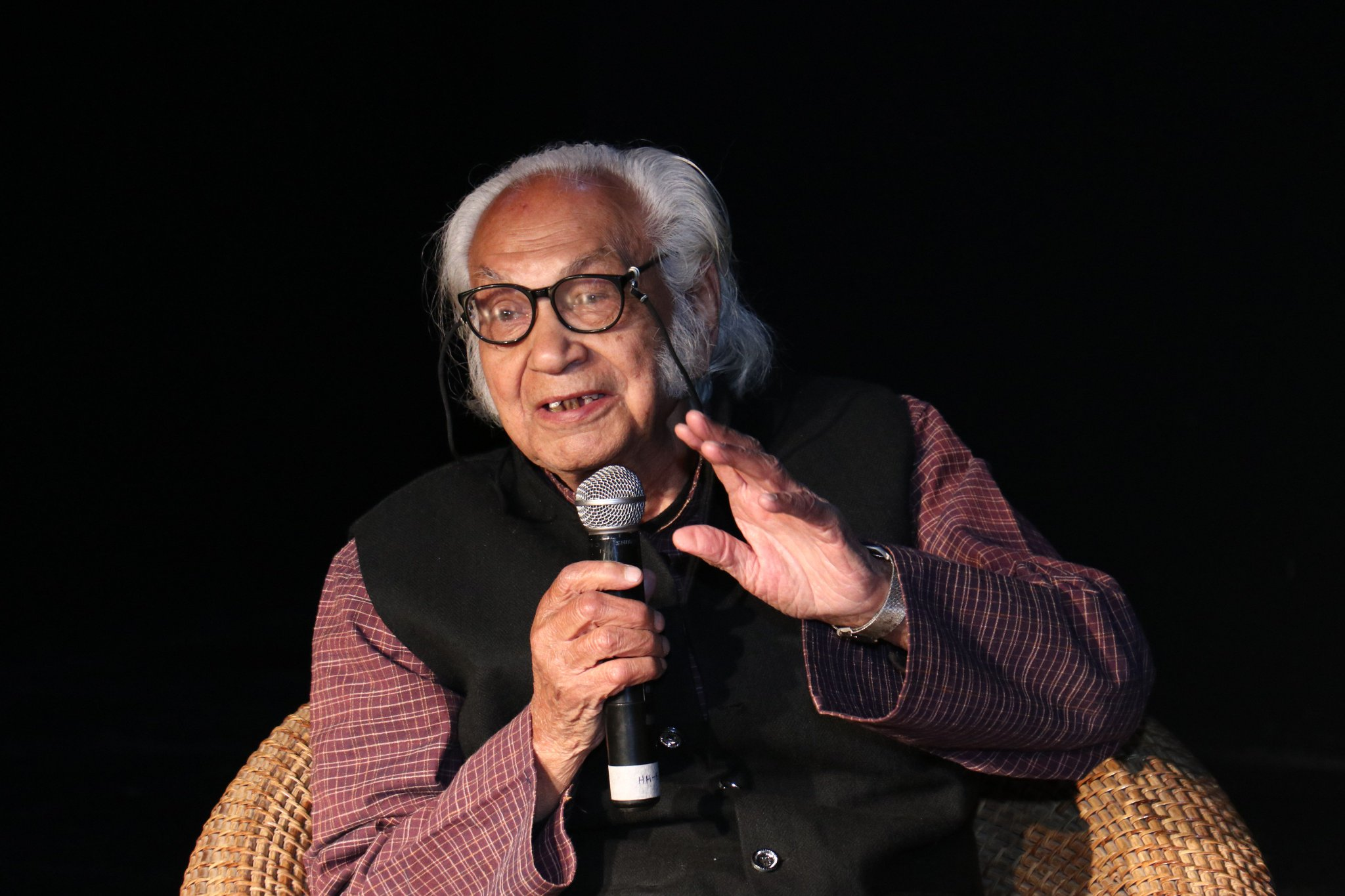
- Megh in 2018
- Born: Ramesh Prasad Misra; 1 June 1931; Kanpur, Uttar Pradesh, India
- Died: 1 September 2023 (aged 92); Chandigarh, India
- Education: Banaras Hindu University
- Occupations: Scholar; writer; literary critic
- Writing career
- Subject: Hindi literature
- Notable awards: Sahitya Akademi Award (2017)

Ramesh Kuntal Megh (Hindi: रमेश कुंतल मेघ; 1 June 1931 – 1 September 2023) was an Indian Hindi scholar, writer, and literary critic, known for his contributions to Hindi literature, particularly in the field of progressive criticism. He received the Sahitya Akademi Award in 2017 for his literary criticism work Vishwa Mithak Sarit Sagar (World Myth Sarit Sagar), a significant exploration of interdisciplinary approaches to mythology and aesthetics in literature.

== Early life and education ==
Ramesh Kuntal Megh was born Ramesh Prasad Misra on 1 June 1930 in Kanpur, India. He developed an early interest in Hindi literature and pursued advanced studies in the field, establishing himself as a dedicated scholar of Hindi language and aesthetics.

Megh earned a BSc in physics, Mathematics, and Chemistry from Allahabad University, Prayagraj, before obtaining a PhD in literature from Banaras Hindu University, Varanasi. He was a disciple of the scholar Acharya Hazari Prasad Dwivedi.

== Career ==
Megh began his career under the mentorship of the Hindi novelist and literary historian Hazari Prasad Dwivedi, who brought Megh to the Department of Hindi at Panjab University, Chandigarh.

There, Megh contributed to shaping the curriculum and mentoring students in Hindi literature. He later served at the Regional Centre for Education, Jalandhar, and subsequently at Guru Nanak Dev University, Amritsar.

As a critic, Megh was noted for expanding the scope of progressive criticism in Hindi literature, emphasising interdisciplinary approaches that integrated aesthetics and cultural analysis. His work Vishwa Mithak Sarit Sagar, published in 2016, is considered a seminal contribution to literary criticism, exploring global mythological narratives and their relevance to Hindi literature. The work earned him the Sahitya Akademi Award in 2017, recognising his contribution to the field.

Megh was also known for his mastery of Saundrabodh (aesthetics), as noted by poet Chander Trikha, who described him as a "master of aesthetics" who devoted his life to research and writing. His scholarly influence extended beyond academia, inspiring students and writers in Chandigarh and Punjab to engage deeply with Hindi literature.

== Personal life ==
Megh was married and had a daughter, Shiprali Megh, who survived him. Megh spent his later years in Chandigarh, where he remained active in literary circles until his health declined due to Alzheimer's dementia, which he battled for three years before his passing.

== Awards ==
Sahitya Akademi Award (2017) for Vishwa Mithak Sarit Sagar (Literary Criticism, Hindi)

== Selected works ==
- Samudra Se Uthata Pahad (2006)
- Vishwa Mithak Sarit Sagar (2016) – Literary criticism exploring global mythological narratives.

== Death ==
Megh died on 1 September 2023 at the age of 92 due to a heart attack in Sector 16, Chandigarh. As per his wishes, his body was donated to the Postgraduate Institute of Medical Education and Research (PGI) in Chandigarh for medical research.

His death prompted tributes from writers and scholars across Chandigarh and Punjab, with figures such as Punjabi poet Gurbhajan Gill praising his dedication and contributions to literary education.
