= Agyeya =

Indian poet and writer (1911-1987)

- Born: Sachchidananda Hirananda Vatsyayan; 7 March 1911; Kasia, United Provinces of Agra and Oudh, British India
- Died: 4 April 1987 (aged 76); New Delhi, India
- Education: Madras Christian College (1925–1927; Intermediate); Forman Christian College (1927–1929; B.Sc.)
- Occupations: Writer, poet, novelist, literary critic, journalist, translator and revolutionary
- Spouses: Santosh Malik (m. 1940; div. 1945) Kapila Vatsyayan (m. 1956; div. 1969)
- Relatives: Hiranand Sastri (father)
- Writing career
- Pen name: Agyeya
- Notable works: Shekhar: Ek Jivani; Trishanku; Angan Ke Par Dwar; Tar Saptak
- Notable awards: Sahitya Akademi Award (1964); Jnanpith Award (1978); Golden Wreath Award (1983)
- Movement: Nayi Kavita (New Poetry)

Signature
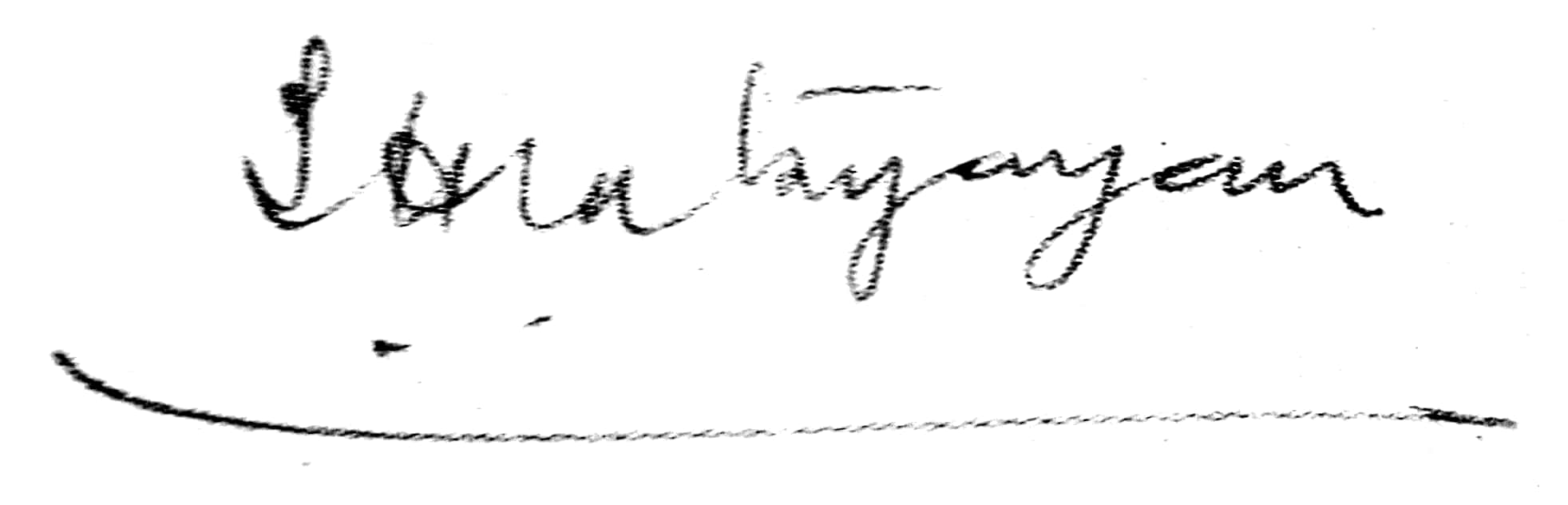

Sachchidananda Hirananda Vatsyayan (7 March 1911 – 4 April 1987), popularly known by his pen name Agyeya (also transliterated Ajneya, meaning 'the unknowable'), was an Indian poet, novelist, literary critic, journalist, translator and revolutionary. He pioneered modern trends in Hindi poetry, as well as in fiction, criticism and journalism. He is regarded as the pioneer of the Prayogavaad (experimentalism) movement in modern Hindi literature.

Son of a renowned archaeologist Hiranand Sastri, Agyeya was born in Kasia, a small town near Kushinagar in Uttar Pradesh. He took active part in the Indian freedom struggle and spent several years in prison for his revolutionary activities against British colonial rule.

He edited the Saptak series which gave rise to a new trends in Hindi poetry, known as Nayi Kavita. He edited several literary journals, and launched his own Hindi language weekly Dinaman, which set new standard and trends in Hindi journalism. Agyeya translated some of his own works, as well as works of some other Indian authors to English. He also translated some books of world literature into Hindi.

Agyeya was awarded the Sahitya Akademi Award (1964), Jnanpith Award (1978) and the internationally reputed Golden Wreath Award for poetry.

== Early life and education ==
Agyeya was born as Sachchidananda Vatsyayan in Punjabi Brahmin family on 7 March 1911 in an archaeological camp near Kasia, Kushinagar district of Uttar Pradesh, where his father, Hiranand Sastri, an archaeologist, was positioned for an excavation. His mother was Vyantidevi (d. 1924) who was not much educated. Hiranand Sastri and Vyantidevi had 10 children, of whom Agyeya was the fourth. Agyeya spent his early childhood in Lucknow (1911–1915). Due to his father's professional appointment at various places, he had to shift to various places including Srinagar and Jammu (1915–1919), Patna (1920), Nalanda (1921) and the Ootacamund and Kotagiri (1921–1925). Due to this peripatetic lifestyle, Agyeya came into contact with different Indian languages and cultures. His father, a scholar in Sanskrit, encouraged him to study Hindi and taught him some basic English. He was taught Sanskrit and Persian by Pandit and Maulavi in Jammu.

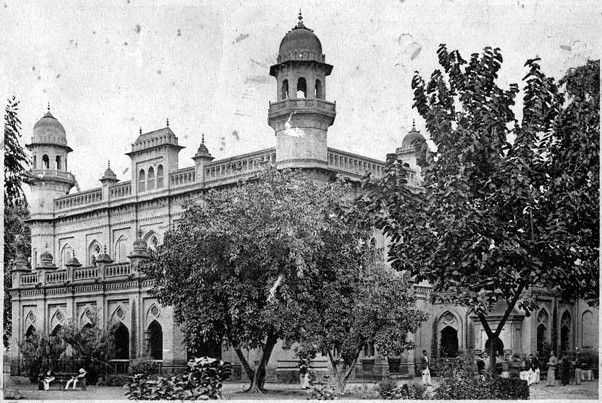
Forman Christian College in 1930; where Agyeya studied B.Sc

After passing his matriculation in 1925 from the University of Punjab, Agyeya moved to Madras, joined the Madras Christian College, and did Intermediate in Science in 1927, studying mathematics, physics and chemistry. In the same year, he joined the Forman Christian College in Lahore, where he studied Mathematics, Physics, Chemistry and English, and received a Bachelor of Science in 1929, standing first in a class. Thereafter he enrolled for an M.A. in English, but dropped out, and joined the Hindustan Socialist Republican Army (HSRA), a revolutionary organisation, with a view to fight for Indian independence movement, and participated in rebellious activities against the British colonial government. In November 1930, he was arrested on account of his involvement in the attempt to help Bhagat Singh, a socialist revolutionary and leader of HSRA, to escape from jail in 1929. He was then sentenced on charge of sedition against British rule in India. He spent the next four years in jail in Lahore, Delhi and Amritsar. During these prison days, he started writing short stories, poems and the first draft of his novel Shekhar: Ek Jivani.

He was associated with the Progressive Writers Association (PWA) and, in 1942, he organised the All India Anti-Fascist Convention. During World War II in 1942, he joined the Indian army and was sent to the Kohima Front as a combatant officer. He left the army in 1946. He stayed at Meerut (Uttar Pradesh) for sometime and remained active in local literary groups. During this period, he published several translations into English of other writers, and a collection of his own poems, Prison Days and Other Poems.

Agyeya married Santosh Malik in 1940. Their marriage ended in divorce in 1945. He married Kapila Vatsyayan (née Malik) on 7 July 1956. They separated in 1969. He died on 4 April 1987, aged 76, in New Delhi. He was cremated at Nigambodh Ghat.

== Career ==
After his release from jail in 1934, Agyeya worked as a journalist in Calcutta, and from 1939 for All India Radio.

Agyeya edited Sainik from Agra (1936–1937), Vishal Bharat from Calcutta (1937–1939), Prateek (1947) and Naya Prateek (1973) respectively from Allahabad and New Delhi. In English. he edited Vak (1951). He served as an editor of Jayprakash Narayan's Everyman's Weekly (1973–1974) and editor-in-chief of Hindi daily Navbharat Times (1977–1980) of the Times of India Group.

He travelled to Japan in 1957–58, where he learned about Zen Buddhism which influenced him and his writing style. In 1961, he joined the University of California, Berkeley as a visiting lecturer in Indian Literature and Civilization, and remained there until June 1964.

In 1965, he returned to India and became Founder Editor of the newsweekly Dinaman of the Times of India Group. When the members of the Hungry generation or Bhookhi Peerhi movement were arrested and prosecuted for their anti-establishment writings, Agyeya through Dinmaan relentlessly supported the young literary group of Culcutta till they were exonerated. His dispatches on Bihar's famous famine are considered milestones in pro-people reporting.

He remained in India till 1968, before embarking on a trip to Europe. In 1969 he returned to Berkeley as Regents Professor, and continued there until June 1970. In 1976, he had an 8-month stint at Heidelberg University, as a visiting professor. Later he joined University of Jodhpur, Rajasthan as Professor and Head of the Department of Comparative Literature.

== Works ==
During the four years in prison, Agyeya started writing short stories and published them in Hans, edited by Premchand. He also started writing the first draft of his autobiographical novel Shekhar: Ek Jivani, followed by its second and third draft. His first collection of poems, Bhagnadutta, appeared in 1933. After his release from the jail, he published his first short story collection, Vipathga, in 1937, and in 1941, he published the first volume of Shekhar: Ek Jivani, followed by the second volume in 1944. Its third volume, though announced, was never published.

In 1943, he edited and published Tar Saptak, a collection of poems by seven young writers, whose poems were not published before. Considered the first anthology of modern Hindi poetry and a milestone in the history of Hindi literature, Tar Saptak gave rise to the Prayogvad (Experimentalism) in Hindi poetry, and established a new trends Hindi poetry, known as Nayi Kavita (New Poetry).

Poetry collections

- Bhagndoot (1933)
- Chinta (1942)
- Ityalam (1946)
- Hari ghaas par kshan-bhar (1949)
- Baawra aheri (1954)
- Indradhanu raunde hue ye (1957)
- Ari o karuna prabhamaya (1959)
- Angan Ke Par Dwar (1961)
- Poorva (1965)
- Sunahale Shaivaal (1965)
- Kitni naavon mein kitni baar (1967)
- Kyonki main usei jaanta hoon (1969)
- Saagar-mudra (1970)
- Pahle main sannata bunta hoon (1973)
- Mahavriksha ke neeche (1977)
- Nadi ki baank par chhaya (1982)
- Sadanira-1 (1986)
- Sadanira-2 (1986)
- Aisa koi ghar aapne dekha hai (1986)
- Maruthal (1995)
- Sarjana ke kshan (Selection)
- Thaur thikaane (Handwritten, circulated xeroxed)
- Karaawas ke din (Trans. from English by Uday Shankar Shrivastava)
- Kavishri (Ed. Shiyaram Sharan Gupt)
- Aaj ke lokpriy kavi (Ed. Vidya Niwas Mishra)
- Kaavya-stabak (Ed by Vidya Niwas Mishra & Ramesh Chandra Shah)
- Sannate ka chhand (Ed by Ashok Vajpeyi)
- Ajneya: Sanklit kavitayen (Ed by Namvar Singh)

Novels:

- Shekhar: Ek Jeevani I (1941)
- Shekhar: Ek Jeevani II (1944)
- Shekhar: Ek Jeevni III (Unpublished)
- Nadi ke dweep (1952)
- Apne-apne ajnabi (1961)
- Barahkhambha (co-writer, 1987)
- Chhaya mekhal (Incomplete, 2000)
- Beenu bhagat (Incomplete, 2000)

Stories anthologies:

- Vipathga (1937)
- Parmpara (1944)
- Kothri ki baat (1945)
- Sharnaarthi (1948)
- Jaydol (1951)
- Amarvallari tatha anya kahaniyan (1954)
- Kadiayan tatha anya kahaniyan (1957)
- Acchute phool tatha anya kahaniyan (1960)
- Ye tere pratiroop (1961)
- Jigyasa tatha anya kahaniyan (1965)
- Meri priy kahaniyan (Selection, 2004)
- Chhorra hua rasta (Sampoorn kahanitan-1, 1975)
- Lautti pagdandiyan (Sampoorn kahaniyan-2, 1975)
- Sampoorn Kahaniyan (2005)
- Adam Ki diary (Ed by Nand Kishore Acharya, 2002)

Play:

- Uttar Priyadarshi

Travelogue:

- Are Yayavar Rahega Yaad (1953)
- Kirnon ki khoj mein (Selection, 1955)
- Ek Boond Sahsa Uchhli (1960)

Criticism:

- Trishanku
- Hindi sahitya: Ek adhunik paridrishya
- Atmanepad
- Aatmparak
- Aalwaal
- Likhi kagad kore
- Jog likhi
- Adyatan
- Samvatsar
- Smriti ke paridrishya
- Srot aur setu
- Vyakti aur vyavastha
- Yug-sandhiyon par
- Dhaar aur kinaare
- Bhartiya kala drishti
- Smritichhanda
- Kendra aur paridhi
- Srijan: kyon air kaise
- Kavi-Nikash
- Kavi-drishti (Prefaces)
- Tadbhav (Selection by Ashok Vajpeyi)
- Lekhak ka Dayittva (Ed by Nand Kishore Acharya)
- Khule Mein Khada Ped (Ed by Nand Kishore Acharya)

Light Essyas:

- Sab rang
- Sab rang aur kuchh raag
- Kahan hai dwaraka
- Chhaya ka jangal

Diary:

- Bhavanti
- Antara
- Shaswati
- Shesha
- Kaviman (Ed by Ila Dalmia Koirala)

Memoirs:

- Smriti-lekha
- Smriti ke galiyaron se
- Main kyun likhta hoon

Edited:

- Tar Saptak
- Doosra Saptak
- Teesra Saptak
- Chautha Saptak
- Pushkarini
- Naye ekanki
- Nehru abhinandan granth (co-editor)
- Roopambara (Sumitrnandan Pant abhinandan granth)
- Homvati smarak granth
- Sarjan aur sampreshan
- Sahitya ka parivesh
- Sahity aur samaj parivartan
- Samajik yatharth aur katha-bhasha
- Samkaleen kavita mein chhand
- Bhavishya aur sahitya
- Indian Poetic Tradition (With Vidya Niwas Mishra and Leonard Nathan)

Introducing:

- Naye Sahitya Srishta-1 Raghuveer Sahay: Seedihiyon par dhoop mein
- Naye Sahitya Srishta-2 Sarveshawar Dayal Saxena: Kaath ki ghantiyan
- Naye Sahitya Srishta-3 Ajit Kumar: Ankit hone do
- Naye Sahitya Srishta-4 Shanti Mehrotra

Conversations:

- Aparoksh, Ramesh Chandra Shah & others
- Rachna: Kyon aur kinke beech, Sharad Kumar, Geeti Sen & Others
- Agyeya Apne bare mein (AIR Archives), Raghuveer Sahay & Gopal Das
- Kavi Nayak Ajneya, Ila Dalmia & Neelima Mathur

In English:

- Prison days and other poems (Poetry)
- A sense of time (Essays)

Selection (general): Sanchayita (Ed Nand Kishore Acharya)

Translations:

- Shrikant (Sharat Chandra, from Bengali, 1944)
- Gora (Rabindranath Thakur, from Bengali)
- Raja (Rabindranath Thakur, from Bengali)
- Vivekanand (With Raghuvir Sahay, from Bengali)
- The resignation (Jainendra Kumar, into English)
- The seventh horse of the sun (Dharmveer Bharti, into English)
- The Silent waters (Poems of Sarveshwar Dayal Saxena, in 'Thought')
- Vazir ka Feela (Ivo Andric, from English)
- Mahayatra (Pär Lagerkvist's trilogy, from English)

Self-translated works:

- Islands in the stream (Nadi ke dweep, into English)
- To each his stranger (Apne apne ajnabi, into English)
- The unmastered lute and other poems (Asadhya Veena and other poems into English, Ed by Pritish Nandy)
- The revolving rock and other poems (Chakrant Shila and other poems into English, Ed Pritish Nandy)
- First Person, Second Person (Poems, into English with Leonard Nathan)
- Signs and silences (Poems, into English with Leonard Nathan)
- Nilambari (Poems, into English)
- Truculent clay (Bhavanti, into English with Manas Mukul Das)
- Preparing the ground (Antara, into English with Manas Mukul Das)

Translations in other languages: (Indian languages list too long)

- German: Sekh Ktoratien (By Lothar Lutze)
- : Stand-orte (By Lothar Lutze)
- Swedish : Den arket (By orten Al Bud)
- Servo-Croatian: Catoetien
- : prvo liche drugo liche
- :Vsak ima svoyega tuicha (By Tregoslav Andrich)

Films on Ajneya:

- Sarswat Van Ka Bavra Aheri, Producer Durgavati Singh, Doordarshan, New Delhi
- Sannate ka Chhand, Dir. Pramod & Neelima Mathur, Vatsal Nidhi, New Delhi
- Deep Akela, Dir. Pramod Mathur, MGAHVV, Wardha
- Kavi Bharti, Bharat Bhawan, Bhopal

== Reception ==
Agyeya was awarded the Sahitya Akademi Award in 1964 for his collection of poems Angan Ke Par Dwar, and the Jnanpith Award in 1978 for Kitni Naavon Mein Kitni Baar. He was also awarded the Bharatbharati Award and the Golden Wreath Award for poetry in 1983.

Agyeya is considered to be one of the most influential Hindi writers of the 20th century and is seen as the founder of ādhuniktā (modernism) in Hindi literature. He is considered 'the most westernised' among the Hindi writers between the 1940s and the 1960s. He was often criticised for his excessive use of intellectualism and individualism in his writings.

The scholar Sushil Kumar Phull calls Agyeya an 'intellectual giant' and 'pundit of language' (master of language), and compares him with English poet Robert Browning for his obscure and condense language which he used in his poetry.

== Dramatic productions ==
His verse play Uttar Priyadarshi, about the redemption of King Ashoka was first staged in 1966 at Triveni open-air theatre in Delhi in presence of the writer. Later it was adapted to Manipuri, by theatre director, Ratan Thiyam in 1996, and since been performed by his group, in various parts of the world.
